= List of songs recorded by the Jackson 5 =

This article presents the list of songs recorded by the Jackson 5 and The Jacksons.

== History ==
The Jackson 5 is an American music group, which began forming around 1963-1965 by the Jackson family brothers Jackie, Jermaine, Marlon, Michael and Tito. In 1967, the quintet's first singles were recorded in Chicago and released by Steeltown Records, which was located in their hometown of Gary, Indiana. The songs released by Steeltown in 1968 included "Big Boy" (sung by Michael Jackson), "You've Changed", and "We Don't Have To Be Over 21 (to Fall in Love)". Although Steeltown is best known in Gary and northwest Indiana for giving the Jackson 5 their actual start in the music industry by releasing their first records, music journalist Nelson George claimed that Michael Jackson and the Jackson 5's "real" recording history did not begin until their move to Motown Records in 1968. The then Detroit-based company, led by Berry Gordy, housed established recording artists such as Stevie Wonder, Marvin Gaye and Diana Ross, as well as a producing-writing team known as "The Corporation". In 1969 and 1970, the Jackson 5 hit singles such as "I Want You Back", "ABC", and "The Love You Save" (1970), were written by the Motown team, and aided the five brothers in becoming the first boys band and black teen idols.

The success of the Jackson 5 continued throughout the early 1970s, as "Jackson mania" emerged due to the fan frenzy caused by American teens. A notable hit single for the group at this time was "Dancing Machine", a dance song produced by Hal Davis, which also contained elements of the emerging disco sound. Despite their overall success at Motown, four of the Jackson brothers decided to part with the company in 1976 in order to have the entire control of their music, and moved to Epic Records. The group left behind brother Jermaine and the "5" at the end of their name, as they established themselves as "The Jacksons" with the addition of younger sibling Randy. At Epic, the five entered into a two-album collaboration with songwriters Kenny Gamble and Leon Huff, who produced "Enjoy Yourself", the biggest success from the partnership.

As Michael Jackson achieved solo success with the studio albums Off the Wall (1979) and Thriller (1982), his musical artistry matured on collaborations with his brothers. The Jacksons' "This Place Hotel"—from the siblings' Triumph (1980)—contained the singer's first use of sound effects, horror film motifs and vocal trickery to convey a sense of danger to listeners (effects that will be used to their full potential to "Thriller" song). The singing efforts of Michael and his brothers led to the group being inducted into the Rock and Roll Hall of Fame in 1997 and the Vocal Group Hall of Fame in 1999. Two of the band's recordings ("ABC" and "I Want You Back") are among the Rock and Roll Hall of Fame's "500 Songs that Shaped Rock and Roll", with the latter track also included in the Grammy Hall of Fame.

== Featured songs ==
=== 0–9 ===
| Title | Originating album | Writer(s) | Notes |
| "2-4-6-8" | ABC | Gloria Jones; Pam Sawyer | — |
| "16 Candles" | Maybe Tomorrow | The Corporation | — |
| "2300 Jackson Street" | 2300 Jackson Street | Aaron Hall; Gene Griffin; Jackie Jackson; Jermaine Jackson; Randy Jackson; Tito Jackson | The song featured backing vocals by "the Jackson Family and Children", which included Michael, Janet, Rebbie and 3T (Tito's children). |
=== A ===
| Title | Originating album | Writer(s) | Notes |
| "A Change Is Gonna Come" | | Sam Cooke | Steeltown track; Two versions of this song were released; the original 1960s recording and an over-dubbed extended remix |
| "A Fool for You" | Soulsation! | Ray Charles | — |
| "ABC" | ABC | The Corporation | Originally titled "1-2-3" and "ABCD"; demo versions of these are known to exist |
| "After You Leave Girl" | Come and Get It: The Rare Pearls | Bobby Taylor | |
| "Ain't Nothing Like the Real Thing" | Lookin' Through the Windows | Ashford & Simpson | — |
| "Ain't That Peculiar" | In Japan! | Marvin Tarplin; Ronald White; Smokey Robinson | Live |
| "All I Do Is Think of You" | Moving Violation | Edward Holland, Jr. Michael Lovesmith | — |
| "All Night Dancin'" | Destiny | Michael Jackson; Randy Jackson | |
| "Alright With Me" | 2300 Jackson Street | Attala Zane Giles; Jackie Jackson; Jermaine Jackson; Tito Jackson | Michael Jackson was not involved with the recording of this song |
| "Art of Madness" | 2300 Jackson Street | Bruce Sudano; Jermaine Jackson; Michael Omartian | Michael Jackson was not involved with the recording of this song |
| "Ask the Lonely" | Soulsation! | Holland-Dozier-Holland; William "Mickey" Stevenson | A remixed version of this song was released on the 1983 compilation album Motown Superstars Sing Motown Superstars, prior to the inclusion of the original 1970 recording being featured on Soulsation! in 1995 |
=== B ===
| Title | Originating album | Writer(s) | Notes |
| "Baby, You Don't Have to Go" | | Jimmy Reed | Steeltown track; An extended four-minute version of this song was included on the 2005 download compilation Soul Masters |
| "Be Not Always" | Victory | Marlon Jackson; Michael Jackson | — |
| "Big Boy" | | Ed Silver | Steeltown track; The Jackson 5's first ever single |
| "Blame It on the Boogie" | Destiny | Mick Jackson | — |
| "Bless His Soul" | Destiny | Jackie Jackson; Marlon Jackson; Michael Jackson; Randy Jackson; Tito Jackson | — |
| "Blues Away" | The Jacksons | Michael Jackson | — |
| "Body" | Victory | Marlon Jackson | — |
| "Body Language (Do the Love Dance)" | Moving Violation | Don Fletcher; Hal Davis | — |
| "Born to Love You" | Diana Ross Presents The Jackson 5 | Ivy Jo Hunter; William "Mickey" Stevenson | — |
| "Boys and Girls, We Are The Jackson Five" | | Sam Wibourn | Steeltown track; Also known as "Jam Session (Part 2)" |
| "Brand New Thing" | Live at the Forum | Jackie Jackson; Marlon Jackson; Michael Jackson; Randy Jackson; Tito Jackson | Live |
| "Breezy" | Moving Violation | Jerry Marcellino; Mel Larson | — |
| "Bridge over Troubled Water" | Third Album | Paul Simon | — |
| "Buttercup" | I Want You Back! Unreleased Masters | Stevie Wonder | Cover version of Stevie Wonder's track |
=== C ===
| Title | Originating album | Writer(s) | Notes |
| "Call of the Wild" | Moving Violation | Jerry Marcellino; Mel Larson | — |
| "Can I See You in the Morning" | Third Album | Deke Richards | — |
| "Can You Feel It" | Triumph | Jackie Jackson; Michael Jackson | |
| "Can You Remember" | Diana Ross Presents The Jackson 5 | Thom Bell; William Hart | — |
| "Can't Get Ready for Losing You" | Soulsation! | Richard Hutch; Willie Hutch | — |
| "Chained" | Diana Ross Presents The Jackson 5 | Frank Wilson | — |
| "Children of the Light" | Lookin' Through the Windows | Michael Randall | — |
| "Christmas Won't Be the Same This Year" | The Jackson 5 Christmas Album | Laverne Ware; Pam Sawyer | — |
| "Come And Get It (Love's On The Fire)" | Come and Get It: The Rare Pearls | Deke Richards Freddie Perren Alphonzo Mizell | |
| "(Come 'Round Here) I'm the One You Need" | ABC | Holland–Dozier–Holland | — |
| "Coming Home" | Soulsation! | The Corporation | Demo version also known to exist |
| "Corner of the Sky" | Skywriter | Stephen Schwartz | — |
| "Cupid" | Come and Get It: The Rare Pearls | Clay Drayton Tamy Smith | |
=== D ===
| Title | Originating album | Writer(s) | Notes |
| "Dancing Machine" | G.I.T.: Get It Together | Dean Parks; Don Fletcher; Hal Davis | — |
| "Darling Dear" | Third Album | George Gordy; Rosemary Gordy | — |
| "Destiny" | Destiny | Jackie Jackson; Marlon Jackson; Michael Jackson; Randy Jackson; Tito Jackson | — |
| "Different Kind of Lady" | Goin' Places | Jackie Jackson; Marlon Jackson; Michael Jackson; Randy Jackson; Tito Jackson | Different version featured on the Goin' Places picture disc, with opening horns removed |
| "Do What You Wanna" | Goin' Places | Jackie Jackson; Marlon Jackson; Michael Jackson; Randy Jackson; Tito Jackson | — |
| "Doctor My Eyes" | Lookin' Through the Windows | Jackson Browne | — |
| "Don't Know Why I Love You" | ABC | Don Hunter; Lula Hardaway; Paul Riser; Stevie Wonder | — |
| "Don't Let Your Baby Catch You" | Lookin' Through the Windows | The Corporation | — |
| "Don't Say Goodbye Again" | G.I.T.: Get It Together | Laverne Ware; Pam Sawyer | — |
| "Don't Want to See You Tomorrow" | Lookin' Through the Windows | Hal Davis; Joyce Chambers; Stephen Bowden; Terri McFadden | — |
| "Dreamer" | The Jacksons | Gamble and Huff | — |
=== E ===
| Title | Originating album | Writer(s) | Notes |
| "E-Ne-Me-Ne-Mi-Ne-Moe (The Choice is Yours to Pull)" | Lookin' Through the Windows | David Jones; John Bristol; Wade Brown | — |
| "Enjoy Yourself" | The Jacksons | Gamble and Huff | Alternative version featured on the 2004 compilations The Essential Jacksons and The Very Best of The Jacksons |
| "Even Though You're Gone" | Goin' Places | Gamble and Huff | — |
| "Everybody" | Triumph | Michael Jackson; Mike McKinney; Tito Jackson | — |
| "Everybody Is a Star" | Soulsation! | Sly Stone | Lead vocal shared by Jackie, Jermaine, Michael and Tito |
=== F ===
| Title | Originating album | Writer(s) | Notes |
| "Feelin' Alright" | Goin' Back to Indiana | Dave Mason | Live recording; Studio version issued on Come and Get It: The Rare Pearls |
| "Find Me A Girl" | Goin' Places | Gamble and Huff | — |
| "Forever Came Today" | Moving Violation | Holland–Dozier–Holland | — |
| "Frosty the Snowman" | The Jackson 5 Christmas Album | Steve Nelson; Walter E. Rollins | — |
=== G ===
| Title | Originating album | Writer(s) | Notes |
| "Get It Together" | G.I.T.: Get It Together | Berry Gordy; Don Fletcher; Hal Davis; Jerry Marcellino; Mel Larson | Alternative version featured on the 1986 Anthology |
| "Give It Up" | Triumph | Michael Jackson; Randy Jackson | — |
| "Give Love on Christmas Day" | The Jackson 5 Christmas Album | The Corporation | — |
| "Give Me Half a Chance" | Looking Back to Yesterday | Clinton Davis | |
| "Goin' Back to Indiana" | Third Album | The Corporation | Live version featured on Goin' Back to Indiana |
| "Goin' Places" | Goin' Places | Gamble and Huff | — |
| "Going My Way" | Come and Get It: The Rare Pearls | Donald Daniels Theresa McFaddin Richard Hutch | |
| "Good Times" | The Jacksons | Gamble and Huff | — |
| "Guess Who's Making Whoopee" | Come and Get It: The Rare Pearls | The Corporation | The song evolved into "Mama's Pearl", as Berry Gordy felt that the original lyrics were unsuitable for The Jackson 5's "wholesome" image. Bootleg recordings are known to exist. Appears as "Mama's Pearl (Demo)" on the compilation Come and Get It: The Rare Pearls (2012). |
=== H ===
| Title | Originating album | Writer(s) | Notes |
| "Hallelujah Day" | Skywriter | Christine Yarian; Freddie Perren | The first single on which Michael Jackson's voice can be heard breaking |
| "Harley" | 2300 Jackson Street | Jermaine Jackson Tito Jackson Jackie Jackson Randy Jackson Attala Zane Giles | Michael Jackson was not involved with the recording of this song |
| "Have Yourself a Merry Little Christmas" | The Jackson 5 Christmas Album | Hugh Martin; Ralph Blane | — |
| "Heartbreak Hotel" | Triumph | Michael Jackson | Featured an opening scream provided by the brothers' sister La Toya; Later retitled "This Place Hotel" to avoid confusion with Elvis Presley's "Heartbreak Hotel" |
| "Heaven Knows I Love You, Girl" | Goin' Places | Gamble and Huff | — |
| "Honey Chile" | Maybe Tomorrow | Richard Morris; Sylvia Moy | — |
| "Honey Love" | Moving Violation | Brian Holland; Edward Holland, Jr. Michael Lee Smith | — |
| "How Funky Is Your Chicken" | Third Album | Lester Lee Carr; Richard Hutch; Willie Hutch | — |
| "Hum Along and Dance" | G.I.T.: Get It Together | Barrett Strong; Norman Whitfield | Lead vocals, of which there were few, shared by Jackie and Tito; Uncut 15 minute version featured on Joyful Jukebox Music and Boogie |
=== I ===
| Title | Originating album | Writer(s) | Notes |
| "I Ain't Gonna Eat My Heart Out Anymore" | Boogie | Laurie Burton; Pam Sawyer | — |
| "I Am Love" | Dancing Machine | Don Fenceton; Jerry Marcellino; Mel Larson; Roderick Fancifer | — |
| "I Can Only Give You Love" | Lookin' Through the Windows | Richard Hutch; Willie Hutch | — |
| "I Can't Get Enough Of You" | Come and Get It: The Rare Pearls | Eddie Horan | |
| "I Can't Quit Your Love" | Skywriter | Kathy Wakefield; Leonard Caston, Jr. | — |
| "I Found a Love" | | Curtis Mayfield | Steeltown track |
| "I Found That Girl" | ABC | The Corporation | — |
| "I Got A Sure Thing" | Come and Get It: The Rare Pearls | William Bell Booker T. Jones | |
| "I Got The Feelin’" | Immortal | James Brown | Live snippet in Motown 1968 audition |
| "I Hear a Symphony" | Looking Back to Yesterday | Holland–Dozier–Holland | A version with an alternative vocal take was featured on the 1995 album Soulsation! |
| "(I Know) I'm Losing You" | Diana Ross Presents The Jackson 5 | Cornelius Grant; Edward Holland, Jr. Norman Whitfield | — |
| "I Like You the Way You Are (Don't Change Your Love On Me)" | Looking Back to Yesterday | Willie Hutch | — |
| "I Saw Mommy Kissing Santa Claus" | The Jackson 5 Christmas Album | Tommie Connor | — |
| "I Want to Take You Higher" | Goin' Back to Indiana | Sly Stone | Live |
| "I Want You Back" | Diana Ross Presents The Jackson 5 | The Corporation | Live version with an introduction by Bill Cosby and Tommy Smothers included on Goin' Back to Indiana |
| "I Was Made to Love Her" | Boogie | Henry Cosby; Lula Mae Hardaway; Stevie Wonder; Sylvia Moy | Alternative version featured on the 1986 compilations Anthology and Looking Back to Yesterday |
| "I Will Find a Way" | Maybe Tomorrow | The Corporation | — |
| "Iddint" | Come and Get It: The Rare Pearls | The Corporation | |
| "If I Can't Nobody Can" | Come and Get It: The Rare Pearls | Freddie Perren Christine Yarian | A prototype of sorts for "Do It Baby" |
| "If I Don't Love You This Way" | Dancing Machine | Leon Ware; Pam Sawyer | Michael Jackson had originally recorded the song for a solo album, but it was included on Dancing Machine instead |
| "If I Have to Move a Mountain" | Lookin' Through the Windows | The Corporation | Long version issued on Come and Get It: The Rare Pearls |
| "If The Shoe Don't Fit" | Come and Get It: The Rare Pearls | The Corporation | |
| "If You Want Heaven" | Come and Get It: The Rare Pearls | Kathy Wakefield Annette Tucker | |
| "If You'd Only Believe" | 2300 Jackson Street | Billie Hughes; Jermaine Jackson; Roxanne Seeman | Michael Jackson was not involved with the recording of this song; Is the theme song and finale of "The Jackson Family Honors", TV special, which took place at the MGM Grand Garden Arena in Las Vegas, February 1994. The song was sung by The Jackson Family, including performance by Michael Jackson. |
| "I'll Be There" | Third Album | Berry Gordy; Bob West; Hal Davis; Willie Hutch | |
| "I'll Bet You" | ABC | George Clinton; Patrick Lindsey; Sidney Barnes | — |
| "I'll Try You'll Try (Maybe We'll All Get By)" | I Want You Back! Unreleased Masters | David Jones Jr. Wade Brown Jr. Johnny Bristol | |
| "I'm Glad It Rained" | Soulsation! | Allen Levinsky; Arthur Stokes; Dana Meyers; Floyd Weatherspoon | — |
| "I'm So Happy" | | Alphonzo Mizell; Berry Gordy; Deke Richards; Frederick Perren | B-side of "Sugar Daddy" |
| "I'm Your Sunny One (He's My Sunny Boy)" | Come and Get It: The Rare Pearls | William Robinson | A Supremes cover |
| "It All Begins and Ends With Love" | Dancing Machine | Don Fecelon; Jerry Marcellino; Mel Larson | The only song to feature all 5 brothers singing lead in their natural voices. |
| "It's Great to Be Here" | Maybe Tomorrow | The Corporation | — |
| "It's Too Late to Change the Time" | G.I.T.: Get It Together | Leon Ware; Pam Sawyer | — |
| "It's Your Thing" | Soulsation! | O'Kelly Isley, Jr. Ronald Isley; Rudolph Isley | — |
=== J ===
| Title | Originating album | Writer(s) | Notes |
| "Jam Session" | | Sam Wibourn | Steeltown track; Also known as "Jam Session (Part 1)" |
| "Jamie" | Soulsation! | Barrett Strong; William "Mickey" Stevenson | — |
| "Joyful Jukebox Music" | Joyful Jukebox Music | Tom Bee; Michael Edward Campbell | — |
| "Jumbo Sam" | Come and Get It: The Rare Pearls | Mel Larson Joe Marcellino Don Fenceton | |
| "Jump for Joy" | Goin' Places | Cynthia Biggs; Dexter Wansel | — |
| "Just a Little Misunderstanding" | Soulsation! | Clarence Paul; Morris Broadnax; Stevie Wonder | — |
| "Just Because I Love You" | Boogie | James Alexander; Willie Hutch | — |
=== K ===
| Title | Originating album | Writer(s) | Notes |
| "Keep An Eye" | Come and Get It: The Rare Pearls | Nickolas Ashford Valerie Simpson | |
| "Keep Her" | — | Jackie Jackson Jermaine Jackson Tito Jackson Attala Zane Giles | Michael Jackson was not involved with the recording of this song; Previously unreleased until issued as a b-side on the single "2300 Jackson Street" from the 2300 Jackson Street album |
| "Keep Off The Grass" | Come and Get It: The Rare Pearls | Deke Richards | |
| "Keep on Dancing" | The Jacksons | Dexter Wansel | — |
=== L ===
| Title | Originating album | Writer(s) | Notes |
| "Label Me Love" | Come and Get It: The Rare Pearls | Clay McMurray John Glover James Dean | Background vocals by Different Shades of Brown |
| "La-La (Means I Love You)" | ABC | Thom Bell; William Hart | — |
| "Let's Go Back To Day One" | Come and Get It: The Rare Pearls | Patrice Holloway Gloria Jones | |
| "Let's Have a Party" | Soulsation! | Winifred Atwell | — |
| "Listen I'll Tell You How" | I Want You Back! Unreleased Masters | Bobby Taylor N. Moloci | |
| "Little Bitty Pretty One" | Lookin' Through the Windows | Bobby Day | — |
| "Living Together" | The Jacksons | Dexter Wansel | — |
| "Lonely Heart" | | Gordon Keith; Shirley Cartman | Steeltown track |
| "Lookin' Through the Windows" | Lookin' Through the Windows | Hal Davis | — |
| "Love Call" | I Want You Back! Unreleased Masters | Willie Hutch Richard Hutch Graves Kennedy | |
| "Love Comes in Different Flavors" | I Want You Back! Unreleased Masters | Deke Richards Jerry Marcellino Mel Larsen | |
| "Love is the Thing You Need" | Joyful Jukebox Music | Mizell Brothers | — |
| "Love Scenes" | Soulsation! | Mel Larson; Jerry Marcellino | — |
| "Love Song" | | Clifton Davis | B-side of "Lookin' Through the Windows" |
| "Love Trip" | Come and Get It: The Rare Pearls | Jack Perricone Dug McClure | |
| "Lovely One" | Triumph | Michael Jackson; Randy Jackson | — |
| "Love's Gone Bad" | Boogie | Holland–Dozier–Holland | — |
| "Lucky Day" | I Want You Back! Unreleased Masters | Don Daniels Theresa McFaddin | Also known as "Miss Lucky Day" |
| "LuLu" | Soulsation! | Ekunday Paris; Judy Lamppu; Kathy Wakefield; Padineyi Paris | — |
=== M ===
| Title | Originating album | Writer(s) | Notes |
| "Make Tonight All Mine" | Joyful Jukebox Music | Christine Yarian; Freddie Perren | — |
| "Makin' Life A Little Easier For You" | Come and Get It: The Rare Pearls | The Corporation | |
| "Mama I Gotta Brand New Thing (Don't Say No)" | G.I.T.: Get It Together | Norman Whitfield | — |
| "Mama's Pearl" | Third Album | Alphonzo Mizell; Berry Gordy; Deke Richards; Freddie Perren | Original title is "Guess Who's Making Whoopie with Your Girlfriend" |
| "Mama Told Me Not to Come" | Come and Get It: The Rare Pearls | Randy Newman | Eric Burdon cover |
| "Man of War" | Goin' Places | Gamble and Huff | — |
| "Man's Temptation" | I Want You Back! Unreleased Masters | Curtis Mayfield | |
| "Maria" | 2300 Jackson Street | Jermaine Jackson | — |
| "Maybe Tomorrow" | Maybe Tomorrow | The Corporation | — |
| "Midnight Rendezvous" | 2300 Jackson Street | Attala Zane Giles; Jackie Jackson; Jermaine Jackson; Randy Jackson; Sigmund Esco Jackson, Jr. Tito Jackson | Michael Jackson was not involved with the recording of this song |
| "Money Honey" | Soulsation! | Jesse Stone | — |
| "Movin'" | Come and Get It: The Rare Pearls | Jackie DeShannon Jimmy Holiday Randy Myers | |
| "Moving Violation" | Moving Violation | Donald Fenceton; Jerry Marcellino; Mel Larson; Roderick H Rancifer | — |
| "Music's Takin' Over" | Goin' Places | Gene McFadden; John Whitehead; Victor Carstarphen | — |
| "My Cherie Amour" | Diana Ross Presents The Jackson 5 | Hank Cosby; Stevie Wonder; Sylvia Moy | — |
| "My Girl" | | Smokey Robinson Ronald White | Steeltown track; Michael solo version in album Ben (1972) |
| "My Little Baby" | Maybe Tomorrow | The Corporation | — |
=== N ===
| Title | Originating album | Writer(s) | Notes |
| "Never Can Say Goodbye" | Maybe Tomorrow | Clifton Davis | — |
| "Never Had a Dream Come True" | ABC | Henry Cosby; Sylvia Moy | — |
| "Nobody" | Diana Ross Presents The Jackson 5 | The Corporation | — |
| "Nothin' (That Compares 2 U)" | 2300 Jackson Street | Antonio Reid; Kenny Edmonds | Michael Jackson was not involved with the recording of this song |
=== O ===
| Title | Originating album | Writer(s) | Notes |
| "Oh, How Happy" | Third Album | Edwin Starr | — |
| "Oh, I've Been Bless'd" | Boogie | Bobby Taylor | — |
| "One Day I'll Marry You" | Boogie | Pam Sawyer; LaVerne Ware | — |
| "One More Chance" | ABC | The Corporation | — |
| "One More Chance" | Victory | Randy Jackson | Also exists a version covered by their sister Janet, released 1993, B-side of "If" |
| "Ooh, I'd Love to Be With You" | Skywriter | Mizell Brothers | — |
| "Our Love" | Come and Get It: The Rare Pearls | Deke Richards | |
=== P ===
| Title | Originating album | Writer(s) | Notes |
| "Papa Was a Rollin' Stone" | In Japan! | Barrett Strong; Norman Whitfield | Live version |
| "Penny Arcade" | Boogie | Mel Larson; Jerry Marcellino; Deke Richards | — |
| "Petals" | Maybe Tomorrow | The Corporation | — |
| "Play It Up" | 2300 Jackson Street | Attala Zane Giles; Jackie Jackson; Jermaine Jackson; Randy Jackson; Sigmund Esco Jackson, Jr. Tito Jackson | Michael Jackson was not involved with the recording of this song |
| "Please Come Back to Me" | — | Mike Daily; Robert Brookins | Michael Jackson was not involved with the recording of this song; Released as a bonus track on a 12" single from the 2300 Jackson Street album |
| "Pride and Joy" | Joyful Jukebox Music | Marvin Gaye; Norman Whitfield; William "Mickey" Stevenson | — |
| "Private Affair" | 2300 Jackson Street | Diane Warren | Michael Jackson was not involved with the recording of this song |
| "Push Me Away" | Destiny | Jackie Jackson; Marlon Jackson; Michael Jackson; Randy Jackson; Tito Jackson | — |
=== R ===
| Title | Originating album | Writer(s) | Notes |
| "Reach In" | Third Album | Beatrice Verdi | — |
| "Reach Out I'll Be There" | Soulsation! | Holland–Dozier–Holland | — |
| "Ready or Not Here I Come (Can't Hide from Love)" | Third Album | Thom Bell; William Hart | On some issues the title is "Ready or Not (Here I Come)" |
| "Reflections" | G.I.T.: Get It Together | Holland–Dozier–Holland | — |
| "Rudolph the Red-Nosed Reindeer" | The Jackson 5 Christmas Album | Johnny Marks | — |
=== S ===
| Title | Originating album | Writer(s) | Notes |
| "Santa Claus Is Coming to Town" | The Jackson 5 Christmas Album | Haven Gillespie; J. Fred Coots | — |
| "Saturday Night at the Movies" | | Barry Mann; Cynthia Weil | Steeltown track |
| "Shake Your Body (Down to the Ground)" | Destiny | Michael Jackson; Randy Jackson | — |
| "She" | 2300 Jackson Street | Gene Griffin; Aaron Hall | Michael Jackson was not involved with the recording of this song |
| "She's a Rhythm Child" | Dancing Machine | Clarence Drayton; Hal Davis; Weldon Dean Parks | — |
| "She's Good" | Maybe Tomorrow | The Corporation | — |
| "Show You the Way to Go" | The Jacksons | Gamble and Huff | — |
| "Since I Lost My Baby" | Come and Get It: The Rare Pearls | Smokey RobinsonWarren Moore | The Temptations cover |
| "Sing a Simple Song" | Motown At Hollywood Palace | Sly Stone | Live, medley with "Can You Remember"; Alternative mix issued on 2000 edition of Anthology |
| "Skywriter" | Skywriter | Donald Fenceton; Jerry Marcellino; Mel Larson | — |
| "Some Girls Want Me for Their Lover" | | Gordon Keith | Was re-titled "Michael the Lover" when included on The Beginning Years 1967-1968 |
| "Someday at Christmas" | The Jackson 5 Christmas Album | Bryan Wells; Ron Miller | — |
| "Someone's Standing In My Love Light" | Come and Get It: The Rare Pearls | Kathy Wakefield Annette Tucker | |
| "Soul Jerk" | | Gordon Keith | Steeltown track |
| "Stand!" | Diana Ross Presents The Jackson 5 | Sly Stone | The first song The Jackson 5 recorded for Motown Records; Live version included on Goin' Back to Indiana |
| "Standing in the Shadows of Love" | Diana Ross Presents The Jackson 5 | Holland–Dozier–Holland | — |
| "State of Shock" | Victory | Michael Jackson; Randy Hansen | Recorded by The Jacksons and The Rolling Stones' frontman Mick Jagger |
| "Stormy Monday" | | Billy Eckstine; Bob Crowder; Earl Hines | Steeltown track |
| "Strength of One Man" | The Jacksons | Gene McFadden | — |
| "Style of Life" | The Jacksons | Michael Jackson; Tito Jackson | — |
| "Sugar Daddy" | Greatest Hits | The Corporation | — |
| "Superstition" | In Japan! | Stevie Wonder | Live, Stevie Wonder cover |
| "Surprise Song" | | | Demo for exclusive single The Jacksons World Club |
=== T ===
| Title | Originating album | Writer(s) | Notes |
| "Teenage Symphony" | Looking Back to Yesterday | Gloria Jones; Hal Davis; Marilyn McLeod | Alternative version featured on the 1986 Anthology |
| "Thank You Falettinme Be Mice Elf Agin" | Live at the Forum | Sly Stone | Live, cover version of Sly & the Family Stone's track |
| "That's How Love Is" | I Want You Back! Unreleased Masters | Deke Richards Freddie Perren Alphonso Mizell | Long version issued on Come and Get It: The Rare Pearls |
| "That's What You Get (for Being Polite) | Destiny | Michael Jackson; Randy Jackson | — |
| "The Boogie Man" | Skywriter | Deke Richards | |
| "The Christmas Song" | The Jackson 5 Christmas Album | Mel Tormé; Robert Wells | — |
| "The Day Basketball Was Saved" | Goin' Back to Indiana | Bill Angelos; Buz Kohan; Dick De Benedictis | — |
| "The Eternal Light" | Joyful Jukebox Music | Mel Larson; Jerry Marcellino | — |
| "The Hurt" | Victory | David Paich; Michael Jackson; Randy Jackson; Steve Porcaro | — |
| "The Life of the Party" | Dancing Machine | Clarence Drayton; Hal Davis; Tanny Smith | — |
| "The Little Drummer Boy" | The Jackson 5 Christmas Album | Katherine K. Davis | — |
| "The Love I Saw in You Was Just a Mirage" | Third Album | Marvin Tarplin; Smokey Robinson | — |
| "The Love You Save" | ABC | The Corporation | — |
| "The Mirrors of My Mind" | Dancing Machine | Charlotte O-Hare; Don Fletcher; Nita Garfield | — |
| "The Tracks of My Tears" | | Marv Tarplin; Pete Moore; Smokey Robinson | Steeltown track; On some issues the title is "Tracks Of My Tears" |
| "The Wall" | Maybe Tomorrow | Jerry Marcellino; Mel Larson; Pam Sawyer | — |
| "The Young Folks" | ABC | Allen Story; George Gordy | — |
| "There Was a Time" | Live at the Forum | James Brown | Live, cover version of James Brown's track |
| "Things I Do for You" | Destiny | Jackie Jackson; Marlon Jackson; Michael Jackson; Randy Jackson; Tito Jackson | — |
| "Think Happy" | The Jacksons | Gamble and Huff | — |
| "Through Thick and Thin" | Joyful Jukebox Music | Mel Larson; Jerry Marcellino | — |
| "Time Explosion" | Moving Violation | Mel Larson; Jerry Marcellino | — |
| "Time Out for the Burglar" | — | Bernard Edwards; Jackie Jackson; Randy Jackson | Written as the theme song for the Whoopi Goldberg film Burglar (1987); First Jackson 5/Jacksons recording that did not involve Michael Jackson; Also didn't feature Marlon, who had left The Jacksons to pursue a solo career |
| "Time Waits for No One" | Triumph | Jackie Jackson; Randy Jackson | — |
| "To Know" | Lookin' Through the Windows | The Corporation | — |
| "Torture" | Victory | Jackie Jackson; Kathy Wakefield | — |
| "Touch" | Skywriter | Frank Wilson; Pam Sawyer | — |
| "True Love Can Be Beautiful" | ABC | Bobby Taylor; Jeanna Jackson; Leonard Caston, Jr. | — |
=== U ===
| Title | Originating album | Writer(s) | Notes |
| "Under the Boardwalk" | | Arthur Resnick; Kenny Young | Steeltown track; An overdubbed version of this song was released on the 1989 album The Beginning Years 1967-1968, prior to the inclusion of the original recording being featured on Big Boy in 1993 |
| "Up on the House Top" | The Jackson 5 Christmas Album | Benjamin Hanby | — |
| "Up On The Roof" | Come and Get It: The Rare Pearls | Gerry Goffin Carole King | The Drifters cover |
| "Uppermost" | Skywriter | Clifton Davis | — |
=== W ===
| Title | Originating album | Writer(s) | Notes |
| "Wait" | Victory | David Paich; Jackie Jackson | — |
| "Walk On" | Goin' Back to Indiana | Suzanne de Passe; Jackie Jackson; Marlon Jackson; Michael Jackson; Randy Jackson; Tito Jackson | Live, instrumental track, usually performed as a part of a medley before "The Love You Save"; Adapted from Isaac Hayes' version of "Walk on By" |
| "Walk Right Now" | Triumph | Jackie Jackson; Michael Jackson; Randy Jackson | — |
| "We Can Change the World" | Victory | Tito Jackson; Wayne Arnold | — |
| "We Can Have Fun" | Soulsation! | Janie Bradford; Richard Wylie | — |
| "We Don't Have To Be Over 21 (to Fall in Love)" | | Sherman Nesbarry | Steeltown track; Released as a single by Steeltown Records in the United States in 1968.; Later re-titled "You Don't Have To Be Over Twenty One to Fall in Love)" |
| "We Wish You a Merry Christmas" | Free Soul | Hugh Martin Ralph Blane | A snippet of the song was sung at the end of the brothers' version of "Have Yourself A Merry Little Christmas" |
| "We're Gonna Change Our Style" | Joyful Jukebox Music | Clarence Drayton; Judy Cheeks | — |
| "We're Gonna Have a Good Time" | In Japan! | Tom Baird; Gil Bridges; Ed Guzman; Ray Monette; Mark Olson; Pete Rivera | Live |
| "We're Here to Entertain You" | Joyful Jukebox Music | Charlotte O'Hara; Hal Davis; Nita Garfield | — |
| "(We're The) Music Makers" | Come and Get It: The Rare Pearls | A. Ross T. Gibbs | Shortest Jackson 5 song |
| "(We've Got) Blue Skies" | Maybe Tomorrow | Chris Clark; Delores Wilkinson; Patrick Stephenson; Tommy Bee | — |
| "What You Don't Know" | Dancing Machine | Gene Marcellino; Jerry Marcellino; Mel Larson | — |
| "What's So Good About Goodbye" | Motown Unreleased 1969 | William Robinson | |
| "Whatever You Got, I Want" | Dancing Machine | Gene Marcellino; Jerry Marcellino; Mel Larson | Michael Jackson revealed in a 1974 interview with Don Cornelius that the song was originally recorded for one of his solo albums. |
| "When I Look at You" | — | Jackie Jackson Monty Seward | Michael Jackson was not involved with the recording of this song; Released as a bonus track on the single "2300 Jackson Street" from the 2300 Jackson Street album |
| "Who's Lovin' You" | Diana Ross Presents The Jackson 5 | Smokey Robinson | Remixed live version appeared on the 1992 soundtrack album, The Jacksons: An American Dream; Original live recording featured as a bonus track to the "Two Classic Albums on One CD" re-issue version of Goin' Back to Indiana and Lookin' Through the Windows |
| "Window Shopping" | Joyful Jukebox Music | Clarence Drayton; Pam Sawyer; Tamy Lester Smith | — |
| "Wondering Who" | Triumph | Jackie Jackson; Randy Jackson | — |
| "World of Sunshine" | Skywriter | Jerry Marcellino; Mel Larson | — |
| "Would Ya Would Ya Baby" | Come and Get It: The Rare Pearls | Freddie Perren | Working title "When The Real Thing Comes Along"; Later re-titled for instrumental release as "Tryin' To Get Over" |
=== Y ===
| Title | Originating album | Writer(s) | Notes |
| "You Ain't Giving Me What I Want (So I'm Taking it All Back)" | Soulsation! | Bobby Taylor; Gus McKinney; Marty Coleman; Wesley Henderson | Originally titled "You're A, B, C's And D's" |
| "You Better Watch Out" | Come and Get It: The Rare Pearls | Bonnie LeGrande Lorraine Durham | |
| "You Can't Hurry Love" | Come and Get It: The Rare Pearls | Holland–Dozier–Holland | The Supremes cover |
| "You Made Me What I Am" | Skywriter | The Corporation | — |
| "You Need Love Like I Do (Don't You?)" | G.I.T.: Get It Together | Barrett Strong; Norman Whitfield | — |
| "(You Were Made) Especially for Me" | Moving Violation | Brian Holland; Michael L. Smith | — |
| "Your Ways" | Triumph | Jackie Jackson | — |
| "You're Good For Me" | Looking Back to Yesterday | Eddie Horran | — |
| "You're My Best Friend, My Love" | Joyful Jukebox Music | Christine Yarian; Samuel Brown III | — |
| "You've Changed" | Diana Ross Presents The Jackson 5 | Bill Carey; Carl Fischer | Was also recorded at Steeltown and appeared on the b-side of the single "Big Boy"; Motown mistakenly titled the song "You've Changed Me" on early pressing of the album sleeve, as they had confused it with another song in their extensive catalogue. |
| "You've Got a Friend" | Got To Be There | Carole King | Live recording on Live at the Forum album |
| "You've Really Got A Hold On Me" | The Ultimate Rarities Collection 1: Motown Sings Motown Treasures | Smokey Robinson | Michael Jackson solo version in Farewell My Summer Love |
=== Z ===
| Title | Originating album | Writer(s) | Notes |
| "Zip-a-Dee-Doo-Dah" | Diana Ross Presents The Jackson 5 | Allie Wrubel; Ray Gilbert | — |

== Unreleased songs ==
| Song | Notes | Ref |
|---|---|---|
| "7 Rooms of Gloom" | — | |
| "A Place in the Sun" | — | |
| "A Pretty Face Is" | The song was originally intended for The Jackson 5 or as a duet between Stevie Wonder and Michael; the two reportedly recorded the song for Wonder's 1987 Characters album | |
| "After the Storm (The Sun Will Shine)" | — | |
| "Ain't No Mountain High Enough" | The Jackson brothers recorded two versions of this song; one mid-tempo with a spoken intro (per Diana Ross' version), and the other up-tempo | |
| "Ain't Too Proud to Beg" | — | |
| "Ave Maria" | Track recorded for The Jackson 5's Christmas album around 1970, but which did not make the final cut | |
| "Baby I Need Your Loving" | — | |
| "Baby It's Love" | | |
| "Back in My Arms Again" | — | |
| "Bad Company" | Song written by Tito for the Jacksons' Victory album, but which failed to make the final cut. | |
| "Be My Girl" | A song also claimed to have been performed live by The Jackson 5 at a concert in 1972. It was alleged at the time that "Be My Girl" would be the group's latest single, featuring Jermaine on lead vocals. | |
| "Blowin' in the Wind" | — | |
| "Buffalo Bill" | Song written by Michael. First mentioned by manager Frank DiLeo before the release of The Jacksons' Victory album in 1984. | |
| "Can I Get a Witness" | — | |
| "Children's Christmas Song" | Track recorded for The Jackson 5's Christmas album around 1970, but which did not make the final cut | |
| "Christmas Everyday" | Track recorded for The Jackson 5's Christmas album around 1970, but which did not make the final cut | |
| "Do You Love Me" | — | |
| "Fingertips" | — | |
| "For Once in My Life" | — | |
| "For the Best of My Love" | | |
| "God Rest Ye Merry Gentlemen" | Track recorded for The Jackson 5's Christmas album around 1970, but which did not make the final cut | |
| "Heaven Help Us All" | — | |
| "How Sweet It Is (To Be Loved by You)" | — | |
| "I Can't Help Myself (Sugar Pie Honey Bunch)" | — | |
| "I Got a Feeling" | — | |
| "I Got the Feelin'" | — | |
| "I Heard It Through the Grapevine" | — | |
| "I Saved My Love for You" | | |
| "I Want You To Come Home For Christmas" | Track recorded for The Jackson 5's Christmas album around 1970, but which did not make the final cut | |
| "If You Really Love Me" | — | |
| "I'll Turn To Stone" | — | |
| "It's Christmas Time" | Track recorded for The Jackson 5's Christmas album around 1970, but which did not make the final cut | |
| "It's the Same Old Song" | Features Jermaine singing lead vocals | |
| "I've Gotta Be Me" | — | |
| "Jackson Man" | A song recorded for Steeltown Records, and said to be "somewhat of a tribute to their father", Joseph. | |
| "Jingle Bells" | Track recorded for The Jackson 5's Christmas album around 1970, but which did not make the final cut | |
| "Joy to the World" | Track recorded for The Jackson 5's Christmas album around 1970, but which did not make the final cut | |
| "Kentucky Road" | | |
| "Lavender's Blue" | Leaked in HQ online on October 10, 2023 | |
| "(Loneliness Made Me Realize) It's You That I Need" | — | |
| "Love Feels Like Fire" | — | |
| "Love Go Away" | — | |
| "Loving You Is Sweeter Than Ever" | — | |
| "My Favorite Things" | Track recorded for The Jackson 5's Christmas album around 1970, but which did not make the final cut | |
| "Neither One of Us (Wants to Be the First to Say Goodbye)" | — | |
| "No News Is Good News" | A song worked on with Stevie Wonder around 1974 | |
| "Nona" | Song written by Jackie for the Jacksons' Victory album, but which failed to make the final cut | |
| "Ooh Baby Baby" | — | |
| "Power" | Song written by Jackie for the Jacksons' Victory album, but which failed to make the final cut | |
| "Purple Snowflakes" | Track recorded for The Jackson 5's Christmas album around 1970, but which did not make the final cut | |
| "Quicksand" | — | |
| "Sad Souvenirs" | — | |
| "Shake Me, Wake Me (When It's Over)" | — | |
| "She Say 'Want'" | Song recorded for Motown Records, also known to fans as "She Say What" | |
| "Signed, Sealed, Delivered I'm Yours" | — | |
| "Silent Night" | Track recorded for The Jackson 5's Christmas album around 1970, but which did not make the final cut | |
| "Silver Bells" | Track recorded for The Jackson 5's Christmas album around 1970, but which did not make the final cut | |
| "Since You've Been Gone" | — | |
| "Slipped Away" | Song written by Michael and Marlon for the Jacksons' Triumph album around 1980, but which failed to make the final cut | |
| "Still In Love With You" | Song written by Michael for the Jacksons' Victory album, featuring Randy on lead vocals. It failed to make the final cut for the album. | |
| "Take My Heart" | — | |
| "That Girl" | Song written by The Jacksons circa 1978–1980, but which failed to appear on either Destiny or Triumph | |
| "That's What Christmas Means to Me" | Track recorded for The Jackson 5's Christmas album around 1970, but which did not make the final cut | |
| "To Sir, with Love" | — | |
| "Twinkle, Twinkle Little Me" | Track recorded for The Jackson 5's Christmas album around 1970, but which did not make the final cut | |
| "Uptight (Everything's Alright)" | — | |
| "We Love You" | Song written by Michael for the Jacksons' Triumph album around 1980, but which failed to make the final cut | |
| "What Does It Take (To Win Your Love)" | — | |
| "Where Did Our Love Go" | — | |
| "Where Do I Stand" | Song written by Marlon for the Jacksons' Victory album, but which failed to make the final cut. He later recorded the song for his 1987 debut solo album Baby Tonight. | |
| "White Christmas" | Track recorded for The Jackson 5's Christmas album around 1970, but which did not make the final cut | |
| "Yester-Me, Yester-You, Yesterday" | — | |
| "You're My Everything" | — | |
| "You're the Only One" | — | |

== Collaborations ==
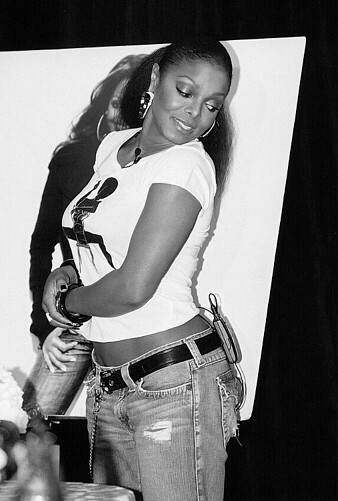
Four of the Jackson brothers collaborated with their sister Janet on "Don't Stand Another Chance".

| Song | Artist | Album | Notes | Ref |
|---|---|---|---|---|
| "Daddy's Home" | Jermaine Jackson | Jermaine | Recorded by Jermaine with his brothers on backing vocals | |
| "Didn't I (Blow Your Mind This Time)" | Jackie Jackson | Jackie Jackson | Recorded by Jackie with his brothers on backing vocals | |
| "Do I Owe" | Jackie Jackson | Jackie Jackson | Recorded by Jackie with his brothers on backing vocals | |
| "Does Your Mama Know About Me" | Jermaine Jackson | Come Into My Life | Recorded by Jermaine with his brothers on backing vocals | |
| "I Need You" | Jermaine Jackson | Soulsation | Recorded by Jermaine with his brothers on backing vocals | |
| "I Only Have Eyes for You" | Jermaine Jackson | Jermaine | Recorded by Jermaine with his brothers on backing vocals | |
| "Love Don't Want to Leave" | Jackie Jackson | Jackie Jackson | Recorded by Jackie with his brothers on backing vocals | |
| "So In Love" | Jermaine Jackson | Come Into My Life | Recorded by Jermaine with his brothers on backing vocals | |
| "That's How Love Goes" | Jermaine Jackson | Jermaine | Recorded by Jermaine with his brothers on backing vocals | |
| "This Is It" | Michael Jackson | This Is It | Recorded by Michael with all his brothers on backing vocals | |
| "You Haven't Done Nothin'" | Stevie Wonder | Fulfillingness' First Finale | Recorded by Stevie Wonder with "Doo Doo Wopsssss" credited to The Jackson 5 | |
| "You're in Good Hands" | Jermaine Jackson | Come Into My Life | Recorded by Jermaine with his brothers on backing vocals | |
| "You've Really Got A Hold On Me" | Bobby Taylor | Motown Unreleased 1969 | Recorded by Bobby Taylor with The Jackson 5 on backing vocals in 1969: released in 2019 | |

Also The Jackson 5 sang backing vocals on a number of solo Motown songs by Michael.

== See also ==
- List of record labels
- The Jackson 5 discography
