= Looking Back to Yesterday =

1986 compilation album by Michael Jackson

Compilation album by Michael Jackson
- Released: February 11, 1986
- Recorded: December 1969 – December 1973
- Studio: Motown Recording Studios (Los Angeles, California)
- Genre: R&B
- Length: 36:46
- Label: Motown
- Producer: Hal Davis; Jerry Marcellino; Mel Larson; Bob Crewe

Michael Jackson chronology
| Farewell My Summer Love (1984) | Looking Back to Yesterday (1986) | Anthology (1986) |

Singles from Looking Back to Yesterday
- 1. "Love's Gone Bad" Released: 1986 (Canada)

Looking Back to Yesterday is a compilation album released on February 11, 1986, featuring tracks from American singer Michael Jackson during his tenure at Motown in the late 1960s and early 1970s, both by himself and with The Jackson 5. As part of Motown's Never-Before-Released series, all songs were previously unreleased except for "Love's Gone Bad" and "I Was Made to Love Her"; alternate, longer versions had already been released in 1979 on the Jackson 5 compilation Boogie.

The album was re-released in August 1991 and re-titled Looking Back to Yesterday: A Young Michael and sold over half a million copies. It was re-released again as part of Hello World: The Motown Solo Collection in 2009.

== Track listing ==
All songs by Michael Jackson except tracks 2, 3, 4, 7, 9 and 11, which are by The Jackson 5; all tracks produced by Hal Davis except tracks 6 (Jerry Marcellino and Mel Larson) and 12 (Bob Crewe). All writer info found in the Hello World: The Motown Solo Collection (2009) liner notes.

| No. | Title | Writer(s) | Recorded | Length |
|---|---|---|---|---|
| 1. | "When I Come of Age" | Weldon Dean Parks/Don Fletcher/Hal Davis | recorded March 1972 – 1973, during the Jackson 5's G.I.T.: Get It Together sessions | 2:37 |
| 2. | "Teenage Symphony" | Gloria Jones/Hal Davis/Marilyn McLeod | recorded November 1972 – April 1973, during G.I.T.: Get It Together and Dancing Machine sessions | 2:45 |
| 3. | "I Hear a Symphony" | Holland-Dozier-Holland | originally recorded by Diana Ross & The Supremes; recorded January 1970, during ABC sessions | 3:01 |
| 4. | "Give Me Half a Chance" | Clifton Davis | recorded December 1969 – June 1970, during ABC and Third Album sessions, mixed 1971 | 3:26 |
| 5. | "Love's Gone Bad" (originally released in longer form in 1979's Boogie) | Holland-Dozier-Holland | Originally recorded by Chris Clark, recorded August 1972, mixed early 1973, during the Jackson 5's Skywriter sessions; | 3:08 |
| 6. | "Lonely Teardrops" | Berry Gordy, Jr./Gwen Gordy/Tyran Carlo | original version by Jackie Wilson; recorded July – August 1972 | 2:40 |
| 7. | "You're Good for Me" | Eddie Horan | recorded December 1973, during G.I.T.: Get It Together sessions | 3:15 |
| 8. | "That's What Love Is Made Of" | Robert Rogers/William Robinson/Warren Moore | originally by The Miracles; recorded December 1969 & January 1970 – December 1971, during the Jackson 5's Diana Ross Presents The Jackson 5 and ABC sessions, mixed 1971, Got to Be There sessions and outtake | 3:24 |
| 9. | "I Like You the Way You Are (Don't Change Your Love on Me)" | Willie Hutch | recorded March and May 1971 – 1972, during Maybe Tomorrow sessions | 2:57 |
| 10. | "Who's Lookin' for a Lover" | Jacqueline D. Hilliard/Leon Ware | recorded December 1972 – 1973, during Music & Me sessions | 2:50 |
| 11. | "I Was Made to Love Her" (originally released in longer form in 1979's Boogie) | Henry Cosby/Lula Hardaway/Sylvia Moy/Stevie Wonder | originally by Stevie Wonder, recorded December 1969 and 1972, during ABC sessions | 3:20 |
| 12. | "If'n I Was God" | Robert Sherman/Richard Sherman | originally by Bobby Goldsboro, recorded April 11 – May 1973, during Music & Me and the Jackson 5 G.I.T.: Get It Together sessions | 3:02 |

== Singles ==
"Love's Gone Bad" (b/w "I Hear a Symphony") (released as a promotional single in Canada).
