= Anthology (The Jackson 5 album) =

Greatest hits album by the Jackson 5
- Released: June 15, 1976
- Recorded: 1969–1975
- Genre: R&B; soul
- Label: Motown
- Producer: The Corporation; Bobby Taylor; Hal Davis; Norman Whitfield

The Jackson 5 chronology
Moving Violation (1975)	Anthology (1976)	Joyful Jukebox Music (1976)
The Jacksons Story (2004)	Gold (2005)	The Motown Years (2008)

Alternative cover
- 1986 double CD release

Alternative cover
- 2000 double CD release

Alternative cover
- 2005 "Gold" release

Alternative cover
- 2006 release

Anthology was originally released as a triple-album greatest hits set by legendary Motown family unit, The Jackson 5, in 1976. It was the group's second greatest hits compilation, after Greatest Hits (1971). It was at this point that most of the Jackson brothers (with the glaring exception of Jermaine Jackson) had left the Motown label to join CBS Records. Motown president Berry Gordy once said that the Jackson 5 were "the last superstars to come off the Motown assembly line"; after the group left the label, Motown would not have another act to equal its success until Boyz II Men in the 1990s.

Later repackagings of Anthology have compiled it as a double compact disc set. The most recent re-release, issued by Motown in 2000 (the first time the release doesn't contain any hits from Michael or Jermaine), was repackaged in 2005 in North America as part of its Gold series, and in 2006 internationally as The Jackson 5 Story.

== Critical reception ==
Professional ratings
Review scores
Source	Rating
Christgau's Record Guide	B+
The Rolling Stone Album Guide	5/5 stars

Reviewing Anthology in Christgau's Record Guide: Rock Albums of the Seventies (1981), American music journalist Robert Christgau wrote:

"The only one of Motown's triple-LP retrospectives to concentrate on (or even include much) '70s music documents an institution in decline. Initially, the company marshalls everything it's got for one final push—not for nothing was the group's songwriting-production combine called The Corporation, and it's a measure of their seriousness that they asked the Crusaders to help with the tracks. But within two years they'd run out of gas—all the mini-comebacks after that, even the dancing-machine coup, were flukes. The proof is that the old-formula filler often surpasses the desperate imitations that became minor hits—better 'E-Ne-Me-Ne-Mi-Ne-Moe' than 'Skywriter' or 'A Little Bit of You.' The selection includes Michael's hits, Jermaine's hit, the works, and as the other albums disappear it will become essential in its way. But not to listen to, much."

== Track listings ==
1976 Triple LP (US)	1977 Double LP (Int'l)	1986 double CD	2000 double CD	Song	Length
1.1	1.1	1.01	1.01	"I Want You Back"	2:58
1.2	1.2	1.02	1.03	"ABC"	2:58
1.3		1.03		"Don't Know Why I Love You"	3:50
1.4^{1}	1.4	1.04	1.08	"I'll Be There"	3:59
1.5	1.3	1.05	1.05	"The Love You Save"	2:58
1.6		1.06	1.06	"I Found That Girl"	2:56
2.1	4.4	1.20	2.12	"I Am Love"	7:30
2.2		2.07		"Body Language (Do The Love Dance)"	4:05
2.3	4.5	2.08	2.14	"Forever Came Today"	6:25
3.1	1.5	1.07	1.10	"Mama's Pearl"	3:01
3.2	1.7	2.09		"Got to Be There" (MJ)	3:23
3.3		1.09	1.09	"Goin' Back to Indiana"	3:30
3.4	1.6	1.10	1.12	"Never Can Say Goodbye"	2:56
3.5	1.8	1.11	1.15	"Sugar Daddy"	2:34
3.6		1.12	1.13	"Maybe Tomorrow"	4:46
4.1	3.5	2.02	2.05	"Get It Together"	2:47
4.2(*)	4.1(*)	2.03(*)	2.09	"Dancing Machine"	2:39*/3:24
4.3	4.2	2.04	2.10	"Whatever You Got, I Want"	2:55
4.4	4.3	2.13		"We're Almost There" (MJ)	3:41
4.5	4.6	2.14		"Just a Little Bit of You" (MJ)	3:14
4.6		2.06	2.13	"All I Do Is Think of You"	3:11
5.1	2.1	2.10		"Rockin' Robin" (MJ)	2:30
5.2	2.3	2.11		"I Wanna Be Where You Are" (MJ)	2:59
5.3	2.6	2.12		"Ben" (MJ)	2:42
5.4	2.7	2.15		"That's How Love Goes" (JJ)	3:25
5.5		2.16		"Love Don't Want to Leave" (JaJ)	3:05
5.6	3.1	2.17	2.04 (L)	"Daddy's Home" (JJ)	3:07/5:27*
6.1	2.5	1.13	1.20	"Lookin' Through the Windows"	3:44
6.2	2.2	1.14	1.19	"Little Bitty Pretty One"	2:48
6.3		1.16	2.01	"Corner of the Sky"	3:30
6.4	3.4	1.17		"Skywriter"	3:10
6.5	3.2	1.18	2.03	"Hallelujah Day"	2:43
6.6	3.6	1.19		"The Boogie Man"	2:58
	2.4			"Ain't No Sunshine" (MJ)	4:14
	2.8		1.18	"Doctor My Eyes"	3:13
	3.3			"Morning Glow" (MJ)	3:39
	3.7			"Music and Me" (MJ)	2:43
	3.8		2.11	"The Life of the Party"	2:33
		1.08	1.02	"Who's Lovin' You"	3:59
		1.15		"Teenage Symphony"	2:55
		2.01		"I Hear a Symphony"	3:01
		2.05		"I Was Made to Love Her"	3:20
		2.18		"Let's Get Serious" (JJ)	3:34
		2.19		"You're Supposed to Keep Your Love for Me" (JJ)	3:41
		2.20		"Let Me Tickle Your Fancy" (JJ)	3:51
			1.04	"The Young Folks"	2:54
			1.07	"I'll Bet You"	3:16
			1.11	"Darling Dear"	2:37
			1.14	"It's Great to Be Here"	3:11
			1.16	"I'm So Happy" (Recorded October 1971)	2:46
			1.17	"Medley: Sing a Simple Song/Can You Remember (Live from Hollywood Palace)"	2:07
			1.21	"Love Song" (Recorded March 1972)	3:26
			2.02	"Touch"	3:00
			2.06	"Hum Along and Dance"	8:36
			2.07	"Mama, I Got A Brand New Thing (Don't Say No)"	7:11
			2.08	"It's Too Late to Change the Time"	3:57
			2.15	"We're Here to Entertain You"	3:02

=== Key ===
- (MJ) - Michael Jackson
- (JJ) - Jermaine Jackson
- (JaJ) - Jackie Jackson
- (L) - Live version
- (*) - Single version

=== Notes ===
- ^{1} - Edited down to 2:55.

== Charts ==
Chart (1976)	Peak position
US Billboard Top LPs & Tape	84

== Certifications ==
Region	Certification	Certified units/sales
United Kingdom (BPI)	Silver	60,000^{‡}
^{‡} Sales+streaming figures based on certification alone.
