= Big Boy (song) =

1967 song by the Jackson 5

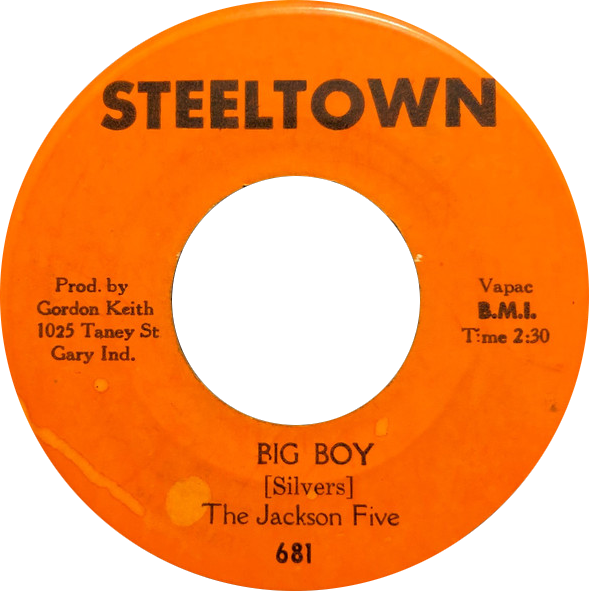
- One of side-A labels of the original 1968 US single

Single by the Jackson 5
- B-side: "You've Changed"
- Released: January 31, 1968
- Recorded: November 1967
- Genre: Soul
- Length: 3:00 (original record); 3:36 (CD release)
- Label: Steeltown
- Songwriter: Ed Silvers
- Producer: Gordon Keith

The Jackson 5 singles chronology
"Big Boy" (1968)	"I Want You Back" (1969)

Audio
- "Big Boy" by the Jackson 5 on YouTube

"Big Boy" (also known as "I'm a Big Boy Now") is the debut single by the American family band the Jackson 5. "Big Boy" was released by Steeltown Records, a record company in Gary, Indiana, in January 1968. After it was released, the song played on radio stations in the Chicago-Gary area and was a local hit. Beginning in March 1968, Steeltown Records sold thousands of copies of "Big Boy" nationally through a distribution deal with Atlantic Records, but it was neither a critical nor commercial success. The Jackson family were delighted with the outcome nonetheless.

The Jackson 5 would release a second single on the Steeltown label, titled "We Don't Have to Be Over 21 (To Fall in Love)", before signing with Motown Records in Detroit, on July 26, 1968. The group played instruments on many of their Steeltown compositions, including "Big Boy". The group's recordings for Steeltown Records were thought to be lost, but were said to be rediscovered more than 25 years later. These recordings were remastered and released in 1995, with "Big Boy" as the promotional lead single. The song was used in the 2026 Michael Jackson biopic Michael.

== Steeltown Records ==
The Jackson 5 began their career performing at talent contests, which they would often win. During a performance at Beckman Junior High in Gary, Indiana, the group were brought to the attention of Gordon Keith — a singer, record producer, and a founder-owner of Steeltown Records, a small record company located in Gary. Keith, Steeltown Records president and secretary in 1967, signed the Jackson Five to six-month contract with him (each Steeltown Records co-owner individually discovered, signed, managed, and received any profit for each signed individual or group, using Steeltown Records (Steeltown label) as an umbrella to promote name recognition) in November of that year, producing and releasing "Big Boy" on January 31, 1968.

The band recorded with their instruments and a backing group on the weekends. Michael Jackson sang lead vocals on the majority of the tracks beginning with "Big Boy" in 1967, which took a few hours to record at Sunny Sawyers recording studio in South Chicago. "Big Boy" was written by songwriter Eddie Silvers, a Chicago musician. According to legend, the group were paid three cents for each record sold, which was equally split among the five brothers and their drummer. The group's first single "Big Boy", was backed with the B-side "You've Changed", written by Jesse Reese. This song was later re-recorded for inclusion on their debut album Diana Ross Presents The Jackson 5. "The Jackson Five Plus Johnny" (Johnny Jackson on drums, no relation) would go on to perform "Big Boy" and other songs locally throughout the Gary and South Chicago area before moving to California in 1969.

The Jackson family gathered around a radio to hear the song broadcast for the first time from WWCA-AM 1270 radio in Gary. Michael Jackson—who was 9 years old at the time—said of the experience, "[the family] all laughed and hugged one another. We felt we had arrived." The single "Big Boy" did not appear on any of Billboard's music charts but sold in excess of 10,000 copies.

The Jackson Five would release a second and final single through Steeltown Records—"We Don't Have to Be Over 21 (To Fall in Love)". The two singles were to be supported by an eleven track studio album but it was never released. The group auditioned at Motown in Detroit on July 23, 1968, and signed an initial deal with Motown Records on July 26. However, as the group's Steeltown contract had not yet expired, the new contract could not be fully executed until March 11, 1969. Motown Records tried to get the group out of their Steeltown contract with Keith, and ultimately succeeded with a financial settlement.

== Reissue ==
In 1994, the master tapes to "Big Boy" were thought to be lost (Keith kept his 1967 Jackson Five master tapes of "Big Boy" in a bank vault). Jackson family friend Ben Brown (and former Steeltown co-owner) claimed he found the tapes in his parents' "kitchen pantry". In 1995, Brown reissued the record on the Inverted Records label—a week before Michael Jackson's HIStory album was issued. He also remastered the song, selling it by mail order, along with an instrumental version, in a limited edition package consisting of a compact disc and cassette tape—the package could be purchased at a cost of approximately $30. The reissue of "Big Boy" was promoted with a music video.

In May 2009, Gordon Keith put items from the Steeltown era up for auction, including "a sizable number of mint-condition copies of 'Big Boy'" (#681) in 45 rpm format and 100 copies of "We Don't Have to Be Over 21 (To Fall in Love)". Keith stated, "I could use the money... I got these guys off the ground... I didn't truly get real money for it".

== Recording discovery ==
Onederful! Records

In August 2009, the Leaners' children of former Chicago One-derful! Records owners George and Ernie Leaner, discovered for the first time, a master recording in the One-derful! archives of the Jackson 5 recording "I'm a Big Boy Now" ("Big Boy") dated July 13, 1967. This recording predates Keith's Steeltown 1967 recording of "Big Boy" (in 1967, the Leaner brothers had told Keith that they did not have any Jackson 5 recordings).

== See also ==
- List of record labels
- List of songs recorded by the Jackson 5
