= Gordon Keith =

Gordon Keith may refer to:

- Gordon Keith (radio host) ("The Great Gordo"), radio talk show host
- Gordon Keith (producer), American record producer
