= Joyful Jukebox Music =

Compilation album by the Jackson 5 featuring Michael Jackson
- Released: October 26, 1976
- Recorded: November 1972 – February 1975
- Length: 30:58
- Labels: Motown; M761L
- Producers: Hal Davis and the Corporation

The Jackson 5/The Jacksons chronology
Anthology (1976)	Joyful Jukebox Music (1976)	The Jacksons (1976)

Joyful Jukebox Music is a compilation album by American music group the Jackson 5, released by the Motown label on October 26, 1976, after the band had left the label. This is the third compilation released by the group, after Greatest Hits (1971) and Anthology (1976), yet the first to be entirely composed of previously unreleased material, recorded between 1972 and 1975. The compilation was released four days after the Jacksons' debut single on their new label Epic Records and less than two weeks before the group's debut album on Epic.

== History ==
In 1975, the Jackson 5 announced that they were leaving Motown and signing to Epic Records. Before their departure from Motown, they were recording dozens of songs per album. Motown gathered some material that had been recorded between 1972 and 1975, for recording sessions and albums: Skywriter, G.I.T.: Get It Together, Dancing Machine and Moving Violation. Those years were very prolific for the Jackson brothers, since in addition to the aforementioned two albums and tracks, Jermaine Jackson, Michael Jackson, and Jackie Jackson each had a solo album at that time (respectively Come into My Life, Music & Me, Jackie Jackson and Forever, Michael).

The albums Joyful Jukebox Music and Boogie were distributed for a very short period, and the album is one of the rarest albums of the Jackson 5, though not as scarce as Boogie. In 2004, it was available for a limited time from Hip-O Select, to complement Motown's 2001 "2 Albums on 1 CD" re-issue set of the Jackson 5's albums, on which some of these songs were issued as bonus tracks. Although only 5,000 copies were pressed, the album contains the previously unreleased full 15+ minute take of the song "Hum Along and Dance."

== Track listing ==
Side One

1. "Joyful Jukebox Music" (Tom Bee, Michael Edward Campbell) - 3:15
2. "Window Shopping" (Clay Drayton, Tamy Smith, Pam Sawyer) - 2:47
3. "You're My Best Friend, My Love" (Sam Brown III, Christine Yarian) - 3:24
4. "Love is The Thing You Need" (Fonce Mizell, Larry Mizell) - 3:05
5. "The Eternal Light" (Mel Larson, Jerry Marcellino) - 3:13

Side Two

1. "Pride and Joy" (Norman Whitfield, Marvin Gaye, William Stevenson) - 3:13 (Marvin Gaye cover)
2. "Through Thick and Thin" (Mel Larson, Jerry Marcellino) - 2:42
3. "We're Here to Entertain You" (Hal Davis, Nita Garfield, Charlotte O'Hara) - 3:02
4. "Make Tonight All Mine" (Freddie Perren, Christine Yarian) - 3:19
5. "We're Gonna Change Our Style" (Clay Drayton, Judy Cheeks) - 2:46

== Production ==
- Cal "RE 20" Harris - mixing engineer
- Jack Andrews - mastering engineer
- Suzee Wendy Ikeda - album direction
- Frank Mulvey - art direction
- Finn Costello - photography
- Gribbitt - graphics
