= Gordon Keith (producer) =

American record producer (1939–2020)

Gordon Keith (aka William Henry Adams Jr.) (August 12, 1939 – November 17, 2020) was an American record producer who was the first person to sign a recording contract with the Jackson 5 and release their records. In 1966, he and four friends founded Steeltown Records in Gary, Indiana, with each able to manage, record, and sign local talent themselves in and around Gary. (Note: Keith put the company together.) The quality of the music and dance scene was high in and near Gary. Vivian Carter, founder of VeeJay Records, and the Spaniels, a prominent doo-wop group, are examples of Gary's musical culture. Keith states that each Steeltown partner individually discovered, signed, and took the responsibility and any profit for each signed individual or group, using Steeltown Records (Steeltown label) as an umbrella to promote name recognition. (Note: Keith was the first president, and the secretary of Steeltown Records.) Keith also points out that he had himself went solo as a vocalist in the 1960s because he wearied of the lack of discipline and commitment of so many of the young singers he sang doo-wop songs with. Therefore, he was looking not only for talent, but talent with a disciplined professional attitude and commitment.

== Resumé ==
Keith recorded and produced four Jackson 5 tracks on the Steeltown label in 1967. Most notable, was the Jackson 5's first single "Big Boy", sung by Michael Jackson. Keith signed the Jackson Five to a six-month management and recording contract with him on November 21 that year, at a time when, oddly, not one of the numerous labels in the region would take them on. After he released "Big Boy" on January 31, 1968, it played on the radio and sold regionally in the Chicago-Gary area. The Jackson 5 recorded "Big Boy" at Sunny Sawyer's recording studio on West 69th Street, on the South Side of Chicago, which was the home of the vibrant Chicago Soul sound of the time, and had many fine session musicians, songwriters, and production studios. The quality and potential heard in the "Big Boy" recording were such that Jerry Wexler of Atlantic Records sought out Keith and made a contract with him on March 5, to have ATCO, a division of Atlantic Records, distribute "Big Boy" nationally. Atlantic Records/Atco in New York City pressed and distributed several thousand copies of "Big Boy" with the Steeltown label and Atco record sleeve. Many of these are still in existence, as are the preceding versions distributed in Gary. The Rock and Roll Hall of Fame and Museum owns a copy of one of the original "Big Boy"/"You Changed" records (Steeltown #681), and this was on display there in 2010.

== Discovers Jackson 5 ==
Keith kept seeing placards around Gary advertising performances by a young group called the Jackson Five Plus Johnny (Johnny Jackson on drums who was not related to the five). He was intrigued by what the frequency and regularity of these signs implied about the high level of their commitment to their music.

Keith wanted to meet and talk with the Jackson 5 and their father Joe Jackson. He was able to get the Jackson family phone number in Gary from local musicians the Sherl Brothers who, like the Jackson 5, were taking lessons from Shirley Cartman, a local music teacher. He called Joe Jackson, and was invited over to the Jackson home on 2300 Jackson Street (named after President Andrew Jackson) to see the boys perform. As Keith recalls: "They set up right in the living room. The furniture was pushed back. They and their equipment took up pretty much the whole room. The whole family was there; Janet was a babe in arms. They were getting ready and there was a thick chord stretched between two of the amps Michael was near. It came up to his chest. From right where he was standing, without a running start, he jumped straight up from a flat-footed position right over this chord to clear it. He had all my attention from there on. I knew I was looking at a boy who was superhuman. When they sang, Michael sang like an angel. Jermaine also had a great voice. Jackie could carry a tune. Marlon could really dance. But when Michael danced, all while singing, he blew away James Brown, Jackie Wilson, Fred Astaire, and anyone else you can name. They sang some James Brown, 'Cold Sweat', Jackie Wilson, "Doggin' Around", some Smokey Robinson, the Temptations, 'My Girl' and 'Just My Imagination'. Well, I was flabbergasted. Knocked out. Blown away. Speechless."

=== Signs Jackson 5 ===
Michael Jackson was just nine years old when Keith signed the Jackson Five to a management and recording contract in 1967. He had done what no one else had managed to do, although every record company in the area was aware of them. Although Keith had a recording studio in the basement of his home in Gary, he took them to the Sunny Sawyer's studio in Chicago (formerly the Morrison Sound Studio) because of its sound and his wanting to use harmonizing vocalists and musicians of the caliber more plentiful there. The masterpiece of these recording sessions is Big Boy, written by Chicago musician and songwriter Eddie Silvers. "Big Boy" received substantial radio play in the Chicago-Northwest Indiana area after it was initially broadcast from WWCA-AM 1270 radio in Gary, and it was the first time Michael Jackson and his brothers heard themselves on the radio. In a two-part TV movie miniseries about the Jackson family (The Jacksons: An American Dream) produced by Motown and shown in 1992 on ABC, the first Jackson 5 song was incorrectly identified as "Kansas City" (released in 1959), which was actually recorded later. "Big Boy" featured a prominent lead by Michael, poignant lyrics in light of his life course, formidable vocal harmonies and, as Michael Jackson said, "a killer bass line". It showcased the more soulful sound of Michael's early style, very different from the more nasal, pop sound of Motown.

To accomplish all this, Keith needed to obtain releases from others who were trying to work with the Jacksons at the time. Powerful, now legendary, disc jockeys E. Rodney Jones and Pervis Spann of Chicago's fabled black AM radio station WVON, told Keith they had spent $40,000 on the Jacksons and still could not get them a record deal. There were dozens of record labels in Chicago at the time, and Motown also returned tapes sent to them by Joe Jackson, without comment. The disc jockeys told Keith to take them if he thought he could get anywhere. Keith then spoke to the Leaner Brothers who owned a prominent local record label named One-derful! (1962–1969). George and Ernie Leaner also released the Jacksons to Keith. Silvers was the music director for One-derful! Records at the time. Keith's relating of this story to a local journalist led to the August 2009 discovery by the Leaners’ children of a master recording in the One-derful! archives of the Jackson Five recording "I'm A Big Boy Now" ("Big Boy") on July 13, 1967. This recording predating Keith's Steeltown recording of "Big Boy" (the Leaner brothers had told Keith, that they did not have any Jackson Five recordings). It may be worth noting, that a young singing group of siblings, the Five Stairsteps, were contemporaries of the Jacksons and were then being produced in Chicago by the late Curtis Mayfield. They ultimately had only one major hit, but may have been part of the reason the Jackson 5 group could not get signed in Chicago, just as Berry Gordy, the owner of Motown, did not yet want the trouble of working with minors which he was experiencing with Stevie Wonder over in Detroit.

In May 2009, Keith had put items from the Steeltown era that he kept in a vault up for auction, including "a sizable number of mint-condition copies of "Big Boy" in 45 rpm format and 100 copies of "We Don't Have To Be Over 21 (to Fall in Love)". Keith stated, "I could use the money ... I got these guys off the ground ... I didn't truly get real money for it".

== Death ==
Gordon Keith died on November 17, 2020.

== Other singers and groups ==
Keith also managed and produced for the following:

- Maxine Crayton – "Don't Take Your Love" / "You Better Stop": Steeltown (#670, 1967)
- Ripples & Waves Plus Michael – "Let Me Carry Your Schoolbooks" / "I Never Had A Girl": Steeltown (#688, 1971)

== Songs and records by Gordon Keith ==
Keith was a vocalist, his own songs on '45' records:

- "A Teenagers Answer": Tower Records (Promotional #383)
- Why Do't You Write (Lee Bates) / "Look Ahead" (Keith): Dragon Records
- "I'll Try To Please You" / "This Is How I Feel": One-Derful! Records (#4844, January 14, 1963)
- "Sweet And Kind" / "Don't Listen to the Grapevine": Steeltown (#686, 1968)
- "Look Ahead" / "Where Do I Go From Here": Calumet Records (#682, 1975)
- "I'll Try To Please You": Steel Town Records (#688, A/B)
- "Tell the Story" / "Don't Take Kindness For Weakness": Steeltown Records (1981)

== See also ==
- List of record labels
- List of songs recorded by the Jackson 5
