= The Jackson 5 in Japan =

Live album by the Jackson 5
- Released: October 31, 1973 (Japan only); October 31, 2004 (5,000 copy limited re-issue)
- Recorded: April 30, 1973
- Venues: Kōsei Nenkin Hall, Osaka, Japan
- Genres: Soul, pop
- Length: 45:38 (LP edition); 48:56 (CD edition)
- Label: Motown

The Jackson 5 chronology
G.I.T.: Get It Together (1973)	The Jackson 5 in Japan (1973)	Dancing Machine (1974)

Professional ratings
Review scores
Source	Rating
AllMusic	3.5/5 stars

The Jackson 5 in Japan, also known as In Japan!, is the first live album released by the Jackson 5, culled from a live concert held in Osaka, Japan at the Kōsei Nenkin Hall (now known as the Orix Theater) on April 30, 1973. It was initially released in Japan on October 31, 1973, and was later released in the United Kingdom in 1988 as Michael Jackson with the Jackson 5 Live. Motown did not release the album in the United States until a limited-edition version was released in 2004, via specialty reissue label Hip-O Select. A quadrophonic mix was released in Japan in 1975, marking an early release of the band's material in surround sound. The album sold over a million copies worldwide.

By 1973, the Jackson 5 were bigger worldwide than they were in America, selling millions of records and giving performances at sold-out concerts. This set features the group performing many of their hit records, as well as three solo hits from Michael Jackson and two from Jermaine Jackson. Michael's voice was changing, struggling to hit the higher notes to songs that he once could sing the years prior. Either the key of the song was changed so Michael would not strain, or he just avoided the higher notes. Early stages of Michael's vocal change can be heard on the second disc of the band's Live at the Forum album (2010), which was recorded on August 26, 1972 (three days before Michael's 14th birthday).

== Track listing ==
Side A

1. "Introduction"/"We're Gonna Have a Good Time" (originally by Rare Earth) (Gilbert Bridges, Raymond Curtis Monette, Mark John Olson, Pete Rivera, Edward Guzman, Tom Baird) 3:39
2. "Lookin' Through the Windows" (Clifton Davis) 3:52
3. "Got to Be There" (Elliot Willensky) 3:44
4. "Daddy's Home" (originally by The Shep and the Limelites) (William Miller, James Sheppard) 5:23
5. "Superstition" (originally by Stevie Wonder) (Stevie Wonder) 3:17
6. "Ben" (Don Black, Walter Scharf) 2:54

Side B

1. "Papa Was a Rollin' Stone" (originally by the Temptations) (Norman Whitfield, Barrett Strong) 3:59
2. "That's How Love Goes" (Wade Brown Jr., Johnny Bristol, David Jones Jr.) 4:46
3. "Never Can Say Goodbye" (Clifton Davis) 2:21
4. "Ain't That Peculiar" (originally by Marvin Gaye) (Warren "Pete" Moore, William Robinson, Bobby Rogers) (also recorded by Jermaine in 1972) 5:28
5. "I Wanna Be Where You Are" (Arthur "T-Boy" Ross, Leon Ware) 6:30

On CD editions, the medley of "I Want You Back"/"ABC"/"The Love You Save" was inserted between "Got to Be There" and "Daddy's Home".
