= Destiny (The Jacksons album) =

Studio album by the Jacksons
- Released: November 1978
- Studios: Total Experience, Heiders/Filmways, and Cherokee (Hollywood, Los Angeles); Record Plant (Los Angeles); Dawnbreakers (San Fernando, California)
- Genres: Progressive soul; pop-soul; disco
- Length: 40:44
- Labels: Epic; CBS
- Producers: Bobby Colomby (exec.); Mike Atkinson (exec.); The Jacksons

The Jacksons chronology
Goin' Places (1977)	Destiny (1978)	Boogie (1979)

Singles from Destiny
- 1. "Blame It on the Boogie" Released: September 8, 1978; 2. "Destiny" Released: December 29, 1978; 3. "Shake Your Body (Down to the Ground)" Released: January 18, 1979

Destiny is the thirteenth studio album released by American band the Jacksons. It was released in November 1978 by Epic Records and CBS Records. The album marked the first time in the band's career in which they had complete artistic control, producing it themselves after previously working under the supervision of Philadelphia soul architects Gamble and Huff.

Including the international hits "Blame It on the Boogie" and "Shake Your Body (Down to the Ground)", the album would eventually sell over four million copies worldwide, two million in America during its initial run and another two million worldwide. It was promoted with a year-long world tour.

== History ==
=== Overview ===
The band had left their longtime label Motown in 1975 (except for brother Jermaine Jackson who had stayed with Motown after he married Berry Gordy's daughter, Hazel Gordy), and after a few years of being with Philly International, the Jacksons set their sights on one of Columbia Records' most popular labels, Epic. After having their previous albums spearheaded by legendary producers Kenny Gamble and Leon Huff, Epic allowed the Jackson brothers to write and produce their own material for the first time in their career, something that Motown did not permit. Composing much of the album in their home-made recording studio in their gated Hayvenhurst mansion, the group finished recording the album within two months.

This album was the first album to include primarily songs written by the Jacksons themselves. Every song was credited to the Jacksons as a band or individually to Michael and Randy, with the exception of the lead single, "Blame It on the Boogie". That song was co-written (coincidentally) by British singer-songwriter Mick Jackson, who was not related to the members of the Jacksons.

Like many of the acts that had left Motown, the Jacksons had to accept the possibility that they would no longer enjoy the same level of success they had while they were associated with the label—something Motown themselves reiterated upon hearing that longtime front man Michael Jackson had moved on to a full-fledged solo career following Destiny's release.

=== Release and reaction ===
Released in November 1978, Destiny re-established them as a top-selling group. The single, "Blame It on the Boogie", was released on September 8, 1978, as the advance single from the album. Although "Blame It on the Boogie" returned the Jacksons to the Hot 100 it was not the single to effect a major comeback for the Jacksons peaking at No. 54. However, "Blame It on the Boogie" did reach No. 3 R&B and would be coupled with "Shake Your Body (Down to the Ground)" on an extended club play single which would reach No. 20 on the dance charts in 1979. "Blame It on the Boogie" rose to number 8 in the UK.

The album's success was largely based on the second single released from the album, "Shake Your Body (Down to the Ground)", which became a Top 10 single in the spring of 1979. The album eventually peaked at number eleven on the Billboard Pop Albums chart and number three on the Billboard Black Albums chart and went on to Platinum status-cementing it as the first RIAA-certified platinum seller by the Jacksons as most of their Motown recordings were uncertifiable despite their huge success on the charts, and over four million copies worldwide. The accompanying tour was a huge success running on many legs and also toured overseas.

=== Album cover ===
The album's artwork, painted by Gary Meyer, has Jackie, Tito, Michael, Randy, and Marlon on top of the word "DESTINY" (the album's title) carved in stone during a thunderstorm containing a whirlwind and stormy waters splashing against the "DESTINY" monolith. A peacock is shown on the back cover fanning his tail and has a message provided by Michael and Jackie for Peacock Productions: "Through the ages, the peacock has been honored and praised for its attractive, illustrious beauty. Of all the bird family, the peacock is the only bird that integrates all colors into one, and displays this radiance of fire only when in love. We, like the peacock, try to integrate all races into one through the love of music."

== Re-release ==
In honor of its 30th anniversary, Destiny, including two bonus tracks of rare 12-inch disco mixes previously unavailable on CD, was released on January 27, 2009, on Epic/Legacy, a division of Sony Music Entertainment. Both unreleased tracks were mixed by John Luongo. It was re-released again in digital format on February 12, 2021 in a release including The Jacksons and Goin' Places.

== Critical reception ==
Professional ratings
Review scores
Source	Rating
AllMusic	4/5 stars
Christgau's Record Guide	B+
The Rolling Stone Album Guide	3/5 stars
Uncut	4/5 stars
New York Daily News	(favourable)
American Songwriter	4/5 stars

Destiny received generally positive reviews. AllMusic stated, "The brothers' third post-Motown album as the Jacksons was their most successful release, both commercially and creatively, since 1974's Dancing Machine. Their first two Epic albums, where they aligned with Gamble, Huff, and other Philly soul stalwarts, had some strong singles but were very uneven and somewhat awkward in stretches, and this time out, they wrote and produced on their own".

== Commercial performance ==
The album was certified gold on March 13, 1979 and platinum on May 8, 1979.

== Track listing ==
Side A
No.	Title	Writer(s)	Length
1.	"Blame It on the Boogie"	Mick Jackson; David Jackson; Elmar Krohn	3:36
2.	"Push Me Away"	The Jacksons	4:19
3.	"Things I Do for You"	The Jacksons	4:05
4.	"Shake Your Body (Down to the Ground)"	Michael Jackson; Randy Jackson	8:00

Side B
No.	Title	Writer(s)	Length
5.	"Destiny"	The Jacksons	4:55
6.	"Bless His Soul"	The Jacksons	4:57
7.	"All Night Dancin'"	Michael Jackson; Randy Jackson	6:11
8.	"That's What You Get (For Being Polite)"	Michael Jackson; Randy Jackson	4:57

2009 re-edition bonus tracks
No.	Title	Length
9.	"Blame It on the Boogie" (John Luongo disco mix)	6:59
10.	"Shake Your Body (Down to the Ground)" (John Luongo disco mix)	8:38

2021 re-edition bonus tracks
No.	Title	Length
9.	"Shake Your Body (Down to the Ground)" (7" version)	3:48
10.	"Destiny" (7" version)	3:47
11.	"Blame It on the Boogie" (John Luongo disco mix)	6:59
12.	"Shake Your Body (Down to the Ground)" (John Luongo disco mix)	8:38
13.	"That's What You Get (For Being Polite)" (12" version)	2:33
14.	"That's What You Get (For Being Polite)" (DJ Reverend P edit)	8:58

== Personnel ==
=== The Jacksons ===
- Michael Jackson – lead vocals, vocal arrangements
- Jackie Jackson – lead vocals (track 6), backing vocals, vocal arrangements
- Marlon Jackson – backing vocals, vocal arrangements
- Tito Jackson – guitars, backing vocals, vocal arrangements
- Randy Jackson – congas (3, 5–8), vocal arrangements, percussion (3), backing vocals

=== Additional musicians ===
- Roland Bautista – guitar (1, 2)
- Paul Jackson, Jr. – guitar (3, 5, 7, 8), guitar solo (6)
- Michael Sembello – guitar (1, 2, 5–8), bass (2)
- Michael Boddicker – synthesizers (4)
- Greg Phillinganes – keyboards, synthesizers (4, 8), rhythm arrangements
- Gary King – bass (1)
- Nathan Watts – bass (1, 3, 5–8)
- Ed Greene – drums (4–8)
- Ricky Lawson – drums (3)
- Rick Marotta – drums (1, 2), percussion (1)
- Paulinho da Costa – percussion (3, 4)
- Laudir de Oliveira – congas (1)
- Claudio Slon – congas (1)
- Seawind Horns – trumpet, saxophone, flute

=== Production ===
- Produced by The Jacksons
- Bobby Colomby, Mike Atkinson – executive producers
- Don Murray, Peter Granet – engineer
- Clare Fischer – string arrangement (2)
- Tom Tom 84 – horn arrangements (3–8), string arrangements (4–6, 8)
- Jerry Hey – horn arrangements (1, 2)

=== Technical ===
- Graphic coordinator: Tony Lane
- Cover artwork by Gary Meyer
- Photography by Jeffrey Scales

== Charts ==
=== Weekly charts ===
Weekly chart performance for Destiny
Chart (1978–1979)	Peak position
Australian Albums (Kent Music Report)	5
Canadian Albums (RPM)	3
Dutch Albums (Album Top 100)	7
French Albums (SNEP)	2
New Zealand Albums (RMNZ)	37
Spanish Albums (AFE)	18
UK Albums (OCC)	33
US Billboard Top LPs & Tape	11
US Soul LPs (Billboard)	3

=== Year-end charts ===
Year-end chart performance for Destiny
Chart (1979)	Position
US Pop LPs (Billboard)	31
US Soul LPs (Billboard)	5

== Certifications ==
Certifications for Destiny
Region	Certification	Certified units/sales
Australia (ARIA)	Platinum	50,000^{^}
Canada (Music Canada)	Gold	50,000^{^}
Netherlands (NVPI)	Gold	50,000^{^}
United States (RIAA)	Platinum	2,000,000
^{^} Shipments figures based on certification alone.
