= Boogie (album) =

Compilation album by the Jackson 5
- Released: January 16, 1979
- Recorded: 1969–1973
- Genre: Bubblegum pop; soul
- Length: 31:04
- Label: Natural Resources; Motown
- Producer: Hal Davis; The Corporation; Bobby Taylor; Mel Larson; Jerry Marcellino

The Jackson 5/The Jacksons chronology
Destiny (1978)	Boogie (1979)	Triumph (1980)

Boogie is a compilation album of both previously released and unreleased tracks by American band the Jackson 5. It was released by the Motown label on January 16, 1979, after the release of the Jacksons' studio album Destiny (1978) a month earlier. Boogie is considered the rarest of all Jackson 5/Jacksons releases, as not many albums were pressed and fewer were sold at the time.

== Re-release ==
Boogie was available for a limited time from Hip-O Select, to complement Motown's 2001 "2 Albums on 1 CD" re-issue set of the Jackson 5's albums, on which some of these songs were issued as bonus tracks. Although only 5,000 copies were pressed, the album contains the previously unreleased full 15+ minute take of the song "Hum Along and Dance". It was available for purchase on iTunes in 2014, but was since removed. The album was eventually reissued by Music on CD in 2022.

Alternate, shorter versions of "Love's Gone Bad" and "I Was Made to Love Her" were later featured on Michael Jackson's 1986 compilation album, Looking Back to Yesterday.

== Track listing ==
Side A
No.	Title	Writer(s)	Length
1.	"Love's Gone Bad" (Originally by Chris Clark)	Lamont Dozier, Brian Holland, Edward Holland, Jr.	3:19
2.	"I Ain't Gonna Eat Out My Heart Anymore" (Maybe Tomorrow sessions, originally by The Young Rascals)	Laura Burton, Pam Sawyer	3:00
3.	"ABC" (Released on the group's ABC album)	Berry Gordy, Jr., Alphonso Mizell, Freddie Perren, Deke Richards	2:58
4.	"I Was Made to Love Her" (Originally by Stevie Wonder, ABC sessions)	Henry Cosby, Sylvia Moy, Stevie Wonder	4:16
5.	"One Day I'll Marry You" (Third Album sessions)	Pam Sawyer, LaVerne Ware	2:58

Side B
No.	Title	Writer(s)	Length
6.	"Never Can Say Goodbye" (Released on the group's Maybe Tomorrow album)	Clifton Davis	2:57
7.	"Oh, I've Been Bless'd" (Diana Ross Presents The Jackson 5 sessions)	Lena Manns, Frank Wilson	2:50
8.	"Penny Arcade" (Lookin' Through the Windows sessions)	Mel Larson, Jerry Marcellino, Deke Richards	2:41
9.	"Just Because I Love You" (Maybe Tomorrow sessions)	James W. Alexander, Willie Hutch	3:14
10.	"Dancing Machine" (Originally released on the group's Get It Together and Dancing Machine albums, though the version included here is a shorter edit than the one appearing in either album)	Hal Davis, Don Fletcher, Dean Parks	2:36

== Personnel ==
Side A

"Love's Gone Bad"

- Written and composed: Lamont Dozier, Brian Holland, Edward Holland Jr.
- Arrangement: David Blumberg
- Lead vocals: Michael Jackson
- Background vocals: The Jackson 5
- Producer: Hal Davis

"I Ain't Gonna Eat Out My Heart Anymore"

- Written and composed: Laurie Burton and Pam Sawyer
- Arrangement: James Anthony Carmichael
- Lead vocals: Michael Jackson
- Background vocals: The Jackson 5
- Producer: Hal Davis

"ABC"

- Written and composed: The Corporation
- Arrangement: The Corporation
- Lead vocals: Michael Jackson, Jermaine Jackson and Jackie Jackson
- Background vocals: The Jackson 5
- Producer: The Corporation

"I Was Made to Love Her"

- Written and composed: Henry Cosby, Sylvia Moy and Stevie Wonder
- Arrangement: David Blumberg
- Lead vocals: Michael Jackson
- Background vocals: The Jackson 5
- Producer: Hal Davis

"One Day I'll Marry You"

- Written and composed: Pam Sawyer and LaVerne Ware
- Arrangement: Gene Page
- Lead vocals: Michael Jackson
- Background vocals: The Jackson 5
- Producer: Hal Davis

Side B

"Never Can Say Goodbye"

- Written and composed: Clifton Davis
- Arrangement: The Corporation, Gene Page and James Carmichael
- Lead vocals: Michael Jackson
- Background vocals: The Jackson 5
- Producer: Hal Davis

"Oh, I've Been Bless'd"

- Written and composed: Lena Manns and Frank Wilson
- Lead vocals: Michael Jackson
- Background vocals: The Jackson 5
- Producer: Bobby Taylor

"Penny Arcade"

- Written and composed: Mel Larson, Jerry Marcellino and Deke Richards
- Lead vocals: Jermaine Jackson and Michael Jackson
- Background vocals: The Jackson 5
- Producers: Mel Larson and Jerry Marcellino

"Just Because I Love You"

- Written and composed: James W. Alexander and Willie Hutch
- Arrangement: James Carmichael
- Lead vocals: Jermaine Jackson and Michael Jackson
- Background vocals: The Jackson 5
- Producer: Hal Davis

"Dancing Machine"

- Written and composed: Hal Davis, Don Fletcher and Dean Parks
- Arrangement: Arthur Wright
- Bass: William Salter
- Keyboards: Joe Sample
- Drums: James Gadson
- Lead vocals: Michael Jackson and Jermaine Jackson
- Background vocals: The Jackson 5
- Producer: Hal Davis
