= Christmas Album (Jackson 5 album) =

Studio album by the Jackson 5
- Released: October 15, 1970
- Genres: Christmas; R&B
- Length: 34:13
- Label: Motown
- Producers: The Corporation; Hal Davis

The Jackson 5 chronology
Third Album (1970)	Christmas Album (1970)	Maybe Tomorrow (1971)

Alternative cover
- 2009 remaster

Singles from Christmas Album
- 1. "Santa Claus Is Comin' to Town" Released: 1970

Christmas Album is the fourth studio album and first Christmas album by American pop band the Jackson 5. It was released on October 15, 1970 by Motown. The group's version of "Santa Claus Is Coming to Town" was released as a single, and along with their version of "I Saw Mommy Kissing Santa Claus", it regularly receives radio play during the Christmas season. The album spent four weeks at the number one position on Billboard magazine's special Christmas Albums chart that the magazine published in December 1970, making it the best-selling Christmas album of that year and also of the year 1972 in the United States. This album was a top seller and had the potential to chart high on the US Billboard Top LPs ranking, but from 1963 to 1973, holiday albums were not allowed to chart in it. The album has been praised by music critics and has since sold over 3 million copies worldwide.

In the US, the album was released on CD in 1986. In 2003, Universal Motown re-released the album as part of their 20th Century Masters - The Christmas Collection series. This version of the album was remastered and included the Michael Jackson solo song "Little Christmas Tree" as a bonus track (from the various artists compilation A Motown Christmas, originally released in 1973). In 2009, an expanded version of the album was released under the title Ultimate Christmas Collection. This version includes remixes, spoken word Christmas greetings from each member of the Jackson 5, and a medley of the songs from the original version of the album.

== Release ==
The release of Christmas Album in October 1970 marked the end of a successful year for the band. Three albums were released by the group, with ABC in May and Third Album in September, with a tour running from May to December. The group recreated a similar feat the following year, with Maybe Tomorrow hitting record stores in April, the Goin' Back to Indiana soundtrack in September, and a greatest hits collection in December, with a tour which ran from January to August. In addition, Michael Jackson's solo debut single "Got to Be There", also hit the music stands in October, with the complete album of the same name coming out in January 1972.

== Reception ==
Professional ratings
Review scores
Source	Rating
AllMusic	4.5/5 stars
The Rolling Stone Album Guide	3/5 stars

Christmas Album has been hailed by many as one of the best holiday albums. AllMusic's Lindsay Planer rated Christmas Album four and a half out of five stars. She stated that "they carefully crafted and significantly modernized familiar seasonal selections." She also praised all of the tracks. Joshua Alston of The A.V. Club also praised the album and said "the original songs are among its finest moments". He also said "Christmas is tough to compete with because it isn't—as Christmas records so often are—an inessential brand extension or bait for discography completists. It's a potent distillation of the spirit of Christmas, an album joyful enough to make me feel like it's the most wonderful time of the year rather than merely telling me so." Rolling Stone also praised the album, calling it a "gem".

== Track listing ==
Side one
No.	Title	Writer(s)	Length
1.	"Have Yourself a Merry Little Christmas"	Ralph Blane, Hugh Martin	5:19
2.	"Santa Claus Is Comin' to Town"	J. Fred Coots, Haven Gillespie	2:24
3.	"The Christmas Song"	Robert Wells, Mel Tormé	2:45
4.	"Up on the House Top"	Benjamin Hanby; arranged and adapted by the Corporation	3:16
5.	"Frosty the Snowman"	Steve Nelson, Jack Rollins	2:39

Side two
No.	Title	Writer(s)	Length
6.	"The Little Drummer Boy"	K.K. Davis, Henry Onorati, Harry Simeone	3:15
7.	"Rudolph the Red-Nosed Reindeer"	Johnny Marks	2:32
8.	"Christmas Won't Be the Same This Year"	Pam Sawyer, LaVerne Ware	2:31
9.	"Give Love on Christmas Day"	Berry Gordy Jr., Fonce Mizell, Freddie Perren, Deke Richards	2:44
10.	"Someday at Christmas"	Ron Miller, Bryan Wells	2:44
11.	"I Saw Mommy Kissing Santa Claus"	Tommie Connor	3:01

2003 remaster
No.	Title	Writer(s)	Length
12.	"Little Christmas Tree"	George Clinton, Artie Wayne	3:37

2009 Ultimate Christmas Collection bonus tracks
No.	Title	Writer(s)	Length
12.	"Season's Greetings from Michael Jackson (spoken word)"		0:09
13.	"Little Christmas Tree"	Clinton, Wayne	3:37
14.	"Season's Greetings from Tito Jackson (spoken word)"		0:06
15.	"Up on the Housetop" (DJ Spinna Re-Edit)	Hanby, arranged and adapted by the Corporation	5:00
16.	"Season's Greetings from Jackie Jackson (spoken word)"		0:07
17.	"Rudolph the Red-Nosed Reindeer" (Stripped Mix)	Marks	3:04
18.	"Season's Greetings from Jermaine Jackson (spoken word)"		0:07
19.	"Someday at Christmas" (Stripped Mix)	Miller, Wells	2:44
20.	"Give Love on Christmas Day" (Group A Cappella Version)	Gordy Jr., Mizell, Perren, Richards	3:37
21.	"J5 Christmas Medley"		3:51

== Personnel ==
Vocals

- Michael Jackson – Lead vocals (2, 4–6, 9–11), background vocals (1, 3, 7–8)
- Jermaine Jackson – Lead vocals (1, 3, 7–8, 10), background vocals (2, 4–6, 9–11)
- Jackie Jackson – Background vocals
- Tito Jackson – Background vocals, synthesizers (4–5)
- Marlon Jackson – Background vocals

Production

- Hal Davis – producer
- The Corporation – producers
- James Anthony Carmichael, Gene Page – arrangements

Technical

- Adam Abrams – production coordinator
- Harry Weinger – supervisor
- Vartan – art direction
- Alana Coghlan, Katherine Marking – design

== Charts ==
=== Weekly charts ===
Weekly chart performance for Christmas Album
Chart (1970–2026)	Peak position
Canadian Albums (RPM)	45
Danish Albums (Hitlisten)	32
Dutch Albums (Album Top 100)	30
Lithuanian Albums (AGATA)	26
Norwegian Albums (VG-lista)	40
Swedish Albums (Sverigetopplistan)	30
US Billboard 200	28
US Top R&B/Hip-Hop Albums (Billboard)	5

=== Year-end charts ===
Year-end chart performance for Christmas Album
Chart (2022)	Position
US Top R&B/Hip-Hop Albums (Billboard)	100
Chart (2023)	Position
US Top R&B/Hip-Hop Albums (Billboard)	89
Chart (2024)	Position
US Top R&B/Hip-Hop Albums (Billboard)	83
Chart (2025)	Position
US Top R&B/Hip-Hop Albums (Billboard)	90

== Certifications and sales ==
Certifications for Christmas Album
Region	Certification	Certified units/sales
Denmark (IFPI Danmark)	Gold	10,000^{‡}
New Zealand (RMNZ)	Platinum	15,000^{^}
Summaries
Worldwide	—	3,500,000
^{‡} Sales+streaming figures based on certification alone.
