= Steeltown Records =

American record company

- Founded: 1966; 60 years ago
- Founder: Gordon Keith
- Defunct: 1972; 54 years ago
- Genre: Various
- Country of origin: United States
- Location: Gary, Indiana, U.S.

Steeltown Records was an American record company in Gary, Indiana. The company was founded in 1966 by William Adams (a.k.a. Gordon Keith; deceased) and co-owned with Ben Brown (deceased), Maurice Rodgers, Willie Spencer (deceased), and Lou "Ludie" D. Washington (deceased). (Note: Keith put the company together and was the first president, and the secretary of Steeltown Records.) The record company was mostly active from 1966 to 1972. Steeltown gave the Jackson 5 their start in the music industry. The Jackson 5's first record was released on the Steeltown label in early 1968, before Motown signed the group in 1969.

Two Jackson 5 singles were recorded for Steeltown at a South Chicago recording studio in 1967, "Big Boy"/"You Changed" and "We Don't Have to Be Over 21 (to Fall in Love)"/"Jam Session". (Note: Keith recorded the songs at Sunny Sawyer's Recording Studio.) "Big Boy", Michael Jackson's first song, was released on January 31, 1968, by Gordon Keith, who was the manager and producer of the Jackson 5 and their songs. (Note: Steeltown owners individually discovered, signed, recorded, and took the responsibility and any profit for each signed individual or group using the Steeltown label as an umbrella to promote name recognition.) "Big Boy" was played on Chicago-Gary area radio stations and became a local hit. (Note: "Big Boy" (written in Chicago by Eddie Silvers) was first broadcast from WWCA-AM 1270 radio in Gary.) The following March, Keith signed a contract with Atlantic Records to manufacture and distribute the "Big Boy"/"You Changed" record nationally. Atco Records, a division of Atlantic Records in New York City, distributed several thousand Steeltown copies with the "Atlantic-Atco" record sleeve. Many of these vinyl records (45 rpm) are still in existence, as are some of the first "Big Boy" singles distributed in Gary by Steeltown. The Rock and Roll Hall of Fame and Museum owns one of the original Steeltown "Big Boy"/"You Changed" records (#681), and this single was on display there in 2010.

The Jacksons moved to Los Angeles, California in 1969. After Ben Brown moved there in 1985, he partnered with Joe Jackson, the patriarch of the Jackson family, and became the president of Jackson Records.

== See also ==
- List of record labels
- List of songs recorded by the Jackson 5
