= Live at the Forum (The Jackson 5 album) =

Live album by the Jackson 5
- Released: June 21, 2010
- Recorded: June 20, 1970 and August 26, 1972
- Venue: The Forum (Inglewood, California)
- Genre: R&B; soul; pop
- Length: 127:50
- Label: Motown; Hip-O Select

The Jackson 5 chronology
| J Is for Jackson 5 (2010) | Live at the Forum (2010) | Come and Get It: The Rare Pearls (2012) |

Professional ratings
Review scores
| Source | Rating |
|---|---|
| AllMusic | 4/5 stars |

Live at the Forum is a live album by American family musical group the Jackson 5. It was released on June 21, 2010. The live tracks contained in the album were mostly recorded on June 20, 1970 and August 26, 1972, during concerts at The Forum, in Inglewood, California.

The 1970 concert was a record-breaking show of nearly 19,000 attending, with the group only having released two studio albums and a couple of singles out up to that point. This concert is an example of the group's very early part of their career, on their first tour.

By the second show in 1972, the Jackson 5 were established icons and had seven albums on the Motown label, not including Michael or Jermaine's solo albums, which play a considerable part in the 1972 setlist. Michael's voice shows early signs of changing (as this concert was three days before his 14th birthday); he's still singing in a high-pitched voice but throughout most of this set he's straining to do so, at times screeching to hit the notes he could easily sing the years prior. Some songs were transposed to a lower key and Michael sang alternate phrasings to prevent his voice from cracking.

== Track listing ==
Disc one (1970)

1. "Introduction" – 0:41
2. "I Want You Back" (The Corporation) – 3:08
3. "Feelin' Alright" (Dave Mason) – 4:51
4. "Who's Lovin' You" (William "Smokey" Robinson Jr.) – 4:56
5. "Walk On" (Suzanne de Passe, Jackson 5) – 2:21
6. "Don't Know Why I Love You" (Don Hunter, Stevie Wonder, Lula Hardaway, Paul Riser) 3:40
7. "Zip-a-Dee-Doo-Dah" (Ray Gilbert, Allie Wrubel) – 2:55
8. "ABC" (The Corporation) – 3:33
9. "Intro / It's Your Thing" (Rudolph Isley, O'Kelly Isley, Ronald Isley) – 4:55
10. "I Found That Girl" (The Corporation) – 4:45
11. "There Was a Time" (James Brown) – 3:14
12. "Intro / Thank You Falettinme Be Mice Elf Agin" (Sylvester Stewart) – 7:08
13. "The Love You Save" (The Corporation) – 3:32
14. "Mama's Pearl" (Bonus Track) (The Corporation) – 3:10

Disc two (1972)

1. "Brand New Thing" (Jackson 5) – 3:01
2. "Medley: I Want You Back / ABC / Mama's Pearl"^ (The Corporation) – 4:51
3. "Sugar Daddy" (The Corporation) – 2:57
4. "I'll Be There" (Berry Gordy, Bob West, Hal Davis, Willie Hutch) – 4:04
5. "Introduction by Michael" – 1:56
6. "Goin' Back to Indiana / Brand New Thing / Goin' Back to Indiana" (The Corporation, The Jackson 5) – 3:55
7. "Bridge Over Troubled Water" (Paul Simon) – 2:21
8. "I Found That Girl" (The Corporation) – 3:41
9. "I'm So Happy" (The Corporation) – 2:59
10. "Lookin' Through the Windows" (Clifton Davis) – 3:53
11. "Ain't Nothing Like the Real Thing" (Nickolas Ashford, Valerie Simpson) – 2:35
12. "Introduction by Jackie" – 0:22
13. "Ben" (Don Black, Walter Scharf) – 2:39
14. "Rockin' Robin" (Jimmie Thomas) – 2:30
15. "Got to Be There" (Elliot Willensky) – 2:11
16. "You've Got a Friend" (Carole King) – 2:21
17. "Ain't No Sunshine" (Bill Withers) – 5:29
18. "I Wanna Be Where You Are" (Arthur "T-Boy" Ross, Leon Ware) – 3:42
19. "Introduction by Jermaine" – 1:09
20. "That's How Love Goes" (David H. Jones Jr., John Bristol, Wade Brown Jr.) – 3:16
21. "Never Can Say Goodbye" (Clifton Davis) – 4:43
22. "Walk On" (Suzanne de Passe, The Jackson 5) – 2:22
23. "The Love You Save" (The Corporation) – 3:48
24. "Intro / I Wanna Be Where You Are" (Bonus Track) (Arthur "T-Boy" Ross, Leon Ware) – 4:14

Notes:

^Previously issued, in part, on the soundtrack to The Jacksons: An American Dream in 1992.
^^Originally released on the soundtrack to Save the Children.

- The band's usual opening song, "Stand!", was excluded from the release because the boys were having technical difficulties during the start of the 1970 show. Jermaine’s vocal microphone was off and his bass amplifier was inaudible, so the show had to be stopped for several minutes while the sound crew fixed everything.
- "Mama's Pearl" in disc one was taken from the group's concert in Indiana on May 29, 1971. It is one of the five unreleased songs from that concert.
- "Ain't No Sunshine" was recorded the night after most of the second disc was recorded, at the San Diego International Sports Arena, August 27, 1972. It was edited into Michael's solo set in the album's track listing, whereas in the San Diego show, it was elsewhere in the setlist.
