= Come and Get It: The Rare Pearls =

Come And Get It: The Rare Pearls

Compilation album by The Jackson 5
- Released: August 28, 2012
- Recorded: 1969–1974
- Genre: Pop; bubblegum pop; soul; R&B
- Length: 1:42:06
- Label: Motown

The Jackson 5 chronology
Live at the Forum (2010)	Come And Get It: The Rare Pearls (2012)

Come And Get It: The Rare Pearls is a compilation album of previously unreleased tracks by American family group The Jackson 5, which was released digitally on August 28, 2012 and physically on September 18, 2012.

== Background ==
This compilation contains unreleased songs, recorded by the group during their tenure on the Motown Records label. Some of them are cover versions (Randy Newman's "Mama Told Me Not to Come", Traffic's "Feelin' Alright" and labelmates The Supremes' "You Can't Hurry Love"), and some of the tracks are alternate versions of already released songs (a longer version of "That's How Love Is" and the demo version of "Mama's Pearl" which was known as "Guess Who's Making Whoopie With Your Girlfriend").

== Marketing ==
In November 2009, Motown Records released I Want You Back! Unreleased Masters, a selection of unreleased tracks by the Jackson 5. It coincided with the 40th anniversary of their debut single on the label ("I Want You Back" b/w "Who's Lovin' You"), and closely followed the release of the documentary–concert film Michael Jackson's This Is It. The physical version of this compilation was released on September 18, 2012, the same day as Michael Jackson's Bad 25.

== Track listing ==
Disc 1
No.	Title	Writer(s)	Length
1.	"(We're the) Music Makers"	Arthur Ross, Doug Gibbs	1:00
2.	"If the Shoe Don't Fit"	Berry Gordy, Alphonso Mizell, Freddie Perren, Deke Richards	3:18
3.	"Come and Get It (Love's on the Fire)"	Deke Richards, Freddie Perren, Alphonso Mizell	3:12
4.	"I Got a Sure Thing"	William Bell, Booker T. Jones	3:21
5.	"After You Leave Girl"	Bobby Taylor	2:38
6.	"Mama Told Me Not to Come"	Randy Newman	3:04
7.	"Iddinit"	The Corporation	3:47
8.	"Since I Lost My Baby"	William Robinson, Warren Moore	2:52
9.	"Keep an Eye"	Nickolas Ashford, Valerie Simpson	3:08
10.	"Movin'"	Jackie DeShannon, Jimmy Holiday, Randy Myers	3:23
11.	"Feelin' Alright" (studio version)	Dave Mason	3:13
12.	"You Better Watch Out"	Bonnie LeGrande, Lorraine Durham	3:06
13.	"I'm Your Sunny One (He's My Sunny Boy)"	Robinson	2:49
14.	"Someone's Standing In My Love Light"	Kathy Wakefield, Annette Tucker	2:52

Disc 2
No.	Title	Writer(s)	Length
1.	"If You Want Heaven"	Wakefield, Tucker	3:07
2.	"You Can't Hurry Love"	Brian Holland, Lamont Dozier, Edward Holland Jr.	2:50
3.	"Keep Off the Grass"	Richards	3:08
4.	"Going My Way"	Donald Daniels, Theresa McFaddin, Richard Hutch	3:57
5.	"Makin' Life a Little Easier for You"	Richards, Perren, Mizell, Berry Gordy	3:18
6.	"Up on the Roof"	Gerry Goffin, Carole King	3:07
7.	"If I Can't Nobody Can"	Perren, Christine Yarian	2:45
8.	"Our Love"	Richards	3:25
9.	"I Can't Get Enough of You"	Eddie Horan	2:48
10.	"Cupid"	Clay Drayton, Tamy Smith	2:54
11.	"Let's Go Back to Day One"	Patrice Holloway, Gloria Jones	3:02
12.	"Would Ya Would Ya Baby"	Perren	3:57
13.	"Love Trip"	Jack Perricone, Doug McClure	3:07
14.	"Label Me Love"	Clay McMurray, John Glover, James Dean	3:31
15.	"Jumbo Sam"	Mel Larson, Joe Marcellino, Don Fenceton	3:05
16.	"That's How Love Is" (Original Complete Version)	Richards, Perren, Mizell	3:25
17.	"If I Have to Move a Mountain" (Original Complete Version)	Richards, Perren, Mizell, Gordy	4:47
18.	"Mama's Pearl" (Demo)	Richards, Perren, Mizell, Gordy	4:10

== Cover versions ==
- "I Got a Sure Thing" was originally recorded by William Bell for his 1969 album Bound to Happen.
- "Mama Told Me Not to Come" was originally recorded by Eric Burdon & The Animals for their 1967 album Eric Is Here, and more famously known as a 1970 single by Three Dog Night.
- "Since I Lost My Baby" was originally a 1965 single by The Temptations.
- "Keep an Eye" and "I'm Your Sunny One (He's My Sunny Boy)" were originally recorded by The Supremes for their 1968 album Love Child.
- "Movin'" was originally recorded by Jackie DeShannon for her 1969 album Put a Little Love in Your Heart.
- "Feelin' Alright" was originally a 1968 single by Traffic.
- "You Can't Hurry Love" was originally a 1966 single by The Supremes.
- "Up on the Roof" was originally a 1962 single by The Drifters.
- "Let's Go Back to Day One" was originally recorded by Eddie Kendricks for his 1971 album All by Myself.
- "Label Me Love" was originally a 1972 single by Different Shades Of Brown, whose background vocals were used on this cover recording.
