= Skywriter =

Studio album by the Jackson 5
- Released: March 29, 1973
- Recorded: April 1972 – January 1973
- Length: 29:25
- Label: Motown
- Producer: Hal Davis; The Corporation

The Jackson 5 chronology
Lookin' Through the Windows (1972)	Skywriter (1973)	G.I.T.: Get It Together (1973)

Singles from Skywriter
- 1. "Corner of the Sky" Released: October 2, 1972; 2. "Hallelujah Day" Released: February 26, 1973; 3. "Skywriter" Released: August 22, 1973

Professional ratings
Review scores
Source	Rating
AllMusic	2/5 stars
Rolling Stone	(mixed)

Skywriter is the seventh studio album by The Jackson 5, released by Motown on March 29, 1973. Skywriter has sold an estimated 2.8 million copies worldwide since its release.

== Background ==
Lead singer Michael Jackson continued to develop into a tenor, while Jermaine Jackson's vocal timbre deepened over time. A notable example from the Skywriter album is the track "Touch," originally recorded by The Supremes in 1971, which features both Michael and Jermaine addressing themes of intimate relationships. Given that Michael was only 14 years old at the time, "Touch" emerged as one of the most controversial singles he had performed until the resurgence of his solo career in the late 1970s.

The Jackson Five experienced growing dissatisfaction with their musical direction, expressing their discontent to Motown's producers and songwriters regarding the genre and style of music being offered. The brothers' frustration was compounded by their inability to record their own compositions, despite all five siblings actively writing their own material. This discontent was visibly reflected in the album cover of Skywriter, where the brothers are depicted solemnly posed around an early 20th-century airplane. The album, which was the least successful to date for the group, featured only one Top 20 single and was arranged by James Anthony Carmichael, Jerry Marcellino, Mel Larson, Freddie Perren, Gene Page, Fonce Mizell, and The Corporation.

"The Boogie Man"/Don't Let Your Baby Catch You was prepared for release as a single, but was cancelled.

== Track listing ==
Side one

1. "Skywriter" (Mel Larson, Jerry Marcellino) – 3:08
2. "Hallelujah Day" (Freddie Perren, Christine Yarian) – 2:46
3. "The Boogie Man" (Deke Richards) – 2:56
4. "Touch" (originally performed by the Supremes) (Pam Sawyer, Frank Wilson) – 3:00
5. "Corner of the Sky" (from the Broadway musical Pippin) (recorded 1972) (Stephen Schwartz) – 3:33

Side two

1. "I Can't Quit Your Love" (originally performed by the Four Tops) (Leonard Caston, Kathy Wakefield) – 3:12
2. "Uppermost" (Clifton Davis) – 2:26
3. "World of Sunshine" (Mel Larson, Jerry Marcellino) – 2:45
4. "Ooh, I'd Love to Be with You" (Fonce Mizell, Larry Mizell) – 2:49
5. "You Made Me What I Am" (The Corporation) – 2:50

=== Re-release ===
In 2001, Motown Records remastered all Jackson 5 albums in a "Two Classic Albums/One CD" series (much like they did in the late 1980s). This album was paired up with Get It Together. The bonus tracks were the outtakes "Pride and Joy", "Love's Gone Bad" and "Love Is the Thing You Need". Each of these tracks also appear on the compilation album Joyful Jukebox Music/Boogie.

== Charts ==
Chart (1973)	Peak position
Australian Albums (Kent Music Report)	41
Canadian Albums (RPM)	60
US Billboard Top LPs & Tape	44
US Billboard Top Soul Albums	15
