= Diana Ross Presents The Jackson 5 =

1969 studio album by the Jackson 5

Studio album by the Jackson 5
- Released: December 12, 1969
- Recorded: May–August 1969
- Studio: The Sound Factory (West Hollywood, California)
- Genres: Pop; soul; R&B
- Length: 36:17
- Label: Motown
- Producers: Bobby Taylor; The Corporation

The Jackson 5 chronology
Diana Ross Presents The Jackson 5 (1969)	ABC (1970)

Singles from Diana Ross Presents The Jackson 5
- 1. "I Want You Back" / "Who's Lovin' You" Released: October 7, 1969

Diana Ross Presents The Jackson 5 is the debut studio album by the American pop band the Jackson 5. It was released on December 12, 1969 by Motown. The Jackson 5's lead singer, a preadolescent Michael Jackson and his four older brothers Jackie, Tito, Jermaine, and Marlon, became pop successes within months of this album's release. Diana Ross Presents The Jackson 5's only single, "I Want You Back", became a number-one hit on the US Billboard Hot 100 within weeks of the album's release. The album reached number 5 on the US Pop Albums chart, and spent nine weeks at No. 1 on the US R&B/Black Albums charts. To date, the Jackson 5's debut album has sold estimated 5 million copies worldwide.

The album title suggested that Motown star Diana Ross had discovered the group, as do the Ross-penned liner notes on the back cover. Ross' supposed discovery of the Jackson 5 was in fact part of Motown's marketing and promotions plan for the Jackson 5. In actuality, it had been Motown producer Bobby Taylor who had discovered them. Joe Jackson, the father and manager of the Jackson 5, thanked the "lovely Gladys Knight, (who) extended a helping hand to our family, by calling Motown executives and talking their ear off to take time out of their schedule and meet with us. She believed in us before others. Always grateful to her." Knight also said she brought the Jackson 5 to Motown's attention. Regardless, Ross embraced her assigned role and helped promote the group.

== Critical reception ==
Professional ratings
Review scores
Source	Rating
AllMusic	4/5 stars
Rolling Stone	3/5 stars

Diana Ross Presents The Jackson 5 received widespread critical acclaim. AllMusic stated, "Less than two weeks before the 1960s were left to be deciphered in the history books, Motown unleashed Diana Ross Presents the Jackson 5 (1969) and in doing so fittingly marked the beginning of a new era in crossover pop and soul. For all intents and purposes, this dozen-song disc introduced the world to the sibling talents of Jackie, Tito, Jermaine, Marlon, and most significantly of all, a prepubescent powerhouse named Michael Jackson. The brothers' inextricably tight vocal harmonies were fueled by the ebullience of youth and inexperience while the flames of their collective success were stoked with the funkified vibe of urban America."

== Track listing ==
All songs produced by Bobby Taylor except for "Nobody" and "I Want You Back", produced by the Corporation.

Side A
No.	Title	Writer(s)	Singers	Length
1.	"Zip-a-Dee-Doo-Dah" (recorded May 1969)	Ray Gilbert, Allie Wrubel	Michael Jackson, Tito Jackson	3:18
2.	"Nobody" (recorded August 1969)	The Corporation	Michael Jackson, Jermaine Jackson	2:54
3.	"I Want You Back" (recorded August 1969)	The Corporation	Michael Jackson, Jermaine Jackson, Jackie Jackson, Tito Jackson, Marlon Jackson	3:04
4.	"Can You Remember" (recorded July 10 & 15, 1969)	Thom Bell, William Hart	Michael Jackson, Jermaine Jackson	3:10
5.	"Standing in the Shadows of Love" (recorded June 1969)	Holland–Dozier–Holland	Michael Jackson, Jermaine Jackson, Tito Jackson	4:06
6.	"You've Changed" (recorded July 19 & 29, 1969)	Jesse Reese	Michael Jackson	3:16

Side B
No.	Title	Writer(s)	Singers	Length
7.	"My Cherie Amour" (recorded July 1969)	Stevie Wonder, Sylvia Moy, Hank Cosby	Jermaine Jackson	3:44
8.	"Who's Lovin' You" (recorded July 19, 24 & 29, 1969)	Smokey Robinson	Michael Jackson	4:06
9.	"Chained" (recorded August 1969)	Frank Wilson	Michael Jackson, Jermaine Jackson	2:54
10.	"(I Know) I'm Losing You" (recorded July 1969)	Cornelius Grant, Norman Whitfield, Eddie Holland	Jermaine Jackson	2:16
11.	"Stand!" (recorded May 17, 1969)	Sylvester Stewart	Michael Jackson, Marlon Jackson, Jermaine Jackson	2:30
12.	"Born to Love You" (recorded June 1969)	Ivy Jo Hunter, William "Mickey" Stevenson	Michael Jackson, Jermaine Jackson	2:38

- Although "Reach Out, I'll Be There" was originally considered for inclusion on the album and appears on the back of early pressings, it was replaced by "Born to Love You". It was released in 1995 on the box set Soulsation!

=== Recording sessions ===
The songs on the album were recorded during May–August 1969.

Other tracks taken from its sessions include:

- "Listen I'll Tell You How"
- "Oh, I've Been Bless'd"
- "To Sir, with Love"
- "I'm Your Sunny One"
- "After You Leave Girl"
- "You've Really Got a Hold on Me"
- "It's Your Thing"
- "Since I Lost My Baby"
- "What's So Good About Goodbye"

=== Re-release ===
In 2001, Motown remastered all Jackson 5 albums in a "Two Classic Albums/One CD" series, as they had previously done in the late 1980s. Diana Ross Presents The Jackson 5 was paired up with ABC. One bonus track was included in a cover of Bobby Taylor's "Oh, I've Been Bless'd", a song also released on the rare 1979 outtakes album Boogie.

== Personnel ==
Vocals

- Michael Jackson – lead vocals (1–6, 8–9, 11–12), backing vocals (7, 10)
- Jermaine Jackson – lead vocals (2–3, 5, 7, 9–12), backing vocals (1, 4, 6, 8)
- Jackie Jackson – lead vocals (3), backing vocals
- Tito Jackson – lead vocals (1, 3, 5), backing vocals (2–4, 6–12)
- Marlon Jackson – lead vocals (3, 11), backing vocals (1–10, 12)

Technical

- David Blumberg, David Van DePitte, Paul Riser, The Corporation – arrangements
- Curtis McNair – artwork direction
- Ken Kim – artwork, design
- Jim Hendin – cover photography
- Hisao "Hy" Fujita - artwork,illustration,typeset

== Charts ==
=== Weekly charts ===
Chart (1969–1970)	Peak position
Australian Albums (Kent Music Report)	17
Canadian Albums (RPM)	10
UK Albums (OCC)	16
US Billboard 200	5
US Best Selling Soul LP's	1

=== Year-end charts ===
Chart (1970)	Position
US Billboard Pop Albums	40
US Billboard Top Soul Albums	7

== Sales ==
Region	Certification	Certified units/sales
United States	—	1,600,000^{^}
Summaries
Worldwide	—	5,000,000
^{*} Sales figures based on certification alone.^{^} Shipments figures based on certification alone.

== See also ==
- List of number-one R&B albums of 1970 (U.S.)
