= Pride and Joy (Marvin Gaye song) =

"Pride & Joy"

Single by Marvin Gaye

from the album That Stubborn Kinda Fellow
- B-side: "One of Those Days"
- Released: April 18, 1963
- Recorded: September 12, 1962; Hitsville, USA; Detroit, Michigan
- Genre: Rhythm and blues, soul
- Length: 2:05 (single version); 2:36 (album version)
- Label: Tamla T-54079
- Songwriters: Norman Whitfield; Marvin Gaye; William "Mickey" Stevenson
- Producer: William "Mickey" Stevenson

Marvin Gaye singles chronology
"Hitch Hike" (1962)	"Pride & Joy" (1963)	"Can I Get a Witness" (1963)

"Pride and Joy" is a 1963 single by Marvin Gaye, released on the Tamla label. The single, co-written by William "Mickey" Stevenson, Gaye and Norman Whitfield, and produced by Stevenson, was considered to be a tribute to Gaye's then-girlfriend, Anna Gordy. The album version of the single featured on Gaye's second album, That Stubborn Kinda Fellow is different in parts to the single version presenting a more jazz effect than the gospel-emulated version that became a single. The song was also Gaye's first top ten pop single peaking at number ten on the chart and just missed the top spot of the R&B singles chart peaking at number two. The song also helped continue Gaye's successful hit streak as the singer would score another Top 40 pop hit at the end of that year with "Can I Get a Witness".

== Background ==
The song was also the third straight (and last) single to include Martha and the Vandellas in background vocals, just weeks before "Heat Wave" made the girl group one of the high-tier Motown acts.

When the Beatles first arrived in New York City in 1964, they requested Murray the K play the song on his radio station.

== Track list ==
A. "Pride and Joy" – 2:07
B. "One of These Days" – 2:49

== Personnel ==
- Lead vocals by Marvin Gaye
- Background vocals by Martha and the Vandellas: Martha Reeves, Rosalind Ashford and Annette Beard
- Instrumentation by the Funk Brothers

== Chart performance ==
Chart (1963)	Peak position
US Billboard Hot 100	10
US Billboard Hot R&B Singles	2

== Cover versions ==
- The Jackson 5 recorded the song for the G.I.T.: Get It Together album in 1973, but it was not released until 1976 on their compilation album Joyful Jukebox Music
