= Lookin' Through the Windows =

Studio album by the Jackson 5
- Released: May 17, 1972
- Recorded: February 1970 (Track 3); October 1971–April 1972
- Genres: Bubblegum; soul
- Length: 33:04
- Label: Motown
- Producers: The Corporation; Hal Davis; Johnny Bristol; Willie Hutch; Jerry Marcellino; Mel Larson

The Jackson 5 chronology
| Greatest Hits (1971) | Lookin' Through the Windows (1972) | Skywriter (1973) |

Singles from Lookin' Through the Windows
- 1. "Little Bitty Pretty One" Released: April 4, 1972; 2. "Lookin' Through the Windows" Released: June 23, 1972; 3. "Doctor, My Eyes" Released: February 2, 1973

Professional ratings
Review scores
| Source | Rating |
|---|---|
| AllMusic | 3.5/5 stars |
| Christgau's Record Guide | B |

Lookin' Through the Windows is the sixth studio album by the Jackson 5, released on the Motown label in May 1972. It has sold 3.5 million copies worldwide.

== Production ==
Lookin' Through the Windows marks the beginning of lead singer Michael's vocal change, from the boy soprano who fronted the Jackson 5's early hits, to the tenor who would later become a successful solo artist. Though he could still reach his famed high notes, his voice was filling out, allowing him to also reach lower registers.

Most of the album tracks were recorded in late 1971 and intended to be on an album for their hit single at the time, "Sugar Daddy". Lookin' Through the Windows was the penultimate Jackson 5 album to include any songs written by the Corporation (Berry Gordy, Freddie Perren, Deke Richards and Fonce Mizell). The album spawned two hit singles "Little Bitty Pretty One" and "Lookin' Through The Windows". The album peaked at No. 7 on Billboard 200 album chart. In Europe the album cut "Doctor, My Eyes" was a Top 10 hit. Two months after the album was released, Jermaine had his first solo album.

The album was arranged by James Anthony Carmichael, John Bahler, the Corporation, Eddie Munson, H.B. Barnum, Arthur G. Wright and Gene Page.

== Personnel ==
Motown Records chose to not disclose the studio musicians who played on most Jackson 5 records until some records in 1974. Based on the known session musicians who played for Motown Records in 1972 it can be assumed that the musicians who played on the album are as follows:

- Bass - Wilton Felder and Ron Brown
- Guitar - Don Peake, Louie Shelton and David T. Walker
- Drums - Gene Pello, James Gadson and Paul Humphrey
- Keyboards/Piano - Joe Sample and Don Randi
- Percussion - Bobbye Hall Porter and Sandra Croutch (Tamborine)

== Track listing ==
Side one
| No. | Title | Writer(s) | Length |
|---|---|---|---|
| 1. | "Ain't Nothing Like the Real Thing" (originally performed by Marvin Gaye and Tammi Terrell) | Nickolas Ashford, Valerie Simpson | 3:46 |
| 2. | "Lookin' Through the Windows" | Clifton Davis | 2:30 |
| 3. | "Don't Let Your Baby Catch You" | The Corporation | 3:11 |
| 4. | "To Know" | The Corporation | 3:22 |
| 5. | "Doctor, My Eyes" (originally performed by Jackson Browne) | Jackson Browne | 3:14 |

Side two
| No. | Title | Writer(s) | Length |
|---|---|---|---|
| 6. | "Little Bitty Pretty One" (originally performed by Bobby Day) | Bobby Day | 2:51 |
| 7. | "E-Ne-Me-Ne-Mi-Ne-Moe" (The Choice is Yours to Pull) | Johnny Bristol, Wade Brown, Jr., David Jones, Jr. | 2:53 |
| 8. | "If I Have to Move a Mountain" | The Corporation | 3:20 |
| 9. | "Don't Want to See Tomorrow" | Stephen Bowden, Jim Chambers, Hal Davis, Theodore McFaddin | 2:46 |
| 10. | "Children of the Light" | Michael Randall | 2:27 |
| 11. | "I Can Only Give You Love" | Richard Hutch, Willie Hutch | 2:33 |

=== Re-release ===
In 2001, Motown Records remastered all the Jacksons' albums in a "Two Classic Albums/One CD" series. This album was paired up with Goin' Back to Indiana. The bonus tracks were "Love Song", the B-side of this album's title track single, and a live performance of "Who's Lovin' You", which first appeared on the soundtrack of the 1992 TV movie The Jacksons: An American Dream.

== Charts ==
| Chart (1972) | Peak position |
|---|---|
| Canadian Albums (RPM) | 47 |
| UK Albums (OCC) | 16 |
| US Billboard Top LPs & Tape | 7 |
| US Billboard Top Soul Albums | 3 |
