= I Want You Back! Unreleased Masters =

Compilation album by the Jackson 5
- Released: November 10, 2009
- Recorded: 1969–1974
- Genre: R&B
- Length: 42:28
- Label: Motown
- Producer: The Corporation; Bobby Taylor; Hal Davis; Willie Hutch; Stevie Wonder; Johnny Bristol

The Jackson 5 chronology
The Motown Years (2008)	I Want You Back! Unreleased Masters (2009)	J Is for Jackson 5 (2010)

Singles from I Want You Back! Unreleased Masters
- 1. "That's How Love Is" Released: October 6, 2009

Professional ratings
Review scores
Source	Rating
AllMusic	3.5/5 stars

I Want You Back! Unreleased Masters is a Jackson 5 compilation released on November 10, 2009 (roughly five months after lead singer Michael Jackson's death) to celebrate the 40th anniversary of the band's debut on Motown Records; their debut single "I Want You Back" was issued October 7, 1969. The compilation, specifically designed to fit like a regular 1970s-era album, contains previously unreleased songs and alternate versions of some of the group's hits.

== Track listing ==
No.	Title	Writer(s)	Producer	Length
1.	"Medley: I Want You Back/ABC/The Love You Save" (Alternate version from The Flip Wilson Show, Oct. 1971)	The Corporation	The Corporation	3:07
2.	"That's How Love Is"	Deke Richards/Freddie Perren/Alphonso Mizell	The Corporation	2:36
3.	"Listen I'll Tell You How"	Bobby Taylor/Nick Moloci	Bobby Taylor (arranged by Gene Page)	3:00
4.	"Man's Temptation"	Curtis Mayfield	Bobby Taylor	5:40
5.	"Never Can Say Goodbye" (Alternate version from The Flip Wilson Show, Oct. 1971)	Clifton Davis	Hal Davis	2:58
6.	"Love Comes in Different Flavors" (Outtake from ABC recording sessions)	Deke Richards/Jerry Marcellino/Mel Larsen	The Corporation	3:16
7.	"ABC" (Demo version)	The Corporation	The Corporation	3:28
8.	"Love Call" (1971-1972)	Willie Hutch/Richard Hutch/Graves Kennedy	Willie Hutch	2:26
9.	"Buttercup" (Demo from 1974, during Dancing Machine recording sessions)	Stevie Wonder	Stevie Wonder	3:54
10.	"Lucky Day"	Don Daniels/Theresa McFaddin	Hal Davis (arranged by Sam Brown)	2:43
11.	"I'll Try You'll Try (Maybe We'll All Get By)" (1972-1973)	David Jones Jr./Wade Brown Jr./Johnny Bristol	Johnny Bristol	4:58
12.	"Dancing Machine" (Alternate version from G.I.T.: Get It Together recording sessions)	Hal Davis/Don Fletcher/Weldon Dean Parks	Hal Davis	4:26
