= The Jacksons (album) =

Studio album by The Jacksons
- Released: November 5, 1976
- Recorded: June–September 1976
- Studio: Sigma Sound (Philadelphia, Pennsylvania); Paragon Studios (Chicago, Illinois)
- Genre: Soul; R&B; funk; Philadelphia soul
- Length: 39:27
- Label: Epic; PIR
- Producer: Kenneth Gamble & Leon Huff; McFadden & Whitehead; Victor Carstarphen; Dexter Wansel; The Jacksons

The Jacksons chronology
Joyful Jukebox Music (1976)	The Jacksons (1976)	Goin' Places (1977)

Singles from The Jacksons
- 1. "Enjoy Yourself" Released: October 22, 1976; 2. "Show You the Way to Go" Released: March 1977; 3. "Dreamer" Released: July 29, 1977

The Jacksons is the eleventh studio album by the Jacksons, the band's first album for Epic Records and under the name "the Jacksons", following their seven-year tenure at Motown as "the Jackson 5". Jackson 5 member Jermaine Jackson stayed with Motown when his brothers broke their contracts and left for Epic, and he was replaced by youngest Jackson brother Randy. The album was released in 1976 for Epic Records and Philadelphia International Records as a joint venture.

== Critical reception ==
Professional ratings
Review scores
Source	Rating
AllMusic	2.5/5 stars
Christgau's Record Guide	C+
Rolling Stone	mixed
The Rolling Stone Album Guide	3.5/5 stars
Uncut	3/5 stars

Philadelphia International heads Kenneth Gamble and Leon Huff produced and executive produced the album, including their first top ten hit in two years, "Enjoy Yourself", but had a difficult time focusing on a sound for the now-grown-up boy band. However, the group was able for the first time to record their own material, something that had been denied to them at Motown. The Jacksons composed "Style of Life" and "Blues Away" on their own. "Blues Away" was the first published song written by lead singer Michael Jackson, who began to take a more percussive vocal approach on this album. The album also spawned a second successful R&B single, "Show You the Way to Go" (UK no. 1). Though never released as a single, "Good Times" became a popular album cut from regular quiet storm airplay.

== Commercial performance ==
The album was the Jacksons' first gold album, despite their having sold more than 10 million albums while at Motown (Motown's sales and financial records were not presented for auditing by the RIAA until 1976).

== Track listing ==
All tracks are written by Kenny Gamble and Leon Huff, except where noted.

Side one
No.	Title	Writer(s)	Lead vocals	Length
1.	"Enjoy Yourself"	Gamble; Huff	Michael and Jackie Jackson	3:24
2.	"Think Happy"		Michael and Jackie Jackson	3:07
3.	"Good Times"		Michael and Jackie Jackson	4:57
4.	"Keep on Dancing"	Dexter Wansel	Michael Jackson	4:31
5.	"Blues Away"	Michael Jackson	Michael Jackson	3:12

Side two
No.	Title	Writer(s)	Lead vocals	Length
6.	"Show You the Way to Go"		Michael Jackson	5:30
7.	"Living Together"	Wansel	Michael and Jackie Jackson	4:26
8.	"Strength of One Man"	Gene McFadden; John Whitehead; Victor Carstarphen	Jackie Jackson; Marlon Jackson; Randy Jackson; Michael Jackson	3:56
9.	"Dreamer"		Michael Jackson	3:05
10.	"Style of Life"	Tito Jackson; Michael Jackson	Michael Jackson	3:19
Total length:				39:27

== Personnel ==
Arrangements

- Bobby Martin, Jack Faith, Dexter Wansel

Producers

- 1–3, 6, 9 – Kenneth Gamble and Leon Huff
- 4, 7 – Dexter Wansel
- 5, 10 – Gamble, Huff, Wansel, the Jacksons, Gene McFadden and John Whitehead
- 8 – McFadden, Whitehead and Victor Carstarphen

Music

- MFSB, Tito Jackson, Randy Jackson

Technical

- Jay Mark, Joe Tarsia – mixing
- Joe Tarsia – recording
- John Berg – album design
- Harou Miyauchi – cover drawings
- Norman Seeff – photography

== Charts ==
Chart performance for The Jacksons
Chart (1976–1977)	Peak position
Canadian Albums (RPM)	4
UK Albums (OCC)	53
US Billboard Top LPs & Tape	36
US Soul LPs (Billboard)	6

== Certifications ==
Certifications for The Jacksons
Region	Certification	Certified units/sales
United States (RIAA)	Gold	500,000^{^}
^{^} Shipments figures based on certification alone.
