= G.I.T.: Get It Together =

Studio album by the Jackson 5
- Released: September 12, 1973
- Recorded: November 1972 – July 1973
- Genres: Progressive soul; funk; disco; R&B
- Length: 36:07
- Label: Motown
- Producer: Hal Davis

The Jackson 5 chronology
Skywriter (1973)	G.I.T.: Get It Together (1973)	The Jackson 5 in Japan (1973)

Singles from G.I.T.: Get It Together
- 1. "Get It Together" Released: August 3, 1973; 2. "Dancing Machine" Released: February 19, 1974

G.I.T.: Get It Together (a.k.a. Get It Together) is the eighth studio album by the Jackson 5, released on September 12, 1973, for the Motown label. The album featured the minor hit "Get It Together" and the original version of the subsequent major hit "Dancing Machine", which was later re-released in edited form on a tie-in album of the same name. Get It Together has sold an estimated two million copies worldwide since its release.

The album represented a reinvention for the Jackson 5, who were struggling to move past their earlier teenybopper image as their popularity waned. By this point, most of the Jackson 5's members and their manager/father, Joseph, were vocally complaining about the group's direction, with lead singer Michael becoming the most outspoken. The material on G.I.T., produced by Hal Davis, leans into a funk-oriented progressive soul style, contrasting with the group's bubblegum origins, as well as elements of the emergent disco genre.

== Notability ==
G.I.T.: Get It Together was the first album to feature lead singer Michael's noticeable growth spurt, now with a slightly deeper, full-fledged tenor singing voice, as he was 14 when the album was recorded and 15 when it came out. The overall group's sound changed as well. It was also on this album that he first employed what became known as his "vocal hiccup", notably on the song "It's Too Late to Change the Time". As Motown frowned on any relinquishment of control to the group, Michael semi-retired the hiccup until his solo career began in earnest at Epic Records with Off the Wall in 1979.

Get It Together was one of the earliest albums to experiment with a disco sound, released before the genre was mainstream. The album was a breakaway from the group's bubblegum soul sound as they came up with a more funk-oriented album similar to the Temptations' Norman Whitfield-produced albums. Two of Whitfield's Temptations songs — "You Need Love Like I Do (Don't You)" and "Hum Along and Dance"— appeared on Get It Together. Whitfield's group, the Undisputed Truth, also recorded the original version of "Mama, I Got A Brand New Thing (Don't Say No)", which appears here in a 7-minute-long version with all of the Jacksons singing.

The sequence of songs was also carefully arranged for Get It Together. There was no silence separating one song from the other. Each track flowed together thematically, a technique borrowed from Stevie Wonder's landmark album Music of My Mind, released the year before.

The title track, "Get It Together", was a modest pop hit for the group, reaching No. 28, while the album-closing "Dancing Machine" became a smash pop hit, reaching No. 2 on the pop chart and briefly restoring the Jackson 5 to their former success.

Get It Together was also the first Jackson 5 album to feature all five Jackson brothers sharing lead vocals, giving it a more unified group aura. Marlon, in particular, is prominently featured on "Mama, I Got A Brand New Thing," and Jackie and Tito lead the brothers through "Hum Along and Dance". Jackie released a solo album a month later. In addition, the album did not feature production or songwriting from any of the now-disbanded Corporation. Motown head Berry Gordy, a member of the Corporation, was busy expanding his Motown empire into movie ventures.

The album was arranged by Arthur G. Wright, David Blumberg, and James Anthony Carmichael.

In November 1969, Motown Records released a similarly titled album, G.I.T. on Broadway, by Diana Ross and the Supremes and The Temptations.

== Reception ==
Professional ratings
Review scores
Source	Rating
AllMusic	2.5/5 stars
Rolling Stone	(favorable)

Rolling Stone's Vince Aletti stated that "it's their most energetic and exciting work since 'ABC,' and an album that should finally break them out of the just-kids market once and for all."

== Track listing ==
Lead vocals are as noted in superscripts: (a) Michael Jackson, (b) Jermaine Jackson, (c) Jackie Jackson, (d) Tito Jackson, (e) Marlon Jackson.

Side One

1. "Get It Together" (Hal Davis, Donald Fletcher, Berry Gordy, Mel Larson, Jerry Marcellino) ^{a, b} – 2:48
2. "Don't Say Goodbye Again" (Pam Sawyer, Leon Ware) ^{a} – 3:24
3. "Reflections" (originally by Diana Ross & the Supremes) (Lamont Dozier, Edward Holland, Jr., Brian Holland) ^{a, b} – 2:58
4. "Hum Along and Dance" (originally by the Temptations) (Barrett Strong, Norman Whitfield) ^{a, b, c, d, e} – 8:37

Side Two

1. "Mama, I Got A Brand New Thing (Don't Say No)" (originally by the Undisputed Truth) (Norman Whitfield) ^{a, b, c, d, e} – 7:11
2. "It's Too Late to Change the Time" (Pam Sawyer, Leon Ware) ^{a} – 3:57
3. "You Need Love Like I Do (Don't You)" (originally by Gladys Knight & the Pips) (Barrett Strong, Norman Whitfield) ^{a, b} – 3:45
4. "Dancing Machine" (Hal Davis, Donald Fletcher, Dean Parks) ^{a, b} – 3:27

=== Re-release ===
In 2001, Motown Records remastered all J5 albums in a "Two Classic Albums/One CD" series (much like they did in the late 1980s). This album was paired up with Skywriter. The bonus tracks were the outtakes "Pride and Joy", "Love's Gone Bad," and "Love Is the Thing You Need". "Love Is the Thing You Need" and "Pride and Joy" were released on Joyful Jukebox Music in 1976, and "Love's Gone Bad" was released on Boogie in 1979.

== Charts ==
Chart (1973)	Peak position
US Billboard Top LPs & Tape	100
US Billboard Top Soul Albums	4
