= Goin' Back to Indiana =

Soundtrack album by the Jackson 5
- Released: September 29, 1971
- Recorded: May 29 and September 16, 1971
- Length: 42:29
- Label: Motown
- Producer: Berry Gordy (exec.); The Corporation

The Jackson 5 chronology
| Maybe Tomorrow (1971) | Goin' Back to Indiana (1971) | Greatest Hits (1971) |

Professional ratings
Review scores
| Source | Rating |
|---|---|
| AllMusic | 4/5 stars |
| The Encyclopedia of Popular Music | 2/5 stars |
| (The New) Rolling Stone Album Guide | 2/5 stars |

Goin' Back to Indiana is a live/soundtrack album by the Jackson 5 for Motown, taken from their September 16, 1971 ABC TV special of the same name. It is the Jackson 5's sixth album overall, and was released on September 29, 1971. The album went on to sell over 2.6 million copies worldwide.

The Goin' Back to Indiana television special featured comedians Bill Cosby and Tommy Smothers, singers Bobby Darin and Diana Ross, football players Roosevelt "Rosey" Grier and Ben Davidson, and basketball stars Bill Russell, Elgin Baylor, and Elvin Hayes. It also featured tracks recorded by the Jackson 5 during their May 29 "homecoming" concert at the Coliseum in Indianapolis, hence the show title.

== Track listing ==
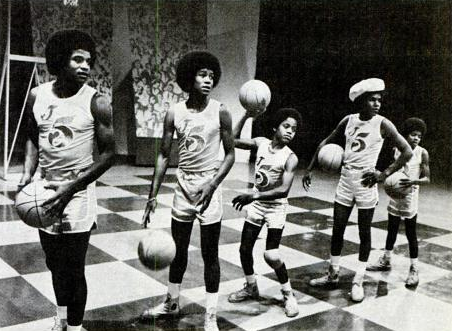
Jackson 5 during their filming of Goin' Back to Indiana

1. "I Want You Back" (The Corporation) – 4:14
2. "Maybe Tomorrow" (The Corporation) – 4:15
3. "The Day Basketball Was Saved" (Bill Angelos, Buz Kohan, Dick DeBenedictis) – 7:59
4. "Stand!" (Sylvester Stewart) – 4:15
5. "I Want to Take You Higher" (Sylvester Stewart) – 2:13
6. "Feelin' Alright" (originally by Traffic) (Dave Mason) – 4:12
7. Medley: "Walk On" (this version originally by Isaac Hayes) / "The Love You Save" (The Corporation) – 4:57
8. "Goin' Back to Indiana" (The Corporation) – 4:47

In 1974, Goin' Back to Indiana was reissued by Pickwick Records as Stand. This reissue was a partial version of the full album. The same year, Pickwick also reissued the full soundtrack as Jackson 5.

In 2001, Motown remastered all Jackson 5 albums in a "Two Classic Albums/One CD" series (much like they did in the late 1980s). This album was paired with Lookin' Through the Windows (1972). The bonus tracks were "Love Song" and a live performance of "Who's Lovin' You", which first appeared on the soundtrack of the 1992 TV movie The Jacksons: An American Dream.

== Full setlist ==
The TV special and soundtrack consists of multiple in-studio live performances, skits and half of the Jackson 5's concert in Indiana on May 29, 1971. The other half of the live show was omitted, and some songs were also edited upon the release. Over the years, a couple of tracks from the concert have been released (such as "Who's Lovin' You" and "Mama's Pearl"), but there has not been any official release of their full show from that evening. The setlist was as follows:

1. "Stand!" (Sylvester Stewart)
2. "I Want to Take You Higher" (Sylvester Stewart)
3. "I Want You Back" (The Corporation)
4. "ABC" (The Corporation)
5. "Feelin' Alright" (Dave Mason)
6. "Who's Lovin' You" (William "Smokey" Robinson Jr.)
7. "Mama's Pearl" (The Corporation)
8. "I Found That Girl" (The Corporation)
9. "Never Can Say Goodbye" (Clifton Davis)
10. "Walk On" (Suzanne de Passe, The Jackson 5)
11. "The Love You Save" (The Corporation)
12. "Goin' Back to Indiana" (The Corporation)

== Charts ==
=== Weekly charts ===
| Chart (1971) | Peak position |
|---|---|
| Canadian Albums (RPM) | 24 |
| US Billboard Top LPs | 16 |
| US Billboard Top Soul Albums | 5 |
