= Third Album =

Studio album by the Jackson 5
- Released: September 8, 1970
- Recorded: April–July 1970
- Genres: Bubblegum; rock and roll; soul
- Length: 37:23
- Label: Motown
- Producers: The Corporation; Hal Davis

The Jackson 5 chronology
ABC (1970)	Third Album (1970)	Christmas Album (1970)

Singles from Third Album
- 1. "I'll Be There" Released: August 28, 1970; 2. "Mama's Pearl" Released: January 7, 1971; 3. "Goin' Back to Indiana" Released: February 1971 (international release)

Third Album is the third studio album by American pop band the Jackson 5, released on September 8, 1970 by Motown. It was produced by The Corporation and Hal Davis.

Third Album featured the group's fourth consecutive No. 1 single on the US pop charts, "I'll Be There", the Top 5 single "Mama's Pearl", and album tracks such as the semi-autobiographical "Goin' Back to Indiana" and "Darling Dear". The album peaked at No. 4 on the Billboard Top LPs chart and No. 1 on both the US R&B Albums chart and on Cashbox. The release is considered one of the group's best efforts. It sold over 6 million copies worldwide.

== Critical reception ==
Professional ratings
Review scores
Source	Rating
AllMusic	4/5 stars
Christgau's Record Guide	B−

AllMusic’s Lindsay Planer rated Third Album four out of five stars. She stated that the album contains "the unmistakable Motown sound, expanding just enough to incorporate other significant influences as well." She also stated that a few of the tracks "are [...] worthwhile spins."

== Track listing ==
Side one
No.	Title	Writer(s)	Lead vocals	Length
1.	"I'll Be There"	Berry Gordy Jr.; Bob West; Hal Davis; Willie Hutch	Michael Jackson and Jermaine Jackson	3:59
2.	"Ready or Not Here I Come (Can't Hide from Love)" (The Delfonics cover)	Thom Bell; William Hart	Michael Jackson	2:34
3.	"Oh How Happy" (The Shades of Blue cover)	Edwin Starr	Jermaine Jackson	2:16
4.	"Bridge Over Troubled Water" (Simon & Garfunkel cover)	Paul Simon	Jermaine Jackson	5:52
5.	"Can I See You in the Morning"	Deke Richards	Michael Jackson	3:09

Side two
No.	Title	Writer(s)	Lead vocals	Length
6.	"Goin' Back to Indiana"	The Corporation	Michael Jackson (spoken vocals by each member)	3:32
7.	"How Funky Is Your Chicken"	Lester Lee Carr; Richard Hutch; W. Hutch	Michael Jackson, Jermaine Jackson, and Jackie Jackson	2:41
8.	"Mama's Pearl"	The Corporation	Michael Jackson	3:09
9.	"Reach In"	Beatrice Verdi	Jermaine Jackson and Michael Jackson	3:28
10.	"The Love I Saw in You Was Just a Mirage" (the Miracles cover)	Smokey Robinson; Marv Tarplin	Michael Jackson	4:22
11.	"Darling Dear" (The Miracles cover)	George Horgay Gordy; Robert Gordy; Allen Story	Michael Jackson	2:40
Total length:				37:23

=== Re-release ===
In 2001, Motown remastered all Jackson 5 albums in a "Two Classic Albums/One CD" series (much like they did in the late 1980s). This album was paired up with Maybe Tomorrow. The bonus tracks were "Sugar Daddy", the only new track on their 1971 greatest hits set, and "I'm So Happy", the B-side of that single.

== Charts ==
Chart (1970)	Peak position
Canadian Albums (RPM)	9
US Top LPs (Billboard)	4
US Best Selling Soul LP's	1

== Certifications ==
Certifications for Third Album
Region	Certification	Certified units/sales
United States (RIAA)	Gold	1,000,000
Summaries
Worldwide	—	6,000,000

== See also ==
- List of number-one R&B albums of 1970 (U.S.)
