= Maybe Tomorrow (The Jackson 5 album) =

Studio album by the Jackson 5
- Released: April 12, 1971
- Genres: Pop; Soul; R&B
- Length: 33:59
- Label: Motown
- Producers: The Corporation; Hal Davis

The Jackson 5 chronology
Christmas Album (1970)	Maybe Tomorrow (1971)	Goin' Back to Indiana (1971)

Singles from Maybe Tomorrow
- 1. "Never Can Say Goodbye" Released: March 16, 1971; 2. "Maybe Tomorrow" Released: June 22, 1971

Professional ratings
Review scores
Source	Rating
AllMusic	3.5/5 stars
Christgau's Record Guide	C+
Rolling Stone	(mixed)

Maybe Tomorrow is the fifth studio album by the Jackson 5, released on April 12, 1971 by Motown. Released after the success of the hit ballad "I'll Be There", most of the tracks on the album are ballads, with few dance numbers. The album includes the hit singles "Never Can Say Goodbye" and "Maybe Tomorrow". While not as financially successful as the Jackson 5's first three outings, Maybe Tomorrow contains some of the most often-sampled and covered material in the group's catalogue. The album also spent six weeks at No. 1 on the US Soul Albums chart and has sold over 3.5 million copies worldwide.

Maybe Tomorrow was arranged by Gene Page and James Anthony Carmichael.

== Track listing ==
All tracks are written by The Corporation, except where noted. All lead vocals are by Michael Jackson, except where noted.

Side one
No.	Title	Writer(s)	Lead vocals	Length
1.	"Maybe Tomorrow"			4:41
2.	"She's Good"		Jermaine Jackson	2:59
3.	"Never Can Say Goodbye"	Clifton Davis		2:57
4.	"The Wall"	Mel Larson; Jerry Marcellino; Pam Sawyer		3:03
5.	"Petals"			2:34

Side two
No.	Title	Writer(s)	Lead vocals	Length
6.	"Sixteen Candles" (The Crests cover)	Luther Dixon; Allyson R. Khent	Jermaine Jackson	2:45
7.	"(We've Got) Blue Skies"	Thomas Bee; Chris Clark; Fuller Gordy; Patrick Stephenson; Delores Wilkinson		3:21
8.	"My Little Baby"		Michael Jackson and Jermaine Jackson	2:58
9.	"It's Great to Be Here"			2:59
10.	"Honey Chile" (Martha Reeves & the Vandellas cover)	Richard Morris; Sylvia Moy		2:45
11.	"I Will Find a Way"		Jermaine Jackson	2:57
Total length:				33:59

=== Re-release ===
In 2001, Motown remastered all Jackson 5 albums in a "Two Classic Albums/One CD" series (much like they did in the late 1980s). This album was paired with Third Album. The bonus tracks were "Sugar Daddy", the only new track on their 1971 greatest hits set, and "I'm So Happy", the B-side of that single.

== Personnel ==
Recording sessions took place from June 1970 to February 1971. Lead singer Michael Jackson performs "Maybe Tomorrow", "Never Can Say Goodbye", "The Wall", "Petals", "(We've Got) Blue Skies", "My Little Baby", "It's Great to Be Here", and "Honey Chile". His brother Jermaine sang lead on "She's Good", "Sixteen Candles", and "I Will Find A Way".

Vocals

- Michael Jackson – Lead and background vocals
- Jermaine Jackson – Lead and background vocals
- Tito Jackson – Background vocals
- Jackie Jackson – Background vocals
- Marlon Jackson – Background vocals

== Charts ==
=== Weekly charts ===
Chart (1971)	Peak position
Canadian Albums (RPM)	16
US Billboard Top LPs	11
US Billboard Top Soul Albums	1

=== Year-end charts ===
Chart (1971)	Position
US Billboard Top LPs	43
US Billboard Top Soul Albums	6

== Sales ==
Region	Certification	Certified units/sales
United States	—	1,000,000
Summaries
Worldwide	—	4,000,000
^{*} Sales figures based on certification alone.^{^} Shipments figures based on certification alone.

== See also ==
- List of number-one R&B albums of 1971 (U.S.)
