= List of songs recorded by Michael Jackson =

Songs by American singer-songwriter

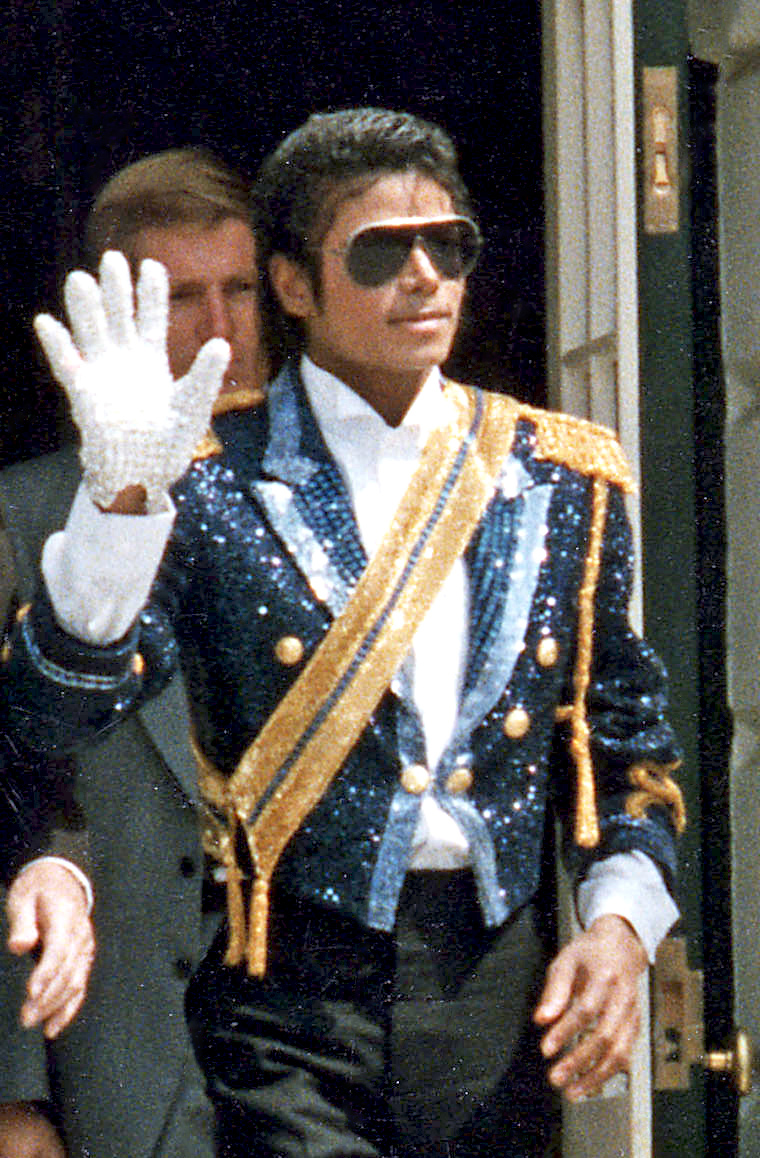
Michael Jackson in 1984

American singer-songwriter Michael Jackson recorded songs for ten studio albums, two posthumous studio albums, seventy-two compilation albums, three soundtrack albums, one live album and seven remix albums.

Jackson debuted on the professional music scene at age five as a member of the Jackson 5. The group set a chart record when its first four singles—"I Want You Back" (1969), "ABC" (1970), "The Love You Save" (1970), and "I'll Be There" (1970)—peaked at number one on the Billboard Hot 100. As Jackson began to emerge as a solo performer in the early 1970s, he maintained ties to the Jackson 5 and Motown. Between 1972 and 1975, Michael released four solo studio albums with Motown: Got to Be There (1972), Ben (1972), Music & Me (1973), and Forever, Michael (1975). "Got to Be There" and "Ben", the title tracks from his first two solo albums, became successful singles, as did a cover of Bobby Day's "Rockin' Robin". In June 1975, the Jackson 5 signed with Epic Records, a subsidiary of CBS Records, and released six more albums between 1976 and 1984. Michael, the group's lead songwriter during this time, wrote hits such as "Shake Your Body (Down to the Ground)" (1979), "This Place Hotel" (1980), and "Can You Feel It" (1980). Jackson's fifth solo album, Off the Wall (1979), co-produced by Jackson and Quincy Jones. Songwriters for the album included Jackson, Rod Temperton, Stevie Wonder, and Paul McCartney. Off the Wall was the first solo album to generate four top 10 hits in the United States: "Off the Wall", "She's Out of My Life", and the chart-topping singles "Don't Stop 'Til You Get Enough" and "Rock with You". This album helped Jackson win three awards at the American Music Awards and a Grammy Award for his solo efforts. Jackson recorded with Queen singer Freddie Mercury from 1981 to 1983, including a demo of "State of Shock", "Victory", and "There Must Be More to Life Than This". Jackson went on to record the single "State of Shock" with Mick Jagger for the Jacksons' album Victory (1984). In 1982, Jackson combined his interests in songwriting and film when he contributed the song "Someone in the Dark" to the storybook for the film E.T. the Extra-Terrestrial. The song, with Jones as its producer, won a Grammy for Best Recording for Children in 1983.

Jackson's sixth album, Thriller, was released in late 1982. The album earned Jackson seven Grammys and eight American Music Awards. Thriller was the first album to have seven Billboard Hot 100 top 10 singles, including "Billie Jean", "Beat It", and "Wanna Be Startin' Somethin'". Jackson's seventh album Bad (1987) produced nine singles with seven charting in the United States. Five of these singles ("I Just Can't Stop Loving You", "Bad", "The Way You Make Me Feel", "Man in the Mirror", and "Dirty Diana") reached number one on the Billboard Hot 100, a record for most number-one Hot 100 singles from any one album. In 1991, he released his eighth album, Dangerous, co-produced with Teddy Riley. The album produced four top ten singles on the Billboard Hot 100, including one number-one hit "Black or White", "Remember the Time", "In the Closet" and "Will You Be There" which produced and performed by Jackson the theme for the film Free Willy. In 1993, Jackson composed most of the music for the video game Sonic the Hedgehog 3 (1994). In June 1995, Jackson released his ninth album, HIStory: Past, Present and Future, Book I, a double album. The first disc, HIStory Begins, is a 15-track greatest hits album. The second disc, HIStory Continues, contains 13 original songs and two cover versions. The album features hits like "Scream", a duet with Jackson's youngest sister Janet Jackson, "Earth Song", "They Don't Care About Us", and "You Are Not Alone". "You Are Not Alone" holds the Guinness World Record for the first song ever to debut at number one on the Billboard Hot 100 chart. Jackson worked with collaborators including Teddy Riley and Rodney Jerkins to produce his tenth solo album, Invincible (2001). Invincible spawned two singles, "You Rock My World" and "Cry".

Michael Jackson's recorded music also encompasses providing background vocals for other artists like Diana Ross, Stevie Wonder, La Toya Jackson, Rebbie Jackson, Janet Jackson, Barry Gibb, and 3T. He collaborated with singers and musicians including the Jackson 5, Paul McCartney, and Freddie Mercury.

== Songs ==
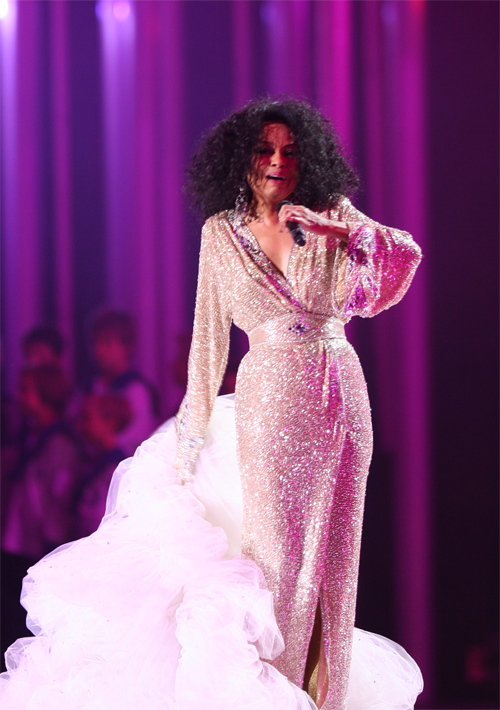
Diana Ross was featured in several songs with Jackson like "Eaten Alive" and "A Brand New Day".

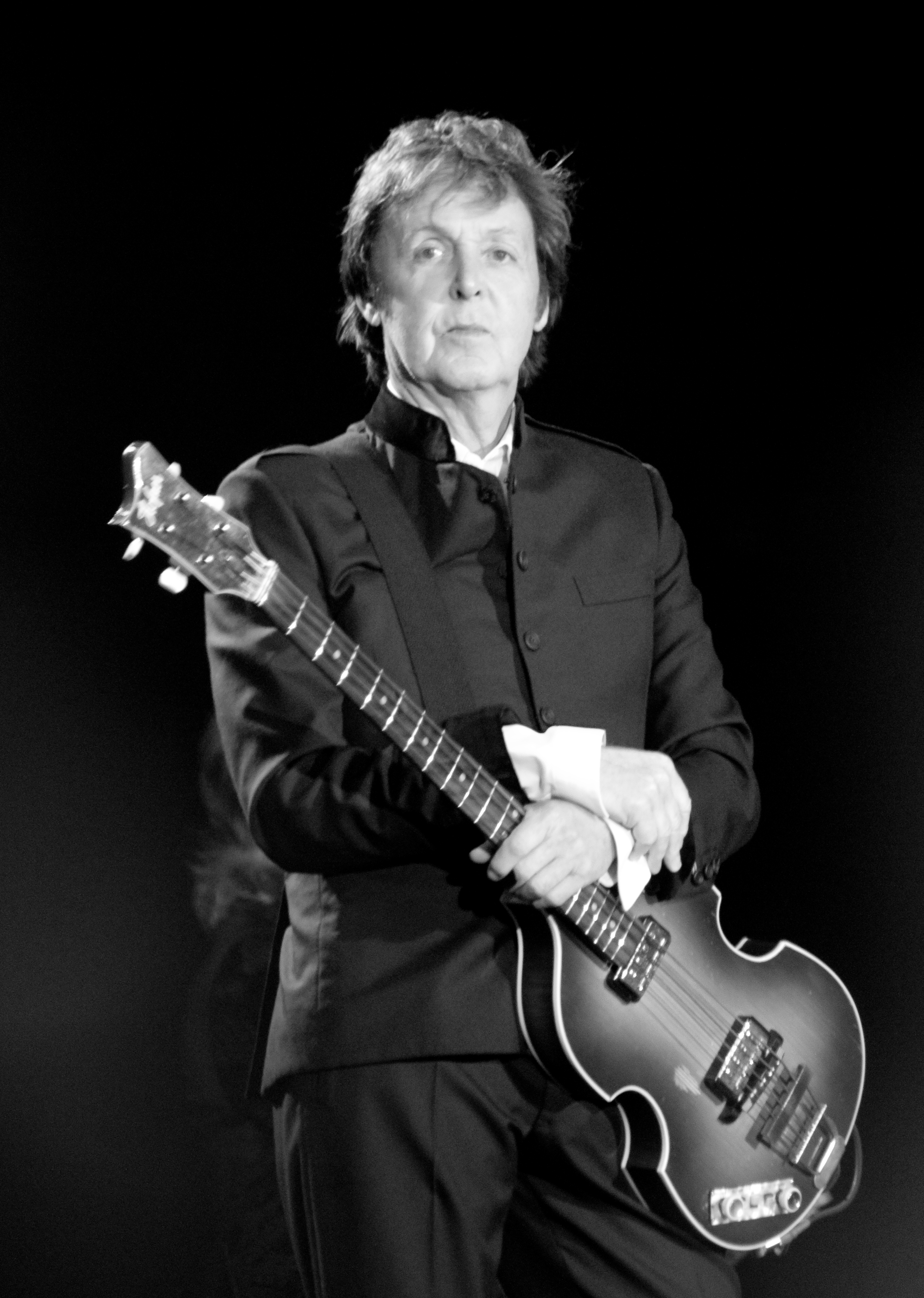
Paul McCartney was featured in "The Girl Is Mine", while Jackson was featured on McCartney's "Say Say Say" and "The Man".

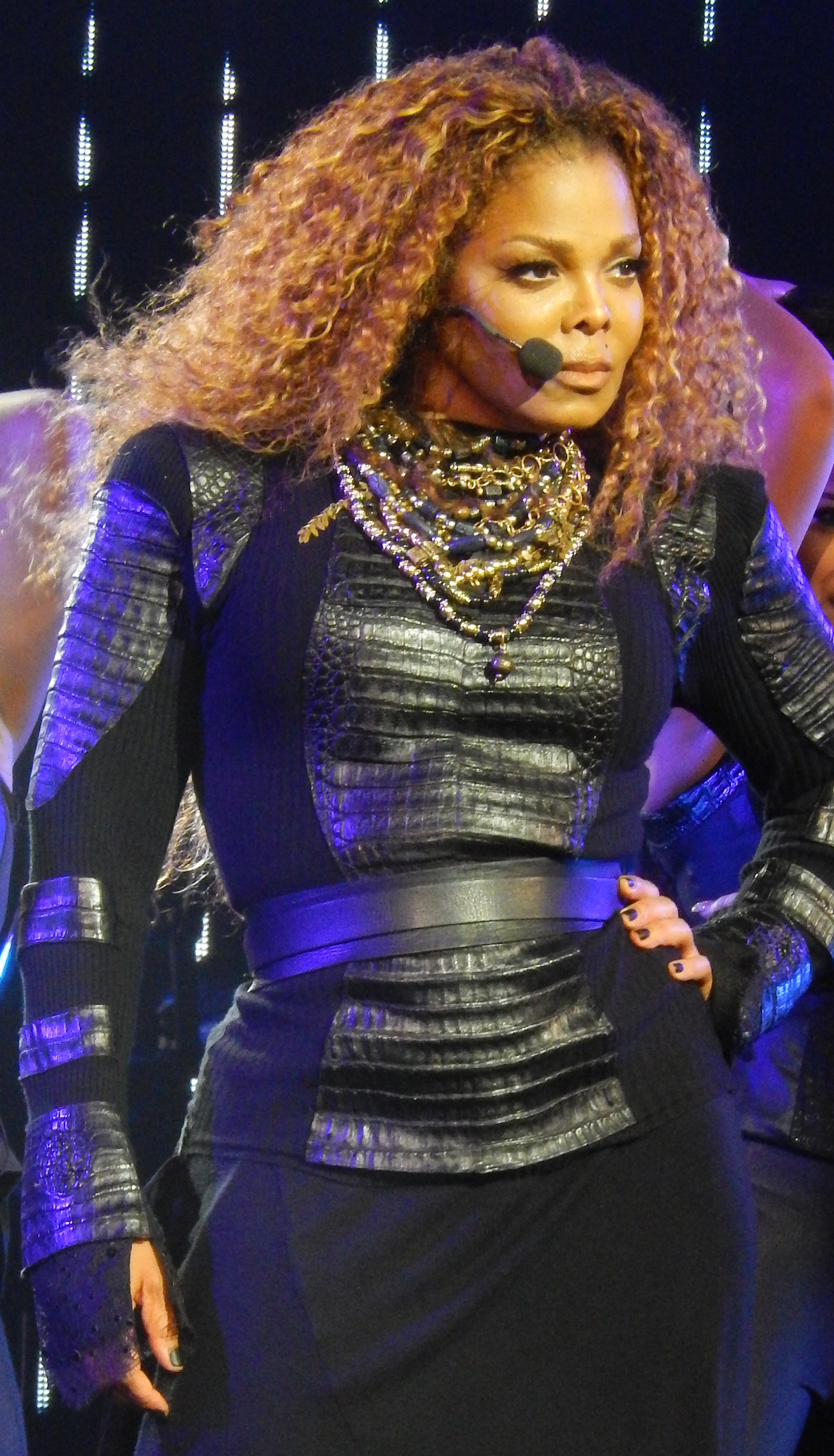
Janet Jackson was featured in "2300 Jackson Street" and "Scream".

List of songs, showing title, year of release, originating album, writer(s), notes and references.
Title	Year	Album	Writer(s)	Notes	Ref.
"2 Bad"	1995	HIStory: Past, Present and Future, Book I	Michael Jackson; Bruce Swedien; René Moore; Dallas Austin; Shaquille O'Neal	Rap by Shaquille O'Neal; Featured in the film Michael Jackson's Ghosts (1996)	
"2000 Watts"	2001	Invincible	Michael Jackson; Teddy Riley; Tyrese Gibson; Jaron Henson	Backing vocals by Riley	
"2300 Jackson Street"	1989	2300 Jackson Street	Jermaine Jackson; Jackie Jackson; Tito Jackson; Randy Jackson; Gene Griffin; Aaron Hall	The Jacksons with Michael, Marlon, Rebbie and Janet	
"A Brand New Day"	1978	The Wiz	Luther Vandross	Diana Ross, Jackson, Nipsey Russell and Ted Ross	
"A Place with No Name"	2014	Xscape	Michael Jackson; Elliot "Dr. Freeze" Straite; Dewey Bunnell	Written and recorded in 1998; Based on "A Horse with No Name", a hit song by rock band America	
"Ain't No Sunshine"	1972	Got to Be There	Bill Withers	Bill Withers cover	
"Al Capone"	2012	Bad 25	Michael Jackson	Recorded at Hayvenhurst during 1985–1986; Evolved into "Smooth Criminal"	
"All in Your Name"	2011	Non-album single	Barry Gibb; Michael Jackson	Barry Gibb duet with Michael Jackson; Recorded in 2002; Released by Gibb on June 25, 2011, the second anniversary of Michael Jackson's death, as a standalone single	
"All the Things You Are"	1973	Music & Me	Oscar Hammerstein II; Jerome Kern	Hiram Sherman cover	
"Another Part of Me"	1987	Bad	Michael Jackson	Featured in the film Captain EO (1986)	
"Baby Be Mine"	1982	Thriller	Rod Temperton		
"Bad"	1987	Bad	Michael Jackson	Originally intended as a duet with Prince; Remix with Afrojack, DJ Buddha and Pitbull released on Bad 25 (2012)	
"Be a Lion"	1978	The Wiz	Charlie Smalls	Diana Ross, Jackson, Nipsey Russell and Ted Ross	
"Beat It"	1982	Thriller	Michael Jackson	Guitar solo by Eddie Van Halen; Demo released on This Is It (2009); Remix with Fergie, titled "Beat It 2008", released on Thriller 25 (2008)	
"Beautiful Girl"	2004	The Ultimate Collection	Michael Jackson	Previously unreleased demo recorded between 1998 and 2004 during the Invincible sessions	
"Behind the Mask"	2010	Michael	Michael Jackson; Chris Mosdell; Ryuichi Sakamoto	Featuring additional background vocals by Shanice; Greg Philinganes recorded this song on the album Pulse (1984) with the contribution of Michael's background vocals; An agreement to share the royalties equally between Jackson, Chris Mosdell and Ryuichi Sakamoto broke down when the management of Yellow Magic Orchestra disagreed which prevented the song to be released on Jackson's sixth studio album, Thriller (1982); Demo released on Thriller 40 (2022)	
"Ben"	1972	Ben	Walter Scharf; Don Black	Theme from Ben (1972)	
"Best of Joy"	2010	Michael	Michael Jackson	Evolved from "The Toy" and reworked in 1991; One of the last songs that Jackson recorded during his lifetime, having recorded it in November 2008 in Los Angeles, California, the year before his death	
"Billie Jean"	1982	Thriller	Michael Jackson	1981 demo released on Thriller (Special Edition) (2001); Remix with Kanye West, titled "Billie Jean 2008", released on Thriller 25	
"Black or White"	1991	Dangerous	Michael Jackson; Bill Bottrell	Rap by L.T.B.	
"Blood on the Dance Floor"	1997	Blood on the Dance Floor: HIStory in the Mix	Michael Jackson; Teddy Riley	Originally recorded for the Dangerous album	
"Blue Gangsta"	2014	Xscape	Michael Jackson; Elliot "Dr. Freeze" Straite	Recorded in 1998	
"Break of Dawn"	2001	Invincible	Michael Jackson; Elliot "Dr. Freeze" Straite	Background vocals by Dr. Freeze	
"Burn This Disco Out"	1979	Off the Wall	Rod Temperton	Recorded in June 1979	
"Butterflies"	2001	Invincible	Andre Harris; Marsha Ambrosius	Remix with Eve	
"Call on Me"	1984	Farewell My Summer Love	Fonce Mizell; Larry Mizell	Original version released on Anthology (1995); Working title "Fussin' and Fightin'"	
"Can't Get Outta the Rain"	1982	B-side of "The Girl Is Mine"	Michael Jackson; Quincy Jones	An overdubbed version of The Wiz song "You Can't Win" (1978); Later released on The Essential Michael Jackson 3.0 (2008)	
"Can't Let Her Get Away"	1991	Dangerous	Michael Jackson; Teddy Riley		
"Carousel"	2001	Thriller (Special Edition)	Michael Sembello; Don Freeman	Short version released on Thriller (Special Edition) (2001); Full version released on several editions of King of Pop (2008) and on Thriller 40 (2022)	
"Centipede"	1984	Centipede	Michael Jackson	Rebbie Jackson featuring background vocals by Michael Jackson, La Toya Jackson and the Weather Girls	
"Cheater"	2004	The Ultimate Collection	Michael Jackson; Greg Phillinganes	Recorded in 1986	
"Chicago"	2014	Xscape	Cory Rooney	Recorded in 1999 under the title "She Was Lovin' Me"	
"Childhood"	1995	HIStory: Past, Present and Future, Book I	Michael Jackson	Theme from Free Willy 2 (1995)	
"Cinderella Stay Awhile"	1975	Forever, Michael	Michael Burnett Sutton; Mack David	Recorded in December 1974 and produced by Hal Davis	
"Come Together"	1995	HIStory: Past, Present and Future, Book I	John Lennon; Paul McCartney	The Beatles cover; Recorded in 1986 and appeared in the film Moonwalker (1988); Full version released on the single "Remember the Time" (1992); Edited version released on HIStory: Past, Present and Future, Book I (1995)	
"Cry"	2001	Invincible	R. Kelly	Recorded in 2000	
"D.S."	1995	HIStory: Past, Present and Future, Book I	Michael Jackson	Guitar by Slash	
"Dangerous"	1991	Dangerous	Michael Jackson; Bill Bottrell; Teddy Riley	Evolved from "Streetwalker"; Early version released on The Ultimate Collection (2004)	
"Dapper-Dan"	1975	Forever, Michael	Don Fletcher		
"Dear Michael"	1975	Forever, Michael	Hal Davis; Elliot Willensky	Recorded in December 1974	
"Dirty Diana"	1987	Bad	Michael Jackson	Guitar by Steve Stevens	
"Do You Know Where Your Children Are"	2014	Xscape	Michael Jackson	Written and recorded between 1986 and 1990	
"Doggin' Around"	1973	Music & Me	Lena Agree	1960 song written by Lena Agree and originally performed by Jackie Wilson	
"Don't Be Messin' 'Round"	2012	Bad 25	Michael Jackson	Features Jackson playing the piano	
"Don't Let It Get You Down"	1984	Farewell My Summer Love	Mel Larson; Jerry Marcellino; Deke Richards	Original version released on Anthology (1995)	
"Don't Matter to Me"	2018	Scorpion	Michael Jackson; Paul Anka; Aubrey Graham; Noah Shebib; Paul Jefferies; Nana Rogues; Negin Djafari	Drake with Jackson; Original vocals by Jackson recorded in 1980	
"Don't Stop 'Til You Get Enough"	1979	Off the Wall	Michael Jackson	1978 demo released on Off the Wall (Special Edition) (2001)	
"Don't Walk Away"	2001	Invincible	Michael Jackson; Teddy Riley; Richard Stites; Reed Vertelney		
"Earth Song"	1995	HIStory: Past, Present and Future, Book I	Michael Jackson	Originally written and composed by Jackson in 1988	
"Ease On down the Road"	1978	The Wiz	Charlie Smalls	Diana Ross and Jackson	
"Eaten Alive"	1985	Eaten Alive	Barry Gibb; Maurice Gibb; Michael Jackson	Diana Ross with Jackson and Barry Gibb	
"Euphoria"	1973	Music & Me	Leon Ware; Jacqueline Hilliard		
"Everybody's Somebody's Fool"	1972	Ben	Gladys Hampton; Regina Adams; Ace Adams	Originally recorded by Connie Francis	
"Fall Again"	2004	The Ultimate Collection	Walter Afanasieff; Robin Thicke	Recorded in 1999	
"Farewell My Summer Love"	1984	Farewell My Summer Love	Keni St. Lewis	Original version released on Anthology (1995); Working title "Let Me Count the Ways"	
"Fly Away"	2001	Bad (Special Edition)	Michael Jackson	Recorded by Rebbie Jackson for her album Yours Faithfully (1998), with Michael's backing vocals	
"For All Time"	2008	Thriller 25	Steve Porcaro; Michael Sherwood	Recorded during the Dangerous sessions; Completed and released on Thriller 25 (2008)	
"Free"	2012	Bad 25	Michael Jackson		
"Get It"	1987	Characters	Stevie Wonder	Wonder with Jackson	
"Get on the Floor"	1979	Off the Wall	Michael Jackson; Louis Johnson		
"Ghosts"	1997	Blood on the Dance Floor: HIStory in the Mix	Michael Jackson; Teddy Riley	Featured in the film Michael Jackson's Ghosts (1996)	
"Girl Don't Take Your Love from Me"	1972	Got to Be There	Willie Hutch		
"Girl You're So Together"	1984	Farewell My Summer Love	Keni St. Lewis	Original version released on Hello World: The Motown Solo Collection (2009)	
"Girlfriend"	1979	Off the Wall	Paul McCartney	Wings cover; Originally written for Jackson	
"Give In to Me"	1991	Dangerous	Michael Jackson; Bill Bottrell	Guitar by Slash	
"Gone Too Soon"	1991	Dangerous	Larry Grossman; Buz Kohan	Dedicated to the memory of Jackson's friend Ryan White	
"Got the Hots"	2008	Thriller 25 (Japanese Edition)	Rod Temperton		
"Got to Be There"	1972	Got to Be There	Elliot Willensky	First solo single by Jackson	
"Greatest Show on Earth"	1972	Ben	Mel Larson; Jerry Marcellino		
"Happy"	1973	Music & Me	Michel Legrand; Smokey Robinson	Love theme from Lady Sings the Blues (1972)	
"Heal the World"	1991	Dangerous	Michael Jackson	Version with Jackson's spoken words released on a very rare promo titled Signature Series (1992)	
"Heartbreaker"	2001	Invincible	Michael Jackson; Rodney Jerkins; Fred Jerkins III; LaShawn Daniels; Mischke Butler; Norman Gregg	Rap performed by Fats	
"Heaven Can Wait"	2001	Invincible	Michael Jackson; Teddy Riley; Andreao Heard; Nate Smith; Teron Beal; Eritza Laues; Kenny Quiller		
"Here I Am (Come and Take Me)"	1984	Farewell My Summer Love	Al Green; Mabon Hodges	Original version released on Hello World: The Motown Solo Collection (2009)	
"HIStory"	1995	HIStory: Past, Present and Future, Book I	Michael Jackson; James Harris III; Terry Lewis	Backing vocals by Boyz II Men	
"Hold My Hand"	2010	Michael	Aliaune Thiam; Giorgio Tuinfort; Claude Kelly	Duet with Akon; Originally recorded in December 2007 in Las Vegas, Nevada	
"Hollywood Tonight"	2010	Michael	Michael Jackson; Brad Buxer	Spoken bridge by Taryll Jackson and written by Teddy Riley	
"Human Nature"	1982	Thriller	Steve Porcaro; John Bettis		
"I Can't Help It"	1979	Off the Wall	Stevie Wonder; Susaye Greene		
"(I Can't Make It) Another Day"	2010	Michael	Lenny Kravitz	Features Kravitz; Includes vocals from "We've Had Enough"; Re-written by Lenny Kravitz and retitled "Storm" featuring Jay-Z on Kravitz's album Baptism (2004)	
"I Just Can't Stop Loving You"	1987	Bad	Michael Jackson	Duet with Siedah Garrett; Originally intended as a duet with Barbra Streisand, Whitney Houston, Aretha Franklin, or Agnetha Fältskog (formerly of ABBA); French and Spanish versions titled "Je Ne Veux Pas La Fin De Nous" and "Todo Mi Amor Eres Tu"	
"(I Like) The Way You Love Me"	2010	Michael	Michael Jackson	Demo titled "The Way You Love Me" released on The Ultimate Collection (2004)	
"I Wanna Be Where You Are"	1972	Got to Be There	Arthur "T-Boy" Ross; Leon Ware		
"If'n I Was God"	1986	Looking Back to Yesterday	Robert B. Sherman; Richard M. Sherman	Bobby Goldsboro cover	
"I'll Come Home to You"	1975	Forever, Michael	Freddie Perren; Christine Yarian		
"I'm in Love Again"	1980	Love Lives Forever	Minnie Riperton; Richard Rudolph	Virtual duet by Riperton and Jackson	
"I'm So Blue"	2012	Bad 25	Michael Jackson		
"In Our Small Way"	1972	Got to Be There	Beatrice Verdi; Christine Yarian	Later released on Ben (1972)	
"In the Back"	2004	The Ultimate Collection	Michael Jackson; Glen Ballard	Written and recorded in 1994; Worked on in 1997 for inclusion on the Blood on the Dance Floor: HIStory in the Mix album	
"In the Closet"	1991	Dangerous	Michael Jackson; Teddy Riley	Includes female vocals originally credited to "Mystery Girl", later revealed to be Princess Stéphanie of Monaco; Originally intended as a duet with Madonna	
"Invincible"	2001	Invincible	Michael Jackson; Rodney Jerkins; Fred Jerkins III; LaShawn Daniels; Norman Gregg	Rap performed by Fats	
"Is It Scary"	1997	Blood on the Dance Floor: HIStory in the Mix	Michael Jackson; James Harris III; Terry Lewis	Featured in the film Michael Jackson's Ghosts (1996)	
"It's the Falling in Love"	1979	Off the Wall	Carole Bayer Sager; David Foster	With Patti Austin	
"Jam"	1991	Dangerous	Michael Jackson; Teddy Riley; Bruce Swedien; René Moore	Rap by Heavy D	
"Je Ne Veux Pas la Fin de Nous"	2012	Bad 25	Michael Jackson; Christine Decroix	Duet with Siedah Garrett; French version of "I Just Can't Stop Loving You"	
"Johnny Raven"	1973	Music & Me	Billy Page		
"Just a Little Bit of You"	1975	Forever, Michael	Edward Holland Jr. Brian Holland		
"Just Good Friends"	1987	Bad	Terry Britten; Graham Lyle	With Stevie Wonder	
"Keep the Faith"	1991	Dangerous	Michael Jackson; Glen Ballard; Siedah Garrett	Choir arrangement by Andrae Crouch	
"Leave Me Alone"	1987	Bad	Michael Jackson	Released on later reissues and on the CD edition of Bad (1987)	
"Liberian Girl"	1987	Bad	Michael Jackson	Spoken part by Letta Mbulu; Originally written in 1983 for the Jacksons' Victory album (1984)	
"Little Christmas Tree"	1973	A Motown Christmas	George S. Clinton; Artie Wayne	Later released on the reissues of the Jackson 5 Christmas Album (1970)	
"Little Susie"	1995	HIStory: Past, Present and Future, Book I	Michael Jackson		
"Lonely Teardrops"	1986	Looking Back to Yesterday	Berry Gordy; Gwen Gordy; Tyran Carlo	Jackie Wilson cover	
"Love Is Here and Now You're Gone"	1972	Got to Be There	Holland–Dozier–Holland	The Supremes cover	
"Love Never Felt So Good"	2014	Xscape	Michael Jackson; Paul Anka	Two versions released as singles, solo and duet with Justin Timberlake; Written in 1980; Recorded by Johnny Mathis and released on his 1984 album A Special Part of Me	
"Love's Gone Bad"	1986	Looking Back to Yesterday	Holland–Dozier–Holland	The Jackson 5 version released on Boogie (1979)	
"Loving You"	2014	Xscape	Michael Jackson	Jackson wrote and recorded the track in the mid-1980s before bringing the multitrack tapes to his trusted engineer, Matt Forger, to mix	
"Man in the Mirror"	1987	Bad	Glen Ballard; Siedah Garrett	Backing vocals by Siedah Garrett, the Winans, and the Andraé Crouch Choir	
"Maria (You Were the Only One)"	1972	Got to Be There	Lawrence Brown; Linda Glover; George Gordy; Allen Story		
"Melodie"	1984	Farewell My Summer Love	Mel Larson; Jerry Marcellino; Deke Richards	Original version released on Anthology (1995)	
"Mind Is the Magic"	1995	Dreams & Illusions	Michael Jackson	Written and recorded by Jackson in 1989 for Siegfried & Roy's Beyond Belief Show; Jackson gave his permission for Siegfried & Roy to release the song on their German album Dreams & Illusions (1995)	
"Money"	1995	HIStory: Past, Present and Future, Book I	Michael Jackson		
"Monkey Business"	2004	The Ultimate Collection	Michael Jackson; Bill Bottrell	Originally recorded in 1989 for the Dangerous album	
"Morning Glow"	1973	Music & Me	Stephen Schwartz		
"Morphine"	1997	Blood on the Dance Floor: HIStory in the Mix	Michael Jackson	Guitar by Slash; Also known as "Just Say No"; Uses samples from the 1980 film The Elephant Man	
"Much Too Soon"	2010	Michael	Michael Jackson		
"Music and Me"	1973	Music & Me	Jerry Marcellino; Mel Larson; Don Fenceton; Mike Cannon		
"My Girl"	1972	Ben	Smokey Robinson; Ronald White	The Temptations cover; The Jackson 5 pre-Motown version released on Big Boy (1993)	
"Night Time Lover"	1980	La Toya Jackson	La Toya Jackson; Michael Jackson	La Toya with Michael	
"Off the Wall"	1979	Off the Wall	Rod Temperton		
"On the Line"	1997	The Ultimate Collection	Michael Jackson; Kenneth "Babyface" Edmonds	Originally recorded by Jackson for the Spike Lee film Get on the Bus in 1996; Short version with a fade out was included on a 3-track minimax CD single, which was released as part of the Deluxe Collector Box Set of Michael Jackson's Ghosts on December 11, 1997, in the United Kingdom; the full length version of the song was later released on The Ultimate Collection (2004)	
"One Day in Your Life"	1975	Forever, Michael	Sam Brown III; Renée Armand		
"One More Chance"	2003	Number Ones	R. Kelly		
"P.Y.T. (Pretty Young Thing)"	1982	Thriller	James Ingram; Quincy Jones	Demo written by Jackson and Greg Phillinganes; Demo released on The Ultimate Collection (2004) and the deluxe edition of Thriller 40 (2022); Remix with will.i.am, titled "P.Y.T. (Pretty Young Thing) 2008", released on Thriller 25 (2008)	
"People Make the World Go 'Round"	1972	Ben	Thom Bell; Linda Creed	The Stylistics cover	
"Planet Earth"	2009	This Is It	Michael Jackson	Poem, published in the liner notes of Dangerous (1991)	
"Price of Fame"	2012	Bad 25	Michael Jackson	Had been scheduled as the theme for a Pepsi commercial starring Jackson, but was replaced by "Bad"	
"Privacy"	2001	Invincible	Michael Jackson; Rodney Jerkins; Fred Jerkins III; LaShawn Daniels; Bernard Belle	Guitar by Slash	
"Remember the Time"	1991	Dangerous	Michael Jackson; Teddy Riley; Bernard Belle		
"Rock with You"	1979	Off the Wall	Rod Temperton		
"Rockin' Robin"	1972	Got to Be There	Leon Rene	Bobby Day cover; Leon Rene is credited under the pseudonym "Jimmie Thomas"	
"Save Me"	1980	Old Crest on a New Wave	Jim Krueger	Dave Mason with Jackson	
"Say Say Say"	1983	Pipes of Peace	Paul McCartney; Michael Jackson	Paul McCartney with Jackson	
"Scared of the Moon"	2004	The Ultimate Collection	Michael Jackson; Buz Kohan		
"Scream"	1995	HIStory: Past, Present and Future, Book I	Michael Jackson; Janet Jackson; James Harris III; Terry Lewis	Duet with Janet Jackson	
"She Drives Me Wild"	1991	Dangerous	Michael Jackson; Teddy Riley; Aqil Davidson	Rap by Wreckx-n-Effect	
"She's Out of My Life"	1979	Off the Wall	Tom Bahler	Demo released on This Is It (2009)	
"She's Trouble"	2022	Thriller 40	Sue Shifrin; Bill Livsey; Terry Britten	Also known as "Trouble"	
"Shoo-Be-Doo-Be-Doo-Da-Day"	1972	Ben	Stevie Wonder; Sylvia Moy; Henry Cosby	Stevie Wonder cover	
"Shout"	2001	B-side of "Cry"	Michael Jackson; Teddy Riley; Claude Forbes; Roy Hamilton; Samuel Hoskins; Carmen Lampson	B-side of "Cry" (2001); Intended to be released on Invincible (2001), but was replaced with "You Are My Life" at the last minute; Later released on The Ultimate Fan Extras Collection (2013)	
"Slave to the Rhythm"	2014	Xscape	L.A. Reid; Kenneth "Babyface" Edmonds; Daryl Simmons; Kevin Roberson	Recorded during the Dangerous sessions in 1991	
"Smile"	1995	HIStory: Past, Present and Future, Book I	Charlie Chaplin; John Turner; Geoffrey Parsons	Originally an instrumental theme from Charlie Chaplin's 1936 film Modern Times; Vocal cover of lyrics originally sung by Nat King Cole	
"Smooth Criminal"	1987	Bad	Michael Jackson	Evolved from "Al Capone"	
"Somebody's Watching Me"	1984	Somebody's Watching Me	Kennedy Gordy	Rockwell with Michael on chorus and Jermaine Jackson on backing vocals	
"Someone in the Dark"	1982	E.T. the Extra-Terrestrial	Alan Bergman; Marilyn Bergman; Rod Temperton	Originally released on the audiobook for E.T. the Extra-Terrestrial (1982); A short "closing version" of the song was included only in the audiobook for E.T. the Extra-Terrestrial (1982); Later released in an extended edit on Thriller (Special Edition) (2001), The Ultimate Collection (2004)	
"Someone Put Your Hand Out"	2004	The Ultimate Collection	Michael Jackson; Teddy Riley	Released in May 1992 as an exclusive Pepsi promotional single; Edited version intended for Bad (Special Edition) (2001) but failed to make the final cut; Later released on The Ultimate Collection (2004)	
"Song Groove (a.k.a. Abortion Papers)"	2012	Bad 25	Michael Jackson		
"Speechless"	2001	Invincible	Michael Jackson		
"Speed Demon"	1987	Bad	Michael Jackson	Remix with Nero released on Bad 25 (2012)	
"Stranger in Moscow"	1995	HIStory: Past, Present and Future, Book I	Michael Jackson	Written on September 15, 1993, in Moscow, Russia during the Dangerous World Tour; Evolved from the credits theme for the video game Sonic the Hedgehog 3 (1994)	
"Starlight"	2022	Thriller 40	Rod Temperton	Evolved into "Thriller"	
"Streetwalker"	2001	Bad (Special Edition)	Michael Jackson	Evolved into "Dangerous"	
"Sunset Driver"	2004	The Ultimate Collection	Michael Jackson	Originally scheduled to appear on the special edition reissue of Off the Wall in 2001	
"Superfly Sister"	1997	Blood on the Dance Floor: HIStory in the Mix	Michael Jackson; Bryan Loren	Originally recorded for the Dangerous album	
"Tabloid Junkie"	1995	HIStory: Past, Present and Future, Book I	Michael Jackson; James Harris III; Terry Lewis		
"Take Me Back"	1975	Forever, Michael	Edward Holland Jr. Brian Holland		
"Tell Me I'm Not Dreamin' (Too Good to Be True)"	1984	Dynamite	Michael Omartian; Bruce Sudano; Jay Gruska	Jermaine Jackson with Michael	
"That's What Love Is Made Of"	1986	Looking Back to Yesterday	William "Smokey" Robinson; Robert Rogers; Warren Moore	The Miracles cover	
"The Girl Is Mine"	1982	Thriller	Michael Jackson	With Paul McCartney; Remix with will.i.am, titled "The Girl Is Mine 2008", released on Thriller 25 (2008); Solo demo version with Jackson's vocals only released on the single "The Girl Is Mine 2008" (2008)	
"The Lady in My Life"	1982	Thriller	Rod Temperton		
"The Lost Children"	2001	Invincible	Michael Jackson	Features Jackson's son Prince and Aldo Cascio	
"The Man"	1983	Pipes of Peace	Paul McCartney; Michael Jackson	McCartney with Jackson	
"The Toy"	2022	Thriller 40	Michael Jackson	Recorded in 1981; Evolved into "Best of Joy"	
"The Way You Make Me Feel"	1987	Bad	Michael Jackson		
"There Must Be More to Life Than This"	2014	Queen Forever	Freddie Mercury	Mercury and Jackson recorded the song as a duet during 1981–1983 along with two other songs, "Victory" and "State of Shock"; the latter was re-recorded with Mick Jagger and released on the Jacksons' Victory album (1984); Released as a solo track by Mercury on his album Mr. Bad Guy (1985); Reworked duet version released on Queen's album Queen Forever (2014)	
"They Don't Care About Us"	1995	HIStory: Past, Present and Future, Book I	Michael Jackson		
"This Is It"	2009	This Is It	Michael Jackson; Paul Anka	Backing vocals by the Jacksons; Originally recorded as a duet with Anka in 1980 under the title "I Never Heard"; Sa-Fire recorded "I Never Heard" for the album I Wasn't Born Yesterday (1991); Theme from Michael Jackson's This Is It (2009); Duet version released on Anka's album Duets (2013)	
"This Time Around"	1995	HIStory: Past, Present and Future, Book I	Michael Jackson; Dallas Austin; Bruce Swedien; René Moore; Christopher Wallase	Rap by the Notorious B.I.G.	
"Threatened"	2001	Invincible	Michael Jackson; Rodney Jerkins; Fred Jerkins III; LaShawn Daniels	Contains snippets of Rod Serling's narration from the TV show The Twilight Zone	
"Thriller"	1982	Thriller	Rod Temperton	Spoken rap by Vincent Price; Second rap verse released on Thriller (Special Edition) (2001); Evolved from "Starlight"	
"To Make My Father Proud"	1984	Farewell My Summer Love	Bob Crewe; Larry Weiss	Original version released on Anthology (1995)	
"Todo Mi Amor Eres Tú"	2001	Bad (Special Edition)	Michael Jackson; Rubén Blades	Duet with Siedah Garrett; Spanish version of "I Just Can't Stop Loving You"	
"Todo Para Ti"	2001	Non-album single	Michael Jackson; Rubén Blades	Recorded with various artists; Charity song for the victims of the September 11 attacks; Spanish version of "What More Can I Give"	
"Too Young"	1973	Music & Me	Sidney Lippman; Sylvia Dee	Nat King Cole cover	
"Touch the One You Love"	1984	Farewell My Summer Love	Artie Wayne; George S. Clinton	Original version released on Hello World: The Motown Solo Collection (2009)	
"Twenty-Five Miles"	1987	The Original Soul of Michael Jackson	Edwin Starr; Bert Berns; Jerry Ragovoy; Johnny Bristol; Harvey Fuqua	Edwin Starr cover; Original version released on Hello World: The Motown Solo Collection (2009)	
"Unbreakable"	2001	Invincible	Michael Jackson; Rodney Jerkins; Fred Jerkins III; LaShawn Daniels; Nora Payne; Robert Smith; Christopher Wallace	Rap by the Notorious B.I.G.; Background vocals by Brandy Norwood	
"Up Again"	1973	Music & Me	Freddie Perren; Christine Yarian		
"Wanna Be Startin' Somethin'"	1982	Thriller	Michael Jackson	Demo released on This Is It (2009); Remix with Akon, titled "Wanna Be Startin' Somethin' 2008", released on Thriller 25 (2008) and includes new vocals recorded by Jackson in 2007	
"We Are Here to Change the World"	2004	The Ultimate Collection	Michael Jackson; John Barnes	Featured in the film Captain EO (1986)	
"We Are the World"	1985	We Are the World	Michael Jackson; Lionel Richie	Recorded with USA for Africa; Solo demo version released on The Ultimate Collection (2004); 25th anniversary version for Haiti released in 2010	
"We're Almost There"	1975	Forever, Michael	Edward Holland Jr. Brian Holland		
"We've Got a Good Thing Going"	1972	Ben	Berry Gordy; Freddie Perren; Alphonzo Mizell; Deke Richards		
"We've Got Forever"	1975	Forever, Michael	Elliot Willensky		
"We've Had Enough"	2004	The Ultimate Collection	Michael Jackson; Rodney Jerkins; LaShawn Daniels; Carole Bayer Sager		
"What a Lovely Way to Go"	2022	Thriller 40	Michael Jackson	Written in the late 1970s	
"What Goes Around Comes Around"	1972	Ben	Allen Levinsky; Arthur Stokes; Dana Meyers; Floyd Weatherspoon		
"What More Can I Give"	2001	Non-album single	Michael Jackson	Recorded with various artists; Charity song for the victims of the September 11 attacks; Spanish version titled "Todo Para Ti"	
"Whatever Happens"	2001	Invincible	Michael Jackson; Teddy Riley; Gil Cang; Jasmine Quay; Geoffrey Williams	Guitar and whistle solo by Carlos Santana	
"Whatzupwitu"	1993	Love's Alright	Eddie Murphy; Trenten Gumbs	Murphy with Jackson	
"When I Come of Age"	1986	Looking Back to Yesterday	Weldon Dean Parks; Don Fletcher; Hal Davis		
"Who Do You Know"	2022	Thriller 40	Michael Jackson	Written in 1980	
"Who Is It"	1991	Dangerous	Michael Jackson		
"Who's Lookin' for a Lover"	1986	Looking Back to Yesterday	Jacqueline Dalya Hilliard; Leon Ware		
"Why"	1995	Brotherhood	Kenneth "Babyface" Edmonds	3T with Jackson	
"Why You Wanna Trip on Me"	1991	Dangerous	Teddy Riley; Bernard Belle		
"Will You Be There"	1991	Dangerous	Michael Jackson	Theme from Free Willy (1993); Choir arrangement by Andrae Crouch	
"Wings of My Love"	1972	Got to Be There	Berry Gordy; Freddie Perren; Alphonzo Mizell; Deke Richards		
"With a Child's Heart"	1973	Music & Me	Sylvia Moy; Henry Cosby; Vicki Basemore	Stevie Wonder cover	
"Workin' Day and Night"	1979	Off the Wall	Michael Jackson	1978 demo released on Off the Wall (Special Edition) (2001)	
"Xscape"	2014	Xscape	Michael Jackson; Rodney Jerkins; Fred Jerkins III; LaShawn Daniels	Recorded during the Invincible sessions	
"You Are My Life"	2001	Invincible	Michael Jackson; Kenneth "Babyface" Edmonds; Carole Bayer Sager; John McClain	Written for Jackson's children	
"You Are Not Alone"	1995	HIStory: Past, Present and Future, Book I	R. Kelly		
"You Are There"	1975	Forever, Michael	Sam Brown III; Randy Meitzenheimer; Christine Yarian		
"You Can Cry on My Shoulder"	1972	Ben	Berry Gordy		
"You Can't Win"	1978	The Wiz	Charlie Smalls		
"You Rock My World"	2001	Invincible	Michael Jackson; Rodney Jerkins; Fred Jerkins III; LaShawn Daniels; Nora Payne	Intro with Chris Tucker; Remix with Jay-Z	
"You've Got a Friend"	1972	Got to Be There	Carole King	Carole King cover	
"You've Really Got a Hold on Me"	1984	Farewell My Summer Love	Smokey Robinson; Ronald White; Robert Rogers	The Miracles cover; Original version released on Hello World: The Motown Solo Collection (2009); The Jackson 5 version released on The Ultimate Rarities Collection 1: Motown Sings Motown Treasures (1998)	

=== Songs with background vocals contributions ===
List of songs, showing title, year of release, originating album, writer(s), notes and references.
Title	Year	Album	Writer(s)	Notes	Ref.
"All Eyez on Me"	2002	All Eyez on Me	Monica Arnold; LaShawn Daniels; James Ingram; Quincy Jones	Monica with Jackson's background vocals from "P.Y.T. (Pretty Young Thing)" with ad-libs taken from the Invincible recording sessions	
"All I Do"	1980	Hotter than July	Stevie Wonder; Clarence Paul; Morris Broadnax	Wonder with backing vocals by Jackson	
"Alright Now"	1990	Ralph Tresvant	Michael Jackson; John Barnes	Ralph Tresvant with backing vocals by Jackson	
"Children's Holiday"	1998	Non-album single	Michael Jackson	J-Friends with backing vocals by Jackson	
"Do the Bartman"	1990	The Simpsons Sing the Blues	Bryan Loren; Michael Jackson	The Simpsons featuring background vocals by Jackson	
"Don't Let a Woman (Make a Fool Out of You)"	1982	Synapse Gap (Mundo Total)	Joe King Carrasco; Johnny Perez	Joe King Carrasco and the Crowns featuring background vocals by Jackson	
"Don't Stand Another Chance"	1984	Dream Street	Janet Jackson; Marlon Jackson; John Barnes	Janet Jackson with backing vocals by Michael Jackson, Marlon Jackson, Tito Jackson and Jackie Jackson	
"Girls, Girls, Girls, Pt. 2"	2001	The Blueprint	Tom Brock; Shawn Carter; Justin Smith	Jay-Z with backing vocals by Jackson and Chante Moore	
"Goin' Back to Alabama"	1981	Share Your Love	Lionel Richie	Kenny Rogers with backing vocals by Jackson and Richie	
"I Need You"	1995	Brotherhood	Eric Carmen	Eric Carmen cover; 3T with Jackson on backing vocals	
"It's Not Worth It"	2002	Full Moon	LaShawn Daniels; Fred Jerkins III; Rodney Jerkins	Brandy with backing vocals of Jackson	
"Joy"	1994	Blackstreet	Teddy Riley; Michael Jackson; Tammy Lucas	Blackstreet with backing vocals by Jackson	
"Just Friends"	1981	Sometimes Late at Night	Carole Bayer Sager; Burt Bacharach; Peter Allen	Bayer Sager with Jackson	
"Low"	2018	Raise Vibration	Lenny Kravitz	Kravitz with backing vocals by Jackson	
"Muscles"	1982	Silk Electric	Michael Jackson	Diana Ross with Jackson on backing vocals	
"Papa Was a Rollin' Stone"	1982	Wolf	Norman Whitfield; Barrett Strong	Bill Wolfer with backing vocals by Jackson; The Temptations cover; Live version by the Jackson 5 released on The Jackson 5 in Japan (1973)	
"People of the World"	1999	Non-album single	Michael Jackson	J-Friends with backing vocals by Jackson	
"So Why"	1982	Wolf	John Gibson	Bill Wolfer with backing vocals by Jackson	
"State of Independence"	1982	Donna Summer	Jon Anderson; Vangelis	Donna Summer featuring background vocals by Jackson, Brenda Russell, James Ingram, Dionne Warwick, Kenny Loggins, Lionel Richie, Stevie Wonder and various artists	
"The Dude"	1981	The Dude	Rod Temperton; Patti Austin	Quincy Jones featuring James Ingram and Jackson	
"This Had to Be"	1980	Light Up the Night	Michael Jackson; Louis Johnson; George Johnson	The Brothers Johnson with backing vocals by Jackson	
"To Satisfy You"	1992	Music for the New World	Bryan Loren; Michael Jackson	Loren with backing vocals by Jackson	
"What's Your Game?"	1974	Non-album single	Jackson 5	M-D-L-T- Willis with backing vocals and instrumentation by Jackson and his brothers; Drums played by Jackson; Also produced by the Jackson 5	
"Who's Right, Who's Wrong"	1979	Keep the Fire	Kenny Loggins; Richard Page	Loggins with backing vocals by Jackson	
"Yeah"	1993	Love's Alright	Eddie Murphy	Murphy with backing vocals by Jackson and various artists	
"You're the One"	1985	Say You Love Me	Michael Jackson	Jennifer Holliday with backing vocals by Jackson	

== See also ==
- Michael Jackson albums discography
- Michael Jackson singles discography
- Michael Jackson videography
- List of unreleased songs recorded by Michael Jackson
- List of songs recorded by the Jackson 5
