= Michael Jackson albums discography =

Recording collections by American singer

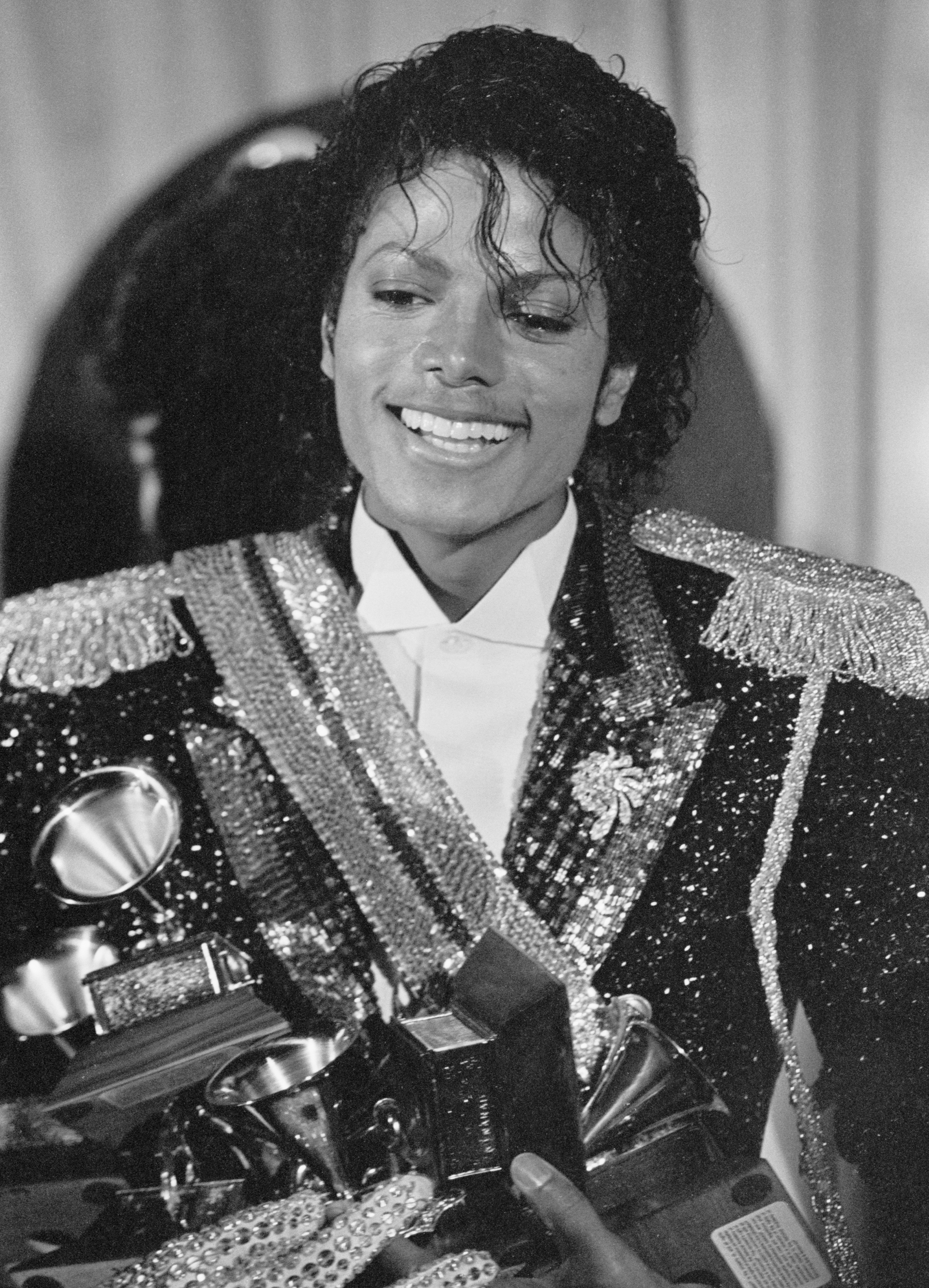
- Jackson in 1984
- Studio albums: 10
- Soundtrack albums: 5
- Compilation albums: 51
- Video albums: 10
- Remix albums: 7
- Reissues: 7
- Box sets: 5

American singer-songwriter Michael Jackson (1958–2009) released ten studio albums, five soundtrack albums, fifty-five compilation albums, ten video albums, and seven remix albums. Following his death in June 2009, two albums, with unreleased tracks, have been posthumously released. Jackson made his debut at the age of six as the lead singer of The Jackson 5 (later known as The Jacksons) in 1964, who were prominent performers during the 1970s. Jackson is one of the best-selling music artists in history with over 500 million records sold worldwide. According to the Recording Industry Association of America (RIAA), Jackson has sold 90 million certified albums in the United States.

In 1972, Jackson released his debut studio album, Got to Be There, in which was released through Motown, while he was still part of The Jackson 5. It peaked at number 14 on the US Billboard Top LPs & Tape chart and was certified Gold by the Recording Industry Association of America (RIAA). The same year, he released another album, Ben, which peaked at number 5 on the Billboard Top LPs & Tape chart and was certified silver by the British Phonographic Industry. The album's title track was a commercial success on the music charts, topping both the US and the Australian ARIA charts, giving Jackson his first number 1 single on the Billboard Hot 100 as a solo artist. Jackson's next two studio albums were Music & Me (1973) and Forever, Michael (1975). In 1975, Jackson signed to Epic Records, and released his fifth studio album, Off the Wall, in 1979. It peaked at number 3 on the Billboard Top LPs & Tape chart and spawned two number 1 singles on the Billboard Hot 100 in the United States. Off the Wall made Jackson the first solo artist to have four singles from the same album peak in the top 10 on the Billboard Hot 100. The album was certified Diamond by the RIAA and has sold over 20 million copies worldwide, making it one of the best-selling albums of all time. At the 1980 Grammy Awards, it was nominated for two awards, with Jackson winning Best R&B Vocal Performance, Male.

Jackson's sixth studio album, Thriller (1982), became his first number 1 album on the Billboard Top LPs & Tape chart. Thriller spent a record thirty-seven non-consecutive weeks at number 1, from February 26, 1983, to April 14, 1984. Seven singles were released and all reached the top 10 on the Billboard Hot 100 chart. This feat set the record for the most top 10 singles from an album, with "Beat It" and "Billie Jean" reaching number 1. It was the best-selling album worldwide in 1983 and was also the first to become the best-selling album in the United States for two years between 1983 and 1984. The album broke racial barriers in popular music, enabling Jackson's appearances on MTV and meeting with US President Ronald Reagan at the White House. The album set the standard for the music industry with its music videos, and promotion strategies. It influenced artists, record labels, producers, marketers, and choreographers. Thriller was certified 34× Platinum by the RIAA and remains the best-selling album of all time, with sales of 70 million copies worldwide. It won a record-breaking eight awards at the 1984's Grammy Awards (where it won Album of the Year) and the 1984's American Music Awards. In 1987, Jackson released his seventh studio album, Bad. It debuted at number 1 on the Billboard Top Pop Albums chart in the United States. The album also reached number 1 in twenty-five other countries. Seven singles charted highly on the Billboard Hot 100, including a record-breaking five number 1 singles. With a certification of 11× Platinum by the RIAA and sales of over 35 million copies worldwide, Bad is one of the best-selling albums of all time.

Jackson entered the 1990s with the release of his eighth studio album, Dangerous, in 1991. The album was Jackson's first since Forever, Michael to not be produced by longtime collaborator Quincy Jones. Dangerous debuted at number 1 on the US Billboard Top Pop Albums chart and in thirteen other countries. The album sold five million copies worldwide in its first week and was the best-selling album worldwide of 1992. Dangerous was certified 8× Platinum by the RIAA and is one of the best-selling albums of all time having sold over 32 million copies worldwide. Jackson's ninth studio album HIStory (1995) debuted at number 1 on the US Billboard 200, along with nineteen other countries. The album was certified 8× Platinum by the RIAA and has sold over 20 million copies worldwide, making it one of the best-selling albums of all time. Jackson released his remix album Blood on the Dance Floor: HIStory in the Mix in 1997. It has sold over six million copies worldwide, making it the best-selling remix album of all time. Jackson's tenth and final studio album, Invincible, was released in 2001, and topped international charts, with sales over 8 million copies worldwide. Following Jackson's death in 2009, sales of his previous work soared, with his compilation albums Number Ones (2003) and The Essential Michael Jackson (2005) becoming the first catalog albums to outsell any new album and becoming international best-sellers. These two were later certified 5× times Platinum by the RIAA. Following the surge in sales in March 2010, Sony Music signed a $250 million deal with the Jackson estate to extend their distribution rights to Jackson's back catalog until at least 2017. As part of this deal, two posthumous albums of previously unreleased tracks were released: Michael (2010) and Xscape (2014). In 2017, Sony renewed their deal for $250 million that went into effect in January 2018.

== Studio albums ==
List of studio albums, with selected chart positions, sales figures and certifications
Title	Album details	Peak chart positions										Sales	Certifications (sales threshold)
Title	Album details	US	AUS	CAN	FRA	GER	NL	NZ	SPN	SWI	UK	Sales	Certifications (sales threshold)
Got to Be There	Released: January 24, 1972; Label: Motown; Formats: LP, cassette, 8-track	14	—	—	121	—	—	—	—	—	37		RIAA: Gold
Ben	Released: August 4, 1972; Label: Motown; Formats: LP, cassette, 8-track	5	65	12	162	—	—	—	—	—	17		BPI: Silver
Music & Me	Released: April 13, 1973; Label: Motown; Formats: LP, cassette, 8-track	92	27	—	108	—	—	—	—	—	—		
Forever, Michael	Released: January 16, 1975; Label: Motown; Formats: LP, cassette, 8-track	101	—	—	—	—	—	—	—	—	—		
Off the Wall	Released: August 10, 1979; Label: Epic Records, CBS Records; Formats: Reel-to-reel, LP, cassette, 8-track	3	1	4	27	25	8	2	11	27	3	CAN: 300,000; FRA: 1,000,000	RIAA: Diamond; ARIA: 5× Platinum; MC: Platinum; SNEP: Platinum; BVMI: Platinum; NVPI: Platinum; RMNZ: 6× Platinum; SWI: Platinum; UK: 6× Platinum
Thriller	Released: November 29, 1982; Label: Epic Records; Formats: Reel-to-reel, LP, cassette, 8-track, CD	1	1	1	1	1	1	1	1	1	1	AUS: 1,150,000; CAN: 2,400,000; NL: 1,400,000; UK: 4,470,000	RIAA: 3× Diamond (34× Platinum); ARIA: 17× Platinum; MC: 3× Diamond; FRA: Diamond; GER: 3× Platinum; NVPI: 8× Multi-Platinum; RMNZ: 12× Platinum; SWI: 6× Platinum; BPI: 16× Platinum
Bad	Released: August 31, 1987; Label: Epic Records; Formats: LP, cassette, 8-track, CD	1	2	1	1	1	1	1	1	1	1	US: 10,000,000; NL: 500,000; UK: 4,140,000	RIAA: Diamond (11× Platinum); AUS: 6× Platinum; MC: Diamond; FRA: Diamond; BVMI: 4× Platinum; NVPI: Platinum; RMNZ: 9× Platinum; SWI: 5× Platinum; BPI: 15× Platinum
Dangerous	Released: November 26, 1991; Label: Epic Records; Formats: LP, cassette, CD	1	1	2	1	1	1	1	1	1	1	AUS: 740,000; UK: 2,010,069	RIAA: 8× Platinum; AUS: 10× Platinum; CAN: 6× Platinum; FRA: Diamond; GER: 4× Platinum; NL: 3× Multi-Platinum; NZ: 6× Platinum; SWI: 5× Platinum; UK: 6× Platinum
HIStory: Past, Present and Future, Book I	Released: June 20, 1995; Label: Epic Records; Formats: LP, cassette, CD, MD	1	1	1	1	1	1	1	1	1	1	US: 4,000,000; UK: 1,500,000	RIAA: 8× Platinum; ARIA: 8× Platinum; CAN: 5× Platinum; FRA: Diamond; GER: 3× Platinum; NL: 3× Multi-Platinum; NZ: 10× Platinum; SWI: 3× Platinum; BPI: 4× Platinum
Invincible	Released: October 30, 2001; Label: Epic Records; Formats: LP, cassette, CD, MD	1	1	1	1	1	1	4	2	1	1	US: 2,400,000; CAN: 100,000	RIAA: 2× Platinum; ARIA: 2× Platinum; SNEP: Platinum; BVMI: Platinum; NVPI: Platinum; RMNZ: Platinum; SWI: Platinum; BPI: Platinum
"—" denotes releases that did not chart

== Soundtrack albums ==
List of soundtrack albums, with selected chart positions and certifications
Title	Album details	Peak chart positions										Certifications (sales threshold)
Title	Album details	US	AUS	CAN	FRA	GER	NL	NZ	SPN	SWI	UK	Certifications (sales threshold)
The Wiz	Type: Soundtrack; Release date: September 18, 1978; Label: MCA Records; Formats: LP, cassette	40	—	—	—	—	—	—	—	—	—	US: Gold
E.T. the Extra-Terrestrial	Type: Audiobook / Soundtrack; Release date: November 15, 1982; Label: MCA Records; Formats: LP, cassette	37	—	—	—	—	—	—	—	—	82	
Michael Jackson's This Is It	Type: Soundtrack; Release date: October 26, 2009; Label: Epic Records; Formats: LP, CD	1	2	1	1	3	1	1	3	2	3	US: 2× Platinum; AUS: Platinum; CAN: 2× Platinum; FRA: 3× Platinum; GER: 3× Gold; NL: Platinum; NZ: 2× Platinum; UK: 2× Platinum
Selections from Michael Jackson's This Is It	Type: EP; Release date: October 26, 2009; Label: Epic Records	91	—	—	—	—	—	—	—	—	—	
Immortal	Type: Soundtrack / Remix album; Release date: November 21, 2011; Label: Epic Records; Formats: CD	24	43	28	42	23	17	35	16	17	65	
Michael: Songs from the Motion Picture	Type: Soundtrack; Released: April 24, 2026; Label: Epic Records; Formats: LP, cassette, CD	37	17	4	1	6	31	1	13	7	4	NZ: Gold
"—" denotes releases that did not chart

== Compilation albums ==
=== As a solo artist ===
List of compilation albums, with selected chart positions, sales figures and certifications
Title	Album details	Peak chart positions										Sales	Certifications (sales threshold)
Title	Album details	US	AUS	CAN	FRA	GER	NL	NZ	SPN	SWI	UK	Sales	Certifications (sales threshold)
The Best of Michael Jackson	Released: August 28, 1975; Label: Motown; Formats: LP, cassette	156	76	—	16	—	3	—	—	—	11		UK: Silver
Motown Superstar Series, Vol. 7	Released: 1980; Label: Motown; Formats: LP, cassette	—	—	—	—	—	—	—	—	—	—		
One Day in Your Life	Released: March 25, 1981; Label: Motown; Formats: LP, cassette	144	—	—	—	—	—	—	—	—	29		
Farewell My Summer Love	Released: May 8, 1984; Label: Motown; Formats: Reel-to-reel, LP, cassette, 8-track	46	90	94	—	40	47	50	—	—	9		UK: Gold
Ain't No Sunshine	Released: 1984; Label: Motown; Formats: Vinyl, LP	—	—	—	—	—	—	—	—	—	—		
The Great Love Songs of Michael Jackson	Released: 1984; Label: Motown; Formats: Vinyl, LP	—	—	—	—	—	—	—	—	—	—		
Motown Classics	Released: 1993; Label: Motown; Formats: CD	—	—	—	—	—	—	—	—	—	—		
12 Inch Mixes	Released: June 30, 1998; Label: Epic Records; Formats: CD	—	—	—	—	—	—	—	—	—	—		AUS: Platinum
Greatest Hits: HIStory, Volume I	Released: November 13, 2001; Label: Epic Records; Formats: CD, LP, cassette	85	44	8	10	—	—	—	54	45	15	UK: 245,000	UK: Gold; US: Platinum; AUS: Gold
Number Ones	Released: November 18, 2003; Label: Epic Records; Formats: Cassette, CD, video CD, DVD, HDCD, UMD Music Video	6	2	1	5	2	17	1	17	9	1	US: 5,300,000	US: 5× Platinum; AUS: 6× Platinum; GER: Gold; NZ: 4× Platinum; SWI: Gold; UK: 10× Platinum
The Ultimate Collection	Released: November 17, 2004; Label: Epic Records; Formats: CD, DVD	154	—	29	29	37	46	—	29	33	75		US: Platinum
The Essential Collection	Released: May 3, 2005; Label: Universal Music; Formats: CD	—	—	—	—	—	—	—	—	—	—		
Best 1200	Released: June 27, 2005; Label: Universal Music; Formats: CD	—	—	—	—	—	—	—	—	—	—		
The Essential Michael Jackson	Released: July 19, 2005; Label: Epic Records; Formats: LP, CD	31	1	4	1	10	19	1	23	2	1	US: 2,120,000; UK: 829,884	US: 5× Platinum; AUS: 9× Platinum; FRA: 2× Gold; NZ: 4× Platinum; UK: 7× Platinum
Thriller – 25th Anniversary Edition	Release date: February 12, 2008; Label: Epic Records; Formats: LP, CD, DVD	a	a	2	1	2	2	1	2	1	3		CAN: Gold; SWI: Gold; UK: Platinum
King of Pop	Released: August 22, 2008; Label: Epic Records; Formats: CD	—	5	—	1	1	1	6	1	1	3		AUS: 2× Platinum; FRA: Platinum; GER: 7× Gold; NZ: Platinum; UK: Platinum
Michael	Released: December 10, 2010; Label: Epic Records; Formats: LP, CD	3	10	2	4	1	1	10	2	2	4	US: 541,000; FRA: 120,000	US: Platinum; AUS: Gold; CAN: Platinum; FRA: 2× Platinum; NL: Gold; NZ: Gold; UK: Platinum
Bad – 25th Anniversary Edition	Release date: September 18, 2012; Label: Epic Records; Formats: LP, CD	46	a	—	5	4	6	a	2	a	a		
The Indispensable Collection	Released: June 21, 2013; Label: MJJ Productions; Formats: Digital download	—	—	—	—	—	—	—	—	—	—		
The Ultimate Fan Extras Collection	Released: June 24, 2013; Label: MJJ Productions; Formats: Digital download	—	—	—	—	—	—	—	—	—	—		
Xscape	Released: May 9, 2014; Label: Epic Records; Formats: LP, CD	2	2	3	1	2	2	3	1	2	1		US: Gold; AUS: Gold; CAN: Gold; FRA: Platinum; GER: Gold; NZ: Platinum; SWI: Gold; UK: Gold
Scream	Released: September 29, 2017; Label: Sony Music; Formats: LP, CD, digital download	33	14	69	28	22	30	—	9	34	9	FRA: 3,300; US: 14,000	UK: Silver
Thriller 40	Release date: November 18, 2022; Label: Epic Records; Formats: LP, CD, digital download	a	a	a	a	a	a	22	a	a	a		
"—" denotes releases that did not chart "a" in these countries, the releases were counted with the original album

=== With The Jackson 5 ===
List of compilation albums, with selected chart positions, sales figures and certifications
Title	Album details	Peak chart positions										Certifications (sales threshold)
Title	Album details	US	AUS	CAN	FRA	GER	NL	NZ	SPN	SWI	UK	Certifications (sales threshold)
A Collection of Michael Jackson's Oldies	Released: December 8, 1972; Label: Motown	—	—	—	—	—	—	—	—	—	—	
Great Songs and Performances That Inspired the Motown 25th Anniversary TV Special	Released: 1983; Label: Motown; Formats: LP, cassette	—	—	—	—	—	—	—	—	—	—	
18 Greatest Hits	Released: July 1, 1983; Label: Motown, Telstar; Formats: LP, cassette	—	53	—	—	—	23	22	—	—	1	UK: Platinum
14 Greatest Hits	Released: 1984; Label: Motown; Formats: LP, cassette	168	—	—	—	—	—	—	—	—	—	
Looking Back to Yesterday	Released: February 11, 1986; Label: Motown; Formats: LP	—	—	—	—	—	—	—	—	—	—	
Anthology	Released: November 14, 1986; Label: Motown; Formats: CD	—	—	—	17	—	—	—	89	—	—	
Motown's Greatest Hits	Released: 1992; Label: Motown; Formats: LP, cassette, CD	—	27	—	6	—	—	—	—	—	53	
The Best of Michael Jackson & The Jackson 5ive	Released: 1997; Label: Motown; Formats: CD	—	—	—	—	—	—	—	—	—	5	UK: Gold
The Very Best of Michael Jackson with The Jackson Five	Released: 1999; Label: Motown; Formats: cassette, CD	—	41	—	—	—	—	—	—	—	15	NZ: Platinum; UK: Platinum
Early Classics	Released: December 28, 1999; Label: Motown; Formats: CD	—	—	—	—	—	—	—	—	—	—	
Ripples and Waves: An Introduction to the Jackson 5	Released: July 3, 2000; Label: Motown; Formats: CD	—	—	—	—	—	—	—	—	—	—	
20th Century Masters – The Millennium Collection: The Best of Michael Jackson	Released: 2000; Label: Motown; Formats: CD	—	—	27	—	—	—	—	—	—	—	
Love Songs	Released: January 15, 2002; Label: Motown; Formats: CD	—	—	—	—	—	—	—	—	—	—	
The Silver Collection	Released: June 4, 2007; Label: Motown; Formats: CD	—	—	—	—	—	—	—	—	—	—	
Gold	Released: August 26, 2008; Label: Motown; Formats: CD	139	—	—	—	—	60	—	—	—	—	
The Motown Years	Released: September 6, 2008; Label: Motown, Universal Music; Formats: CD	—	14	—	4	36	4	12	7	19	4	AUS: Gold; UK: Gold
The Definitive Collection	Released: August 25, 2009; Label: Motown; Formats: CD	39	—	—	—	—	—	—	—	—	—	
Pure Michael: Motown A Cappella	Released: September 8, 2009; Label: Motown; Formats: CD	—	—	—	—	—	—	—	—	—	—	
Best Selection	Released: September 15, 2009; Label: Universal Music; Formats: CD	—	—	—	—	—	—	—	—	—	—	
La Légende de la Pop	Released: 2009; Label: Pias France; Formats: CD, DVD	—	—	—	19	—	—	—	—	—	—	
Mellow: Michael Jackson	Released: June 14, 2011; Label: Motown; Formats: CD	—	—	—	—	—	—	—	—	—	—	
Michael: The Birth of A Superstar (Note: The localized versions of this album with the same track listing are available in France (released May 1, 2026) and Thailand (released May 8, 2026). The global version is not available in those regions.)	Released: April 3, 2026; Label: uDiscover Music, Universal Music; Formats: Digital download	—	—	—	—	—	—	—	—	—	—	
"—" denotes releases that did not chart

=== With other artists ===
List of compilation albums, with selected chart positions, sales figures and certifications
Title	Album details	Peak chart positions		Certifications (sales threshold)
Title	Album details	AUS	UK	Certifications (sales threshold)
Their Very Best – Back to Back (with Diana Ross, Gladys Knight and Stevie Wonder)	Released: 1986; Label: Motown; Formats: LP	—	21	
Love Songs (with Diana Ross)	Released: 1987; Label: Motown; Formats: LP, cassette, CD	86	12	UK: Platinum
"—" denotes releases that did not chart

- In the United States, between May 25, 1991, and November 25, 2009, catalog albums (albums at least 18 months old which have fallen below No. 100 on the Billboard 200 chart and do not have an active single on the Billboard radio charts) were not eligible to chart on the Billboard 200, but could only chart on the Top Catalog Albums, so between November 20, 2003, and November 25, 2009, Billboard launched the Top Comprehensive Albums chart that included current and catalog albums. The following albums appeared on this chart while not eligible for the Billboard 200: Number Ones (number 1), The Essential Michael Jackson (number 2), Greatest Hits: HIStory, Volume 1 (number 28), The Ultimate Collection (number 32), 7 CD Mega Bundle (number 78), The Definitive Collection (number 43), The Stripped Mixes (number 67), Selections from Michael Jackson's This Is It (number 102) and Gold (number 166).

== Remix albums ==
List of remix albums, with selected chart positions and certifications
Title	Album details	Peak chart positions										Certifications (sales threshold)
Title	Album details	US	AUS	CAN	FRA	GER	NL	NZ	SPN	SWI	UK	Certifications (sales threshold)
The Michael Jackson Mix	Release date: 1987; Label: Stylus; Formats: LP, cassette, CD	—	—	—	—	—	—	—	—	—	27	UK: Platinum
The Original Soul of Michael Jackson	Release date: October 1987; Label: Motown; Formats: LP	—	—	—	—	—	—	—	—	—	—	
Dangerous – The Remix Collection	Release date: September 9, 1993; Label: Epic Records; Formats: LP, CD	—	—	—	—	—	—	—	—	—	—	
Blood on the Dance Floor: HIStory in the Mix	Release date: May 11, 1997; Label: Epic Records, Sony Music, MJJ; Formats: LP, cassette, CD, MiniDisc	24	2	16	1	2	1	1	1	2	1	US: Platinum; AUS: Platinum; CAN: Gold; FRA: Platinum; GER: Gold; NL: Platinum; NZ: Platinum; SWI: Platinum; UK: Platinum
The Stripped Mixes	Release date: July 28, 2009; Label: Motown; Formats: LP, CD	57	—	—	—	—	—	—	—	—	76	
The Remix Suite	Release date: October 20, 2009; Label: Motown; Formats: LP, CD	175	—	—	56	—	—	—	—	—	—	
"—" denotes releases that did not chart

== Box sets ==
List of box sets, with selected chart positions and certifications
Title	Album details	Peak chart positions								Certifications (sales threshold)
Title	Album details	AUS	FRA	GER	NL	NZ	SPN	SWI	UK	Certifications (sales threshold)
Tour Souvenir Pack	March, 1992; Label: Epic Records; Formats: CD									
The Ultimate Collection	Released: November 16, 2004; Label: Epic Records; Formats: CD, DVD									
Visionary: The Video Singles	Released: February 20, 2006; Label: Epic Records; Formats: DualDisc	—	—	—	—	27	—	—	—	
Thriller 25: Limited Japanese Single Collection	Released: March 8, 2008; Label: Epic Records; Formats: LP, CD	—	—	—	—	—	—	—	—	
The Collection	Released: June 29, 2009; Label: Epic Records; Formats: CD	2	1	2	2	—	1	4	14	FRA: Platinum
Hello World: The Motown Solo Collection	Release date: September 1, 2009; Label: Hip-O, Motown; Formats: CD	—	—	—	—	—	—	—	—	
"—" denotes releases that did not chart

== See also ==
- Michael Jackson singles discography
- Michael Jackson videography
- The Jackson 5 discography
- List of best-selling albums
