= Love Songs (Michael Jackson album) =

Compilation album by Michael Jackson
- Released: January 15, 2002
- Recorded: 1969–1974
- Length: 48:14
- Label: Motown
- Producers: Harry Weinger; Anthony Ellis (compilation producers)

Michael Jackson chronology
Invincible (2001)	Love Songs (2002)	Number Ones (2003)

Love Songs is a compilation album by American singer and recording artist Michael Jackson, including some with the Jackson 5. It was released on January 15, 2002, by Motown.

== Overview ==
The compilation album contains 14 love songs and ballads Michael Jackson recorded, with the Jackson 5 or solo, during his Motown tenure. It was released by Motown on January 15, 2002.

Love Songs includes the Jackson 5's "Who's Lovin' You", their cover of Ray Charles' "A Fool for You", and a previously unreleased version of their hit "I'll Be There".

The album also includes Michael Jackson's 1971 single "Got to Be There" and further alternate recordings such as the original mix of his "Call on Me" from Farewell My Summer Love (1984; recorded in 1973); the pre-dubbed version of this song was also released on the 1995 reissue of Anthology and on Hello World: The Motown Solo Collection (2009).

== Track listing ==
Tracks 1, 2, 7, 11 and 14 performed by the Jackson 5

No.	Title	Writer(s)	Length
1.	"Who's Lovin' You" (single version)	Smokey Robinson	4:21
2.	"A Fool for You"	Ray Charles	4:34
3.	"Everybody's Somebody's Fool"	Jack Keller, Howard Greenfield	2:57
4.	"Got to Be There"	Elliot Willensky	3:20
5.	"We're Almost There"	Brian Holland, Edward Holland, Jr.	3:42
6.	"We've Got a Good Thing Going"	The Corporation	2:59
7.	"Maybe Tomorrow" (Goin' Back to Indiana Version)	The Corporation	3:24
8.	"Call on Me" (original mix)	Fonce Mizell, Larry Mizell	3:20
9.	"You Are There"	Sam Brown III, Randy Meitzenheimer, Christine Yarian	3:22
10.	"One Day in Your Life"	Sam Brown III, Renée Armand	4:15
11.	"If I Don't Love You This Way"	Pam Sawyer, Leon Ware	3:25
12.	"Wings of My Love"	The Corporation	3:17
13.	"I'll Come Home to You"	Freddie Perren, Christine Yarian	3:02
14.	"I'll Be There" (previously unreleased version)	The Corporation	4:05
