= 20th Century Masters – The Millennium Collection: The Best of Michael Jackson =

Greatest hits album by Michael Jackson
- Released: November 21, 2000
- Recorded: June 1971 – December 1974
- Length: 35:36
- Label: Motown
- Producers: The Corporation; Fonce Mizell; Mel Larson; Jerry Marcellino; Brian Holland; Bob Gaudio (recording producers); Harry Weinger (compilation producer)

Michael Jackson chronology
Blood on the Dance Floor: HIStory in the Mix (1997)	20th Century Masters – The Millennium Collection: The Best of Michael Jackson (2000)	Invincible (2001)

Alternate cover
- Icon edition

20th Century Masters – The Millennium Collection: The Best of Michael Jackson is a 2000 compilation album of early songs by American singer and recording artist Michael Jackson.

The album was re-released on compact disc on March 6, 2012, as Icon.

== Release ==
The compilation album, featuring some of Jackson's early solo recordings such as "Got to Be There", "Ben", and "Rockin' Robin", was released on November 21, 2000, by Motown. It was released as part of the 20th Century Masters – The Millennium Collection series.

The album was rereleased on compact disc on March 6, 2012, as Icon. marking the ninth album to be released by either Epic/Sony Music and/or Motown/Universal Music since Jackson's death in June 2009.

== Reception ==
Stephen Thomas Erlewine said the album "doesn't contain every single one of his early solo hits, but it does contain the great majority of them, which means it might satisfy the tastes of many listeners who just want a sampling of the best of this era".

Charlotte Robinson from PopMatters said that "the short, budget format of this series sometimes shortchanges artists by omitting key tracks, but it's the ideal setting for Jackson, who, as a latecomer to Motown, suffered from sub-par material as the label lost its focus. There are just enough highlights on The Best of Michael Jackson to convince you of his brilliance."

== Track listing ==
No.	Title	Writer(s)	Album	Length
1.	"Got to Be There"	Elliot Willensky	Got to Be There (1972)	3:23
2.	"I Wanna Be Where You Are"	Leon Ware, T-Boy Ross	Got to Be There	2:57
3.	"Rockin' Robin"	Jesse Thomas	Got to Be There	2:31
4.	"People Make the World Go 'Round"	Linda Creed, Thom Bell	Ben (1972)	3:13
5.	"With a Child's Heart"	Henry Cosby, Sylvia May, Vicky Basemore	Music & Me (1973)	3:34
6.	"Happy" (Love Theme from Lady Sings the Blues)	Henry Cosby, Sylvia May, Vicky Basemore	Music & Me	3:25
7.	"Ben"	Don Black, Walter Scharf	Ben	2:44
8.	"We're Almost There"	Brian Holland, Eddie Holland Jr.	Forever, Michael (1975)	3:43
9.	"Just a Little Bit of You"	Brian Holland, Eddie Holland Jr.	Forever, Michael	3:12
10.	"One Day In Your Life"	Renee Armand, Sam Brown	Forever, Michael	4:16
11.	"Music and Me"	Don Fenceton, Jerry Marcellino, Mel Larson, Mike Cannon	Music & Me	2:38
Total length:				35:36
