= List of Official Albums Streaming Chart number ones of 2026 =

The Official Albums Streaming Chart is a weekly music chart in the United Kingdom which calculates the most popular albums on audio streaming sites.

== Number ones ==
Key
No.	nth album to top the Official Albums Streaming Chart
re	Return of an album to number one

Contents

No.	Artist (Note: The artist, song, date of reaching number one and number of weeks at number one are those given by the OCC.)	Album	Record label (Note: The record labels are those given by the OCC.)	Reached number one (for the week ending)	Weeks at number one	Ref.
re	Michael Bublé	Christmas	Reprise	1 January 2026	1	
re	Olivia Dean	The Art of Loving	Polydor	8 January 2026	10	
re	Olivia Dean	The Art of Loving	Polydor	15 January 2026	10	
re	Olivia Dean	The Art of Loving	Polydor	22 January 2026	10	
re	Olivia Dean	The Art of Loving	Polydor	29 January 2026	10	
re	Olivia Dean	The Art of Loving	Polydor	5 February 2026	10	
re	Olivia Dean	The Art of Loving	Polydor	12 February 2026	10	
re	Olivia Dean	The Art of Loving	Polydor	19 February 2026	10	
re	Olivia Dean	The Art of Loving	Polydor	26 February 2026	10	
re	Olivia Dean	The Art of Loving	Polydor	5 March 2026	10	
re	Olivia Dean	The Art of Loving	Polydor	12 March 2026	10	
143	Harry Styles	Kiss All the Time. Disco, Occasionally	Columbia	19 March 2026	3	
143	Harry Styles	Kiss All the Time. Disco, Occasionally	Columbia	26 March 2026	3	
143	Harry Styles	Kiss All the Time. Disco, Occasionally	Columbia	2 April 2026	3	
144	Raye	This Music May Contain Hope	Human Re Sources	9 April 2026	1	
re	Olivia Dean	The Art of Loving	Polydor	16 April 2026	3	
re	Olivia Dean	The Art of Loving	Polydor	23 April 2026	3	
re	Olivia Dean	The Art of Loving	Polydor	30 April 2026	3	
145	Noah Kahan	The Great Divide	Mercury	7 May 2026	1	
146	Michael Jackson	The Essential Michael Jackson	Epic/Legacy	14 May 2026	2	
146	Michael Jackson	The Essential Michael Jackson	Epic/Legacy	21 May 2026	2	
147	Drake	Iceman	OVO/Republic	28 May 2026	1	
re	Michael Jackson	The Essential Michael Jackson	Epic/Legacy	4 June 2026	3	
re	Michael Jackson	The Essential Michael Jackson	Epic/Legacy	11 June 2026	3	
re	Michael Jackson	The Essential Michael Jackson	Epic/Legacy	18 June 2026	3	
148	Olivia Rodrigo	You Seem Pretty Sad for a Girl So in Love	Geffen	25 June 2026	2	
148	Olivia Rodrigo	You Seem Pretty Sad for a Girl So in Love	Geffen	2 July 2026	2	
re	Michael Jackson	The Essential Michael Jackson	Epic/Legacy	9 July 2026	5	
re	Michael Jackson	The Essential Michael Jackson	Epic/Legacy	16 July 2026	5	
re	Michael Jackson	The Essential Michael Jackson	Epic/Legacy	23 July 2026	5	
re	Michael Jackson	The Essential Michael Jackson	Epic/Legacy	30 July 2026	5	
re	Michael Jackson	The Essential Michael Jackson	Epic/Legacy	6 August 2026	5	
149	Ariana Grande	Petal	Republic	13 August 2026	1	
re	Michael Jackson	The Essential Michael Jackson	Epic/Legacy	20 August 2026	7	
re	Michael Jackson	The Essential Michael Jackson	Epic/Legacy	27 August 2026	7	
re	Michael Jackson	The Essential Michael Jackson	Epic/Legacy	3 September 2026	7	
re	Michael Jackson	The Essential Michael Jackson	Epic/Legacy	10 September 2026	7	
re	Michael Jackson	The Essential Michael Jackson	Epic/Legacy	17 September 2026	7	
re	Michael Jackson	The Essential Michael Jackson	Epic/Legacy	24 September 2026	7	
re	Michael Jackson	The Essential Michael Jackson	Epic/Legacy	1 October 2026	7	
re	Taylor Swift	The Life of a Showgirl	EMI	8 October 2026	1	
re	Michael Jackson	The Essential Michael Jackson	Epic/Legacy	15 October 2026	2	
re	Michael Jackson	The Essential Michael Jackson	Epic/Legacy	22 October 2026	2	
150	Fontaines D.C.	Dopamine Chamber	XL	29 October 2026	1	
re	Michael Jackson	The Essential Michael Jackson	Epic/Legacy	5 November 2026	2	
re	Michael Jackson	The Essential Michael Jackson	Epic/Legacy	12 November 2026	2	
re	Olivia Rodrigo	You Seem Pretty Sad for a Girl So in Love	Geffen	19 November 2026	1	
