= The Essential Michael Jackson =

Greatest hits album by Michael Jackson
- Released: July 19, 2005
- Recorded: 1969–2003
- Length: 78:56 (North American disc 1); 78:50 (North American disc 2); 33:07 (3.0 disc); 77:42 (International disc 1); 77:24 (International disc 2)
- Labels: Epic; Legacy; Sony Music
- Producers: Michael Jackson; various

Michael Jackson chronology
| The Ultimate Collection (2004) | The Essential Michael Jackson (2005) | Visionary: The Video Singles (2006) |

Professional ratings
Review scores
| Source | Rating |
|---|---|
| AllMusic | 4.5/5 stars |
| Pitchfork | 8.7/10 |

The Essential Michael Jackson is a greatest hits compilation album by American singer-songwriter Michael Jackson. It was released on July 19, 2005, by Sony Music's catalog division Legacy Recordings as part of The Essential series. The two-disc compilation features thirty-eight hit songs by Michael Jackson, from his days at Motown Records with The Jackson 5 in the late 1960s and early 1970s to his 2001 hit "You Rock My World".

On August 26, 2008, The Essential Michael Jackson 3.0 was released in the United States as a limited edition containing an additional disc of seven songs performed by Jackson. A re-titled release in the United Kingdom was released on September 5, 2005, as The Hits. As of 2021, the album was certified 5× platinum in the United States for over 2.5 million copies sold. Worldwide, the compilation has sold an estimated 6 million copies.

== Impact of album after death ==
Following Jackson's death on June 25th, 2009, the album sold 102,000 units in the US on the chart week ending July 1, 2009. The following week the album sold 125,000 units in the US on the chart week ending July 8, 2009 and was the third biggest-selling album of the week. In the UK, where the album had peaked at number two in 2005, it reached number one for seven consecutive weeks from the weeks ending July 11, 2009 to August 22, 2009, dethroning Jackson's own album, Number Ones, which topped the chart the week ending July 4, 2009.

The album has been certified 5× platinum in the United States 9× Platinum in Australia and 7× Platinum in the United Kingdom with worldwide sales estimated around 6 million copies.

As of November 30, 2024, the album reached a new milestone by remaining on the Billboard 200 chart for 500 consecutive weeks. This is Jackson's second album to achieve this feat right after his album Thriller, which holds the record for 653 weeks on the chart.

On 8 May 2026, the album returned to number 1 position on the official UK charts, due to the popularity of the biopic Michael.

== Track listing ==
=== North American version ===
All tracks are written by Michael Jackson, except where noted.

Disc one
| No. | Title | Writer(s) | Album | Length |
|---|---|---|---|---|
| 1. | "I Want You Back" | The Corporation (Freddie Perren, Alphonso Mizell, Berry Gordy, Deke Richards) | Diana Ross Presents The Jackson 5 (1969) | 2:58 |
| 2. | "ABC" | The Corporation | ABC (1970) | 2:58 |
| 3. | "The Love You Save" | The Corporation | ABC | 3:05 |
| 4. | "Got to Be There" | Elliot Willensky | Got to Be There (1972) | 3:25 |
| 5. | "Rockin' Robin" | Jimmie Thomas | Got to Be There | 2:32 |
| 6. | "Ben" | Walter Scharf; Don Black | Ben (1972) | 2:46 |
| 7. | "Enjoy Yourself" (edit of alternative version) | Kenneth Gamble; Leon Huff | The Jacksons (1976) | 3:24 |
| 8. | "Blame It on the Boogie" (edited version) | Michael G. Jackson-Clark; David Jackson-Rich; Hans Kampschroer; Elmar Krohn; Thomas Meyer | Destiny (1978) | 3:30 |
| 9. | "Shake Your Body (Down to the Ground)" (7" version) | Michael Jackson; Randy Jackson | Destiny | 3:46 |
| 10. | "Don't Stop 'Til You Get Enough" (original 12" edit) | | Off the Wall (1979) | 5:50 |
| 11. | "Rock with You" (7" remix) | Rod Temperton | Off the Wall | 3:23 |
| 12. | "Off the Wall" (attempted recreation of US 7" remix) | Temperton | Off the Wall | 3:46 |
| 13. | "She's Out of My Life" | Tom Bahler | Off the Wall | 3:37 |
| 14. | "Can You Feel It" (7" edit) | Michael Jackson; Jackie Jackson | Triumph (1980) | 3:50 |
| 15. | "The Girl Is Mine" (duet with Paul McCartney) | | Thriller (1982) | 3:42 |
| 16. | "Billie Jean" | | Thriller | 4:54 |
| 17. | "Beat It" | | Thriller | 4:18 |
| 18. | "Wanna Be Startin' Somethin'" (attempted recreation of 7" version) | | Thriller | 4:17 |
| 19. | "Human Nature" (attempted recreation of 7" remix) | Steve Porcaro; John Bettis | Thriller | 3:45 |
| 20. | "P.Y.T. (Pretty Young Thing)" | James Ingram; Quincy Jones | Thriller | 3:59 |
| 21. | "Thriller" (radio edit) | Temperton | Thriller | 5:12 |
| Total length: | | | | 79:35 |

- Tracks 1–3, 7–9 and 14 performed by The Jackson 5/Jacksons.

Disc two
| No. | Title | Writer(s) | Album | Length |
|---|---|---|---|---|
| 1. | "Bad" (7" single mix) | | Bad (1987) | 4:06 |
| 2. | "I Just Can't Stop Loving You" (radio edit) (duet with Siedah Garrett) | | Bad | 4:11 |
| 3. | "Leave Me Alone" | | Bad | 4:39 |
| 4. | "The Way You Make Me Feel" (attempted recreation of 7" remix) | | Bad | 4:26 |
| 5. | "Man in the Mirror" | Siedah Garrett; Glen Ballard | Bad | 5:18 |
| 6. | "Dirty Diana" (single edit) | | Bad | 4:40 |
| 7. | "Another Part of Me" (7" version) | | Bad | 3:46 |
| 8. | "Smooth Criminal" (album version #3) | | Bad | 4:17 |
| 9. | "Black or White" (single version) | Michael Jackson; Bill Bottrell | Dangerous (1991) | 3:21 |
| 10. | "Heal the World" | | Dangerous | 6:24 |
| 11. | "Remember the Time" | Michael Jackson; Teddy Riley; Bernard Belle | Dangerous | 3:59 |
| 12. | "In the Closet" (7" edit) | Michael Jackson; Riley | Dangerous | 4:48 |
| 13. | "Who Is It" (7" edit) | | Dangerous | 3:59 |
| 14. | "Will You Be There" (radio edit) | | Dangerous | 3:40 |
| 15. | "Dangerous" | Michael Jackson; Bottrell; Riley | Dangerous | 6:59 |
| 16. | "You Are Not Alone" (album edit) | R. Kelly | HIStory: Past, Present and Future, Book I (1995) | 4:55 |
| 17. | "You Rock My World" (album edit) | Michael Jackson; Rodney Jerkins; Fred Jerkins III; LaShawn Daniels; Nora Payne | Invincible (2001) | 5:08 |
| Total length: | | | | 79:54 |

Limited-edition 3.0 bonus disc
| No. | Title | Writer(s) | Album | Length |
|---|---|---|---|---|
| 1. | "Can't Get Outta the Rain" (single version) | Michael Jackson; Jones | "The Girl Is Mine" single (1982) | 4:06 |
| 2. | "Say Say Say" (duet with Paul McCartney) | Michael Jackson; McCartney | Pipes of Peace (1983) | 3:55 |
| 3. | "Jam" | Michael Jackson; Moore; Swedien; Riley | Dangerous | 5:38 |
| 4. | "They Don't Care About Us" | | HIStory: Past, Present and Future, Book I | 4:44 |
| 5. | "Blood on the Dance Floor" | Michael Jackson; Riley | Blood on the Dance Floor: HIStory in the Mix (1997) | 4:15 |
| 6. | "Stranger in Moscow" | | HIStory: Past, Present and Future, Book I | 5:45 |
| 7. | "Butterflies" | Andre Harris; Marsha Ambrosius | Invincible | 4:40 |
| Total length: | | | | 33:08 |

=== European and international version ===
Disc one
| No. | Title | Writer(s) | Album | Length |
|---|---|---|---|---|
| 1. | "I Want You Back" | The Corporation | Diana Ross Presents The Jackson 5 | 2:58 |
| 2. | "ABC" | The Corporation | ABC | 2:58 |
| 3. | "The Love You Save" | The Corporation | ABC | 3:05 |
| 4. | "Got to Be There" | Willensky | Got to Be There | 3:25 |
| 5. | "Rockin' Robin" | Thomas | Got to Be There | 2:32 |
| 6. | "Ben" | Scharf; Black | Ben | 2:46 |
| 7. | "Blame It on the Boogie" (edited version) | Jackson-Clark; Jackson-Rich; Kampschroer; Krohn; Meyer | Destiny | 3:30 |
| 8. | "Shake Your Body (Down to the Ground)" (7" version) | Michael Jackson; R. Jackson | Destiny | 3:46 |
| 9. | "Don't Stop 'Til You Get Enough" (7" edit) | | Off the Wall | 3:56 |
| 10. | "Off the Wall" (attempted recreation of US 7" remix) | Temperton | Off the Wall | 3:46 |
| 11. | "Rock with You" (7" remix) | Temperton | Off the Wall | 3:23 |
| 12. | "She's Out of My Life" | Bahler | Off the Wall | 3:37 |
| 13. | "Can You Feel It" (7" edit) | Michael Jackson; Jackie Jackson | Triumph | 3:50 |
| 14. | "The Girl Is Mine" (duet with Paul McCartney) | | Thriller | 3:41 |
| 15. | "Billie Jean" | | Thriller | 4:55 |
| 16. | "Beat It" | | Thriller | 4:18 |
| 17. | "Wanna Be Startin' Somethin'" (attempted recreation of 7" version) | | Thriller | 4:17 |
| 18. | "Human Nature" (attempted recreation of 7" remix) | Porcaro; Bettis | Thriller | 3:45 |
| 19. | "P.Y.T. (Pretty Young Thing)" | Ingram; Jones | Thriller | 3:58 |
| 20. | "I Just Can't Stop Loving You" (radio edit) (duet with Siedah Garrett) | | Bad | 4:11 |
| 21. | "Thriller" (radio edit) | Temperton | Thriller | 5:14 |

- Tracks 1–3, 7–8 and 13 performed by The Jackson 5/Jacksons.

Disc two
| No. | Title | Writer(s) | Album | Length |
|---|---|---|---|---|
| 1. | "Bad" (7" single mix) | | Bad | 4:06 |
| 2. | "The Way You Make Me Feel" (attempted recreation of 7" remix) | | Bad | 4:26 |
| 3. | "Man in the Mirror" | Garrett; Ballard | Bad | 5:18 |
| 4. | "Dirty Diana" (single edit) | | Bad | 4:40 |
| 5. | "Another Part of Me" (7" version) | | Bad | 3:46 |
| 6. | "Smooth Criminal" (album version #3) | | Bad | 4:17 |
| 7. | "Leave Me Alone" | | Bad | 4:39 |
| 8. | "Black or White" (single version) | Michael Jackson; Bottrell | Dangerous | 3:21 |
| 9. | "Remember the Time" | Michael Jackson; Riley; Belle | Dangerous | 3:59 |
| 10. | "In the Closet" (7" edit) | Michael Jackson; Riley | Dangerous | 4:48 |
| 11. | "Who Is It" (7" edit) | | Dangerous | 3:59 |
| 12. | "Heal the World" | | Dangerous | 6:24 |
| 13. | "Will You Be There" (radio edit) | | Dangerous | 3:40 |
| 14. | "You Are Not Alone" (LP edit) | R. Kelly | HIStory: Past, Present and Future, Book I | 4:55 |
| 15. | "Earth Song" (radio edit) | | HIStory: Past, Present and Future, Book I | 5:02 |
| 16. | "They Don't Care About Us" | | HIStory: Past, Present and Future, Book I | 4:44 |
| 17. | "You Rock My World" (album edit) | Jackson; R. Jerkins; F. Jerkins; Daniels; Payne | Invincible | 5:08 |

=== Japanese version ===
Disc one
| No. | Title | Writer(s) | Album | Length |
|---|---|---|---|---|
| 1. | "I Want You Back" | The Corporation | Diana Ross Presents The Jackson 5 | 2:58 |
| 2. | "ABC" | The Corporation | ABC | 2:58 |
| 3. | "The Love You Save" | The Corporation | ABC | 3:05 |
| 4. | "Got to Be There" | Willensky | Got to Be There | 3:25 |
| 5. | "Rockin' Robin" | Thomas | Got to Be There | 2:32 |
| 6. | "Ben" | Scharf; Black | Ben | 2:46 |
| 7. | "Blame It on the Boogie" (edited version) | Jackson-Clark; Jackson-Rich; Kampschroer; Krohn; Meyer | Destiny | 3:30 |
| 8. | "Shake Your Body (Down to the Ground)" (7" version) | Michael Jackson; R. Jackson | Destiny | 3:46 |
| 9. | "Don't Stop 'Til You Get Enough" (7" edit) | | Off the Wall | 3:56 |
| 10. | "Off the Wall" (attempted recreation of US 7" remix) | Temperton | Off the Wall | 3:46 |
| 11. | "Rock with You" (7" remix) | Temperton | Off the Wall | 3:23 |
| 12. | "She's Out of My Life" | Bahler | Off the Wall | 3:37 |
| 13. | "Can You Feel It" (7" edit) | Michael Jackson; Jackie Jackson | Triumph | 3:50 |
| 14. | "The Girl Is Mine" (duet with Paul McCartney) | | Thriller | 3:41 |
| 15. | "Billie Jean" | | Thriller | 4:55 |
| 16. | "Beat It" | | Thriller | 4:18 |
| 17. | "Wanna Be Startin' Somethin'" (attempted recreation of 7" version) | | Thriller | 4:17 |
| 18. | "Human Nature" (attempted recreation of 7" remix) | Porcaro; Bettis | Thriller | 3:45 |
| 19. | "P.Y.T. (Pretty Young Thing)" | Ingram; Jones | Thriller | 3:58 |
| 20. | "I Just Can't Stop Loving You" (radio edit) (duet with Siedah Garrett) | | Bad | 4:11 |
| 21. | "Thriller" (radio edit) | Temperton | Thriller | 5:14 |

- Tracks 1–3, 7–8 and 13 performed by The Jackson 5/Jacksons.

Disc two
| No. | Title | Writer(s) | Album | Length |
|---|---|---|---|---|
| 1. | "Bad" (7" single mix) | | Bad | 4:06 |
| 2. | "The Way You Make Me Feel" (attempted recreation of 7" remix) | | Bad | 4:26 |
| 3. | "Man in the Mirror" | Garrett; Ballard | Bad | 5:18 |
| 4. | "Dirty Diana" (single edit) | | Bad | 4:40 |
| 5. | "Another Part of Me" (7" version) | | Bad | 3:46 |
| 6. | "Smooth Criminal" (album version #3) | | Bad | 4:17 |
| 7. | "Leave Me Alone" | | Bad | 4:39 |
| 8. | "Black or White" (single version) | Michael Jackson; Bottrell | Dangerous | 3:21 |
| 9. | "Remember the Time" | Michael Jackson; Riley; Belle | Dangerous | 3:59 |
| 10. | "In the Closet" (7" edit) | Michael Jackson; Riley | Dangerous | 4:48 |
| 11. | "Who Is It" (7" edit) | | Dangerous | 3:59 |
| 12. | "Heal the World" | | Dangerous | 6:24 |
| 13. | "Will You Be There" (radio edit) | | Dangerous | 3:40 |
| 14. | "You Are Not Alone" (album edit) | R. Kelly | HIStory: Past, Present and Future, Book I | 4:55 |
| 15. | "Blood on the Dance Floor" | Michael Jackson; Riley | Blood on the Dance Floor: HIStory in the Mix | 4:15 |
| 16. | "One More Chance" | R. Kelly | Number Ones (2003) | 3:49 |
| 17. | "You Rock My World" (album edit) | Jackson; R. Jerkins; F. Jerkins; Daniels; Payne | Invincible | 5:08 |

=== Qobuz.com Studio Masters (digital version; 24bit/96kHz) ===
Disc one
| No. | Title | Writer(s) | Length |
|---|---|---|---|
| 1. | "I Want You Back" | The Corporation | 2:58 |
| 2. | "ABC" | The Corporation | 2:58 |
| 3. | "The Love You Save" | The Corporation | 3:04 |
| 4. | "Got to Be There" | Willensky | 3:23 |
| 5. | "Rockin' Robin" | Thomas | 2:32 |
| 6. | "Ben" | Scharf, Black | 2:46 |
| 7. | "Enjoy Yourself" | Gamble, Huff | 3:25 |
| 8. | "Blame It on the Boogie" | Jackson-Clark, Jackson-Rich, Kampschroer, Krohn, Meyer | 3:30 |
| 9. | "Shake Your Body (Down to the Ground)" (7" version) | Michael Jackson, R. Jackson | 3:46 |
| 10. | "Don't Stop 'Til You Get Enough" | | 6:04 |
| 11. | "Rock with You" (7" remix) | Temperton | 3:23 |
| 12. | "Off the Wall" (UK 7" remix – edited version) | Temperton | 3:46 |
| 13. | "She's Out of My Life" | Bahler | 3:37 |
| 14. | "Can You Feel It" (7" edit) | Michael Jackson, J. Jackson | 3:50 |
| 15. | "The Girl Is Mine" (duet with Paul McCartney) | | 3:42 |
| 16. | "Billie Jean" | | 4:56 |
| 17. | "Beat It" | | 4:19 |
| 18. | "Wanna Be Startin' Somethin'" (7" version) | | 4:20 |
| 19. | "Human Nature" (7" remix) | Porcaro, Bettis | 3:47 |
| 20. | "P.Y.T. (Pretty Young Thing)" | Ingram, Jones | 3:59 |
| 21. | "Thriller" (radio edit) | Temperton | 5:12 |

- Tracks 1–3, 7–9 and 14 performed by The Jackson 5/Jacksons.

Disc two
| No. | Title | Writer(s) | Length |
|---|---|---|---|
| 1. | "Bad" (7" single mix) | | 4:06 |
| 2. | "I Just Can't Stop Loving You" (radio edit) (duet with Siedah Garrett) | | 4:11 |
| 3. | "Leave Me Alone" | | 4:39 |
| 4. | "The Way You Make Me Feel" (7" remix) | | 4:26 |
| 5. | "Man in the Mirror" | Garrett, Ballard | 5:18 |
| 6. | "Dirty Diana" (single edit) | | 4:40 |
| 7. | "Another Part of Me" (7" version) | | 3:46 |
| 8. | "Smooth Criminal" (album version #3) | | 4:17 |
| 9. | "Black or White" | Michael Jackson; rap lyrics by Bottrell | 4:16 |
| 10. | "Heal the World" | | 6:24 |
| 11. | "Remember the Time" | Michael Jackson, Riley, Belle | 3:59 |
| 12. | "In the Closet" (7" edit) | Michael Jackson, Riley | 4:48 |
| 13. | "Who Is It" (7" edit) | | 3:59 |
| 14. | "Will You Be There" (radio edit with string intro) | | 3:40 |
| 15. | "Dangerous" | Michael Jackson, Bottrell, Riley | 6:59 |
| 16. | "You Are Not Alone" (album edit) | R. Kelly | 4:55 |
| 17. | "You Rock My World" (album edit) | Michael Jackson, Jerkins, Jerkins III, Daniels, Payne | 5:08 |

- All attempted recreation of single edits are restored to actual single versions on digital edition with the exception of "Off the Wall", which is a further edit of UK 7" remix and "Will You Be There", which is a radio edit with newly added string intro. Both versions are exclusive to this release.
- "Enjoy Yourself", "Blame It on the Boogie", "Don't Stop 'Til You Get Enough", and "Black or White" are restored to their album length on the digital edition.
- The uncut version of "The Lady in My Life" was announced on Legacy Recordings' website to be released on 2008's 3.0 edition bonus disc, but eventually omitted for unknown reasons. However, this version is previously available on the 2002 compilation The Songs of Rod Temperton, which has become a much sought-after item among Jackson collectors upon release, despite the fact that the version on the compilation is an inferior tape transfer with heavy, irreparable distortion due to tape degradation.
- A UK-exclusive edition of this compilation was renamed as The Hits (with the same font as the five-album box set The Collection) and given a colorized version of the cover in 2009.

== Charts ==
=== Weekly charts ===
Weekly chart performance for The Essential Michael Jackson
| Chart (2005–2026) | Peak position |
|---|---|
| Australian Albums (ARIA) | 1 |
| Austrian Albums (Ö3 Austria) | 8 |
| Belgian Albums (Ultratop Flanders) | 4 |
| Belgian Albums (Ultratop Wallonia) | 1 |
| Canadian Albums (Billboard) | 4 |
| Croatian International Albums (HDU) | 29 |
| Czech Albums (IFPI) | 3 |
| Danish Albums (Hitlisten) | 6 |
| Dutch Albums (Album Top 100) | 19 |
| Finnish Albums (Suomen virallinen lista) | 1 |
| French Albums (SNEP) | 81 |
| German Albums (Offizielle Top 100) | 10 |
| Greek Albums (IFPI) | 20 |
| Hungarian Albums (MAHASZ) | 1 |
| Icelandic Albums (Tónlistinn) | 9 |
| Irish Albums (IRMA) | 1 |
| Italian Albums (FIMI) | 5 |
| Mexican Albums (AMPROFON) | 1 |
| New Zealand Albums (RMNZ) | 1 |
| Norwegian Albums (VG-lista) | 3 |
| Polish Albums (ZPAV) | 5 |
| Portuguese Albums (AFP) | 3 |
| Slovenian Albums (IFPI) | 24 |
| Spanish Albums (Promusicae) | 23 |
| Swedish Albums (Sverigetopplistan) | 3 |
| Swiss Albums (Schweizer Hitparade) | 2 |
| UK Albums (Official Charts) | 1 |
| US Billboard 200 | 31 |
| US Top Catalog Albums (Billboard) | 1 |

=== Year-end charts ===
Year-end chart performance for The Essential Michael Jackson
| Chart (2005) | Position |
|---|---|
| Australian Albums (ARIA) | 69 |
| Belgian Albums (Ultratop Flanders) | 58 |
| Belgian Albums (Ultratop Wallonia) | 37 |
| Swedish Albums (Sverigetopplistan) | 52 |
| Swiss Albums (Schweizer Hitparade) | 87 |
| UK Albums (OCC) | 88 |
| Chart (2009) | Position |
| Australian Albums (ARIA) | 8 |
| Swedish Albums (Sverigetopplistan) | 22 |
| UK Albums (OCC) | 12 |
| US Billboard Comprehensive Albums | 22 |
| Chart (2010) | Position |
| Australian Albums (ARIA) | 63 |
| US Billboard 200 | 112 |
| Chart (2014) | Position |
| Australian Albums (ARIA) | 93 |
| Chart (2015) | Position |
| Australian Albums (ARIA) | 81 |
| US Billboard 200 | 174 |
| Chart (2016) | Position |
| Australian Albums (ARIA) | 77 |
| Australian Catalogue Album Chart | 10 |
| Chart (2017) | Position |
| Australian Albums (ARIA) | 96 |
| US Billboard 200 | 126 |
| US Top R&B/Hip-Hop Albums (Billboard) | 73 |
| Chart (2018) | Position |
| US Billboard 200 | 105 |
| US Top R&B/Hip-Hop Albums (Billboard) | 51 |
| Chart (2019) | Position |
| US Billboard 200 | 101 |
| Chart (2020) | Position |
| US Billboard 200 | 149 |
| Chart (2021) | Position |
| US Billboard 200 | 163 |
| Chart (2022) | Position |
| US Billboard 200 | 145 |
| Chart (2023) | Position |
| UK Albums (OCC) | 25 |
| US Billboard 200 | 141 |
| US Top R&B/Hip-Hop Albums (Billboard) | 86 |
| Chart (2024) | Position |
| UK Albums (OCC) | 16 |
| US Billboard 200 | 130 |
| US Top R&B/Hip-Hop Albums (Billboard) | 44 |
| Chart (2025) | Position |
| UK Albums (OCC) | 14 |
| US Billboard 200 | 127 |
| US Top R&B/Hip-Hop Albums (Billboard) | 41 |

=== Decade-end charts ===
Decade-end chart performance for The Essential Michael Jackson
| Chart (2000–2009) | Position |
|---|---|
| Australian Albums (ARIA) | 76 |
| Chart (2010–2019) | Position |
| Australian Albums (ARIA) | 80 |

== Certifications and sales ==
Certifications and sales for The Essential Michael Jackson
| Region | Certification | Certified units/sales |
|---|---|---|
| Australia (ARIA) | 9× Platinum | 630,000^{‡} |
| Belgium (BRMA) | Gold | 25,000^{*} |
| Denmark (IFPI Danmark) | 3× Platinum | 60,000^{‡} |
| Finland (Musiikkituottajat) | Gold | 20,290 |
| France (SNEP) | 2× Gold | 200,000^{*} |
| Hungary (MAHASZ) | Gold | 5,000^{^} |
| Ireland (IRMA) | Platinum | 15,000^{^} |
| Italy (FIMI) sales since 2009 | Platinum | 60,000^{*} |
| Japan (RIAJ) | Gold | 100,000^{^} |
| Mexico (AMPROFON) | Platinum | 100,000^{^} |
| New Zealand (RMNZ) | 4× Platinum | 60,000^{‡} |
| Sweden (GLF) | Gold | 30,000^{^} |
| Taiwan | — | 30,000 (Note: 2009 year-end sales, according to Taiwan Institute of Economic Research.) |
| United Kingdom (BPI) | 8× Platinum | 2,400,000^{‡} |
| United States (RIAA) | 5× Platinum | 2,500,000^{‡} |
Summaries
| Europe (IFPI) | 2× Platinum | 2,000,000^{*} |
| Worldwide | — | 6,000,000 |
^{*} Sales figures based on certification alone.^{^} Shipments figures based on certification alone.^{‡} Sales+streaming figures based on certification alone.

== See also ==
- List of number-one albums of 2009 (Australia)
- List of number-one albums of 2009 (Mexico)
- List of number-one albums from the 2000s (UK)
- List of number-one R&B albums of 2009 (UK)
