= Hello World: The Motown Solo Collection =

Box set by Michael Jackson
- Released: September 1, 2009
- Recorded: September 1969 – December 1974: 1984 (overdubs on Disc 3 tracks 16–24)
- Length: 233:02
- Labels: Hip-O Select; Motown
- Producer: Various

Michael Jackson chronology
The Definitive Collection (2009)	Hello World: The Motown Solo Collection (2009)	The Remix Suite (2009)

Professional ratings
Review scores
Source	Rating
AllMusic	3.5/5 stars

Hello World: The Motown Solo Collection is a 71-track triple disc box set commemorating Michael Jackson's early years with Motown. The album features Jackson's four solo LPs from Motown (dating from 1971 to 1975), plus songs that were released after he left the label.

== Release dates ==
On June 12, 2009, less than two weeks before Jackson's death, Universal Music Group reissue label Hip-O Select announced on its Twitter page that the 3-CD set was available for pre-ordering, with an announced shipping date of July 3.

== Track listing ==
=== Disc 1 ===
No.	Title	Writer(s)	Length
1.	"Ain't No Sunshine"	Bill Withers	4:09
2.	"I Wanna Be Where You Are"	Leon Ware; Arthur "T-Bone" Ross	3:01
3.	"Girl Don't Take Your Love from Me"	Willie Hutch	3:46
4.	"In Our Small Way"	Beatrice Verdi; Christine Yarian	3:34
5.	"Got to Be There"	Elliot Willensky	3:23
6.	"Rockin' Robin"	Jimmie Thomas	2:31
7.	"Wings of My Love"	The Corporation	3:32
8.	"Maria (You Were the Only One)"	Lawrence Brown; Linda Glover; George Gordy; Allen Story	3:41
9.	"Love Is Here and Now You're Gone"	Holland-Dozier-Holland	2:51
10.	"You've Got a Friend"	Carole King	4:53
11.	"Ben"	Don Black; Walter Scharf	2:44
12.	"The Greatest Show on Earth"	Mel Larson; Jerry Marcellino	2:48
13.	"People Make the World Go Round"	Thom Bell; Linda Creed	3:15
14.	"We've Got a Good Thing Going"	The Corporation	2:59
15.	"Everybody's Somebody's Fool"	Gladys Hampton; Regina Adams; Ace Adams	2:59
16.	"My Girl"	Smokey Robinson; Ronald White	3:08
17.	"What Goes Around Comes Around"	Allen Levinsky; Arthur Stokes; Dana Meyer; Floyd Weatherspoon	3:33
18.	"In Our Small Way"	Beatrice Verdi; Christine Yarian	3:39
19.	"Shoo-Be-Doo-Be-Doo-Da-Day"	Henry Cosby; Sylvia Moy; Stevie Wonder	3:21
20.	"You Can Cry on My Shoulder"	Berry Gordy	2:39
21.	"Don't Let It Get You Down" (original mix)	Mel Larson; Jerry Marcellino; Deke Richards	2:50
22.	"You've Really Got a Hold on Me" (original mix)	Smokey Robinson; White; Rogers	3:24
23.	"Melodie" (original mix)	Mel Larson; Jerry Marcellino; Deke Richards	3:08
24.	"Touch the One You Love" (original mix)	Wayne; Clinton	2:50

- Tracks 1–10 from the album Got to Be There
- Tracks 11–20 from the album Ben
  - Track 18 contains a studio countdown not released on the original album.
- Tracks 21 and 23 originally released on Anthology: The Best of Michael Jackson

=== Disc 2 ===
No.	Title	Writer(s)	Length
1.	"With a Child's Heart"	Vicky Basemore; Henry Cosby; Sylvia Moy	3:29
2.	"Up Again"	Freddie Perren; Christine Yarian	2:50
3.	"All the Things You Are"	Oscar Hammerstein II; Jerome Kern	2:59
4.	"Happy" (Love Theme from Lady Sings the Blues)	Michel Legrand; Smokey Robinson	3:25
5.	"Too Young"	Sidney Lippman; Sylvia Dee	3:38
6.	"Doggin' Around"	Lena Agree	2:52
7.	"Johnny Raven"	Billy Page	3:33
8.	"Euphoria"	Leon Ware; Jacqueline D. Hilliard	2:50
9.	"Morning Glow"	Stephen Schwartz	3:37
10.	"Music and Me"	Mike Cannon; Don Fenceton; Mel Larson; Jerry Marcellino	2:38
11.	"We're Almost There"	Eddie Holland; Brian Holland	3:42
12.	"Take Me Back"	Eddie Holland; Brian Holland	3:24
13.	"One Day in Your Life"	Sam Brown III; Renée Armand	4:15
14.	"Cinderella Stay Awhile"	Mack David; Michael Burnett Sutton	3:08
15.	"We've Got Forever"	Mack David; Elliot Willensky	3:10
16.	"Just a Little Bit of You"	Eddie Holland; Brian Holland	3:10
17.	"You Are There"	Sam Brown III; Randy Meitzenheimer; Christine Yarian	3:21
18.	"Dapper Dan"	Hal Davis; Royce Esters; Don Fletcher	3:11
19.	"Dear Michael"	Hal Davis; Elliot Willensky	2:35
20.	"I'll Come Home to You"	Freddie Perren; Christine Yarian	3:02
21.	"Girl You're So Together" (original mix)	Keni St. Lewis	2:59
22.	"Farewell My Summer Love" (original mix)	Keni St. Lewis	3:37
23.	"Call on Me" (original mix)	Fonce Mizell; Larry Mizell	3:21

- Tracks 1–10 from the album Music & Me
  - The track order of 7–9 is different from the original release.
- Tracks 11–20 from the album Forever, Michael
- Track 21 and 22 originally released on the compilation Farewell My Summer Love
- Track 23 originally released on Anthology: The Best of Michael Jackson

=== Disc 3 ===
No.	Title	Writer(s)	Length
1.	"When I Come of Age"	Weldon Dean Parks; Don Fletcher; Hal Davis	2:37
2.	"Teenage Symphony"	Gloria Jones; Hal Davis; Marilyn McLeod	2:45
3.	"I Hear a Symphony"	Holland-Dozier-Holland	3:01
4.	"Give Me Half a Chance"	Clifton Davis	3:26
5.	"Love's Gone Bad"	Holland-Dozier-Holland	3:08
6.	"Lonely Teardrops"	Berry Gordy; Gwen Gordy; Tyran Carlo	2:40
7.	"You're Good for Me"	Eddie Horan	3:15
8.	"That's What Love Is Made Of"	Robert Rogers; William Robinson; Warren Moore	3:24
9.	"I Like You the Way You Are (Don't Change Your Love on Me)"	Willie Hutch	2:57
10.	"Who's Lookin' for a Lover"	Jacqueline D. Hilliard; Leon Ware	2:50
11.	"I Was Made to Love Her"	Henry Cosby; Lula Hardaway; Sylvia Moy; Stevie Wonder	3:20
12.	"If'n I Was God"	Robert Sherman; Richard Sherman	3:02
13.	"To Make My Father Proud" (original mix)	Bob Crewe; Larry Weiss	4:11
14.	"Here I Am (Come and Take Me)" (original mix)	Al Green; Teenie Hodges	2:45
15.	"Twenty-Five Miles" (original mix)	Green; Hodges	3:18
16.	"Don't Let It Get You Down"	Mel Larson; Jerry Marcellino; Deke Richards	3:02
17.	"You've Really Got a Hold on Me"	Smokey Robinson	3:30
18.	"Melodie"	Mel Larson; Jerry Marcellino; Deke Richards	3:24
19.	"Touch the One You Love"	Artie Wayne; George S. Clinton	2:48
20.	"Girl You're So Together"	Keni St. Lewis	3:12
21.	"Farewell My Summer Love"	Keni St. Lewis	4:24
22.	"Call on Me"	Fonce Mizell; Larry Mizell	3:39
23.	"Here I Am (Come and Take Me)"	Al Green; Teenie Hodges	2:56
24.	"To Make My Father Proud"	Bob Crewe; Larry Weiss	4:04

- Tracks 1–12 from the compilation Looking Back to Yesterday
- Track 15 released in remixed form on The Original Soul of Michael Jackson
- Tracks 16–24 from the compilation Farewell My Summer Love
