= The Remix Suite =

Remix album by Michael Jackson
- Released: October 17, 2009
- Recorded: July 1969 – March 1975: 2009 (overdubbing, remixing)
- Genres: Hip hop; R&B; dance-pop; house; space disco
- Length: 18:21 (I); 29:35 (II); 17:53 (III); 19:25 (IV); 49:50 (US); 76:52 (UK)
- Label: Universal Motown

Michael Jackson chronology
Hello World: The Motown Solo Collection (2009)	The Remix Suite (2009)	Michael Jackson's This Is It (2009)

Professional ratings
Review scores
Source	Rating
The A.V. Club	(C)
Rolling Stone	2.5/5 stars

The Remix Suite (digital title: Michael Jackson: The Remix Suite) is a compilation of remixed hits by singer Michael Jackson. Although labeled as a Michael Jackson release, the majority of remixes are of hits during his tenure with the Jackson 5. Starting from August 25, five remixes each were released digitally as "suites" via iTunes, AmazonMP3 and Rhapsody every two weeks. It is the fifth album to be released since Jackson's death. The first suite leaked online two weeks before its intended digital release.

== Track listings ==
Below are tracks from the two editions of the CD, and then the tracks from the EPs, numbered according to suite number.

US	UK	AUS	JAP	EP	Song	Length
1	1	1	1	1.1	"Skywriter" (Stargate Remix)	4:05
2	6	2	2	1.2	"Never Can Say Goodbye" (Neptunes Remix)	3:17
3	2	3	3	1.4	"I Wanna Be Where You Are" (Dallas Austin Remix)	4:14
4	4	4	4	1.3	"Dancing Machine" (Polow da Don Remix)	3:16
5	5	5	5	1.5	"ABC" (Salaam Remi Remix)	3:29
6	7	6	6	2.1	"Forever Came Today" (Frankie Knuckles "Directors Cut Late Night Antics" Remix)	7:38
7	9	7	7	2.2	"Dancing Machine" (Steve Aoki Remix)	4:40
8	10	8	8	2.3	"Hum Along and Dance" (Morales Giamsta Remix)	5:48
9	14	9	9	3.1	"Ain't No Sunshine" (Benny Blanco Remix)	3:08
10	15	10	10	3.2	"Maria (You Were the Only One)" (Emile Haynie Remix)	3:52
11	16	11	11	3.4	"Maybe Tomorrow" (Carl Sturken and Evan Rogers Remix)	3:09
12	18	12	12	3.5	"Ben" (Konvict Remix)	3:28
	3				"I Want You Back" (Element Remix)	3:04
	8			4.1	"I Want You Back" (Kenny Hayes Sunshine Funk Remix)	4:31
	11				"ABC" (Verde Remix Edit)	3:38
	12			2.4	"I Want You Back" (Dimitri from Paris Supa Funk Brakes Remix)	6:08
	13			2.5	"Dancing Machine" (Paul Oakenfold Remix)	5:24
	17			3.3	"Who's Lovin' You" (No ID Remix)	4:16
				4.2	"ABC" (Mark Hoppus-Chris Holmes Remix)	3:15
			13	4.3	"Darling Dear" (Rejuvenated by Muro Remix)	4:36
				4.4	"The Love You Save" (DJ Cassidy Remix)	3:25
				4.5	"I'll Be There" (Wayne Wilkins Remix)	3:41
		13			"Dancing Machine" (Dave Audé vs. Havana Brown Remix)	8:09

Promo only mixes

- "I Want You Back" (Blame Remix—Radio Edit) – 3:30
- "ABC" (Verde Remix) – 5:37

== Unreleased remixes ==
The compilation, when news was originally released, was titled The Remix Suites: I–V, as a fifth EP was scheduled for release October 20, with the physical release a week later on the 27th.

== Release dates ==
Suite	Date
I	August 25, 2009
II	September 8, 2009
III	September 22, 2009
IV	October 6, 2009
CD collection	October 20, 2009
