= Anthology (Michael Jackson album) =

Compilation album by Michael Jackson
- Released: November 14, 1986
- Recorded: 1969–1974
- Label: Motown
- Producer: The Corporation; Hal Davis

Michael Jackson chronology
Looking Back to Yesterday (1986)	Anthology (1986)	Bad (1987)

Alternative covers
- 1995 double CD reissue

Alternative cover
- 2008 Gold reissue

Professional ratings
Review scores
Source	Rating
AllMusic	4.5/5 stars

Anthology is a compilation of Motown hits by pop and R&B singer Michael Jackson with additional hits by The Jackson 5, as well as rare material from 1973. The album was originally released in the United States on November 14, 1986.

It was re-released on November 8, 1995 with alternate versions of some of the songs, and has sold three million copies worldwide.

On August 26, 2008, in celebration of Jackson's 50th birthday (less than a year before his death), Anthology was re-released under Universal Music's Gold series.

== Track listing ==
Tracks with an asterisk represent their original undubbed renditions.

1986 double CD	1995 double CD	2008 double CD	Song	Length
1.01	1.01	1.01	"Got to Be There"	3:24
1.02	1.02	1.03	"Rockin' Robin"	2:32
1.03	1.03	1.04	"Ain't No Sunshine"	4:10
1.04	1.04	1.02	"Maria (You Were the Only One)"	3:40
1.05	1.05	1.05	"I Wanna Be Where You Are"	2:56
1.06	1.06	1.06	"Girl Don't Take Your Love from Me"	3:47
1.07	1.07		"Love Is Here and Now You're Gone"	2:51
1.08	1.08	1.07	"Ben"	3:45
1.09	1.09	1.08	"People Make the World Go 'Round"	3:03
1.10	1.10	1.09	"Shoo-Be-Doo-Be-Doo-Da-Day"	3:13
1.11	1.11	2.01	"With a Child's Heart"	3:32
1.12	1.12		"Everybody's Somebody's Fool"	2:58
1.13	1.15		"In Our Small Way"	3:38
1.14	1.16		"All the Things You Are"	2:55
1.15	1.17		"You Can Cry on My Shoulder"	2:32
1.16	1.18	1.16	"Maybe Tomorrow" (J5)	4:39
1.17	1.19		"I'll Be There" (J5)	3:57
1.18	1.20	1.15	"Never Can Say Goodbye" (J5)	2:59
1.19	1.21	2.13	"It's Too Late to Change the Time" (J5)	3:55
1.20	1.22		"Dancing Machine" (J5)	3:18
2.01	2.01	1.11	"When I Come of Age"	2:41
2.02	2.02	2.07	"Dear Michael"	2:31
2.03	2.03	2.04	"Music and Me"	2:36
2.04	2.04		"You Are There"	3:23
2.05	2.05	2.11	"One Day In Your Life"	4:16
2.06	2.07*		"Love's Gone Bad" (Original 1972 Mix) (Recorded February 1972)	3:10/3:55*
2.07	2.08		"That's What Love Is Made Of"	3:24
2.08	2.09	2.10	"Who's Looking for a Lover"	2:51
2.09	2.10		"Lonely Teardrops"	2:41
2.10	2.12	2.05	"We're Almost There"	3:43
2.11	2.13		"Take Me Back"	3:22
2.12	2.14	2.06	"Just a Little Bit of You"	3:08
2.13	2.15*	2.15	"Melodie" (Original Version)	3:24/3:08*
2.14	2.16	2.08	"I'll Come Home to You"	3:02
2.15	2.17*	2.09	"If'n I Was God"	3:04/4:06*
2.16	2.18	2.02	"Happy (Love Theme from Lady Sings the Blues)"	3:26
2.17	2.19*		"Don't Let It Get You Down" (Original Version)	2:58/2:48*
2.18	2.20*	2.14	"Call on Me" (Original Version)	3:39/3:22*
2.19	2.21*		"To Make My Father Proud" (Original Version)	3:39/4:05*
2.20	2.22*	2.16*	"Farewell My Summer Love" (Original Version)	4:24/3:37*
	1.13		"Greatest Show on Earth"	2:50
	1.14	1.10	"We've Got a Good Thing Going"	3:03
	2.06		"Make Tonight All Mine" (Original 1973 Mix) (Recorded July 1973) (J5)	3:19
	2.11		"Cinderella Stay Awhile"	3:11
		1.12	"I Want You Back" (J5)	3:00
		1.13	"Who's Lovin' You" (J5)	4:22
		1.14	"Darling Dear" (J5)	2:39
		2.03	"Morning Glow"	3:38
		2.12	"You're My Best Friend, My Love" (J5)	3:24
