= Maybe Tomorrow (The Jackson 5 song) =

1971 single by the Jackson 5

Single by the Jackson 5

from the album Maybe Tomorrow
- B-side: "I Will Find a Way"
- Released: June 22, 1971
- Recorded: February 1971
- Studio: The Sound Factory (West Hollywood, California)
- Genre: Pop
- Length: 4:46
- Label: Motown
- Songwriter: The Corporation
- Producer: The Corporation

The Jackson 5 singles chronology
"Never Can Say Goodbye" (1971)	"Maybe Tomorrow" (1971)	"Sugar Daddy" (1971)

"Maybe Tomorrow" is a song by American pop band the Jackson 5, in 1971. "Maybe Tomorrow" was included on the Jackson 5's album Maybe Tomorrow, and was also featured on Goin' Back to Indiana. The song was released again in 2009 via a Carl Sturken and Evan Rogers' remix, with an orchestral arrangement by Rob Mounsey, from a compilation album The Remix Suite.

The song peaked at number 3 on the Billboard Hot R&B Singles chart, and at number 20 on the Billboard Hot 100.

Cash Box said of it that the "group's delightful harmonies and a teasing rhythm section put a sparkling gloss into" the song.

== Personnel ==
- Lead vocals by Michael Jackson
- Background vocals by Jermaine Jackson, Marlon Jackson, Jackie Jackson, Tito Jackson

Instruments

- Bass Guitar by Wilton Felder or Alphonzo Mizell
- Guitars by Don Peake, Louis Shelton and Deke Richards
- Drums by Gene Pello or James Gadson
- Piano by Joe Sample
- Orchestral Conduction and Arrangement by Gene Page
- Other instruments by Los Angeles session musicians.

== Charts ==
Chart (1971)	Peak position
U.S. Billboard Hot 100	20
U.S. Billboard Best Selling Soul Singles	3

== UB40 version ==
English reggae band UB40 recorded a reggae-style cover version of the song in 1987. This was released as a single, peaking at #14 in the UK Singles Chart and #3 in the Netherlands, and appeared on their compilation album The Best of UB40 – Volume One, released the same year.

Certifications and sales for UB40 version
Region	Certification	Certified units/sales
New Zealand (RMNZ)	Platinum	30,000^{‡}
^{‡} Sales+streaming figures based on certification alone.

== Samples ==
- The Jackson 5 recording was later sampled by rapper Ghostface Killah on his 1996 song "All That I Got Is You".
