= We've Got a Good Thing Going =

Song by Michael Jackson

from the album Ben
- A-side: "I Wanna Be Where You Are"
- Released: May 2, 1972
- Length: 2:59
- Label: Motown
- Songwriter: The Corporation
- Producer: The Corporation

"We've Got a Good Thing Going" is a song written by The Corporation and originally performed by Michael Jackson. Appearing on the B-side of Jackson's 1972 single "I Wanna Be Where You Are", it was later included on his second album, Ben. In 1981, Jamaican reggae singer Sugar Minott scored his biggest hit with a cover version of the song, reaching number 4 on the UK Singles Chart.

"Die in Your Arms" by Canadian singer Justin Bieber samples the song.

== Later versions ==
British pop singer Yazz recorded a version of the song in 1996 that reached number 53 on the UK Singles Chart.

EastEnders actor-turned-singer Sid Owen had a number 14 hit in the UK with the song in 2000.
