= Got to Be There =

Studio album by Michael Jackson
- Released: January 24, 1972
- Recorded: June–December 1971
- Genre: Pop; R&B
- Length: 35:45
- Label: Motown
- Producer: Berry Gordy (exec.); Hal Davis; The Corporation; Willie Hutch

Michael Jackson chronology
Got to Be There (1972)	Ben (1972)

Singles from Got to Be There
- 1. "Got to Be There" Released: October 7, 1971; 2. "Rockin' Robin" Released: February 17, 1972; 3. "I Wanna Be Where You Are" Released: May 2, 1972; 4. "Ain't No Sunshine" Released: July 3, 1972; 5. "You've Got a Friend" Released: 1972 (Turkey and Venezuela)

Got to Be There is the debut solo studio album by American singer Michael Jackson, released by Motown on January 24, 1972, four weeks after the Jackson 5's Greatest Hits (1971). It includes the song of the same name, which was released on October 7, 1971, as Jackson's debut solo single.

On August 2, 2013, the album was certified Gold by the Recording Industry Association of America (RIAA) for sales of over 500,000 copies. The album was later remastered and reissued in 2009 as part of the 3-disc compilation Hello World: The Motown Solo Collection.

== Background ==
The album was arranged by The Corporation, Eddy Manson, James Anthony Carmichael, Gene Page, and Dave Blumberg. Berry Gordy served as Got to Be There's executive producer, while Jim Britt was credited for photography. The album included remakes of Bill Withers' "Ain't No Sunshine", Carole King's "You've Got a Friend" and The Supremes' "Love Is Here and Now You're Gone". The album's songs have a tempo ranging from 74 beats per minute on "Ain't No Sunshine" to 170 on "Rockin' Robin."

== Promotion ==
The title track and "Rockin' Robin," a Bobby Day cover, were released as Got to Be There's first two singles and became back-to-back hits on the US Billboard Hot 100 at number four and number two, respectively. Third single "I Wanna Be Where You Are" peaked at number 16 on the same chart on June 24, 1972. In the United Kingdom, Jackson's version of Withers's "Ain't No Sunshine" was issued as the album's third single. It reached number 8 on the UK Singles Chart.

== Critical reception ==
Professional ratings
Review scores
Source	Rating
AllMusic	2.5/5 stars
Entertainment Weekly	B+

Writing for Rolling Stone in 1972, the magazine described the album as "slick, artful and every bit as good as the regular The Jackson 5 product," praising Jackson's "sweetly touching voice" and "utter professionalism." In a retrospective review for AllMusic, Rob Theakston rated the album two and a half out of five stars, noting that while the record is "wildly erratic" as a cohesive work, Jackson's covers of "You've Got a Friend" and "Ain't No Sunshine" effectively demonstrate his versatility as a singer. Leah Greenblatt of Entertainment Weekly gave the album a B+ grade, highlighting the "jaunty" cover of "Rockin' Robin", the "wistful" title track, and the "soaring" "I Wanna Be Where You Are".

== Commercial performance ==
Got to Be There peaked at number 14 on the US Billboard 200 and number three on the Top R&B/Hip-Hop Albums chart upon its release. On August 2, 2013, over forty years after its original release, it was certified Gold by the Recording Industry Association of America (RIAA) for sales of over 500,000 copies. In 2009, the album was remastered and reissued as part of the three-disc compilation Hello World: The Motown Solo Collection.

Got to Be There sold over 750,000 copies within the first three weeks of its release, and reached one million copies sold in the US by the end of 1972. The album has sold more than 1.5 million copies worldwide.

== Track listing ==
Side one
No.	Title	Writer(s)	Recorded	Length
1.	"Ain't No Sunshine"	Bill Withers	November 1971	4:09
2.	"I Wanna Be Where You Are"	Arthur "T-Boy" Ross; Leon Ware	November 1971	3:00
3.	"Girl Don't Take Your Love from Me"	Willie Hutch	November 1971	3:46
4.	"In Our Small Way"	Beatrice Verdi; Christine Yarian	December 1971	3:34
5.	"Got to Be There"	Elliot Willensky	June – July 1971	3:23

Side two
No.	Title	Writer(s)	Recorded	Length
1.	"Rockin' Robin"	Jimmie Thomas	October 1971	2:30
2.	"Wings of My Love"	The Corporation	November 1971	3:32
3.	"Maria (You Were the Only One)"	Lawrence Brown; Linda Glover; George Gordy; Allen Story	July – September 1971	3:41
4.	"Love Is Here and Now You're Gone"	Holland-Dozier-Holland	December 1971	2:51
5.	"You've Got a Friend"	Carole King	November 1971	4:45

== Charts ==
Weekly chart performance for Got to Be There
Chart (1972)	Peak position
French Albums (SNEP)	121
UK Albums (OCC)	37
US Billboard 200	14
US Top R&B/Hip-Hop Albums (Billboard)	3

== Certifications ==
Certifications for Got to Be There
Region	Certification	Certified units/sales
United States (RIAA)	Gold	750,000
