= Ben (Michael Jackson album) =

Studio album by Michael Jackson
- Released: August 4, 1972
- Recorded: November 1971 – February 1972
- Genres: Pop; R&B
- Length: 31:31
- Label: Motown
- Producers: Berry Gordy (exec.); Hal Davis; The Corporation; Mel Larson; Jerry Marcellino

Michael Jackson chronology
Got to Be There (1972)	Ben (1972)	Music & Me (1973)

Singles from Ben
- 1. "Ben" Released: July 12, 1972

Ben is the second studio album by the American singer Michael Jackson, released by Motown on August 4, 1972, while Jackson was still a member of the Jackson 5. It received mixed reviews from contemporary music critics. Ben, however, was more successful on the music charts than Jackson's previous studio album, peaking within the top 10 on the Billboard 200 in the United States. Internationally, the album was less successful, peaking at number 12 in Canada, while charting within the top 200 positions in Australia and France.

The album released one single, the title track "Ben", which was a commercial success on the music charts, topping both the US Billboard Hot 100 and the Australian ARIA charts, giving Jackson his first number-one single domestically and internationally. "Ben" also charted within the top 10 in other territories worldwide. "Everybody's Somebody's Fool" was planned to be released as the second single from the album, but was cancelled for unspecified reasons. Two of the album's songs were "stripped" in 2009 as part of the three-disc compilation Hello World: The Motown Solo Collection.

== Background ==
In January 1972, while still a member of the Jackson 5, Jackson released his first studio album, Got to Be There, under Motown Records. The album received generally mixed reviews from contemporary music critics, but was commercially successful worldwide. The album's three singles had a good chart performance on the Billboard Hot 100, with all charting within the top 20 positions on the chart, two peaking within the top 5. Got to Be There was more successful in the U.S. than internationally, peaking at number 14 on the Billboard 200 while peaking at number 37 in the U.K. and number 121 in France.

== Music ==
Recording sessions for Ben ran from November 1971 to February 1972. It was produced by six people, and executive-produced by Berry Gordy. Songwriters for the 10 tracks of Ben include Mel Larson, Jerry Marcellino, Thom Bell, Linda Creed, The Corporation, Smokey Robinson, and Ronald White. The album's songs have tempos ranging from 69 beats per minute on "Ben", to 130 on "Shoo-Be-Doo-Be-Doo-Da-Day".

The album's title track, the theme song for the 1972 film of the same name (itself the sequel to the 1971 killer rat film Willard), won a Golden Globe and was nominated for an Academy Award for Best Song, losing to "The Morning After" by Maureen McGovern from another 1972 film, The Poseidon Adventure. "What Goes Around Comes Around" has similarities to Jackson's older brother Jackie's single "Didn't I (Blow Your Mind This Time)", which featured vocals from Jackson and his older brothers. For Ben, Jackson recorded covers of The Temptations' 1964 single "My Girl", The Stylistics' 1971 hit "People Make The World Go Round", Lionel Hampton's "Everybody's Somebody's Fool", Brenda Holloway's 1965 single "You Can Cry on My Shoulder" and Stevie Wonder's 1968 single "Shoo-Be-Doo-Be-Doo-Da-Day". "My Girl" has a funk rhythm and the song's score includes some call-and-response interaction, which is similar to what Jackson and his brothers displayed in their Jackson 5 material. In 1966, the Jackson 5 won a talent show at Gary's Theodore Roosevelt High School, where they performed "My Girl". "You Can Cry on My Shoulder" is a mid-tempo song. "We've Got a Good Thing Going" was previously issued as the B-side to Got to Be There's "I Wanna Be Where You Are" and "In Our Small Way" was also featured on Jackson's previous album, Got to Be There.

== Critical reception ==
Professional ratings
Review scores
Source	Rating
AllMusic	4/5 stars
Entertainment Weekly	B
Rolling Stone	2/5 stars

The album generally received mixed to positive reviews from contemporary music critics. Lindsay Planer of AllMusic rated Ben four out of five stars. Planer cited "What Goes Around Comes Around' as "one of Ben's better deep cuts" and "Shoo Be Doo Be Doo Da Day" as a "winner" while describing "In Our Small Way" as a "lesser note" for the album, having felt that the song contained a "hopelessly dated 'message'". Planer noted that one "interesting shift was the lack of participation from the Motown hitmaking machine known collectively as 'The Corporation'". Vince Aletti of Rolling Stone magazine rated the album two out of five stars. Aletti noted that while the album "contains a good deal more original material" it "has nothing as luscious as 'Got to Be There' or 'I Wanna Be Where You Are,'" but, "it's on the whole a much stronger album than the first." He noted that in the album's title track, Jackson had a "surprising amount of feeling" in his vocal performance. Leah Greenblatt of Entertainment Weekly graded the album a "B". Greenblatt commented that Ben's title track was a "testament to his talent" and added that the album would "always be defined" by that one song.

== Commercial performance ==
The album was released by Motown Records, Jackson's second studio album for the label as a solo artist, in August 1972. As part of promotion for the album, "Ben" was released as the album's lead and only single in July 1972. "Ben" was a commercial success worldwide, generally charting within the top 10 and top 20 positions on the music charts. The song peaked at number 1 on the Billboard Hot 100, which was Jackson's first, of what would be 13 songs, to top that chart during his career as a solo artist. "Ben" also charted on Billboard's Hot Adult Contemporary Tracks and Hot R&B/Hip-Hop Songs at number 3 and 5. "Ben" charted within the top 10 on the Dutch Top 40 chart, peaking at number 2 and number 7 on the U.K. Singles Chart, as well as charting at number 14 in Australia. "Everybody's Somebody's Fool" was planned to be released as the second single from the album, but was cancelled for unspecified reasons.

Ben was more successful on music charts in both the U.S. and worldwide than Jackson's previous studio album. The album peaked at number 5 on the U.S. Billboard 200, becoming Jackson's first of what would be six studio albums to peak within the top 10 on that chart. Ben also peaked at number 4 on the U.S. Top R&B/Hip-Hop Albums chart. On January 13, 1973, Ben debuted on the U.K. Album Chart at its peak position, number 17. The album remained within the country's music chart's top 50 positions for seven consecutive weeks. On January 1, 1974, the album was certified Silver by the British Phonographic Industry for shipping 60,000 units across the U.K. After Jackson's death in June 2009, his music surged in popularity. The album charted on the French music charts on July 25, 2009, at its peak position of number 162. Ben remained within the country's top 200 positions for two consecutive weeks. Ben sold over 2 million copies worldwide.

== Track listing ==
Side one
No.	Title	Writer(s)	Length
1.	"Ben"	Walter Scharf; Don Black	2:42
2.	"Greatest Show on Earth"	Mel Larson; Jerry Marcellino	2:47
3.	"People Make the World Go Round"	Thom Bell; Linda Creed	3:15
4.	"We've Got a Good Thing Going"	Alphonzo Mizell; Berry Gordy; Deke Richards; Freddie Perren	3:01
5.	"Everybody's Somebody's Fool"	Gladys Hampton; Regina Adams; Ace Adams	2:58

Side two
No.	Title	Writer(s)	Length
6.	"My Girl"	Smokey Robinson; Ronald White	3:05
7.	"What Goes Around Comes Around"	Allen Levinsky; Arthur Stokes; Dana Meyers; Floyd Weatherspoon	3:35
8.	"In Our Small Way"	Beatrice Verdi; Christine Yarian	3:39
9.	"Shoo-Be-Doo-Be-Doo-Da-Day"	Sylvia Moy; Henry Cosby; Stevie Wonder	3:19
10.	"You Can Cry on My Shoulder"	Berry Gordy	2:32

== Personnel ==
Adapted from AllMusic.

- Michael Jackson – vocals
- The Corporation – producer
- Hal Davis – producer
- Berry Gordy – executive producer
- Mel Larson – producer
- Jerry Marcellino – producer
- Bobby Taylor – producer

== Charts ==
Weekly chart performance for Ben
Chart (1972–1973)	Peak position
Canada Top Albums/CDs (RPM)	12
French Albums (SNEP)	162
UK Albums (Official Charts)	17
US Billboard 200	5
US Top R&B/Hip-Hop Albums (Billboard)	4

== Certifications and sales ==
Certifications and sales for Ben
Region	Certification	Certified units/sales
United Kingdom (BPI)	Silver	60,000^{^}
United States	—	350,000
^{^} Shipments figures based on certification alone.
