= Rockin' Robin (song) =

1958 single by Bobby Day

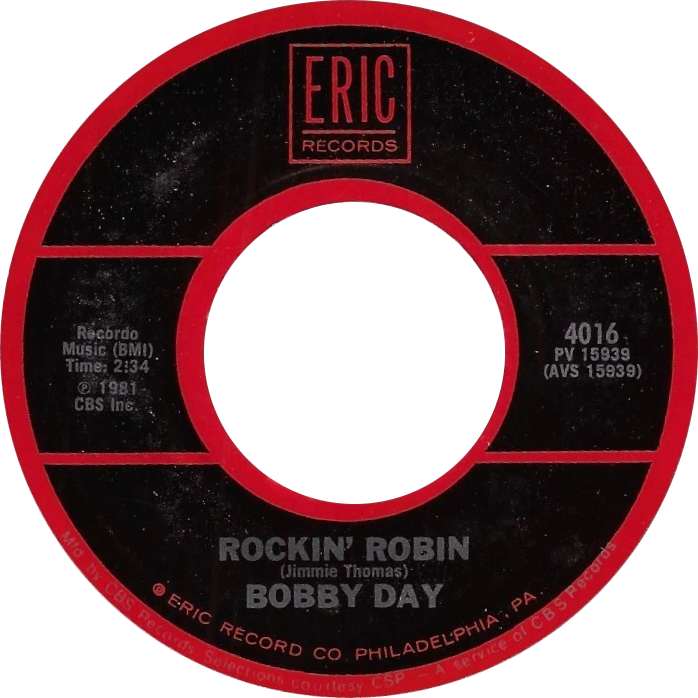
- 1981 US single reissue

Single by Bobby Day

from the album Rockin' with Robin
- B-side: "Over and Over"
- Released: June 27, 1958
- Genre: Rock and roll; R&B; doo-wop; novelty
- Length: 2:31 (single version)
- Label: Class
- Songwriter: Leon René
- Producer: Jimmie Thomas

Bobby Day singles chronology
"Rockin' Robin" (1958)	"Over and Over" (1958)

Official audio
- "Rockin' Robin" on YouTube

"Rockin' Robin" (originally released as "Rock-In Robin" on the Class Records 45 single) is a song written by Leon René under the pseudonym Jimmie Thomas, and recorded by American singer Bobby Day in 1958. It was Day's biggest hit single, becoming a number two hit on the Billboard Hot 100, and spent one week at the top of the R&B sales chart. Michael Jackson recorded his own version of the song in 1972, which also achieved success.

== Personnel ==
- Bobby Day – vocals
- Plas Johnson – piccolo
- Earl Palmer – drums
- Barney Kessel – guitar

== Copyright status ==
"Rockin' Robin" is in the public domain, as the owners never renewed the copyright.

== Charts ==
Chart performance for "Rockin' Robin"
Chart (1958)	Peak position
Australia (Kent Music Report)	9
Canada (CHUM Charts)	3
US Billboard Hot 100	2
US Billboard Rhythm & Blues Records	1

== Certifications ==
Certifications for "Rockin' Robin"
Region	Certification	Certified units/sales
New Zealand (RMNZ)	Gold	15,000^{‡}
^{‡} Sales+streaming figures based on certification alone.

== Michael Jackson version ==
"Rockin' Robin"
- Solid center variant of the UK single

Single by Michael Jackson

from the album Got to Be There
- B-side: "Love Is Here and Now You're Gone"
- Released: February 1972
- Studio: Motown Recording Studios (Los Angeles, California)
- Genre: Bubblegum pop
- Length: 2:31
- Label: Motown
- Songwriter: Leon René
- Producers: Mel Larson; Jerry Marcellino

Michael Jackson singles chronology
"Got to Be There" (1971)	"Rockin' Robin" (1972)	"I Wanna Be Where You Are" (1972)

Official audio
- "Rockin' Robin" on YouTube

In 1972, Michael Jackson released a cover of "Rockin' Robin". It was the second single from his debut solo album Got to Be There, after the title track. It was the most successful single from the album, hitting number one on the Cash Box singles chart, and peaking at number two on the Billboard Hot 100 (the same highest position as the original), behind "The First Time Ever I Saw Your Face" by Roberta Flack. It also peaked at number two Billboard soul singles chart, behind "In the Rain" by the Dramatics.

Record World said that "little Michael rocks in with a revival of the big Bobby Day hit of the rockin' 1950s".

=== Track listing ===
- A. "Rockin' Robin" – 2:30
- B. "Love Is Here and Now You're Gone" – 2:51

=== Chart performance ===
Chart performance for "Rockin' Robin" by Michael Jackson
Chart (1972)	Peak position
Australia (Go-Set National Top 40)	23
Australia (Kent Music Report)	16
Canada Top Singles (RPM)	13
Ireland (IRMA)	16
New Zealand (Listener)	16
Swedish Singles Chart (Kvällstoppen)	1
UK Singles (Official Charts)	3
US Billboard Best Selling Soul Singles	2
US Billboard Hot 100	2
US Cash Box Top 100	1

=== Certifications and sales ===
Certifications and sales for "Rockin' Robin" by Michael Jackson
Region	Certification	Certified units/sales
United Kingdom (BPI)	Silver	200,000^{‡}
United States (RIAA)	Platinum	2,000,000
^{‡} Sales+streaming figures based on certification alone.

== Lolly version ==
In 1999, English singer Lolly released a cover of "Rockin' Robin" as a double A-side single with "Big Boys Don't Cry". It was a top 10 hit on the UK Singles Chart, peaking at No. 10 in December of that year and remaining on the chart for a total of 11 weeks.

== See also ==
- List of 1950s one-hit wonders in the United States
