= The Motown Years =

Box set by Michael Jackson and the Jackson 5
- Released: September 9, 2008
- Recorded: 1969–1975: 1984 (overdubs on Farewell My Summer Love tracks)
- Genres: R&B; soul
- Labels: Motown; Universal
- Producers: The Corporation; Fonce Mizell; Mel Larson; Jerry Marcellino; Brian Holland; Hal Davis

Michael Jackson chronology
King of Pop (2008)	The Motown Years (2008)	The Collection (2009)

The Jackson 5/The Jacksons chronology
Gold (2005)	The Motown Years (2008)	I Want You Back! Unreleased Masters (2009)

The Motown Years (also known as The Motown Years 50) is a 3-disc compilation box set by American singer Michael Jackson and the group The Jackson 5, released on September 9, 2008, by Motown Records and Universal Music Group to celebrate Jackson's 50th birthday. The 50-track album features all of the hits through the Motown years from both the Jackson 5 (like "ABC", "I Want You Back", "Never Can Say Goodbye") and Michael's solo material (including "You've Got a Friend", "Ben", "Ain't No Sunshine" and "One Day in Your Life"), all of them released during their tenure with Motown (1969–1975), with the exception of "Farewell My Summer Love" and "Girl You're So Together", which were released in 1984, long after Jackson and the group had left the company.

Unlike Motown's previous Jackson 5 compilations, the 1995 4-disc Soulsation! and the 2005 2-disc Gold (both of which contain many of the same songs that appear in The Motown Years), the tracks on this 3-disc set are not ordered chronologically. Also in contrast to Soulsation!, there is no previously unreleased music. The only somewhat rare songs included are the B-sides "I'm So Happy" and "Love Song", both of which previously appeared on the 2000 version of The Jackson 5's Anthology (re-released with the title Gold in 2005), and also the 2001 "Two Classic Albums/One CD" series, as bonus tracks on Maybe Tomorrow and Lookin' Through the Windows, respectively.

A Chinese re-issue with different track selection was released on August 29, 2022 (what would've been Michael Jackson's 64th birthday) to celebrate 50th anniversary of Jackson's first solo album Got to Be There.

== Track listing ==
=== International standard edition ===
Disc 1 (Jackson 5)
No.	Title	Writer(s)	First appeared on	Length
1.	"ABC"	The Corporation (Berry Gordy, Freddie Perren, Deke Richards, Alphonzo Mizell)	ABC (1970)	3:01
2.	"Never Can Say Goodbye"	Clifton Davis	Maybe Tomorrow (1971)	3:03
3.	"Ready or Not (Here I Come)"	Thomas Bell; William Hart	Third Album (1970)	2:34
4.	"Love Song"	The Corporation; Christine Yarian	B-side of "Lookin' Through the Windows"	3:27
5.	"Forever Came Today"	Brian and Eddie Holland; Lamont Dozier	Moving Violation (1975)	6:23
6.	"The Life of the Party"	Clarence Drayton; Hal Davis; Tanny Smith	Dancing Machine (1974)	2:35
7.	"Doctor My Eyes"	Jackson Browne	Lookin' Through the Windows (1972)	3:11
8.	"All I Do Is Think Of You"	Brian Holland; Michael Lovesmith	Moving Violation	3:13
9.	"I Am Love" (Pts. 1 & 2)	Donald Fenceton; Jerry Marcellino; Mel Larson; Roderick H. Rancifer	Dancing Machine	7:26
10.	"Darling Dear"	Allen Story; George Gordy; Rosemary Gordy	Third Album	2:38
11.	"Maybe Tomorrow"	The Corporation	Maybe Tomorrow	4:48
12.	"I Found that Girl"	The Corporation	ABC	3:10
13.	"It's Too Late to Change the Time"	Leon Ware; Pamela Sawyer	G.I.T.: Get It Together (1973)	4:00
14.	"Lookin' Through the Windows"	Clifton Davis	Lookin' Through the Windows	3:37
15.	"Who's Lovin' You"	Smokey Robinson	Diana Ross Presents The Jackson 5 (1969)	3:59
16.	"Whatever You Got, I Want"	Gene Marcellino; Jerry Marcellino; Mel Larson	Dancing Machine	2:56
17.	"I'll Be There"	Berry Gordy Jr.; Bob West; Hal Davis; Willie Hutch	Third Album	3:59

Disc 2 (Jackson 5)
No.	Title	Writer(s)	First appeared on	Length
1.	"I Want You Back"	The Corporation	Diana Ross Presents The Jackson 5	2:58
2.	"Dancing Machine" (album version)	Donald Fletcher; Hal Davis; Weldon Dean Parks	G.I.T.: Get It Together	3:29
3.	"Sugar Daddy"	The Corporation	Greatest Hits (1971)	2:33
4.	"Little Bitty Pretty One"	Robert Byrd	Lookin' Through the Windows	2:48
5.	"Hum Along and Dance"	Barrett Strong; Norman Whitfield	G.I.T.: Get It Together	8:37
6.	"Corner of the Sky"	Stephen Schwartz	Skywriter (1973)	3:40
7.	"I'm So Happy"	The Corporation	B-side of "Sugar Daddy"	2:48
8.	"Get It Together"	Berry Gordy Jr.; Donald Fletcher; Hal Davis; Jerry Marcellino; Mel Larson	G.I.T.: Get It Together	2:49
9.	"Goin' Back to Indiana"	The Corporation	Third Album	3:32
10.	"Skywriter"	Jerry Marcellino; Mel Larson	Skywriter	3:10
11.	"The Love You Save"	The Corporation	ABC (1970)	3:01
12.	"Mama's Pearl"	The Corporation	Third Album	3:09
13.	"Touch" (originally by The Supremes)	Frank Wilson; Pamela Sawyer	Skywriter	3:01
14.	"La-La (Means I Love You)" (long version)	Thom Bell; William Hart	ABC	3:29
15.	"It's Great to Be Here"	The Corporation	Maybe Tomorrow	3:00
16.	"Hallelujah Day"	Christine Tarian; Freddie Perren	Skywriter	2:45
17.	"Santa Claus Is Coming to Town"	Haven Gillespie; J. Fred Coots	Jackson 5 Christmas Album (1970)	2:25

Disc 3 (Michael Jackson)
No.	Title	Writer(s)	First appeared on	Length
1.	"Farewell My Summer Love" (1984 mix)	Kenny Lewis	Farewell My Summer Love (1984)	3:46
2.	"You've Got a Friend" (originally by James Taylor)	Carole King	Got to Be There (1972)	4:45
3.	"My Girl" (originally by The Temptations)	Ronald White; Smokey Robinson	Ben (1972)	3:11
4.	"One Day In Your Life"	Samuel F. Brown III; Renee Armand	Forever, Michael (1975)	4:20
5.	"Just a Little Bit of You"	Brian Holland; Eddie Holland	Forever, Michael	3:17
6.	"Got To Be There"	Elliot Willensky	Got to Be There	3:26
7.	"We've Got a Good Thing Going"	The Corporation	Ben	3:05
8.	"Rockin' Robin" (originally by Bobby Day)	Leon Rene (using pseudonym Jimmie Thomas)	Got to Be There	2:35
9.	"Ben" (from the film Ben)	Don Black; Walter Scharf	Ben	2:48
10.	"I Wanna Be Where You Are"	Arthur Ross; Leon Ware	Got to Be There	3:00
11.	"Girl You're So Together" (1984 mix)	Kenny Lewis, Kenneth Melbourne	Farewell My Summer Love	3:11
12.	"We're Almost There"	Brian Holland; Eddie Holland	Forever, Michael	3:47
13.	"Wings of My Love"	The Corporation	Got to Be There	3:24
14.	"Girl Don't Take Your Love from Me"	Willie Hutch	Got to Be There	3:50
15.	"Music and Me"	Donald Fenceton; Jerry Marcellino; Mel Larson; Mike Cannon	Music & Me (1973)	2:40
16.	"Ain't No Sunshine" (originally by Bill Withers)	Bill Withers	Got to Be There	4:10

=== Chinese limited re-release (2022) ===
Disc 1 (Jackson 5)
No.	Title	Writer(s)	First appeared on	Length
1.	"Big Boy"	Ed Silvers	non-album single	2:59
2.	"I Want You Back"	The Corporation	Diana Ross Presents The Jackson 5	3:00
3.	"Who's Loving You"	Smokey Robinson	Diana Ross Presents The Jackson 5	4:03
4.	"Can You Remember"	Thom Bell, William Hart	Diana Ross Presents The Jackson 5	3:08
5.	"Stand!"	Sylvester Stewart	Diana Ross Presents The Jackson 5	2:36
6.	"ABC"	The Corporation	ABC	2:56
7.	"The Love You Save"	The Corporation	ABC	3:00
8.	"La La (Means I Love You)"	Thom Bell, William Hart	ABC	3:29
9.	"I'll Bet You"	George Clinton, Sidney Barnes, Theresa Lindsey	ABC	3:17
10.	"It's Your Thing"	Ronald Isley, O'Kelly Isley Jr., Rudolph Isley	Soulsation!	3:42
11.	"I'll Be There"	Berry Gordy, Bob West, Hal Davis, Willie Hutch	Third Album	3:58
12.	"Goin' Back to Indiana"	The Corporation	Third Album	3:31
13.	"Mama's Pearl"	The Corporation	Third Album	3:09
14.	"Darling Dear"	George Horgay Gordy, Robert Gordy, Allen Story	Third Album	2:38
15.	"Give Love on Christmas Day"	The Corporation	Christmas Album	3:04
16.	"Maybe Tomorrow"	The Corporation	Maybe Tomorrow	4:42
17.	"Never Can Say Goodbye"	Clifton Davis	Maybe Tomorrow	2:59
18.	"It's Great to Be Here"	The Corporation	Maybe Tomorrow	3:00
19.	"Sugar Daddy"	The Corporation	Greatest Hits	2:30
20.	"Feelin' Alright" (studio version)	Dave Mason	Goin' Back to Indiana / Come and Get It: The Rare Pearls	3:11
21.	"Ain't Nothing Like the Real Thing"	Nickolas Ashford, Valerie Simpson	Lookin' Through the Windows	2:30
22.	"Lookin' Through the Windows"	Clifton Davis	Lookin' Through the Windows	3:45
23.	"Doctor My Eyes"	Jackson Browne	Lookin' Through the Windows	3:14
24.	"Love Song"	The Corporation, Christine Yarian	non-album single	3:25
Total length:				77:46

Disc 2 (Jackson 5)
No.	Title	Writer(s)	First appeared on	Length
1.	"Skywriter"	Mel Larson, Jerry Marcellino	Skywriter	3:10
2.	"Hallelujah Day"	Freddie Perren, Christine Yarian	Skywriter	2:49
3.	"Touch"	Pam Sawyer, Frank Wilson	Skywriter	3:01
4.	"Corner of the Sky"	Stephen Schwartz	Skywriter	3:31
5.	"Superstition" (live in Japan)	Stevie Wonder	In Japan!	2:54
6.	"Get It Together" (alternative version)	Hal Davis, Donald Fletcher, Berry Gordy, Mel Larson, Jerry Marcellino	G.I.T.: Get It Together	2:47
7.	"Hum Along and Dance"	Barrett Strong, Norman Whitfield	G.I.T.: Get It Together	8:35
8.	"It's Too Late to Change the Time"	Pam Sawyer, Leon Ware	G.I.T.: Get It Together	3:56
9.	"Dancing Machine" (uncut version)	Hal Davis, Donald Fletcher, Dean Parks	G.I.T.: Get It Together	4:25
10.	"I Am Love"	Don Fenceton, Jerry Marcellino, Mel Larson, Ronnie Rancifer	Dancing Machine	7:29
11.	"Whatever You Got, I Want"	Gene Marcellino, Jerry Marcellino, Mel Larson	Dancing Machine	2:57
12.	"The Life of the Party"	Clarence Drayton, Hal Davis, Tamy Smith	Dancing Machine	2:34
13.	"You're My Best Friend"	Sam Brown, Christine Yarian	Joyful Jukebox Music	3:25
14.	"We're Here to Entertain You"	Hal Davis, Nita Garfield, Charlotte O'Hara	Joyful Jukebox Music	3:03
15.	"Buttercup"	Stevie Wonder	I Want You Back! Unreleased Masters	3:53
16.	"Forever Came Today" (alternative version)	Holland–Dozier–Holland	Moving Violation	6:12
17.	"Body Language (Do the Love Dance)"	Hal Davis, Donald Fletcher	Moving Violation	4:07
18.	"All I Do Is Think of You"	Michael Lovesmith, Brian Holland	Moving Violation	3:15
19.	"Breezy"	Mel Larson, Jerry Marcellino	Moving Violation	3:38
20.	"Joyful Jukebox Music"	Tom Bee, Michael Edward Campbell	Joyful Jukebox Music	3:16
Total length:				78:57

Disc 3 (Michael Jackson)
No.	Title	Writer(s)	First appeared on	Length
1.	"Ain't No Sunshine"	Bill Withers	Got to Be There	4:11
2.	"I Wanna Be Where You Are"	Arthur "T-Boy" Ross, Leon Ware	Got to Be There	3:01
3.	"Got to Be There"	Elliot Willensky	Got to Be There	3:23
4.	"Rockin' Robin"	Leon Rene	Got to Be There	2:32
5.	"Maria (You Were the Only One)"	Lawrence Brown, Linda Glover, George Gordy, Allen Story	Got to Be There	3:40
6.	"Ben"	Walter Scharf, Don Black	Ben	2:46
7.	"People Make the World Go 'Round"	Thom Bell, Linda Creed	Ben	3:17
8.	"We've Got a Good Thing Going"	The Corporation	Ben	3:03
9.	"With a Child's Heart"	Sylvia Moy, Henry Cosby, Vicki Basemore	Music & Me	3:33
10.	"Happy"	Michel Legrand, Smokey Robinson	Music & Me	3:26
11.	"Morning Glow"	Stephen Schwartz	Music & Me	3:37
12.	"Music and Me"	Jerry Marcellino, Mel Larson, Don Fenceton, Mike Cannon	Music & Me	2:38
13.	"Little Christmas Tree"	George Clinton, Artie Wayne	A Motown Christmas	3:38
14.	"Farewell My Summer Love" (original 1973 mix)	Keni St. Lewis	Farewell My Summer Love	3:37
15.	"Call on Me" (original 1973 mix)	Fonce Mizell, Larry Mizell	Farewell My Summer Love	3:21
16.	"Girl You're So Together" (original 1973 mix)	Keni St. Lewis	Farewell My Summer Love	2:59
17.	"Make Tonight All Mine" (original 1973 mix)	Freddie Perren, Christine Yarian	One Day in Your Life	3:03
18.	"If I Don't Love You This Way" (1987 remix)	Leon Ware, Pam Sawyer	The Original Soul of Michael Jackson	3:25
19.	"We're Almost There" (DJ Spinna remix radio edit)	Eddie Holland, Brian Holland	Forever, Michael	4:25
20.	"Just a Little Bit of You"	Eddie Holland, Brian Holland	Forever, Michael	3:12
21.	"One Day in Your Life"	Sam Brown, Renée Armand	Forever, Michael	4:18
22.	"Dear Michael"	Hal Davis, Elliot Willensky	Forever, Michael	2:39
23.	"If 'n I Was God" (original 1973 mix)	Robert Sherman, Richard Sherman	Looking Back to Yesterday	4:06
Total length:				77:50

== Charts ==
=== Weekly charts ===
Weekly chart performance for The Motown Years
Chart (2008–2009)	Peak position
Australian Albums (ARIA)	14
Austrian Albums (Ö3 Austria)	45
Belgian Albums (Ultratop Flanders)	3
Belgian Albums (Ultratop Wallonia)	3
Danish Albums (Hitlisten)	7
Dutch Albums (Album Top 100)	4
German Albums (Offizielle Top 100)	36
Hungarian Albums (MAHASZ)	19
Irish Albums (IRMA)	38
Italian Albums (FIMI)	21
New Zealand Albums (RMNZ)	12
Norwegian Albums (VG-lista)	1
Scottish Albums (Official Charts)	12
Spanish Albums (Promusicae)	7
Swedish Albums (Sverigetopplistan)	33
Swiss Albums (Schweizer Hitparade)	19
UK Albums (Official Charts)	4

=== Year-end charts ===
2009 year-end chart performance for The Motown Years
Chart (2009)	Position
Belgian Albums (Ultratop Flanders)	56
Belgian Albums (Ultratop Wallonia)	64
Dutch Albums (Album Top 100)	82

== Certifications ==
Region	Certification	Certified units/sales
Australia (ARIA)	Gold	35,000^{^}
United Kingdom (BPI)	Gold	100,000^{*}
^{*} Sales figures based on certification alone.^{^} Shipments figures based on certification alone.
