= Jackson 5: The Ultimate Collection =

Greatest hits album by The Jackson 5
- Released: August 15, 1995
- Length: 74:17
- Label: Motown

The Jackson 5 chronology
Soulsation! (1995)	Jackson 5: The Ultimate Collection (1995)	20th Century Masters – The Millennium Collection: The Best of The Jackson 5 (1999)

Alternative cover
- The Very Best of Michael Jackson with the Jackson Five compilation cover

Professional ratings
Review scores
Source	Rating
AllMusic	5/5 stars

Jackson 5: The Ultimate Collection is a compilation album released by Motown Records in 1995 featuring the music of The Jackson 5. The collection features selections from the group's Motown discography (recorded between 1969 and 1975), as well as a selection from group members Michael and Jermaine's solo output recorded during that time period, and is meant to serve as a condensed single-disc version of the 4-disc box set Soulsation! (1995). In the United Kingdom, a different track listing was used and was released as The Very Best of Michael Jackson with the Jackson Five, with a September 2001 re-release on Island Records titled The Best of Michael Jackson and the Jackson 5ive - The Motown Years.

== Track listings ==
Tracks with an asterisk (*) are performed by Michael Jackson. "Daddy's Home" is performed by Jermaine Jackson backed by the Jackson 5.

American release	Original UK release	UK 2001 re-release	Song	Originating album
1	1	1	"I Want You Back"	Diana Ross Presents The Jackson 5
2	2	2	"ABC"	ABC
3	3	3	"The Love You Save"	ABC
4	4	4	"I'll Be There"	Third Album
5			"It's Your Thing"	Soulsation!
6			"Who's Lovin' You?"	Diana Ross Presents The Jackson 5
7	5	5	"Mama's Pearl"	Third Album
8	6	6	"Never Can Say Goodbye"	Maybe Tomorrow
9			"Maybe Tomorrow"	Maybe Tomorrow
10	7	7	"Got to Be There"(*)	Got to Be There
11			"Sugar Daddy"	Greatest Hits
12	8	8	"Rockin' Robin"(*)	Got to Be There
13			"Daddy's Home"	Jermaine
14	10	10	"Lookin' Through the Windows"	Lookin' Through the Windows
15			"I Wanna Be Where You Are"(*)	Got to Be There
16			"Get It Together"	G.I.T.: Get It Together
17			"Dancing Machine"	G.I.T.: Get It Together
18			"The Life of the Party"	Dancing Machine
19			"I Am Love"	Dancing Machine
20			"Just a Little Bit of You"(*)	Forever, Michael
21			"It's Your Thing (The J5 In '95 Extended Remix)"	
	9	9	"Ain't No Sunshine"(*)	Got to Be There
	11	11	"Ben"*	Ben
	12	12	"Doctor My Eyes"	Lookin' Through the Windows
	13	13	"Hallelujah Day"	Skywriter
	14	14	"Skywriter"	Skywriter
	15	15	"Happy"(*)	Music & Me
	16	17	"We're Almost There"(*)	Forever, Michael
	17	16	"One Day in Your Life"(*)	Forever, Michael
	18	19	"Girl You're So Together"(*)	Farewell My Summer Love
	19	18	"Farewell My Summer Love"(*)	Farewell My Summer Love
	20	20	"I Want You Back (PWL '88 Remix)"	
	21		"It's Your Thing (The J5 In '95 House Remix)"	

== Certifications ==
Region	Certification	Certified units/sales
United Kingdom (BPI)	Gold	100,000^{*}
^{*} Sales figures based on certification alone.
