= Soulsation! =

Compilation album by the Jackson 5
- Released: June 27, 1995
- Recorded: 1969–1975
- Length: 4:34:10
- Label: Motown
- Producers: The Corporation; Bobby Taylor; Hal Davis; Norman Whitfield

The Jackson 5 chronology
Children of the Light (1993)	Soulsation! (1995)	Jackson 5: The Ultimate Collection (1995)

Alternative cover
- UK design

Professional ratings
Review scores
Source	Rating
AllMusic	4/5 stars

Soulsation! is a 4-CD box set of music recorded by the Jackson 5 during their tenure at Motown Records from 1969 to 1975, before leaving Motown for CBS Records. The box set was released in 1995 to celebrate the 25th anniversary of the Jackson 5 becoming the first group to have its first four singles go straight to number 1 on the US Billboard charts. Soulsation! included an introduction from the group's sister Janet, liner notes from David Ritz, and an essay from the brothers' first producer, Bobby Taylor. The fourth disc features 17 previously unreleased songs, most recorded from mid-1969 to early 1972. The set also includes solo numbers from brothers Michael, Jermaine, and Jackie.

Songs from all of the Jackson 5's studio albums from 1969 to 1975 are included here, as well as half of the 1976 album of previously unreleased material Joyful Jukebox Music.

== Track listing ==
=== Soulsation! – disc one ===
No.	Title	Length	First appeared on
1.	"I Want You Back"	3:03	Diana Ross Presents The Jackson 5 (1969)
2.	"Who's Lovin' You"	4:06	Diana Ross Presents The Jackson 5
3.	"You've Changed"	3:16	Diana Ross Presents The Jackson 5
4.	"Stand!"	2:30	Diana Ross Presents The Jackson 5
5.	"Can You Remember"	3:10	Diana Ross Presents The Jackson 5
6.	"ABC"	2:56	ABC (1970)
7.	"The Love You Save"	3:01	ABC
8.	"I Found That Girl"	2:57	ABC
9.	"La-La (Means I Love You)"	2:52	ABC
10.	"I'll Bet You"	2:26	ABC
11.	"(Come 'Round Here) I'm the One You Need"	2:46	ABC
12.	"The Young Folks"	2:50	ABC
13.	"I'll Be There"	3:59	Third Album (1970)
14.	"Goin' Back to Indiana"	3:32	Third Album
15.	"Can I See You in the Morning"	3:09	Third Album
16.	"Mama's Pearl"	3:09	Third Album
17.	"Reach In"	3:28	Third Album
18.	"Christmas Won't Be the Same This Year"	2:31	Jackson 5 Christmas Album (1970)
19.	"Santa Claus Is Comin' to Town"	2:24	Jackson 5 Christmas Album
20.	"Never Can Say Goodbye"	2:57	Maybe Tomorrow (1971)
21.	"Maybe Tomorrow"	4:41	Maybe Tomorrow
22.	"She's Good"	2:59	Maybe Tomorrow

=== Soulsation! – disc two ===
No.	Title	Length	First appeared on
1.	"Got to Be There" (Michael Jackson)	3:23	Got to Be There (1972)
2.	"People Make the World Go 'Round" (Michael Jackson)	3:15	Ben (1972)
3.	"Teenage Symphony"	2:45	Looking Back to Yesterday (1986)
4.	"Sugar Daddy"	2:33	Greatest Hits (1971)
5.	"Ain't Nothing Like the Real Thing"	2:30	Lookin' Through the Windows (1972)
6.	"Lookin' Through the Windows"	3:46	Lookin' Through the Windows
7.	"Doctor My Eyes"	3:12	Lookin' Through the Windows
8.	"Little Bitty Pretty One"	2:48	Lookin' Through the Windows
9.	"If I Have to Move a Mountain"	3:20	Lookin' Through the Windows
10.	"Rockin' Robin" (Michael Jackson)	2:30	Got To Be There
11.	"I Wanna Be Where You Are" (Michael Jackson)	3:00	Got To Be There
12.	"Ben" (Michael Jackson)	2:42	Ben
13.	"Skywriter"	3:08	Skywriter (1973)
14.	"You Made Me What I Am"	2:50	Skywriter
15.	"Hallelujah Day"	2:46	Skywriter
16.	"Touch"	3:00	Skywriter
17.	"Corner of the Sky"	3:33	Skywriter
18.	"The Boogie Man"	2:56	Skywriter
19.	"Get It Together"	2:48	G.I.T.: Get It Together (1973)
20.	"Dancing Machine" (single version)	2:35	Dancing Machine (1974)
21.	"It's Too Late to Change the Time"	3:59	G.I.T.: Get It Together
22.	"Whatever You Got, I Want"	2:58	Dancing Machine

=== Soulsation! – disc three ===
No.	Title	Length	First appeared on
1.	"The Life of the Party"	2:35	Dancing Machine
2.	"I Am Love"	7:29	Dancing Machine
3.	"If I Don't Love You This Way"	3:28	Dancing Machine
4.	"Mama I Got a Brand New Thing (Don't Say No)"	7:11	G.I.T.: Get It Together
5.	"Forever Came Today"	6:23	Moving Violation (1975)
6.	"Body Language (Do the Love Dance)"	4:07	Moving Violation
7.	"All I Do Is Think of You"	3:17	Moving Violation
8.	"Moving Violation" (listed as "It's a Moving Violation")	3:37	Moving Violation
9.	"(You Were Made) Especially for Me"	3:28	Moving Violation
10.	"Honey Love"	4:40	Moving Violation
11.	"That's How Love Goes" (Jermaine Jackson)	3:27	Jermaine (1972)
12.	"Daddy's Home" (Jermaine Jackson)	3:03	Jermaine
13.	"Just a Little Bit of You" (Michael Jackson)	3:14	Forever, Michael (1975)
14.	"Love is the Thing You Need"	3:05	Joyful Jukebox Music (1976)
15.	"The Eternal Light"	3:13	Joyful Jukebox Music
16.	"Pride & Joy"	3:13	Joyful Jukebox Music
17.	"You're My Best Friend, My Love"	3:24	Joyful Jukebox Music
18.	"Joyful Jukebox Music"	3:15	Joyful Jukebox Music
19.	"Love Don't Want to Leave" (Jackie Jackson)	3:10	Jackie Jackson (1973)

=== Soulsation! – disc four (Rare & unreleased) ===
1. "Can't Get Ready for Losing You" (originally performed by Willie Hutch and also recorded by the Miracles) – 3:48
2. "You Ain't Giving Me What I Want (So I'm Taking It All Back)" – 4:23
3. "Reach Out I'll Be There" (originally performed by the Four Tops) – 3:44
4. "I'm Glad It Rained" – 4:02
5. "A Fool for You" (originally performed by Ray Charles) – 4:33
6. "It's Your Thing" (originally performed by the Isley Brothers) – 3:40
7. "Everybody Is a Star" (originally performed by Sly and the Family Stone) – 3:01
8. "I Need You" (Jermaine Jackson) – 3:25
9. "Ooh, I'd Love to Be with You" (*) (from the album Skywriter) – 2:46
10. "Just a Little Misunderstanding" (originally performed by the Contours) – 2:40
11. "Jamie" – 3:30
12. "Ask the Lonely" (originally performed by the Four Tops) – 3:24
13. "We Can Have Fun" – 3:21
14. "I Hear a Symphony" (originally performed by the Supremes) – 2:32
15. "Let's Have a Party" – 3:10
16. "Love Scenes" – 2:40
17. "LuLu" – 2:39
18. "Money Honey" (originally performed by the Drifters) – 2:55
19. "Coming Home" – 3:04
- "Ooh, I'd Love to Be with You" originally appeared on the album Skywriter, and a longer, alternate version of "I Hear a Symphony" was previously included on the Michael Jackson compilation album Looking Back to Yesterday in 1986.
- A remix of "It's Your Thing" called "The J5 in '95 Extended Remix" (5:57) was included on the one-disc condensed version of this box set called Jackson 5: The Ultimate Collection (1995).
- A different remix of "It's Your Thing" called "The J5 in '95 House Remix" (4:47) appears only on the original 1995 UK version of The Ultimate Collection, where it was titled The Very Best of Michael Jackson with the Jackson Five. When the UK collection was reissued in 2001, this was the only track removed from the compilation.
