= 20th Century Masters – The Millennium Collection: The Best of the Jackson 5 =

Greatest hits album by the Jackson 5
- Released: October 7, 1999
- Recorded: July 1969 – May 1973
- Genre: R&B
- Length: 35:44
- Label: Motown/Universal

The Jackson 5/The Jacksons chronology
| Jackson 5: The Ultimate Collection (1995) | 20th Century Masters – The Millennium Collection: The Best of the Jackson 5 (1999) | The Essential Jacksons (2004) |

20th Century Masters – The Millennium Collection: The Best of the Jackson 5 is a 1999 greatest hits album for R&B group the Jackson 5, released by Motown Records. Issued as part of Universal's Millennium Collection series, the compilation presents a concise selection of material from the group's Motown era, highlighting some of their most representative recordings from the early 1970s, also including selected solo tracks by Michael Jackson and Jermaine Jackson.

The album was met with positive critical notes, often praised as a focused and effective introduction to the group's classic Motown output. It later experienced a resurgence in popularity, returning to the charts years after its release and ultimately selling over one million copies in the United States.

== Album details ==
The compilation The Best of the Jackson 5 is part of the series "20th Century Masters: The Millennium Collection", a set of albums released by Universal Music beginning in 1999. According to Billboard, the label issued around 400 titles in this affordably priced collection of greatest-hits compilations. The series gathers selected tracks from the catalogs of artists across multiple genres, offering listeners a concise and representative introduction to their work.

The edition dedicated to the Jackson 5 features recordings made between July 1969 and May 1973, when the group was signed to Motown. Notably, it also includes the song "Daddy's Home", performed by Jermaine Jackson on his solo album Jermaine (1972), as well as two tracks from Michael Jackson's debut solo album Got to Be There (1972): the title track and "I Wanna Be Where You Are". The compilation also presents the short version of "Dancing Machine", the group's final Top 5 hit on the Billboard Hot 100 during their time at Motown. The cover photo is from the same photo session of the special 45 rpm fan-club release "Rappin' With the Jackson Five", in which Michael, Marlon, Tito, and Jermaine interviewed one another.

== Critical reception ==
Professional ratings
Review scores
| Source | Rating |
|---|---|
| AllMusic | 3/5 stars |
| Tom Hull | A− |
| The Rolling Stone Album Guide | 3/5 stars |

Stephen Thomas Erlewine of AllMusic said this album was "a terrific, concise collection of the group's 11 biggest hits", with two solo Michael Jackson singles. It resulted "a budget-line disc ideal for budget-minded casual fans".

Analyzing the periods of the songs included in the compilation, critic Tom Hull emphasized that "the family business caught fire "when Michael Jackson, at just ten years old, led a sequence of "four straight number ones", with tracks like "I Want You Back" and "ABC", which, according to him, "brought back the jangle of Motown's heyday". However, Hull noted that the group "rarely peaked like that again", pointing to the inconsistency of the selected material, though he acknowledged that the Jackson 5 "got away with a few ballads" and "lucked out with the rote 'Dancing Machine'". He concluded, ultimately, that it was "a very inconsistent outfit, brilliant for a moment".

== Commercial performance ==
The album failed to chart in Billboard at its original release year 1999. But in 2009, after Michael Jackson's sudden death, it charted and peaked at number 8 on Billboard Catalog Albums chart dated July 25, 2009. The album cracked the Billboard 200 in February 2012, peaking at number 114.

As of August 2013, the album has sold 1,063,000 copies in the US.

== Track listing ==
| No. | Title | Writer(s) | First appeared on | Length |
|---|---|---|---|---|
| 1. | "I Want You Back" | The Corporation (Berry Gordy, Freddie Perren, Alphonzo Mizell and Deke Richards) | Diana Ross Presents the Jackson 5 (1969) | 3:00 |
| 2. | "ABC" | The Corporation | ABC (1970) | 2:59 |
| 3. | "The Love You Save" | The Corporation | ABC | 3:06 |
| 4. | "I'll Be There" | Berry Gordy, Bob West, Willie Hutch, Hal Davis | Third Album (1970) | 3:59 |
| 5. | "Never Can Say Goodbye" | Clifton Davis | Maybe Tomorrow (1971) | 3:02 |
| 6. | "Got to Be There" (Michael Jackson) | Elliot Willensky | Got to Be There (1972) | 3:24 |
| 7. | "Sugar Daddy" | The Corporation | Greatest Hits (1971) | 2:34 |
| 8. | "Daddy's Home" (Jermaine Jackson) | The Corporation | Jermaine (1972) | 3:08 |
| 9. | "I Wanna Be Where You Are" (Michael Jackson) | Arthur Ross, Leon Ware | Got To Be There | 3:01 |
| 10. | "Maybe Tomorrow" | The Corporation | Maybe Tomorrow | 4:46 |
| 11. | "Dancing Machine" (short version) | Hal Davis, Don Fletcher, Dean Parks | Dancing Machine (album) (1974) | 2:48 |
| Total length: | | | | 35:44 |

== Personnel ==
Credits adapted from the liner notes of 20th Century Masters – The Millennium Collection: The Best of the Jackson 5 LP (Motown, catalog no. 012 153 364-2).

- Art Direction by Vartan
- Compilation Produced by Harry Weinger
- Production Coordination by Margaret Goldfarb
- Design by t42design
- Liner Notes by Brian Chin
- Digital Mastering by Suha Gur
- Photography by Motown Archives

== Charts ==
Weekly charts for The Best of the Jackson 5
| Chart (2009) | Peak position |
|---|---|
| US Top Catalog Albums | 8 |

Weekly charts for The Best of the Jackson 5
| Chart (2012) | Peak position |
|---|---|
| US Billboard 200 | 114 |

Weekly charts for The Best of the Jackson 5
| Chart (2022) | Peak position |
|---|---|
| Canadian Albums (Billboard) | 50 |

== Certifications ==
Certifications for The Best of the Jackson 5
| Region | Certification | Certified units/sales |
|---|---|---|
| United States (RIAA) | Gold | 500,000^{^} |
^{^} Shipments figures based on certification alone.
