= Bless You (Martha and the Vandellas song) =

Single by Martha Reeves and the Vandellas

from the album Black Magic
- B-side: "Hope I Don't Get My Heart Broke"
- Released: September 1971
- Recorded: Hitsville USA, Detroit, Michigan; Hitsville West, Los Angeles, California, 1971
- Genre: Soul/pop
- Length: 3:01
- Label: Gordy; G 7110
- Songwriter(s): The Corporation - (Berry Gordy, Freddie Perren, Alphonzo Mizell and Deke Richards)
- Producer(s): The Corporation

Martha Reeves and the Vandellas singles chronology
"I Gotta Let You Go" (1970)	"Bless You" (1971)	"In and Out of My Life" (1972)

"Bless You" is a 1971 hit single by Motown recording group Martha and the Vandellas (credited as Martha Reeves & the Vandellas) and was the group's last significant hit before disbanding in 1973.

== Overview ==
After a period of inactivity because of Martha Reeves' mental illness, the singer returned to the studio with the new version of The Vandellas, who had gone through different member lineups. By now, the lineup of The Vandellas included Reeves' kid sister Lois Reeves and a former member of The Velvelettes named Sandra Tilley. The group had sporadically recorded and performed together before 1970 when they issued the Natural Resources album. For their next project, Motown decided to recruit the hotly new hit-making producers for the label: The Corporation, to help them with producing their new album. Among the first singles they worked on was a Jackson 5-styled funky dance record titled "Bless You". Featuring Martha and the Vandellas members, it also included additional harmony singing parts by The Blackberries.

== Release ==
Released in the fall of 1971, "Bless You" briefly brought the group back to modest success on the Billboard Hot 100 where it reached number fifty-three on the chart, becoming their highest-charted single in three years and their highest-charted single on the pop chart during their brief seventies period together. The single also crossed over successfully to the R&B chart where it peaked at number twenty-nine and hit the top forty in the United Kingdom where it peaked at number thirty-three and was a top twenty hit in Canada. The single became the group's last major hit. Two years later, the group would disband, and Martha Reeves would pursue a solo career.

== Personnel ==
- Produced, written, composed and arranged by the Corporation
- Lead vocals by Martha Reeves
- Background vocals by Sandra "Lois" Reeves, Sandra Tilley and the Blackberries
- Instrumentation by assorted Los Angeles musicians
