= Thriller 25 =

Studio album (reissue) by Michael Jackson
- Released: February 8, 2008
- Recorded: April–November 1982; 1990; November 2007
- Length: 67:11 (CD); 28:32 (DVD)
- Labels: Epic; Legacy; Sony BMG; MJJ
- Producers: Michael Jackson; Quincy Jones; will.i.am; Akon; Kanye West; Giorgio Tuinfort; Anthony Kilhoffer

Michael Jackson chronology
Visionary: The Video Singles (2006)	Thriller 25 (2008)	King of Pop (2008)

Alternative cover

Singles from Thriller 25
- 1. "The Girl Is Mine 2008" Released: January 14, 2008; 2. "Wanna Be Startin' Somethin' 2008" Released: January 23, 2008

Thriller 25 is the 25th-anniversary reissue of Thriller (1982), the sixth studio album by American singer and songwriter Michael Jackson. The original album has sold 70 million copies worldwide, making it the best-selling album of all time. Thriller 25 was released by Legacy Recordings, the reissue division of Sony BMG. In addition to the original material, the reissue includes remixes, new material, a DVD in some versions and collaborations with contemporary artists. Thriller 25 was one of the last recorded works released during Jackson's lifetime, and the last in which he was extensively involved; Jackson co-produced all of the newly remixed tracks.

The prospect of a "second chapter" to Thriller was first publicly discussed on Access Hollywood in late 2006. Jackson said he would discuss the idea with collaborator will.i.am. Thriller 25 was released in Australia on February 8, 2008, internationally on February 11, 2008, and in the United States on February 12, 2008, by Epic Records, Legacy Recordings and MJJ Productions. To help promote Thriller 25, Jackson's website was recreated and accounts on both MySpace and Facebook were set up. On February 3, 2008, a SoBe advertisement was aired during Super Bowl XLII to an audience of over 95 million viewers. The ad aired again at the 50th Annual Grammy Awards on February 10, 2008.

Thriller 25 debuted at number one on the Billboard Top Pop Catalog Albums chart and in nine other countries. It was a commercial success, selling three million copies worldwide by Jackson's death in June 2009. It also received critical acclaim, although reviewers generally found the new material less compelling than the original album. Thriller 25 was the best-selling catalog album in the US of 2008. Two singles, "The Girl Is Mine 2008" and "Wanna Be Startin' Somethin' 2008", were released from the album to moderate success, and a number of the other remixes charted despite no physical release.

== Background ==
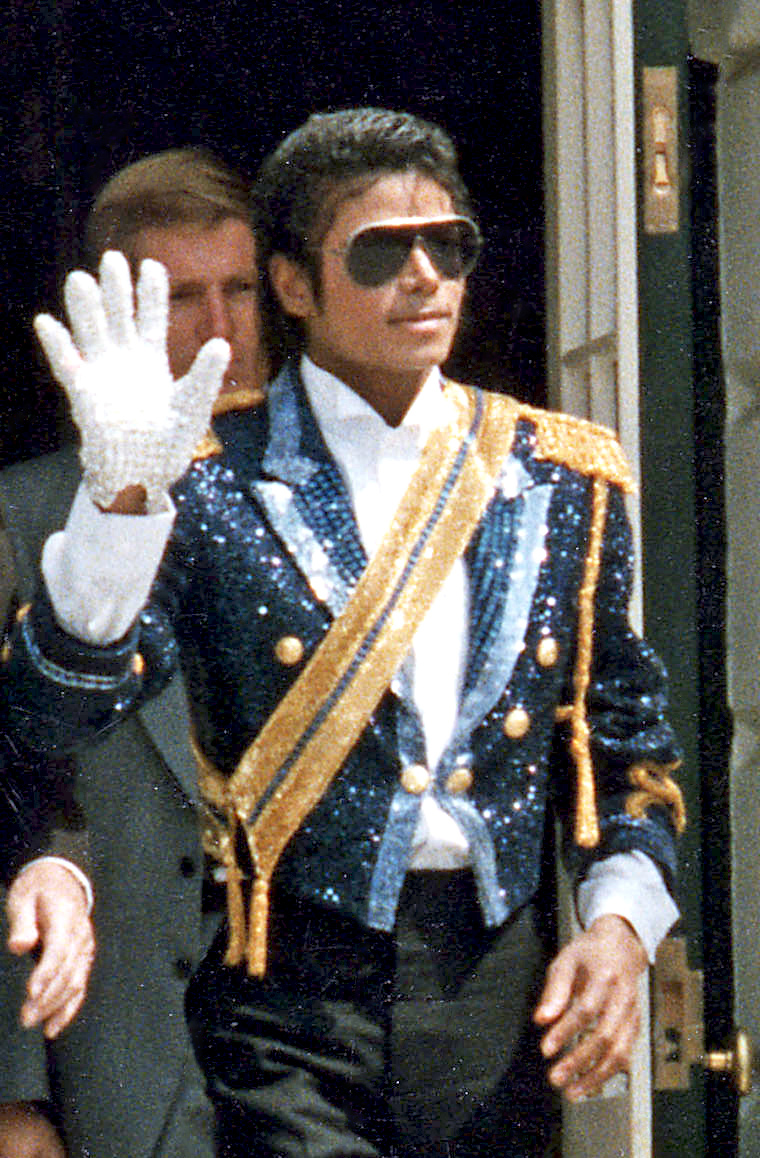
Jackson in 1984

Jackson released his sixth studio album, Thriller, on November 30, 1982. With sales estimated at more than 70 million copies worldwide (Note: Representatives for Sony and Jackson's estate say that Thriller has sold 105 million copies globally. Although sales estimates for Thriller have been as high as 110 million copies, these sales figures are unreliable according to various music specialists.), Thriller became the world's best-selling album of all time; it was the first album in history to yield seven top-ten singles. Its success established Jackson as a dominant figure in pop music and an international pop-culture icon.

Jackson was asked about a "second chapter" to Thriller on Access Hollywood in late 2006. He said he would discuss it with collaborator will.i.am, but had not yet considered it, commenting, "No I haven't really thought about it in that way but I would give it more thought. We haven't really discussed it yet, on that level, but I'm sure at some point we will. But it's a great thought." Jackson served as executive producer; the album's release was announced in an Epic Records press release on November 30, 2007.

== Release ==
"Carousel"
"Carousel", an example of an exclusive track on the deluxe edition of Thriller 25.

Thriller 25 was released on CD and vinyl with seven bonus tracks: the previously unreleased ballad "For All Time" (with backing provided by Toto), Vincent Price's voice-over and five remixes featuring contemporary artists Fergie and Akon. It also included a DVD featuring three award-winning music videos, the Emmy-nominated Motown 25 "Billie Jean" performance, and a booklet with a message from Jackson. "For All Time" was reportedly recorded in 1982, although leaked versions have often been credited to the Dangerous sessions. Despite this, a new bridge and new background vocals were used in the Thriller 25 release.

On the iTunes Store, Zune Marketplace, and Amazon MP3, a "Super Deluxe Edition" was available with the bonus material from Thriller: Special Edition, "Billie Jean (Underground Mix)", an instrumental "Thriller" mix, an extended "Billie Jean" and a digital booklet. Copies bought in Target, Best Buy, Circuit City and Independent Music Stores in the US feature the bonus tracks "Billie Jean (Four on the Floor Club Mix)", "Thriller (Def Thrill Remix)", "Wanna Be Startin' Somethin' (Extended 12" Mix)" and "Billie Jean (Four on the Floor Radio Mix)" respectively. Sony also released a "fan pack" containing Thriller 25 and the Number Ones DVD.

== Promotion ==
To help promote the album, Jackson's website was recreated and accounts on both MySpace and Facebook were set up. On February 3, 2008, a Sobe advertisement was aired during Super Bowl XLII to over 95 million Americans, with Naomi Campbell and Sanam Nazar CGI lizards dancing to "Thriller". The ad aired again at the Grammys on February 10, 2008. In the United Kingdom, Odeon Cinemas ran free Thriller viewings on February 8 and 9, 2008 and television advertisements announcing the release aired throughout Europe.

"The Girl Is Mine 2008" and "Wanna Be Startin' Somethin' 2008" were the first singles released from the album. "The Girl Is Mine 2008" reached number two in Japan, three in Mexico, six in the Netherlands and the top 20 in major European markets. "Wanna Be Startin' Somethin' 2008" reached number three in Sweden, four in New Zealand, eight in Australia, 10 in France and 32 in Canada, but had disappointing sales in America. These were Jackson's first singles since "One More Chance" in 2003. The album track "Beat It 2008" also began charting in European countries, reaching number 26 in Switzerland, 31 in Denmark, 43 in Sweden, 60 in Japan, 74 in Germany, 75 in Austria, and 77 in Canada. as did "Billie Jean 2008", reaching 91 in Germany.

== Critical reception ==
Professional ratings
Review scores
Source	Rating
About.com	5/5 stars
AllMusic	5/5 stars
Blender	4/5 stars
IGN	6.5/10
Pitchfork	7.2/10
PopMatters	9/10
Rolling Stone	5/5 stars
The Times	3/5 stars

Critics responded positively to the album, as they had to the original. Reviews generally noted that the album remained enjoyable 25 years after its initial release. AllMusic explains, "... 'Wanna Be Startin' Somethin'' and 'Billie Jean' remain startling in their futuristic funk and 'Baby Be Mine' ... sounds positively incandescent ..." Rolling Stone gave it a full five stars while giving the original only four, saying: "Thriller [25] has MJ at his breathiest and most salacious ('PYT'), and his most beautifully fragile ('Human Nature', so open and brave it makes 'She's Out of My Life' seem phony)".

MTV said, "... it's pretty rare to see a reissue loaded with as much contemporary appeal as this one", and reacted positively to the new tracks, calling them "silver bars". The new material received further praise; AllMusic described the ballad "For All Time" as "perfectly fine". Rolling Stone described the new version of "Wanna Be Startin' Somethin'" as "actually kind of great — he [Akon] slows it down into a piano ballad, lingering over the easily obscured lyrics." PopMatters stated that the new version of "The Girl Is Mine" was better than the original and lost nothing by removing Paul McCartney. However, most critics agreed that the new versions were not as inspiring as the originals; some even said that the guest artists were the wrong choice. AllMusic notes, "for whatever reason, such Michael-mimicking superstars as Justin Timberlake and Chris Brown did not participate, but Akon, Fergie, and will.i.am did."

== Commercial performance ==
Thriller 25 was a commercial success. It peaked at number one in 11 countries and across Europe. It peaked at number two in the United States and number three in the United Kingdom, and reached the top ten on more than 30 national charts. Thriller 25 spent three weeks at number one in France and two weeks at number one in Belgium. The album has been certified gold in 11 countries, including the United Kingdom. In Poland, the album was certified gold after reaching number six on the chart on its release day. It also became Jackson's highest-charting album in Norway. In France, Thriller 25 received a 2× Gold certification, and in Poland it was certified platinum.

In the United States, Thriller 25 was the second-best-selling album of its release week, selling 166,000 copies, 14,000 short of reaching the number one position. It was ineligible for the Billboard 200 chart as a re-release but entered the Top Pop Catalog Albums at number one (where it stayed for 10 non-consecutive weeks), with the best sales on that chart since December 1996. That November, Thriller 25 spent an 11th non-consecutive week atop the U.S. catalog chart. This brought U.S. sales of the album to 688,000 copies, making it the best-selling catalog album of 2008; it went on to sell 1.2 million U.S. copies and ship three million copies worldwide by Jackson's death in June 2009. This was Jackson's best launch since Invincible in 2001. Like the artist's other albums, Thriller 25 saw a resurgence of interest following Jackson's death.

== Track listing ==
All tracks are written by Michael Jackson, except where noted. All tracks are produced by Quincy Jones, except where noted.

Standard edition
No.	Title	Writer(s)	Producer(s)	Length
1.	"Wanna Be Startin' Somethin'"		Quincy Jones; Jackson^{[a]}	6:02
2.	"Baby Be Mine"	Rod Temperton		4:20
3.	"The Girl Is Mine" (with Paul McCartney)		Jones; Jackson^{[a]}	3:42
4.	"Thriller"	Temperton		5:57
5.	"Beat It"		Jones; Jackson^{[a]}	4:18
6.	"Billie Jean"		Jones; Jackson^{[a]}	4:54
7.	"Human Nature"	Steve Porcaro; John Bettis		4:06
8.	"P.Y.T. (Pretty Young Thing)"	James Ingram; Jones		3:59
9.	"The Lady in My Life"	Temperton		4:59
10.	"Vincent Price Excerpt from "Thriller" Voice-Over Session"	Temperton		0:24
11.	"The Girl Is Mine 2008" (with will.i.am)	Jackson; William Adams; Keith Harris	Jackson; will.i.am	3:10
12.	"P.Y.T. (Pretty Young Thing) 2008" (with will.i.am)	Jackson; Adams; Harris	Jackson; will.i.am	4:21
13.	"Wanna Be Startin' Somethin' 2008" (with Akon)	Jackson; Aliaune Thiam; Giorgio Tuinfort	Jackson; Akon; Tuinfort	4:14
14.	"Beat It 2008" (with Fergie)		Jackson; will.i.am	4:11
15.	"Billie Jean 2008" (Kanye West Mix)		Jackson; Kanye West; Anthony Kilhoffer	4:36
16.	"For All Time" (previously unreleased, recorded in 1990 during Dangerous album sessions and finished mixing in late 2007)	Porcaro; Michael Sherwood	Jackson	4:04
Total length:				67:17

Japanese bonus track
No.	Title	Writer(s)	Length
17.	"Got the Hots" (previously unreleased, recorded 1981–1982 during Thriller sessions)	Temperton	4:27
Total length:			71:44

iTunes bonus track
No.	Title	Producer(s)	Length
17.	"Billie Jean" (Long Version)	Jones; Jackson^{[a]}	6:23
Total length:			73:40

Circuit City bonus track
No.	Title	Producer(s)	Length
17.	"Wanna Be Startin' Somethin'" (1982 Dance Mix)	Jones; Jackson^{[a]}	6:32
Total length:			73:49

Target bonus track
No.	Title	Producer(s)	Length
17.	"Billie Jean" (1982 Club Remix)	Jones; Jackson^{[a]}	6:28
Total length:			73:45

Best Buy bonus track
No.	Title	Writer(s)	Length
17.	"Thriller" (1982 Def Remix)	Temperton	7:21
Total length:			74:38

Independent US Music Store bonus track
No.	Title	Producer(s)	Length
17.	"Billie Jean" (1982 Radio Edit Remix)	Jones; Jackson^{[a]}	4:40
Total length:			71:57

Deluxe edition digital bonus tracks
No.	Title	Writer(s)	Producer(s)	Length
17.	"Quincy Jones Interview #1"			2:19
18.	"Someone in the Dark"	Alan Bergman; Marilyn Bergman; Temperton		4:47
19.	"Quincy Jones Interview #2"			2:04
20.	"Billie Jean" (Home Demo from 1981)		Jackson	2:20
21.	"Quincy Jones Interview #3"			3:10
22.	"Rod Temperton Interview #1"			4:03
23.	"Quincy Jones Interview #4"			1:32
24.	"Voice-Over Session from "Thriller""	Temperton		2:52
25.	"Rod Temperton Interview #2"			1:56
26.	"Quincy Jones Interview #5"			2:01
27.	"Carousel"	Michael Sembello; Don Freeman		1:49
28.	"Quincy Jones Interview #6"			1:17
29.	"Billie Jean" (Underground Mix)		Jones; Jackson^{[a]}	6:40
30.	"Thriller" (Instrumental)	Temperton		5:57
Total length:				109:44

DVD: Thriller Music Videos and Live Performance
No.	Title	Writer(s)	Director(s)	Length
1.	"Billie Jean"		Steve Barron	4:56
2.	"Beat It"		Bob Giraldi	4:59
3.	"Thriller"	Temperton	John Landis	13:43
4.	"Billie Jean" (Live from Motown 25: Yesterday, Today, Forever)			4:57
Total length:				28:30

Notes

- ^{^[a]} signifies a co-producer
- "Got the Hots" was re-recorded as "Baby's Got It Bad" for Siedah Garrett's 1988 album Kiss of Life; Rod Temperton and Garrett are credited as the updated song's composers.
- The Target, Best Buy, and Independent US Music Store bonus track editions were labeled incorrectly with "Billie Jean (1982 Club Remix)", "Thriller (1982 Def Remix)", and "Billie Jean (1982 Radio Edit Mix)" respectively. These mixes were actually made in 1992, as part of a remix project by Jackson and various DJs in the early '90s.
- The Target, Best Buy, Circuit City, and Independent US Music Store releases do not mention the bonus tracks in their album booklets, but they do appear as separate tracks on the CDs. The bonus tracks are only mentioned on a sticker that appears with these respective releases.

=== Thriller 25: Limited Japanese Single Collection ===
On March 28, 2008, a limited edition of Thriller 25 was released in Japan. The limited-edition box set contains 14 tracks divided among seven CD singles from the Thriller album, with two tracks on each CD: the A-side, the main single from the original album, and a B-side.

Each CD is housed in a mini-LP replica cardboard sleeve featuring the original Japanese artwork, Sony inner sleeves, and "vinyl look" discs. The set is packaged in a glossy 5-inch picture box with a Japanese and English lyric booklet and a gold "King of Pop" obi strip).

CD 1

1. "The Girl Is Mine" (with Paul McCartney) – 3:41
2. "Can't Get Outta the Rain" – 4:08

CD 2

1. "Billie Jean" – 4:53
2. "It's the Falling in Love" – 3:48

CD 3

1. "Beat It" – 4:17
2. "Get on the Floor" (Album Version #2) – 4:39

CD 4

1. "Wanna Be Startin' Somethin'" (7" Edit) – 4:17
2. "Wanna Be Startin' Somethin'" (7" Instrumental) – 4:17

CD 5

1. "Human Nature" (Album Edit) – 3:45
2. "Baby Be Mine" – 4:20

CD 6

1. "P.Y.T. (Pretty Young Thing)" – 4:00
2. "Workin' Day and Night" (Edited Version) (with The Jacksons, live recording from the 1981 album The Jacksons Live!) – 4:26

CD 7

1. "Thriller" (Special Edit) – 4:39
2. "Things I Do for You" (Edited Version) (with The Jacksons, live recording from the 1981 album The Jacksons Live!) – 3:37

== Personnel ==
- Executive producer: Michael Jackson

"The Girl Is Mine 2008"

- Keyboards and synths: Keith Harris
- Producer/engineer/mixer/drums/keys: will.i.am

"P.Y.T. (Pretty Young Thing) 2008"

- Keyboards and synths: Harris
- Saxophone: Tim Izo
- Trumpets: Printz Board
- Background vocals: Martii García and Simone Battle
- Producer/engineer/drums/keys: will.i.am

"Wanna Be Startin' Somethin' 2008"

- Instrumentation and programming: Akon and Giorgio Tuinfort
- Tracking engineer: Padraic Kerin
- Mixer: Dylan "3-D" Dresdow
- Producers: Jackson, Akon and Tuinfort

"Beat It 2008"

- Producer/drums/synths/keys: will.i.am
- Engineers: Kerin, Dresdow and will.i.am

"Billie Jean 2008"

- Engineers/mixers: Anthony Kilhoffer, Dresdow, Alex Dromgoole, Nate Hertwech, Matt Wheeler and Mike Houge
- Keyboards: Jeff Bhasker, Kilhoffer and Anthony Caruso
- Producers: Jackson, Kanye West and Kilhoffer

"For All Time"

- Recorded by Bruce Swedien
- Keyboards: Steve Porcaro and David Paich
- Guitar: Steve Lukather
- Drums: Jeff Porcaro
- Mixer: Mick Guzauski and Tom Bender
- Producer: Jackson

== Charts ==
=== Weekly charts ===
Chart (2008–2012)	Peak position
Australian Albums (ARIA)	2
Austrian Albums (Ö3 Austria)	5
Belgian Albums (Ultratop Flanders)	2
Belgian Albums (Ultratop Wallonia)	2
Brazilian Albums (PMB)	2
Canadian Albums (Billboard)	2
Czech Albums (ČNS IFPI)	1
Danish Albums (Hitlisten)	2
Dutch Albums (Album Top 100)	2
European Albums (Billboard)	1
Finnish Albums (Suomen virallinen lista)	5
French Albums (SNEP)	1
German Albums (Offizielle Top 100)	2
Greek Albums (IFPI)	7
Irish Albums (IRMA)	2
Italian Albums (FIMI)	6
Mexican Albums (Top 100 Mexico)	1
New Zealand Albums (RMNZ)	1
Norwegian Albums (VG-lista)	1
Polish Albums (ZPAV)	1
Portuguese Albums (AFP)	2
Slovenian Albums (IFPI)	11
Spanish Albums (Promusicae)	2
South Korean Albums (Gaon)	1
Swedish Albums (Sverigetopplistan)	2
Swiss Albums (Schweizer Hitparade)	1
Thai Albums (IFPI)	1
UK Albums (Official Charts)	3
US Top Catalog Albums (Billboard)	1
US Billboard Comprehensive Albums	2

=== Year-end charts ===
Chart (2008)	Position
Australian Albums (ARIA)	37
Belgian Albums (Ultratop Flanders)	37
Belgian Albums (Ultratop Wallonia)	18
Dutch Albums (Album Top 100)	50
European Albums (Billboard)	15
French Albums (SNEP)	22
German Albums (Offizielle Top 100)	79
Italian Albums (FIMI)	65
Swedish Albums (Sverigetopplistan)	60
Swiss Albums (Schweizer Hitparade)	33
UK Albums (OCC)	55

Chart (2009)	Position
Swedish Albums (Sverigetopplistan)	95
Swiss Albums (Schweizer Hitparade)	53
UK Albums (OCC)	196

== Certifications and sales ==
Region	Certification	Certified units/sales
Argentina (CAPIF)	Gold	20,000^{^}
Belgium (BRMA)	Gold	15,000^{*}
Brazil (Pro-Música Brasil)	Gold	30,000^{*}
Canada (Music Canada)	Gold	50,000^{^}
India	—	15,000
Italy (FIMI) sales since 2009	3× Platinum	150,000^{‡}
Mexico (AMPROFON)	Platinum+Gold	120,000^{^}
Netherlands (NVPI)	Gold	30,000^{^}
Norway (IFPI Norway)	Gold	15,000^{*}
Poland (ZPAV)	Platinum	20,000^{*}
Portugal (AFP)	Platinum	20,000^{^}
Spain (Promusicae)	Platinum	80,000^{^}
Sweden (GLF)	Gold	20,000^{^}
Switzerland (IFPI Switzerland)	Gold	15,000^{^}
United Kingdom (BPI)	Platinum	300,000^{^}
United States	—	774,000
Summaries
Europe (IFPI)	Platinum	1,000,000^{*}
Worldwide	—	3,000,000
^{*} Sales figures based on certification alone.^{^} Shipments figures based on certification alone.^{‡} Sales+streaming figures based on certification alone.

== Release history ==
List of release dates, showing country or region, record label, and format
Region	Date	Label	Format
Australia	February 8, 2008	Epic; Legacy; MJJ	CD; LP; digital download
Germany	February 8, 2008	Epic; Legacy; MJJ	CD; LP; digital download
Italy	February 8, 2008	Epic; Legacy; MJJ	CD; LP; digital download
Philippines	February 8, 2008	Epic; Legacy; MJJ	CD; LP; digital download
Europe	February 11, 2008	Epic; Legacy; MJJ	CD; LP; digital download
United Kingdom	February 11, 2008	Epic; Legacy; MJJ	CD; LP; digital download
United States	February 12, 2008	Epic; Legacy; MJJ	CD; LP; digital download
Taiwan	February 15, 2008	Epic; Legacy; MJJ	CD; LP; digital download
Japan	February 20, 2008	Epic; Legacy; MJJ	CD; LP; digital download
Canada	March 11, 2008	Epic; Legacy; MJJ	CD; LP; digital download
France	March 28, 2008	Epic; Legacy; MJJ	CD; LP; digital download
Haiti	March 28, 2008	Epic; Legacy; MJJ	CD; LP; digital download
South Africa	March 28, 2008	Epic; Legacy; MJJ	CD; LP; digital download
Tanzania	March 28, 2008	Epic; Legacy; MJJ	CD; LP; digital download
