= King of Pop (album) =

2008 compilation album by Michael Jackson

Greatest hits album by Michael Jackson
- Released: August 22, 2008
- Recorded: 1979–2001
- Label: Epic
- Producers: Michael Jackson; various

Michael Jackson chronology
Thriller 25 (2008)	King of Pop (2008)	The Motown Years (2008)

Professional ratings
Review scores
Source	Rating
AllMusic	3.5/5 stars

King of Pop is a compilation album by the American singer and recording artist Michael Jackson, released in commemoration of his 50th birthday in 2008. The album title comes from the honorific title Jackson himself acquired approximately 20 years earlier.

The track listing of the album differs significantly across countries because fans in each country where Sony BMG operated national offices were allowed to vote on which songs would appear on that country's edition of the album. The initial pool of songs, which also differed across countries, was selected from Jackson's back catalogue and also included a new "megamix" of five songs from the Thriller album that was created by Jason Nevins. "Billie Jean" is the only song to appear on all versions of the album.

As of 2019, King of Pop has been released in a total of 28 versions; it has not been released in North America. The album's launch was made public on June 20, 2008, with the official announcement of the Australian version. The first version was released was in the Netherlands and in Germany/Switzerland on August 22, 2008. The final release was China's edition on December 18, 2009, following Jackson's death.

== Background ==
Prior to the release of King of Pop, Jackson issued the double-disc album Thriller 25, a 25th anniversary edition of Thriller. It was a commercial success, having done particularly well as a re-issue, peaking at number one in eight countries and Europe. It reached number two in the US, number three in the UK and the top 10 on over 30 national charts. In the US, Thriller 25 was just 14,000 copies short of reaching the peak position, selling 166,000 copies. It was ineligible for the Billboard 200 chart as a re-release, but entered atop the Pop Catalog chart, where it stayed for 10 non-consecutive weeks and had the best sales on that chart since December 1996.

A few months afterward, Sony announced the release of regional editions of the King of Pop compilation, in celebration of Jackson's 50th birthday. The album's title is a reference to the same title Jackson acquired approximately 20 years ago and was also co produced by Jamaican born student and songwriter Dontae Matthews, from Spanish Town, Jamaica. The name "King of Pop" came when actress and friend Elizabeth Taylor presented Jackson with an "Artist of the Decade" award at the 1989 Soul Train Awards, proclaiming him "the true king of pop, rock and soul". MTV, VH1, FOX, and Jackson's record label began marketing Jackson as the "King of Pop" to coincide with the release of Dangerous and the music video for "Black or White", the album's first single.

== Versions ==
=== Belgium ===
King of Pop Belgian Edition

Greatest hits album by Michael Jackson
- Released: August 25, 2008
- Recorded: 1979–2001
- Label: Epic
- Producers: Michael Jackson; various

Michael Jackson chronology
Thriller 25 (2008)	King of Pop Belgian Edition (2008)	The Motown Years (2008)

Two versions of the album were released on August 25, the Het Nieuwsblad Edition and the "BEL RTL" Edition. The BEL RTL Edition is the only version of the album that doesn't contain the single "Black or White" at all. The Het Nieuwsblad Edition is the only version of the album to contain "Beautiful Girl". On July 26, it was announced that the double disc album would be released August 25. Fans could vote for their 5 favorite tracks from a pool of 124, on the web site of the Belgian newspaper Het Nieuwsblad.

Track list – Het Nieuwsblad Edition

Disc 1

1. "Thriller"
2. "Beat It"
3. "Billie Jean"
4. "Bad"
5. "Black Or White"
6. "Smooth Criminal"
7. "Dirty Diana"
8. "Can You Feel It"
9. "Heal the World"
10. "Don't Stop 'Til You Get Enough"
11. "Wanna Be Startin' Something"
12. "Blame It on the Boogie"
13. "I Just Can't Stop Loving You"
14. "Earth Song"
15. "Childhood"
16. "The Girl Is Mine"
17. "Rock with You"

Disc 2

1. "Man in the Mirror"
2. "Liberian Girl"
3. "Blood on the Dance Floor"
4. "The Way You Make Me Feel"
5. "We Are The World"
6. "Baby Be Mine"
7. "Dangerous"
8. "They Don't Care About Us"
9. "Billie Jean 2008 Kanye West Mix"
10. "Human Nature"
11. "HIStory"
12. "Say Say Say"
13. "Remember the Time"
14. "You Rock My World"
15. "Beautiful Girl"
16. "Another Part of Me"

Track list – BEL RTL Edition

Disc 1

1. "Billie Jean"
2. "Beat It"
3. "Bad"
4. "Blood on the Dance Floor"
5. "Say Say Say"
6. "Blame It on the Boogie"
7. "Can You Feel It"
8. "Heal the World"
9. "Don't Stop 'Til You Get Enough"
10. "Earth Song"
11. "Thriller"
12. "Dirty Diana"
13. "Human Nature"
14. "Smooth Criminal"
15. "I Just Can't Stop Loving You"
16. "Rock with You"
17. "Man in the Mirror"

Disc 2

1. "Wanna Be Startin' Something"
2. "Smile"
3. "Remember the Time"
4. "Come Together"
5. "The Girl Is Mine"
6. "Stranger In Moscow"
7. "P.Y.T (Pretty Young Thing)"
8. "Off The Wall"
9. "Liberian Girl"
10. "Ghost"
11. "The Way You Make Me Feel"
12. "Scream"
13. "Childhood (Theme From "Free Willy 2")"
14. "Jam"
15. "They Don't Care About Us"
16. "Leave Me Alone"
17. "We Are Here To Change The World"

=== Japan ===
King of Pop the Japanese Edition

Greatest hits album by Michael Jackson
- Released: September 24, 2008
- Recorded: 1979–2001
- Label: Epic
- Producers: Michael Jackson; various

Michael Jackson chronology
Thriller 25 (2008)	King of Pop the Japanese Edition (2008)	The Motown Years (2008)

On July 18, the Japanese Edition "キング・オブ・ポップ-ジャパン・エディション" (King of Pop – Japan edition) was announced with fans picking from a selection pool of 120 tracks. The compilation was released on September 24 by Sony Music Japan.

Track list

1. "Billie Jean" (single version)
2. "Man in the Mirror" (album version)
3. "Smooth Criminal" (radio edit)
4. "Thriller" (single version)
5. "Beat It" (single version)
6. "Bad" (album version)
7. "Black or White" (album version)
8. "Heal the World" (7" edit)
9. "Rock with You" (single version)
10. "Human Nature" (album version)
11. "We Are the World" (demo)
12. "Say Say Say" (album version)
13. "Scream" (album version)
14. "Remember the Time" (album version)
15. "Off the Wall"

Bonus tracks

1. "Ben" (single version)
2. "Thriller Megamix" (radio edit)

=== Italy ===
"King of Pop – The Italian Fans' Selection"

Greatest hits album by Michael Jackson
- Released: October 3, 2008
- Recorded: 1979–2001
- Studios: SONY & BMG
- Label: Epic
- Producers: Michael Jackson; various

Michael Jackson chronology
Thriller 25 (2008)	"King of Pop – The Italian Fans' Selection" (2008)	The Motown Years (2008)

"King of Pop – The Italian Fans' Selection" was released on October 3. It was the first collection to feature the full version of "Carousel" from the Special Edition of Thriller, and the only version of the album to contain "Tabloid Junkie" and "Morphine".

Track list

Disc 1

1. "Billie Jean"
2. "Black or White"
3. "Man in the Mirror"
4. "Whatever Happens"
5. "Smooth Criminal"
6. "Beat It"
7. "Off the Wall"
8. "We've Had Enough"
9. "Dangerous"
10. "They Don't Care About Us"
11. "Human Nature"
12. "Wanna Be Startin' Somethin'"
13. "Ghosts"
14. "You Rock My World"
15. "Earth Song"

Disc 2

1. "Thriller"
2. "Tabloid Junkie"
3. "Liberian Girl"
4. "Remember the Time"
5. "We Are the World"
6. "Who Is It"
7. "Speechless"
8. "Morphine"
9. "The Way You Make Me Feel"
10. "Bad"
11. "Blood on the Dance Floor"
12. "Rock with You"
13. "Don't Stop 'Til You Get Enough"
14. "You Are Not Alone"
15. "Heal the World"

Bonus tracks

1. "Got The Hots"
2. "Carousel"

=== Sweden ===
King of Pop Sweden Edition

Greatest hits album by Michael Jackson
- Released: October 15, 2008
- Recorded: 1979–2001
- Label: Epic
- Producers: Michael Jackson; various

Michael Jackson chronology
Thriller 25 (2008)	King of Pop Sweden Edition (2008)	The Motown Years (2008)

The Swedish Edition of King of Pop (subtitled The Swedish Hit Collection) is a Michael Jackson compilation album released on October 15, 2008. As in other regions, the track listing was selected exclusively by local fans through a vote organized by Sony BMG and the Metro newspaper to commemorate the artist's 50th birthday.

Track list

The Swedish edition Cd 1
No.	Title	Writer(s)	Album	Length
1.	"Billie Jean Long Version"	Michael Jackson	Thriller	6:20
2.	"Thriller"	Rod Temperton	Thriller	5:57
3.	"Beat It"	Michael Jackson	Thriller	4:18
4.	"Bad"	Michael Jackson	Bad
5.	"Black or White (Remaster Version)"	Michael Jackson, Bill Bottrell	Dangerous	4:16
6.	"Smooth Criminal"	Michael Jackson	Bad	4:17
7.	"The Way You Make Me Feel"	Michael Jackson	Bad	4:58
8.	"Man in the Mirror"	Siedah Garrett, Glen Ballard	Bad	5:19
9.	"Don't Stop 'Til You Get Enough"	Michael Jackson	Off the Wall	6:05
10.	"Blame It on the Boogie"	Michael Jackson	Destiny	3:36
11.	"Dirty Diana"	Michael Jackson	Bad	4:41
12.	"They Don't Care About Us" (Single Edit)	Michael Jackson	HIStory: Past, Present and Future Book I	4:13
13.	"The Girl Is Mine"	Michael Jackson	Thriller
14.	"Heal the World"	Michael Jackson	Dangerous
15.	"We Are the World"	Michael Jackson	We Are the World	7:02
16.	"Liberian Girl"	Michael Jackson	Bad	3:53

The Swedish edition Cd 2

1. "Earth Song"
2. "Can You Feel It"
3. "I Just Can't Stop Loving You"
4. "I'll Be There"

Bonus tracks

1. "Say Say Say"
2. "Ben"
3. "Shake Your Body (Down to the Ground)"
4. "Got the Hots"
5. "Someone Put Your Hand Out"
6. "On the Line"
7. "State of Shock"
8. "We Are Here to Change the World"
9. "One More Chance"
10. "We've Had Enough"
11. "Wanna Be Startin' Somethin' 2008"
12. "Thriller Megamix"

=== Argentina ===
King of Pop Argentina Edition

Greatest hits album by Michael Jackson
- Released: November 11, 2008
- Recorded: 1979–2001
- Label: Epic
- Producers: Michael Jackson; various

Michael Jackson chronology
Thriller 25 (2008)	King of Pop Argentina Edition (2008)	The Motown Years (2008)

On November 11, the Argentine version of the compilation was released. It contains 2 bonus tracks: the song "Come Together" (which is featured in Moonwalker and also the HIStory album, released in 1995) and a radio edit of the Megamix of the Thriller album. Two tracks on the album, "Billie Jean" and "Don't Stop 'Til You Get Enough" were incorrectly named as "Billy Jean" and "Don't Stop Till You Get Enough".

Track list

1. "Billie Jean" – 4:53
2. "Beat It" – 4:18
3. "Black or White" – 4:15
4. "Bad" – 4:07
5. "Heal the World" (7" Edit) – 4:32
6. "Human Nature" – 4:05
7. "Don't Stop 'Til You Get Enough" (7" Edit) – 3:59
8. "Smooth Criminal" – 4:18
9. "Man in the Mirror" – 5:18
10. "I Just Can't Stop Loving You" – 4:12

Bonus tracks

1. "Come Together" – 4:02
2. "Thriller Megamix" (Radio Edit) – 4:07

=== Mexico ===
King of Pop (Greatest Hits Mexican Collection)

Greatest hits album by Michael Jackson
- Released: November 13, 2008
- Recorded: 1979–2001
- Studios: SONY & BMG
- Label: Epic
- Producers: Michael Jackson; various

Michael Jackson chronology
Thriller 25 (2008)	King of Pop (Greatest Hits Mexican Collection) (2008)	The Motown Years (2008)

The Mexican edition, titled King of Pop: Greatest Hits Mexican Collection, was released as a 2-CD compilation album, featuring popular tracks like "Billie Jean," "Thriller," "Black or White," and bonus material, showcasing his enduring appeal in Mexico.

Track list

Disc 1

1. "Beat It"
2. "Rock with You"
3. "Don't Stop 'Til You Get Enough"
4. "Human Nature"
5. "Thriller"
6. "Todo Mi Amor Eres Tu (I Just Can't Stop Loving You)"
7. "Bad"
8. "Dirty Diana"
9. "The Way You Make Me Feel"
10. "Smooth Criminal"
11. "Black or White"
12. "You Are Not Alone"
13. "You Rock My World"
14. "Earth Song"
15. "Blame It on the Boogie"

Disc 2

1. "Say Say Say"
2. "Billie Jean"
3. "Off The Wall"
4. "Shake Your Body (Down To The Ground)"
5. "Can You Feel It"
6. "P.Y.T. (Pretty Young Thing)"
7. "Wanna Be Startin' Somethin'"
8. "Man in the Mirror"
9. "Another Part Of Me"
10. "Who Is It"
11. "Leave Me Alone"
12. "Remember The Time"
13. "In The Closet"
14. "Will You Be There"
15. "They Don't Care About Us"

=== Brazil ===
The Brazilian edition was released on October 17. This is the only version of the album to contain the single "The Girl Is Mine 2008" while "Smooth Criminal" is not present at all.

Track list

1. "Thriller"
2. "Don't Stop 'Til You Get Enough"
3. "Billie Jean"
4. "Black or White"
5. "Heal the World"
6. "Say Say Say"
7. "Beat It"
8. "Rock with You"
9. "Human Nature"
10. "Bad"
11. "You Are Not Alone"
12. "Will You Be There"
13. "The Way You Make Me Feel"
14. "Man in the Mirror"

Bonus tracks

1. "Wanna Be Startin' Somethin' 2008"
2. "The Girl Is Mine 2008"

=== China ===
On December 18, 2009, China received its own version, titled King Of Pop: The China Collection released by Sony Music China.

As opposed to all the other versions, fans in China were not given the opportunity to vote for songs included in China's version, and it was not released in 2008 to celebrate Michael Jackson's birthday, but after his death in late 2009. The songs in China's version were a selection from the Hong Kong Version with the exclusion of "Smooth Criminal," "Don't Stop 'Til You Get Enough," and "Blood on the Dance Floor". Spine of slipcase incorrectly mentions the title as "King Of Pop – The Hong Kong Collection", further confirming its ties with the namesake version.

Track list

1. "Billie Jean"
2. "Bad"
3. "Say Say Say"
4. "Thriller"
5. "Ghosts"
6. "Will You Be There"
7. "Heal the World"
8. "Jam"
9. "Scream"
10. "I Just Can't Stop Loving You"
11. "Black or White"
12. "They Don't Care About Us"
13. "Come Together"
14. "We Are the World" (Demo)
1. "Beat It"
2. "Dangerous"
3. "Dirty Diana"
4. "You Are Not Alone"
5. "Remember the Time"
6. "The Way You Make Me Feel"
7. "Man in the Mirror"
8. "Earth Song"
9. "She's Out of My Life"
10. "The Girl Is Mine"
11. "You Rock My World"
12. "Wanna Be Startin' Somethin'"
13. "Billie Jean 2008"

Bonus track

1. "Thriller Megamix"

=== Finland ===
The Finnish edition was released on October 1.

Track list

1. "Billie Jean"
2. "Thriller"
3. "Beat It"
4. "Smooth Criminal"
5. "Bad"
6. "Earth Song"
7. "Black or White"
8. "Dirty Diana"
9. "You Are Not Alone"
10. "I Just Can't Stop Loving You"
11. "Heal the World"
12. "They Don't Care About Us"
13. "Scream"
14. "Man in the Mirror"
15. "Liberian Girl"
16. "Say Say Say"
17. "Don't Stop 'Til You Get Enough"
18. "Wanna Be Startin' Somethin'"

=== France ===
King of Pop – The French Fans' Selection was released on December 12. This is the only version of the album to contain the single "Cry." The deluxe box set is the only version of the album to contain "The Way You Love Me" and "Rock With You" (in its original LP version).

Track list

Disc 1

1. "Billie Jean"
2. "Black or White"
3. "Beat It"
4. "Off the Wall"
5. "Thriller" (single)
6. "Smooth Criminal"
7. "Man in the Mirror"
8. "Remember the Time"
9. "Human Nature"
10. "Ghosts"
11. "Who Is It"
12. "Blood on the Dance Floor"
13. "One More Chance"
14. "Earth Song"
15. "Heal the World"
16. "Say Say Say" (feat. Paul McCartney)

Bonus track

1. "Thriller Megamix" (radio edit)

Disc 2

1. "Don't Stop 'Til You Get Enough"
2. "Bad"
3. "Wanna Be Startin' Somethin'"
4. "Carousel
5. "Rock with You"
6. "Stranger in Moscow"
7. "The Girl Is Mine"
8. "The Way You Love Me"
9. "Is It Scary"
10. "Childhood"
11. "The Way You Make Me Feel"
12. "They Don't Care About Us"
13. "Dirty Diana"
14. "P.Y.T. (Pretty Young Thing)"
15. "You Are Not Alone"
16. "Speechless"
17. "Whatever Happens"
18. "Cry"
19. "Will You Be There" (radio edit)
20. "Workin' Day and Night"
21. "You Rock My World"
22. "Dangerous"

Bonus track

1. "Got the Hots"

==== Deluxe box set ====
"King of Pop – The French Fans' Selection" – Deluxe Box Set Edition was released on the same day with a 3rd bonus disc.

Track list

Disc 3

1. "Rock with You (Original LP Version)"
2. "Bad (Dance Extended Mix – Includes False Fade)"
3. "Wanna Be Startin' Somethin' (Extended 12" Mix)"
4. "Billie Jean (Original 12" Version)"
5. "Another Part Of Me (Dance Extended Mix)"
6. "The Way You Make Me Feel (Dance Extended Mix)"
7. "Black or White (The Civilles & Cole House/Club Mix)"

=== Germany and Switzerland ===
On July 14, 2008, it was announced that German fans had until July 28 to choose their top 30 Michael Jackson songs from an extensive pool of 121 tracks for their edition of the compilation. The German version of King of Pop was eventually released on August 22. The German pool list contained almost every song Jackson released in his solo career. Notable expansions on the pool choice included: A larger option of tracks from Thriller 25 (2008) and the inclusion of 12 tracks from The Ultimate Collection (2004). There were also 8 tracks included from the singer's time in The Jackson 5/The Jacksons, slightly more than other versions of the compilation. The German edition was also released in Switzerland on the same day.

In Germany, King of Pop is the fourth most downloaded album of all time.

Track list

Disc 1

1. "Billie Jean"
2. "Beat It"
3. "Thriller"
4. "Smooth Criminal"
5. "Bad"
6. "Dirty Diana"
7. "Black or White"
8. "Man in the Mirror"
9. "Earth Song"
10. "Heal the World"
11. "They Don't Care About Us"
12. "Who Is It"
13. "Speechless"
14. "The Way You Make Me Feel"
15. "We've Had Enough"
16. "Remember the Time"

Disc 2

1. "Whatever Happens"
2. "You Are Not Alone"
3. "Say Say Say"
4. "Liberian Girl"
5. "Wanna Be Startin' Somethin'"
6. "Don't Stop 'Til You Get Enough"
7. "I Just Can't Stop Loving You"
8. "Give In to Me"
9. "Dangerous"
10. "Will You Be There"
11. "Scream"
12. "You Rock My World"
13. "Stranger in Moscow"
14. "Rock with You"

Bonus tracks

1. "Got the Hots"
2. "Thriller Megamix"

=== Australia ===
The Australian version was announced by Sony BMG Australia on June 20, 2008, and was released on Jackson's birthday. Starting on June 21, 2008, Australian fans had three weeks to vote for their 30 favourite tracks for the album; made up of Jackson's prior material. Each fan could choose five songs from the pool; made up of all the tracks from Off the Wall, Thriller (2001 special edition, including "Carousel"), Bad (2001 special edition), Dangerous, HIStory: Past, Present and Future, Book I, Blood on the Dance Floor: HIStory in the Mix, Invincible and the track "For All Time" from Thriller 25. The pool of songs also included seven from Jackson's time in The Jackson 5/The Jacksons. These songs were "Blame It on the Boogie", "Can You Feel It", "ABC", "I Want You Back", "I'll Be There" and "Ben". King of Pop was released in two editions: The first was a limited edition digipak that featured the names of selected voters, messages left by the fans and a fold-out poster that follows Jackson through his musical career; The second edition was a standard release of the album without the poster. This is the only version of the album to contain "Sunset Driver", "In The Back" and the single You Can't Win. This Australia version contains the full nine-minute version of Thriller Megamix instead of the radio edit commonly found on other versions. The standard release contains the top 30 with a few bonus tracks, while the digipack release contains the top 20 with more archival tracks, subtitled "From The Closet".

Track list – Standard Edition

Disc 1

1. "Billie Jean"
2. "Man in the Mirror"
3. "Smooth Criminal"
4. "Beat It"
5. "Thriller"
6. "They Don't Care About Us"
7. "Who Is It"
8. "Black or White"
9. "You Rock My World"
10. "Wanna Be Startin' Somethin'"
11. "The Way You Make Me Feel"
12. "Don't Stop 'Til You Get Enough"
13. "Dirty Diana"
14. "Blood on the Dance Floor"
15. "Rock with You"
16. "Stranger in Moscow"
17. "Remember the Time"

Disc 2

1. "Will You Be There"
2. "Give In to Me"
3. "You Are Not Alone"
4. "Bad"
5. "Earth Song"
6. "Speechless"
7. "Human Nature"
8. "Heal the World"
9. "Dangerous"
10. "Blame It on the Boogie"
11. "Ghosts"
12. "Off the Wall"
13. "Butterflies"

Bonus tracks

1. "Say Say Say"
2. "Scream"
3. "Thriller Megamix"

Track list – Digipack Edition

Disc 1

1. "Billie Jean"
2. "Man in the Mirror"
3. "Smooth Criminal"
4. "Beat It"
5. "Thriller"
6. "They Don't Care About Us"
7. "Who Is It"
8. "Black or White"
9. "You Rock My World"
10. "Wanna Be Startin' Somethin'"
11. "The Way You Make Me Feel"
12. "Don't Stop 'Til You Get Enough"
13. "Dirty Diana"
14. "Blood on the Dance Floor"
15. "Rock with You"
16. "Stranger in Moscow"
17. "Remember the Time"

Disc 2

1. "Will You Be There"
2. "Give In to Me"
3. "You Are Not Alone"
  - From The Closet:
4. "Say Say Say"
5. "Scream"
6. "State of Shock"
7. "Got the Hots"
8. "You Can't Win"
9. "Fall Again"
10. "Sunset Driver"
11. "Someone Put Your Hand Out"
12. "In the Back"
13. "We Are the World (Demo)"
14. "One More Chance"
15. "Thriller Megamix"

=== Hungary ===
On July 9, it was announced that Hungarian fans had until July 27, to choose their songs from an extensive pool of 122 tracks, in a two-stage process. The pool list contained almost every song Jackson has released in his solo career. Notably expansions on the pool choice included: A larger option of tracks from Thriller 25 and the inclusion of 12 tracks from The Ultimate Collection (these are not available in the Australian or New Zealand version). In the first round (July 9 – 15) the fans were able to vote for their top 50 tracks. In round two (July 16 – 27) the 50 were cut down to the album track list.

Track list

1. "Billie Jean"
2. "Black or White"
3. "Thriller"
4. "Smooth Criminal"
5. "Earth Song"
6. "Bad"
7. "Beat It"
8. "Dirty Diana"
9. "They Don't Care About Us"
10. "Heal the World"
11. "Remember the Time"
12. "Say Say Say"
13. "Dangerous"
14. "Give In to Me"
15. "You Are Not Alone"
  - Bonus track
16. "Thriller Megamix"

=== Austria ===
On July 20, the Austrian version of the double disc compilation was announced; it was released on Jackson's birthday. The pool list fans got to choose from contained 100 tracks. This is the only version of the album to contain the single "ABC", which is the earliest song on any version of the album.

Track list

Disc 1

1. "Man in the Mirror" – 5:19
2. "Smooth Criminal" – 4:11
3. "Billie Jean" – 4:53
4. "The Way You Make Me Feel" – 4:58
5. "Black or White" – 4:16
6. "Remember the Time" – 3:59
7. "You Are Not Alone" (Single Version) – 4:55
8. "Human Nature" – 4:05
9. "Wanna Be Startin' Somethin'" (Single Version) – 4:17
10. "They Don't Care About Us" (LP Edit) – 4:09
11. "Dirty Diana" – 4:41
12. "We've Had Enough" – 5:45
13. "Give In to Me" – 5:30
14. "Will You Be There" (Radio Edit) – 3:39
15. "Heal the World" (7" Edit) – 4:32

Bonus track

1. "Got the Hots" – 4:27

Disc 2

1. "ABC" – 2:57
2. "Can You Feel It" – 5:58
3. "Say Say Say" – 3:58
4. "Thriller" (Single Version) – 5:12
5. "Bad" – 4:07
6. "Who Is It" (7" Edit) – 4:00
7. "Earth Song" (Radio Edit) – 5:02
8. "Beat It" – 4:18
9. "Rock with You" (Single Version) – 3:23
10. "I Just Can't Stop Loving You" – 4:12
11. "We Are the World" (Demo) – 5:20
12. "Stranger in Moscow" – 5:22
13. "You Rock My World" – 5:09
14. "Scream" – 4:40
15. "Ghosts" – 5:08

Bonus track

1. "Thriller Megamix" (Radio Edit) – 4:07

=== Netherlands ===
On July 22, it was announced that Dutch fans could vote for their favorite Jackson tracks, choosing 5 songs from a list of 100. The release date of the album was August 22. In Netherlands were two versions released, The Limited -bol.com- Collection and The Dutch Collection.

Track list – The Limited – bol.com – Collection

1. "Billie Jean"
2. "Thriller"
3. "Beat It"
4. "Smooth Criminal"
5. "Dirty Diana"
6. "Don't Stop 'Til You Get Enough"
7. "Man in the Mirror"
8. "They Don't Care About Us"
9. "Black or White"
10. "Wanna Be Startin' Somethin'"
11. "Bad"
12. "Ben"
13. "Can You Feel It"
14. "She's out of My Life"
15. "Remember the Time"
16. "Will You Be There"
17. "Who Is It"
18. "I'll Be There"

Track list – The Dutch Collection

Disc 1

1. "Billie Jean"
2. "Thriller"
3. "Beat It"
4. "Smooth Criminal"
5. "Dirty Diana"
6. "Don't Stop 'Til You Get Enough"
7. "Man in the Mirror"
8. "They Don't Care About Us"
9. "Black or White"
10. "Wanna Be Startin' Somethin'"
11. "The Way You Make Me Feel"
12. "Bad"
13. "Earth Song"
14. "Ben"
15. "Heal the World"
16. "Liberian Girl"
17. "Rock with You"

Disc 2

1. "Can You Feel It"
2. "She's out of My Life"
3. "You Are Not Alone"
4. "Stranger in Moscow"
5. "The Girl Is Mine"
6. "Remember the Time"
7. "You Rock My World"
8. "Human Nature"
9. "Give In to Me"
10. "Will You Be There"
11. "Off the Wall"
12. "I'll Be There"
13. "Who Is It"
14. "Blood on the Dance Floor"
15. "Say Say Say"
16. "Blame It on the Boogie"
17. "Ghost"

Bonus track

1. "Got the Hots"

=== Hong Kong ===
On August 6, it was announced that the double disc album would be released August 28. Fans could vote for 10 of their favorite tracks on the web site of Sony BMG Hong Kong.

Track list

1. "Billie Jean"
2. "Bad"
3. "Say Say Say"
4. "Thriller"
5. "Ghosts"
6. "Will You Be There"
7. "Heal the World"
8. "Smooth Criminal"
9. "Jam"
10. "Scream"
11. "I Just Can't Stop Loving You"
12. "Black or White"
13. "They Don't Care About Us"
14. "Come Together"
15. "We Are the World"
1. "Don't Stop 'Til You Get Enough"
2. "Beat It"
3. "Dangerous"
4. "Dirty Diana"
5. "You Are Not Alone"
6. "Remember the Time"
7. "The Way You Make Me Feel"
8. "Man in the Mirror"
9. "Earth Song"
10. "She's out of My Life"
11. "The Girl Is Mine"
12. "You Rock My World"
13. "Blood on the Dance Floor"
14. "Wanna Be Startin' Somethin'"
15. "Billie Jean 2008"

Bonus track

1. "Thriller Megamix"

=== United Kingdom ===
On July 18, the United Kingdom version of the compilation was announced, with a release date of August 25. Sony BMG UK teamed up with GMTV and The Sun allowing fans, until August 10, to pick 18 tracks from the song pool. The pool list, at only 50 tracks, is the least diverse; there were no songs included from Jackson's group career.

Despite the pool conducting a possible 18 tracks, only 17 are included. Most notable is the fact that "Scream" is included on the album, as this song had not appeared on any compilation album in the United Kingdom prior due to legal rights with Janet Jackson's label Virgin Records.

==== Standard Edition ====
Track list

King of Pop UK: Standard Edition
No.	Title	Writer(s)	Album	Length
1.	"Billie Jean" (Single Version)	Michael Jackson	Thriller	4:54
2.	"Bad" (7" Single Mix)	Michael Jackson	Bad	4:06
3.	"Smooth Criminal"	Michael Jackson	Bad	4:17
4.	"Thriller" (Radio Edit [a.k.a. 2003 Edit])	Rod Temperton	Thriller	5:12
5.	"Black or White" (featuring L.T.B.) (LP Version with Intro)	Michael Jackson, Bill Bottrell	Dangerous	4:16
6.	"Beat It"	Michael Jackson	Thriller	4:18
7.	"Wanna Be Startin' Somethin'" (7" Edit)	Michael Jackson	Thriller	4:17
8.	"Don't Stop 'Til You Get Enough" (7" Edit)	Michael Jackson	Off the Wall	3:59
9.	"The Way You Make Me Feel"	Michael Jackson	Bad	4:58
10.	"Rock with You" (7" Single Mix)	Rod Temperton	Off the Wall	3:23
11.	"You Are Not Alone" (LP Edit)	R. Kelly	HIStory: Past, Present and Future, Book I	4:56
12.	"Man in the Mirror"	Siedah Garrett, Glen Ballard	Bad	5:19
13.	"Remember the Time"	Michael Jackson, Teddy Riley, Bernard Belle	Dangerous	4:00
14.	"Scream" (feat. Janet Jackson)	Michael Jackson, Janet Jackson, James Harris III, Terry Lewis	HIStory: Past, Present and Future Book I	4:39
15.	"You Rock My World" (Album Edit)	Michael Jackson, Rodney Jerkins, Fred Jerkins III, LaShawn Daniels, Nora Payne	Invincible	5:08
16.	"They Don't Care About Us" (Single Edit)	Michael Jackson	HIStory: Past, Present and Future Book I	4:13
17.	"Earth Song" (Radio Edit)	Michael Jackson	HIStory: Past, Present and Future Book I	5:02

==== Deluxe box set ====
In the United Kingdom, a three disc version was released on September 29, 2008. The third disc was advertised as featuring "Rarities and Classic 12"s", although many of the mixes were already remastered and re-released on the 2006 boxset Visionary: The Video Singles. This is the only version of the album to contain "Can't Get Outta the Rain", a track that would become more readily available worldwide with the release of Thriller 40 (2022).

Track list

King of Pop UK: Deluxe Edition CD 1
No.	Title	Writer(s)	Album	Length
1.	"Billie Jean" (Single Version)	Michael Jackson	Thriller	4:54
2.	"Bad" (7" Single Mix)	Michael Jackson	Bad	4:06
3.	"Smooth Criminal"	Michael Jackson	Bad	4:17
4.	"Thriller" (Radio Edit [a.k.a. 2003 Edit])	Rod Temperton	Thriller	5:12
5.	"Black or White" (featuring L.T.B.) (LP Version with Intro)	Michael Jackson, Bill Bottrell	Dangerous	4:16
6.	"Beat It"	Michael Jackson	Thriller	4:18
7.	"Wanna Be Startin' Somethin'" (7" Edit)	Michael Jackson	Thriller	4:17
8.	"Don't Stop 'Til You Get Enough" (7" Edit)	Michael Jackson	Off the Wall	3:59
9.	"The Way You Make Me Feel"	Michael Jackson	Bad	4:58
10.	"Rock with You" (7" Single Mix)	Rod Temperton	Off the Wall	3:23
11.	"You Are Not Alone" (LP Edit)	R. Kelly	HIStory: Past, Present and Future, Book I	4:56
12.	"Man in the Mirror"	Siedah Garrett, Glen Ballard	Bad	5:19
13.	"Remember the Time"	Michael Jackson, Teddy Riley, Bernard Belle	Dangerous	4:00
14.	"Scream" (feat. Janet Jackson)	Michael Jackson, Janet Jackson, James Harris III, Terry Lewis	HIStory: Past, Present and Future, Book I	4:39
15.	"You Rock My World" (Album Edit)	Michael Jackson, Rodney Jerkins, Fred Jerkins III, LaShawn Daniels, Nora Payne	Invincible	5:08
16.	"They Don't Care About Us" (Single Edit)	Michael Jackson	HIStory: Past, Present and Future, Book I	4:13
17.	"Earth Song" (Radio Edit)	Michael Jackson	HIStory: Past, Present and Future, Book I	5:02

King of Pop UK: Deluxe Edition CD 2
No.	Title	Writer(s)	Album	Length
1.	"Dirty Diana"	Michael Jackson	Bad	4:41
2.	"Say Say Say" (Paul McCartney featuring Michael Jackson)	Michael Jackson, Paul McCartney	Pipes of Peace	3:55
3.	"Off the Wall"	Rod Temperton	Off the Wall	4:06
4.	"Human Nature"	Steve Porcaro, John Bettis	Thriller	4:06
5.	"I Just Can't Stop Loving You" (7" Edit) (feat. Siedah Garrett)	Michael Jackson	Bad	4:12
6.	"Heal the World" (7" Edit)	Michael Jackson	Dangerous	4:35
7.	"Will You Be There" (Radio Edit)	Michael Jackson	Dangerous	3:40
8.	"Stranger in Moscow" (Album Edit)	Michael Jackson	HIStory: Past, Present and Future, Book I	5:22
9.	"Speechless"	Michael Jackson	Invincible	3:18
10.	"She's Out of My Life"	Tom Bahler	Off the Wall	3:38
11.	"The Girl is Mine" (featuring Paul McCartney)	Michael Jackson	Thriller	3:42
12.	"Butterflies"	Andre Ballard, Marsha Ambrosius	Invincible	4:40
13.	"Who Is It" (7" Edit)	Michael Jackson	Dangerous	3:59
14.	"Ghosts"	Michael Jackson, Teddy Riley	Blood on the Dance Floor: HIStory in the Mix	5:14
15.	"Blood on the Dance Floor"	Michael Jackson, Teddy Riley	Blood on the Dance Floor: HIStory in the Mix	4:13
16.	"Working Day and Night"	Michael Jackson	Off the Wall	5:14
17.	"HIStory" (7" HIStory Lesson Edit)	Michael Jackson, James Harris III, Jimmy Jam and Terry Lewis	Blood on the Dance Floor: HIStory in the Mix	4:10
18.	"Give In to Me" (feat. Slash)	Michael Jackson, Bill Bottrell	Dangerous	5:29

King of Pop UK: Deluxe Edition CD 3
No.	Title	Writer(s)	Album	Length
1.	"Can't Get Outta the Rain" (Single Version)	Michael Jackson	"The Girl is Mine" B-side	4:06
2.	"On the Line"	Michael Jackson, Babyface	The Ultimate Collection	4:55
3.	"Someone Put Your Hand Out"	Michael Jackson, Teddy Riley	The Ultimate Collection	5:25
4.	"Is It Scary" (Single Radio Edit)	Michael Jackson, James Harris III, Jimmy Jam and Terry Lewis	Blood on the Dance Floor: HIStory in the Mix	4:11
5.	"Smile" (Short Version)	John Turner, Geoffrey Parsons	History: Past, Present and Future, Book I	4:10
6.	"Billie Jean" (Original 12" Version (aka Long Version))	Michael Jackson	Thriller 25	6:23
7.	"Wanna Be Startin' Somethin'" (Extended 12" Mix (aka Long Version))	Michael Jackson	"Wanna Be Startin' Somethin'" B-side	6:33
8.	"Bad" (Dance Extended Mix Includes "False Fade")	Michael Jackson	"Bad" 12” single	8:24
9.	"The Way You Make Me Feel" (Extended Dance Mix)	Michael Jackson	"The Way You Make Me Feel" 12” single	7:52
10.	"Another Part of Me" (Extended Dance Mix)	Michael Jackson	"Another Part of Me" 12” single	6:18
11.	"Smooth Criminal" (Extended Dance Mix)	Michael Jackson	"Smooth Criminal" 12” single	7:48
12.	"Black or White" (The Clivillés & Cole House/Club Mix)	Michael Jackson, Bill Bottrell	"Black or White" 12” single	7:37
13.	"Thriller Megamix"	Michael Jackson, Rod Temperton		4:08

=== Greece ===
This 2-CD edition was released on November 17, 2008. Sony BMG Greece teamed up with music television channel Mad TV through which fans cast votes for their favourite songs.

Track list

Disc 1

1. "Billie Jean"
2. "Beat It"
3. "Smooth Criminal"
4. "Bad"
5. "Jam"
6. "Rock with You"
7. "Dirty Diana"
8. "Black or White"
9. "Scream"
10. "Wanna Be Startin' Somethin'"
11. "Don't Stop 'Til You Get Enough"
12. "In The Closet"
13. "Liberian Girl"
14. "The Girl Is Mine"
15. "Stranger in Moscow"
16. "Blood on the Dance Floor"
17. "Dangerous"

Disc 2

1. "Thriller"
2. "Off The Wall"
3. "Wanna Be Startin' Somethin' 2008"
4. "Can You Feel It"
5. "They Don't Care About Us"
6. "Come Together"
7. "Human Nature"
8. "Earth Song"
9. "You Are Not Alone"
10. "The Way You Make Me Feel"
11. "Remember the Time"
12. "Man in the Mirror"
13. "Ghosts"
14. "Invincible"

Bonus track

1. "Thriller Megamix"

=== Malaysia 2 x CD, Compilation ===
The "King of Pop Malaysia" refers to the legendary Malaysian singer Dato' Jamal Abdillah, renowned for his enduring career and influence in the Malaysian music scene, though the global "King of Pop" title universally belongs to Michael Jackson, who also visited Malaysia in 1996 for his HIStory Tour. While Michael Jackson holds the international title, Jamal Abdillah is locally recognized with this moniker, solidifying his iconic status in the country.

Track list

Disc 1

1. "Billie Jean"
2. "Bad"
3. "Say Say Say"
4. "Thriller"
5. "Ghosts"
6. "Will You Be There"
7. "Heal the World"
8. "Smooth Criminal"
9. "Jam"
10. "Scream"
11. "I Just Can't Stop Loving You"
12. "Black or White"
13. "They Don't Care About Us"
14. "Come Together"
15. "We Are the World"
1. "Don't Stop 'Til You Get Enough"
2. "Beat It"
3. "Dangerous"
4. "Dirty Diana"
5. "You Are Not Alone"
6. "Remember the Time"
7. "The Way You Make Me Feel"
8. "Man in the Mirror"
9. "Earth Song"
10. "She's out of My Life"
11. "The Girl Is Mine"
12. "You Rock My World"
13. "Blood on the Dance Floor"
14. "Wanna Be Startin' Somethin'"
15. "Billie Jean Remix" (Nico Miseria, Sandro Jeawock)

Bonus track

1. "Thriller Megamix"

=== Netherlands ===
On July 22, it was announced that Dutch fans could vote for their favorite Jackson tracks, choosing 5 songs from a list of 100. The release date of the album was August 22. In Netherlands were two versions released, The Limited -bol.com- Collection and The Dutch Collection.

Track list – The Limited – bol.com – Collection

1. "Billie Jean"
2. "Thriller"
3. "Beat It"
4. "Smooth Criminal"
5. "Dirty Diana"
6. "Don't Stop 'Til You Get Enough"
7. "Man in the Mirror"
8. "They Don't Care About Us"
9. "Black or White"
10. "Wanna Be Startin' Somethin'"
11. "Bad"
12. "Ben"
13. "Can You Feel It"
14. "She's out of My Life"
15. "Remember the Time"
16. "Will You Be There"
17. "Who Is It"
18. "I'll Be There"

Track list – The Dutch Collection

Disc 1

1. "Billie Jean"
2. "Thriller"
3. "Beat It"
4. "Smooth Criminal"
5. "Dirty Diana"
6. "Don't Stop 'Til You Get Enough"
7. "Man in the Mirror"
8. "They Don't Care About Us"
9. "Black or White"
10. "Wanna Be Startin' Somethin'"
11. "The Way You Make Me Feel"
12. "Bad"
13. "Earth Song"
14. "Ben"
15. "Heal the World"
16. "Liberian Girl"
17. "Rock with You"

Disc 2

1. "Can You Feel It"
2. "She's out of My Life"
3. "You Are Not Alone"
4. "Stranger in Moscow"
5. "The Girl Is Mine"
6. "Remember the Time"
7. "You Rock My World"
8. "Human Nature"
9. "Give In to Me"
10. "Will You Be There"
11. "Off the Wall"
12. "I'll Be There"
13. "Who Is It"
14. "Blood on the Dance Floor"
15. "Say Say Say"
16. "Blame It on the Boogie"
17. "Ghost"

Bonus track

1. "Got the Hots"

=== New Zealand ===
On July 3, it was announced that fans in New Zealand would have until July 20, to vote for their version of King of Pop. In New Zealand, the compilation was released on August 25. Fans could vote for five songs in a pool that differed slightly from the Australian song pool. The songs available from Thriller 25 were different; "For All Time" had been replaced by "The Girl Is Mine 2008" and "Wanna Be Startin' Somethin' 2008". "Todo Mi Amor Eres Tu" from Bad (2001 special edition) was not available. While the Australian pool included seven songs from Jackson's group career, the New Zealand pool had only three: "Blame It on the Boogie", "Can You Feel It" and "State of Shock".

Track list

No.	Title	Writer(s)	Album	Length
1.	"Billie Jean" (Single Version)	Michael Jackson	Thriller	4:54
2.	"Thriller" (Radio Edit [a.k.a. 2003 Edit])	Rod Temperton	Thriller	5:11
3.	"Don't Stop 'Til You Get Enough" (7" Edit)	Michael Jackson	Off the Wall	3:59
4.	"Man in the Mirror"	Siedah Garrett, Glen Ballard	Bad	5:18
5.	"Black or White"	Michael Jackson; rap lyrics by Bill Bottrell	Dangerous	4:18
6.	"Blame It on the Boogie"	Mick Jackson, Dave Jackson, Elmar Krohn	Destiny	3:36
7.	"Beat It"	Michael Jackson	Thriller	4:18
8.	"Smooth Criminal"	Michael Jackson	Bad	4:18
9.	"Bad"	Michael Jackson	Bad	4:08
10.	"Rock with You" (7" Single Mix)	Rod Temperton	Off the Wall	3:20
11.	"The Way You Make Me Feel"	Michael Jackson	Bad	4:58
12.	"Heal the World" (7" Edit)	Michael Jackson	Dangerous	4:32
13.	"Scream"	James Harris III, Terry Lewis, Michael Jackson, Janet Jackson	HIStory: Past, Present and Future Book I	4:40
14.	"Dirty Diana"	Michael Jackson	Bad	4:41
15.	"Remember the Time"	Teddy Riley, Michael Jackson, Bernard Belle	Dangerous	4:00
16.	"They Don't Care About Us" (Single Edit)	Michael Jackson	HIStory: Past, Present and Future Book I	4:13
17.	"Stranger in Moscow" (Single Edit)	Michael Jackson	HIStory: Past, Present and Future Book I	4:05

=== Philippines ===
Sony BMG Philippines and MYX Music Channel announced the Philippine release of the King of Pop. Filipino fans were asked to send their Top 10 all-time favorite Michael Jackson tracks via e-mail. The album was released on August 28, 2008. This is the only version of the album to contain the single Gone Too Soon.

Track list

1. "Blame It on the Boogie"
2. "Don't Stop 'Til You Get Enough"
3. "Rock with You"
4. "Off the Wall"
5. "She's Out of My Life"
6. "The Girl Is Mine"
7. "Thriller"
8. "Beat It"
9. "Billie Jean"
10. "Human Nature"
11. "P.Y.T. (Pretty Young Thing)"
12. "Bad"
13. "The Way You Make Me Feel"
14. "Man in the Mirror"
15. "I Just Can't Stop Loving You"
16. "Smooth Criminal"
17. "In the Closet"
1. "Remember the Time"
2. "Heal the World"
3. "Black or White"
4. "Gone Too Soon"
5. "Dangerous"
6. "Scream"
7. "They Don't Care About Us"
8. "Earth Song"
9. "You Are Not Alone"
10. "Childhood"
11. "Blood on the Dance Floor"
12. "Invincible"
13. "We Are the World"
14. "Wanna Be Startin' Somethin' 2008"
15. "Say Say Say"

Bonus tracks

1. "Got the Hots"
2. "Thriller Megamix"

=== Poland ===
On August 29, it was announced that the double disc album would be released in Poland on October 20. Fans could vote for 20 of their favourite tracks from a pool of 120 on the special web site of Sony BMG Poland. That site was launched on August 29 (on Michael Jackson's 50th birthday) and voting was closed on September 17.

Track list

1. "Billie Jean"
2. "Black or White"
3. "Thriller"
4. "Earth Song"
5. "Remember the Time"
6. "Say Say Say"
7. "Blood on the Dance Floor"
8. "Scream"
9. "Who Is It"
10. "Blame It on the Boogie"
11. "Ghosts"
12. "Rock with You"
13. "Heal the World"
14. "Human Nature"
15. "Liberian Girl"
16. "Dangerous"
1. "Smooth Criminal"
2. "Give In to Me"
3. "Beat It"
4. "Man in the Mirror"
5. "They Don't Care About Us"
6. "Can You Feel It"
7. "Dirty Diana"
8. "You Are Not Alone"
9. "Wanna Be Startin' Somethin'"
10. "You Rock My World"
11. "The Way You Make Me Feel"
12. "Stranger in Moscow"
13. "Bad"
14. "Don't Stop 'Til You Get Enough"
15. "We Are The World"
  - empik.com Bonus track
16. "Thriller Megamix"

=== Portugal ===
The Portuguese edition was released on December 9, 2008.

Track list

1. "Billie Jean"
2. "Black or White"
3. "Beat It"
4. "Bad"
5. "Smooth Criminal"
6. "You Are Not Alone"
7. "Thriller"
8. "Earth Song"
9. "Man in the Mirror"
10. "You Rock My World"
11. "The Way You Make Me Feel"
12. "Heal the World"
13. "Don't Stop 'Til You Get Enough"
14. "Rock with You"
15. "Dirty Diana"
16. "Remember the Time"

=== Russia ===
The King Of Pop (Россия Выбирает) was released on November 17, 2008.

Track list

1. "Billie Jean"
2. "Wanna Be Startin' Somethin'"
3. "We Are The World (Demo)"
4. "Man in the Mirror"
5. "Dirty Diana"
6. "Smooth Criminal"
7. "Black or White"
8. "Who Is It"
9. "Earth Song"
10. "On The Line"
11. "They Don't Care About Us"
12. "Stranger In Moscow"
13. "Blood On The Dance Floor"
14. "Fall Again (Demo)"
15. "Break Of Dawn"
16. "Whatever Happens"
17. "We've Had Enough"

=== Singapore ===
In Singapore two versions were released. One in 2008 with exactly the same track listing as Korean Edition and the other in 2009, which is the French Deluxe Edition track for track.

=== South Korea ===
"King of Pop – The Korean Limited Edition" was released on December 11, 2008. This is the only version of the album to contain the songs "Keep the Faith" and "You Are My Life".

Track list

Disc 1

1. "Billie Jean"
2. "Beat It"
3. "Black or White"
4. "Heal the World"
5. "You Are Not Alone"
6. "Thriller"
7. "Dangerous"
8. "Bad"
9. "We Are the World (Demo)"
10. "Jam"
11. "Man in the Mirror"
12. "The Girl is Mine (With Paul McCartney)"
13. "Remember the Time"
14. "Smooth Criminal"
15. "The Way You Make Me Feel"
16. "HIStory"

Disc 2

1. "Will You Be There (Radio Edit)"
2. "I Just Can't Stop Loving You (Feat. Siedah Garret)"
3. "Rock With You"
4. "Don't Stop 'Til You Get Enough"
5. "Come Together"
6. "Scream (Feat. Janet Jackson)"
7. "Human Nature"
8. "Earth Song"
9. "Dirty Diana"
10. "Wanna Be Startin' Somethin'"
11. "You Rock My World"
12. "She's Out of My Life"
13. "You Are My Life"
14. "Off the Wall"
15. "Keep the Faith"
16. "Smile"
17. "Who is it"
18. "Childhood (Theme From 'Free Willy 2')"

=== Spain ===
King of Pop – Edición Exclusiva España was released in Spain on January 13, 2009. This is the only version of the album to contain the song "Unbreakable".

Track list

1. Thriller
2. Billie Jean
3. Bad
4. Beat it
5. Smooth Criminal
6. Black or White
7. Man in the Mirror
8. The Way You Make Me Feel
9. Remember the Time
10. Don't Stop 'Til You Get Enough
11. They Don't Care About Us
12. Rock With You
13. Blood on the Dance Floor
14. Heal the World
15. Wanna Be Startin' Somethin'
16. Unbreakable
17. We Are the World (Demo)

=== Taiwan ===
On July 31, 2009, King of Pop: The Taiwan Collection released by Sony Music Taiwan. This version released after Jackson's death, and the track listing is exactly the same as the Hong Kong edition.

Track list

1. "Billie Jean"
2. "Bad"
3. "Say Say Say"
4. "Thriller"
5. "Ghosts"
6. "Will You Be There"
7. "Heal the World"
8. "Smooth Criminal"
9. "Jam"
10. "Scream"
11. "I Just Can't Stop Loving You"
12. "Black or White"
13. "They Don't Care About Us"
14. "Come Together"
15. "We Are the World"
1. "Don't Stop 'Til You Get Enough"
2. "Beat It"
3. "Dangerous"
4. "Dirty Diana"
5. "You Are Not Alone"
6. "Remember the Time"
7. "The Way You Make Me Feel"
8. "Man in the Mirror"
9. "Earth Song"
10. "She's out of My Life"
11. "The Girl Is Mine"
12. "You Rock My World"
13. "Blood on the Dance Floor"
14. "Wanna Be Startin' Somethin'"
15. "Billie Jean"

Bonus track

1. "Thriller Megamix"

=== Thailand ===
Track list

1. "Black or White"
2. "Smooth Criminal"
3. "Bad"
4. "Beat it"
5. "Billie Jean"
6. "Thriller"
7. "Don't Stop 'Til You Get Enough"
8. "Wanna Be Startin' Somethin'"
9. "The Way You Make Me Feel"
10. "Off The Wall"
11. "Remember the Time"
12. "You Rock My World"
13. "Give In to Me"
14. "Jam"
15. "Scream (Feat. Janet Jackson)"
16. "Blood on the Dance Floor"
17. "They Don't Care About Us"
1. "We Are the World"
2. "Heal the World"
3. "You Are Not Alone"
4. "Childhood (Theme From 'Free Willy 2')"
5. "Will You Be There"
6. "The Girl Is Mine"
7. "Human Nature"
8. "I Just Can't Stop Loving You"
9. "She's Out Of My Life"
10. "Man in the Mirror"
11. "Rock With You"
12. "Blame It On The Boogie"
13. "Say Say Say"
14. "Earth Song"
15. "Stranger In Moscow"
16. "Todo Mi Amor Eres Tu (I Just Can't Stop Loving You)"
17. "One More Chance"

=== Turkey ===
"King of Pop – The Turkish Collection" was released on November 24.

Track list

1. "They Don't Care About Us"
2. "Smooth Criminal"
3. "Thriller"
4. "Black or White"
5. "Beat it"
6. "Billie Jean"
7. "Remember the Time"
8. "Wanna Be Startin' Somethin'"
9. "In The Closet"
10. "Bad"
11. "Don't Stop 'Til You Get Enough"
12. "Scream"
13. "Who Is It"
14. "The Way You Make Me Feel"
15. "You Rock My World"
16. "You Are Not Alone"
17. "Liberian Girl"
18. "Off the Wall"

=== King of pop Michael Jackson Music CD Greatest Hits Album 10pcs Music Record+5DVD Cosplay Walkman Car Soundtracks Box Collection ===
Track list
1. "Black or White"
2. "Smooth Criminal"
3. "Billie Jean"
4. "They Don't Care About Us"
5. "You Are Not Alone"
6. "Dirty Diana"

=== Comparison ===
The songs included on each international version are summarised below, with their disc and track numbers. (The table can be sorted separately for each country, showing the order of the tracks in that country's compilation; when sorted in ascending order, the rows with contents will appear at the bottom of the table.)

Comparison
Song [Origin]	AUS Stan. —Digi	AUT	BEL Het —RTL	BRA	FRA SGP	FIN	DEU CH	GRE	HKG MYS TWN CHN	HUN	IND	IDN THA	ITA	JPN	MEX	NLD BOL —Dutch	NZL	PHL	POL	PRT	RUS UKR	KOR SGP	ESP	SWE	ARG	TUR	UK	Σ
"ABC" [single by The Jackson 5]		2.01																										1
"Another Part of Me" [from Bad]			2.16 —												2.09													2
"Another Part of Me (Extended Dance Mix)" [single]					3.11																						3.10	2
"Baby Be Mine" [from Thriller]			2.06 —								1.12																	2
"Bad" [from Bad]	2.04 ——	2.05	1.04 —1.03	1.10	2.02	1.05	1.05	1.04	1.02	1.06	1.02	1.03	2.10	1.06	1.07	1.11 —1.12	1.09	1.12	2.13	1.04		1.08	1.03	1.04	1.04	1.06	1.02	27
"Bad (Dance Extended Mix)" [single]					3.08																						3.08	2
"Beat It" [from Thriller]	1.04	2.08	1.02 — 1.02	1.07	1.03	1.03	1.02	1.02	2.02	1.07	2.03	1.04	1.06	1.05	1.01	1.03	1.07	1.08	2.03	1.03		1.02	1.04	1.03	1.02	1.10	1.06	27
"Beautiful Girl" [from The Ultimate Collection]			2.15																									1
"Ben" [single from Ben]														1.16		1.12 —1.14								2.06				3
"Billie Jean" [from Thriller]	1.01	1.03	1.03 —1.01	1.03	1.01	1.01	1.01	1.01	1.01	1.01	1.01	1.05	1.01	1.01	2.02	1.01	1.01	1.09	1.01	1.01	1.01	1.01	1.02	1.01	1.01	1.03	1.01	28
"Billie Jean (Original 12″ Version)" [single]					3.10																						3.06	2
"Billie Jean 2008" [from Thriller 25]			2.09 —						2.15		2.16																	3
"Black or White" [from Dangerous]	1.08	1.05	1.05 —	1.04	1.02	1.07	1.07	1.08	1.12	1.02	1.04	1.01	1.02	1.07	1.11	1.09	1.05	2.03	1.02	1.02	1.07	1.03	1.06	1.05	1.03	1.04	1.05	27
"Black or White (Clivillés & Cole House/Club Mix)" [single]					3.13																						3.12	2
"Blame It on the Boogie" [single by The Jacksons]	2.10 ——		1.12 —1.06									2.12			1.15	—2.16	1.06	1.01	1.10					1.10				10
"Blood on the Dance Floor" [from Blood on the Dance Floor]	1.14		2.03 —1.04		1.12			1.16	2.13		2.14	1.16	2.11			—2.14		2.11	1.07		1.13		1.13				2.15	15
"Break of Dawn" [from Invincible]											2.12										1.15							2
"Butterflies" [from Invincible]	2.13 ——										2.13																2.12	3
"Can't Get Outta the Rain" [single (B-side)]																											3.01	1
"Can You Feel It" [single by The Jacksons]		2.02	1.08 — 1.07					2.04							2.05	1.13 —2.01			2.06					2.02				8
"Carousel" [from Thriller: Special Edition]					3.01								2.17															2
"Childhood" [from HIStory]			1.15 —2.13		3.07							2.04						2.10				2.18						6
"Come Together" [from HIStory]			—2.04					2.06	1.14		1.14											2.05			1.11			6
"Cry" [from Invincible]					2.12																							1
"Dangerous" [from Dangerous]	2.09 ——		2.07 —		2.16		2.09	1.17	2.03	1.13	2.04		1.09					2.05	1.16			1.07						12
"Dirty Diana" [from Bad]	1.13	1.11	1.07 —1.12		2.07	1.08	1.06	1.07	2.04	1.08	2.05				1.08	1.05	1.14		2.07	1.15	1.05	2.09		1.11			2.01	20
"Don't Stop 'Til You Get Enough" [from Off the Wall]	1.12		1.10 —1.09	1.02	2.01	1.17	2.06	1.11	2.01		2.02	1.07	2.13		1.03	1.06	1.03	1.02	2.14	1.13		2.04	1.10	1.09	1.07	1.11	1.08	24
"Earth Song" [from HIStory]	2.05 ——	2.07	1.14 —1.10		1.14	1.06	1.09	2.08	2.09	1.05	2.08	2.14	1.15		1.14	—1.13		2.08	1.04	1.08	1.09	2.08		2.01			1.17	22
"Fall Again" [from The Ultimate Collection]	——2.09																				1.14							2
"Ghosts" [from Blood on the Dance Floor]	2.11 ——	2.15	—2.10		1.10			2.13	1.05				1.13			—2.17			1.11								2.14	10
"Give In to Me" [from Dangerous]	2.02	1.13					2.08			1.14		1.13				—2.09			2.02								2.18	8
"Gone Too Soon" [from Dangerous]																		2.04										1
"Got the Hots" [bonus track from Japanese release of Thriller 25]	——2.07	1.16			2.17		2.15						2.16			—2.18		2.16						2.08				8
"Heal the World" [from Dangerous]	2.08 ——	1.15	1.09 —1.08	1.05	1.15	1.11	1.10		1.07	1.10	1.05	2.02	2.15	1.08		—1.15	1.12	2.02	1.13	1.12		1.04	1.14	1.14	1.05		2.06	24
"HIStory" [from HIStory]			2.11 —																			1.16					2.17	3
"Human Nature" [from Thriller]	2.07 ——	1.08	2.10 —1.13	1.09	1.09			2.07				2.07	1.11	1.10	1.04	—2.08		1.10	1.14			2.07			1.06		2.04	17
"I Just Can't Stop Loving You" [from Bad]		2.10	1.13 —1.15			1.10	2.07		1.11		1.09	2.08			1.06			1.15				2.02		2.03	1.10		2.05	14
"I'll Be There" [single by The Jackson 5]																1.18 —2.12								2.04				2
"In the Back" [from The Ultimate Collection]	——2.12																											1
"In the Closet" [from Dangerous]								1.12			1.11				2.13			1.17								1.09		5
"Invincible" [from Invincible]								2.14										2.12										2
"Is It Scary" [from Blood on the Dance Floor]					3.06																						3.04	2
"Jam" [from Dangerous]			—2.14					1.05	1.09		1.07	1.14										1.10						6
"Keep the Faith" [from Dangerous]																						2.15						1
"Leave Me Alone" [from Bad]			—2.16												2.11													2
"Liberian Girl" [from Bad]			2.02 —2.09			1.15	2.04	1.13					2.03			—1.16			1.15					1.16		1.17		10
"Man in the Mirror" [from Bad]	1.02	1.01	2.01 —1.17	1.14	1.07	1.14	1.08	2.12	2.08		2.11	2.10	1.03	1.02	2.08	1.07	1.04	1.14	2.04	1.09	1.04	1.11	1.07	1.08	1.09		1.12	26
"Morphine" [from Blood on the Dance Floor]													2.08															1
"Off the Wall" [from Off the Wall]	2.12 ——		—2.08		1.04			2.02			2.09	1.10	1.07	1.15	2.03	—2.11		1.04				2.14				1.18	2.03	14
"On the Line" [from The Ultimate Collection]																					1.10			2.10			3.02	3
"One More Chance" [single]	——2.14				1.13							2.17												2.13				4
"P.Y.T. (Pretty Young Thing)" [from Thriller]			—2.07		2.08										2.06			1.11										4
"Remember the Time" [from Dangerous]	1.17	1.06	2.13 —2.03		1.08		1.16	2.11	2.06	1.11	2.07	1.11	2.04	1.14	2.12	1.15 —2.06	1.15	2.01	1.05	1.16		1.13	1.09			1.07	1.13	23
"Rock with You" [from Off the Wall]	1.15	2.09	1.17 —1.16	1.08	2.04 —3.02		2.14	1.06				2.11	2.12	1.09	1.02	—1.17	1.10	1.03	1.12	1.14		2.03	1.12				1.10	20
"Say Say Say" [single]	2.14 ——2.04	2.03	2.12 —1.05	1.06	1.16	1.16	2.03		1.03	1.12		2.13		1.12	2.01	—2.15		2.15	1.06					2.05			2.02	18
"Scream" [from HIStory]	2.15 ——2.05	2.14	—2.12			1.13	2.11	1.09	1.10			1.15		1.13			1.13	2.06	1.08			2.06				1.12	1.14	15
"Shake Your Body (Down to the Ground)" [single by The Jacksons]															2.04									2.07				2
"She's Out of My Life" [from Off the Wall]									2.10			2.09				1.14 —2.02		1.05				2.12					2.10	6
"Smile" [from HIStory]			—2.02																			2.16					3.05	3
"Smooth Criminal" [from Bad]	1.03	1.02	1.06 —1.14		1.06	1.04	1.04	1.03	1.08	1.04	1.06	1.02	1.05	1.03	1.10	1.04	1.08	1.16	2.01	1.05	1.06	1.14	1.05	1.06	1.08	1.02	1.03	27
"Smooth Criminal (Extended Dance Mix)" [single]																											3.11	1
"Someone Put Your Hand Out" [single]	——2.11																							2.09			3.03	3
"Speechless" [from Invincible]	2.06 ——				2.10		1.13						2.07														2.09	5
"State of Shock" [single by The Jacksons feat. Mick Jagger]	——2.06																							2.11				2
"Stranger in Moscow" [from HIStory]	1.16	2.12	—2.06		3.03		2.13	1.15			1.13	2.15				—2.04	1.17		2.12		1.12						2.08	13
"Sunset Driver" [from The Ultimate Collection]	——2.10																											1
"Tabloid Junkie" [from HIStory]													2.02															1
"The Girl Is Mine" [from Thriller]			1.16 —2.05		3.04			1.14	2.11			2.06				—2.05		1.06				1.12		1.13			2.11	11
"The Girl Is Mine 2008" [from Thriller 25]				1.16																								1
"The Way You Love Me" [from The Ultimate Collection]					3.05																							1
"The Way You Make Me Feel" [from Bad]	1.11	1.04	2.04 —2.11	1.13	2.05		1.14	2.10	2.07		1.08	1.09	2.09		1.09	—1.11	1.11	1.13	2.11	1.11		1.15	1.08	1.07		1.14	1.09	23
"The Way You Make Me Feel (Dance Extended Mix)" [single]					3.12																						3.09	2
"They Don't Care About Us" [from HIStory]	1.06	1.10	2.08 —2.15		2.06	1.12	1.11	2.05	1.13	1.09	1.10	1.17	1.10		2.15	1.08	1.16	2.07	2.05		1.11		1.11	1.12		1.05	1.16	23
"Thriller" [from Thriller]	1.05	2.04	1.01 — 1.11	1.01	1.05	1.02	1.03	2.01	1.04	1.03	1.03	1.06	2.01	1.04	1.05	1.02	1.02	1.07	1.03	1.07		1.06	1.01	1.02		1.01	1.04	26
"Thriller Megamix" [new mix of songs from Thriller]	2.16 ——2.15			1.17		2.16	2.15	2.16	1.16				1.17				2.17	2.16					2.16	2.16			3.13	12
"Todo Mi Amor Eres Tu" [from Bad]												2.16																1
"Unbreakable" [from Invincible]																							1.16					1
"Wanna Be Startin' Somethin'" [from Thriller]	1.10	1.09	1.11 —2.01		2.03	1.18	2.05	1.10	2.14		2.15	1.08	1.12		2.07	1.10			2.09		1.02	2.10	1.15			1.08	1.07	20
"Wanna Be Startin' Somethin' (Extended 12″ Mix)" [single]					3.09																						3.07	2
"Wanna Be Startin' Somethin' 2008" [from Thriller 25]				1.15				2.03										2.14						2.15				4
"We've Had Enough" [from The Ultimate Collection]		1.12					1.15						1.08								1.17			2.14				5
"We Are Here to Change the World" [from The Ultimate Collection]			—2.17																					2.12				2
"We Are the World (Demo)" [from The Ultimate Collection]	——2.13	2.11	2.05 —						1.15			2.01	2.05	1.11				2.13	2.15		1.03	1.09	1.17	1.15				13
"Whatever Happens" [from Invincible]					2.11		2.01						1.04								1.16							4
"Who Is It" [from Dangerous]	1.07	2.06			1.11		1.12						2.06		2.10	1.17 —2.13			1.09		1.08	2.17				1.13	2.13	12
"Will You Be There" [from Dangerous]	2.01	1.14		1.12	2.13		2.10		1.06		2.01	2.05			2.14	1.16 —2.10						2.01					2.07	12
"Workin' Day and Night" [from Off the Wall]					2.14																						2.16	2
"You Are My Life" [from Invincible]																						2.13						1
"You Are Not Alone" [from HIStory]	2.03	1.07		1.11	2.09	1.09	2.02	2.09	2.05	1.15	2.06	2.03	2.14		1.12	—2.03		2.09	2.08	1.06		1.05				1.16	1.11	20
"You Can't Win" [single]	——2.08																											1
"You Rock My World" [from Invincible]	1.09	2.13	2.14 —		2.15		2.12		2.12		2.10	1.12	1.14		1.13	—2.07			2.10	1.10		2.11				1.15	1.15	16

Key to color codes of origins
The Jackson 5/Jacksons era (1970–1984)	solo era single (1979–2003)	Off the Wall (1979)	Thriller (1982, and later re-releases)
Bad (1987)	Dangerous (1991)	HIStory (1995)	Blood on the Dance Floor (1997)
Invincible (2001)	The Ultimate Collection (2004)	new track for King of Pop (2008)	

== Charts ==
=== Weekly charts ===
Weekly chart performance
Chart (2008–2012)	Peak position
Australian Albums (ARIA) Australian Collection	5
Austrian Albums (Ö3 Austria) Austrian Edition	1
Belgian Albums (Ultratop Flanders) Belgian Edition	1
Belgian Albums (Ultratop Wallonia) Belgian Edition	1
Danish Albums (Hitlisten) Dutch Collection	35
Dutch Albums (Album Top 100) Dutch Collection	1
European Top 100 Albums (Billboard)	1
Finnish Albums (Suomen virallinen lista) Finnish Collection	14
French Albums (SNEP) French Fans' Selection	104
German Albums (Offizielle Top 100) German Edition	1
Hungarian Albums (MAHASZ) Magyarország kedvenc dalai	2
Irish Albums (IRMA) UK Edition	3
Italian Albums (FIMI) Italian Fans' Selection	1
Japanese Albums (Oricon) Japan edition	2
Mexican Albums (Top 100 Mexico) Mexican Collection	3
New Zealand Albums (RMNZ) New Zealand Collection	6
Polish Albums (ZPAV) Polish Version	1
Portuguese Albums (AFP) Edição Portuguesa	5
Scottish Albums (Official Charts) UK Edition	7
Slovenian Albums (IFPI)	30
South Korean Albums (Circle) Korean Limited Edition	34
Spanish Albums (Promusicae) Spanish Edition	1
Swedish Albums (Sverigetopplistan) Swedish Hit Collection	3
Swiss Albums (Schweizer Hitparade) German Edition	1
UK Albums (Official Charts) UK Edition	3

=== Year-end charts ===
Year	Country	Chart	Ranking
2009	Germany	Media Control End of Year Albums	2
2009	Poland	OLiS Albums Chart	1
2009	Japan	Oricon Albums Chart	12
2010	Europe	European Top 100 Albums	95
2010	Germany	Media Control End of Year Albums	66
2010	Japan	Oricon Albums Chart	51

== Certifications ==
Region	Certification	Certified units/sales
Australia (ARIA)	2× Platinum	140,000^{^}
Austria (IFPI Austria)	4× Platinum	80,000^{*}
Belgium (BRMA)	Platinum	30,000^{*}
GCC (IFPI Middle East) The Hong Kong Edition	Platinum	6,000^{*}
Germany (BVMI)	7× Gold	700,000^{‡}
Hungary (MAHASZ)	Platinum	6,000^{^}
Italy (FIMI)	2× Platinum	140,000^{*}
Japan (RIAJ)	3× Platinum	750,000^{^}
Mexico (AMPROFON)	Gold	40,000^{^}
Netherlands (NVPI)	Platinum	60,000^{^}
New Zealand (RMNZ)	Platinum	15,000^{‡}
Poland (ZPAV)	Diamond	100,000^{*}
Russia (NFPF)	Platinum	20,000^{*}
Spain (Promusicae)	Gold	40,000^{^}
Sweden (GLF)	Gold	20,000^{^}
United Kingdom (BPI)	Platinum	300,000^{^}
Summaries
Europe (IFPI)	Platinum	1,000,000^{*}
^{*} Sales figures based on certification alone.^{^} Shipments figures based on certification alone.^{‡} Sales+streaming figures based on certification alone.

== Release history ==
Region	Date
Germany	August 22, 2008
Netherlands	August 22, 2008
Switzerland	August 22, 2008
Belgium	August 25, 2008
New Zealand	August 25, 2008
United Kingdom	August 25, 2008
Philippines	August 28, 2008
Hong Kong	August 28, 2008
Austria	August 29, 2008
Australia	August 29, 2008
Hungary	August 29, 2008

Region	Date
Japan	September 24, 2008
Finland	October 1, 2008
Italy	October 3, 2008
Sweden	October 15, 2008
Brazil	October 17, 2008
Poland	October 20, 2008
Greece	November 17, 2008
Turkey	November 24, 2008
South Korea	December 11, 2008
France	December 12, 2008
Spain	January 13, 2009
China	December 18, 2009
