= Jermaine (1972 album) =

Studio album by Jermaine Jackson
- Released: July 14, 1972
- Recorded: December 1971 – March 1972
- Genres: R&B; funk; soul
- Label: Motown
- Producers: Johnny Bristol; Gloria Jones & Pamela Sawyer; Jerry Marcellino & Mel Larson; Hal Davis; The Corporation

Jermaine Jackson chronology
Jermaine (1972)	Come into My Life (1973)

Singles from Jermaine
- 1. "That's How Love Goes" Released: July 14, 1972; 2. "Daddy's Home" Released: November 15, 1972

Professional ratings
Review scores
Source	Rating
Allmusic	2.5/5 stars

Jermaine is the debut solo album from American singer Jermaine Jackson, released in 1972, two months after the release of Lookin' Through the Windows. It reached number 27 on the Billboard pop albums chart. The singles, "That's How Love Goes" and "Daddy's Home", peaked at No. 46 and No. 9 on the Billboard Hot 100 singles chart, respectively.

The album was arranged by David Van DePitte, James Anthony Carmichael, David Blumberg, The Corporation, H.B. Barnum and Gene Page. Berry Gordy was the executive producer and Jim Britt responsible for the cover photography.

Record World called the single "That's How Love Goes" a "gentle soul swinger."

== Track listing ==
Side A

1. "That's How Love Goes" (Johnny Bristol, David H. Jones, Jr., Wade Brown, Jr.) - 3:27
2. "I'm in a Different World" (Eddie Holland, Jr., Lamont Dozier, Brian Holland) - 3:06
3. "Homeward Bound" (Paul Simon) - 3:00
4. "Take Me in Your Arms (Rock Me a Little While)" (Holland Jr., Dozier, Holland) - 3:10
5. "I Only Have Eyes For You" (Al Dubin, Harry Warren) - 2:41

Side B

1. "I Let Love Pass Me By" (Bristol, Jones, Jr., Brown, Jr.) - 3:08
2. "Live It Up" (The Corporation) - 3:01
3. "If You Were My Woman" (LaVerne Ware, Pamela Sawyer, Clay McMurray) - 3:40
4. "Ain't That Peculiar" (William "Smokey" Robinson, Warren "Pete" Moore, Marvin Tarplin, Robert Rogers) - 3:12
5. "Daddy's Home" (James Sheppard, William H. Miller) - 3:04
