= Farewell My Summer Love (song) =

Single by Michael Jackson

from the album Farewell My Summer Love
- B-side: "Call on Me" (album version)
- Released: May 1984
- Recorded: September 4–11, 1973: 1984 (overdubs)
- Studio: Motown Recording Studios (Los Angeles, California)
- Genre: Pop; R&B
- Length: 4:21 (album version); 3:41 (single version); 3:38 (original 1973 mix)
- Label: Motown
- Songwriter: Keni St. Lewis
- Producers: Freddie Perren; Fonce Mizell

Michael Jackson singles chronology
"Thriller" (1983)	"Farewell My Summer Love" (1984)	"Girl You're So Together" (1984)

"Farewell My Summer Love" is a song recorded by Michael Jackson in 1973. Written by Keni St. Lewis, it was later released in 1984 as a single from the compilation album Farewell My Summer Love due to the commercial interest that generated from the sales of Jackson's hit 1982 album Thriller.

It hit No. 7 on the UK Singles Chart and was a Top 40 Pop and R&B and Top 20 Adult Contemporary hit in the U.S.

== Reception ==
Cash Box said that "all the vibrancy of the now legendary Jackson vocal style is present on this single."

== Charts ==
=== Weekly charts ===
Weekly chart performance for "Farewell My Summer Love"
Chart (1984)	Peak position
Australia (ARIA)	68
Europe (European Hot 100 Singles)	23
UK Singles (OCC)	7
US Billboard Hot 100	38
US Billboard Adult Contemporary	20
US Cash Box Top 100	34

=== Year-end charts ===
Year-end chart performance for "Farewell My Summer Love"
Chart (1984)	Position
UK Singles (Gallup)	74
