= Greatest Hits (The Jackson 5 album) =

Greatest hits album by the Jackson 5
- Released: December 9, 1971
- Recorded: July 1969 – October 1971
- Genres: Bubblegum pop; soul
- Length: 36:55
- Label: Motown
- Producers: The Corporation; Bobby Taylor; Hal Davis

The Jackson 5 chronology
Goin' Back to Indiana (1971)	Greatest Hits (1971)	Lookin' Through the Windows (1972)

Singles from Greatest Hits
- 1. "Sugar Daddy" Released: November 23, 1971

Professional ratings
Review scores
Source	Rating
AllMusic	4.5/5 stars
Christgau's Record Guide	A−
The Rolling Stone Album Guide	5/5 stars

Greatest Hits is the first greatest hits compilation by the Jackson 5 released on the Motown label in late 1971. The top 10 single "Sugar Daddy" is included as a new track alongside hits such as "I Want You Back" and "I'll Be There". The album has sold over 5.6 million copies worldwide since its release

A quadraphonic mix was released in Japan in 1975 (this quadraphonic mix was released as a folddown to stereo on an LP in November 2019), marking the first and only release of the band's material in surround sound.

== Track listing ==
Side one

1. "I Want You Back"
2. "ABC"
3. "Never Can Say Goodbye"
4. "Sugar Daddy" (recorded April–October 1971, during Maybe Tomorrow and Lookin' Through the Windows sessions, at the Motown Recording Studio, Los Angeles, California)
5. "I'll Be There"
6. "Maybe Tomorrow"

Side two

1. "The Love You Save"
2. "Who's Lovin' You"
3. "Mama's Pearl"
4. "Goin' Back to Indiana"
5. "I Found That Girl"

Tracks 1, 8 from Diana Ross Presents The Jackson 5. Tracks 2, 7, 11 from ABC. Tracks 5, 9, 10 from Third Album. Tracks 3, 6 from Maybe Tomorrow.

== Certifications ==
Region	Certification	Certified units/sales
United Kingdom (BPI)	Silver	60,000^{^}
Summaries
Worldwide	—	5,600,000
