= Girl You're So Together =

Single by Michael Jackson

from the album Farewell My Summer Love
- B-side: "Touch the One You Love"
- Released: 1984
- Recorded: August 1973; 1984 (overdubs)
- Genre: Pop; R&B
- Length: 3:00 (original 1973 mix); 3:12 (1984 version)
- Label: Motown
- Songwriter: Keni St. Lewis

Michael Jackson singles chronology
"Farewell My Summer Love" (1984)	"Girl You're So Together" (1984)	"I Just Can't Stop Loving You" (1987)

"Girl You're So Together" is a song recorded by Michael Jackson in 1973. Written by Keni St. Lewis, it was later released in 1984 as the second single from the compilation album Farewell My Summer Love due to the commercial interest that generated from the sales of Jackson's hit 1982 album Thriller.

The song was not released in the US; it was released in the UK, where it hit No. 33 on the UK Singles Chart. The song is written in the key of Eb and performed at 100 beats per minute.

== Samples ==
In 2003, The Wiggles sampled this song on their track "The Dancing Flowers" for their album Whoo Hoo! Wiggly Gremlins!.

== Charts ==
Chart performance for "Girl You're So Together"
Chart (1984)	Peak position
Europe (European Hot 100 Singles)	68
UK Singles (OCC)	33
