= Skywriter (song) =

- France 7" single

Single by The Jackson 5

from the album Skywriter
- B-side: Ain't Nothing Like the Real Thing: Hallelujah Day (France)
- Released: August 24, 1973 (UK Only)
- Recorded: August – October 1972
- Genre: Rock, soul, pop
- Length: 3:09
- Label: Motown
- Songwriter(s): Mel Larson, Jerry Marcellino
- Producer(s): Hal Davis, The Corporation

The Jackson 5 singles chronology
"Hallelujah Day" (1973)	"Skywriter" (1973)	"Get It Together" (1973)

"Skywriter" is a song written by Mel Larson and Jerry Marcellino, recorded and released by The Jackson 5 in 1973 as the title track from their Skywriter album. As a single, it reached No. 25 on the UK Singles Chart and No. 87 on the Australian Singles Chart.

In 2009 it was remixed by Stargate for The Remix Suite.

== Charts ==
Chart (1973)	Peak position
UK Singles Chart	25
Australian Singles Chart	87
