= Farewell My Summer Love =

Compilation album by Michael Jackson
- Released: May 8, 1984
- Recorded: January – October 1973; 1984 (overdubs)
- Studio: Motown Recording Studios (Los Angeles, California); Sound Factory Studio (Hollywood, Los Angeles, California)
- Genre: Pop; R&B
- Length: 31:00
- Label: Motown
- Producer: Freddie Perren; Fonce Mizell; Hal Davis; Bob Crewe; Tony Peluso; Michael Lovesmith; Steve Barri

Michael Jackson chronology
18 Greatest Hits (1983)	Farewell My Summer Love (1984)	Looking Back to Yesterday (1986)

Singles from Farewell My Summer Love
- 1. "Farewell My Summer Love" Released: May 14, 1984; 2. "Girl You're So Together" Released: 1984

Professional ratings
Review scores
Source	Rating
AllMusic	3/5 stars

Farewell My Summer Love is a compilation album by American singer Michael Jackson, consisting of archived songs that were recorded from January to October 1973. The album was released with updated musical production by Motown Records in the United States on May 8, 1984.

== Background ==
Farewell My Summer Love was released by Motown Records. At the time of the release of the album in 1984, Jackson was already signed to Epic Records. He and the rest of The Jacksons musical group (with the exception of Jermaine) left Motown for Epic in 1975, and Michael also had a solo deal at Epic. Epic Records released Jackson's successful albums Off the Wall (1979) and Thriller (1982). The nine songs contained on Farewell My Summer Love were reportedly "lost" by Motown, but supposedly rediscovered in 1984, around the height of Jackson's career. Although Farewell My Summer Love was released in 1984, it features a younger sounding Jackson as the songs had been recorded over a decade prior.

To give the album a more contemporary sound, Motown remixed the songs and added new musical overdubs. The task of playing the updated sound was given to musicians Tony Peluso, Michael Lovesmith, and Steve Barri. Together with drummer Mike Baird, they recorded new guitar, keyboard, and percussion drum parts for the songs.

For many years, Farewell My Summer Love had not seen a re-release. The 1995 version of the compilation album Anthology features the song "Farewell My Summer Love" in its 1984 remix version, as well as "Melodie", "Don't Let It Get You Down", "Call on Me" and "To Make My Father Proud" in their original 1973 versions. All nine undubbed versions, as well as the 1984 mixes, were finally released on Hello World: The Motown Solo Collection in June 2009. In 2018, Music on CD reissued the album with all nine tracks remastered.

== Singles ==
The title song became a moderate hit, reaching No. 38 on the US Hot 100, and a top 10 hit in the UK, reaching No. 7. A follow-up single, "Touch the One You Love", was released in the US and backed by "Girl You're So Together", but it failed to chart on the US Hot 100. In the UK, "Girl You're So Together" was released as a single, with "Touch the One You Love" on the B-side, and became a moderate hit, reaching the UK top 40.

== Chart performance ==
Upon its release, the album peaked at No. 46 on the US Billboard 200 and No. 9 on the UK Albums Chart and to date has sold approximately one million copies worldwide. On July 9, 1984, the album was certified Gold by the BPI for selling at least 100,000 copies in the United Kingdom.

== Track listing ==
No.	Title	Writer(s)	Length
1.	"Don't Let It Get You Down"	Mel Larson; Jerry Marcellino; Deke Richards	3:01
2.	"You've Really Got a Hold on Me"	Smokey Robinson	3:30
3.	"Melodie"	Larson; Marcellino; Richards	3:21
4.	"Touch the One You Love"	Artie Wayne; George Clinton	2:47
5.	"Girl You're So Together"	Keni St. Lewis	3:09
6.	"Farewell My Summer Love"	St. Lewis	4:21
7.	"Call on Me"	Fonce Mizell; Larry Mizell	3:38
8.	"Here I Am (Come and Take Me)"	Al Green; Teenie Hodges	2:53
9.	"To Make My Father Proud"	Bob Crewe; Larry Weiss	4:04

== Charts ==
Chart performance for Farewell My Summer Love
Chart (1984)	Peak position
Australian Albums Chart	90
Canadian Albums Chart	94
Dutch Albums Chart	47
European Top 100 Albums (Music & Media)	29
German Albums Chart	40
New Zealand Albums Chart	50
UK Albums Chart	9
US Billboard 200	46

== Certifications ==
Certifications for Farewell My Summer Love
Region	Certification	Certified units/sales
United Kingdom (BPI)	Gold	100,000^{^}
United States	—	106,000
^{^} Shipments figures based on certification alone.
