= Sugar Daddy (The Jackson 5 song) =

Single by The Jackson 5

from the album Greatest Hits
- B-side: "I'm So Happy"
- Released: November 23, 1971
- Recorded: April – October 1971
- Genre: Soul; bubblegum
- Length: 2:34
- Label: Motown
- Songwriter: The Corporation
- Producer: The Corporation

The Jackson 5 singles chronology
"Maybe Tomorrow" (1971)	"Sugar Daddy" (1971)	"Little Bitty Pretty One" (1972)

"Sugar Daddy" is a hit single by the Motown quintet The Jackson 5 from their first greatest hits album, released in late 1971.

The song peaked at #3 on the US Best Selling Soul Singles chart and at #10 on the US Billboard Hot 100 pop singles chart in early 1972. "Sugar Daddy" was one of the Jackson 5 hits produced by The Corporation, the group's record production team, composed by Berry Gordy, Freddie Perren, Alphonzo Mizell, and Deke Richards.

Record World said it has "the happy, uptempo sound that made [the Jackson 5] superstars."

The single's B-side is the non-album track "I'm So Happy". Both of these songs were included as bonus tracks on the 2001 re-release of the Jackson 5 studio album Maybe Tomorrow (1971).

== Personnel ==
- Written and produced by The Corporation: Berry Gordy, Alphonzo Mizell, Freddie Perren, and Deke Richards
- Lead vocals by Michael Jackson and Jermaine Jackson
- Background vocals by Michael Jackson, Jermaine Jackson, Tito Jackson, Jackie Jackson, and Marlon Jackson
- Instrumentation by various Los Angeles studio musicians

== Charts ==
Chart (1971–1972)	Peak position
US Billboard Hot 100	10
US Billboard Best Selling Soul Singles	3
