= Mama's Pearl =

1971 single by the Jackson 5

Single by the Jackson 5

from the album Third Album
- B-side: "Darling Dear"
- Released: January 7, 1971
- Recorded: July 1970
- Studio: Hitsville West (Los Angeles, California)
- Genre: Pop; soul
- Length: 3:09
- Label: Motown
- Songwriter: The Corporation
- Producer: The Corporation

The Jackson 5 singles chronology
"Santa Claus Is Comin' to Town" (1970)	"Mama's Pearl" (1971)	"Never Can Say Goodbye" (1971)

"Mama's Pearl" is a song by American pop band the Jackson 5, released in 1971 as the second single from their studio album, Third Album. It was written and produced by the Corporation, a songwriting team that had helped the group score four consecutive #1 singles.

== Chart performance ==
"Mama's Pearl" was one of six consecutive top 5 singles for the group. "Mama's Pearl" went to number two for two weeks on the Billboard Hot 100 behind "One Bad Apple" by The Osmonds, eventually reaching sales of 1 million by March 1971. On the Soul Singles Chart it likewise peaked at number two. Overseas, "Mama's Pearl" peaked at #25 in the UK.

== Song background ==
The song, while sung mostly by Michael featured cameo spots from brothers Jermaine and Jackie. According to a Jackson biographer, "Mama's Pearl" was originally called "Guess Who's Making Whoopie (with Your Girlfriend)". Producer Deke Richards reportedly had the lyrics and title changed to preserve Michael Jackson's youthful, innocent image. The demo version has since been released on the 2012 compilation "Come and Get It: The Rare Pearls".

Record World called it "a fast-paced number...that's already on its way to the top." Cash Box said "Tapping their special keg of pop energy, the Jackson 5 roars into the lists once more with a blazing bubbly-soul surger that has already bounded into the top forty in its first week on the market." Billboard called it a "driving swinger with all the potential of another million seller."

== Personnel ==
- Lead and background vocals: Michael Jackson, Jermaine Jackson, Jackie Jackson, Tito Jackson and Marlon Jackson
- Written, produced, and arranged by The Corporation: Berry Gordy, Alphonzo Mizell, Freddie Perren and Deke Richards
- Instrumentation by various Los Angeles studio musicians

== Charts ==
=== Weekly charts ===
Weekly chart performance for "I Want You Back"
Chart (1971)	Peak position
Canada Top Singles (RPM)	3
New Zealand (Listener)	20
U.K. Singles Chart	25
US Billboard Hot 100	2
US Best Selling Soul Singles (Billboard)	2
US Cash Box Top 100	1

== Sales ==
Region	Certification	Certified units/sales
United States	—	1,000,000
