= The Corporation (record production team) =

American songwriting and record production team

- Origin: Detroit, Michigan, U.S.
- Genres: Motown sound; Rhythm and blues; soul; funk
- Occupations: Songwriters; Record producers
- Years active: 1969–1973
- Past members: Berry Gordy; Fonce Mizell; Freddie Perren; Deke Richards

The Corporation was a group of songwriters and record producers assembled in 1969 by Motown label head Berry Gordy to create hit records for the label's new act, The Jackson 5.

== History ==
The four members of The Corporation—Berry Gordy, Alphonso Mizell, Freddie Perren and Deke Richards—were responsible for the writing, production and arranging of The Jackson 5 number-one hit singles "I Want You Back" (1969), "ABC", "The Love You Save" (both 1970); as well as "Mama's Pearl" and "Maybe Tomorrow" (both 1971). They were also responsible for writing and producing "Bless You", the last hit by Martha and the Vandellas before that group disbanded in 1972.

Like Motown's previous production team, the Clan, which was pulled together to create the singles "Love Child" and "I'm Livin' in Shame" for Diana Ross and the Supremes, The Corporation was intended as a replacement of sorts for Holland–Dozier–Holland, who had left the label in late 1967 to start Invictus Records and Hot Wax Records. Occasionally, they were joined by Perren's wife Christine Yarian.

Gordy created The Corporation because he did not want any more "back room superstars", which the H-D-H team had become. The group members were never billed individually on the original Jackson 5 releases they worked on; even the songwriters' credit was listed as "The Corporation™".

The Corporation disbanded in 1972, after Hal Davis had assumed creative control of the Jackson 5's output. After its disbanding, Motown would credit Gordy, Mizell, Richards, and Perren individually on compilation releases containing Corporation-created Jackson 5 material.

== Songs ==
Gordy, Mizell, Perren, Richards

- "ABC"
- "Bless You"
- "Coming Home"
- "Don't Let Your Baby Catch You"
- "Goin' Back to Indiana"
- "I Found That Girl"
- "I Want You Back"
- "I Will Find a Way"
- "If I Have to Move a Mountain"
- "I'm Gonna Get You"
- "I'm So Happy"
- "It's Great to Be Here"
- "It's So Easy"
- "Live It Up"
- "The Love You Save"
- "Mama's Pearl"
- "Maybe Tomorrow"
- "My Little Baby"
- "Nobody"
- "One More Chance"
- "Petals"
- "She's Good"
- "Sugar Daddy"
- "To Know"
- "We've Got a Good Thing Going"
- "You Made Me What I Am"
- "Your Love Makes It All Worthwhile"
- "You're The Only One"

Gordy, Mizell, Perren, Richards, Yarian

- "Do I Owe"
- "Give Love on Christmas Day"
- "In My Dreams"
- "Is It Him or Me"
- "Love Don't Want to Leave"
- "Love Song"
- "One And The Same"
- "Up on the Housetop"
- "Walk on Don't Look Back"
- "Wings of My Love"
