= Time Is Love (Black Ivory song) =

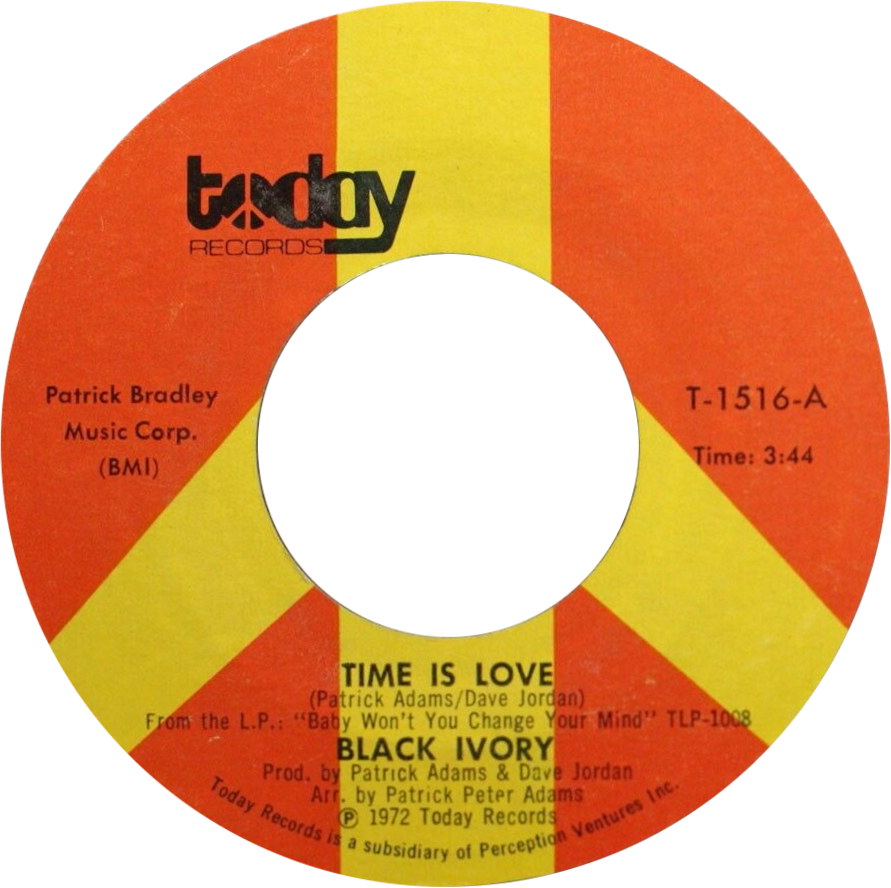
- Side A of the US single

Single by Black Ivory

from the album Baby Won't You Change Your Mind
- B-side: "Got to Be There"
- Released: November 1972
- Studio: Blue Rock Studio
- Genre: R&B; soul
- Length: 3:44
- Label: Today Records/Perception Records
- Songwriter(s): Patrick Adams; Dave Jordan
- Producer(s): Adams; Jordan

Black Ivory singles chronology
"I'll Find Away (Loneliest Man in Town)" (1972)	"Time Is Love" (1972)	"Spinning Around" (1973)

"Time Is Love" is a song written by Patrick Adams and Dave Jordan. It is the fourth single by American soul/R&B vocal group Black Ivory, and became a top 40 Billboard R&B hit single.

== Song information ==
"Time Is Love" was written, produced and arranged by Patrick Adams (Black Ivory's manager) and Dave Jordan. The song was recorded at Blue Rock Studio in New York City and clocked in at 3:44. The song was Black Ivory's fourth single and first release from their second album, Baby Won't You Change Your Mind, which peaked at No. 26 on Billboard Top R&B Albums Chart in March 1973.

The B-side is cover of Michael Jackson's single "Got To Be There", written by Elliot Willensky.

"Time Is Love" spent seven weeks on Billboard soul singles chart peaking at No. 37 on February 24, 1973.

== Critical reception ==
In his review for AllMusic, Andrew Hamilton described the song as "Succulent soul by the New York trio written by Patrick Adams and David Jordan from the fall of 1972".

== Personnel ==
Black Ivory

- Leroy Burgess – lead vocals
- Stuart Bascombe – background vocals
- Russell Patterson – background vocals
