= Stuart Bascombe =

American musician

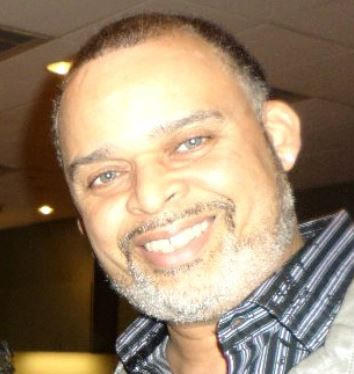
- Bascombe in 2015

Background information
- Born: Stuart D. Bascombe; January 20, 1954 (age 72); New York City, U.S.
- Genres: R&B, disco, soul, funk
- Occupations: Songwriter, record producer, singer, musician
- Instruments: Vocals, keyboards
- Years active: 1968–present
- Labels: Todays/Perception, Buddah, Kwanzaa/Warner Bros.

Stuart D. Bascombe (born January 20, 1954) is an American singer, songwriter, musician, record producer and actor. Bascombe is an original member of the R&B/soul vocal group Black Ivory who recorded a number of R&B hits in the 1970s, including "Don't Turn Around", "You and I", "Time Is Love", "I'll Find a Way (The Loneliest Man in Town)", and their disco hit "Mainline".

== Early life ==
Bascombe was born in Harlem, New York City and grew up there and in the Bronx.

== History ==
=== Career ===
Bascombe, along with songwriter and prolific disco producer Leroy Burgess, and Russell Patterson released their debut album while still attending high school. Black Ivory was first signed to the East Coast label Today/Perception Records, which was run by record producer, Patrick Adams, who was also the group's manager.

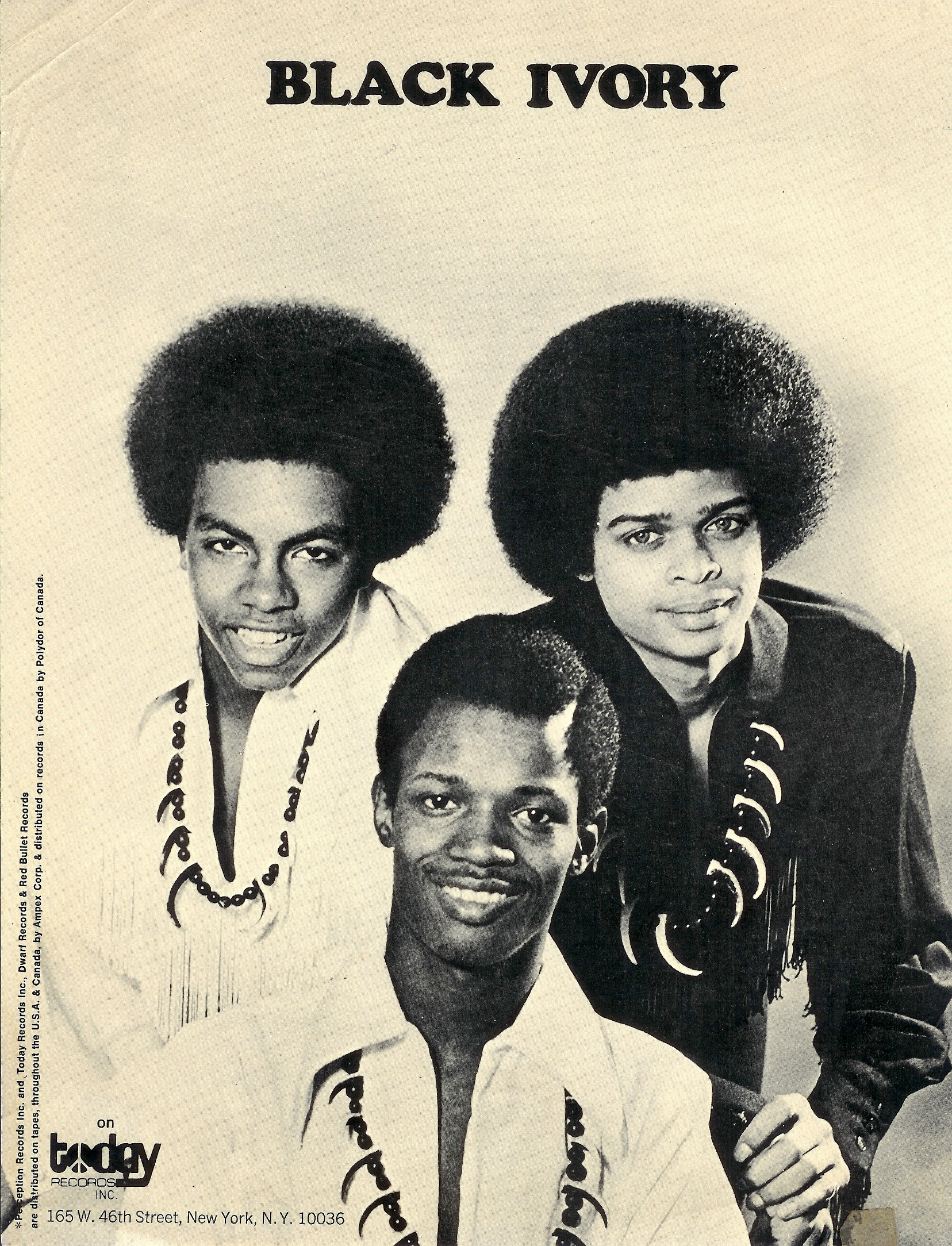
Black Ivory's First Promo Photo 1971

Bascombe with his group had three top 40 R&B hits in 1972, including "Don't Turn Around" No. 38, and "You And I" No. 32 from their hit debut album, "Don't Turn Around", which peaked at No. 13 on the Billboard R&B Album Chart in May 1972. Bascombe is credited as co-writer on four songs from that album. Another single from that album, "I'll Find A Way (The Loneliest Man In Town)" peaked at No. 46 on Billboard R&B Chart. Their single, "Time Is Love" was the third top 40 hit peaking at No. 37. Other charting singles included, "Spinning Around" #45, "What Goes Around (Comes Around)" #44, and "Will We Ever Come Together" #40. Although they recorded several uptempo tracks, such as "Big Apple Rock", "Walking Downtown (On A Saturday Night)", "What Goes Around (Comes Around)" and later, "Mainline" with Russell Patterson as lead singer (written by Burgess, but recorded after he left the group in 1977), they were primarily known for sweet soul ballads.

On March 1, 1972, Bascombe with his group Black Ivory performed on the PBS television show, SOUL!.. On June 1, 1974, Black Ivory were interviewed and performed their single entitled, "What Goes Around (Comes Around)" on season three of Soul train.

In 1976, Bascombe scored the lead role as Moses in a made for TV children's film "Turkey Treasure" which aired on WABC 7. In 1983, Bascombe again reprising the lead role as Moses in the WABC-TV Children's Special, "To Be A Man" which was produced by Neema Barnette and Cliff Frazier. The production won an Emmy for Best Children's Programming on April 23, 1983. Bascombe received a contributing Emmy plaque.

In 1995, the group reunited and returned to the stage on the Classic Soul circuit, featuring all three original members, with Stuart Bascombe doing most of the leads. They have been performing together ever since.

Bascombe is a contributing writer on Wu-Tang Clan rapper, Raekwon's single, Criminology off of his 1995 hit album "Only Built 4 Cuban Linx...". On October 2, 1995, the album was certified Gold and certified platinum on February 24, 2020, by the RIAA.

=== Recent years ===
Bascombe is a contributing writer on the single, "Gettin' Up" on Q-Tip's album, The Renaissance, which was nominated for Best Rap Album at the 52nd Annual Grammy Awards in 2010.

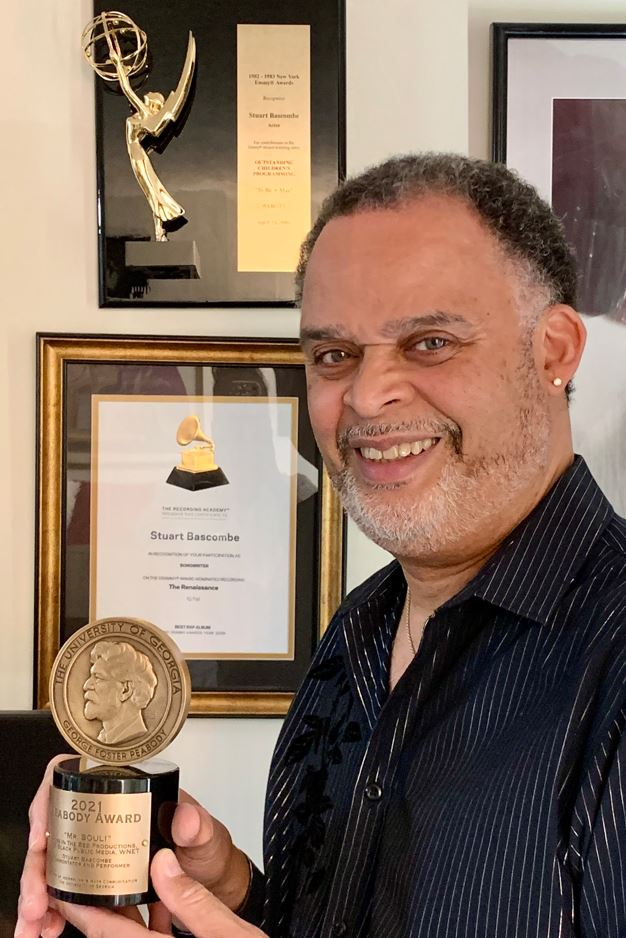
Stuart with his Peabody Award

In 2011, Bascombe with his group released a Christmas single entitled "Snow", and a CD/album (which he co-produced and co-wrote three of the songs) entitled Continuum on their own label, SLR Records LLC.

In 2018, Bascombe was one of the featured commentators in the award-winning documentary, Mr. Soul!! a film based on the host and executive producer of Soul!, Ellis Haizlip, the first "black Tonight Show". Black Ivory's 1972 performance was featured in the movie as well.

In October 2019, Bascombe along with Black Ivory's band-mate, Russell Patterson traveled to the UK and joined Leroy Burgess on stage at the famous London's Jazz Cafe. It was the first time that Black Ivory performed in London together. They were honored with awards to commemorate their 50th Anniversary. In addition, Black Ivory was featured in a 13-page article in the London magazine, The Soul Survivors.

In 2022, Bascombe along with the entire cast of, Mr. Soul! The Movie received Peabody Awards for Best Documentary.

On Aril 27, 2026, Bascombe and his group Black Ivory were inducted into The Atlantic City Walk of Fame presented by, The National R&B Music Society. Mic Murphy of The System inducted them. Tavares, Sister Sledge, Melba Moore, Billy Paul and Roy Ayers were also inducted as part of the 2026 Class.

As of 2026, Bascombe is still writing and performing with his group Black Ivory, the only classic soul/R&B groups from the 1970s, who are still performing with all of the original members from their first release.

== Discography ==
With Black Ivory

=== Albums ===
- Don't Turn Around (1972) (Today Records) No.13 Billboard R&B Chart
- 'Baby, Won't You Change Your Mind (1972) (Today Records) No.26 Billboard R&B Chart
- Feel It (1975) (Buddah Records)
- Black Ivory (1976) (Buddah Records)
- Hangin' Heavy (1979) (Buddah Records/Arista Records)
- Continuum (2011) (SLR Records)

=== Singles ===
- "Don't Turn Around" (1971) No.38 Billboard R&B Chart
- "You and I" (1972) No.32 Billboard R&B Chart
- "I'll Find a Way (The Loneliest Man In Town)" (1972) No.46 Billboard R&B Chart
- "Time Is Love"/"Got to Be There" (1972) No.37 Billboard R&B Chart
- "Spinning Around" (1973) No.45 Billboard R&B Chart
- "What Goes Around (Comes Around)" (1974) No.44 Billboard R&B Chart
- "Will We Ever Come Together" (1975) No.40 Billboard R&B Chart
- "Daily News"
- "You Mean Everything to Me"
- "Walking Downtown (Saturday Night)" (1976)
- "You Turned My Whole World Around" (1978)
- "Mainline"/"Dance" (1979) No.57 Billboard Dance Club Chart
- "I've Got My Eye On You" (1985) No.18 Billboard Dance Club Chart
