= Feel It (Black Ivory album) =

Studio album by Black Ivory
- Released: 1975
- Studios: Bell Sound, New York City; Opal Sound, New York City; Mediasound, New York City
- Genres: R&B; soul; funk
- Length: 31:37
- Label: Buddah
- Producers: Robert John, Mike Gately, Black Ivory

Black Ivory chronology
Baby Won't You Change Your Mind (1972)	Feel It (1975)	Black Ivory (1976)

Singles from Feel It
- 1. "Will We Ever Come Together" Released: December 1974; 2. "Feel It" Released: July 1975; 3. "Daily News" Released: December 1975; 4. "Love Won't You Stay" Released: December 1975

Feel It is the third album by American soul/R&B vocal group Black Ivory, released in June 1975 on Buddah Records. The album was produced by Robert John, Mike Gately, and Black Ivory.

== Album information ==
After the success of Black Ivory's first two albums (both released in 1972 on Today/Perception Records), Don't Turn Around and Baby Won't You Change Your Mind, the group took a three-year break from recording. During that time Black Ivory toured, and changed their management and record company. Now signed to Buddah Records, Black Ivory's first album on the new label entitled, Feel It was produced by Black Ivory (Leroy Burgess, Stuart Bascombe and Russell Patterson), Robert John and Mike Gately. It was recorded in New York City at Bell Sound Studios, Opal Sound Studios, and Mediasound Studios and released in June 1975. The album produced four singles. The first and only single to chart was a top 40 R&B Billboard hit entitled "Will We Ever Come Together", which was released in December 1974 and appeared on the Billboard soul/R&B singles chart for 13 weeks, peaking at No. 40 on April 12, 1975.

== Critical reception ==
Professional ratings
Review scores
Source	Rating
AllMusic	3/5 stars
The Rolling Stone Record Guide	3/5 stars

AllMusic's Andrew Hamilton wrote that the album "ranks as good or better than the previous two... Heavy on ballads, this offering contains three sides written by group members. The cream, however, is John & Gately's 'Will We Ever Come Together,' a vastly underrated ballad."

== Track listing ==
Side one
No.	Title	Writer(s)	Length
1.	"Will We Ever Come Together"	Michael Gately; Robert John	3:30
2.	"Your Eyes Say Goodbye"	Stuart Bascombe; Leroy Burgess; Russell Patterson	4:33
3.	"You're What's Been Missing From My Life"	Gately; John	3:03
4.	"Daily News" (Vocal)	Bascombe; Burgess; Patterson	4:48
5.	"All In a Day's Love"	Gately; John	2:44

Side two
No.	Title	Writer(s)	Length
1.	"Feel It"	Gately; John	3:22
2.	"Warm Inside"	Bascombe; Burgess; Patterson	3:35
3.	"Love, Won't You Stay"	Eugene Lemon	3:07
4.	"Feel It" (Instrumental)	Bascombe; Burgess; Patterson	3:19

== Personnel ==
Black Ivory

- Leroy Burgess - vocals
- Stuart Bascombe - vocals
- Russell Patterson – Vocals

with:

- Greg McCray, Jonathan Cobert, Greg Minniefield, Eugene Lemon, Michael Gately, Leroy Burgess - keyboards
- William Dogan, Clif Nivison, Angel Reca - acoustic and electric guitar
- James Calloway - bass
- Charles Pedro, Dennis Allen - drums
- Charles Pedro, Raymond Ellington, Russell Patterson, Stuart Bascombe - percussion

== Production ==
- Producers – Bascombe, Burgess, Patterson, Robert John, Michael Gately
- Horn and string arrangements – Patrick Adams, Charles Calello
- Keyboard arrangements – Leroy Burgess
- Vocal arrangements – Black Ivory
