= You and I (Black Ivory song) =

1972 song by Black Ivory

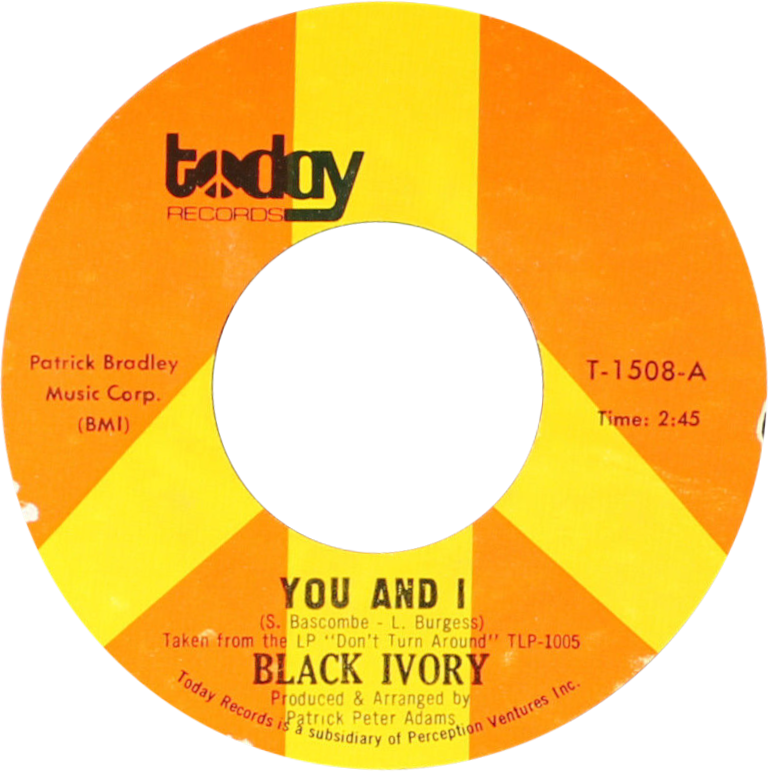
- Side A of the US single

Single by Black Ivory

from the album Don't Turn Around
- B-side: "Our Future?"
- Released: February 1972
- Studio: Sound Ideas Studios
- Genre: R&B, Soul
- Length: 3:57
- Label: Today Records/Perception Records
- Songwriters: Leroy Burgess, Stuart Bascombe
- Producer: Patrick Adams

Black Ivory singles chronology
"Don't Turn Around"	"You and I" (1972)	"I'll Find Away (Loneliest Man in Town)" (1972)

"You and I" is a top 40 single by American soul/R&B vocal group, Black Ivory. The song was written by group members Leroy Burgess and Stuart Bascombe and produced and arranged by record producer, Patrick Adams

== Song information ==
Black Ivory's single, "You and I" is a song from their debut album, Don't Turn Around. The song was written by Leroy Burgess and Stuart Bascombe. It was produced and arranged by Patrick Adams. The group recorded the song at Sound Ideas Studio in New York City, and released in February 1972. Larry Blackmon of the R&B/funk band Cameo was a friend of the group and played the drums on the track. The song entered the Billboard Soul singles chart in late April 1972, spending 6 weeks there and peaking at No.32 on May 20, 1972. The B-side, "Our Future?", was written by Adams and Terry Phillip, and produced by Adams and Black Ivory. The album version of the song clocked in at seven minutes and twenty-seven seconds.

== Covers/samples ==
Rapper Q-Tip sampled the Black Ivory song on his 2008 release, "Gettin' Up" which was the first single from his album, "The Renaissance", that was nominated for Best Rap Album at the 52nd Annual Grammy Awards in 2010.

== Personnel ==
Black Ivory

- Leroy Burgess
- Stuart Bascombe
- Russell Patterson – vocals

Additional personnel

- Patrick Adams – bass, guitar, piano, organ, drums, celeste, Moog synthesizer, timpani
- Larry Blackmon – drums
- Gordon Edwards – bass
- Harry Lookofsky – concert master

Production

- Produced by Black Ivory and Patrick Adams
- Arraneged and conducted by Adams
- Vocal arrangements by Leroy Burgess
