= I'll Find Away (Loneliest Man in Town) =

Song by Black Ivory

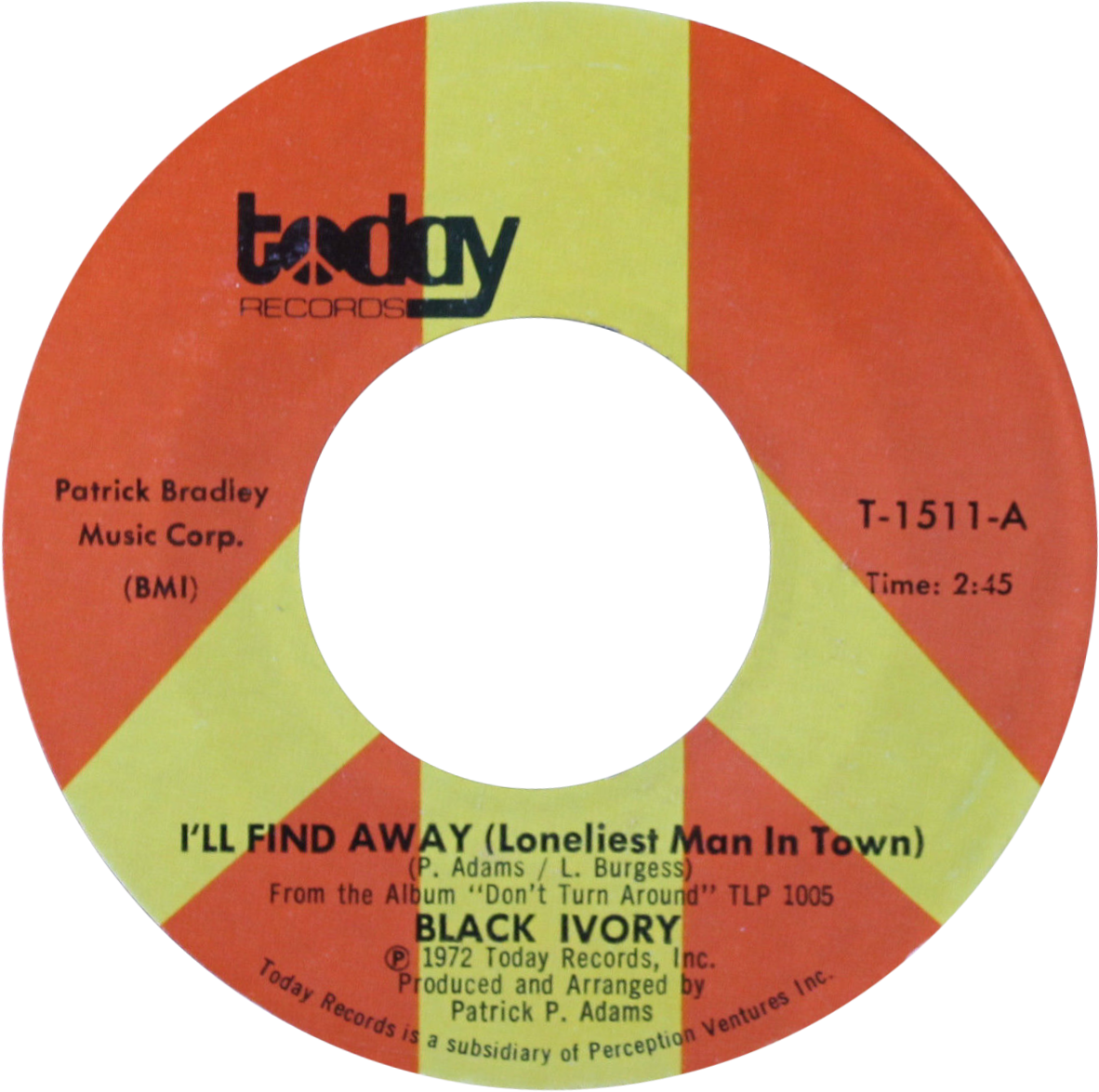
- Side A of the US retail single

Single by Black Ivory

from the album Don't Turn Around
- B-side: "Surrender"
- Released: July 1972
- Studio: Sound Ideas
- Genre: R&B; soul
- Length: 2:45
- Label: Today Records/Perception Records
- Songwriter(s): Leroy Burgess; Patrick Adams
- Producer(s): Patrick Adams

Black Ivory singles chronology
"You and I" (1972)	"I'll Find Away (Loneliest Man in Town)" (1972)	"Time Is Love" (1973)

"I'll Find Away (Loneliest Man in Town)" is a hit single by American soul/R&B vocal group, Black Ivory. The song was written by group member Leroy Burgess and musician Patrick Adams.

== Song information ==
"I'll Find Away (Loneliest Man in Town)" was written by Adams and Burgess. Adams, who was Black Ivory's manager, also produced and arranged the song. The song was recorded at Sound Ideas Studio in New York City and clocked in at 2:45. In July 1972, the song was released as the third single from their Billboard top 20 R&B debut album, Don't Turn Around. The album version of the song is entitled, "I'll Find a Way".

The song entered the Billboard soul singles chart in August 1972, appearing for four weeks and peaking at No. 46 on September 23, 1972. The B-side "Surrender", was written by Adams, Burgess, group members Stuart Bascombe and Russell Patterson. It was produced and arranged by Adams.

== Personnel ==
Black Ivory

- Leroy Burgess – lead vocals
- Stuart Bascombe – background vocals
- Russell Patterson – background vocals

=== Production ===
- Patrick Adams – producer, arranger, conductor
