= Russell Patterson (singer) =

American singer-songwriter

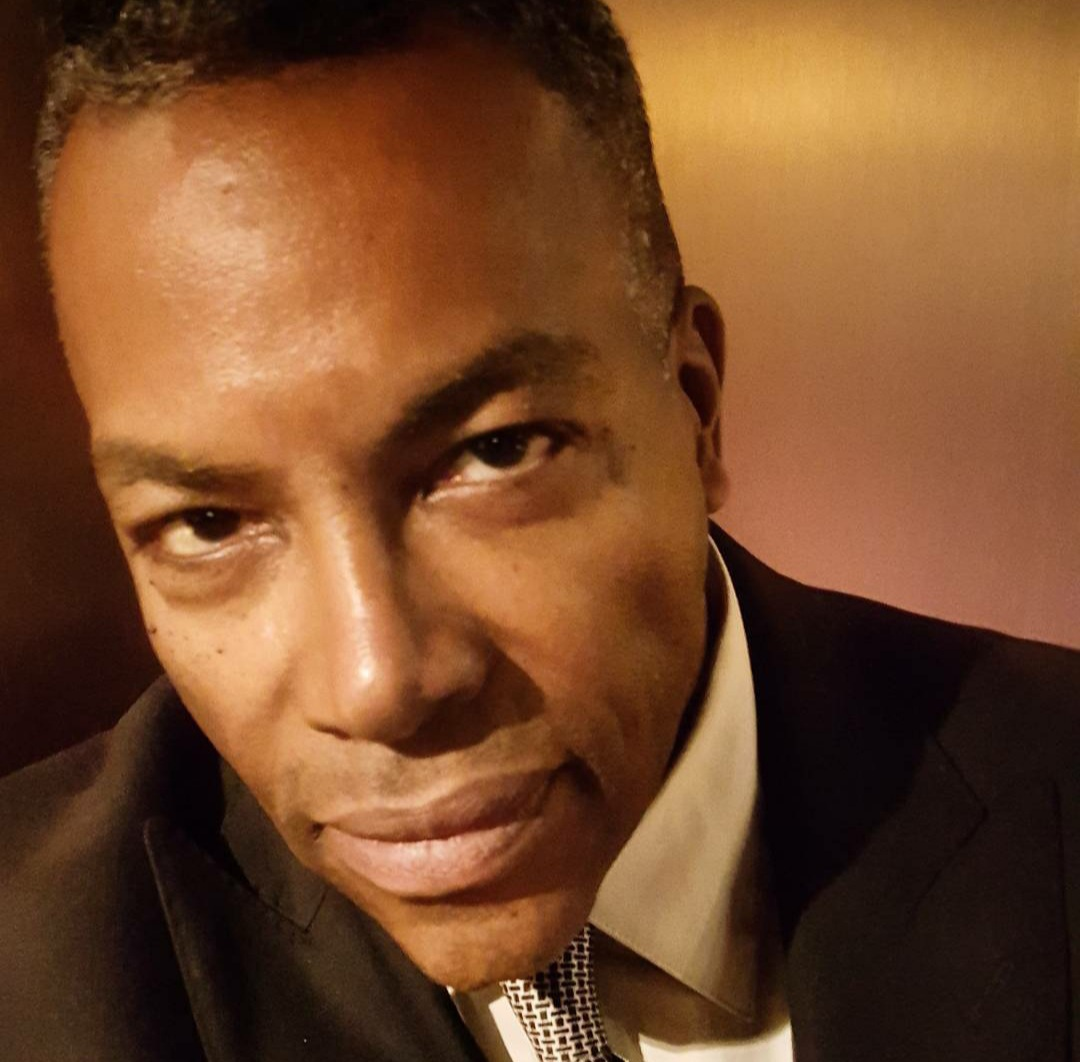
- Patterson on the set of Power at Steiner Studios in 2017

Background information
- Born: Russell Patterson; April 1, 1954 (age 72); New York, New York, United States
- Origin: Harlem, New York City
- Genres: R&B, disco, funk, pop
- Occupations: Vocalist, songwriter, record producer, actor
- Instrument: Vocal
- Years active: 1968–present
- Labels: Todays Records/Perception Records, Buddah Records, Kwanzaa Records/Warner Bros. Records Panoramic Records, Culture Shock Records, BlackRain Records
- Member of: Black Ivory

Russell Patterson (born April 1, 1954) is an American singer, songwriter, recording artist, record producer, and actor. Patterson is an original member of the 1970s R&B group, Black Ivory who recorded a number of R&B hits including, "Don't Turn Around", "You and I", "I'll Find A Way (The Loneliest Man In Town)", "Time Is Love", and "Mainline".

== Early life ==
Patterson was raised by his grandparents in New York City, after his parents separated when he was 2 years old. When his mother remarried, Patterson moved in with them.

== History ==
=== Career ===
in 1970, Patterson became a member of Soul/R&B vocal group, Black Ivory. Along with prolific songwriter and disco producer, Leroy Burgess and Stuart Bascombe they released their first single "Don't Turn Around" in the spring of 1971, while still in high school. The single was recorded at Sigma Sound Studios in Philadelphia, Pennsylvania. Black Ivory was signed to an independent record label, Today/Perception Records and was managed by producer, Patrick Adams, and release their debut hit album, Don't Turn Around early 1971. The album spent 19 weeks on Billboard R&B/Soul Album Chart peaking at #13. The album produced two top 40 singles on Billboard Soul/R&B Chart, "Don't Turn Around" #38 and "You and I" #32. The third single from the album, "I'll Find Away", peaked at #46. Black Ivory had a few other charting singles in the 1970s, including "Time Is Love" #37, "Spinning Around" #45, "What Goes Around (Comes Around)" #44, "Will We Ever Come Together" #40, and later with the dance hit "Mainline" #57 with Russell Patterson as lead singer (written by Burgess, but recorded after he left the group in 1977). Although they recorded some up-tempo songs, Black Ivory are primarily known for sweet soul ballads.

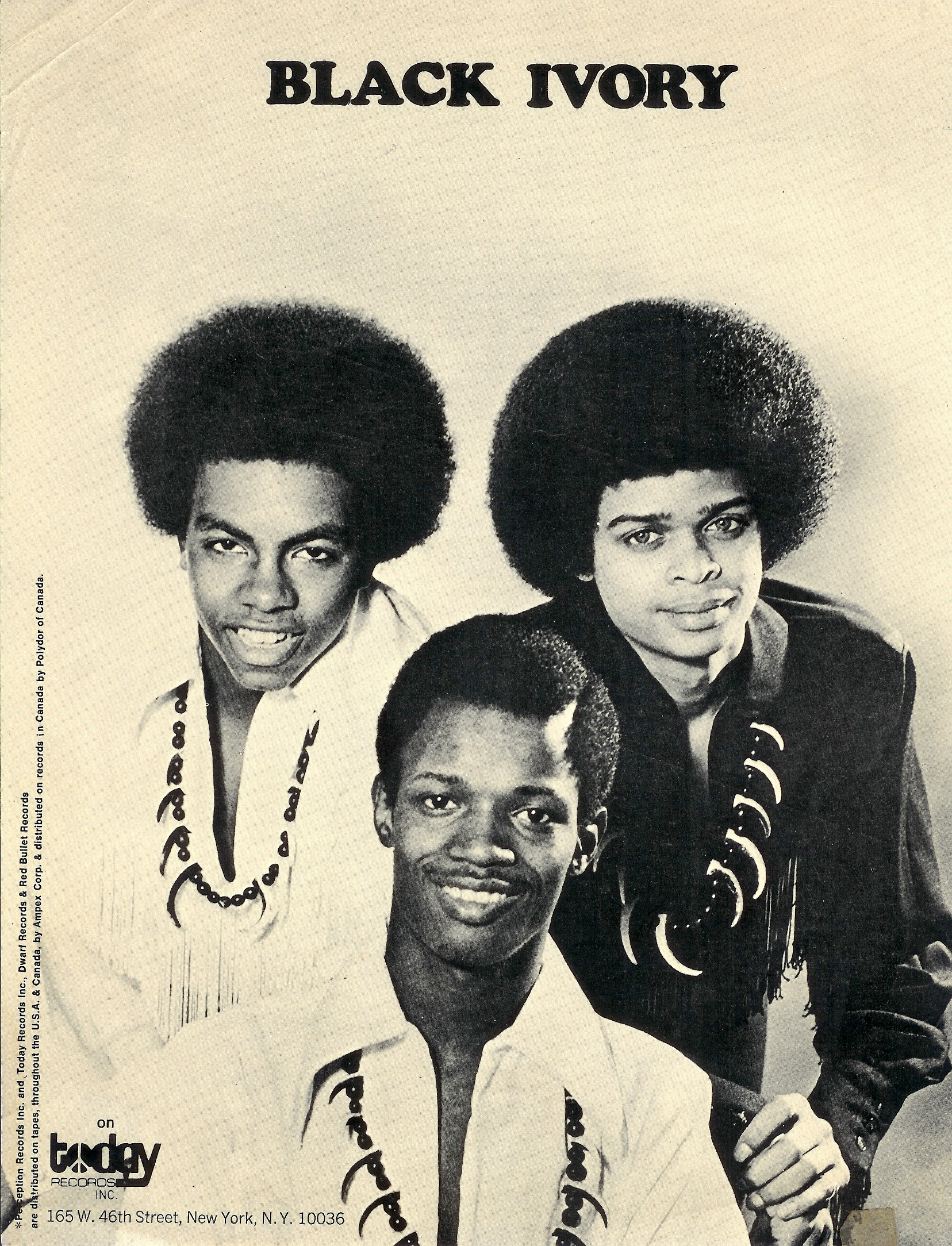
Black Ivory's first promo photo, 1971

Patterson is credited as co-writer on three songs from Black Ivory's debut album, Don't Turn Around: "Surrender", "I Keep Asking You Questions", and "I'll Find a Way". Patterson co-produced their third album, Feel It, along with Robert John, Michael Gately, Leroy Burgess and Stuart Bascombe, and was co-writer on the songs "Daily News", "Warm Inside", and "Your Eyes Say Goodbye". Patterson co-wrote "Dance" from their album Black Ivory. With the exception of "Big Apple Rock", Patterson co-produced all songs on their 5th Album, Hangin' Heavy.

Black Ivory appeared on season three of Soul Train on June 1, 1974, and on PBS television show, SOUL! in 1972.

After the departure of Leroy Burgess in 1977, Patterson and Bascombe continued as a duo and disbanded in early 1980's.

In 1988, Patterson signed a solo deal with Culture Shock Records and released the single, "I Surrender". It was written and produced by Patterson and Cleveland Wright. Patterson then worked with producer John Robinson on the album The Robinson Wall Project, co-writing the release, "More I Get". On a separate project Patterson released another single, "The Time Is Right" with John Robinson.

In 1995 the group reunited. They returned to the stage on the Classic Soul circuit, featuring all three original members, with Stuart Bascombe doing most of the leads. They have been performing and recording together ever since. Patterson is a contributing writer on Wu-Tang Clan rapper, Raekwon's single, Criminology off of his 1995 hit album Only Built 4 Cuban Linx.... On October 2, 1995, the album was certified Gold by the RIAA. In the recent years, they released a Christmas single entitled "Snow", written by Patterson and Burgess and In November 2011, a new CD entitled Continuum on their own label, SLR Records LLC.

=== Recent years ===
Since 2015, Patterson has been working as an actor on various television shows, most notably as an FBI agent on the last season of The Following starring Kevin Bacon. Patterson was pictured with Bacon on the cover of Variety Mar 2, 2015, in a scene from season 3 episode 1, "New Blood". In 2013, Patterson was the featured vocalist on Teleport's "More I Get" on the Robinson Wall Project Vol. 1 CD. In 2016 Patterson released a single on SLR Records. It was a remake of an Issac Hayes penned song by soul group The Emotions, "Show Me How". In 2018 Patterson was featured vocalist on DJ Franke Estevez' house music release, "Celebrate". He co-wrote and co-produced the release with Estevez. In 2019 Patterson released a single on Dawson Road Records, "Sign of the Times".

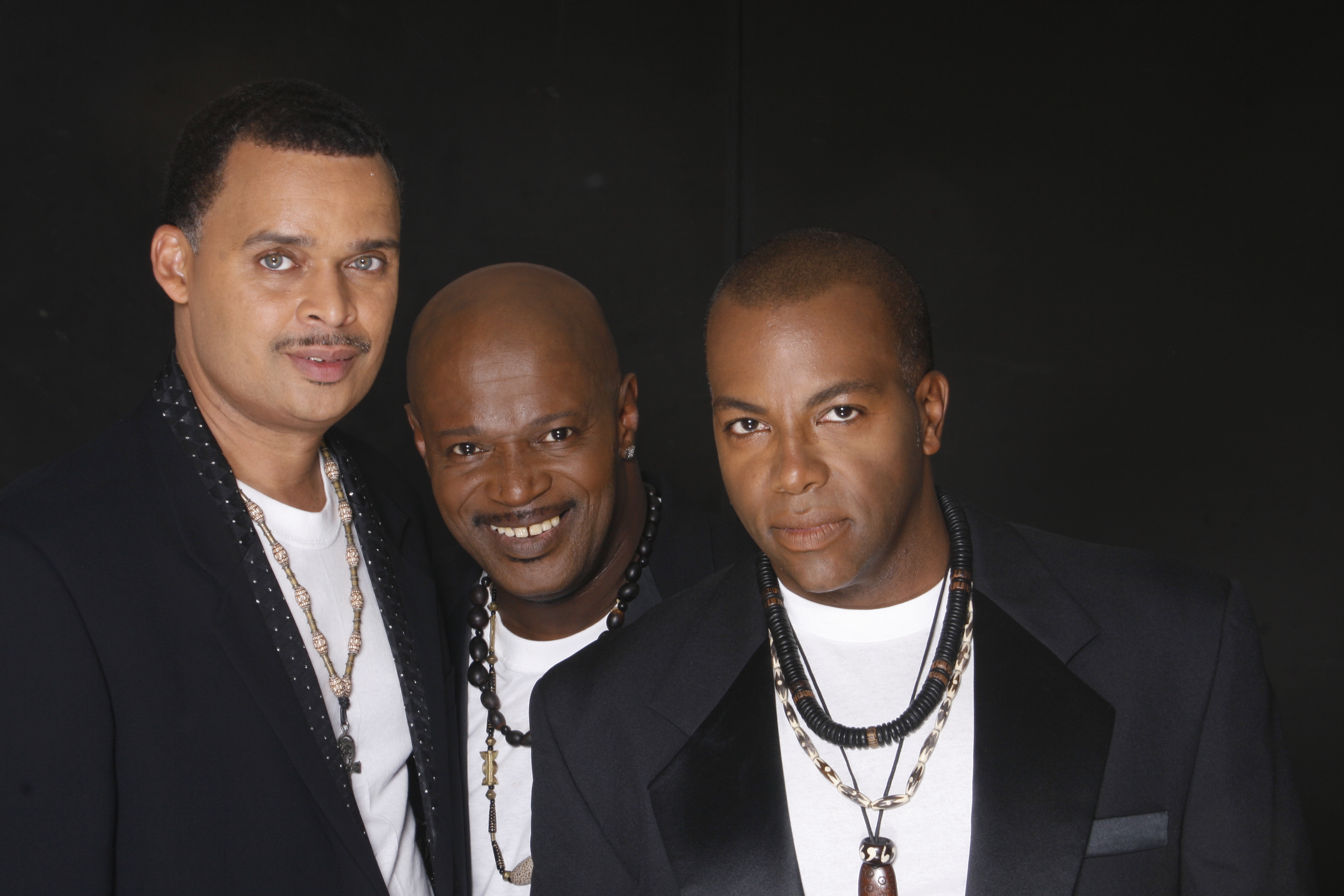
(l to r) Stuart Bascombe, Leroy Burgess, & Russell Patterson in 2007

Patterson, along with Burgess and Bascombe are featured guests in the award-winning 2018 documentary, Mr. Soul!, a film based on the host and executive producer of SOUL!, Ellis Haizlip, the first “black Tonight Show.” In 1968, SOUL! was launched as a local, New York broadcast. In 1969 the series went nationwide on PBS, on WNET Channel 13. Haizlip had produced over 130 hour-long shows featuring an array of A-list guests. Actor Blair Underwood is the Executive Director and narrator of the film.

In October 2019, Patterson along with Black Ivory's band-mate, Stuart Bascombe traveled to the UK and joined Leroy Burgess on stage at London's Jazz Cafe. It was the first time that Black Ivory had performed together in London. They were honored with awards to commemorate their 50th anniversary. In addition, Black Ivory was featured in a 13-page article in the London magazine, The Soul Survivors.

Patterson continues to perform and record with Black Ivory and as a solo artist.

== Discography ==
=== Albums ===
With Black Ivory

- Don't Turn Around (1972) (Today Records) #13 Billboard R&B Chart
- Baby, Won't You Change Your Mind (1972) (Today Records) #26 Billboard R&B Chart
- Feel It (1975) (Buddah Records)
- Black Ivory (1976) (Buddah Records)
- Hangin' Heavy (1979) (Buddah Records/Arista Records)
- Then and Now (1984) (Panoramic Records)
- Continuum (2011) (SLR Records)

=== Singles ===
- "Don't Turn Around" (1971) #38 Billboard R&B Chart
- "You and I" (1972) #32 Billboard R&B Chart
- "I'll Find a Way (The Loneliest Man In Town)" (1972) #46 Billboard R&B Chart
- "Time Is Love"/"Got to Be There" (1972) #37 Billboard R&B Chart
- "Spinning Around" (1973) #45 Billboard R&B Chart
- "What Goes Around (Comes Around)" (1974) #44 Billboard R&B Chart
- "Will We Ever Come Together" (1975) #40 Billboard R&B Chart
- "Daily News"
- "You Mean Everything to Me"
- "Walking Downtown (Saturday Night)" (1976)
- "You Turned My Whole World Around" (1978)
- "Mainline"/"Dance" (1979) #57 Billboard Dance Club Chart
- "You Are My Lover" (1984)
- "I've Got My Eye On You" (1985) #18 Billboard Dance Club Chart

Solo Artist

- "I Surrender" (1988)
- "The Time Is Right" (1989)
- "More I Get" (1993)
- "Show Me How" (2016)
- "Celebrate" (2018)
- "Sign Of The Times" (2020)
- "Valerie" (2021)
