= Baby Won't You Change Your Mind =

Studio album by Black Ivory
- Released: December 1972
- Studios: Blue Rock Studio, New York
- Genres: R&B; soul; funk
- Length: 30:01
- Label: Today/Perception
- Producers: Patrick Adams, David Jordan

Black Ivory chronology
Don't Turn Around (1972)	Baby Won't You Change Your Mind (1972)	Feel It (1975)

Singles from Baby Won't You Change Your Mind
- 1. "Time Is Love" Released: November 1972; 2. "Spinning Around" Released: May 1973

Baby Won't You Change Your Mind is the second album by American soul/R&B vocal group, Black Ivory. The album was produced by Patrick Adams and David Jordan, and released in December 1972 on Today Records/Perception Records.

== Album information ==
After the success of Black Ivory's top 20 debut album, Don't Turn Around, earlier in that year, they went back into the studio seven months later to record Baby Won't You Change Your Mind. It was released at the end of 1972. The first single from the album, "Time Is Love", written by Patrick Adams and David Jordan was a top 40 hit peaking at NO. 37 on the Billboard R&B singles chart in February 1973. The B-side, "Got to Be There", featured on their debut album, is a remake of Michael Jackson's 1971 song and written by Elliot Willensky. The second and final single from the album, "Spinning Around", was written by Adams, Jordan and June Anderson. It was released in 1973 and peaked at No. 45 on the Billboard R&B chart.

Album Cover by photographer Reginald Wickham and the liner by Lenny Adams, Terry Adams and Bob Demchuck.

== Critical reception ==
Andrew Hamilton, reviewing the album for AllMusic, described it as "A more even affair than their first LP", and praised Adams' songs and productions alongside Leroy Burgess's vocals and Stuart Bascombe's and Russell Patterson's "arresting harmonies".

== Chart performance ==
Baby Won't You Change Your Mind stayed on the Billboard Top R&B Albums chart for 13 weeks and peaked at No. 26 on March 3, 1973. The album peaked at No. 188 on the Billboard Top 200 Albums chart during a 7-week run.

== Track listing ==
All tracks are written by Patrick Adams and David Jordan, except where noted.

Side one
No.	Title	Writer(s)	Length
1.	"Baby Won't You Change Your Mind"		4:00
2.	"Just Leave Me Some"		2:32
3.	"Push Come to Shove"		2:25
4.	"Time Is Love"		3:44
5.	"Spinning Around"	Jordan; June Anderson; Adams	2:45
6.	"If I Could Be a Mirror"		3:54

Side two
No.	Title	Length
1.	"It's Time to Say Goodbye"	3:00
2.	"One Way Ticket to Loveland"	2:15
3.	"No If's And's, or But's"	3:40
4.	"Wishful Thinking"	4:40

== Personnel ==
Black Ivory

- Leroy Burgess - vocals
- Stuart Bascombe - vocals
- Russell Patterson – vocals

Production

- Produced, by Patrick Adams and David Jordan
- Arranged by Patrick Peter Adams
- Album design by Fred Stark
- Engineer – Eddie Korvin
- Engineer (mixing) – David Jordan, Eddie Korvin, Patrick Adams
- Pressure provided by Boo Frazier, Terry Philips

== Charts ==
Chart (1973)	Peak positions
U.S. Billboard Top LPs	188
U.S. Billboard Top Soul LPs	26

Singles

Year	Single	Peak chart positions
Year	Single	US R&B
1973	"Time Is Love"	37
1973	"Spinning Around"	45
