= Don't Turn Around (disambiguation) =

"Don't Turn Around" is a 1986 song by Tina Turner.

Don't Turn Around may also refer to:

- Don't Turn Around (album), a 1972 studio album by Black Ivory
  - "Don't Turn Around" (Black Ivory song), 1971
- "Don't Turn Around" (Amy Shark song), 2018
- "Don't Turn Around", a 2020 song by Biig Piig
