= Inner Life =

American club-oriented soul studio project

- Origin: New York, NY, United States
- Genres: Disco, boogie, soul
- Years active: 1979–1986
- Label: Salsoul

Inner Life was an American club-oriented soul studio project formed in 1979 that enjoyed success with "I'm Caught Up (In a One Night Love Affair)" (1979), "Ain't No Mountain High Enough" (1981), and "Moment of My Life" (1982). Tracks featured the vocals of Jocelyn Brown and Leroy Burgess (formerly of Black Ivory). They were produced and arranged by Patrick Adams and engineered by Bob Blank and Joe Arlotta, the album was originally produced for executive producer Greg Carmichael, whose Red Greg Records was an early and prolific disco label based in New York. "Ain't No Mountain High Enough" is probably most well known in its classic remix by DJ Larry Levan.

== Discography ==
Inner Life discography
- Studio albums: 3
- Compilation albums: 1
- Singles: 9

=== Studio albums ===
Year	Album	Label	US R&B
1979	I'm Caught Up	Prelude	47
1980	Inner Life	Salsoul	—
1981	Inner Life II	Salsoul	—

=== Compilation albums ===
- The Anthology (Salsoul, 2005)

=== Singles ===
Year	Single	Peak chart positions	
Year	Single	US Dance	US R&B
1979	"I'm Caught Up (In a One Night Love Affair)"	7	22
1980	"I Want to Give You Me"	—	—
1981	"Ain't No Mountain High Enough"	20	—
1981	"(Knock Out) Let's Go Another Round / Live It Up"	―	―
1982	"Moment of My Life"	15	—
1982	"I Like It Like That"	40	—
1983	"No Way"	—	93
1984	"Let's Change It Up"	―	―
1986	"Your Love"	―	―
"—" denotes releases that did not chart or were not released in that territory.
