= Don't Turn Around (Black Ivory song) =

1971 single by Black Ivory

Single by Black Ivory

from the album Don't Turn Around
- B-side: "I Keep Asking You Questions"
- Released: 1971
- Studio: Sigma Sound, Philadelphia, Pennsylvania
- Genre: R&B; soul
- Length: 2:53
- Label: Today; Perception
- Songwriter(s): Patrick Adams
- Producer(s): Adams

Black Ivory singles chronology
| "Don't Turn Around" (1971) | "You and I" (1972) |

"Don't Turn Around" is the debut single by the American soul/R&B vocal group Black Ivory. The song was written, produced, and arranged by record producer Patrick Adams

== Song information ==
Black Ivory's debut single, "Don't Turn Around", was released in April 1971 and serves as the title track of their debut album. The song entered the Billboard Soul singles chart in November 1971, reaching its peak at No. 38 in January 1972. The single, along with the B-side, "I Keep Asking You Questions", written by Black Ivory and Adams, was recorded at Sigma Sound Studio in Philadelphia, Pennsylvania.

== Critical reception ==
The song received positive reviews, with Andrew Hamilton of AllMusic describing it as Black Ivory's first single, this hurtin' Patrick Adams ballad released by Today Records in the spring of 1971. Leroy Burgess' sweet, innocent falsetto worms right into your heart as he tries to convince himself that an affair is over".

== Covers and samples ==
In 1989, the Washington, D.C.–based go-go band E.U. covered, "Don't Turn Around" on their album, Livin' Large.

Rapper Raekwon sampled "I Keep Asking You Questions" for his song "Criminology", on his 1995 album, Only Built 4 Cuban Linx.

In 2010, Raekwon, Ghostface Killah and Method Man sampled, "I Keep Asking You Questions" on their single, "Criminology 2.5." from the album, Wu-Massacre.

On her album Black Ivory, Poet Wanda Robinson used the instrumental track "Don't Turn Around" as the background for her poem "The Final Hour" and "I Keep Asking You Questions" for her poem "Instant Replay." Robinson was Black Ivory's labelmate at Today/Perception.

JID sampled "Don't Turn Around" on "For Keeps" from his 2025 album, God Does Like Ugly.

== Personnel ==
Black Ivory

- Leroy Burgess
- Stuart Bascombe
- Russell Patterson

== Production ==
Produced, conducted and arranged by Patrick Adams

- Vocal arrangements by Leroy Burgess
- String arrangements on "If I Could Be A Mirror", by Leroy Burgess

"Don't Turn Around" / "I Keep Asking You Questions" (singles)

- Patrick Adams, Robert Ayers: Piano
- Val Burke: Bass
- Norman Harris and Patrick Adams: Guitar
- Arnold Ramsey: Drums
- Vince Montana: Vibes
- Larry Washington: Conga
