= Off-Shore =

German dance music production group

- Origin: Germany
- Genres: Eurodance
- Years active: 1990–91
- Label: CBS
- Past members: Jens Lissat; Peter Harder

Off-Shore was a German production duo who had a top ten hit in the UK singles charts in 1991.

== History ==
The duo was made up of Jens Lissat, who was also a member of the band Interactive, and Peter Harder, the owner of the Try Harder Studio in Hamburg.

In December 1990, the duo released their first single under the Off-shore name, "I Can't Take The Power", via CBS Records; it took heavy samples from Jocelyn Brown's "Love's Gonna Get You", which was also sampled by Snap! on "The Power", and "Weekend" by Class Action. The single entered the UK singles charts just before Christmas, and, after the Christmas record market had faded away, it rose into the top ten, peaking at number 7 in late January, and earning the duo an appearance on Top of the Pops.

The cut did not make the German charts, but peaked at number 77 in the Dutch singles chart in April 1991.

The single also peaked at number 11 on the Irish singles chart, with the duo competing with itself in the Irish music market, as they had released a single for the Christmas market, "Alleluia", released under the name Prayers. The single consisted of a sample of a Gregorian chant over a Christmas Mass, but it did not chart, and was not released in the UK.

The duo only released one other single under the name, "I Got A Little Song" (with Elaine Jackson on vocals and N. O. "Kenny" Nwoke on rap), on CBS sub-label Dance Pool Records, which spent a week at number 64 in the UK charts the following year.
