= Don't Turn Around (album) =

Studio album by Black Ivory
- Released: March 1972
- Studios: Sound Ideas, New York City; Sigma Sound, Philadelphia; Blue Rock, New York City
- Genres: R&B; Philadelphia soul; funk
- Length: 34:01
- Label: Today Records/Perception Records
- Producer: Patrick Adams

Black Ivory chronology
| Don't Turn Around (1972) | Baby Won't You Change Your Mind (1972) |

Singles from Don't Turn Around
- 1. "Don't Turn Around" Released: April 1971; 2. "You and I" Released: February 1972; 3. "I'll Find A way (Loneliest Man In Town)" Released: July 1972

Don't Turn Around is the debut album by American soul/R&B vocal group, Black Ivory. The album was produced and arranged by record producer, Patrick Adams. and released in March 1972 on Today Records/Perception Records

== Album information ==
Black Ivory's debut single, "Don't Turn Around" (written by Patrick Adams) was released in April 1971 and peaked at No. 38 on the Billboard R&B/Soul singles chart in January 1972. The single along with the B-side, "I Keep Asking You Questions" was recorded at Sigma Sound Studio in Philadelphia, Pennsylvania. Two more singles were released, "You and I" (Written by Leroy Burgess and Stuart Bascombe), and "I'll Find a Way" (written by Black Ivory and Patrick Adams). "You and I" peaked at No. 32 on the Billboard Soul/R&B singles chart, while "I'll Find a Way" peaked at No. 46 on the same chart. The album spent 19 weeks on the Billboard R&B albums chart, peaking at No. 13 in May 1972. The album crossed-over to Billboard‘s 200 chart peaking at No. 158.

Other songs on the album include the B-side to "Don't Turn Around", the upbeat tempo song, "I Keep Asking You Questions", written by Black Ivory and Patrick Adams; and a cover to Michael Jackson's hit single, "Got to Be There", written by Elliot Willensky.

== Track listing ==
Side one
| No. | Title | Writer(s) | Length |
|---|---|---|---|
| 1. | "Don't Turn Around" | Patrick Adams | 3:30 |
| 2. | "Surrender" | Black Ivory; Adams | 2:30 |
| 3. | "I'll Find A Way" | Black Ivory; Adams | 3:22 |
| 4. | "I Keep Asking You Questions" | Black Ivory; Adams | 3:06 |
| 5. | "She Said That She's Leaving" | Adams | 2:45 |
| 6. | "If I Could Be A Mirror" | Leroy Burgess | 2:35 |

Side two
| No. | Title | Writer(s) | Length |
|---|---|---|---|
| 1. | "You and I" | Stuart Bascombe; Leroy Burgess; Burgess | 7:21 |
| 2. | "Our Future" | Adams; Terry Philips | 3:05 |
| 3. | "Find The One Who Loves You" | Black Ivory; Adams | 2:55 |
| 4. | "Got to Be There" | Elliot Willensky | 4:12 |

== Personnel ==
Black Ivory

- Leroy Burgess - vocals
- Stuart Bascombe - vocals
- Russell Patterson – vocals

== Production ==
All songs were produced, conducted and arranged by Patrick Adams

- Vocal arrangements by Leroy Burgess
- String arrangements on "If I Could Be A Mirror, by Leroy Burgess

Don’t Turn Around/I Keep Asking You Questions (Singles)

- Patrick Adams, Robert Ayers: Piano
- Val Burke: Bass
- Norman Harris & Patrick Adams: Guitar
- Arnold Ramsey: Drums
- Vince Montana: Vibes
- Larry Washington: Conga

The album (all other songs)

- Patrick Adams: Bass, Guitar, Piano, Organ, Drums, Celeste, Moog Synthesizer, Timpani
- Larry Blackmon: Drums on You & I, Find The One Who Loves You
- Gordon Edwards: Bass
- Harry Lookofsky: Concertmaster (all songs)

== Charts ==
| Chart (1972) | Peak position |
|---|---|
| U.S. Billboard Top LPs. | 158 |
| U.S. Billboard Top Soul LPs | 13 |

Singles

| Year | Single | Peak chart positions |
| Year | Single | US R&B |
|---|---|---|
| 1971 | "Don't Turn Around" | 38 |
| 1972 | "You and I" | 32 |
| 1972 | "I'll Find a Way" | 46 |
