= Got to Be There (song) =

1971 single by Michael Jackson

- Solid centre variant of the UK single

Single by Michael Jackson

from the album Got to Be There
- B-side: "Maria (You Were the Only One)"
- Released: October 7, 1971
- Recorded: June–July 1971
- Studio: Motown Recording Studios (Los Angeles, California)
- Genre: Pop; R&B
- Length: 3:22
- Label: Motown
- Songwriter: Elliot Willensky
- Producer: Hal Davis

Michael Jackson singles chronology
"Got to Be There" (1971)	"Rockin' Robin" (1972)

Audio
- "Got To Be There" on YouTube

"Got to Be There" is the debut solo single by the American singer Michael Jackson, written by Elliot Willensky and released as a single on October 7, 1971, on Motown Records. The song was produced by Hal Davis and recorded at Motown's Hitsville West studios in Hollywood.

The single became an immediate success, reaching number one on Cashbox's pop and R&B singles charts, while reaching number four on Billboard's pop and R&B singles charts. Released to select European countries, it also found success, reaching number five in the UK. The song was composed as a pop ballad with soul and soft rock elements. The song was musically arranged by Dave Blumberg while Willie Hutch produced its vocal arrangements.

Motown label mates the Miracles released their version on their 1972 album Flying High Together, while Diana Ross recorded a version of the song for her unreleased 1973 album To the Baby which was eventually issued as part of the 2010 Expanded edition of her Touch Me in the Morning album. R&B group Black Ivory recorded a version on their 1972 debut album entitled, "Don't Turn Around", which peaked at No. 13 on the Billboard's R&B chart.

A cover version of the song by Chaka Khan from her eponymous fourth solo album reached #5 on the R&B Charts in 1983.

== Live performances ==
1. Hellzapoppin': Jackson performed "Got to Be There" for the first time at Hellzapoppin' at March 1, 1972 with his brothers, along with Sugar Daddy and Brand New Thing. The performance is about 2 minutes and it included an intro showing a garage door opening revealing the Jackson 5.
2. Live at the Forum: The performance is similar to the one from Hellzapoppin'. It was recorded on August 26, 1972, and released on June 21, 2010.
3. The Jackson 5 in Japan: Audio recording from the concert in Japan at April 30, 1973 was released on the album Jackson 5 in Japan. Here, the performance is almost 4 minutes and it had a spoken line for intro.

== Personnel ==
- Written and composed by Elliot Willensky
- Produced by Hal Davis
- Lead vocals by Michael Jackson
- Background vocals by Jackie Jackson, Tito Jackson, Jermaine Jackson, and Marlon Jackson
- Arrangement by Dave Blumberg
- Vocal arrangement by Willie Hutch

== Charts ==
=== Weekly charts ===
Weekly chart performance for "Got to Be There"
Chart (1971–72)	Peak position
Australian ARIA Singles Chart	83
Canadian RPM Top Singles	3
UK Official Singles Chart (OCC)	5
US Billboard Hot 100	4
US Billboard Best Selling Soul Singles	4
US Billboard Easy Listening	14
US Cash Box Top 100	1

=== Year-end charts ===
Year-end chart performance for "Got to Be There"
Chart (1971)	Position
Canada	38

== Sales ==
Sales for "Got to Be There"
Region	Certification	Certified units/sales
United States	—	1,600,000

== Cover versions ==
- Fellow Motown recording act the Miracles recorded the track for their final studio album, Flying High Together, in 1972.
- In 1972, R&B Group, Black Ivory recorded a version on their top R&B 20 debut album, "Don't Turn Around". It was the B-side to their top 40 single, "Time Is Love".
- In 1982, Chaka Khan had a top 5 R&B hit version with the song, featured on her self-titled album.
- In 1993, George Benson performed the track using his guitar and vocal hums on his 1993 album, Love Remembers.
- In 2007, group Boyz II Men covered it for their 2007 release, Motown: A Journey Through Hitsville USA.

== See also ==
- List of Cash Box Top 100 number-one singles of 1972
