= Interactive (band) =

- Origin: Germany
- Genres: Electronic
- Years active: 1990–present
- Members: Andreas Geraldo Schneider; Jens Lissat; Ramon Zenker; Tobias Lützenkirchen
- Past members: Marc Innocent

Interactive is a German electronic music group.

== History ==
The group was founded in 1990; one member, Jens Lissat, was also a member of Off-Shore, which had a top ten single in the UK singles chart in 1991.

The group is best known for its 1992 single "Who Is Elvis" which reached No. 12 in Germany, and for its 1994 cover version of Alphaville's "Forever Young", which reached No. 7 in Germany, while also making the top 20 in several other countries. Interactive released two studio albums, Intercollection in 1991 and Touché in 1995. Its last released work was the 1998 single "Fanatic". In 2002, Kosmonova remixed their version of "Forever Young".

== Discography ==
=== Albums ===
Year	Album details
1992	Intercollection: Label: Dance Street Records
1995	Touché: Label: Blow Up Records

=== Singles ===
Year	Single	Peak Chart Positions								Certification
Year	Single	GER	AUS	AUT	BEL (Fla)	NLD	SWE	SWI	UK	Certification
1990	"No Control"	—	—	—	—	—	—	—	—	
1990	"The Techno Wave"	—	—	—	—	—	—	—	—	
1991	"Who Is Elvis"	12	—	—	—	—	—	22	87	
1991	"Work That Body"	—	—	—	—	—	—	—	—	
1992	"Dildo" / "The Devil"	31	—	—	—	18	—	—	—	
1992	"Elevator Up and Down"	—	—	—	—	—	—	—	—	
1993	"Amok"	—	—	—	—	—	—	—	—	
1994	"Can You Hear Me Calling"	—	—	—	—	—	—	—	—	
1994	"Forever Young"	7	15	12	38	15	18	15	28	ARIA: Gold
1995	"Living Without Your Love"	17	92	—	—	47	—	39	—	
1995	"Tell Me When"	38	—	—	—	—	—	—	—	
1996	"Sun Always Shines on TV"	—	—	—	—	—	—	—	—	
1996	"We Are One"	—	—	—	—	—	—	—	—	
1997	"Koma"	—	—	—	—	—	—	—	—	
1997	"Wake Up!"	82	—	—	—	—	—	—	—	
1997	"No Return"	89	—	—	—	—	—	—	—	
1998	"Fanatic"	—	—	—	—	—	—	—	—	
2002	"Forever Young" (Kosmonova remix)	21	—	—	—	—	—	—	37	
"—" denotes a single that did not chart
