= Flying High Together =

Studio album by Smokey Robinson & The Miracles
- Released: July 27, 1972
- Recorded: 1972
- Genre: Soul
- Label: Tamla; T 318L
- Producer: Johnny Bristol, Smokey Robinson, Stevie Wonder, Ashford & Simpson

Smokey Robinson & The Miracles chronology
One Dozen Roses (1971)	Flying High Together (1972)	Smokey Robinson & The Miracles: 1957–1972 (1972)

Singles from Flying High Together
- 1. "We've Come Too Far to End It Now" Released: May 4, 1972; 2. "I Can’t Stand To See You Cry" Released: November 15, 1972

Professional ratings
Review scores
Source	Rating
AllMusic	3/5 stars
Christgau's Record Guide	C+

Flying High Together is an album by Smokey Robinson and the Miracles on Motown Records' Tamla label, released in 1972. It is noted as The Miracles' last studio album with original lead singer Smokey Robinson, who retired from the act to concentrate on his duties as vice president of Motown. The album charted at #46 on the Billboard Pop Album chart, and featured two singles: the appropriately named "We've Come Too Far to End It Now", which matched the parent album's chart position on the Billboard singles chart, charting at #46, and reached the Top 10 of the Billboard R&B singles chart, charting at #9, and "I Can't Stand to See You Cry", which charted at #45 Pop, and #21 R&B.

The album also featured a cover of The Stylistics' 1971 hit "Betcha By Golly Wow", the "Theme from Love Story" and covers of the Michael Jackson solo hit, "Got to Be There" (featuring guitar work by Miracle Marv Tarplin), and The Chi-Lites'#1 hit, "Oh Girl". The album also features songs composed by Ashford & Simpson, Stevie Wonder and Syretta Wright, Bobby Miller, who was responsible for The Dells' long string of hits, and Motown producer Johnny Bristol, but neither Smokey nor any of the other Miracles contributed to the writing on this album and Smokey himself produced only two tracks, the aforementioned "Got to Be There" and "Love Story".

The release of this album coincided with the group's final nationwide tour, before replacing Smokey with Billy Griffin. As of 2018, Flying High Together has yet to be issued on CD, but several of its songs have shown up on various Miracles foreign and domestic CD compilations. The Miracles' next studio album was 1973's Billy Griffin-led Renaissance.

== Track listing ==
=== Side one ===
1. "I Can't Stand to See You Cry" (Johnny Bristol, Wade Brown, Jr., David Jones, Jr.)
2. "Theme from Love Story" (Francis Lai, Carl Sigman)
3. "We've Come Too Far to End It Now" (Bristol, Brown, Jones)
4. "Flying High Together" (Bristol, Brown, Jones)
5. "With Your Love Came" (Bristol, Brown, Jones)
6. "It Will Be Alright" (Stevie Wonder, Syreeta Wright)

=== Side two ===
1. "Oh Girl" (Eugene Record)
2. "You Ain't Livin' till You're Lovin'" (Nickolas Ashford, Valerie Simpson)
3. "We Had a Love So Strong" (Wonder, Wright)
4. "Got to Be There" (Elliot Willensky)
5. "Betcha by Golly, Wow" (Linda Creed, Thom Bell)

== Personnel ==
=== The Miracles ===
- Bill "Smokey" Robinson – lead vocals
- Claudette Rodgers Robinson – backing vocals (soprano)
- Robert "Bobby" Rodgers – backing vocals (tenor)
- Ronald "Ronnie" White – backing vocals (baritone)
- Warren "Pete" Moore – backing vocals (bass)
- Marvin "Marv" Tarplin – guitar

=== Additional ===
- The Funk Brothers – other instrumentation
- H.B. Barnum – arranger
- David Van De Pitte – arranger
- Eddie Nucilli – arranger
