= The Universal Robot Band =

American band formed in 1976

- Genres: Disco, post-disco, R&B
- Label: Red Greg
- Past members: Gregory Carmichael; Patrick Adams; Leroy Burgess; Gregory Tolbert; Woody Cunningham

The Universal Robot Band was an American music group comprising Gregory Carmichael, Patrick Adams, Leroy Burgess, Gregory Tolbert and Woody Cunningham.

The band was formed by Patrick Adams and Greg Carmichael in 1976. Their debut single, "Dance and Shake Your Tambourine" which featured Gregory Tolbert on keyboards, peaked at No. 25 on the Dance/Club Play Singles chart, #48 on the R&B Singles chart and No. 93 on the Hot 100.

The band consisted of the members of Kleeer - Woody Cunningham (vocals/drums), Richard Lee (vocals/guitar), Paul Crutchfield (vocals/percussion) and Norman Durham (vocals/bass/keyboards) - when they accepted an offer to effectively become the studio group in 1976 while they transformed themselves from rock band Pipeline. They toured and recorded as the Universal Robot Band for two years before deciding to set out on their own again, as Kleeer.

== Discography ==
=== Studio albums ===
- Dance and Shake Your Tambourine (1977)
- Freak in the Light of the Moon (1978)

=== Singles ===
Year	Title	Peak chart positions		
Year	Title	US Pop	US R&B	US Dance
1976	"Dance and Shake Your Tambourine"	93	48	25
1977	"Disco Christmas"	―	―	―
1978	"Freak with Me"	―	―	―
1980	"Let's Get This Thing Together" (with Debbie Hayes)	―	―	―
1982	"Barely Breaking Even"	―	―	―
"—" denotes releases that did not chart or were not released in that territory.
