= Move (Q-Tip song) =

Single by Q-Tip

from the album The Renaissance
- Released: October 15, 2008
- Recorded: 2008
- Genre: Hip hop; funk; soul
- Length: 5:49 (album version, including "Renaissance Rap"); 2:50 (single version)
- Label: Universal Motown
- Songwriters: Kamaal Fareed; Hal Davis; Don Fletcher; Dean Parks
- Producer: J Dilla

Q-Tip singles chronology
"Gettin' Up" (2008)	"Move" (2008)	"Bang Bang Bang" (2010)

"Move" is the second single released by American rapper/producer Q-Tip from his album The Renaissance. Produced by J Dilla, it samples "Dancing Machine" by The Jackson 5.

== Music video ==
The video for this single premiered on BET's 106 & Park on November 4, 2008. Q-Tip appeared on the show and discussed the release date of his album. The video borrows from Michael Jackson's "Rock with You" video. It was directed by Rik Cordero.
