= Blue Rock Studio =

Defunct American recording studio

- Address: 29 Greene Street, New York City 10013
- Location: New York City
- Type: Recording studio

Construction
- Opened: 1970

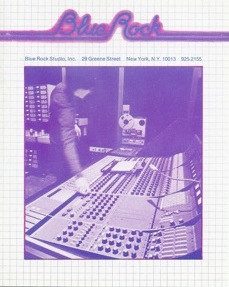

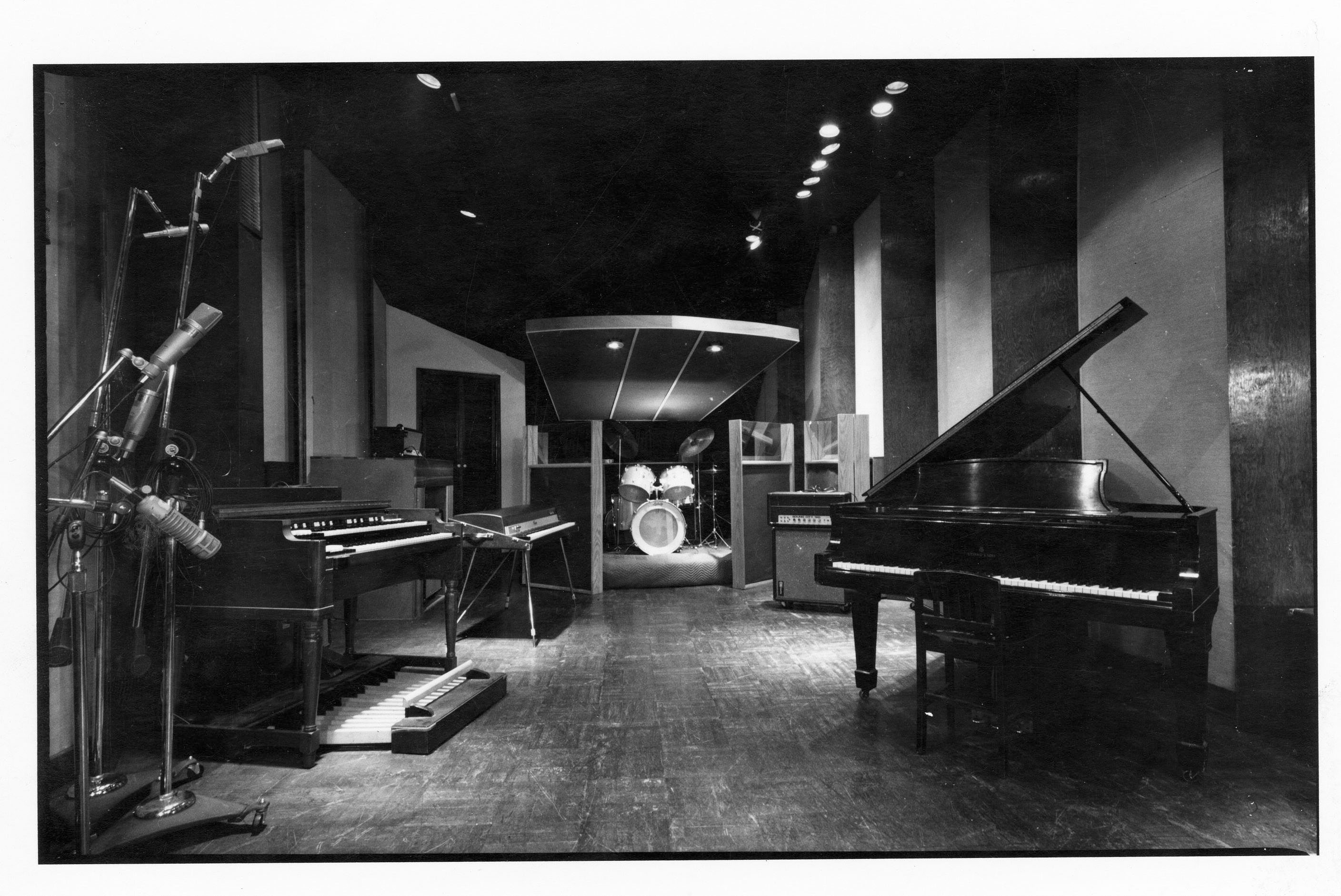

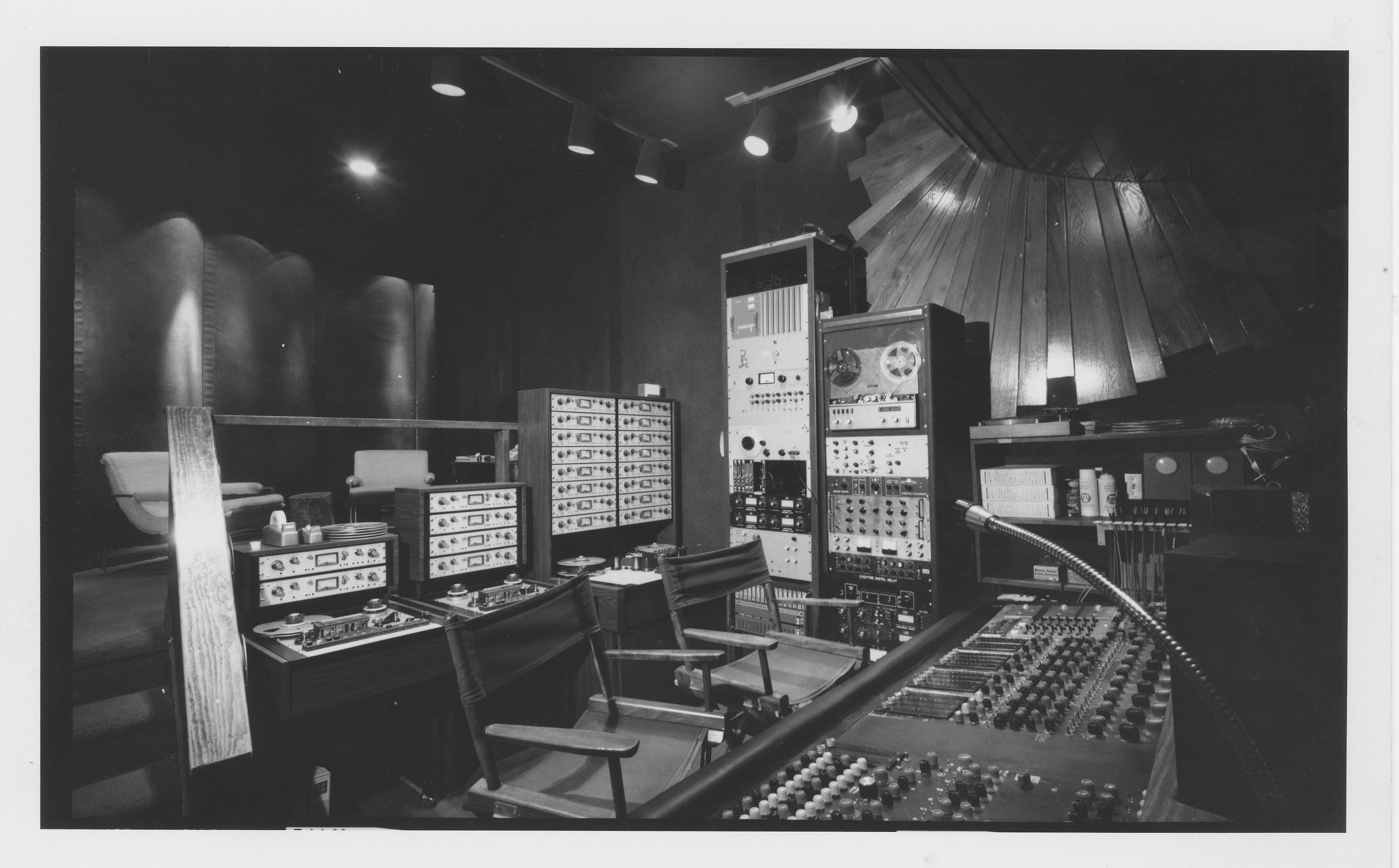

Blue Rock Studio was an independent 16- and 24-track recording facility located in Manhattan's SoHo district. Founded by owner Eddie Korvin, it opened in 1970 and was sold in 1986.

== Early years ==
After meeting John Storyk, a recent architecture graduate, at the Electric Circus and Cerebrum, a club Storyk designed, Korvin hired Storyk to design the new studio located in a three-level, standalone cast iron building on Greene Street. Storyk, whose first two studio jobs were Electric Lady Studios and Blue Rock, designed the recording room, control room and reception space on the street-level floor. Tom Dwyer and Ken Robertson, electronic designers and builders at one of New York's major labels, worked nights and weekends building a custom solid state console, installing all additional equipment including Scully 16-, 4-, and 2-track tape machines. Seeking additional help, Korvin invited long-time friend Joe Schick to return to New York and become a partner in the studio. Upon opening to clients, Schick served primarily as studio manager for about four years before departing Blue Rock. Korvin handled the majority of engineering duties and became chief engineer. Blue Rock was also one of the first New York studios to employ a female engineer, Jan Rathbun.

Musically diverse, the first two 1971 sessions at Blue Rock for start-up Perception Records were an American remix of the 45 rpm hit single "Dancing in the Moonlight" by King Harvest and a mixdown of a live club recording by jazz saxophonist James Moody. One of the attractions of Blue Rock was privacy and discretion. "I like it. I’ll be back", said Bob Dylan after checking out the studio one afternoon. A three-day booking was arranged for March 1971 where Dylan, backed by Leon Russell and band, jammed and recorded "Watching the River Flow" and "When I Paint My Masterpiece". Both songs were subsequently released on CBS Records and Dylan returned to Blue Rock on two other occasions later in 1971.

== Later years ==
Around 1975, Korvin decided a partial remodel and equipment upgrade were necessary. Estelle Lazarus was hired as studio manager and public relations person. Around the same time, Michael Ewasko joined the studio as assistant engineer to Eddie Korvin. Later, Ewasko was promoted to chief engineer, a position he kept until the closing of the studio in 1986. Architect Storyk designed the control room remodel and the studio upgraded to Studer 24- and 2-track tape machines and a Neve 8058 console. Original audio designers Dwyer and Robertson oversaw the installation of the new equipment. Notable clients in the later years were The Kinks (2 albums and 1 soundtrack), The Spinners' single "Working My Way Back to You", Keith Richards and Screamin' Jay Hawkins 1979 version "I Put a Spell on You" and the Joe Jackson platinum-selling album, Night and Day, including the song "Steppin' Out", Grammy-nominated for 1983 Record of the Year and Best Male Pop Vocal Performance.

It is of interest to highlight the concentration of jazz composers and players who recorded at Blue Rock throughout its working years. Korvin had a business relationship with Mike Mantler and Carla Bley (Jazz Composers Orchestra) that produced many recording sessions and resulting albums. Later, the studio had a close working relationship with Manhattan-based Muse Records. This jazz-oriented company, headed by Joe Fields, was specifically interested in recording the diverse, vibrant and often experimental music that pervaded New York City. In fact, Eddie Korvin once recorded a visiting group of Swiss-German yodelers accompanied by 13-foot-long alphorns. In this pre-digital era, Blue Rock welcomed an eclectic group of clients and performers in the fields of rock, pop, jazz, folk, classical, dance, TV and radio commercials, film and TV scores, and sounds without category. Music, from the traditional to the interstellar, was played and recorded at Blue Rock Studio.

== Partial list of artists recorded ==
- Bob Dylan, Greatest Hits II
- The Fugs
- New York Dolls
- Bob Marley
- Leon Russell
- Bette Midler
- Judy Collins
- Barbra Streisand
- Keith Richards
- Screamin' Jay Hawkins
- Allan Schwartzberg
- Elliott Randall
- Jerry Friedman
- David Horowitz
- Neil Jason
- Will Lee
- Alan Gordon
- The Chambers Brothers
- Ramones
- Fatback Band
- The Kinks
- Black Ivory
- Patrick Adams
- Tom Verlaine
- The dB's
- John Simon
- Jack Richardson
- Bob Kaminsky
- Michael Cuscuna
- David Kershenbaum
- Ron Frangipane
- Loudon Wainwright III
- The Roches
- Richard Thompson
- U2
- Talking Heads
- Robert Fripp
- Brian Eno
- David Byrne
- Mike Oldfield
- The Spinners
- Rupert Holmes
- Gene Simmons
- John Fahey
- The Waitresses
- Gary McMahan
- Chuck Jackson
- Barrabás
- Jeff Kent & Doug Lubahn
- David Nichtern
- Nile Rodgers
- Eumir Deodato
- Fats Domino
- Tom Sullivan
- The Facedancers
- John Herald
- Bonnie Tyler
- Nina Hagen
- Tom Waits
- Todd Rundgren
- Rickie Lee Jones
- Saturday Night Live Band 1980 featuring Paul Shaffer, David Sanborn and Marcus Miller
- Joe Jackson, Night and Day
- Brecker Brothers
- Teo Macero
- Astrud Gilberto
- Houston Person
- Stuff
- Sonny Stitt
- James Moody
- Pat Martino
- Roswell Rudd
- Gil Evans
- Shirley Horn
- Steve Lacy
- Dave Holland
- Paul Motian
- Billy Hart
- Willie Colón
- Howard Johnson
- Johnny Hartman
- George Benson
- David Sanborn
- Woody Shaw
- John Abercrombie
- Charlie Haden
- Gato Barbieri
- Lester Bowie
- Howard McGhee
- Joe Bonner
- David Murray
- Larry Young
- Dee Dee Bridgewater
- Marvin Hannibal Peterson
- Chico Freeman
- Doc Cheatham
- Kenny Davern
- Tony Parenti
- Freddie Moore
- Bernard Purdie
- Richard Tee
- Steve Gadd
- Ron Carter
- Carla Bley & Mike Mantler
- Bob Babbitt
- Duck Dunn
- Don Cherry
- Eddie Jefferson
- Robin Kenyatta
- Art Farmer
- Cedar Walton
- Richie Cole
- Buster Williams
- Paul Griffin
- Red Rodney
- Cecil Payne
- Enrico Rava
- Grachan Moncur III
- Ornette Coleman
- Jeanne Lee
- Spyro Gyra
- Harold Vick
- Richard Davis
- Clifford Thornton
- Rickie Boger
- Tyrone Washington
- Rashied Ali
- Bobby Naughton
- Muhal Richard Abrams
- Claudio Roditi
- Kenny Barron
- Ahmed Abdullah
- Beaver Harris
- Jaco Pastorius
- Pat Metheny
- Paul Bley
- Bob Moses
- Sun Ra
- Philip Glass
- Frederic Rzewski
- John Cage
- Steve Reich
- Hal Willner
- Elizabeth Swados
- Joe Papp
- Diane Keaton
- William Shatner
- Susan Birkenhead
- Giorgio Gomelski
- Twyla Tharp
- Laurie Anderson
- EDK Productions
- Robert Traynor & Sirocco
- Steve Hiett
- Barry Goldberg with Bob Dylan
- Tom "T-Bone" Wolk
- Robbie Kondor
- Billy Mernit
- Arthur Gorson
- Thom Bishop
- Elly Brown
- David Sutherland
- Claude Pelanne/WCVB-Boston
- Jérôme Laperrousaz
