= Class Action (band) =

Disco and post-disco musical projects

Class Action Phreek
- Origin: New York City, U.S.
- Genres: Garage house; post-disco
- Years active: 1978–1983
- Labels: Sleeping Bag; Atlantic
- Past members: Christine Wiltshire; Leroy Burgess; Patrick Adams; Stan Lucas; Ken Mazur

Class Action and Phreek were disco and post-disco musical projects. The original Phreek comprised Christine Wiltshire, Leroy Burgess, Patrick Adams, Stan Lucas, Ken Mazur and others. Class Action was directed by Larry Levan and featured Christine Wiltshire as vocalist. Both groups are best known for their club hit "Weekend", written by James Calloway and Leroy Burgess. The 1983 version was remixed by Morales and Munzibai and Larry Levan and produced by Bob Blank and Lola Blank.

== History ==
The song "Weekend" was originally recorded on Atlantic Records by Patrick Adams' studio group Phreek of which Wiltshire was a member. The song was heavily played by Larry Levan yet it was commercially unavailable so it did not enter any charts. In the early 1980s, William Socolov, the co-owner of Sleeping Bag Records, invited Levan to make a new version of "Weekend". This version, recorded by the studio group Class Action, which also featured Wiltshire, became more successful than the original version, peaking at No. 49 on the British pop chart and No. 9 on the Billboard Dance chart. The recording gained more success in 1991, when it was sampled on "I Can't Take The Power" by Off-Shore, which reached the UK top ten.

== Discography ==
=== Phreek ===
Albums

- 1978: Patrick Adams Presents Phreek (Atlantic)

Singles

- 1978: "Weekend / "Have a Good Day" (Atlantic)
- 1978: "Weekend / "May My Love Be with You" (Atlantic)
- 1983: "Weekend" (original version) (Atlantic)

=== Class Action ===
Singles

- 1983: "Weekend" (Sleeping Bag)

=== Track listings ===
Phreek version

12" single	Side A: 1. "Weekend" (James Calloway, Leroy Burgess) – 8:12; Side B: 1. "Have a Good Day" (Patrick Adams, Venus Dodson) – 5:44; Mix: Issy Sanchez (A), Patrick Adams (B); Producer: Leroy Burgess, Patrick Adams

Class Action version

12" single	Weekday Side: 1. "Week End" (Vocal) – 9:38; 2. "Week End" (Dub) – 8:34; Weekend Side: 1. "Week End" (Vocal) – 8:21; 2. "Week End" (Acapella) – 3:03; Mix: Sergio Munzibai, John Morales (A1, A2, B2), Larry Levan (B1); Written by: James Calloway, Leroy Burgess; Producer: Bob Blank, Lola Blank

=== Chart performance ===
Year	Title	Label	Peak chart positions	
Year	Title	Label	US Dance	UK
1978	"Weekend" (by Phreek)	Atlantic	―	―
1983	"Weekend" (by Class Action)	Sleeping Bag	9	49

== Legacy ==
- The Canadian group Killer Bunnies used the opening lyrics from "Weekend" as the basis for their 1997 single "I Can't Take the Heartbreak", which peaked at No. 36 on Billboard's Dance Club Songs chart that same year.
- The song is featured in the 2006 video game Grand Theft Auto: Vice City Stories, on the Paradise FM radio station.
- In 1988, the song was covered by Todd Terry Project. This version also appeared in the 2004 video game Grand Theft Auto: San Andreas, on the SF-UR radio station.
- In 2004, Class Action's version was reissued on the Warlock record label.
