= Black Ivory =

American R&B musical group

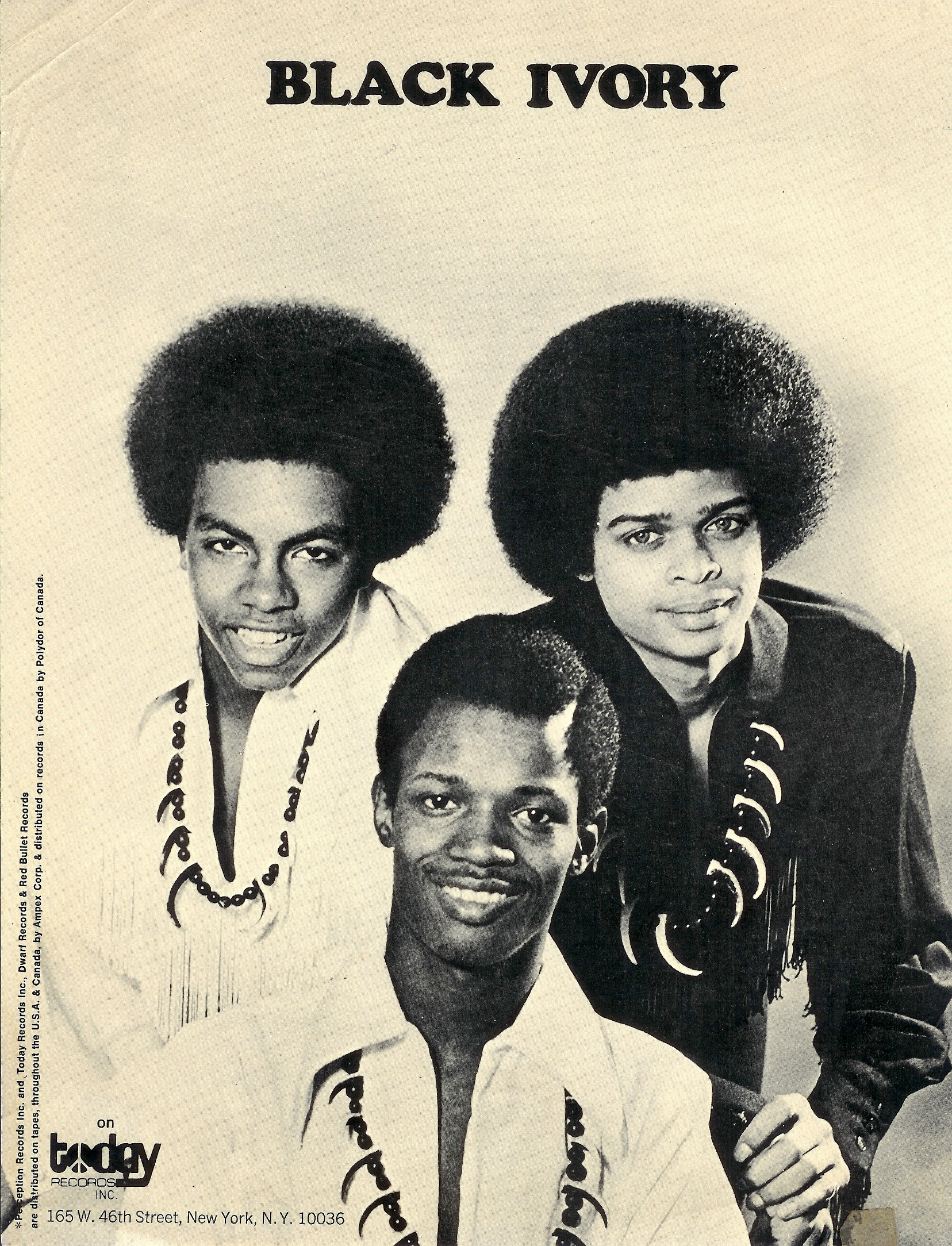
- Black Ivory in 1971

Background information
- Genres: R&B, soul, funk, disco
- Years active: 1969–present
- Labels: Today Records; Perception; Kwanzaa Records; Warner Bros.; Buddah
- Members: Leroy Burgess; Stuart Bascombe; Russell Patterson
- Website: blackivory.com/home

External videos
- "Black Ivory Performing their debut single, Don't Turn Around in 1972 Performance on Soul!"

Black Ivory is an American R&B group from Harlem, which had a number of hits in the 1970s, including "Don't Turn Around", "You and I", "I'll Find A Way", "Time Is Love", and "Will We Ever Come Together".

Black Ivory was inducted into the Atlantic City Walk of Fame at Brighton Park on April 27, 2026.

== History ==
=== Early days ===
The group was originally known as the Mellow Souls and formed in Harlem, New York in the summer of 1969. Members included all teenagers, Lawrence (Larry) Newkirk, Froilan (Vito) Ramirez, Michael Harris, Leroy Burgess and Stuart Bascombe. The group got their start by auditioning over the phone with musician Patrick Adams. After meeting with them, he took the group under his tutelage. Adams began to train and develop the group and he decided that five were too many to work with, and Harris left the group. In time, the four remaining members, now calling themselves Black Ivory, began performing at private parties, block parties and social programs. In their second live performance they won a talent show at Roosevelt High School in the Bronx. Adams, in an effort to get the group signed, began negotiations with Gene Redd Jr., for a possible deal with his label Red Coach Records. Redd Jr., was also the manager for the band Kool & the Gang, and in order to give Black Ivory exposure, he arranged for the group to open the show for the Gang at a number of East Coast venues. In 1970 Russell Patterson replaced Ramirez, and Newkirk left the group to pursue higher education. The remaining members Leroy Burgess, Stuart Bascombe and Russell Patterson became the trio we know today as Black Ivory.

The group traveled to Philadelphia and recorded two songs at Sigma Sound Studios produced by Patrick Adams. The songs, "Don't Turn Around" and "I Keep Asking You Questions" would become the "A" and "B" sides of the Black Ivory's first single released on the Today Label, with which Adams had subsequently secured a deal for the group.

=== Career ===
The group features songwriter and prolific disco producer Leroy Burgess, Stuart Bascombe, and Russell Patterson. They were managed by Patrick Adams, an executive at the Today/Perception record company. Burgess was the lead voice of the majority of their hits in the early 1970s. Their 1972 debut album, Don't Turn Around, became a top 20 hit spending 19 weeks on the Billboard R&B albums chart and peaking at No. 13. Black Ivory scored three top 40 R&B hits in 1972, including the singles "Don't Turn Around" (No. 38) and "You and I" (No. 32) from their debut album. Another single from that album, "I'll Find a Way (The Loneliest Man in Town)" peaked at No. 46 on the Billboard R&B singles chart. Their single, "Time Is Love", was the third top 40 R&B hit, peaking at No. 37. Other charting singles include "Spinning Around" (No. 45), "What Goes Around (Comes Around)" (No. 44), and "Will We Ever Come Together" (No. 40). Although they recorded several uptempo tracks, such as "Big Apple Rock", "Walking Downtown (On a Saturday Night)", "What Goes Around (Comes Around)" and later, "Mainline" with Russell Patterson as lead singer (written by Burgess, but recorded after he left the group in 1977), they were primarily known for sweet soul ballads.

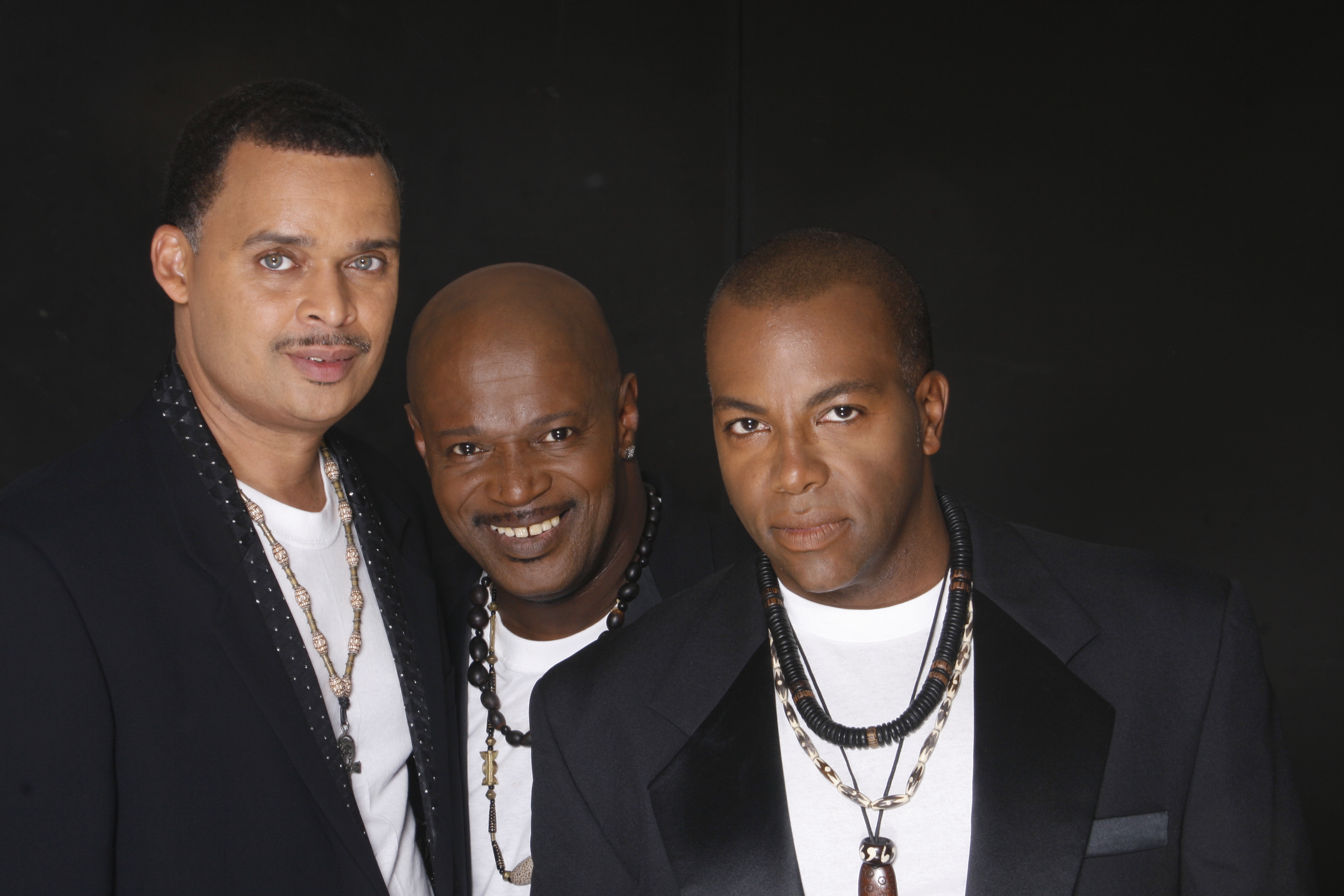
(l to r) Stuart Bascombe, Leroy Burgess, & Russell Patterson in 2007

Black Ivory appeared on season three of Soul Train on June 1, 1974, and on the PBS television show, Soul! in 1972.

In 1974, Billboard's writer Bob Ford, stated that Black Ivory were one of the best up and coming R&B acts. Early in their career, Black Ivory's songs were covered by other artists on Today/Perception, a common practice with the label. Label-mates J.J. Barnes, The Eight Minutes, Debbie Taylor, and Lucky Peterson all covered Black Ivory tunes.

The group recorded several uptempo songs in the disco vein, such as "Big Apple Rock", "Walking Downtown (On a Saturday Night)", "What Goes Around (Comes Around)" and, later, "Mainline" but, not being known for the style, they were unable to compete when disco became the dominant music style. While he was with Black Ivory, Burgess frequently collaborated with Adams in writing songs. He also wrote the groups' hit, "Mainline", which featured Russell Patterson on lead and was recorded while he was on hiatus from the group. After Burgess left in 1977, Bascombe and Patterson continued on as a duo until the early 1980s before disbanding.

In 1995, the group reunited and returned to the stage on the Classic Soul circuit, featuring all three original members, with Stuart Bascombe doing most of the leads. They have been performing and recording together ever since. In recent years, Black Ivory has released a Christmas single entitled "Snow", written by Burgess and Patterson, and in November 2011, Black Ivory composed, produced and released a new album, Continuum on their own label SLR Records.

Black Ivory are one of the featured artists and commentators in the award-winning 2018 documentary, Mr. Soul!! a film based on the host and executive producer of Soul!, Ellis Haizlip, the first "black Tonight Show". In 1968, Soul! was launched as a local, New York broadcast. In 1969, the series rolled out nationwide on PBS, on WNET Channel 13. Haizlip had produced over 130 hour-long shows featuring an array of guests.

Leroy Burgess and Stuart Bascombe are contributing writers on the single, "Gettin' Up" on rapper and musician Q-Tip's nominated Best Rap Album of The Year, The Renaissance (Q-Tip album), at the 52nd Annual Grammy Awards.

Black Ivory celebrated their 50th Anniversary in 2019 in the music industry. They received multiple awards and proclamations throughout 2019 commemorating their milestone including a 13-page article in the London magazine, The Soul Survivors. They performed and received awards at London's Famous Jazz Cafe on October 19, 2019.

In 2022, Black Ivory along with the entire cast of, Mr. Soul! The Movie, received Peabody Awards for Best Documentary.

As of 2023, Black Ivory is the only soul/R&B groups from the 1970s who are still performing with all of the original members from their first recordings.

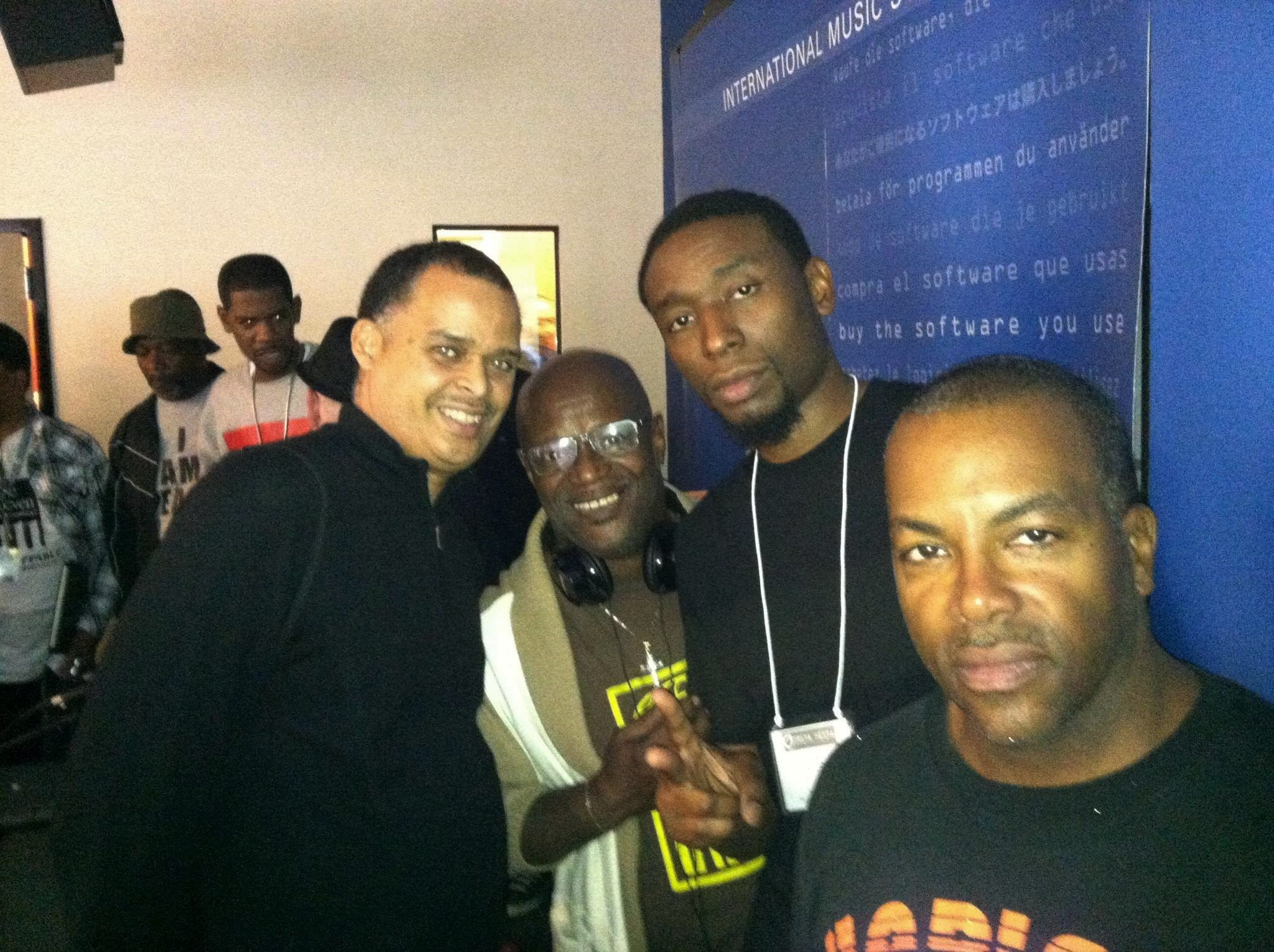
Black Ivory with Record Producer 9th Wonder attending IMSTA Festa at SAE Institute in NYC September 2012

Black Ivory are contributing performers on rapper JID song, "For Keeps" which sampled Black Ivory's 1971 song "Don't Turn Around". It is on JID 2025 album entitled, "God Does Like Ugly", which was nominated for Best Rap Album at the 2026 Grammy Awards.

On April 27, 2026, Black Ivory was inducted into the Atlantic City Walk of Fame presented by, The National R&B Music Society. Mic Murphy of The System inducted them. Tavares, Sister Sledge, Melba Moore, Billy Paul and Roy Ayers were also inducted as part of the 2026 Class.

=== Legacy ===
In recent years, some of Black Ivory's work has been sampled by a number of artists.

- Raekwon sampled "I Keep Asking You Questions" for his song Criminology on his acclaimed 1995 album, Only Built 4 Cuban Linx.
- He also sampled the same song in 2005 for his single, "Criminology 2.5", that featured Ghostface Killah and Method Man, from the album, "Wu-Massacre".
- E.U., Washington, D.C.–based go-go/funk band covered, "Don't Turn Around" on their 1989 on his album, "Livin' Large".
- In 2000, Barbara Tucker reached number one on the Billboard dance chart with her single, "Stop Playing with My Mind", which sampled "Mainline".
- In 2002 Rapper Nas sampled, "We Made It", for his song, "Revolutionary Warfare" from his top charting Platinum R&B album, "God's Son".
- Brother Ali in 2004 sampled, "It's Time to Say Goodbye" on his track "Love On Display" from his Champion EP.
- In his 2006 Beat Konducta Vol.1-2: Movie Scenes, Madlib sampled "You and I" in his beat titled "The Understanding (Comprehension)".
- In 2008, Rapper and Musician Q-Tip's sampled, "You and I" on his hit single, "Gettin' Up" on his 2008 Grammy nominated Best Rap Album The Renaissance.
- Lil B sampled "Surrender" for his track "Surrender To Me" on the White Flame mixtape.
- In 2005, Omarion sampled "Don't Turn Around" on the remix of his song "I'm Gonna Try (Pt. 2)".
- 9th Wonder sampled "Love Won't You Stay" on Kaze's "For the Record", and he sampled "Warm Inside" on JustMyThoughtsSoul!!!! from the album, Tutankhamen (Valley of the Kings).
- Rapper Mac Miller sampled, "Warm Inside" for his single "Outside", on the mix tape, K.I.D.S. (mixtape).

== Members ==
Formed in Harlem, New York, in 1969.

- Leroy Burgess (born August 19, 1953)
- Stuart Bascombe (born January 20, 1954)
- Russell Patterson (born April 1, 1954)

== Discography ==
=== Studio albums ===
Year	Album	Peak chart positions		Record label
Year	Album	US	US R&B	Record label
1972	Don't Turn Around	158	13	Today Records
1972	Baby, Won't You Change Your Mind	188	26	Today Records
1975	Feel It	—	—	Buddah Records
1976	Black Ivory	—	—	Buddah Records
1979	Hangin' Heavy	—	—	Buddah Records/Arista Records
1984	Then and Now	—	—	Panoramic Records
2011	Continuum	—	—	SLR Records
"—" denotes a recording that did not chart.

=== Compilation albums ===
Year	Album	Record label
1991	Black Ivory / Hangin' Heavy	Unidisc
1993	Don't Turn Around - A Golden Classics Edition	Collectables Records Corp.
1997	Black Ivory Vs Odds and Ends	Sequel Records
2000	Spinning Around (The Today Sessions)	Castle Music
2009	Black Ivory Meet the Escorts	Collectables Records Corp
2012	Black Ivory / Hangin' Heavy	Funkytown Grooves
2017	Anthology	Play Back Records

=== Singles ===
Year	Title	Peak chart positions		
Year	Title	US	US R&B	US Dance
1971	"Don't Turn Around"	—	38	—
1971	"I Keep Asking You Questions"	—	—	—
1972	"You and I"	111	32	—
1972	"Our Future?"	—	—	—
1972	"I'll Find a Way"	—	46	—
1972	"Surrender"	—	—	—
1972	"Time Is Love"	—	37	—
1972	"Got to Be There"	—	—	—
1973	"Spinning Around"	—	45	—
1973	"Find the One Who Loves You"	—	—	—
1973	"We Made It"	—	—	—
1973	"Just Leave Me Some"	—	—	—
1974	"What Goes Around (Comes Around)"	—	44	—
1974	"No One Else Will Ever Do"	—	—	—
1975	"Will We Ever Come Together"	—	40	—
1975	"Feel It"	—	—	—
1975	"Warm Inside"	—	—	—
1975	"Love Won't You Stay"	—	—	—
1975	"You Mean Everything to Me"	—	—	—
1976	"Walking Downtown (Saturday Night)"	—	—	—
1978	"You Turned My Whole World Around"	—	—	—
1979	"Mainline"	—	—	57
1984	"You Are My Lover"	—	73	—
1985	"I've Got My Eye on You"	—	—	18
"—" denotes a recording that did not chart.
