= The Renaissance (Q-Tip album) =

Studio album by Q-Tip
- Released: November 4, 2008
- Recorded: 2003–2008
- Studios: Legacy Recording Studios (New York City); The Abstract Ranch (New Jersey)
- Genre: Progressive hip-hop
- Length: 43:17
- Label: Universal Motown
- Producers: Q-Tip; J Dilla

Q-Tip chronology
Amplified (1999)	The Renaissance (2008)	Kamaal the Abstract (2009)

Singles from The Renaissance
- 1. "Gettin' Up" Released: August 26, 2008; 2. "Move" Released: October 15, 2008; 3. "Life Is Better" Released: October 8, 2009

The Renaissance is the second studio album by American hip-hop artist Q-Tip, released on November 4, 2008, through Universal Motown Records. The follow-up to his solo debut album, Amplified (1999), it was recorded after Q-Tip's Kamaal the Abstract (2009) was initially shelved in 2002 by his former label Arista Records and his proposed effort Open was shelved by Universal Motown, both deemed commercially inadequate by the labels. The Renaissance was produced primarily by Q-Tip and features guest contributions by D'Angelo, Norah Jones, Amanda Diva, and Raphael Saadiq.

The album debuted at number 11 on the U.S. Billboard 200 chart, selling 34,219 copies in its first week. It produced three singles and has sold 131,200 copies in the United States. Upon its release, The Renaissance received universal acclaim from music critics, who praised Q-Tip's lyricism and production aesthetic, and earned him a Grammy Award nomination for Best Rap Album.

== Background ==
The album is Q-Tip's second released studio effort, following his solo debut Amplified and the 2002 shelving of Kamaal the Abstract. Q-Tip put together a band for recording The Renaissance. In an interview for Billboard magazine, he discussed his musical direction for the album, stating "I wanted a hip-hop sonic feel, something pure to the sound of hip-hop with real drums, real emotion and people taking solos… In that sense this record feels like we're moving in a new direction … something hip-hop should do". Production for The Renaissance was primarily handled by Q-Tip, with the exception of the J Dilla-produced "Move." The album also features contributions from such artists as Norah Jones, D'Angelo, Raphael Saadiq and Amanda Diva. The album cover art features Q-Tip in a silver suit holding an MPC2000XL in front of his face.

== Release and promotion ==
Following Q-Tip's nine-year hiatus from releasing studio material on a label, The Renaissance was released November 3 in the United Kingdom and November 4, 2008, in the United States on Universal Motown. Q-Tip made appearances during September to November 2008 in promotion of the album, including performances at Santos Party House, the Knitting Factory, VH1 Hip Hop Honors, and the Late Show with David Letterman. Music videos have been made for "Gettin' Up", "Move", "Renaissance Rap","Life Is Better" and "Manwomanboogie". There is also a remix to "Gettin' Up" featuring Eve produced by Swizz Beatz, a remix to "Renaissance Rap" featuring Raekwon, Busta Rhymes, and Lil Wayne., and a remix to "We Fight/We Love" featuring Kanye West & Consequence.

== Reception ==
=== Commercial performance ===
The Renaissance debuted at number 11 on the U.S. Billboard 200 chart with first-week sales of 34,219 copies. It has sold 131,200 copies in the United States, according to Nielsen Soundscan.

=== Critical response ===
Professional ratings
Aggregate scores
Source	Rating
Metacritic	82/100
Review scores
Source	Rating
AllMusic	4.5/5 stars
The A.V. Club	B
Entertainment Weekly	A
The Guardian	4/5 stars
Los Angeles Times	3.5/4 stars
Mojo	4/5 stars
Pitchfork	8.4/10
Q	4/5 stars
Spin	4/5 stars
USA Today	4/4 stars

The Renaissance received universal acclaim from music critics. At Metacritic, which assigns a normalized rating out of 100 to reviews from mainstream critics, the album received an average score of 82, based on 24 reviews. Chicago Tribune writer Greg Kot praised Q-Tip's rapping and production, commenting that "Comebacks don't come more effortlessly than this". Anthony Henriques of PopMatters complimented its "Ummah-era aesthetic – smooth, soulful, jazz-infused" production, writing that "The Renaissance feels like a complete album. Each song has distinctive characteristics, and brilliant sequencing allows for seamless transitions between tracks". About.com's Shannon Barbour called it "a polished production that makes the most of every song". Chicago Sun-Times writer Jim DeRogatis commented that guest appearances by Raphael Saadiq, Norah Jones, and D'Angelo "sound inspired".

Steve Jones of USA Today complimented Q-Tip's "ever-cool flow over a self-produced blend of jazzy samples and live instrumentation", stating "Q-Tip delivers danceable rhymes, mostly about love of self, women and hip-hop. He also touches society and music industry politics with an intelligence often lacking in today's music". Barry Walters of Spin noted "his eloquent flow over liquid arrangements shimmering with rhythmic finesse" and commented that the album "blurs distinctions between accessibility and avant-gardism". The Guardian's Angus Batey wrote that the album "cloak[s] its eclecticism with a homogenising sheen […] frequent changes of mood and direction dazzle". Areif Sless-Kitain of Time Out viewed it as a return for Q-Tip to lyrical "old-school basics", stating "It’s a reverse renaissance: The suave MC returns to his glory days as part of the Native Tongues posse, showcasing his nimble rhymes and clever phrasing". In his Consumer Guide, Robert Christgau gave the album a one-star honorable mention while picking out its two songs ("Shaka" and "Official"), and quipped, "If jazz lite it must be, by all means, rap on top."

=== Accolades ===
Entertainment Weekly ranked The Renaissance number five on its list of the year's best albums, and PopMatters named it the best hip-hop album of 2008. The Renaissance received a Grammy Award nomination for Best Rap Album in 2010. The album was also included in the book 1001 Albums You Must Hear Before You Die.

== Track listing ==
- All tracks produced by Q-Tip, except tracks 8 and 14 produced by J Dilla.

No.	Title	Writer(s)	Length
1.	"Johnny Is Dead"	Fareed, Rosenwinkel	3:02
2.	"Won't Trade"	Bridges, Eaton, Fareed, Knight	2:41
3.	"Gettin' Up"	Fareed	3:18
4.	"Official"	Fareed	3:19
5.	"You"	Fareed	3:02
6.	"We Fight/We Love" (featuring Raphael Saadiq)	Fareed	4:47
7.	"Manwomanboogie" (featuring Amanda Diva)	Czukay, Fareed, Gee, Karoli, Liebezeit, Schmidt	3:06
8.	"Move / Renaissance Rap"	Davis, Fareed, Fletcher, Parks	5:49
9.	"Dance on Glass"	Fareed	3:02
10.	"Life Is Better" (featuring Norah Jones)	Fareed, Glasper	4:41
11.	"Believe" (featuring D'Angelo)	Fareed	2:57
12.	"Shaka"	Fareed, Rosenwinkel	3:33

Bonus tracks
No.	Title	Writer(s)	Length
13.	"Good Thang" (Digital bonus track)	Fareed	3:30
14.	"Feva" (UK & Circuit City bonus track)	Fareed	3:48

Sample credits

Credits adapted from liner notes.

- "Gettin' Up" samples "You and I" by Black Ivory.
- "Move" samples "Dancing Machine" by The Jackson 5.
- "Renaissance Rap" samples "Will O' The Wisp" by Steve Howe.
- "Won't Trade" samples "You Made a Believer Out of Me" by Ruby Andrews.
- "Manwomanboogie" samples "Aspectacle" by Can.
- "We Fight/We Love" samples "Meaningless" by Café Jacques.

== Personnel ==
Credits for The Renaissance adapted from liner notes.

- Antuan Barrett – bass (tracks 3, 6, 7 and 10)
- Sandy Brummels – creative director
- Marc Cary – keyboards (track 3)
- Danny Clinch – photography
- Mark Colenburg – drums (tracks 1, 4, 7, 10, 11 and 12), keyboards (tracks 6 and 10)
- Ed Richardson – A&R manager for Universal Motown
- Amanda Diva – background vocals (track 7)
- Phylicia Fant – publicity
- Kamaal Fareed (Q-Tip) – bass (tracks 5 and 9), drums (tracks 3 and 6), keyboards (tracks 9 and 11), programming (tracks 1, 5, 6 and 9), engineer, producer, mixing
- Tatia Fox – marketing
- Robert Glasper – keyboards (tracks 5 and 10)
- Derrick Hodge – bass (tracks 1 and 4)
- James A. Hunt – keyboards (tracks 4 and 12)
- Norah Jones – background vocals (track 10)
- Mike Moreno – guitar (track 7)
- Kurt Rosenwinkel – guitar (tracks 1, 4, 6 and 12)
- Raphael Saadiq – bass (track 11), background vocals (track 6)
- Chris Sholar – guitar (track 5)
- Blair Wells – engineer, mixing

== Charts ==
Chart (2008)	Peak position
French Albums (SNEP)	176
US Billboard 200	11
US Top R&B/Hip-Hop Albums (Billboard)	3
