= Gettin' Up =

"Gettin’ Up"

Single by Q-Tip

from the album The Renaissance
- Released: August 26, 2008
- Genre: Hip hop
- Length: 3:27
- Label: Universal Motown
- Songwriter: Fareed
- Producer: Q-Tip

Q-Tip singles chronology
"Enuff" (2006)	"Gettin’ Up" (2008)	"Move" (2008)

'Gettin' Up' is a song by American hip hop recording artist Q-Tip, released as the lead single from his album The Renaissance.

The music video was directed by Ben Dickinson, produced by Karen Lin and edited by D.J Sing. It was the free music video of the week November 18–25 on iTunes. The song peaked at No. 7 on the Billboard Bubbling Under R&B/Hip-Hop Singles and features a sample from Black Ivory's "You and I". The track also received a UK release on December 1, 2008.

The official remix features a guest verse from fellow American rapper Eve and production by Swizz Beatz. The remix samples Puff Daddy's "It's All about the Benjamins". A second remix, produced by DJ Scratch, features Busta Rhymes and appears on his collaborative mixtape with Q-Tip, The Abstract and the Dragon.
