= Leroy Burgess =

American music producer (born 1953)

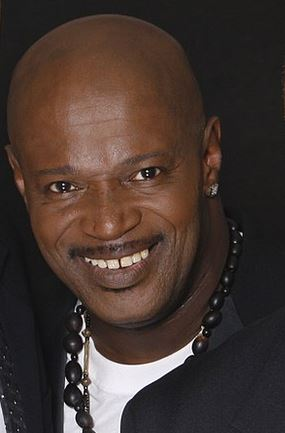
- Photo shoot 2007 in New York City

Background information
- Born: Leroy O'Neil Jackson Jr. August 20, 1953 (age 73); New York, New York, United States
- Origin: Harlem, New York City
- Genres: R&B, disco, funk, soul, boogie
- Occupations: Composer, Lyricist, Record Producer, Vocalist, Arranger, Conductor, Keyboardist
- Instruments: Piano, keyboards
- Years active: 1968–present
- Label: Multiple

Leroy O'Neil Jackson Jr. (born August 20, 1953), known by his stage name Leroy Burgess, is an American singer, songwriter, keyboard player, recording artist, arranger and record producer.

Burgess is a member of Black Ivory and lead vocalist on the majority of their hits in the early 1970s, he made his debut with the group at the age of 16.

== Early life ==
Burgess grew up in Harlem, one of seven children. His mother, Myrtle Bell Burgess (a classically trained Contralto) initially disapproved of his desire to become a musician, while his stepfather, Morgan Burgess secretly approved and supported his efforts. Burgess' Bell bloodline includes members of Kool & the Gang, Philly composer/producer/arranger Thom Bell, singer Betty Wright, singer Archie Bell and former Stax/Volt President Al Bell.

== Career ==
In 1970, Black Ivory, (Burgess, Stuart Bascombe and Russell Patterson) was signed by small East Coast label Today/Perception, which was run by Terry Phillips and Boo Frazier. Patrick Adams, who was A&R director of the label was also the band's manager. Burgess frequently collaborated with Adams in writing songs.

The group scored a number of R&B hits in the 1970s, including "Don't Turn Around" (a top 40 R&B hit released in 1969), "You And I", "I'll Find a Way (The Loneliest Man in Town)", "Spinning Around", "What Goes Around (Comes Around)" and "Will We Ever Come Together". Though they recorded several uptempo tracks, such as "Big Apple Rock", "Walking Downtown (On a Saturday Night)", "What Goes Around (Comes Around)" and, later, "Mainline" (written by Burgess, but recorded after he left the group), Black Ivory faced tough competition from the rise of disco, but proved unable to compete when disco became the dominant music style. However, "Mainline" broke through the group's difficulties of creating a hit dance record and has since become an internationally revered dance classic.

As a solo artist, Burgess had numerous club hits, beginning in the late 1970s and early 1980s including "Let's Do It", "Fire Night Dance", "Heartbreaker", "Stranger" and "You Got That Something". Burgess chose to take a hiatus from Black Ivory in 1977, and developed several bands of his own, which include Convertion and LOGG, before joining twins TaharQa and TundeRa Aleem as their Lead vocalist Aleem, which had R&B songs such as "Love's on Fire"(1986), "Confusion", "Release Yourself", and "Hooked On Your Love". A 1991 release by the band titled "Running After You" received favourable reviews on release. He also continued to work with producer Adams in various studio groups. In addition to the hits he had with Aleem, Burgess was featured vocalist with Adams' groups Bumble Bee Unlimited, Logg, Inner Life (which also featured Jocelyn Brown), the Universal Robot Band, the Peter Jacques Band, Dazzle and M.O.D.E. (with whom he recorded "Heaven"), and did lead vocals on "Much Too Much" by Phreek.

"Burgess has a long and storied career in American R&B and disco".

Burgess wrote and produced a substantial number of hits for other artists as well, including "Big Time" for Rick James, and wrote and performed on the Bob Blank production of Fonda Rae's hit "Over Like A Fat Rat". He also sang background and played keyboard on many of the productions., He also co-composed (with James Calloway and Sonny T. Davenport) "Stomp Your Feet" by Herbie Mann and "Never Used to Dance" by Eddie Kendricks.

He supplied vocals for the Cassius tracks "Under Influence" and "Til We Got You And Me", from their album Au Rêve.

Burgess is a contributing writer on Wu-Tang Clan rapper, Raekwon's single, "Criminology" off of his 1995 hit album Only Built 4 Cuban Linx.... On October 2, 1995, the album was certified Gold by the RIAA.

Two CDs have been released containing his work with Black Ivory, one of the first album and the second, consisting of their first two albums. Burgess also released two Anthology albums of his own on London's Soul Brother Records label entitled Anthology: Volume One: The Voice and Anthology: Volume Two: The Producer, which chronicled his work in the 1980s.

In 2007, Burgess released Throwback: Harlem 79-83, followed in 2010 by Throwback: Vol.II: Sugar Hill 82-86, the first albums under his own name and most recently in 2011, Continuum, the reunion album with Black Ivory.

Burgess is a contributing writer on the single, "Gettin' Up" on rapper and musician Q-Tip's album, The Renaissance, which was nominated for Best Rap Album at the 52nd Annual Grammy Awards in 2010.

In 2019, Burgess teamed up with Louie Vega and Patrick Adams for a new project, "Louie Vega Presents Leroy Burgess & The Universal Robot Band Feat. Patrick Adams – Barely Breaking Even", released in September 2019.

In October 2019, while on a European tour with his new band from Lyon, France called Saving Coco, group members of Black Ivory (Stuart Bascombe and Russell Patterson), joined Burgess on stage and performed for the first time together at London's Famous Jazz Cafe. where they also received Lifetime Achievement Awards commemorating Black Ivory 50th Anniversary. In addition, Black Ivory was featured in a 13-page article in the London magazine, The Soul Survivors

Burgess is a Founding Member of the National R&B Music Society Inc.

Burgess still performs as a member of Black Ivory and continues to perform as a solo artist with Saving Coco, overseas.

Burgess now records exclusively through his own record label, Burgess Entertainment Recordings/PROS International, and has released several singles under that moniker.. including "Jesus Children Of America"(2017), "Barely Breaking Even" (2019) with Louie Vega and Patrick Adams (through a partnership with BBE Records and Vega Records), "Dance Till U Can't" (2021) (through a partnership with Omniverse Records) and most recently "Somewhere" (2021) from his forthcoming album, "These Days".

Further in 2022, Burgess released his "These Days" album, followed by "These Days/The Remixes" in 2023, which featured remixes from Louie Vega, The Reflex, Marc Mac, Kenny Carpenter, Stacy Kidd and PL Sweets to notable critical success. He continues to work with Vega and others, creating new music and new releases. He is in high demand for his string and orchestral arranging skills. His label, Burgess Entertainment Recordings/PROS International introduced new artists Tyrone Williams, PL Sweets and newcomer Dungeon Jones.

Burgess recently added Film Scoring to his impressive resume, creating the scores for a number of films written and directed by nephew/stepson Andrew MrTwo'Oh Jackson, including "Affliction" and "Game On".

As of 2025, he celebrates 56 years in the music industry and his 72nd birthday.

== Discography ==
As Black Ivory

As Aleem featuring Leroy Burgess

Albums

- Casually Formal (1986)
- Shock! (1987)

Singles

R&B charts

- Release Yourself (1984) ,#83
- Love's on Fire (1986) R&B #23, Dance/Club #16
- Fine Young Tender, #62
- Love Shock, #51

As solo singer

Singles

- "Heartbreaker" (1983)
- "Stranger"

== See also ==
- Soul music
- List of people from Harlem
