= Elliot Willensky =

American composer (1943–2010)

Elliot A. Willensky (August 6, 1943 – March 29, 2010) was an American composer, lyricist and music producer. He wrote Michael Jackson's first solo hit "Got to Be There" and the Jermaine Jackson/Whitney Houston duet "If You Say My Eyes Are Beautiful." Willensky composed the music for the 1999 off-Broadway musical Abby's Song and served as the music coordinator for the Tony Orlando and Dawn variety show on CBS.

== Biography ==
He was born in Bayonne, New Jersey on August 6, 1943, to Raymond Willensky and Gertrude Berlin. He attended Bayonne High School and graduated from Boston University with a degree in biology. He undertook post-graduate studies at Boston University and the University of Massachusetts Amherst and worked as a research scientist of the National Institutes of Health. Willensky left the scientific field to become a songwriter in 1969.

Arguably Willensky's most well-known work is "Got to Be There," which was Michael Jackson's first solo hit and reached number 4 on the R&B singles chart in 1971. The song reached number 5 on the R&B chart again in 1983 when it was covered by Chaka Khan. The song has also been covered by The Miracles in 1972, Boyz II Men in 2007, and an instrumental version by jazz guitarist/singer George Benson in 1993.

Willensky continued his affiliation with the Jackson family into the 1980s, writing the noted Jermaine Jackson and Whitney Houston duet, "If You Say My Eyes Are Beautiful," which appeared on Jermaine's 1986 Precious Moments album.

He died from a stroke on March 29, 2010 in Summit, New Jersey.

In 2021, a play entitled Elliot and Me, conceptualized by Elliot Willensky and his younger brother Steven Willensky, and finished after Elliot's death by Steven Willensky and Scott Coulter, debuted at the Hudson Theater Works in Weehawken, New Jersey.
