= Perception Records =

American record label

Perception Records was an American jazz/R&B record label.

What originally began as a production company in 1967 for pop and progressive rock acts, singer/songwriter/producer Jimmy Curtiss transitioned into Perception Ventures in 1969. Eventually expanding its roster to cater to other music genres, Perception's soul music output was released by both of its flagship labels, Perception Records and Today Records, the latter of which was run by Perception's executive vice-president, Patrick Adams.

Its parent label is Perception Ventures, Inc.

== Discography ==
| # | Artist | Album | Year |
|---|---|---|---|
| 1 | Jimmy Curtiss | J.C. Life | 1969 |
| 2 | Dizzy Gillespie | The Real Thing | 1969 |
| 3 | J. J. Jackson | J. J. Jackson's Dilemma | 1970 |
| 4 | The Albert | The Albert | |
| 5 | Floyd Westerman | Custer Died for Your Sins | 1970 |
| 6 | James Moody | Teachers | 1970 |
| 9 | The Albert | | 1970 |
| 13 | Dizzy Gillespie | Portrait of Jenny | 1970 |
| 14 | Floyd Westerman | Indian Country | |
| 15 | Teina | Touched by the Sun | 1969 |
| 16 | John Simson | We Can Be Everything | |
| 18 | Wanda Robinson | Black Ivory | 1971 |
| 19 | Dizzy Gillespie, Bobby Hackett, Mary Lou Williams | Giants | 1971 |
| 20 | Jon Bartel | Bartel | 1972 |
| 22 | James Moody | Heritage Hum | 1971 |
| 23 | Pendulum | Pendulum | 1972 |
| 24 | Would | Would | 1972 |
| 25 | Tom Sullivan | If You Could See What I Hear | 1972 |
| 27 | The Eight Minutes | An American Family | 1972 |
| 28 | Fatback Band | Let's Do It Again | 1972 |
| 29 | Astrud Gilberto | Astrud Gilberto Now | 1972 |
| 30 | Johnny Hartman | Today | 1972 |
| 31 | Shirley Horn | Where Are You Going | 1973 |
| 33 | Steve Karliski | Gotta Keep Movin' | 1973 |
| 34 | Larry Young | Lawrence of Newark | 1973 |
| 35 | Jimmie Lunceford | The Original... | 1973 |
| 36 | King Harvest | Dancing in the Moonlight | 1972 |
| 37 | Wanda Robinson | Me and a Friend | 1973 |
| 39 | J. J. Barnes | Born Again | 1973 |
| 40 | Tyrone Washington | Roots | 1973 |
| 41 | Johnny Hartman | I've Been There | 1973 |
| 43 | The Fatback Band | People Music | 1973 |
| 45 | Johnny Pate | Brother on the Run (soundtrack) | 1973 |
| 46 | The Fatback Band | Feel My Soul | 1974 |
