= Patrick Adams (musician) =

American music arranger and record producer (1950–2022)

- Born: March 17, 1950; Harlem, New York, U.S.
- Died: June 21, 2022 (aged 72) Manhattan, New York, U.S.
- Genres: Disco, soul, R&B, funk, boogie
- Occupations: Record producer Music arranger Composer
- Years active: 1970s–2000s
- Label: P&P Records

Patrick Peter Owen Adams (March 17, 1950 – June 21, 2022) was an American music arranger and record producer. He earned 32 gold and platinum records.

== Career ==
He was known primarily for his production, songwriting and engineering work on the New York-based Salsoul Records, Prelude Records and major record labels as well as his associations with various recording artists such as Black Ivory (1970s), Inner Life, Jocelyn Brown, Loleatta Holloway, Leroy Burgess, Caress, The Universal Robot Band, Logg, Phreek, and Musique. In addition, Adams worked with hip-hop, R&B and dance/club acts such as Coolio, Cathy Dennis, Keith Sweat, Teddy Riley, R. Kelly, Eric B. & Rakim, Salt-N-Pepa, Shades of Love, and together with Gregory Carmichael at the studio-based disco unit Bumblebee Unlimited, the producer of Lady bug in 1978.

He owned and operated PAPMUS (Patrick Adams Productions Music) in New York City.

== Personal life ==
Adams was one of three children born in Harlem, New York to Finance and Rose Adams; his father was a merchant seaman. He had two natural children; two daughters (C. Joi Sanchez and Tira Adams) and a step-son (Malcolm A. Holmes), though he never married. Adams died on June 12, 2022, in Manhattan, from cancer, at age 72.

== Discography ==
=== Albums ===
- Black Ivory - Don't Turn Around (1971)
- Debbie Taylor - Comin' down on you (1972)
- Caress - Caress (1977)
- Herbie Mann - Supermann (1978)
- Patrick Adams Presents Phreek (1978) (with Phreek)
- Inner Life - "I'm Caught Up" (1979)
- Inner Life - Inner Life (1980)
- Inner Life - Inner LifeII (1982)
- Rainbow Brown - Rainbow Brown (1981)
- Thomas & Taylor - True Love (1985)
- Art Webb - Mr. Flute (1977)

=== Songs ===
Production credits:(selected)

- Inner Life - "I'm Caught Up (in a one-night love affair)" (1979)
- Musique - "In the Bush" (1978)
- Fonda Rae - " Touch Me (All Night Long)" (1984)
- The Universal Robot Band - "Dance and Shake Your Tambourine" (1976)
- Musique - "Keep On Jumpin'" (1978)
- Inner Life - "Ain't No Mountain High Enough" (1981)
- Debbie Taylor - "Romance Without Finance" (1972)
- JJ Barnes - "You Owe It to Yourself" (1973)
- Phreek - "Weekend" (1978)
- Rainbow Brown - "Till You Surrender" (1981)
- Bumblebee Unlimited - "Lady Bug" (1978)
- The Universal Robot Band - "Doing Anything Tonight" (1978)
- Phreek - "May My Love Be with You" (1978)
- The Main Ingredient - "Everything Man" (1977)
- The Eight Minutes - "Looking for a Brand New Game" (1973)
- Venus Dodson - "Shining" (1979)
- Cloud One - "Disco Juice" (1977)
- Four Below Zero - "My Baby's Got E.S.P." (1976)
- Paper Dolls - "Get Down Boy" (1979)
- Personal Touch - "It Ain't No Big Thing" (1976)
- Marta Acuna - "Dance, Dance, Dance" (1977)
- Sammy Gordon and the Hip Huggers - "Making Love" (1976)
- Sine - "Happy Is the Only Way" (1977)
- Mary Clark - "Take Me I'm Yours" (1980)
- Donna McGhee - "I'm a Love Bug" (1978)
- Cloud One - "Atmosphere Strut" (1976)

== See also ==
- Paul Kyser
- Dance music
