= List of the Jacksons band members =

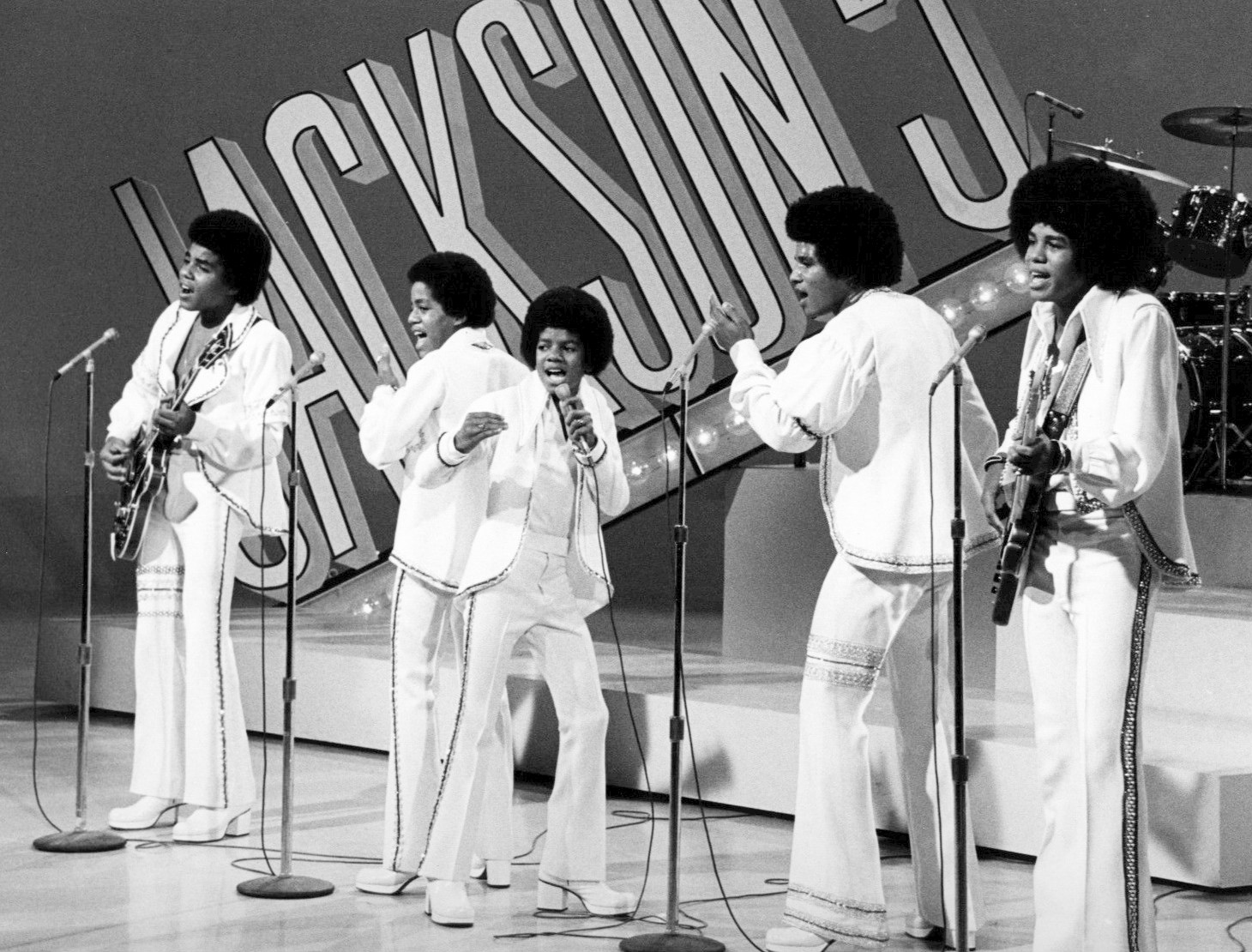
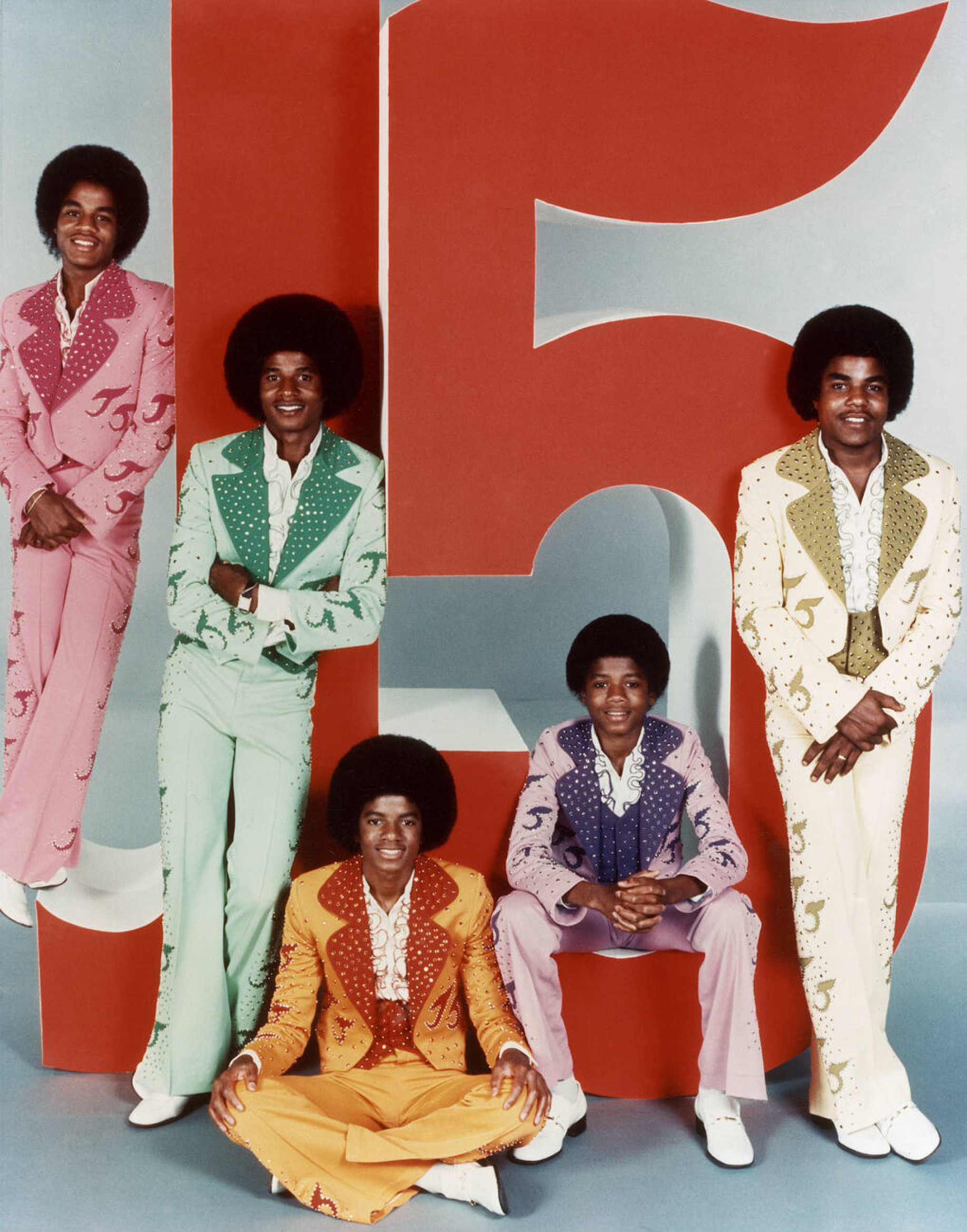
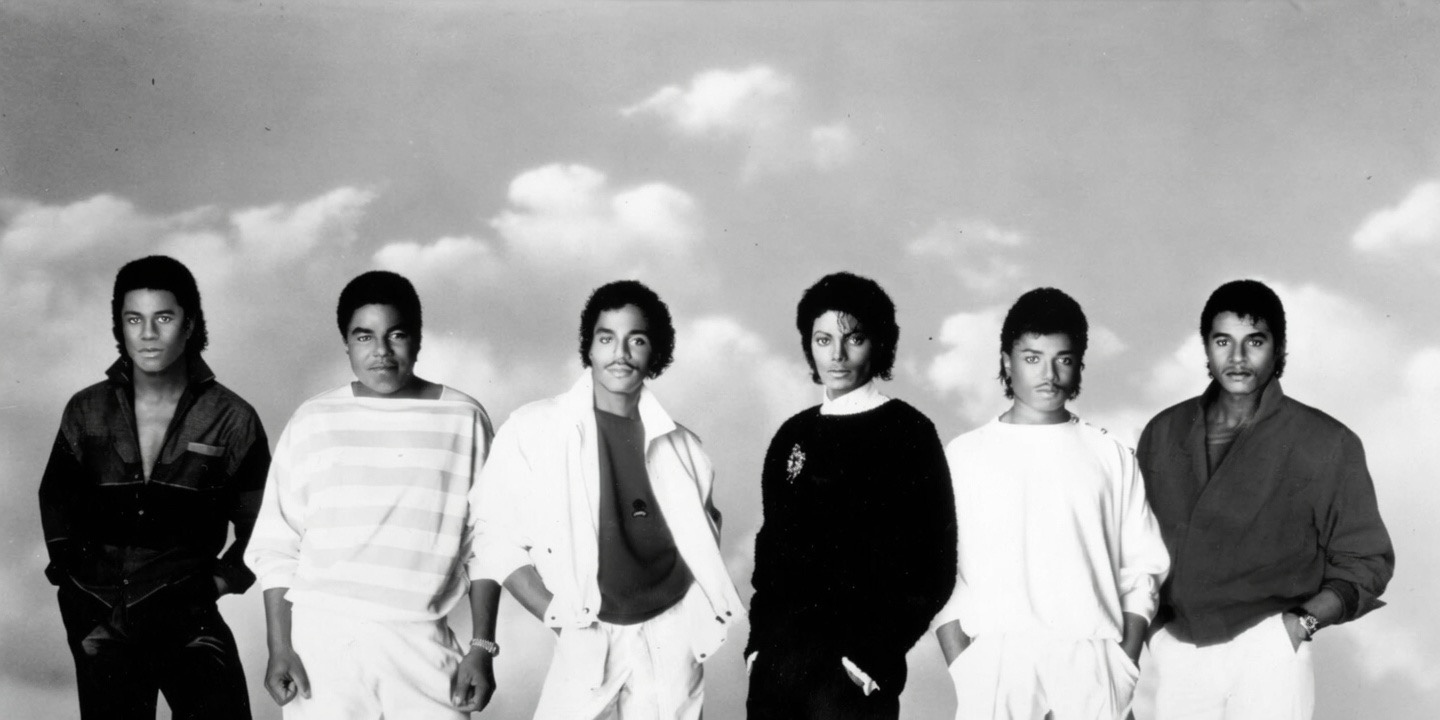
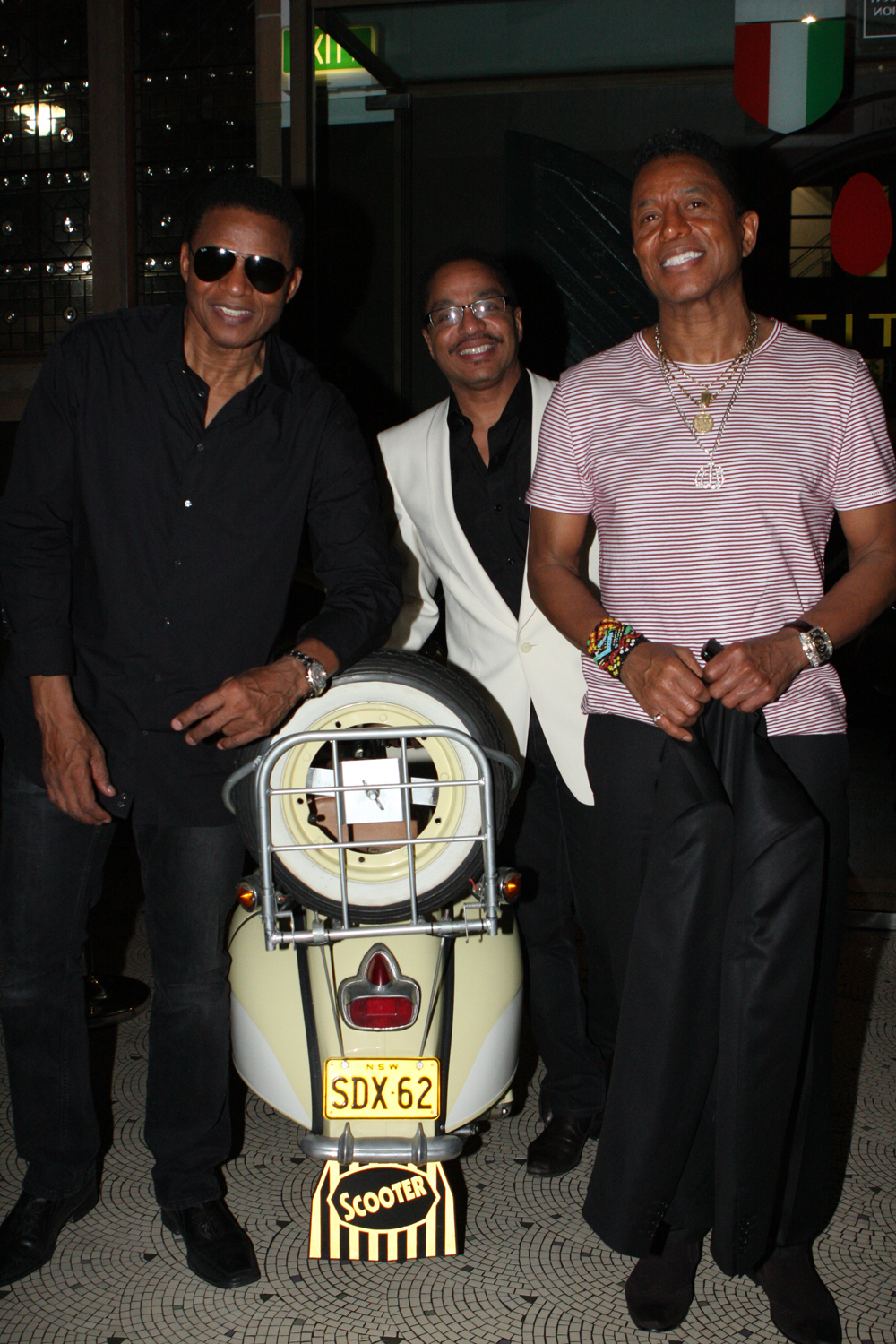
The Jacksons in 1972, 1976, 1984, and 2013

The Jacksons (formerly The Jackson 5) are an American pop band, formed in Gary, Indiana in 1964 by the Jackson brothers, managed by their father Joe Jackson. Their initial and most well-known lineup consisted of Jackie, Tito, Jermaine, Marlon, and Michael.

== History ==
The group played their first shows on the Chitlin' Circuit and eventually signed with Steeltown Records in 1967, under which their first two singles were released. In 1968, they left Steeltown and met Berry Gordy, the founder of Motown. He saw them perform and signed the group to the label. They were the first group to debut with four consecutive number-one hits on the Billboard Hot 100 chart with the songs "I Want You Back" (1969), "ABC", "The Love You Save", and "I'll Be There" (all 1970). Their debut album, Diana Ross Presents The Jackson 5, was released in December 1969.

The Jackson 5 defined black American music as a commercial entity for longer than anyone. The group was defined as one of the first boy bands. Thousands of fans waited for the Jackson 5 wherever they went, and they had to be escorted by the police. During the height of Jacksonmania, crowds would pile up on top of each other to get closer to the stage. Early footage shows girls climbing over seats to get closer, with police officers trying to control the situation. The Jackson 5 became Motown's main marketing focus and the label capitalized on the group's youth appeal, licensing dozens of products, including the J5 heart logo on Johnny Jackson's drum set, the group's album covers, stickers, posters, and coloring books, as well as a board game and a Saturday morning cartoon; Jackson 5ive produced by Rankin/Bass. In order to continue increasing sales, Motown launched Michael Jackson's solo career in 1971 with the hit single "Got to Be There", released in October. His subsequent singles "Rockin’ Robin" and "I Wanna Be Where You Are" from his solo debut album Got to Be There were also hits. His 1972 song "Ben" became his first to top the charts. Jermaine was the second to release a solo project; his most successful hit of the period was a cover of the doo-wop song "Daddy's Home".

The Jacksons announced their decision to depart from Motown at a press conference at the Rainbow Grill in Manhattan, New York City. Joe Jackson then began negotiating to have the group sign a lucrative contract with another company, settling for Epic Records, which had offered a royalty rate of 20% per record; he signed with the company in June 1975. Absent from the deal was Jermaine Jackson, who decided to stay with Motown following his marriage to Hazel Gordy, and Randy Jackson replaced him. Renewing their contract with Epic, the Jacksons were allowed full creative control on their next recording, Destiny, released in December 1978. By 1979, the Jacksons had sold 90 million records. Featuring their best-selling Epic single to date, "Shake Your Body (Down to the Ground)", written by Michael and Randy, the album sold over a million copies. Its follow-up, 1980's Triumph, also sold a million copies, spawning hits such as "Lovely One", "This Place Hotel" and "Can You Feel It". In 1981, they released their fifth album, a live album that eventually sold half a million copies. The live album was culled from recordings of performances on their Triumph Tour.

Following the success of the reunion, all six brothers agreed to record a sixth album for Epic, later released as Victory in 1984, their best-selling album to date. In the same year, the brothers participated in filming a Pepsi commercial where Michael suffered burns to his scalp due to a pyrotechnic fault. In July 1984, the Jacksons launched their Victory Tour, which was overshadowed by Jackie's leg injury, ticket issues, friction between the brothers, and a shakeup in the promotion and marketing team, initially headed by Don King, who was later fired. Michael announced he was leaving the group after their final performance at Dodger Stadium that December to continue his solo career. The following January, Marlon Jackson also announced he was leaving the group to pursue a solo career. At the time of their breakup the Jackson 5 had sold more than 100 million records worldwide. In 1989, the remaining quartet of Jackie, Tito, Jermaine and Randy released the album 2300 Jackson Street. After a brief promotional tour, the group went into hiatus and never recorded another album together.

In September 2001, nearly 17 years after their last performance together, all six Jackson brothers reunited for two performances at Madison Square Garden for a 30th anniversary special commemorating Michael's solo career, which aired in November. In early 2009, the four elder brothers began filming a reality show to make their attempt on reuniting the band, later debuting in December 2009 as The Jacksons: A Family Dynasty. During the middle of the project, Michael had announced his concert comeback in London was scheduled on July 13, 2009. Michael died that same year on June 25, putting efforts on hold.

In April 2012, Jackie, Tito, Jermaine, and Marlon announced their Unity Tour with 38 show dates; although eleven U.S. shows were cancelled. The tour started at Casino Rama in Orillia, Ontario, Canada on June 20, 2012. 32 additional dates were eventually added, and the tour ended on July 27, 2013, in Atlantic City, United States. In 2020, Jermaine left for the final time. On September 15, 2024, Tito died from a fatal heart attack in Gallup, New Mexico. The 2026 biographical film Michael is about Michael (portrayed by Jaafar Jackson, his nephew) and his initial fame with his brothers up until his Bad World Tour in 1988.

== Official members ==
=== Current members ===
Image	Name	Years active	Instruments	Release contributions
	Jackie Jackson	1964–1989; 2001; 2012–present	lead vocals; percussion	all Jackson 5 and Jacksons releases
	Marlon Jackson	1965–1985; 2001; 2012–present	vocals; percussion; synthesizers, programming (1983-1984)	all Jackson 5 and Jacksons releases

=== Former members ===
Image	Name	Years active	Instruments	Release contributions
	Tito Jackson	1964–1989; 2001; 2012–2024 (his death)	vocals; guitar; synthesizer; proggramming (1983-1984)	all releases
	Jermaine Jackson	1964–1975; 1983–1989; 2001; 2012–2020	lead vocals; bass; guitar; percussion (1989)	all Jackson 5 releases, including Victory (1984) and 2300 Jackson Street (1989)
	Michael Jackson	1965–1984; 2001 (died 2009)	lead vocals; percussion; programming (1983-1984)	all releases
	Randy Jackson	1975–1989; 2001; (occasional appearances 1971–1975)	keyboards; piano; percussion; vocals; bass; marimba; programmimg (1983-1984)	all Jacksons releases

== Touring musicians ==
Image	Name	Years active	Instruments	Release contributions
	Reynaud Jones	1964–1965	keyboards	none
	Milford Hite	1964–1967	drums	none
	Johnny Jackson	1967–1975 (died 2006)	drums	live shows
	Ronnie Rancifer	1965–1975	keyboards	live shows
	Jonathan "Sugarfoot" Moffett	1979–1984; 2001	drums	The Jacksons Live! (1981); Victory (1984); The Jacksons LP (1989); The CBS Collection (5xCD) (1989); 2300 Jackson Street (1989); Victory/Triumph (Reissue; 2001); The Essential Jacksons (2004); Original Album Classics (2008)
	Taryll Jackson	2023–2024	vocals	live shows

== Line-ups ==
Period	Members	Releases
1964 – 1965 (As The Jackson Brothers)	Jackie Jackson – vocals; Tito Jackson – guitar, vocals; Jermaine Jackson – bass guitar, vocals	none
1965 – March 1976 (As The Jackson 5)	Jackie Jackson – lead vocals, percussion; Marlon Jackson – vocals, percussion; Michael Jackson – lead vocals, percussion; Tito Jackson – vocals, lead guitar; Jermaine Jackson – lead vocals, bass guitar	Diana Ross Presents The Jackson 5 (1969); ABC (1970); Third Album (1970); Christmas Album (1970); Maybe Tomorrow (1971); Goin' Back to Indiana (1971); Greatest Hits (1971); Lookin' Through the Windows (1972); Skywriter (1973); G.I.T.: Get It Together (1973); The Jackson 5 in Japan (1973); Dancing Machine (1974); Moving Violation (1975); Anthology (1976); Joyful Jukebox Music (1976); Boogie (1979); 18 Greatest Hits (1983); Children of the Light (1993); Soulsation! (1995); Jackson 5: The Ultimate Collection (1995); The Very Best of Michael Jackson with The Jackson Five (1995); The Best of Michael Jackson and The Jackson 5ive – The Motown Years (1997); 20th Century Masters – The Millennium Collection: The Best of The Jackson 5 (1999); Gold (2005); The Motown Years (2008); I Want You Back! Unreleased Masters (2008); J Is for Jackson 5 (2010); Live at the Forum (2010); Come and Get It: The Rare Pearls (2012)
March 1976 – August 1983 (As The Jacksons)	Jackie Jackson – lead vocals, percussion; Marlon Jackson – vocals, percussion; Michael Jackson – lead vocals, percussion; Tito Jackson – vocals, lead guitar; Randy Jackson – keyboards, bass guitar, percussion, vocals	The Jacksons (1976); Goin' Places (1977); Destiny (1978); Triumph (1980); The Jacksons Live! (1981); The Essential Jacksons (2004); The Very Best of The Jacksons (2004); The Jacksons Story (2004, re-released 2007); Can You Feel It – The Jacksons Collection (2009)
August 1983 – December 1984 (As The Jacksons)	Jackie Jackson – lead vocals, percussion; Marlon Jackson – vocals, percussion; Michael Jackson – lead vocals, percussion; Tito Jackson – vocals, lead guitar, synthesizer; Jermaine Jackson – lead vocals, bass guitar; Randy Jackson – keyboards, percussion, vocals	Victory (1984)
January 1985 – June 1989 (As The Jacksons)	Jackie Jackson – lead vocals, percussion; Tito Jackson – vocals, lead guitar, synthesizer; Jermaine Jackson – lead vocals, bass guitar; Randy Jackson – keyboards, percussion, vocals	2300 Jackson Street (1989)
Band inactive June 1989 – September 2001
September 2001 (As The Jacksons)	Jackie Jackson – lead vocals; Marlon Jackson – vocals; Michael Jackson – lead vocals; Tito Jackson – vocals, guitar; Jermaine Jackson – lead vocals, bass guitar; Randy Jackson – keyboards, vocals	none – two concert shows
Band inactive September 2001 – June 2012
June 2012 – 2020	Jackie Jackson – lead vocals, percussion; Marlon Jackson – vocals, percussion; Tito Jackson – vocals, lead guitar; Jermaine Jackson – lead vocals, bass guitar	none – Unity Tour and live shows only
2020 – September 2024	Jackie Jackson – lead vocals, percussion; Marlon Jackson – vocals, percussion; Tito Jackson – vocals, lead guitar	none – live shows only
September 2024 – present	Jackie Jackson – lead vocals, percussion; Marlon Jackson – vocals, percussion	none – live shows only
