= The Jackson 5 discography =

Recordings by American family pop band

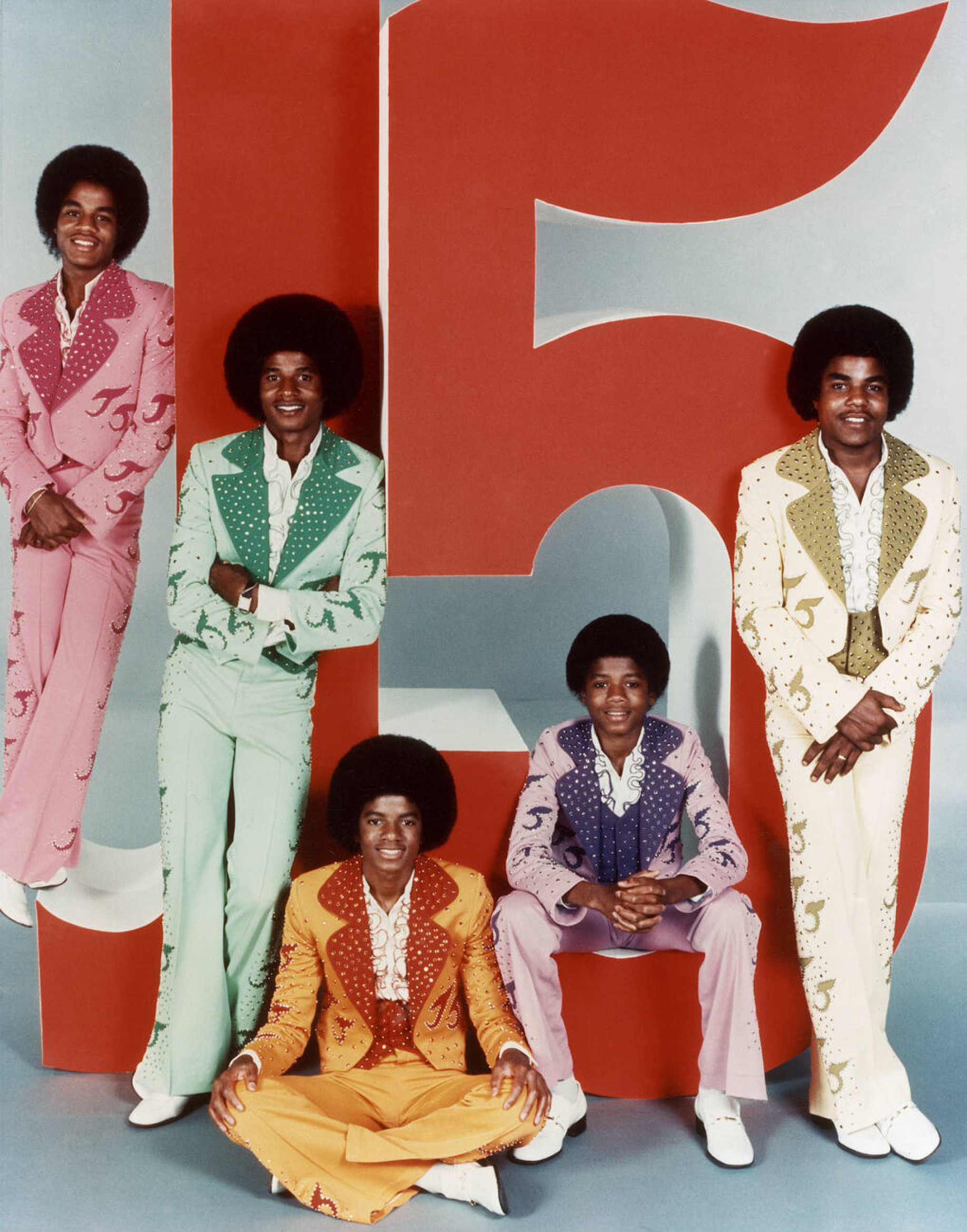
- The Jackson 5 in 1976
- Studio albums: 16
- Soundtrack albums: 2
- Live albums: 3
- Compilation albums: 15
- Singles: 40
- Music videos: 14

This article presents the discography of the Jackson 5 (currently known as the Jacksons), an American family band from Gary, Indiana.

Founding group members Jackie, Tito, Jermaine, Marlon and Michael formed the group after performing in an early incarnation called the Jackson Brothers, which originally consisted of a trio of the three older brothers. In 1975, the youngest brother Randy Jackson replaced Jermaine when the brothers signed with Epic Records and Jermaine stayed with Motown Records. In 1983, Jermaine returned to the group, but by 1989, Marlon and Michael had already left to focus on their solo careers.

Between 1969 and 2024, the group charted 32 singles on the Billboard Hot 100, taking 24 of those singles inside the top forty, with 18 of the singles reaching the top 20, 11 peaking inside the top ten, 8 peaking inside the top 5 and four topping the chart. To this day, they remain the only group in music history to have their first four singles top the Billboard Hot 100.

== Albums ==
=== Studio albums ===
==== As the Jackson 5 ====
Title	Album details	Peak chart positions							Certifications (sales thresholds)
Title	Album details	US	AUS	CAN	NL	NOR	SWE	UK	Certifications (sales thresholds)
Diana Ross Presents The Jackson 5	Released: December 8, 1969; Label: Motown; Format: LP, cassette, 8-track	5	17	10	—	—	—	16	
ABC	Released: May 8, 1970; Label: Motown; Format: LP, cassette, 8-track	4	14	25	—	—	—	22	
Third Album	Released: September 8, 1970; Label: Motown; Format: LP, cassette, 8-track	4	—	9	—	—	—	—	
Jackson 5 Christmas Album	Released: October 15, 1970; Label: Motown; Format: LP, cassette, 8-track	28	—	45	57	40	30	—	
Maybe Tomorrow	Released: April 12, 1971; Label: Motown; Format: LP, cassette, 8-track	11	—	16	—	—	—	—	
Lookin' Through the Windows	Released: May 17, 1972; Label: Motown; Format: LP, cassette, 8-track	7	—	16	—	—	—	16	BPI: Silver
Skywriter	Released: March 29, 1973; Label: Motown; Format: LP, cassette, 8-track	44	41	60	—	—	—	—	
G.I.T.: Get It Together	Released: September 12, 1973; Label: Motown; Format: LP, cassette, 8-track	100	—	—	—	—	—	—	
Dancing Machine	Released: September 5, 1974; Label: Motown; Format: LP, cassette, 8-track	16	—	12	—	—	—	—	
Moving Violation	Released: May 15, 1975; Label: Motown; Format: LP, cassette, 8-track	36	—	—	—	—	—	—	
"—" denotes releases that did not chart

==== As the Jacksons ====
Title	Album details	Peak chart positions								Certifications (sales thresholds)
Title	Album details	US	AUS	CAN	NL	NOR	NZ	SWE	UK	Certifications (sales thresholds)
The Jacksons	Released: November 5, 1976; Label: Epic; Format: LP, cassette, 8-track	36	—	4	—	—	—	—	53	RIAA: Gold
Goin' Places	Released: October 18, 1977; Label: Epic; Format: LP, cassette, 8-track	63	—	—	—	—	—	—	45	
Destiny	Released: November 1978; Label: Epic, CBS; Format: LP, cassette, 8-track	11	5	3	7	—	37	—	33	RIAA: Platinum; ARIA: Platinum
Triumph	Released: September 26, 1980; Label: Epic, CBS; Format: LP, cassette, 8-track	10	3	7	25	—	8	46	13	RIAA: Platinum; ARIA: Platinum; BPI: Gold
Victory	Released: July 2, 1984; Label: Epic, CBS; Format: LP, cassette, CD	4	2	1	2	6	19	7	3	RIAA: 2× Platinum; ARIA: Gold; BPI: Gold; NVPI: Gold
2300 Jackson Street	Released: May 23, 1989; Label: Epic, CBS; Format: LP, cassette, CD	59	81	78	23	—	—	23	39	
"—" denotes releases that did not chart

=== Live albums ===
As the Jackson 5

Title	Album details	Peak chart positions			Certifications (sales thresholds)
Title	Album details	US	AUS	NL	Certifications (sales thresholds)
The Jackson 5 in Japan	Released: October 31, 1973 (Japan only); Recorded: April 30, 1973 at Kōsei Nenkin Hall, Osaka, Japan; Label: Motown; Format: LP, cassette, 8-track	—	—	—	
Live at the Forum	Released: June 21, 2010; Recorded: June 20, 1970 and August 26, 1972, at The Forum, Inglewood, California; Label: Motown, Hip-O	—	—	—	

As the Jacksons

Title	Album details	Peak chart positions			Certifications (sales thresholds)
Title	Album details	US	AUS	NL	Certifications (sales thresholds)
The Jacksons Live!	Released: November 11, 1981; Recorded during Triumph Tour (July 8 – September 26, 1981); Label: Epic, CBS	30	2	43	RIAA: Gold
"—" denotes releases that did not chart

=== Selected compilation albums ===
As The Jackson 5

Title	Album details	Peak chart positions								Sales	Certifications (sales thresholds)
Title	Album details	US	AUS	CAN	NL	NOR	NZ	SWE	UK	Sales	Certifications (sales thresholds)
Greatest Hits	Released: December 27, 1971; Label: Motown	12	—	40	—	—	—	—	23		BPI: Silver
Anthology	Released: June 15, 1976; Label: Motown	84	—	—	—	—	—	—	—		BPI: Silver
Joyful Jukebox Music	Released: October 26, 1976; Label: Motown	—	—	—	—	—	—	—	—		
Boogie	Released: January 16, 1979; Label: Motown	—	—	—	—	—	—	—	—		
18 Greatest Hits	Released: June 1983; Label: Motown	—	—	—	—	—	—	—	1		BPI: Platinum
Children of the Light	Released: May 1993; Label: Spectrum Music	—	—	—	—	—	—	—	—		
Soulsation!	Released: June 27, 1995; Label: Motown	—	—	—	—	—	—	—	—		
Jackson 5: The Ultimate Collection	Released: August 15, 1995; Label: Motown	—	—	—	—	—	—	—	—		BPI: Gold
The Very Best of Michael Jackson with The Jackson Five	Released: 1995; Label: Motown	—	41	—	—	—	—	—	15		BPI: Platinum; RMNZ: Platinum
The Best of Michael Jackson and The Jackson 5ive – The Motown Years	Released: 1997; Label: Motown	—	—	—	—	—	—	—	5		BPI: Gold
20th Century Masters – The Millennium Collection: The Best of The Jackson 5	Released: October 7, 1999; Label: Motown	114	—	50	—	—	—	—	—	US: 1,063,000	RIAA: Gold
Gold	Released: March 1, 2005; Label: Motown	—	99	—	—	—	—	—	—		
The Motown Years	Released: September 9, 2008; Label: Motown	—	14	—	4	1	12	33	4		ARIA: Gold; BPI: Gold
I Want You Back! Unreleased Masters	Released: November 10, 2009; Label: Motown	— (Note: I Want You Back! Unreleased Masters did not enter the US Billboard 200 albums chart, but peaked at number 50 on the Billboard Top R&B/Hip-Hop Albums chart.)	—	—	—	—	—	—	—		
J Is for Jackson 5	Released: March 30, 2010; Label: Motown	—	—	—	—	—	—	—	—		
Come and Get It: The Rare Pearls	Released: September 18, 2012; Label: Motown, Hip-O	—	—	—	—	—	—	—	-	had a limited U.S. physical run of 4,000 copies	

As the Jacksons

Title	Album details	Peak chart positions								Sales	Certifications (sales thresholds)
Title	Album details	US	AUS	CAN	NL	NOR	NZ	SWE	UK	Sales	Certifications (sales thresholds)
The Essential Jacksons	Released: March 9, 2004; Label: Epic, CBS	— (Note: The Essential Jacksons did not enter the Billboard 200, but peaked at number 99 on the Billboard Top R&B/Hip-Hop Albums chart.)	78	—	—	—	—	—	—		
The Very Best of The Jacksons	Released: July 5, 2004; Label: Epic, CBS	— (Note: The Very Best of The Jacksons did not enter the Billboard 200, but the 2009 Playlist version of the album peaked at number 35 on the Billboard Top R&B/Hip-Hop Albums chart.)	15	—	39	—	4	—	7		BPI: Gold
The Jacksons Story	Released: July 20, 2004; Label: Hip-O	— (Note: The Jacksons Story did not enter the Billboard 200, but peaked at number 74 on the Billboard Top R&B/Hip-Hop Albums chart.)	—	—	—	—	—	—	—		
Can You Feel It – The Jacksons Collection	Released: 2009; Label: Camden, Sony	—	66	—	—	—	—	—	—		
"—" denotes releases that did not chart

=== Soundtrack albums ===
As the Jackson 5

Title	Album details	Peak chart positions			
Title	Album details	US	AUS	CAN	NZ
Goin' Back to Indiana	Released: September 29, 1971; Label: Motown	16	—	24	—
The Jacksons: An American Dream	Released: October 20, 1992; Label: Motown; Format: CD	—	16	—	12
Michael: The Birth of a Superstar	Released: April 3, 2026; Label: Universal Music Group; Format: Streaming release	—	—	—	—
"—" denotes releases that did not chart

== Singles ==
=== As the Jackson 5 ===
Single	Year	Peak chart positions						Certifications	Album
Single	Year	US	US R&B	CAN	AUS	IRE	UK	Certifications	Album
"Big Boy"	1968	—	—	—	—	—	—		Non-album singles
"We Don't Have to Be Over 21 (To Fall in Love)"	1968	—	—	—	—	—	—		Non-album singles
"I Want You Back"	1969	1	1	2	77	6	2	RIAA: Platinum; BPI: 4× Platinum; RMNZ: 4× Platinum	Diana Ross Presents The Jackson 5
"ABC"	1970	1	1	3	14	—	8	BPI: Platinum	ABC
"The Love You Save"	1970	1	1	8	59	—	7		ABC
"I'll Be There"	1970	1	1	10	31	14	4	BPI: Gold; RMNZ: Gold	Third Album
"Mama's Pearl"	1970	2	2	3	—	—	25		Third Album
"Santa Claus Is Comin' to Town"	1970	30	—	76	27	—	30	ARIA: Platinum; BPI: Platinum; RMNZ: Platinum	Jackson 5 Christmas Album
"I Saw Mommy Kissing Santa Claus"	1970	43	—	—	—	—	84	BPI: Silver; RMNZ: Gold	Jackson 5 Christmas Album
"Never Can Say Goodbye"	1971	2	1	14	77	—	33		Maybe Tomorrow
"Maybe Tomorrow"	1971	20	3	22	—	—	—		Maybe Tomorrow
"Sugar Daddy"	1971	10	3	11	—	—	—		Greatest Hits
"Little Bitty Pretty One"	1972	13	8	24	47	—	—		Lookin' Through the Windows
"Lookin' Through the Windows"	1972	16	5	69	—	—	9		Lookin' Through the Windows
"Doctor, My Eyes"	1972	—	—	—	—	—	9		Lookin' Through the Windows
"Corner of the Sky"	1972	18	9	35	—	—	—		Skywriter
"Hallelujah Day"	1973	28	10	—	31	—	20		Skywriter
"Skywriter"	1973	—	—	—	87	—	25		Skywriter
"Get It Together"	1973	28	2	88	—	—	—		G.I.T.: Get It Together
"Dancing Machine"	1974	2	1	2	—	—	—		Dancing Machine
"Whatever You Got, I Want"	1974	38	3	25	—	—	—		Dancing Machine
"I Am Love"	1974	15	3	45	—	—	—		Dancing Machine
"The Boogie Man"	1974	—	—	—	—	—	—		Skywriter
"Forever Came Today"	1975	60	6	79	—	—	—		Moving Violation
"All I Do Is Think of You"	1975	—	50	—	—	—	—		Moving Violation
"Who's Lovin' You" (Original Single Version)	1992	—	—	96	—	—	36	BPI: Gold; RMNZ: Gold	The Jacksons: An American Dream
"—" denotes releases that did not chart

=== As the Jacksons ===
Single	Year	Peak chart positions						Certifications	Album
Single	Year	US	US R&B	CAN	AUS	IRE	UK	Certifications	Album
"Enjoy Yourself"	1976	6	2	5	—	—	42	RIAA: Platinum	The Jacksons
"Show You the Way to Go"	1977	28	6	52	—	5	1	BPI: Silver	The Jacksons
"Dreamer"	1977	—	—	—	—	—	22		The Jacksons
"Keep On Dancing"	1977	—	—	—	—	—	—		The Jacksons
"Goin' Places"	1977	52	8	62	—	13	26		Goin' Places
"Find Me a Girl"	1977	—	38	—	—	—	—		Goin' Places
"Even Though You're Gone"	1978	—	—	—	—	—	31		Goin' Places
"Music's Takin' Over"	1978	—	—	—	—	—	—		Goin' Places
"Blame It on the Boogie"	1978	54	3	—	4	15	8	BPI: Platinum	Destiny
"Shake Your Body (Down to the Ground)"	1979	7	3	13	59	9	4	RIAA: Platinum; BPI: Silver	Destiny
"Destiny"	1979	—	—	—	—	—	39		Destiny
"Lovely One"	1980	12	2	40	—	17	29		Triumph
"Heartbreak Hotel"	1980	22	2	—	—	—	44		Triumph
"Can You Feel It"	1981	77	30	—	10	12	6	BPI: Silver	Triumph
"Walk Right Now"	1981	73	50	—	—	16	7		Triumph
"Time Waits for No One"	1981	—	—	—	—	—	—		Triumph
"Things I Do for You" (Live)	1981	—	—	—	—	—	—		Live!
"Working Day and Night" (Live)	1981	—	—	—	—	—	—		Live!
"State of Shock" (with Mick Jagger)	1984	3	4	8	10	8	14	RIAA: Gold	Victory
"Torture"	1984	17	12	12	32	13	26		Victory
"Body"	1984	47	39	—	—	—	94		Victory
"Wait"	1985	—	—	—	—	—	—		Victory
"Time Out for the Burglar"	1987	—	88	—	—	—	—		Burglar: Original Motion Picture Soundtrack
"Nothin' (That Compares 2 U)"	1989	77	4	—	89	—	33		2300 Jackson Street
"2300 Jackson Street"	1989	—	9	—	—	—	76		2300 Jackson Street
"Art of Madness"	1989	—	—	—	—	—	—		2300 Jackson Street
"—" denotes releases that did not chart

=== As a collaborating artist ===
Single	Year	Peak chart positions		Album
Single	Year	JPN	JPN Hot 100	Album
"Letter in the Sky" (Ai featuring The Jacksons)	2011	14	36	Independent

== Home video ==
The Jackson 5

Year	Title	Format	Notes
1981	In Concert	VHS	Live concert at Auditorio Nacional, Mexico City, December 1975 (The Jackson 5 World Tour)
2013	The Jackson 5ive	DVD, Blu-ray	All 23 episodes of animated TV show (1971–1972)

The Jacksons

Year	Title	Format	Notes
1979	Live	VHS	Live concert at Finsbury Park Astoria, London, February 23, 1979 (Destiny World Tour)

== Music videos ==
The Jackson 5

Year	Title
2019	"I Saw Mommy Kissing Santa Claus" (animated video)

"Santa Claus Is Coming to Town" (animated video)

The Jacksons

Year	Title
1977	"Enjoy Yourself"
1977	"Goin' Places"
1977	"Even Though You're Gone"
1978	"Blame It on the Boogie"
1981	"Can You Feel It"
1984	"Torture"
1984	"Body"
1989	"Nothin' (That Compares 2 U)"
1989	"2300 Jackson Street"
1989	"Art of Madness"
2011	"Letter in the Sky" (Ai featuring The Jacksons)
2021	"Can You Feel It" (Kirk Franklin Remix) (featuring Tamela Mann)
2021	"Can You Feel It" (Jacksons x MLK Remix)
