= The Very Best of The Jacksons =

Greatest hits album by the Jacksons
- Released: July 5, 2004
- Recorded: 1969–1989
- Length: 51:52 (CD1); 66:55 (CD2)
- Labels: Epic; Universal Music

The Jacksons chronology
The Essential Jacksons (2004)	The Very Best of The Jacksons (2004)	The Jacksons Story (2004)

The Very Best of The Jacksons (released in Japan under The Very Best of The Jackson 5/The Jacksons: Anthology 1969–1987) is a greatest hits compilation by the Jacksons during their years at Motown as the Jackson 5 to their last single released by Epic Records in 1989. The compilation is a joint release with Universal Music Group, Motown's current parent, and was distributed on July 5, 2004, in the United Kingdom and December 22, 2004, in Japan by Sony Music. Featured are most of the hit singles by the group, including their first hit in 1969 "I Want You Back" as well as popular hits such as "ABC", "This Place Hotel" and "Shake Your Body (Down to the Ground)". The compilation also includes songs Michael Jackson released during his solo career at Motown as well as a live recording of his first smash hit at Epic, "Don't Stop 'Til You Get Enough".

The cover art is similar to Number Ones, a similar album consisting of lead singer Michael Jackson's solo career from 1979 to 2003.

== Track listing ==
Disc 1
No.	Title	Writer(s)	First appeared on	Length
1.	"I Want You Back"	The Corporation (Berry Gordy, Freddie Perren, Deke Richards, Alphonzo Mizell)	Diana Ross Presents The Jackson 5 (1969)	2:58
2.	"ABC"	The Corporation	ABC (1970)	2:57
3.	"The Love You Save"	The Corporation	ABC	3:00
4.	"I'll Be There"	Berry Gordy, Bob West, Willie Hutch, Hal Davis	Third Album (1970)	3:58
5.	"Mama's Pearl"	The Corporation	Third Album	3:12
6.	"Never Can Say Goodbye"	Clifton Davis	Maybe Tomorrow (1971)	2:58
7.	"Sugar Daddy"	The Corporation	Greatest Hits (1971)	2:34
8.	"Dancing Machine" (single version)	Hal Davis, Don Fletcher, Dean Parks	G.I.T.: Get It Together (1973)	2:43
9.	"Lookin' Through the Windows"	Clifton Davis	Lookin' Through the Windows (1972)	3:37
10.	"Doctor My Eyes"	Jackson Browne	Lookin' Through the Windows	3:10
11.	"Ain't No Sunshine" (Michael Jackson)	Bill Withers	Got to Be There (1972)	4:11
12.	"Got to Be There" (Michael Jackson)	Elliot Willensky	Got to Be There	3:22
13.	"Rockin' Robin" (Michael Jackson)	Leon René	Got to Be There	2:31
14.	"Ben" (Michael Jackson)	Don Black, Walter Scharf	Ben (1972)	2:44
15.	"One Day in Your Life" (Michael Jackson)	Sam Brown III, Renée Armand	Forever, Michael (1975)	4:17
16.	"Farewell My Summer Love" (Michael Jackson)	Keni St. Lewis	Farewell My Summer Love (1984)	3:44

Disc 2
No.	Title	Writer(s)	First appeared on	Length
1.	"Can You Feel It" (single version)	Michael Jackson, Jackie Jackson	Triumph (1980)	3:52
2.	"Blame It on the Boogie"	Mick Jackson, Dave Jackson, Elmar Krohn	Destiny (1978)	3:33
3.	"Enjoy Yourself" (7" extended version)	Kenneth Gamble, Leon Huff	The Jacksons (1976)	3:41
4.	"Show You the Way to Go" (single version)	Kenneth Gamble, Leon Huff	The Jacksons	3:29
5.	"Dreamer"	Kenneth Gamble, Leon Huff	The Jacksons	3:06
6.	"Even Though You're Gone"	Kenneth Gamble, Leon Huff	Goin' Places (1977)	4:32
7.	"Goin' Places"	Kenneth Gamble, Leon Huff	Goin' Places	4:30
8.	"Torture" (single version)	Jackie Jackson, Kathy Wakefield	Victory (1984)	4:31
9.	"Shake Your Body (Down to the Ground)" (single version)	Michael Jackson, Randy Jackson	Destiny	3:47
10.	"Lovely One"	Michael Jackson, Randy Jackson	Triumph	4:52
11.	"This Place Hotel" (single version)	Michael Jackson	Triumph	4:49
12.	"Walk Right Now" (single version)	Michael Jackson, Randy Jackson, Jackie Jackson	Triumph	3:33
13.	"State of Shock" (featuring Mick Jagger)	Michael Jackson, Randy Hansen	Victory	4:30
14.	"2300 Jackson Street"	Jermaine Jackson, Jackie Jackson, Tito Jackson, Randy Jackson, Gene Griffin	2300 Jackson Street (1989)	5:06
15.	"Nothin' (That Compares 2 U)" (7" edited version)	L.A. Reid, Babyface	2300 Jackson Street	4:14
16.	"Don't Stop 'Til You Get Enough" (1981 live version)	Michael Jackson	The Jacksons Live! (1981)	4:45

=== 2009 Playlist edition ===
2009 Playlist edition track listing
No.	Title	Writer(s)	Length
1.	"Music's Takin' Over"	John Whitehead, Gene McFadden, Victor Carstarphen	4:26
2.	"Goin' Places"	Kenneth Gamble, Leon Huff	4:30
3.	"Enjoy Yourself"	Kenneth Gamble, Leon Huff	3:41
4.	"Blame It on the Boogie"	Mick Jackson, David Jackson, Elmar Krohn	3:33
5.	"Shake Your Body (Down to the Ground)"	Randy Jackson, Michael Jackson	8:00
6.	"All Night Dancin'"	Randy Jackson, Michael Jackson	6:11
7.	"Things I Do for You"	The Jacksons	4:05
8.	"Lovely One"	Michael Jackson, Randy Jackson	4:52
9.	"State of Shock"	Michael Jackson, Randy Hansen	4:30
10.	"Torture"	Jackie Jackson, Kathy Wakefield	4:53
11.	"Medley: I Want You Back/ABC/The Love You Save" (live)	Berry Gordy, Freddie Perren, Alphonzo Mizell, Deke Richards	2:58
12.	"This Place Hotel"	Michael Jackson	5:44
13.	"2300 Jackson Street"	Jermaine Jackson, Jackie Jackson, Tito Jackson, Randy Jackson, Gene Griffin	5:08
14.	"Man of War"	Kenneth Gamble, Leon Huff	3:13

== Charts ==
=== Weekly charts ===
Weekly chart performance for The Very Best of The Jacksons
Chart (2004)	Peak position
Australian Albums (ARIA)	15
Belgian Albums (Ultratop Wallonia)	87
Dutch Albums (Album Top 100)	39
New Zealand Albums (RMNZ)	4
Scottish Albums (Official Charts)	26
UK Albums (Official Charts)	7

=== Year-end charts ===
Year-end chart performance for The Very Best of The Jacksons
Chart (2004)	Position
UK Albums (OCC)	155

== Certifications ==
Certifications for The Very Best of The Jacksons
Region	Certification	Certified units/sales
New Zealand (RMNZ)	Platinum	15,000^{‡}
United Kingdom (BPI)	Gold	100,000^{^}
^{^} Shipments figures based on certification alone.
