= Unity Tour =

2012–13 concert tour by the Jacksons

- Tour by the Jacksons
- Location: Asia; Australia; Europe; North America
- Start date: June 20, 2012
- End date: July 27, 2013
- Legs: 6
- No. of shows: 70

The Jacksons tour chronology
- Victory Tour (1984); Unity Tour (2012–2013); A Celebration of 50 Years (2017)

The Unity Tour was a concert tour by the Jacksons. The tour marked the first time the brothers have toured as the Jacksons without Michael, who died on June 25, 2009. This was also the first tour without Randy Jackson. The tour began on June 20, 2012, and ended on July 27, 2013. The lineup consisted of the four eldest Jackson brothers: Jackie, Tito, Jermaine and Marlon.

== Set list ==
The following set list was performed throughout the tour.

1. "Can You Feel It"
2. "Blame It on the Boogie"
3. "I Wanna Be Where You Are"
4. "Rock with You"
5. "Show You the Way to Go"
6. "Lovely One"
7. "Lookin' Through the Windows"
8. "Time Waits for No One"
9. "Heaven Knows I Love You, Girl"
10. "Push Me Away"
11. "Man of War"
12. "Gone Too Soon"
13. Medley: "I Want You Back" / "ABC" / "The Love You Save" / "Never Can Say Goodbye" / "All I Do Is Think of You" / "I'll Be There"
14. "Dynamite"
15. "Let's Get Serious"
16. "Do What You Do"
17. "Can't Let Her Get Away"
18. "This Place Hotel"
19. "Wanna Be Startin' Somethin'"
20. "Don't Stop 'Til You Get Enough"
21. "Shake Your Body (Down to the Ground)"

== Tour dates ==
List of 2012 concerts
Date	City	Country	Venue
June 20, 2012	Rama	Canada	Casino Rama Entertainment Centre
June 22, 2012	Merrillville	United States	Star Plaza Theatre
June 23, 2012	Detroit	United States	Fox Theatre
June 28, 2012	New York City	United States	Apollo Theater
June 29, 2012	Atlantic City	United States	Borgata Event Center
June 30, 2012	Englewood	United States	Bergen Performing Arts Center
July 1, 2012	Baltimore	United States	Modell Performing Arts Center
July 8, 2012	Atlanta	United States	Chastain Park Amphitheater
July 17, 2012	Albuquerque	United States	The Pavilion
July 18, 2012	Phoenix	United States	Comerica Theatre
July 20, 2012	North Las Vegas	United States	The Club at Cannery Casino
July 21, 2012	Valley Center	United States	Open Sky Theater
July 22, 2012	Los Angeles	United States	Greek Theatre
July 27, 2012	Saratoga	United States	Mountain Winery Amphitheatre
July 28, 2012	Lincoln City	United States	Chinook Winds Showroom
July 29, 2012	Snoqualmie	United States	Mountain View Plaza
August 11, 2012 (Note: The August 11, 2012, concert was a part of Seaside Summer Concert.)	Brooklyn	United States	Coney Island
August 31, 2012	Cabazon	United States	Morongo Ballroom
October 12, 2012	Richmond	Canada	River Rock Show Theatre
October 19, 2012	Washington, D.C.	United States	Howard Theatre
October 20, 2012	Biloxi	United States	Beau Rivage Theatre
November 8, 2012	Antwerp	Belgium	Sportpaleis
November 9, 2012	Antwerp	Belgium	Sportpaleis
November 10, 2012	Antwerp	Belgium	Sportpaleis
November 16, 2012	Antwerp	Belgium	Sportpaleis
November 17, 2012	Antwerp	Belgium	Sportpaleis
November 23, 2012	Rotterdam	Netherlands	Rotterdam Ahoy
November 24, 2012	Rotterdam	Netherlands	Rotterdam Ahoy
November 25, 2012	Rotterdam	Netherlands	Rotterdam Ahoy
November 26, 2012	Rotterdam	Netherlands	Rotterdam Ahoy
November 27, 2012	Rotterdam	Netherlands	Rotterdam Ahoy
November 30, 2012	Abu Dhabi	United Arab Emirates	du Arena
December 6, 2012	Tokyo	Japan	Tokyo International Forum
December 7, 2012	Tokyo	Japan	Tokyo International Forum
December 9, 2012	Osaka	Japan	OICC Event Hall
December 12, 2012	Seri Kembangan	Malaysia	Palace of the Golden Horses Royal Ballroom
December 13, 2012	Kuala Lumpur	Malaysia	Stadium Negara
December 15, 2012	Singapore		Singapore Indoor Stadium

List of 2013 concerts
Date	City	Country	Venue
February 5, 2013	Dortmund	Germany	Westfalenhallen
February 6, 2013	Frankfurt	Germany	Jahrhunderthalle
February 9, 2013	Vienna	Austria	Wiener Stadthalle
February 11, 2013	Rome	Italy	Atlántico Live
February 12, 2013	Milan	Italy	Discoteca Alcatraz Milano
February 17, 2013	Ulm	Germany	Ratiopharm Arena
February 18, 2013	Berlin	Germany	Tempodrom
February 20, 2013	Copenhagen	Denmark	Falkoner Teatret
February 21, 2013	Oslo	Norway	Oslo Spektrum
February 22, 2013	Stockholm	Sweden	Stockholm Waterfront Congress Centre
February 24, 2013	Helsinki	Finland	Hartwall Areena
February 26, 2013	Birmingham	England	Arena Birmingham
February 27, 2013	Manchester	England	Apollo Manchester
February 28, 2013	Glasgow	Scotland	Clyde Auditorium
March 2, 2013	Bournemouth	England	Pavilion Theatre
March 3, 2013	London	England	Hammersmith Apollo
March 5, 2013	Munich	Germany	Olympiahalle
March 6, 2013	Antwerp	Belgium	Lotto Arena
March 7, 2013	Amsterdam	Netherlands	Heineken Music Hall
March 10, 2013	Düsseldorf	Germany	Mitsubishi Electric Halle
March 14, 2013	Perth	Australia	Perth Arena
March 16, 2013	Sydney	Australia	Sydney Entertainment Centre
March 17, 2013	Wollongong	Australia	WIN Entertainment Centre
March 19, 2013	Melbourne	Australia	The Plenary
March 21, 2013	Newcastle	Australia	Newcastle Civic Theatre
March 24, 2013	Brisbane	Australia	Riverstage
March 26, 2013	Auckland	New Zealand	Vector Arena
May 28, 2013	Rabat	Morocco	OLM Souissi
June 30, 2013	Los Angeles	United States	Staples Center
July 25, 2013	New Brunswick	United States	State Theatre
July 26, 2013	Westbury	United States	NYCB Theatre at Westbury
July 27, 2013	Atlantic City	United States	Borgata Music Box

=== Box office score data ===
Venue	City	Tickets sold / available	Gross revenue
Greek Theatre	Los Angeles	4,511 / 5,774 (78%)	$182,163

=== Cancelled dates ===
List of cancelled concerts with date, city, country, and venue
Date	City	Country	Venue
June 18, 2012	Louisville	United States	The Louisville Palace
June 19, 2012	Cincinnati	United States	Riverbend Music Center
June 24, 2012	Kettering	United States	Fraze Pavilion
June 26, 2012	Cleveland	United States	Jacobs Pavilion at Nautica
July 3, 2012	Washington, D.C.	United States	DAR Constitution Hall
July 6, 2012	Raleigh	United States	Time Warner Cable Music Pavilion
July 7, 2012	Charlotte	United States	Verizon Wireless Amphitheatre
July 10, 2012	Nashville	United States	Ryman Auditorium
July 11, 2012	St. Louis	United States	Fox Theatre
July 13, 2012	Grand Prairie	United States	Verizon Theatre at Grand Prairie
July 14, 2012	Houston	United States	Bayou Music Center

== Personnel ==
=== Performers ===
Musicians

- Jermaine Jackson – vocals
- Tito Jackson – vocals, guitar
- Marlon Jackson – vocals
- Jackie Jackson – vocals
- Tommy Organ – guitar
- Brandon Brown – bass
- Kyle Bolden – guitar
- Rex Salas – keyboards/md
- JP Castillo - Background Vocals
- Knicole Jackson - Background Vocals
- Stacey Lamont Sydnor – percussion
- Chad Wright – drums
- Kenneth KT Townsend – keyboards

Dancers

- La Toya Jackson ("Shake Your Body (Down to the Ground)" only)
