= Triumph Tour =

1981 concert tour by the Jacksons

- Tour by the Jacksons
- Poster to an extra concert in Inglewood, USA
- Location: North America
- Associated album: Triumph; Off the Wall
- Start date: July 8, 1981
- End date: September 26, 1981
- No. of shows: 46
- Supporting act: Stacy Lattisaw
- Box office: US $5.5 million ($19.48 million in 2025 dollars)

The Jacksons tour chronology
- Destiny World Tour (1979–1980); Triumph Tour (1981); Victory Tour (1984)

The Triumph Tour was a concert tour by the Jacksons, covering the United States and Canada from July 8 to September 26, 1981. The tour grossed a total of $5.5 million ($19.5 million in 2025), setting a record breaking four sold out concerts in Inglewood, California.

== History ==
By 1981, the Jacksons had regained success as a platinum-selling recording group with two albums, Destiny (1978) and Triumph (1980). Additionally, lead singer Michael Jackson was in the final stages of promoting his 1979 multi-platinum album, Off the Wall. This tour allowed Michael to bring in new show production ideas more to his liking. Inspired by Earth, Wind & Fire's live shows, Michael created the costumes and designed the stage. He and his brothers also collaborated on an intro that signaled similarities to their "Can You Feel It" music video. As it had been for many years, the choreography was done by Michael, Jackie and Marlon Jackson. The shows included magical elements designed by Doug Henning—for example, Michael disappearing in smoke during "Don't Stop 'Til You Get Enough".

=== Touring tenure ===
The Triumph Tour began in Memphis, Tennessee, and ended with a sold-out week of shows in Inglewood. Each show earned highly positive reviews, in part due to Michael's leadership and showmanship. His brothers also earned praise, particularly for Randy's and Tito's musicality, and Marlon's dance ability. The tour marked the last truly integrated group effort, as Michael's solo career would soon eclipse his success with his brothers. The tour was so well-received and popular that Epic had the brothers record a variety of shows, and compile them for an upcoming live release. The tracks were recorded during stops in Memphis, New York City, Buffalo and Providence. The live album, The Jacksons Live!, came out in late 1981, and went gold in its initial run and has sold over two million copies worldwide.

After the tour ended, Michael went back to record Thriller, his follow-up to Off the Wall (1979). It would be three years before the Jacksons would go back on the road again. Rolling Stone later named the Triumph Tour one of the best 25 tours between 1967 and 1987. To showcase the success of the Triumph Tour, Michael Jackson commented that it was their first show without any marginal material.

=== Stage ===
The stage was dark and had three groups of strobe lights, all of them containing different colors of lights, facing the stage diagonally. The stage also had a spotlight that followed the main performers. In addition to the lighting, the musicians played their instruments on fixtures (the horn section to the left of the stage, the drums to the center, and keyboards to the right; with the exception of the guitarists and Randy Jackson who played the piano, keyboards, and different percussions).

== Opening act ==
- Stacy Lattisaw

== Setlist ==
The following set list was performed during the tour.

1. "Can You Feel It'"
2. "Things I Do for You"
3. "Off the Wall"
4. "Ben"
5. "Walk Right Now" (removed after Lakeland - July 28, probably)
6. "This Place Hotel"
7. "She's Out of My Life"
8. "Movie and Rap, Including Excerpts of: I Want You Back / Never Can Say Goodbye / Got to Be There"
9. "I Want You Back" / "ABC" / "The Love You Save"
10. "I'll Be There"
11. "Rock with You"
12. "Lovely One"
13. "Workin' Day and Night"
  Encore
14. "Don't Stop' Til You Get Enough"
15. "Shake Your Body (Down to the Ground)"

== Tour dates ==
The tour dates are adapted from both The Jacksons: Legacy and Michael Jackson FAQ: All That's Left to Know About the King of Pop, although there are sources that state that some shows took place on different days. (Note: Conflicting newspaper sources: Baton Rouge, July 9; Richmond, July 26; Mobile, July 27; Hampton, July 31; Landover, August 1; Atlanta, August 12; Providence, August 21; Buffalo, August 23; Milwaukee, August 26; Indianapolis, August 28; Detroit, August 29; Detroit, September 4; Milwaukee, September 6; Kansas City, September 8 (Cancelation); Denver, September 10; Daly City, September 13; San Diego, September 17 (Cancelation))

List of 1981 tour dates, showing date, city, country and venue
Date (1981)	City	Country	Venue
July 8	Memphis	United States	Mid-South Coliseum
July 10	Oklahoma City	United States	Myriad Convention Center
July 11	Dallas	United States	Reunion Arena
July 12	Houston	United States	The Summit
July 15	San Antonio	United States	HemisFair Arena
July 17	Baton Rouge	United States	Riverside Centroplex Arena
July 18	Mobile	United States	Mobile Municipal Auditorium
July 22	Atlanta	United States	Omni Coliseum
July 24	Greensboro	United States	Greensboro Coliseum
July 25	Charlotte	United States	Charlotte Coliseum
July 26	Hampton	United States	Hampton Coliseum
July 28	Lakeland	United States	Lakeland Civic Center
July 31	Landover	United States	Capital Centre
August 1	Landover	United States	Capital Centre
August 2	Buffalo	United States	Buffalo Memorial Auditorium
August 4	Montreal	Canada	Montreal Forum
August 5	Toronto	Canada	Maple Leaf Gardens
August 7	Uniondale	United States	Nassau Veterans Memorial Coliseum
August 8	Cincinnati	United States	Riverfront Coliseum
August 9	Richfield	United States	Richfield Coliseum
August 13	Pittsburgh	United States	Civic Arena
August 14	Philadelphia	United States	Spectrum
August 15	Hartford	United States	Hartford Civic Center
August 16	Providence	United States	Providence Civic Center
August 18	New York City	United States	Madison Square Garden
August 19	New York City	United States	Madison Square Garden
August 21	Detroit	United States	Joe Louis Arena
August 22	Indianapolis	United States	Market Square Arena
August 23	Trotwood	United States	Hara Arena
August 26	Milwaukee	United States	MECCA Arena
August 28	Chicago	United States	Chicago Stadium
August 29	Lexington	United States	Rupp Arena
August 31	Nashville	United States	Nashville Municipal Auditorium
September 1	Kansas City	United States	Kemper Arena
September 2	St. Louis	United States	Checkerdome
September 3	Denver	United States	McNichols Sports Arena
September 5	Chicago	United States	Chicago Stadium
September 6	Winchester	United States	Las Vegas Convention Center
September 8	San Diego	United States	San Diego Sports Arena
September 10	Daly City	United States	Cow Palace
September 15	Tempe	United States	ASU Activity Center
September 18	Inglewood	United States	The Forum
September 19	Inglewood	United States	The Forum
September 22	Oakland	United States	Oakland–Alameda County Coliseum Arena
September 25	Inglewood	United States	The Forum
September 26	Inglewood	United States	The Forum

== Box office score data ==
Venue	City	Tickets sold / available	Gross revenue
Mid-South Coliseum	Memphis	11,999 / 11,999	$118,528
Reunion Arena	Dallas	15,602 / 15,602	$153,252
Lakeland Civic Center	Lakeland	10,000 / 10,000	$107,000
Buffalo Memorial Auditorium	Buffalo	11,000 / 11,000	$115,000
Riverfront Coliseum	Cincinnati	15,898 / 15,898	$166,038
Omni Coliseum	Atlanta	15,667 / 15,667	$163,773
Spectrum	Philadelphia	17,842 / 17,842	$224,881
Hartford Civic Center	Hartford	11,153 / 11,153	$121,490
Providence Civic Center	Providence	13,000 / 13,000	$146,000
ASU Activity Center	Tempe	7,230 / 14,000	$75,915
The Forum	Inglewood	55,000 / 55,000	$633,029
Oakland–Alameda County Coliseum Arena	Oakland	12,435 / 14,000	$149,633
Total		196,826 / 205,161 (95%)	$2,174,539

== Personnel ==
The Jacksons

- Michael Jackson – vocals
- Jackie Jackson – vocals, percussion
- Tito Jackson – guitar, vocals
- Marlon Jackson – vocals, percussion
- Randy Jackson – vocals, congas, piano, keyboards

Band

- David Williams – guitar
- Bill Wolfer – synthesizer
- Mike McKinney – bass
- Jonathan Moffett – drums
- Wesley Phillips, Cloris Grimes, Alan (Funt) Prater, Roderick (Mac) McMorris – horns (East Coast Horns)
