= The Jacksons Live! =

Live

Live album by the Jacksons
- Released: November 11, 1981
- Recorded: July 8, 1981 at Mid-South Coliseum; July 22, 1981 at Omni Coliseum (Atlanta); August 13, 1981 at Civic Arena (Pittsburgh); August 16, 1981 at Providence Civic Center (Providence); August 18, 1981 at Madison Square Garden (New York City)
- Length: 66:33
- Labels: Epic; CBS
- Producer: The Jacksons

The Jacksons chronology
Triumph (1980)	Live (1981)	18 Greatest Hits (1983)

Singles from The Jacksons Live!
- 1. "Things I Do for You" Released: November 1981 (UK); 2. "Off the Wall" Released: 1981 (Japan); 3. "Workin' Day and Night" Released: February 1982 (US)

The Jacksons Live! (also known as simply Live) is a live album by the Jacksons. It was released on November 11, 1981, by Epic Records. The album was recorded during the band's North American concert tour in fall 1981, known as the Triumph Tour. The live double album was culled from recordings made on the tour's stops in Buffalo, Providence, Atlanta, and New York City. The live album sold over two million copies worldwide.

The 1981 live show setlist featured songs from the group's 1980 album Triumph, two songs from Destiny (1978), a medley of their Motown hits, and five songs from lead singer Michael's 1979 solo album Off the Wall.

The Triumph Tour would be the group's last tour together for three years, while Michael recorded and released the phenomenally successful Thriller (1982) album and its singles in 1982 and 1983. The group would reunite for their final tour (sans an injured Jackie Jackson, who only participated in the second and final last leg of the tour after recovering from a knee injury)—Victory Tour—in 1984. In 1988, Rolling Stone magazine described the Triumph Tour as one of the best 25 tours between 1967 and 1987.

== Critical reception ==
Professional ratings
Review scores
Source	Rating
AllMusic	3.5/5 stars
The Rolling Stone Album Guide	3.5/5 stars
Uncut	3/5 stars

Bruce Eder, of AllMusic, wrote that the album "is a reminder of how great an act they [the Jacksons] were, and captures what was just about the end of Michael Jackson's work with the family group, all of it very much on a high-note. The album is worth tracking down as an artifact of a simpler, more unabashedly joyous time in music, as well as the family's history."

== Track listing ==
The Jacksons Live! track listing
No.	Title	Writer(s)	Length
1.	"Opening / Can You Feel It"	Michael Jackson; Jackie Jackson	6:04
2.	"Things I Do for You"	Michael Jackson; Jackie Jackson; Randy Jackson; Tito Jackson	3:38
3.	"Off the Wall"	Rod Temperton	4:00
4.	"Ben"	Walter Scharf; Don Black	3:52
5.	"Heartbreak Hotel"	Michael Jackson	4:40
6.	"She's Out of My Life"	Tom Bahler	4:48
7.	"Movie and Rap, Including Excerpts of: I Want You Back / Never Can Say Goodbye / Got to Be There"	Berry Gordy; Freddie Perren; Alphonzo Mizell; Deke Richards; Clifton Davis; Elliot Willensky	3:04
8.	"Medley: I Want You Back / ABC / The Love You Save"	Gordy; Freddie Perren; Alphonzo Mizell; Deke Richards	2:55
9.	"I'll Be There"	Gordy; West; Willie Hutch; Hal Davis	3:12
10.	"Rock with You"	Temperton	3:59
11.	"Lovely One"	Michael Jackson; Randy Jackson	6:28
12.	"Workin' Day and Night"	Michael Jackson	6:53
13.	"Don't Stop 'Til You Get Enough"	Michael Jackson	4:22
14.	"Shake Your Body (Down to the Ground)"	Michael Jackson; Randy Jackson	8:34

== Personnel ==
The Jacksons

- Michael Jackson – vocals
- Jackie Jackson – vocals, percussion
- Tito Jackson – guitar, vocals
- Marlon Jackson – vocals, percussion
- Randy Jackson – vocals, congas, percussions, piano, keyboards

Additional musicians

- David Williams – guitar
- Bill Wolfer – keyboards
- Mike McKinney – bass
- Jonathan Moffett – drums
- East Coast Horns: Alan "Funt" Prater, Broderick "Mac" McMorris, Cloris Grimes, Wesley Phillips – horns

Technical

- Bill Schnee – recording, mixing
- Lynn Goldsmith, Todd Gray – photography

== Charts ==
Chart performance for The Jacksons Live!
Chart (1981–1982)	Peak position
Australian Albums (Kent Music Report)	2
Dutch Albums (Album Top 100)	43
US Billboard Top LPs & Tape	30
US Billboard Top Black Albums	10

== Certifications ==
Certifications for The Jacksons Live!
Region	Certification	Certified units/sales
United States (RIAA)	Gold	1,000,000
Summaries
Worldwide	—	2,000,000
^{*} Sales figures based on certification alone.^{^} Shipments figures based on certification alone.
