= Destiny World Tour =

1979–1980 concert tour by the Jacksons

- Tour by the Jacksons
- Poster to the concert in Columbus, USA
- Location: Europe; North America
- Associated album: Destiny; Off the Wall
- Start date: January 22, 1979
- End date: January 13, 1980
- Legs: 2
- No. of shows: 122
- Supporting acts: The Real Thing; The McCrarys; Foxy; Sister Sledge; L.T.D.; A Taste of Honey; Kool & the Gang; Osorio & Borden
- Box office: US $7.5 million ($33.27 in 2025 dollars)

The Jacksons tour chronology
- Goin' Places Tour (1978); Destiny World Tour (1979–1980); Triumph Tour (1981)

The Destiny World Tour was the third concert tour by the Jacksons to promote their album Destiny (1978). The tour began on January 22, 1979, with their opening concert in Bremen, West Germany. They visited 3 continents and 12 countries, playing approximately 83 concerts in the United States alone. The tour concluded in Honolulu, Hawaii on January 13, 1980.

== Overview ==
The tour began on January 22, 1979, in Bremen, West Germany shortly after the release of the Destiny album the previous December. The tour jolted through 2 continents, playing concerts in Europe and North America. Before taking on an approximately 80-city tour in the United States. The Jacksons took a four-month break from touring after the concert at the Greensboro Coliseum on June 10, 1979 so lead singer Michael Jackson could finish working on his solo album Off the Wall, which would be released exactly two months later.

=== Leg 1: Europe ===
The Jacksons kicked off their world tour in Europe, performing in European nightclubs and theaters throughout the United Kingdom, West Germany, Netherlands, Switzerland, France and Spain. Most dates composed of an evening and night shows.

=== Leg 2: North America ===
The Jacksons would play arenas and auditoriums, after the release of Michael's album Off the Wall, the brothers revamped their show for larger venues. For the third leg, additional songs were added to the setlist, most notably songs from Michael's new album. The opening acts in the second leg included The tour grossed an estimated 7.5 million dollars. On, November 15, 1979, Michael would end up with a kidney infection. This caused shows from November 15–21 to be cancelled from Fort Worth to Greenville. Some performances were cancelled for December for uncertainty for when Michael would get better. These shows were initially planned to be rescheduled for 1980 but ultimately got cancelled overall. The tour picked up on November 22 in Savannah. The tour ended in Honolulu on January 13, 1980.

== Opening act ==
- Sister Sledge
- L.T.D

== Set lists ==
=== Europe ===
The following set list was performed during the European leg of the tour.

1. "Dancing Machine"
2. "Things I Do for You"
3. "Ben"
4. "I Am Love"
5. "Keep on Dancing"
6. Medley: "I Want You Back" / "ABC" / "The Love You Save"
7. "I'll Be There"
8. "Band Introduction (Instrumental)"
9. "Enjoy Yourself"
10. "Destiny"
11. "Show You the Way to Go"
12. "All Night Dancin'"
13. "Blame It on the Boogie"

=== North America ===
The following set list was performed during the North American leg of the tour.

April to June

1. "Dancing Machine"
2. "Things I Do for You"
3. "Get It Together"
4. "Ben"
5. "I Am Love"
6. "Keep on Dancing"
7. "I Wanna Be Where You Are"
8. "Daddy's Home"
9. Medley: "I Want You Back" / "ABC" / "The Love You Save"
10. "I'll Be There"
11. "Enjoy Yourself"
12. "Blame It on the Boogie"
13. "Shake Your Body (Down to the Ground)"

October 1979 to January 1980

1. "Dancing Machine"
2. "Things I Do for You"
3. "Get It Together"
4. "Ben"
5. "I Am Love"
6. "Keep on Dancing"
7. "Off the Wall" (Starting in December)
8. "Daddy's Home"
9. Medley: "I Want You Back" / "ABC" / "The Love You Save"
10. "I'll Be There"
11. "Rock with You" (Starting in November)
12. "Blame It on the Boogie"
13. "Don't Stop 'Til You Get Enough" (Starting in October)
14. "Shake Your Body (Down to the Ground)"

== Tour dates ==
List of 1979 concerts
Date	City	Country	Venue	No. of shows
January 22, 1979	Bremen	West Germany	Bremerhaven Stadthalle	1
January 24, 1979	Bremen	West Germany	Bremerhaven Stadthalle	1
January 26, 1979	Bremen	West Germany	Bremerhaven Stadthalle	1
January 27, 1979	Frankfurt am Main	West Germany	Festhalle	1
January 28, 1979	Madrid	Spain	Teatro Monumental	1
January 29, 1979	Madrid	Spain	Teatro Monumental	1
January 30, 1979	Madrid	Spain	Teatro Monumental	1
January 31, 1979	Groningen	Netherlands	Martinihal Groningen	1
February 1, 1979	Amsterdam	Netherlands	Koninklijk Theater Carré	1
February 2, 1979	Amsterdam	Netherlands	Koninklijk Theater Carré	1
February 6, 1979	London	England	Rainbow Theatre	1
February 7, 1979	London	England	Rainbow Theatre	1
February 8, 1979	London	England	Rainbow Theatre	1
February 9, 1979	London	England	Rainbow Theatre	1
February 10, 1979	Brighton	England	Brighton Centre	2
February 11, 1979	Preston	England	Preston Guild Hall	1
February 12, 1979	Wakefield	England	Wakefield Theatre Club	2
February 13, 1979	Sheffield	England	Fiesta Nightclub	1
February 14, 1979	Geneva	Switzerland	Victoria Hall	1
February 15, 1979	Geneva	Switzerland	Victoria Hall	1
February 17, 1979	Manchester	England	Manchester Apollo	2
February 18, 1979	Birmingham	England	Bingley Hall	1
February 19, 1979	Halifax	England	Civic Theatre	1
February 23, 1979	London	England	Rainbow Theatre	2
February 24, 1979	London	England	Rainbow Theatre	2
February 25, 1979	Poole	England	Poole Arts Centre	1
February 26, 1979	Amsterdam	Netherlands	Koninklijk Theater Carré	2
March 1, 1979 (Note: Rescheduled from February 16, 1979 because of Michael Jackson's illness.)	Glasgow	Scotland	The Apollo	2
March 2, 1979	Paris	France	Le Palace	1
April 14, 1979	Cleveland	United States	Palace Theatre	2
April 15, 1979	Cleveland	United States	Palace Theatre	2
April 19, 1979	Devon	United States	Valley Forge Music Fair	1
April 20, 1979	Devon	United States	Valley Forge Music Fair	1
April 21, 1979	Devon	United States	Valley Forge Music Fair	2
April 22, 1979	Devon	United States	Valley Forge Music Fair	2
April 26, 1979	Niles	United States	Mill Run Playhouse	1
April 27, 1979	Niles	United States	Mill Run Playhouse	2
April 28, 1979	Niles	United States	Mill Run Playhouse	1
April 29, 1979	Niles	United States	Mill Run Playhouse	2
May 3, 1979	St. Petersburg	United States	Bayfront Center	1
May 4, 1979	Sunrise	United States	Sunrise Musical Theater	1
May 5, 1979	Sunrise	United States	Sunrise Musical Theater	1
May 6, 1979	Jacksonville	United States	Jacksonville Veterans Memorial Coliseum	1
May 10, 1979	Houston	United States	Celebrity Circle Theatre	2
May 11, 1979	Houston	United States	Celebrity Circle Theatre	2
May 12, 1979	Houston	United States	Celebrity Circle Theatre	2
May 13, 1979	Baton Rouge	United States	Riverside Centroplex Arena	1
May 16, 1979	Birmingham	United States	Boutwell Memorial Auditorium	1
May 17, 1979	Columbus	United States	Municipal Auditorium	1
May 18, 1979	Nashville	United States	Nashville Municipal Auditorium	1
May 19, 1979	Atlanta	United States	Omni Coliseum	1
May 20, 1979	Memphis	United States	Mid-South Coliseum	1
May 24, 1979	Pine Bluff	United States	Pine Bluff Convention Center	1
May 25, 1979	Kansas City	United States	Kemper Arena	1
May 26, 1979	Beaumont	United States	Fair Park Coliseum	1
May 27, 1979	Fort Worth	United States	Tarrant County Convention Center	1
May 28, 1979	Shreveport	United States	Hirsch Memorial Coliseum	1
May 30, 1979	Oklahoma City	United States	Jim Norick Arena	1
June 1, 1979	Milwaukee	United States	Milwaukee County Stadium	1
June 2, 1979	Norfolk	United States	Norfolk Scope	1
June 3, 1979	Columbia	United States	Carolina Coliseum	1
June 8, 1979	Charlotte	United States	Charlotte Coliseum	1
June 9, 1979	Landover	United States	Capital Centre	1
June 10, 1979	Greensboro	United States	Greensboro Memorial Coliseum	1
October 2, 1979	New Orleans	United States	Municipal Auditorium	1
October 3, 1979	New Orleans	United States	Municipal Auditorium	1
October 4, 1979	Shreveport	United States	Hirsch Memorial Coliseum	1
October 5, 1979	Baton Rouge	United States	Riverside Centroplex Arena	1
October 6, 1979	Huntsville	United States	Von Braun Civic Center	1
October 7, 1979	Louisville	United States	Freedom Hall	1
October 12, 1979	Philadelphia	United States	Spectrum	1
October 13, 1979	Rochester	United States	Rochester Community War Memorial	1
October 14, 1979	Pittsburgh	United States	Civic Arena	1
October 18, 1979	Saginaw	United States	Saginaw Civic Center	1
October 19, 1979	Indianapolis	United States	Market Square Arena	1
October 20, 1979	St. Louis	United States	Kiel Auditorium	1
October 21, 1979	Dayton	United States	University of Dayton Arena	1
October 25, 1979	Columbus	United States	Fairgrounds Coliseum	1
October 26, 1979	Syracuse	United States	Onondaga County War Memorial	1
October 27, 1979	Buffalo	United States	Buffalo Memorial Auditorium	1
October 28, 1979	Springfield	United States	Springfield Civic Center	1
November 1, 1979	Kalamazoo	United States	Wings Stadium	1
November 2, 1979	Chicago	United States	Chicago Stadium	1
November 3, 1979	Cleveland	United States	Public Auditorium	1
November 4, 1979	Detroit	United States	Cobo Arena	1
November 5, 1979	Detroit	United States	Cobo Arena	1
November 7, 1979	Baltimore	United States	Baltimore Civic Center	1
November 8, 1979	Uniondale	United States	Nassau Veterans Memorial Coliseum	1
November 9, 1979	Richmond	United States	Richmond Coliseum	1
November 10, 1979	Hampton	United States	Hampton Coliseum	1
November 11, 1979	Roanoke	United States	Roanoke Civic Center	1
November 22, 1979	Savannah	United States	Savannah Civic Center	1
November 23, 1979	Macon	United States	Macon Coliseum	1
November 24, 1979	Nashville	United States	Nashville Municipal Auditorium	1
November 25, 1979	Memphis	United States	Mid-South Coliseum	1
November 29, 1979	Atlanta	United States	Omni Coliseum (Note: Originally scheduled for University Arena in Albuquerque)	1
November 30, 1979	Mobile	United States	Mobile Municipal Auditorium (Note: Originally scheduled for McNichols Sports Arena in Denver)	1
December 6, 1979 (Note: Originally scheduled for November 18, 1979)	Houston	United States	The Summit (Note: Originally scheduled for Memorial Coliseum in Portland)	1
December 13, 1979	San Bernardino	United States	Swing Auditorium	1
December 15, 1979	San Diego	United States	San Diego Sports Arena	1
December 16, 1979	Oakland	United States	Oakland–Alameda County Coliseum Arena	1
December 18, 1979	Inglewood	United States	The Forum	1
December 21, 1979	Nassau	The Bahamas	Queen Elizabeth Sports Arena	1

List of 1980 concerts
Date	City	Country	Venue	No. of shows
January 11, 1980	Honolulu	United States	Neal S. Blaisdell Arena	1
January 12, 1980	Honolulu	United States	Neal S. Blaisdell Arena	1
January 13, 1980	Honolulu	United States	Neal S. Blaisdell Arena	1

== Cancelled dates ==
List of cancelled concerts, showing date, city, country, venue, and reason for cancellation
Date	City	Country	Venue	Reason
February 20, 1979 (2 shows)	Leicester	England	De Montfort Hall	Health problems
February 21, 1979	Cardiff	Wales	Sophia Gardens Pavilion	Health problems
February 29, 1979 (2 shows)	Avignon	France	Théâtre des Carmes	Foodborne illness
March 6–10, 1979 (2 shows 7th-9th)	Johannesburg	South Africa	Colosseum Theatre	Brothers didn't support racial segregation of audiences
March 12–14, 1979 (2 shows on 12th)	Durban	South Africa	Playhouse Theatre	Brothers didn't support racial segregation of audiences
March 16–18, 1979 (2 shows on 16th)	Cape Town	South Africa	3 Arts Theatre	Brothers didn't support racial segregation of audiences
March 19–20, 1979 (2 shows each)	Johannesburg	South Africa	Colosseum Theatre	Brothers didn't support racial segregation of audiences
April 7, 1979	Owings Mills	United States	Painters Mill Music Fair	N/A
April 8, 1979 (2 shows)	Owings Mills	United States	Painters Mill Music Fair	N/A
April 11, 1979 (2 shows)	Springfield	United States	Springfield Civic Center	N/A
April 12, 1979	Cincinnati	United States	Palace Theatre	N/A
April 13, 1979	Cincinnati	United States	Palace Theatre	N/A
November 11, 1979	Fayetteville	United States	Cumberland County Memorial Auditorium	N/A
November 14, 1979	Norman	United States	Lloyd Noble Center	N/A
November 15, 1979 (Note: Originally scheduled for Riverside Centroplex Arena in Baton Rouge)	Fort Worth	United States	Tarrant County Convention Center	Michael's kidney infection
November 16, 1979	Jackson	United States	Mississippi Coliseum	Michael's kidney infection
November 17, 1979	Lake Charles	United States	Burton Coliseum	Michael's kidney infection
November 21, 1979	Greenville	United States	Greenville Memorial Auditorium	Michael's kidney infection
November 27, 1979	Columbus	United States	Columbus Municipal Auditorium	Initially cancelled for Michael's kidney infection, cancelled overall
December 6, 1979	Portland	United States	Memorial Coliseum	N/A
December 8, 1979	Seattle	United States	Seattle Center Coliseum	N/A
December 9, 1979	Vancouver	Canada	Pacific Coliseum	N/A
December 10, 1979	Fort Worth	United States	Tarrant County Convention Center	Initially cancelled for Michael's kidney infection, cancelled overall
December 14, 1979	Phoenix	United States	Arizona Veterans Memorial Coliseum	Travel schedules
January 9, 1980	San Antonio	United States	San Antonio Convention Center Arena	N/A

== Personnel ==
- Michael Jackson – vocals
- Jackie Jackson – vocals
- Tito Jackson – guitar, vocals
- Marlon Jackson – vocals
- Randy Jackson – vocals, congas, percussion, piano, keyboards

=== Band members ===
First leg

- Michael McKinney – bass
- Bud Rizzo – additional guitar
- James McField – keyboards
- Tony Lewis – drums

Second leg

- Jonathan Moffett – drums
- Bud Rizzo – additional guitar
- Michael McKinney – bass
- James McField – keyboards
- Wesley Phillips, Cloris Grimes, Alan "Funt" Prater, Roderick "Mac" McMorris – horns (East Coast Horns)
