= Municipal Auditorium (Columbus, Georgia) =

Multi-purpose arena in Columbus, Georgia

Coordinates: 32.4523°N 84.9877°W

The Municipal Auditorium was a 3,916-seat multi-purpose arena located in Columbus, Georgia. It was opened September 6, 1957 and closed in 1996, when construction began on the Columbus Civic Center. It hosted local sporting events and concerts. Notable events included performances by Count Basie, Buddy Holly, and a speech by President Ronald Reagan.
