= Walk Right Now =

Single by the Jacksons

from the album Triumph
- B-side: "Your Ways"
- Released: June 15, 1981
- Recorded: 1980
- Length: 6:27 (Album Version); 3:35 (European 7-inch Version); 4:25 (US 7-inch Version); 7:36 (12" Special Dance Remix)
- Label: Epic
- Songwriters: Michael Jackson; Jackie Jackson; Randy Jackson
- Producer: The Jacksons

The Jacksons singles chronology
| "Can You Feel It" (1981) | "Walk Right Now" (1981) | "State of Shock" (1984) |

"Walk Right Now" is a 1981 song written, produced and performed by the Jacksons and issued as the fourth and final single from the group's album, Triumph.

The song was written by Michael Jackson, Jackie Jackson, and Randy Jackson and is about a man fed up with his lover's excuses about her infidelity.

When released, the song performed only modestly on US pop radio, peaking at a number seventy-three, but the song became a hit in the UK, where it peaked at number seven on the UK singles chart.

Record World praised the vocal performance and said that the song "explodes from the outset with an energetic rhythm kick on the bottom and colorful synthesizer lines, guitar riffs and handclaps on top."

The song was performed live during the Jacksons' Triumph Tour in 1981, but only for the first few shows.

== Personnel ==
- Written and composed by Michael Jackson, Jackie Jackson and Randy Jackson
- Produced by the Jacksons
- Arranged by Michael Jackson
- Lead vocals: Michael Jackson
- Background vocals: The Jacksons
- Instrumentation:
  - Piano: Greg Phillinganes
  - Synthesizers: Greg Phillinganes, Webster Lewis, Michael Boddicker
  - Guitars: Tito Jackson, David Williams
  - Bass: Nathan Watts
  - Drums: Ollie E. Brown
  - Vibes: Gary Coleman
  - Percussion: Paulinho da Costa
  - Horns: Jerry Hey, Kim Hutchcroft, Bill Reichenbach, Larry Hall
  - Flute: Gary Herbig

== Charts ==
| Chart (1980–1981) | Peak position |
|---|---|
| Ireland (IRMA) | 16 |
| Netherlands (Single Top 100) | 32 |
| UK Singles (OCC) | 7 |
| US Billboard Hot 100 | 73 |
| US Dance Club Songs (Billboard) | 1 |
| US Hot R&B/Hip-Hop Songs (Billboard) | 50 |
