= J Is for Jackson 5 =

Compilation album by the Jackson 5
- Released: March 30, 2010
- Recorded: 1969–1973
- Genre: R&B; soul; disco; funk
- Label: Universal Motown

The Jackson 5 chronology
I Want You Back! Unreleased Masters (2009)	J Is for Jackson 5 (2010)	Live at the Forum (2010)

Professional ratings
Review scores
Source	Rating
AllMusic	2.5/5 stars

J Is for Jackson 5 is a Jackson 5 compilation released on March 30, 2010. The album was released under Universal Motown's "Universal Music Family" line, compiling hits suitable for children and their parents.

== Track listing ==
1. "I Want You Back"
2. "Zip-a-Dee-Doo-Dah"
3. "The Love You Save"
4. "ABC"
5. "2-4-6-8"
6. "I'll Be There"
7. "Little Bitty Pretty One"
8. "E-Ne-Me-Ne-Mi-Ne-Moe (The Choice Is Yours to Pull)"
9. "My Little Baby"
10. "Corner of the Sky"
11. "Dancing Machine"
12. "Mama's Pearl"
13. "I Want You Back" (Karaoke)
14. "The Love You Save" (Karaoke)
15. "I'll Be There" (Karaoke)
16. "Mama's Pearl" (Karaoke)
