= Off the Wall (Michael Jackson song) =

- Artwork for German and Dutch vinyl releases

Single by Michael Jackson

from the album Off the Wall
- B-side: "Get on the Floor"
- Released: November 16, 1979 (UK); January 31, 1980 (US)
- Recorded: December 1978
- Studio: Allen Zentz, Westlake and Cherokee, Los Angeles
- Genre: Disco; funk
- Length: 4:05 (album version); 3:47 (single version)
- Label: Epic; CBS
- Songwriter: Rod Temperton
- Producer: Quincy Jones

Michael Jackson singles chronology
"Rock with You" (1979)	"Off the Wall" (1979)	"She's Out of My Life" (1980)

Alternative release(s)
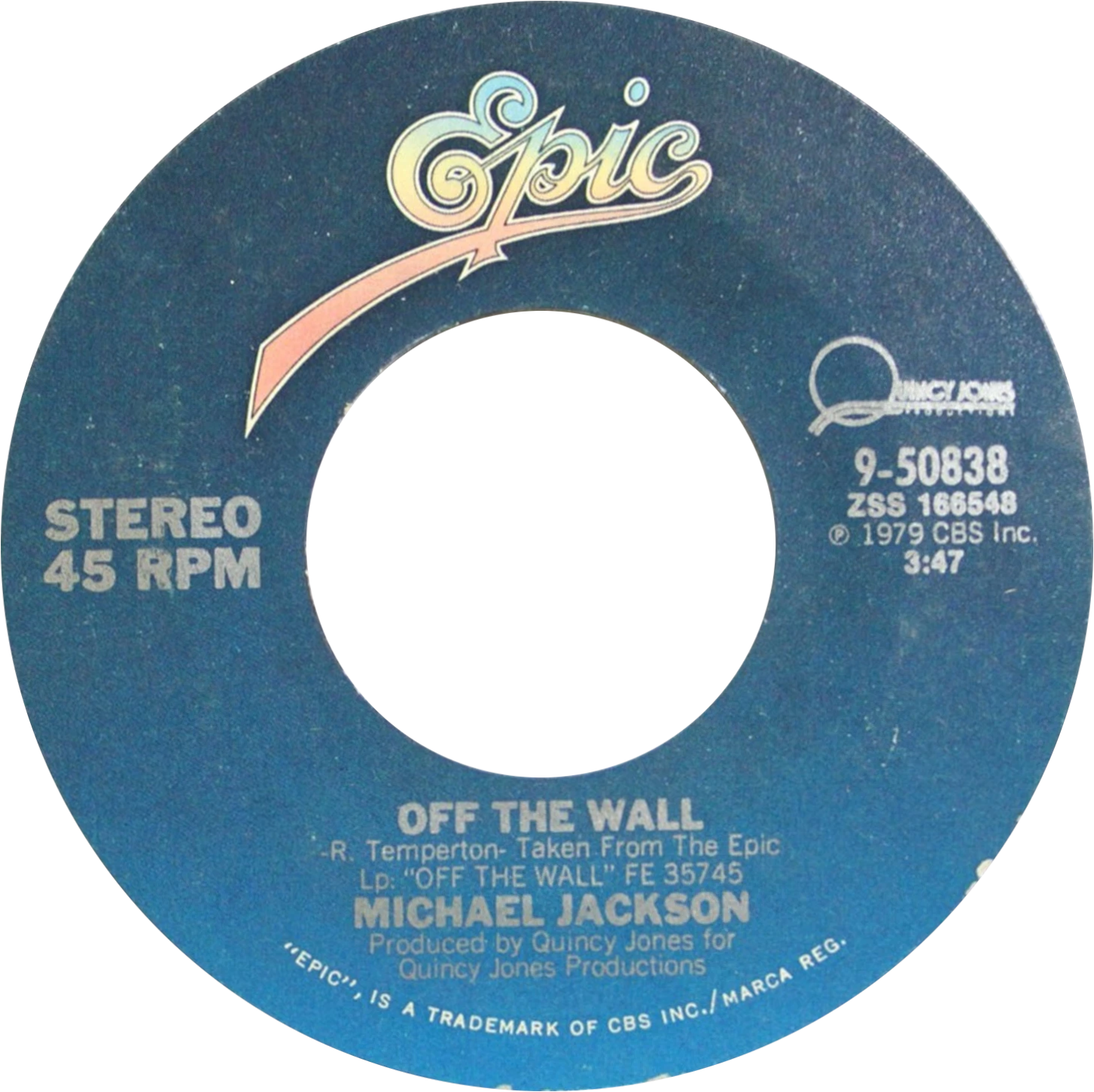
- Side A of the US vinyl single

Official audio
- "Off the Wall" on YouTube

"Off the Wall" is a disco and funk song by American singer Michael Jackson, and the title track from his fifth studio album, Off the Wall (1979). Written by Rod Temperton and produced by Quincy Jones, it was released by Epic Records as the album’s second single in the UK on November 16, 1979 and as the third single in the US on January 31, 1980. The song was originally offered to Karen Carpenter while she was working on her first solo studio album, but she declined to record it. Lyrically, the song explores escapism and emotional release, with the narrator seeking relief from daily stress and personal troubles by leaving worries behind and immersing in music and dance.

The song received positive reviews from music critics and was widely regarded as one of the standout tracks on the album. It became Jackson’s third top 10 single from the album, which ultimately produced four top 10 entries in total, becoming the first solo artist to do so. The song peaked at number ten on the Billboard Hot 100 chart and number five on the Billboard Soul Singles chart.

== Reception ==
AllMusic critic Stephen Thomas Erlewine highlighted the song as one of the album’s most standout tracks.

Cash Box praised the song, calling it “another killer” following Jackson’s previous number-one hits "Rock with You," and "Don't Stop 'Til You Get Enough," writing that its "fluid, sashaying dance beat" and "party atmosphere were enhanced by horns and Jackson's multitracked vocals."

== Other versions and samples ==
Mariah Carey interpolated "Off the Wall" in her 2008 song "I'm That Chick."

Saint Pepsi sampled "Off the Wall" in his 2013 song "Enjoy Yourself."

Pete Rock sampled "Off the Wall" on the 1998 song "Stay Away," which featured De La Soul and Rob-O.

PinkPantheress sampled "Off the Wall" in her 2021 single "Just a Waste."

== Track listing ==
European 7" single (EPC 8045)
No.	Title	Length
1.	"Off the Wall" (remix (Note: No version description listed on the actual single.))	4:01
2.	"Workin' Day and Night"	5:10
Total length:		9:10

US 7" single (9-50838)
No.	Title	Length
1.	"Off the Wall" (7" remix)	3:47
2.	"Get on the Floor"	4:38
Total length:		8:26

=== Official versions ===
1. Album version – 4:05
2. Remix – 4:01
3. 7" remix – 3:47
4. Edit – 3:46 – Featured on the Essential Collection is an early fade of the album version.
5. Junior Vasquez mix – 5:13 – Featured on the Stranger in Moscow single.
6. Live – 4:00 – Featured on The Jacksons Live!.

The US and Japanese single releases featured a remix with a running time of 3:47, while the UK and other international releases included an alternate remix running 4:01.

== Personnel ==
- Written and composed by Rod Temperton
- Produced by Quincy Jones
- Recorded and mixed by Bruce Swedien
- Michael Jackson: Lead and background vocals
- Louis Johnson: Bass
- John Robinson: Drums
- David Williams, Marlo Henderson: Guitars
- Greg Phillinganes: Rhodes piano, synthesizer
- Michael Boddicker: Synthesizer programming
- George Duke: Synthesizer, synthesizer programming
- Paulinho da Costa: Percussion
- Horns arranged by Jerry Hey and performed by The Seawind Horns:
  - Jerry Hey: Trumpet, flugelhorn
  - Larry Williams: Tenor and alto saxophones, flute
  - Kim Hutchcroft: Baritone and tenor saxophones, flute
  - William Reichenbach: Trombone
  - Gary Grant: Trumpet
- Rhythm and vocal arrangements by Rod Temperton
- Sound effects by George Duke

== Charts ==
=== Weekly charts ===
1979–1980 weekly chart performance for "Off the Wall"
Chart (1979–1980)	Peak position
Australia (Kent Music Report)	94
Canada Top Singles (RPM)	11
Ireland (IRMA)	20
Netherlands (Single Top 100)	18
Netherlands (Dutch Top 40)	23
New Zealand (Recorded Music NZ)	14
Norway (VG-lista)	4
South Africa (Springbok Radio)	20
Sweden (Sverigetopplistan)	9
UK Singles (Official Charts)	7
US Billboard Hot 100	10
US Hot R&B/Hip-Hop Songs (Billboard)	5
US Cash Box Top 100	11
US Radio & Records CHR/Pop Airplay Chart	9

2009 weekly chart performance for "Off the Wall"
Chart (2009)	Peak position
Netherlands (Single Top 100)	20
Switzerland (Schweizer Hitparade)	81
UK Singles (Official Charts)	73
US Digital Songs (Billboard)	51

=== Year-end charts ===
Year-end chart performance for "Off the Wall"
Chart (1980)	Position
Canada Top Singles (RPM)	69
US Billboard Hot 100	79
US Cash Box Top 100	84

== Certifications ==
Region	Certification	Certified units/sales
Mexico (AMPROFON)	Platinum	60,000^{‡}
New Zealand (RMNZ)	Gold	15,000^{‡}
United Kingdom (BPI)	Gold	400,000^{‡}
United States (RIAA)	Platinum	1,000,000^{‡}
^{‡} Sales+streaming figures based on certification alone.
