= Lovely One =

Single by the Jacksons

from the album Triumph
- B-side: "Bless His Soul"
- Released: September 1980
- Recorded: March-August 1980
- Genre: Funk; post-disco
- Length: 4:52 (LP version); 3:45 (7" edit)
- Label: Epic
- Songwriters: Michael Jackson; Randy Jackson
- Producer: The Jacksons

The Jacksons singles chronology
"Shake Your Body (Down to the Ground)" (1979)	"Lovely One" (1980)	"This Place Hotel" (1980)

"Lovely One" is a funk single released by American family group the Jacksons in September 1980.

Released as the first single from the brothers' Triumph, it followed the hit "Shake Your Body (Down to the Ground)". "Lovely One" nearly matched the success of the previous song, reaching number twelve on the Billboard Hot 100, number two on the Black Singles chart, and, along with the tracks "Can You Feel It" and "Walk Right Now", it hit number one on the dance chart for one week.

Record World praised Michael Jackson's lead vocal performance.

== Credits ==
- Written and composed by Michael Jackson and Randy Jackson
- Produced by the Jacksons
- Arrangement by Michael Jackson and Tom Tom 84
- Lead vocals by Michael Jackson
- Background vocals by the Jacksons: Jackie Jackson, Tito Jackson, Randy Jackson and Marlon Jackson
- Instrumentation:
  - Keyboards: Greg Phillinganes
  - Guitars: Tito Jackson, David Williams, Mike Sembello
  - Bass: Nathan Watts
  - Drums: Ollie E. Brown
  - Percussion: Paulinho da Costa

== Charts ==
Chart (1980–1981)	Peak position
U.S. Billboard Hot 100	12
U.S. Billboard Hot Soul Singles	2
U.S. Billboard Hot Dance Club Play	1
Canada RPM Canada Top Singles	40
