= This Place Hotel =

- Original artwork for UK vinyl release

Single by The Jacksons

from the album Triumph
- B-side: "Things I Do for You"
- Released: November 1980
- Recorded: 1980
- Genre: Post-disco; disco-pop
- Length: 5:44 (album version); 4:52 (single version)
- Label: Epic
- Songwriter: Michael Jackson
- Producer: The Jacksons

The Jacksons singles chronology
"Lovely One" (1980)	"This Place Hotel" (1980)	"Can You Feel It" (1981)

Audio
- "This Place Hotel" on YouTube

"This Place Hotel" (originally named "Heartbreak Hotel") is a 1980 song by the Jacksons, written by Michael Jackson. While his brothers did not sing background vocals, they were credited with playing percussion on the album while brother Tito contributed a guitar solo. The song has a tempo of 98 beats per minute, making it notably slower than many of the other disco-based songs on the album. In the song, the protagonist speaks of a time when ten years ago, he took his girlfriend to a hotel for a romantic night—only to find out that it was designed specifically to break couples up. The staff at the hotel gave the girl the impression that he had cheated on her with someone else, something he did not do, which caused her to break up with him in the hotel.

Record World praised Michael Jackson's lead vocals, the "hypnotic chorus backing" and the horn / string arrangement.

== Chart success ==
The song reached No. 22 on the Billboard pop singles chart and No. 2 on the R&B singles chart. "This Place Hotel" was the group's second biggest single off their Triumph album, behind "Lovely One". The song, in turn, became a popular concert performance for the group's next two tours into Michael's own Bad World Tour. The song, like "Can You Feel It", was sampled fairly often in hip hop.

== Name change ==
The song's title was changed to "This Place Hotel" to avoid confusion with the 1956 Elvis Presley hit, "Heartbreak Hotel". Jackson said he was unaware of the Presley song and the fact that the title was changed. He also denied being influenced by Presley in his autobiography Moonwalk, but acknowledged Presley's importance to both black and white music.

The original title of "Heartbreak Hotel" was used and released commercially on 7" vinyl in many countries, though a 2-track 12" maxi single was produced and promotional-only copies were given to radio stations and reviewers. A limited 2-track Japanese mini CD single (using the newly chosen title) was commercially released in November 1988 to coincide with Michael's Bad World Tour.

== Performances ==
The song was performed on the Jacksons' Triumph Tour (thus appears on The Jacksons Live album) and was subsequently used on the Jacksons' Victory Tour. When Michael Jackson first toured as a solo act, "This Place Hotel" was the only Jacksons song to be used in both legs of the Bad World Tour, whereas the other songs by the group (with the exception of a medley of early Jackson 5 hits) were retired during the second leg. A spoken word and synth recording preceded the song on the first leg of the Bad World Tour, but for the second leg of the tour (and on the subsequent Dangerous World Tour) that recording was used as an intro to Jackson's hit "Smooth Criminal" instead.

== Releases ==
The song was included on Michael Jackson's The Ultimate Collection and it has been remixed on the Immortal album in 2011 and was performed live during the Immortal World Tour (Cirque de Soleil) as well as Michael Jackson: One. It was also part of Jackson's Halloween-themed collection, Scream (2017). A live version of the song is available on the 2012 DVD Live at Wembley July 16, 1988. On March 23, 2014, a video clip of a live performance of the song from the Victory Tour was uploaded to the Jacksons' official YouTube account.

== Track listing ==
These are the formats and track listings of major single releases of "This Place Hotel" (previously "Heartbreak Hotel").

7" vinyl single - US (Epic – 19-50959)
No.	Title	Writer(s)	Length
1.	"Heartbreak Hotel"	Michael Jackson	4:49
2.	"Things I Do For You"	T. Jackson, J. Jackson, M. Jackson, M. Jackson, R. Jackson,	4:05

7" vinyl single - UK (Epic – S EPC 9391)
No.	Title	Writer(s)	Length
1.	"Heartbreak Hotel"	Michael Jackson	4:47
2.	"Different Kind Of Lady"	The Jacksons	3:36

CD single - Japan
No.	Title	Writer(s)	Length
1.	"This Place Hotel"	Michael Jackson	5:45
2.	"Lovely One"	Michael Jackson, Randy Jackson	3:45

CD single 1989 - Austria (Epc 654555 3)
No.	Title	Writer(s)	Length
1.	"Heartbreak Hotel"	Michael Jackson	5:42
2.	"Blame It on the Boogie"	Mick Jackson, Dave Jackson, Elmar Krohn	6:56

== Personnel ==
- Written, arranged and composed by Michael Jackson
- Produced by the Jacksons
- Associate Producer: Greg Phillinganes
- Lead and background vocals by Michael Jackson
- Additional background vocals: Stephanie Spruill, Maxine Willard Waters, and Julia Tillman Waters
- Horn arrangement by Tom Tom 84
- Prelude arrangement by Jerry Hey
- Instrumentation:
  - Keyboards: Greg Phillinganes
  - Guitars: Tito Jackson, David Williams, Mike Sembello, Paul Jackson Jr.
  - Bass: Nathan Watts
  - Drums: Ollie E. Brown
  - Percussion: The Jacksons, Paulinho da Costa
  - Timpani: Marlon Jackson
- Scream: La Toya Jackson

== Charts ==
Chart (1980–81)	Peak position
U.S. Billboard Hot 100	22
U.S. Billboard Hot Soul Singles	2
