= Triumph (The Jacksons album) =

Studio album by the Jacksons
- Released: September 26, 1980
- Recorded: March - August 1980
- Studios: Capitol; Hollywood Sound; Davien Sound; Sound City; Devonshire Sound; Westlake (Hollywood)
- Length: 44:39
- Labels: Epic; CBS
- Producer: The Jacksons

The Jacksons chronology
Boogie (1979)	Triumph (1980)	The Jacksons Live! (1981)

Singles from Triumph
- 1. "Lovely One" Released: September 1980; 2. "Heartbreak Hotel" Released: November 1980; 3. "Can You Feel It" Released: February 1981; 4. "Walk Right Now" Released: June 1981; 5. "Time Waits for No One" Released: September 1981 (UK)

Triumph is the fourteenth studio album by the Jacksons, released on September 26, 1980, by Epic Records. The album was produced and written by the Jacksons.

The album was certified Platinum by the Recording Industry Association of America (RIAA) in the United States and peaked at No. 10 on the US Billboard Top LPs & Tape chart. In the UK the album entered the charts on October 11, where it eventually peaked at No. 13. Triumph sold three million copies worldwide in its original run. Hit singles from the album were "Lovely One", "Heartbreak Hotel" (which was later renamed "This Place Hotel" to avoid confusion with the Elvis Presley song "Heartbreak Hotel"), "Can You Feel It" and "Walk Right Now".

The Jacksons shared lead vocals and solo spots on some songs on the album, but Michael Jackson, who had recently released his multi-platinum selling album Off the Wall (1979), handles most of the lead vocals and writing duties. Triumph was the Jacksons' first album to reach number-one on the US Billboard R&B Albums chart since Maybe Tomorrow in 1971. The album sold over three million copies worldwide. On December 10, 1980, Triumph achieved its Platinum certification in the United States for the sales of over one million copies in the country. It was also nominated for the Grammy Award for Best R&B Performance by a Duo or Group with Vocals in 1981.

== Re-release ==
Triumph, was re-released on January 27, 2009, on Epic/Legacy, a division of Sony Music Entertainment, with three bonus tracks of rare 7-inch and 12-inch mixes previously unavailable on CD. It was again re-released in digital format in 2021, with Victory and 2300 Jackson Street.

== Critical reception ==
Professional ratings
Review scores
Source	Rating
AllMusic	4/5 stars
American Songwriter	4/5 stars
Billboard	(unrated)
PopMatters	7/10 stars
(The New) Rolling Stone Album Guide	4.5/5 stars
Uncut	5/5 stars
The Village Voice	A−

Triumph received widespread critical acclaim. AllMusic stated, "Released during the summer of 1980, just as the hits from Michael's Off the Wall were sliding off the charts, Triumph became the Jacksons' first Top Ten pop album since 1972's Lookin' Through the Windows."

== Commercial performance ==
The album was certified platinum on December 10, 1980.

== Track listing ==
Side A
No.	Title	Writer(s)	Length
1.	"Can You Feel It"	Michael Jackson; Jackie Jackson	6:00
2.	"Lovely One"	Michael Jackson; Randy Jackson	4:52
3.	"Your Ways"	Jackie Jackson	4:31
4.	"Everybody"	Michael Jackson; Tito Jackson; Mike McKinney	5:00

Side B
No.	Title	Writer(s)	Length
5.	"Heartbreak Hotel" (later renamed "This Place Hotel")	Michael Jackson	5:44
6.	"Time Waits for No One"	Jackie Jackson; Randy Jackson	3:24
7.	"Walk Right Now"	Michael Jackson; Jackie Jackson; Randy Jackson	6:29
8.	"Give It Up"	Michael Jackson; Randy Jackson	4:20
9.	"Wondering Who"	Jackie Jackson; Randy Jackson	4:19

2009 re-edition bonus tracks
No.	Title	Length
10.	"This Place Hotel" (single version)	4:52
11.	"Walk Right Now" (John Luongo disco mix)	7:36
12.	"Walk Right Now" (John Luongo instrumental mix)	6:58

2021 re-edition bonus tracks
No.	Title	Length
10.	"Can You Feel It" (Jacksons X MLK remix)	7:36
11.	"Can You Feel It" (Island remix featuring David Sanborn)	5:46
12.	"Can You Feel It" (Kirk Franklin remix featuring Tamela Mann)	5:49
13.	"Can You Feel It" (7" version)	3:51
14.	"Lovely One" (7" version)	3:49
15.	"This Place Hotel" (7" version)	4:51
16.	"Walk Right Now" (7" version)	4:26
17.	"Walk Right Now" (John Luongo special remix)	5:49
18.	"Walk Right Now" (John Luongo disco mix)	7:36
19.	"Walk Right Now" (John Luongo instrumental mix)	6:58

== Personnel ==
The Jacksons

- Michael Jackson – lead and backing vocals, percussion
- Jackie Jackson – backing vocals, lead vocals (track 9)
- Tito Jackson – guitar, backing vocals
- Marlon Jackson – backing vocals, timpani (track 5), co-lead vocals (track 8)
- Randy Jackson – percussion, backing vocals, co-lead vocals (track 1)

Additional personnel

- David Williams – guitar (1–5, 7–9)
- Paul Jackson Jr. – guitar (5)
- Greg Poree – guitar (6)
- Michael Sembello – guitar (2, 5, 8)
- Phil Upchurch – guitar (3)
- Michael Boddicker – synthesizer (7, 9)
- Ronnie Foster – keyboards (1, 9)
- Webster Lewis – synthesizer (7)
- Greg Phillinganes – keyboards (1–9), synthesizers (7)
- Gary Coleman – vibraphone (1, 7, 8)
- Clay Drayton – bass (6, 8)
- Mike McKinney – bass (4)
- Nathan Watts – bass (1–3, 5, 7)
- Ollie E. Brown – drums (1, 2, 4–9)
- Lenny Castro – percussion (9)
- Paulinho da Costa – percussion (2, 3, 5–8)
- Gary Herbig – flute (7)
- Larry Hall – horns (4, 7)
- Jerry Hey – horns (4, 5, 7)
- Kim Hutchcroft – horns (4, 7)
- Bill Reichenbach – horns (4, 7)
- La Toya Jackson – voice scream (5)
- Julia Tillman Waters, Maxine Willard Waters, Stephanie Spruill – backing vocals (track 5)
- Audra Tillman, Brian Stilwell, Brigette Bush, Gerry Gruberth, Lita Aubrey, Peter Wade, Rhonda Gentry, Roger Kenerly II, Soloman Daniels, Yolanda Kenerly – backing vocals (The Children's Choir) (track 1)
- Arnold McCuller, Bob Mack, Bunny Hull, Carmen Twillie, Carolyn Dennis, Gerry Garrett, Gregory Wright, Jim Gilstrap, Josie James, Lewis Price, Lisa Roberts, Paulette Brown, Paulette McWilliams, Phyllis St. James, Tyrell "Rock" Deadrick, Roger Kenerly-Saint, Ronald Vann, Roy Galloway, Venetta Fields – backing vocals (The Adults' Choir) (track 1)

Production

- Produced, arranged, written and composed by the Jacksons except for "Everybody" (written by Michael Jackson, Tito Jackson and Mike McKinney)
- Greg Phillinganes – associate producer
- Tom Perry – engineer
- Tom "Tom Tom 84" Washington – arrangements on "Can You Feel It", "Lovely One", "Your Ways" and "Heartbreak Hotel"
- Jerry Hey – arrangements on "Everybody" and "Heartbreak Hotel"
- Jerry Peters – arrangements on "Time Waits for No One", "Give It Up" and string arrangements (6, 8)

== Charts ==
=== Weekly charts ===
Chart (1980–1981)	Peak position
Australian Albums (Kent Music Report)	13
Canadian Albums (RPM)	7
Dutch Albums (Album Top 100)	25
New Zealand Albums (RMNZ)	8
Swedish Albums (Sverigetopplistan)	46
UK Albums (OCC)	13
US Billboard 200	10
US Top R&B/Hip-Hop Albums (Billboard)	1
Zimbabwean Albums (ZIMA)	10

=== Year-end charts ===
Chart (1981)	Position
US Billboard 200	62
US Top R&B/Hip-Hop Albums (Billboard)	10

=== Singles ===
Year	Single	Chart positions					
Year	Single	US	US R&B	US Dance	UK	IRE	AUS
1980	"Lovely One"	12	2	1	29	17	—
1980	"Heartbreak Hotel"	22	2	—	44	—	—
1981	"Can You Feel It"	77	30	1	6	12	10
1981	"Walk Right Now"	73	50	1	7	16	—

== Certifications ==
Region	Certification	Certified units/sales
Australia (ARIA)	Platinum	50,000^{^}
New Zealand (RMNZ)	Gold	7,500^{^}
United Kingdom (BPI)	Gold	100,000^{^}
United States (RIAA)	Platinum	1,000,000^{^}
Summaries
Worldwide	—	10,000,000
^{^} Shipments figures based on certification alone.
