= David Williams (guitarist) =

American musician and producer

- Born: November 21, 1950
- Origin: Newport News, Virginia, U.S.
- Died: March 6, 2009 (aged 58) Hampton, Virginia, U.S.
- Genres: R&B; disco; funk; soul
- Occupations: Guitarist; singer; songwriter; record producer
- Instruments: Vocals; guitar; bass guitar
- Years active: 1968–2009
- Formerly of: Chanson

David Williams (November 21, 1950 – March 6, 2009) was an American guitarist, singer, songwriter, and producer. He played as a session guitarist for artists including Madonna and Michael Jackson.

== Background ==
Williams grew up in Newport News, Virginia. At a young age, he was influenced by Kenny Burrell, Wes Montgomery and other jazz artists.

== Career ==
Williams later began his professional music career with The Dells, an R&B group. When he went on to serve in the Vietnam War his career was put on hold. After returning to the U.S. in 1972 he moved to Los Angeles reuniting with the Dells. He also worked with the Temptations at that point. Soon he established, with bassist James Jamerson, Jr., the R&B group Chanson. Chanson released the 1978 single "Don't Hold Back" which rose to No. 21, #11 and No. 8 on the Hot 100, Dance Club and Hot R&B Songs charts respectively.

Williams was brought to Michael Jackson's attention by Everett "Blood" Hollins, who had heard Chanson on the radio and was impressed with Williams' guitar playing. He was hired to play on Jackson's 1979 album Off the Wall. He was also featured on every song but one (second only to Tito Jackson) for the Jacksons' 1980 album Triumph. He also played on the Jacksons' 1981 concert tour, which was recorded for the album The Jacksons Live!

Williams became a popular session guitarist, playing on albums by the Pointer Sisters (1980), Peter Allen (1980), Aretha Franklin (1980), and the Four Tops (1981). In 1982, he worked with Michael Jackson again on Michael Jackson's Thriller album, where his signature funky strumming and a minimalist solo famously anchor "Billie Jean". Williams played rhythm guitar on Stevie Nicks' 1983 single "Stand Back". In 1986, Williams joined Madonna's recording and touring bands, contributing to 1986's True Blue and 1989's Like a Prayer, and performing on the 1987 Who's That Girl World Tour and the 1990 Blond Ambition World Tour. During this period of time, Williams also performed on Michael Jackson's album Bad (1987) with hit songs including "Bad", "The Way You Make Me Feel", "Dirty Diana" and "Smooth Criminal".

He made a contribution to films singing lead on the song "No Negatives of You" which he co-composed with Bill Kinzi and A. Shapiro. It was in the Nico Mastorakis 1987 directed comedy Terminal Exposure. Unfortunately it wasn't included in the soundtrack which was released by Notefornote Entertainment on August 12, 2022.

== Personal life and death ==
Williams had two daughters, actress Davida Williams and singer Dana Williams. He died of cardiac arrest on March 6, 2009 in Hampton, Virginia southeast of Williamsburg at age 58.

== Discography ==
Solo albums

- Take the Ball and Run (1983)
- Somethin' Special (1991)
