= Shake Your Body (Down to the Ground) =

- European 12-inch single cover

Single by the Jacksons

from the album Destiny
- B-side: "That's What You Get (for Being Polite)"; "All Night Dancin'"
- Released: January 18, 1979
- Recorded: 1978
- Studio: Los Angeles, California
- Genre: Disco; funk
- Length: 8:00 (album); 3:47 (7-inch); 8:37 (extended); 2:27 (Immortal version)
- Label: Epic
- Songwriters: Michael Jackson; Randy Jackson
- Producer: The Jacksons

The Jacksons singles chronology
"Blame It on the Boogie" (1978)	"Shake Your Body (Down to the Ground)" (1979)	"Lovely One" (1980)

Alternative release(s)
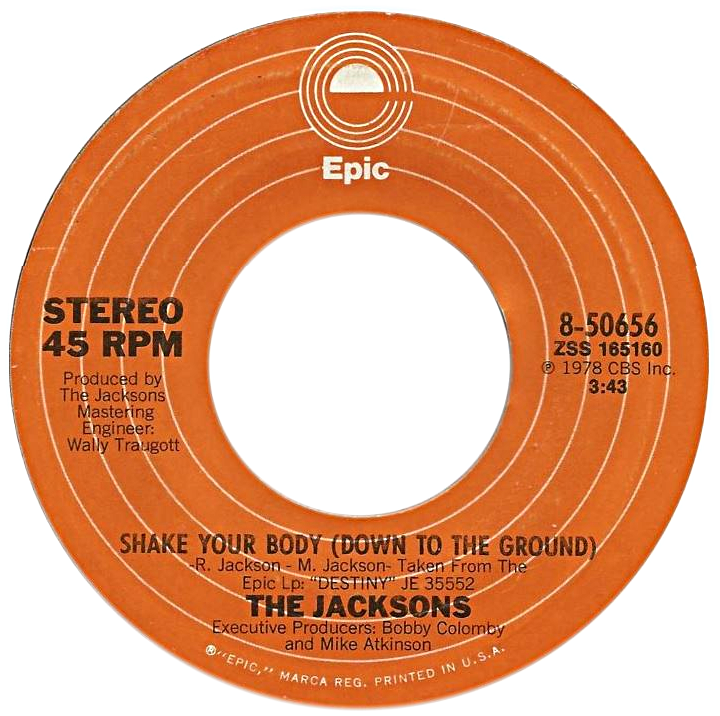
- One of A-side labels of the US 7-inch vinyl release

"Shake Your Body (Down to the Ground)" is a song recorded by the Jacksons for their 1978 album Destiny, and released as a single in early 1979. It peaked at No. 7 in the Billboard Hot 100 in May 1979.

== Background ==
The most successful of the Jacksons' recordings for Epic, "Shake Your Body" (originally demoed as "Shake a Body") was produced by the Jackson brothers, written by Michael and Randy, and featured Michael on lead vocals.

== Release ==
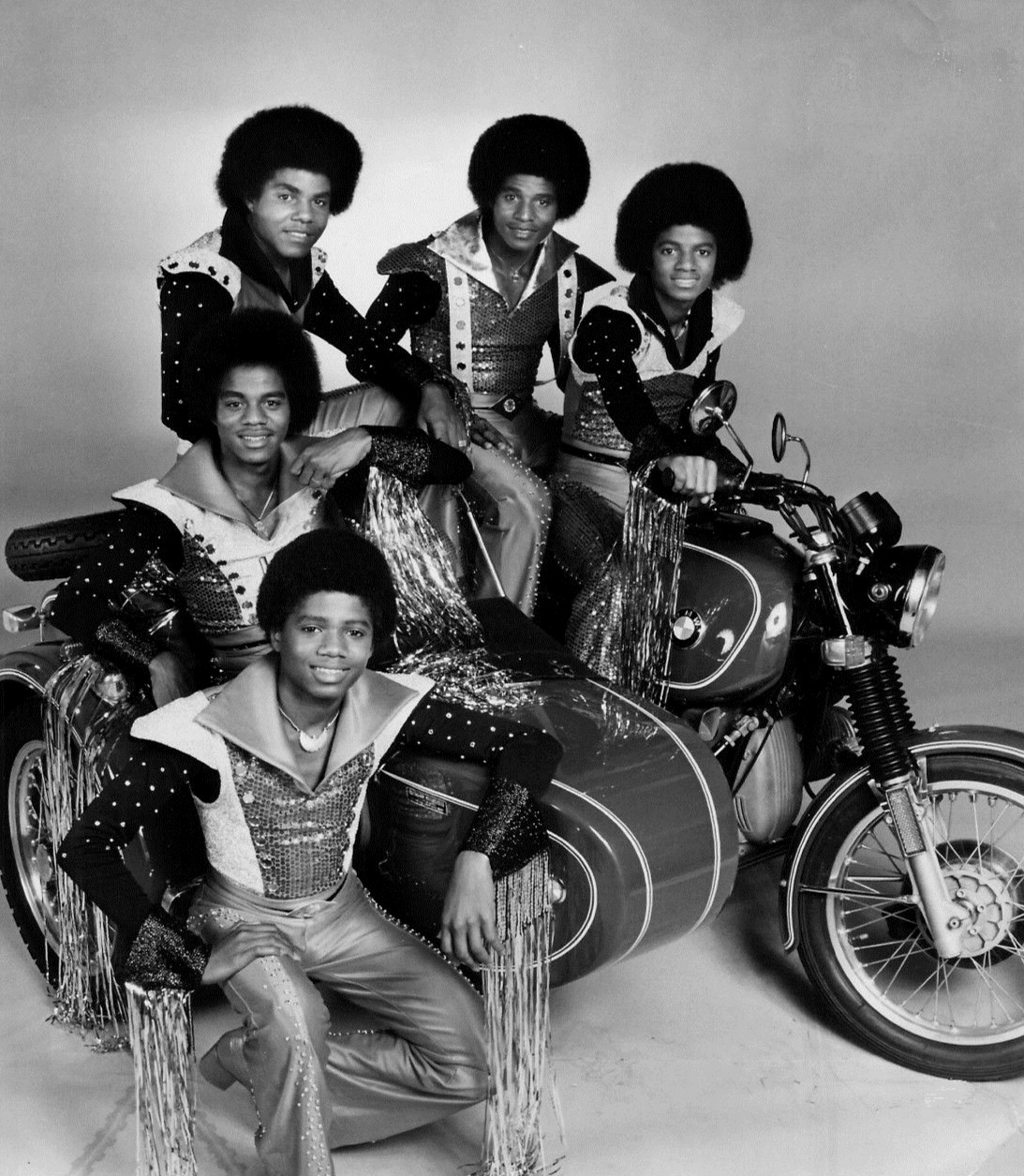
The Jacksons (1977)

Released to radio in a single edit of three minutes and forty-five seconds (and played in its full eight-minute album version by clubs), the single reached No. 3 in Cash Box magazine and peaked at no. 7 on the Billboard Hot 100 chart. It also peaked at No. 3 on the Billboard Hot Soul Singles chart. The ensuing 12" Disco Single Remix featured a more focused drum and rhythm track, as well as the new synthesizer-voiced three octave climbing glissando that was not heard on the album version. "Shake Your Body" sold over two million copies, attaining platinum status from the Recording Industry Association of America.

In the UK and Ireland, the single was a major success on the charts, peaking there likewise at No. 4 and No. 9 in 1979. In Australia the single was less successful only reaching No. 59 on the charts at that time. In New Zealand and Canada at peaked in the charts at No. 8 and No. 13.

Cash Box said it has a "rippling rhythm section, solid beat and stunning chorus" but that Michael Jackson's vocals are the "centerpiece." Record World said it has an unusual arrangement and "has a bit of gospel in the beat and features Michael Jackson's high, distinct vocals."

The B-side on the 7" was "That's What You Get (for Being Polite)" while the B-side on the 12" was "All Night Dancin'".

== Live performances ==
The first performance of "Shake Your Body (Down to the Ground)" was on the second leg of the Jacksons' Destiny Tour in 1979. Later, it was performed on the Triumph Tour in 1981. In 1984 it was performed on the Victory Tour. In 1987, it was performed on the first leg of Michael Jackson's Bad Tour. It was also performed during the Michael Jackson 30th Anniversary concerts at the Madison Square Garden in New York City in September 2001; it would be the last song performed live by the Jacksons before the death of Michael Jackson in 2009. The song was going to be performed as an instrumental interlude (merged with "Don't Stop 'Til You Get Enough") during Jackson's 2009–2010 This Is It concert series at London's O2 Arena, which was cancelled due to his sudden death. The song was remixed and released on the deluxe edition of the Michael Jackson's Immortal album.

== Charts ==
=== Weekly charts ===
Chart (1979)	Peak position
Australia (Kent Music Report)	59
Belgium (Ultratop 50 Flanders)	6
Canada Dance/Urban (RPM)	5
Canada Top Singles (RPM)	13
Ireland (IRMA)	9
Netherlands (Dutch Top 40)	3
Netherlands (Single Top 100)	3
New Zealand (Recorded Music NZ)	8
UK Singles (Official Charts)	4
US Billboard Hot 100	7
US Billboard Hot Soul Singles	3
US Cash Box	5
US Record World	3

Chart (2009)	Peak position
US Billboard Hot Digital Songs	50

=== Year-end charts ===
Chart (1979)	Rank
Belgium (Ultratop 50 Flanders)	46
Canada Top Singles (RPM)	98
Netherlands (Dutch Top 40)	34
Netherlands (Single Top 100)	19
US Billboard Hot 100	25
US Cash Box	26

== Certifications ==
Region	Certification	Certified units/sales
Canada (Music Canada)	Gold	75,000^{^}
United Kingdom (BPI)	Silver	250,000^{^}
United States (RIAA)	Platinum	2,000,000^{^}
^{^} Shipments figures based on certification alone.
