= Can You Feel It (The Jacksons song) =

Single by The Jacksons

from the album Triumph
- B-side: "Everybody"
- Released: February 13, 1981
- Recorded: March 1980
- Genre: Disco
- Length: 5:58 (album version); 3:50 (U.S. 7-inch edit); 3:59 (European 7-inch edit)
- Label: Epic; CBS
- Songwriters: Michael Jackson; Jackie Jackson
- Producer: The Jacksons

The Jacksons singles chronology
"This Place Hotel" (1980)	"Can You Feel It" (1981)	"Walk Right Now" (1981)

Music video
- "Can You Feel It" on YouTube

"Can You Feel It" is a song by American group the Jacksons, recorded in March 1980 and released as the third single from their album Triumph on February 13, 1981.

Written by brothers Michael Jackson and Jackie Jackson, the song featured solo leads by Michael and Randy Jackson. Released as a single in 1981, "Can You Feel It" peaked at number 77 on the Billboard Hot 100 and number 30 on the Billboard R&B Chart. Outside of the United States, "Can You Feel It" topped the charts in Belgium (Flanders) and South Africa, peaked within the top ten of the charts in Australia, the Netherlands, and the United Kingdom, and the top 20 of the charts in Ireland.

== Critical reception ==
Record World wrote that "Dynamic strings join Michael and Randy's vocal drama to provide memorable musical suspense."

== Personnel ==
- Written and composed by Michael Jackson and Jackie Jackson
- Produced by the Jacksons
- Lead vocals: Michael and Randy Jackson
- Arrangement by Michael and Jackie Jackson
- String arrangement by Tom Tom 84
- Keyboards: Greg Phillinganes, Ronnie Foster, Bill Wolfer (uncredited)
- Guitars: Tito Jackson, David Williams
- Bass: Nathan Watts
- Drums: Ollie E. Brown
- Vibes: Gary L. Coleman
- Background vocal coordinator and choir director: Stephanie Spruill
  - The Children's Choir: Yolanda Kenerly, Brigette Bush, Audra Tillman, Lita Aubrey, Rhonda Gentry, Roger Kenerly II, Soloman Daniels, Brian Stilwell, Gerry Gruberth, Peter Wade
  - The Adults' Choir: Stephanie Spruill, Paulette McWilliams, Bunny Hull, Carolyn Dennis, Venetta Fields, Josie James, Paulette Brown, Carmen Twillie, Lisa Roberts, Phyllis St. James, Roger Kenerly-Saint, Ronald Vann, Louis Price Gregory Wright, Arnold McCuller, Roy Galloway, Jim Gilstrap, Gerry Garrett, Bob Mack, Tyrell "Rock" Deadrick

== Charts ==
Chart (1980–1981)	Peak position
Australia (Kent Music Report)	10
Belgium (Ultratop 50 Flanders)	1
Irish Singles Chart	12
Netherlands (Dutch Top 40)	2
Netherlands (Single Top 100)	3
South African Chart	1
UK (Official Charts Company)	6
US Billboard Hot 100	77
US Dance Club Songs (Billboard)	1
US Hot R&B/Hip-Hop Songs (Billboard)	30

Chart (2009)	Peak position
Australia (ARIA)	41
Netherlands (Single Top 100)	44
UK (Official Charts Company)	59

== Certifications ==
Region	Certification	Certified units/sales
United Kingdom (BPI)	Silver	250,000^{^}
^{^} Shipments figures based on certification alone.

== Music video ==
The 9-minute accompanying video, entitled "The Triumph", was noted for its special effects created by Robert Abel and Associates, the team that worked on the 1982 film Tron. In 2001, it was voted one of the 100 best videos of all time, in a poll to mark the 20th anniversary of MTV. The title was also used for a 2009 greatest hits compilation. The video was featured on the bonus disc of the box set, Michael Jackson's Vision.

Billboard said it was "a cinematic masterpiece with strikingly advanced visual effects for its time." Rolling Stone placed it at number 12 on their list of the best Michael Jackson videos.

=== Personnel ===
- Prelude narration spoken by Ken Nordine
- Developed by Robert Abel
- Directed by Michael Gibson
- Technical director: John Grower
- Director of photography: Laszlo Kovacs
- Editor: Kathryn Campbell
- Production artist: Michael Sterling

== In popular culture ==
The track was sampled by The Tamperer featuring Maya for their 1998 hit single "Feel It".

A cover version of the song appeared in a 2018 holiday advertising campaign for Amazon.com.
