= Randy Jackson (Jacksons singer) =

American singer (born 1961)

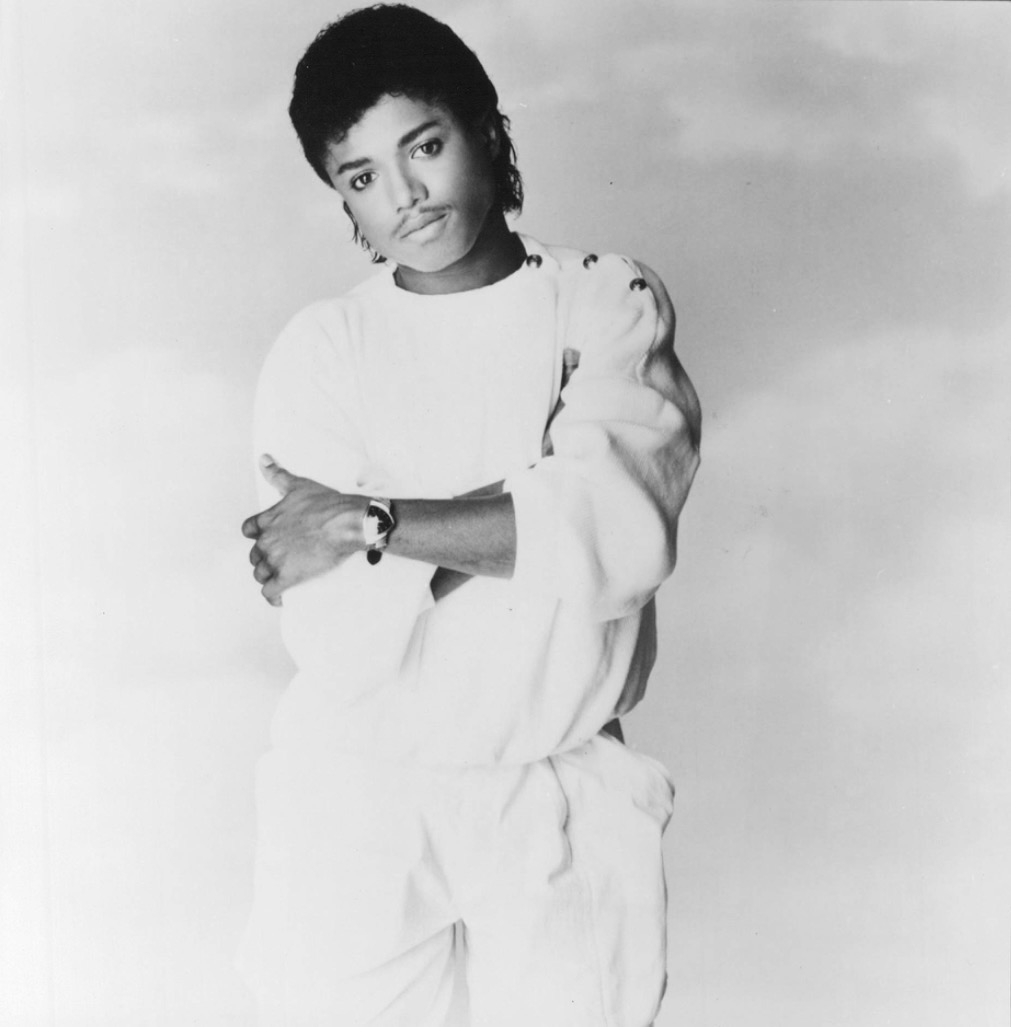
- Jackson in 1984
- Born: Steven Randall Jackson; October 29, 1961 (age 65); Gary, Indiana, U.S.
- Occupations: Musician; singer; songwriter; dancer
- Years active: 1971–present
- Spouse: Eliza Shaffy (m. 1989; div. 1992)
- Partner: Alejandra Oaziaza (1986–1994)
- Children: 3
- Parents: Joe Jackson (father); Katherine Jackson (mother)
- Family: Jackson
- Musical career
- Genres: Pop; R&B; soul
- Instruments: Vocals; percussion; keyboards; bass; guitar
- Labels: Epic; CBS; A&M
- Formerly of: The Jacksons

Steven Randall Jackson (born October 29, 1961) is an American singer and songwriter. He is the ninth child and youngest son in the Jackson family. Randy is the youngest Jackson brother and the second-youngest Jackson sibling before his sister Janet. Randy is a former member of his family band the Jacksons, which he joined after his brother Jermaine left the group (then named the Jackson 5). He was nominated for the Grammy Award for Best R&B Performance by a Duo or Group with Vocal for his work on the 1980 studio album Triumph at the 23rd Annual Grammy Awards.

== Early life ==
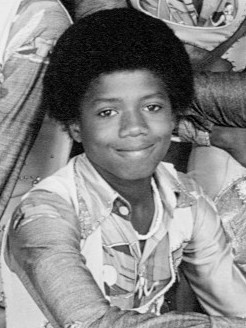
Jackson in 1976

Steven Randall Jackson was born on October 29, 1961, at St Mary's Mercy Hospital in Gary, Indiana, to Joseph Jackson and Katherine Jackson. Nicknamed "Little Randy", he is the ninth child of the Jackson family, after Rebbie, Jackie, Tito, Jermaine, La Toya, Marlon, Brandon (Marlon's twin, who died shortly after birth), and Michael, and he is the youngest of the brothers. His sister Janet was born in 1966. Because he was only three years old when the Jackson 5 was formed in 1965, he was not an original member of the group.

== Career ==
=== The Jacksons ===
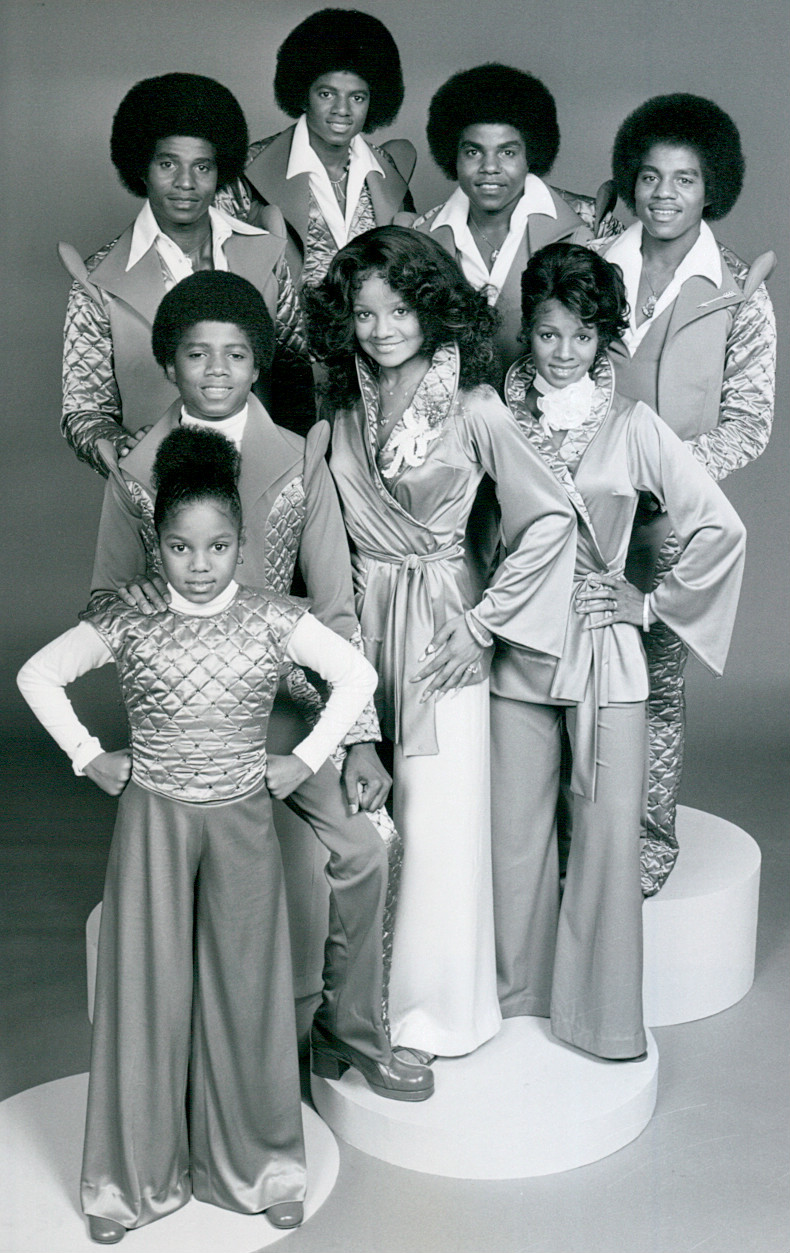
From left, back row: Jackie Jackson, Michael Jackson, Tito Jackson, Marlon Jackson. Middle row: Randy Jackson, La Toya Jackson, Rebbie Jackson. Front row: Janet Jackson, 1977. Absent: Jermaine Jackson

Randy Jackson first appeared live with his brothers in 1971 at a Christmas show the Jackson 5 held for blind children. Although he was on every Jackson 5 tour since 1972, mainly playing the congas among other instruments, Randy did not officially join the family band until 1975 when they left Motown for CBS Records and older brother Jermaine chose to stay with Motown, prompting Jackson to replace him. The Jackson 5 officially changed their name to the Jacksons when they signed with Epic in part because Motown owned the name Jackson 5. At age 16, he co-wrote the Jacksons' most successful single on Epic, "Shake Your Body (Down to the Ground)" with Michael, for the group's 1978 album Destiny.

== Cancelled album (How Can I Be Sure) ==
In 1977, he signed a contract with Epic Records to make his first solo album, which was going to be titled "How Can I Be Sure". The album was cancelled at the last minute because they had to prioritize The Jacksons' album "Destiny" and also to avoid competing with Michael Jackson's upcoming album (produced by Quincy Jones), at that time, "Off The Wall".

== Single ==
Shortly before the release of his full album in late 1978/early 1979, he released a 7-inch single. The A-side featured the title track, "How Can I Be Sure," and the B-side, "Love Song For Kids," was a collaboration with Janet Jackson. (The single was released in the fall of 1978.)

Randy performed the title track on the legendary television program Soul Train that same year (without his brothers accompanying him; he was alone on stage), and Don Cornelius (the show's host) interviewed Randy (who was a teenager at the time).

The title track had little impact because Epic Records barely promoted it (they printed a much smaller run compared to the group's other releases, printed posters to promote it, and sent the single to radio stations). It didn't chart on Billboard, and when The Jacksons' album "Destiny" was released, the single was completely overshadowed by the album's huge success.

The single hasn't been reissued since its 1978 release (although the title track has been included on several compilations over the years, such as Free Soul Lovers in the mid-90s, Rare Sweet Soul 29 in 2000, and Modern Soul in 2019).

== Car accident ==
On March 3, 1980, Jackson was seriously injured in a car crash in Hollywood, California. In June 1980, he appeared on the cover of the weekly African-American news magazine Jet. The cover headline read: "Randy Jackson Walks Again: Talks About His Future."

Jackson plays congas, percussion, keyboards, piano, bass, and guitar, among other instruments. In addition to singing and playing on the Jacksons' recordings, he worked with Michael on his album Off the Wall. Randy shared lead vocals with Michael on the hit single Can You Feel It from the album Triumph, singing the verses. He participated in the Jacksons' Destiny World Tour from 1979 to 1980, the Triumph Tour in 1981, Victory Tour in 1984 and the band's later projects. After the Victory Tour, Jackson worked with Lionel Richie on his album Dancing on the Ceiling in 1985. Jackson, along with brothers Jackie, Tito, Marlon and his sister La Toya joined USA For Africa to sing in "We Are the World" for the charity album of the same name, which was led by Jackson's brother Michael, Lionel Richie, Quincy Jones and Harry Belafonte.

Randy Jackson was left out when the Jackson 5 were inducted to the Rock and Roll Hall of Fame in 1997; only the five original members were inducted. He was part of the Jacksons' 2001 reunion at Madison Square Garden during the Michael Jackson: 30th Anniversary Celebration concerts but did not appear as an official cast member in their 2009 A&E reality series The Jacksons: A Family Dynasty. He did contribute backing vocals with Jackie, Tito, Marlon and Jermaine for Michael's "This Is It" for the 2009 posthumous album Michael Jackson's This Is It. Jackson was portrayed by Robert Redcross and Nicolas Phillips in the 1992 miniseries The Jacksons: An American Dream.

=== After the Jacksons ===
After recording 2300 Jackson Street, the group disbanded and focused on separate projects in 1990. After this split, Jackson formed his band, Randy & the Gypsys. The group released only one self-titled album before breaking up. The same year, he co-founded Total Multimedia Inc. with former Iron Butterfly bass player Philip Taylor Kramer to develop data compression techniques for CD-ROMs. On June 28, 1998, Jackson opened up his record label, Modern Records.

=== Rhythm Nation Records ===
Jackson is currently a partner with his sister, Janet Jackson, at her independent record label Rhythm Nation Records. The label has only released a handful of recordings, all by Janet. The Unbreakable album came out in 2015 along with a few accompanying singles. As of 2026, this is her most recent album.

On August 16, 2018, Randy and Janet announced that Rhythm Nation Records was partnering with an independent music publisher, distributor and label Cinq Music Group. On August 17, 2018, the label released Janet Jackson's one-off non-album single "Made for Now" (featuring Daddy Yankee), on which Randy got a co-writing credit, alongside Janet herself and a half-dozen other contributors.

== Personal life ==
=== Family ===
In the 1980s, Jackson dated Bernadette Swann (née Robi), Lynn Swann's ex-wife. Swann alleged that Jackson was physically abusive, so she sought refuge at the home of her friend Tina Turner (Swann previously dated Turner's son Craig). Turner shot at Jackson after he broke into her home to see Swann. Turner decided not to press charges in order to avoid bad press.

In 1986, Jackson met Alejandra Oaziaza. They dated for several years, and have two children together, born in 1989 and 1992. Oaziaza later married and divorced Randy Jackson's brother Jermaine Jackson. Randy Jackson married Eliza Shaffy in August 1989; they divorced in 1992. They have one daughter together born in 1990.

=== Michael Jackson's memorial ===
Michael Jackson's memorial service was held at the Staples Center on Tuesday, July 7, 2009. To honor him, Jackson and his brothers Marlon, Jackie, Jermaine and Tito served as pallbearers with each wearing a single spangled white glove and sunglasses.

== Legal issues ==
=== Battery charge ===
In January 1991, Jackson was charged with battery for beating his wife Eliza Shaffy and their 7-month-old daughter Stevanna. He pleaded no contest to the charge, was placed on two years' probation and ordered to enroll in a domestic violence program, but did not comply. In November 1991, Jackson was arrested after Shaffy phoned the police to report that the beatings did not stop. He was sentenced to 30 days in a mental hospital, Pine Grove Hospital, in Canoga Park and ordered to serve the remainder of his probation and enroll in a year-long domestic violence rehabilitation program. Disappointed that Jackson received no jail time, Shaffy filed for divorce.

=== Bankruptcy ===
Jackson filed for bankruptcy in 1996. He was ordered to surrender his shares in Modern Records Inc. In May 1998, an arrest warrant was issued when Jackson failed to turn over the stock. In 2001, he pleaded guilty to bankruptcy fraud by failing to list all his vehicular assets.

=== Child support ===
In January 2012, Jackson filed a complaint against Alejandra Oaziaza (also known as Loaiza), disputing an alleged $500,000 owed in child support. He claimed he had never been served for the initial paternity lawsuit, instead claiming that the matter had been settled in 1993. His absence at the paternity proceedings resulted in a default judgment in Loaiza's favor.

=== Disputed will and child custody ===
Randy attempted to unseat executors John Branca and John McClain and dismiss the will of his brother Michael, which reportedly made their mother Katherine furious. He, Jermaine and Janet objected to Michael Forever – The Tribute Concert held in 2011 for Michael, stating that they felt the family's attention should have been focused on Conrad Murray's trial.

The three siblings were later involved in an event where Katherine lost custody of Michael's children due to suspicion that she was "prevented from acting as a guardian because of the acts of third parties". Jackson, Jermaine and Janet attempted to take the children with them to Arizona, where it was alleged that Katherine was being held against her will after being kidnapped. Footage of the event appeared to show the siblings storming the house and Janet trying to take Michael's daughter Paris' phone. Sheriff's deputies broke up an altercation between Randy, Jermaine and Trent (Katherine's nephew-in-law and paternal cousin of Randy and Jermaine). In the end, the court ordered that Katherine would share custody of Prince, Paris and Bigi ("Blanket") with their cousin, TJ Jackson, the then 34-year-old son of Tito Jackson.

== Discography ==
=== Singles ===
Title	Year
"How Can I Be Sure / Love Song For Kids"	1978

=== with Randy and the Gypsys ===
==== Studio albums ====
Title	Album details
Randy & the Gypsys	Released: October 4, 1989; Formats: LP, CD, cassette; Label: A&M

==== Singles ====
Title	Year	Album
"Perpetrators"	1989	Randy & the Gypsys
"Love You Honey"	1989	Randy & the Gypsys

==== Promotional singles ====
Title	Year	Album
"The Love We Almost Had"	1989	Randy & the Gypsys
