= The Love You Save =

1970 single by the Jackson 5

- Netherlands 7" vinyl cover

Single by the Jackson 5

from the album ABC
- B-side: "I Found That Girl"
- Released: May 13, 1970
- Recorded: March 1970
- Studio: Hitsville West, (Los Angeles)
- Genre: Bubblegum-soul
- Length: 3:00
- Label: Motown
- Songwriter: The Corporation
- Producer: The Corporation

The Jackson 5 singles chronology
"ABC" (1970)	"The Love You Save" (1970)	"I'll Be There" (1970)

Alternative release(s)
- Solid center variant of the UK single

"The Love You Save" is a song recorded by the Jackson 5 for Motown Records. It was released as a single on May 13, 1970, and held the number-one spot on the soul singles chart in the US for six weeks and the number-one position on the Billboard Hot 100 singles chart for two weeks, from June 27 to July 4, 1970 and sold over 2 million copies in the United States. In the UK top 40 chart, it peaked at number 7 in August 1970. The song is the third of the four-in-a-row Jackson 5 number-ones released (the others were "I Want You Back", "ABC" and "I'll Be There"). Billboard ranked the record as the No. 16 song of 1970, one place behind the Jackson 5's "ABC".

== Description ==
"The Love You Save" features side vocals of Jermaine Jackson singing alongside Michael in the final "Stop! The love you save may be your own", beside Marlon, Tito and Jackie. The song's lyrics feature Michael and Jermaine warning a "fast" girl to slow down and "stop!", because "the love you save may be your own!" The lyrics are also unusual because of the historical references—according to the song, the girl in question was under the apple tree with "Isaac" (a reference to Isaac Newton); felt electricity with "Benjie" (a reference to Benjamin Franklin); "Alexander" (a reference to Alexander Graham Bell) called her and "rang her chimes"; and "Christopher" (a reference to Christopher Columbus) "discovered" that she was "way too ahead of her time".

Bobby Taylor, who produced the Jackson 5's first album at Motown and was a lead singer of Bobby Taylor & the Vancouvers, discovered the Jackson 5 and brought them to Berry Gordy's attention. Taylor had shepherded them through their first couple of hits in L.A., but Gordy (according to Taylor) felt the material was too adult given the age of the performers, and like the remainder of the early Jackson 5 hits, "The Love You Save" was written and produced back in Detroit by the Corporation, a team comprising Motown chief Berry Gordy, Freddie Perren, Alphonzo Mizell, and Deke Richards, and recorded in Los Angeles, away from the old Motown studio at Hitsville USA in Detroit, Michigan.

"The Love You Save" was the second single from the second Jackson 5 album, ABC. Record World called it "another big one."

The song was covered by 90s American pop rock band Hanson on their demo album, Boomerang.

This song was remixed by DJ Cassidy for the 2009 release The Remix Suite.

== Personnel ==
- Lead vocals by Michael Jackson and Jermaine Jackson
- Background vocals by Michael Jackson, Jermaine Jackson, Marlon Jackson, Tito Jackson and Jackie Jackson
- Instrumentation by Los Angeles area session musicians
  - Freddie Perren – keyboards
  - David T. Walker – guitar
  - Louis Shelton – guitar
  - Don Peake – guitar
  - Wilton Felder – bass guitar
  - Gene Pello – drums

== Charts ==
=== Weekly charts ===
Chart (1970)	Peak position
Australia Kent Music Report	59
Canada RPM Top Singles	8
UK Singles Chart	7
US Billboard Hot 100	1
US R&B (Billboard)	1
US Cash Box Top 100	1

=== Year-end charts ===
Chart (1970)	Position
US Billboard Hot 100	16
US Cash Box Top 100	12

== Sales ==
Region	Certification	Certified units/sales
United States	—	2,000,000

== See also ==
- "Stop! In the Name of Love"
