= The Essential Jacksons =

Greatest hits album by The Jacksons
- Released: March 9, 2004
- Recorded: 1976–1989
- Length: 72:11
- Label: Legacy; Epic

The Jacksons chronology
20th Century Masters – The Millennium Collection: The Best of The Jackson 5 (1999)	The Essential Jacksons (2004)	The Very Best of The Jacksons (2004)

Professional ratings
Review scores
Source	Rating
AllMusic	4/5 stars

The Essential Jacksons is the first compilation to cover The Jacksons' fourteen-year-long tenure at CBS/Epic Records. Released on March 9, 2004 by Epic and Legacy Recordings, this compilation includes hits such as "Enjoy Yourself", "Shake Your Body (Down to the Ground)", "Can You Feel It", and "State of Shock".

== Track listing ==
No.	Title	Writer(s)	Originally from	Length
1.	"Enjoy Yourself" (alternate version)	Kenneth Gamble, Leon Huff, Michael Jackson	The Jacksons (1976)	3:39
2.	"Show You the Way to Go"	Kenny Gamble, Leon Huff	The Jacksons	5:26
3.	"Goin' Places"	Kenny Gamble, Leon Huff	Goin' Places (1977)	4:28
4.	"Find Me a Girl"	Kenny Gamble, Leon Huff	Goin' Places	4:32
5.	"Blame It on the Boogie"	Mick Jackson, David Jackson, Elmar Krohn	Destiny (1978)	3:30
6.	"Shake Your Body (Down to the Ground)"	Michael Jackson, Randy Jackson	Destiny	7:57
7.	"Lovely One"	Michael Jackson, Randy Jackson	Triumph (1980)	4:49
8.	"This Place Hotel" (originally "Heartbreak Hotel")	Michael Jackson	Triumph	5:43
9.	"Can You Feel It"	Michael Jackson, Jackie Jackson	Triumph	5:58
10.	"Walk Right Now"	Michael Jackson, Jackie Jackson, Randy Jackson	Triumph	6:26
11.	"State of Shock" (featuring Mick Jagger)	Michael Jackson, Randy Hansen	Victory (1984)	4:30
12.	"2300 Jackson Street"	Jermaine Jackson, Jackie Jackson, Tito Jackson, Randall Jackson, Gene Griffin	2300 Jackson Street (1989)	5:05
13.	"Nothin' (That Compares 2 U)"	L.A. Reid, Babyface	2300 Jackson Street	5:24
14.	"Don't Stop 'Til You Get Enough" (live)	Michael Jackson	The Jacksons Live! (1981)	4:44
Total length:				72:11

== Charts ==
Chart (2009)	Peak position
Australian Albums (ARIA)	78
