= Victory Tour (The Jacksons) =

1984 concert tour by the Jacksons

- Tour by the Jacksons
- Location: North America
- Associated albums: Victory; Jermaine Jackson; Thriller
- Start date: July 6, 1984
- End date: December 9, 1984
- No. of shows: 55
- Attendance: 2.5 million
- Box office: US$75 million ($232 million in 2025 dollars)

The Jacksons tour chronology
- Triumph Tour (1981); Victory Tour (1984); Unity Tour (2012–2013)
Michael Jackson tour chronology
Triumph Tour (1981)	Victory Tour (1984)	Bad (1987–1989)

The Victory Tour was a concert tour by the Jacksons, from July to December 1984. It was the only tour with all six Jackson brothers, although Jackie was injured for some of it. The group performed 55 concerts to an audience of approximately 2.5 million. Of the 55 locations performed at, 53 were large stadiums. Most came to see Michael, whose album Thriller was dominating the music world at the time. Many regard it as a tour for Thriller, with most of the songs on the set list coming from Michael's albums Thriller and Off the Wall. The tour reportedly grossed approximately $75 million ($232 million in 2025 dollars) and set a new record for the highest-grossing tour. It showcased Michael's single decorated glove, black sequined jacket, and moonwalk. The tour was choreographed by Paula Abdul, and promoted by Don King. Although it was billed as a "world tour", all shows were staged in the United States and Canada.

Despite its focus on Michael, the tour was named after the Jacksons' album Victory. The album was released four days before the tour's first show in Kansas City and turned out to be a commercial success. However, besides some ad libbing during the show's encore, none of the album's songs were performed on the tour. Jermaine had a successful new album out as well (Jermaine Jackson, also known as Dynamite, which had been released in April 1984) and some material from that album was performed. According to Marlon, Michael refused to rehearse or perform any of the songs from Victory and was also reluctant on embarking on the tour himself; it took his mother Katherine and fans to persuade him before he finally agreed. Marlon also stated that Michael had only reluctantly joined his brothers, who needed the income while he himself did not. On the tour, tensions between Michael and his brothers increased so much that at the December 9 concert he announced that it would be the last time they would perform together, ending plans for a European and Australian leg of the tour in the spring and summer of 1985.

The Jacksons and Don King still made money from the tour. Michael donated his share to several charities as he had promised prior to the tour, but the rancor between him and his brothers had a deep and lasting effect on the Jacksons as a family, alienating him from them for most of his later life, and effectively ended the Jacksons as a performing group. The Jacksons made one more album in 1989, but Michael and Marlon only participated in one song on it, and aside from the concert celebrating Michael's thirty years as a solo artist in 2001, they never toured again during Michael's lifetime. The tour was also a financial disaster for promoter Chuck Sullivan and his father Billy; the losses from the tour eventually forced them to sell the New England Patriots football team they owned after Foxboro Stadium, the team's home field, lapsed into bankruptcy.

== Background ==
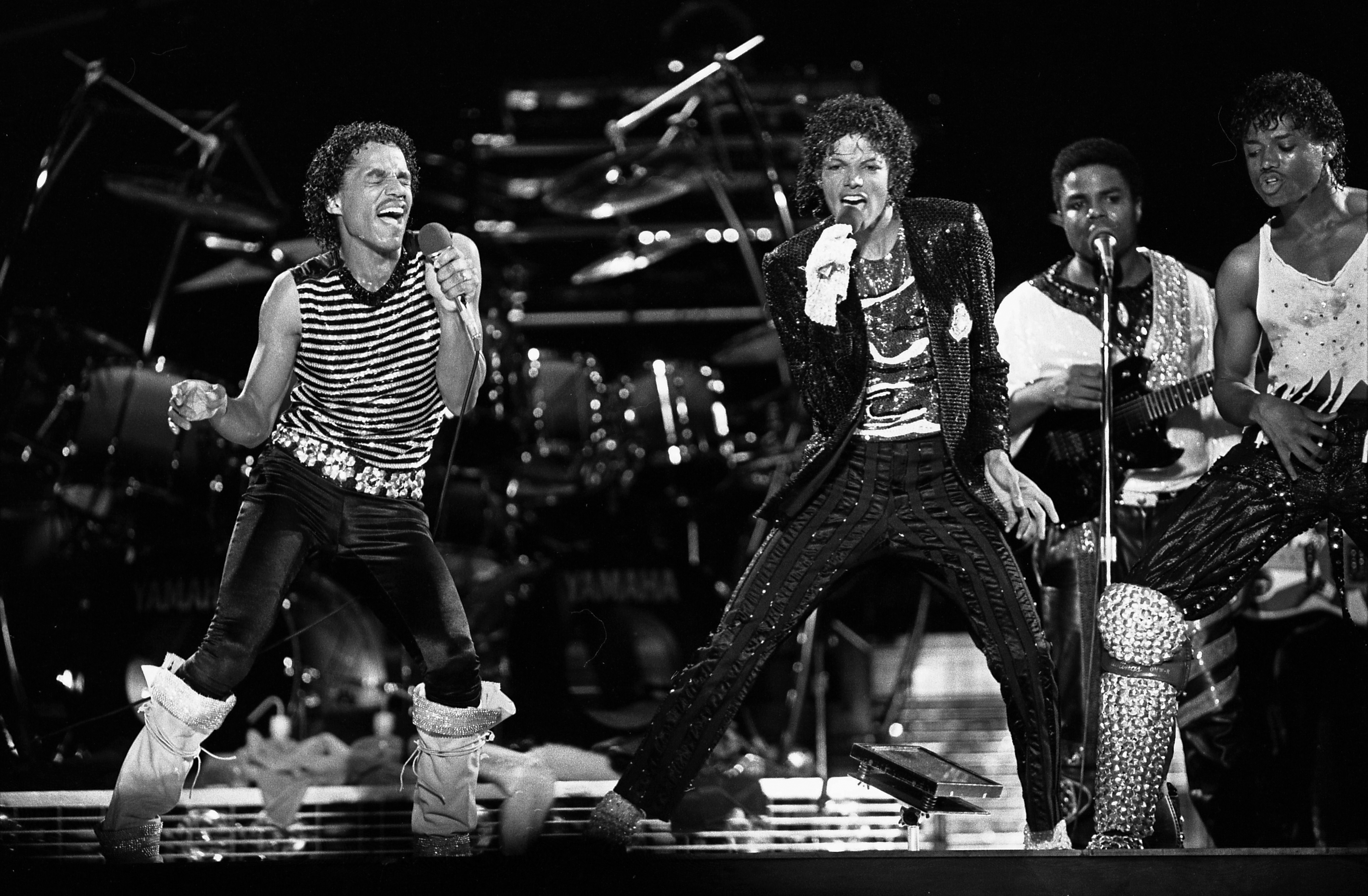
The Jacksons on stage at Arrowhead Stadium

In November 1983, the Jacksons announced plans for a major tour in 1984 at a press conference, with boxing promoter Don King offering $3 million ($9.3 million in 2025 dollars) in upfront advances. That spring, the Victory album had been recorded, to be released shortly before the tour itself.

At the time the tour was announced, the Jacksons had not lined up a promoter for the shows. In the spring of 1984, Chuck Sullivan, son of Billy Sullivan, owner of the New England Patriots of the National Football League (NFL), went to Los Angeles to see if he could get the Jacksons to choose the team's home, Foxboro Stadium, which the family also owned, for the group's Boston-area shows. After using his financial and legal expertise to help his father regain control of the team he had founded and built in the wake of a 1974 boardroom coup, the younger Sullivan, who had promoted concerts as an undergraduate at Boston College and during his United States Army service in Thailand, had begun staging concerts at the stadium to generate extra income for the team.

The set list included songs from the Jacksons' albums Destiny and Triumph. Despite the name of the tour, the Victory album was not represented. There were also songs on the list from Jermaine's and Michael's solo careers. Songs from Michael's albums Off the Wall and Thriller were both represented. The set list did not include "Thriller" itself because Michael did not like the way the song sounded live, but it was later performed regularly during Michael's solo tours. "State of Shock" was also rehearsed during a soundcheck but was never performed (although a snippet of Michael's vocal can be heard in leaked footage of the concert in Toronto). Jermaine sometimes performed the song "Dynamite" during his solo segment in place of the usual "You Like Me, Don't You?".

== Planning and organization ==
At a meeting, Frank DiLeo, a vice president of the Jacksons' label, Epic Records, told Sullivan that the group's talks with its original promoter had broken down and they were seeking a replacement. Sensing an opportunity, Sullivan returned to Boston and began putting together the financing to allow Stadium Management Corp. (SMC), the Patriots' subsidiary that operated Foxboro Stadium, to promote the entire Victory Tour. Initially he partnered with Eddie DeBartolo, then-owner of another NFL team, the San Francisco 49ers, in putting together a bid offering the Jacksons two-thirds of the tour's gross revenue against a guaranteed $40 million ($124 million in modern dollars).

DeBartolo withdrew from the bid when he began to see the deal as too risky. Sullivan persevered by himself, and in late April DiLeo told him at another meeting in Los Angeles that SMC, which had never handled a tour, would be the promoter of the year's most eagerly anticipated concert tour, expected to gross $70–80 million. The deal was very generous to the Jacksons. Sullivan had agreed that they would receive 83.4% of gross potential ticket revenues, which meant in practical terms that the group would be paid as if the show had sold out regardless of whether it actually did. That percentage was at least 25 points above what was at that time the industry standard for artists on tour.

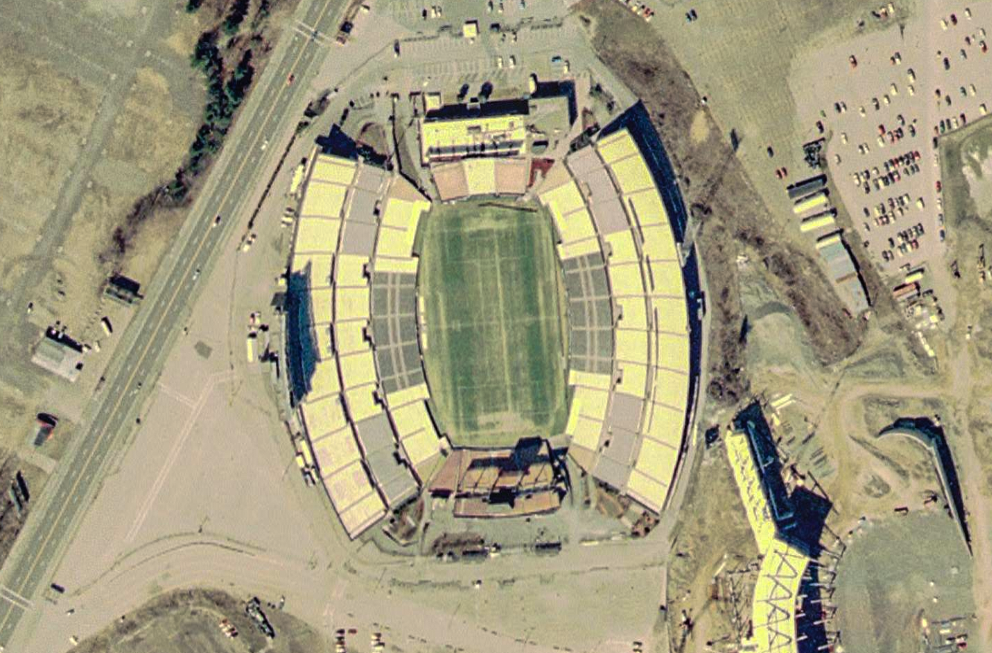
Foxboro Stadium, used as collateral to finance the tour, as seen shortly before its demolition in the early 2000s

Sullivan also guaranteed the Jacksons an advance of $36.6 million ($113 million in modern dollars). He put Foxboro Stadium up as collateral for a $12.5 million loan to pay the first installment shortly before the tour started. The balance was due two weeks later.

The month after winning the tour bid, Sullivan approached stadium managers at the NFL's meetings, many of whom were there to bid for future Super Bowls. He sought changes to their usual arrangements with touring performers in order to make the Victory Tour more profitable. Kansas City's Arrowhead Stadium, home of the Chiefs, agreed to accept only a $100,000 fee for the three opening concerts instead of its usual percentage of ticket sales and concessions. The Gator Bowl in Jacksonville, Florida, provided nearly half a million dollars' worth of free goods and services. Ultimately, 26 of the 55 dates were played in 17 stadiums that were home to NFL teams. But some others balked at Sullivan's demands. To use John F. Kennedy Stadium, Sullivan asked the city of Philadelphia for almost $400,000 in tax breaks and subsidies. Among them were free hotel rooms and suites for all tour workers, free use of the stadium and waiver of concession revenue. He said the Jacksons' presence would generate revenue that would make up the difference, but the city stood firm on some provisions.

Outside of negotiations, Sullivan's behavior on tour embarrassed the Jacksons on some occasions. At Washington's Robert F. Kennedy Stadium, he forgot his pass and was denied entry. Sullivan was particularly humiliated when the board of selectmen in Foxboro, Massachusetts, where his family's team and stadium were located, uncharacteristically denied a permit for the concert, citing "the unknown element". This was not only a major personal embarrassment for Sullivan, but also a crippling financial blow as it denied the family the use of the only facility where they would have kept all of the revenue from sources such as concessions and parking.

News writers suggested in retrospect that the board's decision was racially motivated. It was also stated that there had been continuing security concerns about the stadium during Patriots' games and previous concerts, but the board had never denied permits on that basis before. Others pointed the possibility of lobbying from the Sullivans' business rivals, since the family had accumulated many enemies in the state of Massachusetts over years of often bitter struggle to keep control of the Patriots. In any case, Sullivan was acutely aware that staging any sort of large event in Massachusetts at the time was considered a privilege utterly dependent on the goodwill of the board of selectmen, and thus was in no position to antagonize them further by challenging their decision.

To help defray the tour's costs, the Jacksons sought a corporate sponsor. They had all but concluded a lucrative deal with Quaker Oats when King came to them with a deal he had already signed with Pepsi. Although it would pay them less money, the brothers were acutely aware that King was able and willing to shut down the entire tour if he were crossed. They thus had no choice but to take the deal with Pepsi and break off talks with Quaker.

Part of the deal arranged by King was that Michael, who did not drink Pepsi, would have to do two television commercials. He made sure that his face appeared minimally in them to avoid overexposing his image, much to King's annoyance. During filming of one of the two commercials, Michael suffered second and third degree burns on his scalp when a pyrotechnic effect malfunctioned, catching his hair on fire. Many people, including friends and associates of Michael, believe this incident is what sparked his later problems with prescription drug abuse.

== Ticket controversy and other business issues ==
King, Sullivan and the Jacksons' father, Joe Jackson (who no longer managed any of his sons by that point), came up with a way to generate additional revenue from ticket sales. Those wishing to attend would have to send a postal money order for $120 ($370 in 2026 dollars) along with a special form to a lottery to buy blocks of four tickets at $30 apiece (US$93 in 2025 dollars), ostensibly to curtail scalpers. Upon receipt the money was to be deposited into a standard money market account earning 7% annual interest; it would take six to eight weeks for the lottery to be held and money to be refunded to the unsuccessful purchasers. Since only one in ten purchasers would win the lottery and receive tickets, there would be more money in the bank for that time period than there were tickets to sell, and they expected to earn $10–12 million in interest.

Joe, Jermaine, Marlon, Jackie, Tito and Randy were in favor of the plan, but Michael was not and warned them that it would be a public relations disaster. The $30 ticket price was already higher than most touring acts (such as Prince and Bruce Springsteen) charged at the time and was compounded by the requirement to buy four. This put tickets out of reach of many of Michael's African-American fans who were not financially secure. That community was joined by many commentators in the media in vociferously criticizing the Jacksons over the plan. Nevertheless, when newspapers published the form for tickets to the first show in Kansas City in late June, fans lined up at stores before they opened to buy them. A local radio disk jockey said some newspapers were even stolen from lawns.

The ticket price remained unchanged. At a press conference, King justified the $30 price as appropriate and stated that he did not blame the promoters for charging that price, adding that "you must understand, you get what you pay for."

=== Financial difficulties ===
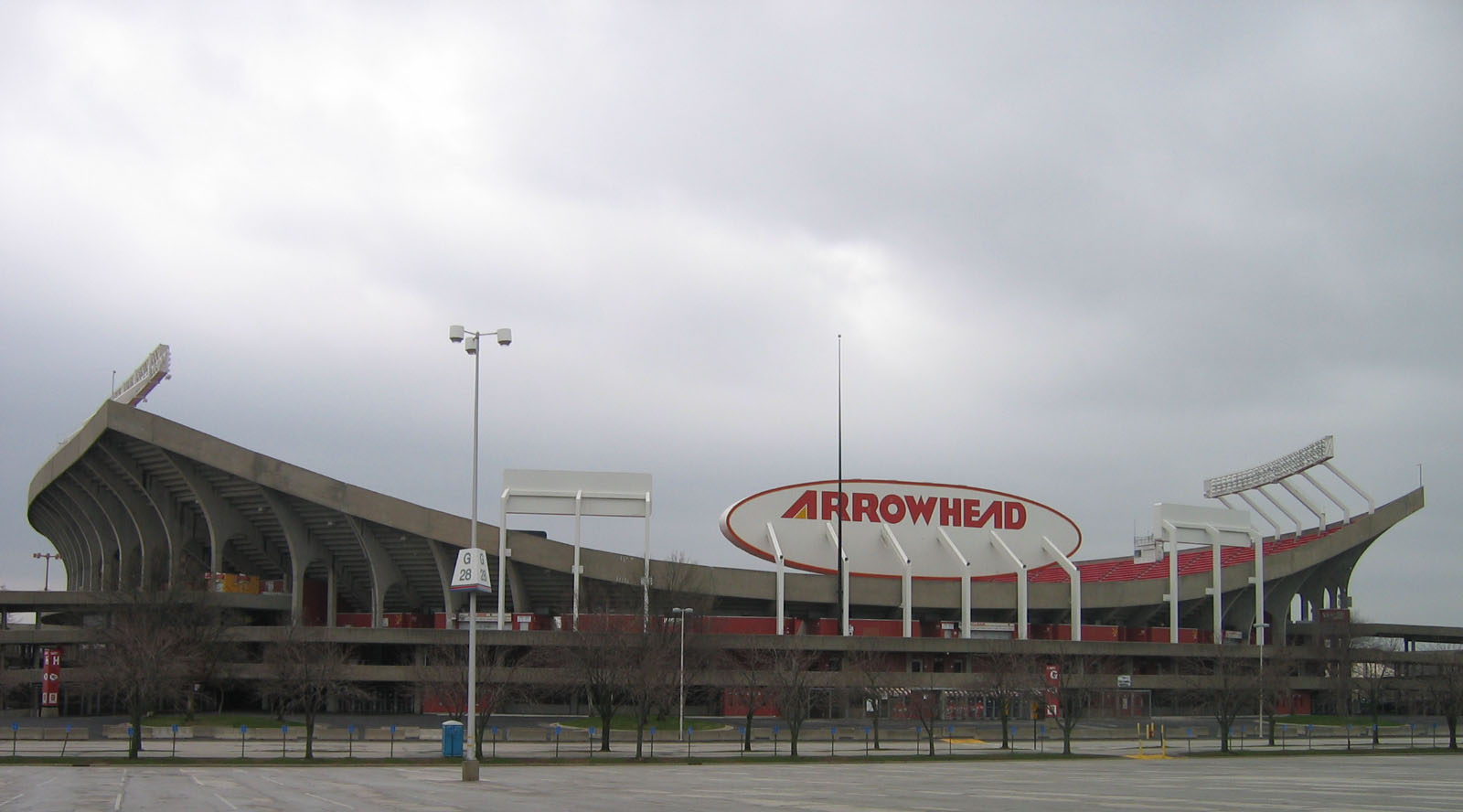
Arrowhead Stadium, where the tour opened, as it appeared at the time

The tour sold what was then a record number of tickets despite the high price. The opening shows were widely covered in the national media and sold out. "Anybody who sees this show will be a better person for years to come", King told the media before the first date in Kansas City. "Michael Jackson has transcended all earthly bounds. Every race, color and creed is waiting for this tour."

Sullivan had estimated in June that he would make up to $13 million, but by August he had reduced that estimate by more than three-quarters, to $3 million. Transporting the 365-ton (331 t) stage Michael had designed, which took up one-third of a football field (approximately 19,200 square feet (1,780 m^{2})), required over thirty tractor trailers. It was so large it required using some of the seating area, in some venues taking as much as a quarter of the potential available seats off the market.

Before the tour began Sullivan had spent nearly a million dollars on legal fees and insurance. Among the 250 workers on the tour payroll was an "ambiance director" who provided "homey touches" to the traveling parlor the group relaxed in before and after shows. Overhead costs were soon averaging around a million dollars a week, far over expectations, and Sullivan was unable to pay the $24 million balance on the advance. He renegotiated the deal down to 75% of gross potential seat revenues soon after the tour began.

=== Jackson family tensions ===
Tensions between Michael and his brothers increased during the tour. Michael stayed at his own hotels and flew between stops on a private jet while the rest of the family flew commercial. At one point he demanded that a publicist be fired and, when he found out right before a show that she had not been, he refused to go on until she was. Michael was also disappointed that his idol James Brown had declined his invitation to join the group on stage at Madison Square Garden in New York City due to Brown's continued outrage about the ticket lottery.

Before the tour was halfway completed, the brothers were taking separate vehicles to concerts, staying on different floors of their hotels and refusing to talk to each other on the way to shows. Meetings broke down among factions, with two lawyers frequently representing Michael's interests, another Jermaine's, and one more for Jackie, Tito and Marlon. "It was the worst experience Michael had ever had with his brothers", said a longtime family friend. "Some were jealous, there was denial, the whole gamut of human emotions."

=== Other problems ===
Health problems affected the tour. Jackie missed the first half with a leg injury, supposedly sustained during rehearsals. At one point, Michael became so exhausted from the stress of quarreling with his brothers that he was placed under medical care.

By the later shows on the tour, its novelty had worn off and the strains were having an effect. Although the Victory album was certified double platinum by the RIAA for sales of two million copies, the shows were failing to sell out. Dates planned for Pittsburgh were cancelled; extra shows in Chicago made up the difference. By early October, the time of the shows in Toronto's Exhibition Stadium, a total of 50,000 tickets had gone unsold, so Sullivan renegotiated again, getting the Jacksons to agree to revenues based on actual sales.

Things got worse as the tour reached its final leg on the West Coast. In late November, the shows at Sun Devil Stadium in Tempe, Arizona, were canceled. Officially the reason was that Jermaine was too sick with the flu to perform, but there was some speculation that slow ticket sales played a role as well. Sullivan was so short of cash he stopped payment on a $1.9 million check to the group after the Vancouver dates. Immediately afterwards, he suffered a minor heart attack and left the hospital early to renegotiate with the Jacksons again, claiming losses of $5–6 million. By this time the parties were no longer meeting in person. The Jacksons agreed to waive the stopped payment in return for a greater share of revenue from the six final shows at Dodger Stadium. Sullivan's estimated profit was down to half a million dollars.

The Jacksons and King had made money even though Sullivan had not, and near the end of the tour they began making plans for a European leg, as well as an Australian leg. When word reached Michael, he let them know through his representatives that he would not take part. At the rain-soaked tour finale at Dodger Stadium, after six sold out shows, Michael announced at the end of the show that this would be the last time they would all perform together, much to his brothers' surprise. As a result, the plans to go to Europe and Australia were ended.

== Aftermath ==
Michael's announcement generated some backlash from his brothers. King stated:

There's no way Michael should be as big as he is and treat his family the way he does. He feels his father done him wrong? His father may have done some wrong, but he also had to do a whole lot right ... What Michael's got to realize is that he's a nigger ... He's one of the megastars of the world, but he's still going to be a nigger megastar. He must accept that. Not only must he understand that, he's got to accept it and demonstrate that he wants to be a nigger. Why? To show that a nigger can do it.

Michael was so upset when he learned of King's remarks that he called his lawyer John Branca and demanded to “sue his ass”. Branca calmed him down and persuaded him to drop the idea.

The Jacksons netted approximately $36 million, which worked out to about $7 million for each brother. Michael, who alone did not need the money, donated his share of the proceeds from the tour, approximately $5 million ($15 million in 2025 dollars), to three charities, as he had promised, including the T.J. Martell Foundation for Leukemia and Cancer Research, the United Negro College Fund, and Camp Ronald McDonald for Good Times. He had also received an $18 million advance ($56 million in 2025 dollars) from Sullivan for a Michael Jackson designer jeans brand, few of which were ever produced and sold before Sullivan had to stop production.

Estimates of SMC's losses have ranged from $13 million to $22 million ($40 million to $68 million in modern dollars). Sullivan and his father quietly put the word out around the NFL that the Patriots and their stadium were for sale. The $100 million asking price for the combined package made somewhat more sense when the Patriots unexpectedly qualified for Super Bowl XX after the next season, the first time they had ever done so. However, the immediate financial return for this achievement was limited especially since the team played the entirety of the 1985–86 postseason on the road. Thus, even after reaching the Super Bowl, the team's revenue was not nearly enough for the Sullivans to service the debt from the Victory Tour.

Compared to their contemporary major professional sports league colleagues, the Sullivans were never particularly wealthy owners. Furthermore Foxboro Stadium, although only a thirteen year old facility in 1984, was one of the smallest venues in the NFL and already well into the process of becoming outmoded by league standards. At one point the Sullivans were so close to bankruptcy that the NFL had to advance them $4 million to make their payroll. Chuck Sullivan's woes increased when his wife filed for divorce, and he had to set up a luxury box at Foxboro Stadium as his personal living quarters. He allegedly wrote several letters to Michael, begging for money to bail the team out, but Michael never replied.

Under heavy pressure from the NFL, the Sullivans finally gave up and sold the Patriots to Victor Kiam in 1988. However, Kiam was unable to keep himself or the team financially stable either, and eventually the Patriots were sold again in 1992 to James Orthwein. Meanwhile, Foxboro Stadium lapsed into bankruptcy and was purchased by Boston paper magnate Robert Kraft. Kraft used the stadium's lease as leverage to prevent Orthwein from breaking the agreement and moving the team to St. Louis. He further made it clear that he would go to court to enforce the lease's ironclad commitment for the Patriots to play in the stadium until 2001. Orthwein then put the team on the market, but the wording of the lease scared off potential buyers because they would also be required to negotiate with Kraft. Knowing this, Kraft made his own offer to buy the Patriots for $175 million in 1994. Orthwein was all but forced to accept what amounted to a hostile takeover. While Stan Kroenke offered $200 million for the team, Orthwein would have had to bear all relocation and legal expenses. The latter was important, since Kraft was willing to go to court to force any potential buyer to stay in Foxboro. Kraft has a Victory Tour poster in his office as a reminder of how he was able to realize his lifelong dream of owning the Patriots.

== Legacy ==
Aside from a few months in mid-1975 and Michael's 30th Anniversary Celebration concert in 2001, the Victory Tour was one of the very few times that all six Jackson brothers worked together at the same time as a band. Jackie missed most of the tour because of a leg injury, which was described at the time as a knee injury incurred during strenuous rehearsals. Margaret Maldonado, the mother of two of Jermaine's children, has alleged that Jackie in fact broke his leg in an automobile accident: his first wife Enid deliberately ran him over in a parking lot after catching him with Paula Abdul. Jackie would, however, eventually recover and was able to rejoin his brothers on stage for the last portion of the tour. Michael sang all the lead vocals, except for a trio of Jermaine's solo hits.

Eddie Van Halen made a special guest appearance at the July 13 show in Irving, Texas, playing the guitar solo on "Beat It".

Shortly after the tour ended and the announcement that it was the group's final tour, Michael returned to his solo career and Marlon left the group to start a solo career of his own.

== Set list ==
The following set list was performed during the tour.

1. "Wanna Be Startin' Somethin'"
2. "Things I Do for You"
3. "Off the Wall" (discarded after October 6th or 7th, Toronto. Returns for Los Angeles)
4. "Ben" / "Human Nature"
5. "This Place Hotel"
6. "She's Out of My Life"
7. "Let's Get Serious" / "You Like Me, Don't You?" / "Dynamite" / "Tell Me I'm Not Dreamin' (Too Good to Be True)"
8. "I Want You Back" / "The Love You Save" / "I'll Be There"
9. "Rock with You"
10. "Lovely One"
11. "Workin' Day and Night"
  Encore 1
12. "Beat It"
13. "Billie Jean"
  Encore 2
14. "Shake Your Body (Down to the Ground)" (with excerpts from "Don't Stop 'Til You Get Enough" and "State of Shock")

== Tour dates ==
The tour dates are adapted from both The Jacksons: Legacy and Michael Jackson FAQ: All That's Left to Know About the King of Pop, although there are sources that state the first Montreal show took place on September 16, 1984.

List of tour dates, showing date, city, country, venue, attendance, gross
Date	City	Country	Venue	Attendance	Revenue
July 6, 1984	Kansas City	United States	Arrowhead Stadium	135,000 / 135,000	$4,050,000
July 7, 1984	Kansas City	United States	Arrowhead Stadium	135,000 / 135,000	$4,050,000
July 8, 1984	Kansas City	United States	Arrowhead Stadium	135,000 / 135,000	$4,050,000
July 13, 1984	Irving	United States	Texas Stadium	118,803 / 118,803	$3,564,090
July 14, 1984	Irving	United States	Texas Stadium	118,803 / 118,803	$3,564,090
July 15, 1984	Irving	United States	Texas Stadium	118,803 / 118,803	$3,564,090
July 21, 1984	Jacksonville	United States	Gator Bowl Stadium	135,000 / 135,000	$4,050,000
July 22, 1984	Jacksonville	United States	Gator Bowl Stadium	135,000 / 135,000	$4,050,000
July 23, 1984	Jacksonville	United States	Gator Bowl Stadium	135,000 / 135,000	$4,050,000
July 29, 1984	East Rutherford	United States	Giants Stadium	150,798 / 150,798	$4,523,940
July 30, 1984	East Rutherford	United States	Giants Stadium	150,798 / 150,798	$4,523,940
July 31, 1984	East Rutherford	United States	Giants Stadium	150,798 / 150,798	$4,523,940
August 4, 1984	New York City	United States	Madison Square Garden	32,000 / 32,000	$960,000
August 5, 1984	New York City	United States	Madison Square Garden	32,000 / 32,000	$960,000
August 10, 1984	Knoxville	United States	Neyland Stadium	148,407 / 148,407	$4,452,210
August 11, 1984	Knoxville	United States	Neyland Stadium	148,407 / 148,407	$4,452,210
August 12, 1984	Knoxville	United States	Neyland Stadium	148,407 / 148,407	$4,452,210
August 17, 1984	Pontiac	United States	Pontiac Silverdome	145,000 / 145,000	$4,350,030
August 18, 1984	Pontiac	United States	Pontiac Silverdome	145,000 / 145,000	$4,350,030
August 19, 1984	Pontiac	United States	Pontiac Silverdome	145,000 / 145,000	$4,350,030
August 25, 1984	Orchard Park	United States	Rich Stadium	94,000 / 94,000	$2,820,000
August 26, 1984	Orchard Park	United States	Rich Stadium	94,000 / 94,000	$2,820,000
September 1, 1984	Philadelphia	United States	John F. Kennedy Stadium	145,000 / 145,000	$4,350,000
September 2, 1984	Philadelphia	United States	John F. Kennedy Stadium	145,000 / 145,000	$4,350,000
September 7, 1984	Denver	United States	Mile High Stadium	105,000 / 105,000	—N/a
September 8, 1984	Denver	United States	Mile High Stadium	105,000 / 105,000	—N/a
September 17, 1984	Montreal	Canada	Olympic Stadium	110,000 / 110,000	$2,640,000
September 18, 1984	Montreal	Canada	Olympic Stadium	110,000 / 110,000	$2,640,000
September 21, 1984	Washington, D.C.	United States	Robert F. Kennedy Memorial Stadium	180,000 / 180,000	—N/a
September 22, 1984	Washington, D.C.	United States	Robert F. Kennedy Memorial Stadium	180,000 / 180,000	—N/a
September 28, 1984	Philadelphia	United States	John F. Kennedy Stadium	—N/a	—N/a
September 29, 1984	Philadelphia	United States	John F. Kennedy Stadium	—N/a	—N/a
October 5, 1984	Toronto	Canada	Exhibition Stadium	47,288 / 47,288	$4,539,648
October 6, 1984	Toronto	Canada	Exhibition Stadium	47,288 / 47,288	$4,539,648
October 7, 1984	Toronto	Canada	Exhibition Stadium	47,288 / 47,288	$4,539,648
October 12, 1984	Chicago	United States	Comiskey Park	120,000 / 120,000	—N/a
October 13, 1984	Chicago	United States	Comiskey Park	120,000 / 120,000	—N/a
October 14, 1984	Chicago	United States	Comiskey Park	120,000 / 120,000	—N/a
October 19, 1984	Cleveland	United States	Cleveland Stadium	94,000 / 94,000	—N/a
October 20, 1984	Cleveland	United States	Cleveland Stadium	94,000 / 94,000	—N/a
October 26, 1984	Atlanta	United States	Atlanta–Fulton County Stadium	70,000 / 70,000	$1,960,000
October 27, 1984	Atlanta	United States	Atlanta–Fulton County Stadium	70,000 / 70,000	$1,960,000
November 2, 1984	Miami	United States	Miami Orange Bowl	120,788 / 120,788	$3,382,064
November 3, 1984	Miami	United States	Miami Orange Bowl	120,788 / 120,788	$3,382,064
November 9, 1984	Houston	United States	Houston Astrodome	80,000 / 80,000	—N/a
November 10, 1984	Houston	United States	Houston Astrodome	80,000 / 80,000	—N/a
November 16, 1984	Vancouver	Canada	BC Place	180,000 / 180,000	$2,896,800
November 17, 1984	Vancouver	Canada	BC Place	180,000 / 180,000	$2,896,800
November 18, 1984	Vancouver	Canada	BC Place	180,000 / 180,000	$2,896,800
November 30, 1984	Los Angeles	United States	Dodger Stadium	300,000 / 300,000	$4,200,000
December 1, 1984	Los Angeles	United States	Dodger Stadium	300,000 / 300,000	$4,200,000
December 2, 1984	Los Angeles	United States	Dodger Stadium	300,000 / 300,000	$4,200,000
December 7, 1984	Los Angeles	United States	Dodger Stadium	300,000 / 300,000	—N/a
December 8, 1984	Los Angeles	United States	Dodger Stadium	300,000 / 300,000	—N/a
December 9, 1984	Los Angeles	United States	Dodger Stadium	300,000 / 300,000	—N/a

== Known planned shows ==
List of cancelled concerts, showing date, city, country, venue, and reason for cancellation
Date	City	Country	Venue	Reason
June 22, 1984	Lexington	United States	Rupp Arena	—N/a
August 2, 1984	New York City	United States	Madison Square Garden	—N/a
August 3, 1984	New York City	United States	Madison Square Garden	—N/a
August 17, 1984	Indianapolis	United States	Hoosier Dome	—N/a
August 18, 1984	Indianapolis	United States	Hoosier Dome	—N/a
September 2, 1984	Inglewood	United States	The Forum	—N/a
September 3, 1984	Inglewood	United States	The Forum	—N/a
September 4, 1984	Inglewood	United States	The Forum	—N/a
September 7, 1984	Inglewood	United States	The Forum	—N/a
September 8, 1984	Inglewood	United States	The Forum	—N/a
September 9, 1984	Inglewood	United States	The Forum	—N/a
September 11, 1984	Inglewood	United States	The Forum	—N/a
September 12, 1984	Inglewood	United States	The Forum	—N/a
October 13, 1984	Pittsburgh	United States	Three Rivers Stadium	—N/a
October 14, 1984	Pittsburgh	United States	Three Rivers Stadium	—N/a
November 7, 1984	Anaheim	United States	Anaheim Stadium	—N/a
November 8, 1984	Anaheim	United States	Anaheim Stadium	—N/a
November 23, 1984	Tempe	United States	Sun Devil Stadium	Jermaine Jackson's flu
November 24, 1984	Tempe	United States	Sun Devil Stadium	Jermaine Jackson's flu

== Personnel ==
=== Performers ===
- Michael Jackson: vocals
- Randy Jackson: vocals, percussion, keyboards
- Jermaine Jackson: vocals; bass
- Tito Jackson: vocals; guitar
- Marlon Jackson: vocals; percussion
- Jackie Jackson: vocals; percussion (First performance during the Quebec concerts.)
- Keyboards: Rory Kaplan, Pat Leonard and Jai Winding
- Guitar: David Williams and Gregg Wright
- Drums: Jonathan Moffett
- Guitar: Eddie Van Halen appeared on one show

=== Credits ===
- Tour Coordinator and Co-Producer with the Jacksons: Larry Larson
- Assistant Coordinator: Marla Winston
- Production Manager: Peyton Wilson
- Production Assistants: Marcene (Peterson) O'Bryen & Machan (Margret) Taylor
- Assistant Production Managers: Gary Bouchard and Debbie Lyons
- Stage Manager: Mike Hirsh
- Assistant Stage Manager: Pee Wee Jackson
- Production Consultant: Ken Graham
- Site Coordinators: John "Bugzee" Hougdahl, Jose Ward
- Stage Construction and Engineering: Plainview, Inc. – John McGraw
- Robotic Lighting: Design – Michael Jackson
- Eidophor Video Projection: M.B. Productions, Inc.
- Design execution and manufacturing: Applied Entertainment Systems
- Lighting Company: TASCO, MORPHEUS LIGHTS INC.
- Lighting Designer: R.A. Roth
- Sound Company: Clair Brothers Audio
- House Mixers: ML Procise and Mike Stahl
- Monitor engineer: Rick Coberly
- Laser Effects: Showlasers, Inc., Dallas, Texas
- Laser Special Effects Operator: Michael Moorhead
- Laser Technician: Steve Glasow
- Musicians Costumes Design: Enid Jackson
- Magical Illusions: Franz Harary
- Tour Photographer: Harrison Funk
- Video Director: Sandy Fullerton
- Jackson Crew Sportswear: Nike
- Community Affairs: Harold Preston
- Consultant to Community Affairs: Cynthia Wilson
- Pyrotechnics Director: John Watkins

== See also ==
- List of highest-grossing concert tours
