= Body (The Jacksons song) =

Single by The Jacksons

from the album Victory
- B-side: "Body (Instrumental)"
- Released: October 1984
- Recorded: 1983–84
- Studio: Soundcastle (Los Angeles, California)
- Genre: Pop; funk
- Length: 5:06 (album version); 4:22 (7-inch version); 5:48 (12-inch version)
- Label: Epic
- Songwriter: Marlon Jackson
- Producer: Marlon Jackson

The Jacksons singles chronology
"Torture" (1984)	"Body" (1984)	"Nothin' (That Compares 2 U)" (1989)

Music video
- "Body" on YouTube

"Body" is the third single released off the album Victory by The Jacksons. Marlon Jackson (who wrote and produced the track) sang the song’s main verses while the rest of the group (excluding Jermaine Jackson) sang the chorus.

Jermaine Jackson did not participate in the recording in any capacity, and neither Michael Jackson nor Jermaine appear in the music video. The video does feature the rest of The Jacksons: Marlon, Tito, Jackie and Randy.

== Reception ==
Cash Box magazine said "'Body' is a light dance song that neither disappoints nor fully succeeds. Marred slightly by overused chord patterns, the tune nevertheless has a good pulse and particularly noteworthy build up to the chorus and features strong tracks and vocals throughout."

== Personnel ==
- Marlon Jackson – lead and background vocals, keyboards, synthesizers, Linn programming, arranging
- Jackie, Michael, Randy and Tito Jackson – background vocals
- John Barnes – arranging, Fairlight computerized keyboard, additional synthesizers
- David Ervin – additional synthesizers
- David Williams – guitar
- Greg Wright – guitar solo
- Jonathan Moffett – Simmons drums
- Bill Bottrell – engineer, mixing
- Paul Erickson, Mitch Gibson, Bino Espinoza – assistant engineers
- Nelson Hayes – project coordinator

== Charts ==
Chart (1984–85)	Peak position
U.S. Billboard Hot 100	47
U.S. Billboard Hot Black Singles	39
U.S. Billboard Hot Dance Club Play	73
