= State of Shock (song) =

1984 single by the Jacksons and Mick Jagger

Single by the Jacksons with Mick Jagger

from the album Victory
- B-side: "Your Ways"
- Released: June 18, 1984
- Recorded: November 11, 1983 – May 7, 1984
- Studio: Westlake Audio (Los Angeles); A & R Recording (New York)
- Genre: Hard rock; disco-rock
- Length: 4:30; 4:05 (7-inch); 5:41 (12-inch dance mix)
- Label: Epic; CBS
- Songwriters: Michael Jackson; Randy Hansen
- Producer: Michael Jackson

The Jacksons singles chronology
"Walk Right Now" (1981)	"State of Shock" (1984)	"Torture" (1984)

Mick Jagger singles chronology
"Memo from Turner" (1970)	"State of Shock" (1984)	"Just Another Night" (1985)

"State of Shock" is a song by the Jacksons and Mick Jagger, released on June 18, 1984, as the lead single from the Jacksons' fifteenth studio album, Victory. It was written by Michael Jackson and Randy Hansen. The song was originally intended as a duet by Michael Jackson and Freddie Mercury of the group Queen. However, due to scheduling conflicts, the duet between Jackson and Mercury did not happen, and the song became a duet between Jackson and Jagger instead. "State of Shock" rose into the top ten of the US Billboard Hot 100.

== Background ==
"State of Shock" features lead vocals by Michael Jackson and Mick Jagger. It was the Jacksons' highest charting song from their Victory album, released in 1984; the song peaked at number 3 on the US Billboard Hot 100 and number 14 on the UK Singles Chart. The song was originally recorded with Freddie Mercury, as Jackson and Mercury had been working on several songs at Jackson's home studio in 1983, including the unreleased title track "Victory" and "There Must Be More to Life Than This" from Mercury's Mr. Bad Guy album (1985). However, due to scheduling conflicts, Mercury was unable to finish his work with Jackson.

In his 1994 book Michael Jackson: Unauthorized, author Christopher Andersen described "State of Shock" as a hard rock song and added that Jagger respected Jackson's work and "eyed the phenomenal success of Thriller with envy." Further, he stated that Arthur Collins, then president of Rolling Stones Records, said that Jagger had become "obsessed" with Jackson and "wanted to know every detail about Jackson's life, his contract with Epic, how the Thriller singles were selling...". "State of Shock" was the last top ten hit for the Jacksons, as well as their last single to be certified gold. Jagger performed the song with Tina Turner for their 1985 performance at Live Aid.

In 2002, a demo of Mercury and Jackson singing "State of Shock" was leaked online. In 2014, William Orbit remixed the Mercury/Jackson version for release on Queen Forever, but the song was not included.

Guitarist Randy Hansen is often mentioned as co-writer of the song, but the credit refers to a different Randy Hansen. In a leaked interview for his autobiography Moonwalk, Jackson stated the lyrics were co-written by a 12-year-old boy with the same name. Guitarist Randy Hansen received royalties for the song erroneously, as he explained in a 2021 interview with Eddie Trunk.

An extended dance mix (5:41) of the song is available as a digitally remastered release. An instrumental clip of the song appeared on Jackson's posthumous album Immortal in 2011.

== Personnel ==
Credits adapted from Victory LP liner notes.

- Music written, composed and arranged by Michael Jackson
- Lyrics by Michael Jackson and Randy Hansen
- Produced by Michael Jackson
- Michael Jackson – lead vocals, backing vocals, handclaps, Linn LM-1 programming
- Mick Jagger – lead vocals
- Jackie Jackson – backing vocals
- Marlon Jackson – backing vocals
- Johnny Ray Nelson – backing vocals
- David Williams – guitar, bass guitar
- Paulinho Da Costa – percussion
- Bruce Swedien – engineer
- Brent Averil – original 16 track engineer
- Matt Forger – assistant engineer, technical director
- Ollie Cotton – assistant engineer
- Nelson Hayes – project coordinator
- Shari Dub – project coordinator

== Parodies ==
"Weird Al" Yankovic used the song several times. It was featured in the "Hooked on Polkas" medley on his 1985 album Dare to Be Stupid, and was also performed by Epic executive Harvey Leeds that year in the mockumentary The Compleat Al. The style was later used for the song "UHF" from the 1989 film of the same name.

Insane Clown Posse covered the song on Smothered, Covered & Chunked, a 2012 album of cover songs issued as the bonus disc of the "Red Pop" edition of their album The Mighty Death Pop!.

== Charts ==
=== Weekly charts ===
Weekly chart performance for "State of Shock"
Chart (1984)	Peak position
Australia (Kent Music Report)	10
Belgium (Ultratop 50 Flanders)	7
Canada Top Singles (RPM)	8
Italy (Musica e Dischi)	4
Netherlands (Dutch Top 40)	8
Netherlands (Single Top 100)	3
New Zealand (Recorded Music NZ)	16
Norway (VG-lista)	2
Peru (UPI)	3
Sweden (Sverigetopplistan)	13
Switzerland (Schweizer Hitparade)	11
UK Singles (Official Charts)	14
US Billboard Hot 100	3
US Black Singles (Billboard)	4
US Hot Dance/Disco Top 80 (Billboard)	3

=== Year-end charts ===
1984 year-end chart performance for "State of Shock"
Chart (1984)	Position
Belgium (Ultratop 50 Flanders)	42
Canada Top Singles (RPM)	81
Netherlands (Dutch Top 40)	67
Netherlands (Single Top 100)	67
US Billboard Hot 100	61

== Certifications ==
Certifications for "State of Shock"
Region	Certification	Certified units/sales
Canada (Music Canada)	Gold	50,000^{^}
United States (RIAA)	Gold	1,000,000^{^}
^{^} Shipments figures based on certification alone.
