= Victory (The Jacksons album) =

Studio album by the Jacksons
- Released: July 2, 1984
- Recorded: November 11, 1983 – May 7, 1984
- Studios: A&R (New York); Can-Am (Los Angeles); Evergreen (Burbank); Hog Manor; Image Recorders; The Ponderosa; Record One (Los Angeles); Soundcastle; Sunset Sound (Hollywood); The Villa; Westlake (Los Angeles); Bill Schnee (Hollywood); Hollywood Sound (Hollywood); Ocean Way (Hollywood); Sunset Sound (Hollywood); Village Recorders (Los Angeles)
- Genres: R&B; pop; synth-pop; rock
- Length: 40:31; 96:27 (expanded edition)
- Labels: Epic; CBS
- Producers: The Jacksons; David Paich; Steve Porcaro

The Jacksons chronology
18 Greatest Hits (1983)	Victory (1984)	2300 Jackson Street (1989)

Singles from Victory
- 1. "State of Shock" Released: June 1984; 2. "Torture" Released: August 1984; 3. "Body" Released: October 1984; 4. "Wait" Released: February 1985

Victory is the fifteenth studio album by The Jacksons (billed on the LP as merely "Jacksons," sans the determiner, "The"), released by Epic Records on July 2, 1984. The only album to include all six Jackson brothers together as an official group, Victory peaked at number four on the US Billboard 200 albums chart. Its most successful single, "State of Shock", peaked at number three on the US Billboard Hot 100 songs chart. The album was produced by the Jacksons along with David Paich and Steve Porcaro of Toto.

Victory was supported by the Victory Tour, with Michael, who had recently released the world's all-time best-selling album, Thriller (1982), being prominently featured on the tour's setlist. None of the songs from Victory were performed on the tour. Shortly afterward, Michael and Marlon Jackson quit the group to pursue solo careers. Jermaine, Tito, Randy, and Jackie Jackson continued on as the Jacksons and released one more album, 1989's 2300 Jackson Street (whose title track did feature all six Jackson brothers, along with their sisters Janet and Rebbie), before splitting up.

Victory was certified double platinum in the US in October 1984, and sold 7 million copies worldwide. A deluxe reissue was released on April 30, 2021, alongside other Jacksons albums.

== Recording ==
After a successful reunion on the Motown 25 television special in 1983, Jermaine Jackson decided to return to the group, having left Motown after nine years as a full-fledged soloist. His brothers had left Motown for Epic in 1975, but despite the reunion, the brothers rarely worked together on the album; it was mainly composed of solo songs the brothers had each worked on during that time. Each brother had a solo song on the album: Michael on "Be Not Always", Randy on "One More Chance" (not to be confused with their 1970 song of the same name from their ABC album) and "The Hurt", Tito on "We Can Change the World", Jackie on "Wait" and Marlon on "Body". Jermaine only sings co-lead vocals with Michael on "Torture". He also performs ad-libs on "Wait" and is additionally named as a background vocalist on "One More Chance" and "The Hurt". "Torture" was originally planned to be a duet between Michael and Jackie (the song's writer), but when Jermaine officially re-joined the group, he took over the parts intended for Jackie (who can still be heard during the song's chorus and ad-libs).

The album only had two videos—for the songs "Torture" and "Body"—and neither Jermaine nor Michael appeared in either one. A wax dummy of Michael from Madame Tussauds acted as a stand in for the "Torture" video.

Michael recorded "State of Shock", a duet originally recorded with Queen lead vocalist Freddie Mercury. The duo were unable to finish the track, so Michael ended up recording a second version of the track with Rolling Stones frontman Mick Jagger.

== Artwork ==
Tensions reportedly grew between the brothers during the recording sessions, and as a result, minimal publicity photography was done. At the request and demand of the label, the official album cover art instead features an illustrated painting of the band. The artwork was commissioned from famed science fiction and fantasy book cover illustrator, Michael Whelan.

The Jackson brothers from left to right on the cover go as follows: Marlon, Jackie, Randy, Michael, Jermaine, and Tito. On the record's first release, there was a white dove on Randy's shoulder, which was removed on later issues.

== Singles ==
The song "State of Shock" peaked at No. 3 on the Billboard Hot 100. The second single, "Torture", reached No. 17, and "Body", the third single, became a moderate hit peaking at No. 47. The album peaked at No. 4 on the Billboard 200 in the week of August 4, 1984. The fourth single, "Wait", was released in 1985 in the US, the UK, Canada and Brazil only – it is not known to have charted anywhere, and was possibly withdrawn. The single version of "Wait" is a remix which features a slap bassline in place of the original synth bass, as well as additional lead synth.

== Critical reception ==
Professional ratings
Review scores
Source	Rating
AllMusic	3/5 stars
Number One	1/5 stars
The Rolling Stone Album Guide	3/5 stars
Uncut	2/5 stars

AllMusic stated, "Victory has the distinctions of being the only Jacksons album to feature all six brothers and the last Jacksons album to feature Michael Jackson… In retrospect, Victory is a competent album of slick contemporary R&B, occasionally goosed toward greatness by the appearance of one of pop music's most identifiable voices. Which is the same thing you can say about nearly the entire Jackson 5/Jacksons catalog".

== Track listing ==
Side A
No.	Title	Lyrics	Music	Lead singer(s)	Length
1.	"Torture"	Jackie Jackson; Kathy Wakefield	Jackie Jackson	Jermaine; Michael; Jackie	4:53
2.	"Wait"	Jackie Jackson; David Paich	David Paich; Jackie Jackson	Jackie	5:25
3.	"One More Chance"	Randy Jackson	Randy Jackson	Randy	5:06
4.	"Be Not Always"	Michael Jackson; Marlon Jackson (add.)	Michael Jackson	Michael	5:36

Side B
No.	Title	Lyrics	Music	Lead singer(s)	Length
5.	"State of Shock" (with Mick Jagger)	Michael Jackson; Randy Hansen	Michael	Michael; Mick Jagger	4:30
6.	"We Can Change the World"	Tito Jackson; Wayne Arnold (add.)	Tito Jackson	Tito	4:45
7.	"The Hurt"	Michael Jackson; Randy Jackson; David Paich; Steve Porcaro	Michael Jackson; Randy Jackson	Randy	5:26
8.	"Body"	Marlon Jackson	Marlon Jackson	Marlon	5:06
Total length:					40:47

2021 re-edition bonus tracks
No.	Title	Length
9.	"State of Shock" (7" version)	4:06
10.	"State of Shock" (12" version – dance mix)	5:40
11.	"State of Shock" (12" version – instrumental)	4:38
12.	"Torture" (7" version)	4:30
13.	"Torture" (12" version – dance mix)	6:14
14.	"Torture" (12" version – instrumental)	5:06
15.	"Body" (7" version)	4:22
16.	"Body" (12" extended version)	5:48
17.	"Body" (7" version – instrumental)	4:15
18.	"Body" (12" version – instrumental extended)	6:45
19.	"Wait" (7" version)	4:19
Total length:		40:47 1:36:30

== Personnel ==
The Jacksons

- Marlon Jackson – lead vocals (track 8), keyboards, synthesizers, Linn LM-1 programming, and arrangements (track 8), background vocals (tracks 1–3, 5–8)
- Jackie Jackson – lead vocals (track 1, 2), background vocals (tracks 1–3, 5–8), vocal ad libs and horn arrangements (track 1), arrangements (tracks 1, 2)
- Randy Jackson – lead vocals (track 3, 7), background vocals (tracks 1–3, 6–8), keyboards & synthesizers (tracks 1, 3, 7), percussion (track 1), drum programming (track 3), arrangements (track 3, 7)
- Michael Jackson – lead vocals (tracks 1, 4, 5), background vocals (all tracks), Linn LM-1 programming & handclaps (track 5), arrangements (tracks 4, 5, 7)
- Jermaine Jackson – lead vocals (track 1), background vocals (tracks 1–3, 7)
- Tito Jackson – lead vocals (track 6), guitars, keyboards, synthesizers, drum programming, synthesizer programming, and arrangements (track 6), background vocals (tracks 1–3, 6–8)

Additional musicians

- John Barnes – Fairlight CMI (tracks 1, 3, 6, 8), additional synthesizers & arrangements (track 8)
- Michael Boddicker – keyboards, synthesizers, synth horns, and synth programming (track 1)
- Lenny Castro – percussion (tracks 2, 6)
- Paulinho da Costa – percussion (tracks 3, 5)
- Nathan East – bass (track 6)
- David Ervin – additional synth programming (track 1), additional synthesizer (track 8)
- Mick Jagger – lead vocals (track 5)
- Louis Johnson – bass (track 6)
- Gayle Levant – harp (track 4)
- Steve Lukather – guitar (track 2)
- Jonathan Moffett – Simmons drums (track 8)
- Johnny Ray Nelson – background vocals (track 5)
- David Paich – keyboards, synthesizer and arrangements (tracks 2, 7)
- Jeff Porcaro – drums (tracks 1, 2)
- Steve Porcaro – keyboards and synthesizer (tracks 2, 7), arrangements (track 7)
- Greg Poree – acoustic guitar (track 4)
- Robin Renee Ross – viola (track 4)
- Jack Wargo – guitar solo (track 1)
- David Williams – guitar (tracks 5, 6, 8), bass (track 5)
- Greg Wright – guitar solo (track 8)

Additional arrangements and artwork

- Murray Adler – concertmaster (track 4)
- Jerry Hey – trumpet and horn arrangements (track 1), string arrangements (track 4)
- Derek Nakamoto – additional synth programming (track 6)
- Painting by Michael Whelan
- Photography by Mathew Rolston

Production

- Produced by: Jackie Jackson (track 1), David Paich, Steve Porcaro and Jackie Jackson (track 2), Randy Jackson (track 3), Michael Jackson (tracks 4, 5), Tito Jackson (track 6), the Jacksons, David Paich and Steve Porcaro (track 7), Marlon Jackson (track 8)
- Engineers: Brent Averil (track 5), Bill Bottrell (tracks 1, 3, 6–8), Tito Jackson (track 6), Tom Knox (tracks 2, 7), Bruce Swedien (tracks 4, 5)
- Assistant engineers: Niko Bolas (track 2), Ollie Cotton (track 5), Paul Erickson (tracks 1, 3, 6–8), Bino Espinoza (tracks 1, 3, 6–8), Matt Forger (track 5), Stuart Furusho (track 2), Mitch Gibson (tracks 1, 3, 6, 8), Mike Hatcher (track 4), Shep Longsdale (tracks 2, 7), Brian Malouf (track 7), Terry Stewart (track 2), John Van Nest (track 4)
- Additional recordings technicians: Allen Sides, Ann Calnan, Brent Averill, Brian Malouf, Jermany Smith, Michael Schulman, Robin Laine
- Mixing: Niko Bolas (track 2), Bill Bottrell (tracks 1, 3, 6–8), Greg Ladanyi (track 2), Bruce Swedien (tracks 4, 5)

== Charts ==
This became the Jacksons' only studio album to top a national chart, and their only top 10 album in the UK.

Chart performance for Victory
Chart (1984)	Peak position
Argentinian Albums (CAPIF)	1
Australian Albums (Kent Music Report)	9
Austrian Albums (Ö3 Austria)	2
Canadian Albums (RPM)	1
Dutch Albums (Album Top 100)	2
Finnish Albums (Suomen virallinen lista)	1
German Albums (Offizielle Top 100)	5
Italian Albums (Musica e Dischi)	12
Japanese Albums (Oricon)	5
New Zealand Albums (RMNZ)	19
Norwegian Albums (VG-lista)	6
Spanish Albums (AFE)	4
Swedish Albums (Sverigetopplistan)	7
Swiss Albums (Schweizer Hitparade)	4
UK Albums (OCC)	3
US Billboard 200	4
US Top R&B/Hip-Hop Albums (Billboard)	3
Zimbabwean Albums (ZIMA)	2

== Certifications ==
Certifications for Victory
Region	Certification	Certified units/sales
Australia (ARIA)	Gold	35,000^{^}
Belgium (BRMA)	Gold	25,000^{*}
Canada (Music Canada)	2× Platinum	200,000^{^}
Finland (Musiikkituottajat)	Gold	34,908
France (SNEP)	Gold	100,000^{*}
Japan (RIAJ)	Platinum	200,000^{^}
Netherlands (NVPI)	Gold	50,000^{^}
United Kingdom (BPI)	Gold	100,000^{^}
United States (RIAA)	2× Platinum	3,000,000
Summaries
Worldwide	—	7,000,000
^{*} Sales figures based on certification alone.^{^} Shipments figures based on certification alone.

== Remastered version ==
A remastered version was released in July 2009 in Japan only, with cardboard sleeve (mini LP) packaging. It was part of a six-album Jacksons cardboard sleeve (mini LP) reissue series, featuring the albums The Jacksons (1976), Goin' Places (1977), Destiny (1978), Triumph (1980) and The Jacksons Live! (1981).
