= Goin' Places (The Jacksons album) =

Studio album by the Jacksons
- Released: October 18, 1977
- Recorded: December 1976 – August 1977
- Studios: Sigma Sound (Philadelphia, Pennsylvania)
- Length: 37:52
- Labels: Epic; PIR
- Producers: Kenneth Gamble & Leon Huff; McFadden & Whitehead; Victor Carstarphen; Dexter Wansel; The Jacksons

The Jacksons chronology
The Jacksons (1976)	Goin' Places (1977)	Destiny (1978)

Singles from Goin' Places
- 1. "Goin' Places" Released: September 1977; 2. "Find Me a Girl" Released: January 1978 (US); 3. "Even Though You're Gone" Released: January 1978 (UK); 4. "Music's Takin' Over" Released: March 1978 (UK)

Goin' Places is the twelfth studio album by the Jacksons. It would be the last Jacksons' album released as a joint venture between Epic Records and Philadelphia International Records. Goin' Places peaked at No. 63 on the Billboard 200 albums chart in the United States, and at No. 11 on the US Soul Albums chart. The album sold over half a million copies worldwide. A concert tour to promote the album, named the Goin' Places Tour, ran from January to May 1978.

== Release ==
Goin' Places was released on October 18, 1977, on Epic Records. It was the group's 12th album, and would be the last Jacksons' album released as a joint venture between Epic Records and Philadelphia International Records. By 1978, the Jacksons would record primarily with Epic and would return to mainstream success with their next album, Destiny.

This is considered their lowest-selling album next to 2300 Jackson Street. The album peaked at No. 63 on the US Billboard 200, and at No. 11 on the US Soul albums chart. It sold over half a million copies worldwide.

Goin' Places spawned the disco-hit "Different Kind of Lady" written by the group. The song gave the brothers the confidence to write and produce an entire album by themselves.

== Music videos ==
In November 1977 the Jacksons released music videos to promote songs from the album.

The “Goin' Places” music video has the members of the band switching from a live performance to traveling in many different ways. The video for "Even Though You're Gone" features the band members sitting (Michael separated from the rest of the group) singing the song. The video features the Jacksons wearing blue tuxedos.

== Critical reception ==
Professional ratings
Review scores
Source	Rating
AllMusic	3/5 stars
The Rolling Stone Album Guide	3/5 stars
Uncut	3/5 stars

Goin' Places received generally positive reviews. AllMusic stated, "The Jacksons' move to Epic regenerated their enthusiasm and spirit for several years. The Gamble & Huff team brought them fresh material and new production ideas, as well as better tracks and arrangements than they'd gotten in quite a while on Motown. This album got them R&B and pop hits and kept the family act in the spotlight for a little while longer".

== Track listing ==
All tracks are written by Kenneth Gamble and Leon Huff; except where noted.

Side one
No.	Title	Writer(s)	Length
1.	"Music's Takin' Over"	John Whitehead; Gene McFadden; Victor Carstarphen	4:26
2.	"Goin' Places"		4:30
3.	"Different Kind of Lady"	Jackie Jackson; Michael Jackson; Marlon Jackson; Randy Jackson; Tito Jackson	4:10
4.	"Even Though You're Gone"		4:31

Side two
No.	Title	Writer(s)	Length
5.	"Jump for Joy"	Dexter Wansel; Cynthia Biggs	4:42
6.	"Heaven Knows I Love You, Girl"		3:55
7.	"Man of War"		3:13
8.	"Do What You Wanna"	Jackie Jackson; Michael Jackson; Marlon Jackson; Randy Jackson; Tito Jackson	3:31
9.	"Find Me a Girl"		4:34
Total length:			37:52

== Personnel ==
The Jacksons

- Michael Jackson – lead and backing vocals
- Tito Jackson – lead (tracks 6 & 7) and backing vocals, guitars
- Marlon Jackson – lead (track 7) and backing vocals
- Jackie Jackson – lead (track 7) and backing vocals
- Randy Jackson – lead (track 7) and backing vocals, congas

Additional musicians

- Charles Collins – drums
- David Cruse, Larry Washington – bongos, congas
- Roland Chambers, Michael "Sugar Bear" Forman, Dennis Harris – guitars
- Leon Huff, Dexter Wansel – keyboards, piano
- Dexter Wansel, Jack Faith – arrangements

Technical

- Leon Huff, Kenneth Gamble – executive producers
- Jay Mark, Joe Tarsia – engineers
- Ed Lee, John Berg – design
- Reid Miles – photography

== Charts ==
=== Album ===
Chart (1977)	Peak position
UK Albums (OCC)	45
US Billboard Top LPs & Tape	63
US Soul LPs (Billboard)	11

=== Charted Singles ===
Year	Single	Chart positions		
Year	Single	U.S. Billboard Hot 100	U.S. R&B	U.K.
1977	"Goin' Places"	52	8	26
1977	"Find Me a Girl"	-	38	-
1978	"Even Though You're Gone"	-	-	31
