= Torture (song) =

Single by the Jacksons

from the album Victory
- B-side: "Torture (Instrumental)"
- Released: August 1984
- Studio: Soundcastle (Los Angeles, California)
- Genre: Synth-rock
- Length: 4:53 (album version); 4:25 (7-inch version); 6:17 (12-inch dance mix)
- Label: Epic
- Songwriters: Jackie Jackson; Kathleen Wakefield
- Producer: Jackie Jackson

The Jacksons singles chronology
"State of Shock" (1984)	"Torture" (1984)	"Body" (1984)

Music video
- "Torture" on YouTube

"Torture" is the second single released off the album Victory by the Jacksons. Written by Jackie Jackson and fellow Motown veteran Kathy Wakefield, the song is about the end of a relationship and the ensuing emotional tumult one goes through while remaining in love with their former partner. Jackie was originally going to sing the song with his brother, Michael, but Jackie's role instead went to Jermaine Jackson, whose availability for the album was in question until the last minute. The rest of the Jacksons sang the chorus along with Michael, Jermaine and Jackie.

The song received mixed reactions from critics. Notably, Michael was not available to film the music video, instead being replaced by a wax dummy. Paula Abdul replaced Perri Lister as the video's choreographer, which features various depictions of the Jackson brothers being tortured. The shoot was an expensive and arduous affair that neither Michael nor Jermaine took part in, and it ultimately bankrupted the production company. The song peaked at number 17 on the Billboard Hot 100 chart, making it the second best-selling single on the album, behind "State of Shock". It also peaked at number 26 on the UK charts. This was their last single to reach the US Top 40.

== Writing and recording ==
"Torture" was written by Jackie Jackson. Motown writer Kathy Wakefield also helped in the writing. Originally Jackie was going to record the vocals along with Michael. However, Jermaine Jackson sang vocals in Jackie's place, because he did not know whether he would be fully involved with the Victory album until the last minute. On the recording, Michael and Jermaine sing a duet, with the rest of the group providing backing vocals. "Torture" was Jermaine's only main contribution to the Victory album. The B-side of the single was an instrumental version of the song.

One misconception is that the lyrics are about sadomasochism and physical torture, claims that Susan Baker of the Parents Music Resource Center had at one time made. The lyrics to the song are about a relationship that is about to end, and how the feelings of love become "torture" when a breakup is nearing. One of the members of the relationship is still in love with the other and feels that the breakup is "torture".

== Music video ==
Jeff Stein was the director of the music video; and Bryce Walmsley was the scenic designer. Jackie Jackson also oversaw the production, acting as an advisor. The dancing skeletons were animated at Peter Wallach Enterprises. Neither Michael nor Jermaine appears in the video: Jermaine was busy with other obligations, and Michael refused to be in the video. After Michael had sketched out ideas for the shoot with the production company and his brothers, Stein and producer John Diaz had a feeling he would skip the actual shoot, so they rented a wax dummy of Michael from Madame Tussaud's museum in Nashville. "[It] was put through the wringer," Stein said. "Its head ended up in the salad bowl at lunch one day." The dummy was ultimately used in three separate sequences, including the ending sequence that shows the rest of the group standing in a shot similar to the album cover. The television show PM Magazine later discovered the dummy's use through an analysis of the video. "I was so young and naïve, I just figured this is what they normally do in music videos," recalled Paula Abdul, who eventually became the choreographer.

Perri Lister, an alumna of the British dance troupe Hot Gossip, was initially hired as the video's choreographer. Field told her that Jackie wanted his girlfriend, Abdul, to be in the video. She successfully auditioned and Lister put her in a group of similarly-built women. Abdul did not show up once rehearsals started and Lister went on without her. According to Field, Jackie told him a few days later thar Lister "wasn't right" for the Jacksons. After a week, Jackie and Abdul showed up at rehearsals, and Stein told Lister that Jackie had indicated that Abdul wanted to choreograph the video. Abdul, a Laker Girl at the time, took over as the choreographer from that point. She said some of the members of the band approached her at a Laker game and asked if she wanted to choreograph the video. "My only problem was how to tell the Jacksons how to dance," Abdul later recalled. "I was young, I was scared. I'm not quite sure how I got through that." Abdul was later chosen to be the choreographer for the Jacksons' Victory tour.

Stein recalled the shoot as "an experience that lived up to the song title". It finished over schedule and over budget. By the end the Jacksons themselves had stopped showing up. Stein says it was so stressful that one of his crew members lost control of her bodily functions. "The crew motto used to be 'Death or victory'," he said. "I think that was the only time we ever prayed for death."

Paul Flattery, a producer with the Picture Music International production company, blamed the handling of this video by producer Diaz and director Stein for driving the company into bankruptcy. "I'll take the blame for many things, but not that video," Stein said. "We were constantly waiting around for everybody to be ready. It was endless."

== Reception ==
Reception for the song was mixed. The Philadelphia Inquirer said that the song was "a hard-rock dance tune with blaring synthesizers and buzzing guitars." The reviewer, however, didn't like the song, summing it up with one word: "Yawn." The Sacramento Bee complimented Jackie Jackson for being the only person "besides Michael" to "rise above the generic," citing "Torture" as one of the two songs by Jackie that were more than exceptional on the album. William Ruhlmann of AllMusic considered the song a "Track pick", and mentioned that its popularity probably had to do more with the fact that Michael Jackson was involved. "So, here one has the ludicrous situation of an album in which Marlon Jackson has as prominent a role as Michael Jackson. That's how it sounded to listeners in 1984, anyway, and they weren't fooled — "State of Shock", on which Michael shared vocals with Mick Jagger, was a gold Top Ten hit, and "Torture", which teamed Michael with Jermaine, made the Top 40, while the album went platinum. But the tracks by other group members went virtually ignored," Ruhlmann said.

== Personnel ==
- Jermaine Jackson – lead and background vocals
- Michael Jackson – lead and background vocals
- Jackie Jackson – ad-lib vocals, background vocals, arrangements, horn arrangements
- Randy Jackson – background vocals, keyboards, synthesizers, percussion
- Marlon Jackson – background vocals
- Tito Jackson – background vocals, guitar
- John Barnes – Fairlight synthesizer
- Michael Boddicker – keyboards, synthesizers, synth horns, synth programming
- David Ervin – additional synth programming
- Jeff Porcaro – drums
- Jack Wargo – guitar solo
- David Ervin – additional synth programming
- Jerry Hey – trumpet, horn arrangements
- Bill Bottrell – engineer, mixing
- Paul Erickson, Mitch Gibson, Bino Espinoza – assistant engineers
- Nelson Hayes – project coordinator

== Charts ==
Chart (1984)	Peak position
Australia (Kent Music Report)	32
Belgium (Ultratop 50 Flanders)	9
Canada (RPM)	12
France (SNEP)	14
Irish Singles Chart	13
Netherlands (Single Top 100)	14
New Zealand (Recorded Music NZ)	22
UK (Official Charts Company)	26
U.S. Billboard Hot 100	17
U.S. Billboard Hot Dance Club Play	9
U.S. Billboard Hot R&B/Hip-Hop Singles	12
West Germany (GfK)	31
