= Do What You Do (Jermaine Jackson song) =

1984 single by Jermaine Jackson

- European release cover

Single by Jermaine Jackson

from the album Jermaine Jackson
- B-side: "Tell Me I'm Not Dreamin' (Too Good to Be True)"
- Released: October 1984
- Recorded: 1984
- Genre: R&B
- Length: 4:46
- Label: Arista
- Songwriters: Larry Di Tommaso, Ralph Dino
- Producer: Jermaine Jackson

Jermaine Jackson singles chronology
"Sweetest Sweetest" (1984)	"Do What You Do" (1984)	"When the Rain Begins to Fall" (1985)

Music video
- "Do What You Do" on YouTube

"Do What You Do" is a song by American R&B singer Jermaine Jackson. It was released in October 1984 as the second US single from his self-titled album (marketed as Dynamite in international territories), and as the fourth single in Europe, serving as the follow-up to the hit single "When the Rain Begins to Fall".

The single was one of Jackson's first major releases with Arista Records, following a lengthy career with Motown Records both as a member of the Jackson 5 and as a solo artist.

The song became a commercial success, securing its place as one of his six top 20 solo hits on the US Billboard Hot 100, where it peaked at No. 13. Additionally, the ballad reached No. 14 on the Billboard R&B chart and spent three weeks at No. 1 on the Billboard Adult Contemporary chart. Internationally, the single peaked at No. 29 on Canada's RPM Top Singles chart and became one of Jackson's biggest hits in the United Kingdom, reaching No. 6 on the UK Singles Chart.

In the ballad, Jackson pleads with his lover to recreate the romance and intimacy they shared in the past, singing in the chorus: 'Do what you do / when you did what you did to me'

== Background ==
"Do What You Do" was recorded during a pivotal moment in Jackson's career. After spending 13 years with Motown Records, Jackson left the label in 1983 and signed with Arista Records. The self-titled album (released internationally as *Dynamite*) marked his debut with Arista.

The release of the single coincided with Jackson's high-profile reunion with his brothers for The Jacksons' 1984 Victory Tour, which brought him significant media attention and helped boost the song's commercial success.

In the United States, the vinyl single of "Do What You Do" featured Jackson's duet with his brother Michael, "Tell Me I'm Not Dreamin' (Too Good to Be True)", as its B-side. Due to legal disputes between Arista and Epic Records, the duet could not be officially released as an A-side single, which led to high radio airplay and increased sales for the "Do What You Do" single.

== Composition ==
"Do What You Do" is a mid-tempo R&B and pop ballad built around a lush synthesizer arrangement and a steady electronic drum beat, characteristic of mid-1980s pop production. The song is written in the key of F-sharp minor with a moderate tempo, featuring an emotional and soulful vocal performance by Jackson. Lyrically, the track explores themes of heartbreak, nostalgia, and longing, as the narrator pleads with a former lover to recreate the intimacy they once shared.

== Music video ==
The music video, directed by Bob Giraldi and produced by Anthony Payne, was an imitation of The Godfather, and supermodel Iman played Jackson's love interest who eventually betrays him by trying to shoot him. After his henchmen take her away, it is not revealed what happened to her.

== Charts ==
=== Weekly charts ===
Chart (1984–1985)	Peak position
Belgium (Ultratop 50 Flanders)	1
France (SNEP)	12
Netherlands (Dutch Top 40)	4
Netherlands (Single Top 100)	4
UK Singles (Official Charts)	6
US Billboard Hot 100	13
US Adult Contemporary (Billboard)	1
US Hot R&B/Hip-Hop Songs (Billboard)	14
West Germany (GfK)	40

=== Year-end charts ===
Chart (1985)	Position
Belgium (Ultratop Flanders)	13
Netherlands (Dutch Top 40)	38
Netherlands (Single Top 100)	43
US Billboard Hot 100	90
US Adult Contemporary (Billboard)	12

== Certifications ==
Region	Certification	Certified units/sales
United Kingdom (BPI)	Silver	250,000^{^}
^{^} Shipments figures based on certification alone.

== See also ==
- List of Hot Adult Contemporary number ones of 1984
