= Baby Tonight (song) =

Single by Marlon Jackson

from the album Baby Tonight
- B-side: "Baby Tonight (Dub Version)"
- Released: June 30, 1987
- Recorded: 1987
- Genre: R&B; soul
- Length: 4:29
- Label: Capitol
- Songwriter(s): Marlon Jackson
- Producer(s): Marlon Jackson

Marlon Jackson singles chronology
| "Baby Tonight" (1987) | "Don't Go" (1987) |

"Baby Tonight" is a single written, produced and sung by Marlon Jackson from his solo debut album, Baby Tonight. The song was released as the album's lead single on June 30, 1987 by Capitol Records. It reached No. 57 on the Hot R&B Singles chart in the United States. It is also one of two singles from the album.

== Charts ==
| Chart (1987–88) | Peak position |
|---|---|
| US Hot Black Singles (Billboard) | 57 |
