= Jackie Jackson (album) =

Studio album by Jackie Jackson
- Released: October 1973
- Recorded: April 1972
- Studio: Motown Recording Studios, Hollywood, California
- Genre: Soul
- Length: 33:20
- Label: Motown
- Producer: The Corporation; Berry Gordy

Jackie Jackson chronology
Jackie Jackson (1973)	Be the One (1989)

Professional ratings
Review scores
Source	Rating
AllMusic	1.5/5 stars

Jackie Jackson is the self-titled debut album from Jackie Jackson, the eldest member of the Jackson 5, released on Motown in October 1973, a month after G.I.T.: Get It Together. It was arranged by Eddy Manson, Gene Page and the Corporation.

== Track listing ==
Side A

1. "Love Don't Want to Leave" (The Corporation, Christine Yarian) – 3:10
2. "It's So Easy" (The Corporation) – 2:57
3. "Thanks to You" (Beatrice Verdi, Christine Yarian) – 3:15
4. "You're The Only One" (The Corporation) – 3:03
5. "Didn't I (Blow Your Mind This Time)" (Thom Bell, William Hart) – 3:15

Side B

1. "Do I Owe" (The Corporation, Christine Yarian) – 3:25
2. "Is It Him or Me" (The Corporation, Christine Yarian) – 4:26
3. "In My Dreams" (The Corporation, Christine Yarian) – 3:05
4. "One and the Same" (The Corporation, Christine Yarian) – 2:55
5. "Bad Girl" (Berry Gordy, William Robinson) – 4:10
