= 2300 Jackson Street (song) =

Single by The Jacksons

from the album 2300 Jackson Street
- B-side: "When I Look at You"
- Released: April 16, 1989
- Recorded: 1989
- Studio: Westlake Recording Studios (studio D) (Los Angeles, California)
- Genre: Pop; R&B
- Length: 5:05
- Label: Epic
- Songwriters: Jermaine Jackson; Jackie Jackson; Tito Jackson; Randall Jackson; Aaron Hall
- Producers: The Jacksons; Teddy Riley

The Jacksons singles chronology
"Nothin' (That Compares 2 U)" (1989)	"2300 Jackson Street" (1989)	"Art of Madness" (1989)

Music video
- "2300 Jackson Street" on YouTube

"2300 Jackson Street" is a 1989 single released by the Jacksons from their album of the same name. It is the only song on the album featuring Michael and Marlon Jackson, as they had left the group before further recording sessions. The song also features two of the Jackson sisters: Rebbie and Janet. "2300 Jackson Street" is about the Jackson family's childhood home on 2300 Jackson Street in Gary, Indiana.

== Music video ==
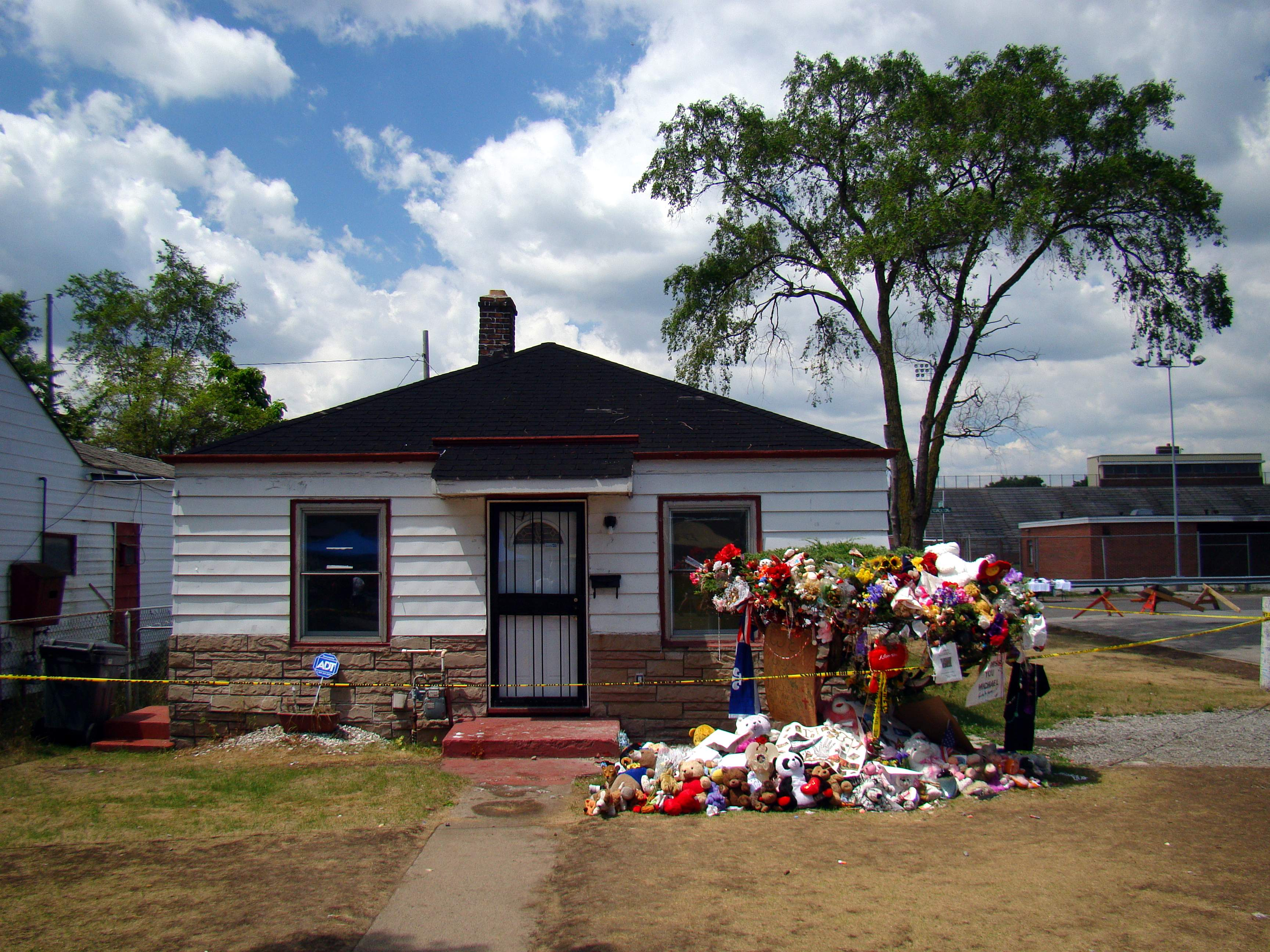
2300 Jackson Street in Gary, Indiana, the namesake of the song, in July 2009

The music video was directed by Greg Gold and produced by Phil Rose. The video features most of the Jackson family members. La Toya is not featured in the music video nor the song, as she was estranged from the family at the time. Marlon, while he sang on the track, also did not appear in the video as he was estranged from their father Joe at the time and did not want to appear near him. Some scenes include the Jackson family playing pool and Jermaine, Tito, Randy and Jackie playing football. It also shows some members of the Jackson family singing the song together. The video was shot in March 1989 in Hayvenhurst, Encino, Los Angeles.

=== Featured in the video ===
- Austin Brown
- Autumn Joy Jackson
- Brandi Jackson
- Jaimy Jackson
- Jackie Jackson
- Janet Jackson
- Jeremy Maldonaldo Jackson
- Jermaine Jackson, Jr.
- Joe Jackson
- Jermaine Jackson
- Katherine Jackson
- Michael Jackson
- Randy Jackson
- Rebbie Jackson
- Sigmund Esco Jackson, Jr.
- Stacee Brown
- T. J. Jackson
- Tito Jackson
- Taj Jackson
- Taryll Jackson
- Yashi Brown

== Charts ==
Chart performance for "2300 Jackson Street"
Chart (1989)	Peak position
Netherlands (Single Top 100)	39
UK Singles (OCC)	76
US Billboard Hot Black Singles	9
