= Don't Go (Marlon Jackson song) =

Single by Marlon Jackson

from the album Baby Tonight
- B-side: "Don't Go (Instrumental)"
- Released: September 7, 1987
- Recorded: 1987
- Genre: R&B; soul
- Length: 4:09
- Label: Capitol
- Songwriter: Marlon Jackson
- Producer: Marlon Jackson

Marlon Jackson singles chronology
"Baby Tonight" (1987)	"Don't Go" (1987)

"Don't Go" is a single written, produced and sung by Marlon Jackson, from his solo debut album Baby Tonight. The song was released as the album's second and final single on September 7, 1987, by Capitol Records. On the Billboard Hot Black Singles chart, it peaked at No. 2. It was also his second and final single.

== Charts ==
Chart (1987–88)	Peak position
US Hot Black Singles	2
