= Be the One (album) =

Studio album by Jackie Jackson
- Released: September 9, 1989
- Recorded: 1989
- Genre: R&B; soul; dance funk
- Length: 47:47
- Label: Polydor; PolyGram
- Producer: Robert Brookins; Jackie Jackson

Jackie Jackson chronology
Jackie Jackson (1973)	Be the One (1989)

Singles from Jackie Jackson
- 1. "Cruzin'" Released: 1989; 2. "Stay" Released: 1989

Be the One is the second studio album by Jackie Jackson, released on September 9, 1989 by Polydor Records and distributed by PolyGram. The musicians included Paul Jackson, Jr., Jeff Lorber, Robert Brookins and Gerald Albright.

== Critical reception ==
With a 3 out of 5 star rating David Silverman of the Chicago Tribune wrote "Be the One stands on its own as a collection of rhythm and blues, soul and dance funk that is accessible, heartwarming and more than anything else, fun."

== Track listing ==
No.	Title	Writer(s)	Length
1.	"Stay"	Robert Brookins; Jackie Jackson; Dianne Quander	3:55
2.	"Be the One"	R. Brookins; Tony Haynes	4:15
3.	"Fun"	R. Brookins; Haynes	5:07
4.	"Who's Loving You Now"	R. Brookins; Haynes; Attala Zane Giles	4:06
5.	"Cruzin"	R. Brookins; Clinton "Spud" Blanson; Walter Gordon; Brian Randle	4:20
6.	"Fine Fine Lady"	R. Brookins; Jackson; Mike Dailey; Michael Brookins	4:14
7.	"Stuck on You"	R. Brookins; Jackson; Quander	5:29
8.	"Don't Rush It"	Glen J. Barbee; Leon F. Sylvers	4:00
9.	"Broken Heart"	R. Brookins; Giles	3:56
10.	"Stay" (12" remix)	R. Brookins; Jackson; Quander	8:43

== Personnel ==
Musicians

- Jackie Jackson – lead vocals, background vocals (6, 8)
- Gerald Albright – saxophone solo (7)
- Glen J. Barbee – background vocals (8)
- Clinton "Spud" Blanson – drums (5)
- Robert Brookins – keyboards, drums (1-7, 9, 10), computer programming (1-6, 9, 10), synthesizer solo (3), background vocals (3, 5, 6), arranger (4)
- Alex Brown – background vocals (1-4, 6, 7, 9, 10), harmony vocals (3)
- Carl Carwell – background vocals (1-4, 6, 7, 9, 10)
- Suzette Charles – lead vocals (9)
- Lynn Davis – background vocals (2, 4, 9)
- Portia Griffin – background vocals (1, 5, 10)
- Paul Jackson Jr. – guitar (1, 2, 4, 7-10)
- Marva King – background vocals (1, 3, 6, 10), harmony vocals (3)
- David Koz – alto saxophone (6)
- Wayne Linsey – keyboards and drum programming (8)
- Jeff Lorber – keyboards (3, 5, 6, 8), percussion overdubs (3, 5, 6), drum programming (8), arranger (8)
- LaChelle Mathenia – background vocals (6)

Technical personnel

- Robert Brookins – producer, mixing
- Jackie Jackson – producer (1, 2, 4, 6, 8-10)
- Jeff Lorenzen – engineer, mixing
- David Ahlert – engineer
- Robert Brown – engineer
- Maureen Droney – engineer
- Susan Rogers – engineer
- Mitch Gibson – engineer

== Charts ==
Chart (1989–90)	Peak position
US Top R&B Albums (Billboard)	84
