= Goin' Places (song) =

1977 single by The Jacksons

Single by The Jacksons

from the album Goin' Places
- B-side: "Do What You Wanna"
- Released: September 1977
- Recorded: December 1976
- Studio: Sigma Sound, Philadelphia, Pennsylvania
- Genre: Funk; Soul
- Length: 4:30 (Album Version); 3:30 (7" Version)
- Label: Epic; PIR
- Songwriter: Gamble and Huff
- Producers: Gamble and Huff

The Jacksons singles chronology
"Show You the Way to Go" (1977)	"Goin' Places" (1977)	"Blame It On the Boogie" (1978)

Music video
- "Goin' Places" on YouTube

"Goin' Places" is a song written by Gamble and Huff and recorded by The Jacksons for their twelfth album of the same name. Released as the album's lead single a few weeks before the album was released, it peaked at #52 on the Billboard Hot 100 on November 12, 1977.

== Music video ==
The music video focused on scenes between the brothers performing on stage and playing around New York City. Locations in the video included Central Park and the Statue of Liberty.

== Charts ==
Chart (1977–78)	Peak position
U.S. Billboard Hot 100	52
U.S. Billboard Hot Black Singles	8
U.S. Billboard Hot Dance Club Play	40
