= Tell Me I'm Not Dreamin' (Too Good to Be True) =

- Side-B label of the single "Do What You Do"

Single by Jermaine Jackson featuring Michael Jackson

from the album Jermaine Jackson
- A-side: "Do What You Do"
- Released: October 1984
- Genre: Synth-pop
- Length: 4:22
- Label: Arista
- Songwriters: Michael Omartian; Bruce Sudano; Jay Gruska
- Producer: Michael Omartian

"Tell Me I'm Not Dreamin' (Too Good to Be True)" is a song by American singer and actor Jermaine Jackson featuring his younger brother Michael Jackson, taken from Jermaine Jackson's eponymous album. Jason Elias of AllMusic called this song "percolating and infectious."

The vocal version of "Tell Me I'm Not Dreamin'" was on the B-side to both the 7" and 12" versions of Jermaine Jackson's single "Do What You Do", while an instrumental version of the song was on the B-side to another Jermaine Jackson single, "Dynamite".

In her 1993 book Michael Jackson: The King of Pop, author Lisa D. Campbell stated that "although it was never officially released as a single because of legal difficulties between Michael's label, Epic, and Jermaine's label, Arista, the song did receive a lot of airplay." As a result, Billboard did not include the song on any "singles" chart. Nor, at the time, did Billboard publish an airplay-only chart. The song, however, performed very well on Radio and Records, having reached the top spot on the Urban Airplay chart and the No. 6 on the Top 40 Airplay, both in June 8, 1984. The song was most successful on the Billboard Hot Dance Club Play chart, where it spent three weeks at No. 1 that same June. The song was performed as a medley with some of Jermaine Jackson's other solo hits ("Let's Get Serious" and "Dynamite") on the Jacksons' 1984 Victory Tour.

The song was nominated at the 1985 Grammy Awards for Best R&B Performance by a Duo or Group with Vocals.

In 1988, British singer Robert Palmer covered the song on his album, Heavy Nova. It was released as a single in June 1989 and reached No. 60 on the Billboard Hot 100.

== See also ==
- List of Billboard number-one dance singles of 1984
