= Christopher Andersen =

American journalist and author (born 1949)

- Born: Christopher Peter Andersen; May 26, 1949 (age 77); Pensacola, Florida, U.S.
- Occupations: Journalist, author
- Writing career
- Language: English
- Genres: Journalism, biography

Christopher Peter Andersen (born May 26, 1949) is an American journalist and the author of 36 books, including many bestsellers.

== Life ==
Andersen began his career in journalism in 1966 at age 16 as a reporter and editor for a chain of local daily newspapers in the San Francisco Bay Area. Two years later he joined the San Francisco bureau of Time Magazine and after graduating from the University of California at Berkeley in 1971 became a New York-based contributing editor of Time Andersen was senior editor of Time Incorporated's People Magazine from its founding in February 1974 until 1986. He has also written for a wide range of publications, including The New York Times, the New York Daily News, Life, and Vanity Fair.

While his early nonfiction books veered from psychology (The Name Game) to true crime (The Serpent's Tooth) to art collecting (The Best of Everything, with former Sotheby's chairman John L. Marion), he is best known for his controversial biographies. Between 1991 and 2011, he published 14 New York Times bestselling biographies. Two of these—The Day Diana Died and The Day John Died—went to No.1. Andersen's second book about the relationship of President John F. Kennedy and First Lady Jacqueline Kennedy, These Few Precious Days: The Final Year of Jack with Jackie, was published to coincide with the 50th anniversary of JFK's assassination and also became a Top 10 New York Times bestseller, followed by The Good Son: JFK Jr. and the Mother He Loved in 2014. In 2016, Game of Crowns was published to mark Queen Elizabeth II's 90th birthday, becoming Andersen's 18th Times best seller. Following the death of Elizabeth II in 2022, Andersen published The King: The life of Charles III and four years later his biography of the Princess of Wales, KATE!: The Courage, Grace, and Power of the Woman Who Will Be Queen also became a national bestseller.

Before focusing on biographies, Anderson worked as an editor for the time magazine and the people magazine. He also was a writer for the New York Times, Life, and Vanity fair magazines.

Seven of Andersen's titles have also been selected for the Reader's Digest Today's Best Nonfiction Books of the Year series. In November 2008, NBC's Brian Williams presented Andersen with a Joan's Legacy Award for excellence in journalism regarding lung cancer, along with Ladies Home Journal, which excerpted the portion of his book Somewhere in Heaven: The Remarkable Love Story of Dana and Christopher Reeve describing Dana Reeve's battle with lung cancer. Madonna Unauthorized (1991) and The Day John Died (2000) were made into television films.

Andersen has made frequent appearances on TV programs such as the Today Show, Good Morning America, Entertainment Tonight, Larry King Live, The CBS Early Show, Dateline, Extra, The O'Reilly Factor, NBC Nightly News, ABC World News, 48 Hours, Inside Edition, Anderson Cooper 360 and Hardball.

Married since 1972 to former international banker Valerie Hess, Andersen resides in Connecticut. They have two daughters — former Bloomberg News White House correspondent and bestselling author (The Residence, First Women) Katharine Andersen Brower (born 1980) and artist Kelly Andersen (born 1990). In April 2016, Andersen's Game of Crowns and Brower's First Women were published within days of each other. At one point, father and daughter occupied five positions on the Times hardcover, ebook, and combined ebook and hardcover lists.

== Reviews ==
Assaying several Kennedy biographies, Larissa MacFarguhar wrote in the New York Times that Andersen's Jack and Jackie was "the most worth reading" and "comes closest to making Jackie sparkle". Of the sequel, Jackie After Jack: Portrait of The Lady, USA Today said "readers will be spellbound" while Newsweek called the book "poignant" and "intimate". The Day Diana Died was also a critical as well as commercial success, with Time describing the book as "swift and astounding reading", People calling it "riveting", the Washington Post citing its "breathless new details about the last hours of Diana's life" and the Chicago Sun-Times deeming the book "a fabulous, addictive read". In his review of George and Laura: Portrait of an American Marriage, Newsweek's critic wrote that "Andersen's insights can be as sharp as his details", while in its story on The Day John Died the Associated Press called Andersen "the master of the detail-packed tearjerker." Andersen wrote Mick: The Wild Life and Mad Genius of Jagger to mark the 50th anniversary of the Rolling Stones in July 2012. The book quickly became Andersen's 15th New York Times bestseller. In a review in The Guardian, Dorian Lynskey noted: "A book about a singer that pays no attention to his songs is simply an anthology of gossip, albeit juicy, unusually well-researched gossip.". However, the Daily Beast called Mick "brilliant" and Entertainment Weekly described it as "jam-packed with juiciness".

In a lengthy 1999 Salon review, Jake Tapper wrote of Bill and Hillary: The Marriage: "Andersen dishes like a catty high school girl holding forth in the lunchroom." But Tapper also stated that the book's "depiction of the Clintons' lopsided quid-pro-quo relationship meshes perfectly with the glimmers of insight the Clintons themselves have offered us", concluding that Bill and Hillary is "a guilty pleasure" and that in the end "the Clintons are getting the book they deserve." Similarly, in its review of Andersen's bestselling Streisand biography, Barbra: The Way She Is, the New York Times noted that Andersen "has a knack for ferreting memorable anecdotes of the 'no wire hangers' variety" while USA Today claimed the book "hits all the high notes" in Streisand's life story. Terry Hartle of the Christian Science Monitor wrote that Andersen's These Few Precious Days: The Last Year of Jack with Jackie was "fascinating and insightful" and Kirkus Reviews determined that The Good Son was "sensitive and astute, intimate" with "the power to mesmerize". Vanity Fair called Andersen's 2016 book Game of Crowns "catnip for royal watchers". A decade later, Bookreporter described Andersen's biography of Catherine, Princess of Wales as "an inspiring account of Kate with private views that are amusing, poignant, and sometimes even shocking. It gives readers a hint of a future work when Kate becomes queen."

== Works ==
- The Name Game (1977)
- Father (1983)
- The Serpent's Tooth (1986)
- Young Kate: Katharine Hepburn and the Making of an American Legend (1988)
- The Best of Everything (with John Marion) (1989)
- Citizen Jane (1990)
- Madonna: Unauthorized (1991)
- Jagger: Unauthorized (1993)
- Michael Jackson: Unauthorized (1994)
- Jack and Jackie: Portrait of an American Marriage (1996)
- An Affair to Remember: The Remarkable Love Story of Katharine Hepburn and Spencer Tracy (1997)
- Jackie After Jack: Portrait of the Lady (1998)
- The Day Diana Died (1998)
- Bill and Hillary: The Marriage (1999)
- The Day John Died (2000)
- Diana's Boys: William and Harry and the Mother They Loved (2001)
- George and Laura: Portrait of an American Marriage (2002)
- Sweet Caroline: Last Child of Camelot (2003)
- American Evita: Hillary Clinton's Path to Power (2004)
- Barbra: The Way She Is (2006)
- After Diana: William, Harry, Charles, and the Royal House of Windsor (2007)
- Somewhere in Heaven: The Remarkable Love Story of Dana and Christopher Reeve (2008)
- Barack and Michelle: Portrait of an American Marriage (2009)
- William and Kate: A Royal Love Story (2010)
- Mick: The Wild Life and Mad Genius of Jagger (2012)
- These Few Precious Days: The Final Year of Jack with Jackie (2013)
- Game of Crowns: Elizabeth, Camilla, Kate, and the Throne (2016)
- Brothers and Wives: Inside the Private Lives of William, Kate, Harry, and Meghan (2021)
- The King: The Life of Charles III (2022)
- Kate!: The Courage, Grace, and Power of the Woman Who Will Be Queen (2026)
