= Baby Tonight =

Studio album by Marlon Jackson
- Released: July 13, 1987
- Recorded: 1987
- Genre: R&B, soul
- Length: 46:28
- Label: Capitol
- Producer: Marlon Jackson; Fred Maher; Winston Johnson

Singles from Baby Tonight
- 1. "Baby Tonight" Released: June 30, 1987; 2. "Don't Go" Released: September 7, 1987

Baby Tonight is the only solo studio album by Marlon Jackson, released on July 13, 1987 by Capitol Records. It peaked at No. 22 on the Top R&B Albums chart in the United States. It was supported by the singles "Baby Tonight" and "Don't Go".

== Track listing ==
No.	Title	Writer(s)	Length
1.	"Don't Go"	Marlon Jackson	4:09
2.	"To Get Away"	Marlon Jackson, Fred Maher	4:32
3.	"When Will You Surrender"	Eric van Tijn, Jochem Fluitsma	3:34
4.	"Lovely Eyes"	Marlon Jackson	4:20
5.	"Baby Tonight"	Marlon Jackson	4:29
6.	"Something Coming Down"	Marlon Jackson, Fred Maher	4:00
7.	"Life"	Marlon Jackson, Bryan Loren	3:57
8.	"She Never Cried"	Fred Maher, Marlon Jackson	3:55
9.	"Talk 2-U"	Marlon Jackson	4:20
10.	"Where Do I Stand"	Marlon Jackson	4:43
11.	"Everyday Everynight"	Marlon Jackson	4:29
Total length:			46:28

== Personnel ==
- Marlon Jackson – vocals, keyboards, backing vocals
- Paul Jackson, Jr. – guitar on "Don't Go"
- Louis Johnson – bass
- Greg Phillinganes, John Barnes, Khris Kellow, Fred Maher, Winston Johnson – keyboards
- Fred Maher, Winston Johnson – drums
- The Grit Brothers, Sweet Lips – horns
- Gerald Albright – saxophone on "Don't Go"
- Carol Jackson – female voice
- Brittny Jackson, Valencia Jackson, Vesta Williams – backing vocals

Technical

- Wayne Edwards – executive producer
- Bill Bottrell, Fred Maher, Marlon Jackson, Paul Ericksen, Winston Johnson – engineers
- Andy Wallace, Bill Bottrell – mixing
- Aaron Rapoport – photography

== Charts ==
=== Weekly charts ===
Chart (1987)	Peak position
US Billboard 200	175
US Top R&B/Hip-Hop Albums (Billboard)	22

=== Year-end charts ===
Chart (1988)	Position
US Top R&B/Hip-Hop Albums (Billboard)	92
