= Michael Jackson: Unauthorized =

- Author: Christopher Andersen
- Publisher: Simon & Schuster
- Pages: 384
- ISBN: 0-671-89239-8

Michael Jackson: Unauthorized is a 1994 biography of the late pop star Michael Jackson, written by celebrity biographer Christopher Andersen.

== Development ==
According to Andersen, work started on the book in early 1991 when he received a call from a fellow journalist, who told him that two workers at Jackson's Neverland Ranch allegedly witnessed Jackson fondling a young celebrity. Andersen tried to interview Jackson several times, but was turned down. When Michael was publicly accused of child molestation in 1993, Andersen was told that he was under surveillance from investigators.

== Reception ==
The book was largely overlooked by the public. Dana Kennedy of Entertainment Weekly felt that, with its "killer material", Anderson "probably could have retired from the celebrity-bio grind for good" had it been released five years before. People magazine found it to be a "sad book", considering its dark revelations about Jackson's behaviour.
