= 2300 Jackson Street =

Studio album by the Jacksons
- Released: May 23, 1989
- Genres: R&B; new jack swing
- Length: 53:49; 152:28 (expanded edition)
- Labels: Epic; CBS
- Producers: The Jacksons; L.A. Reid; Babyface; Teddy Riley; Michael Omartian; Attala Zane Giles

The Jacksons chronology
Victory (1984)	2300 Jackson Street (1989)	The Essential Jacksons (2004)

Singles from 2300 Jackson Street
- 1. "Nothin' (That Compares 2 U)" Released: January 27, 1989; 2. "2300 Jackson Street" Released: April 16, 1989; 3. "Art of Madness" Released: June 25, 1989

2300 Jackson Street is the sixteenth and final studio album by the American group the Jacksons, and their final album for record label Epic, released in the United States on May 23, 1989. The album is named after the address of their childhood home.

With the exception of the title track, this is the group's first and only album produced without Michael and Marlon, both of whom left the group following the conclusion of their 1984 Victory Tour. The group's final album peaked at No. 59 on the US Billboard Top Pop Albums chart and at No. 14 on the US Top Black Albums chart, and sold over 500,000 copies worldwide.

== Overview ==
In a Billboard story June 17, 1989, about the release of 2300 Jackson Street, Jackie Jackson was quoted saying, "After the Victory album, our backs were against the wall... At first no one at CBS paid us any attention..." When the label heard "Alright with Me" and "If You'd Only Believe", they flew promotion staff for a meeting at Tito's Los Angeles home studio in a show of support.

The management firm of Fitzgerald-Hartley heard the album and approached the group about management. They had not managed a Black act since the Brothers Johnson. Comparing the Jacksons' without Michael to their former clients Rufus without Chaka Khan, they were quoted saying, "People quickly forget the group factor, which is what makes it all happen."

For the recording of the song "2300 Jackson Street", Michael recorded his vocals at the Encino house and Janet recorded her vocals at Marlon's home studio.

After the first week of release, the single "Nothin' (That Compares 2 U)" received playlist adds from 84% of black radio.

== Critical reception ==
Professional ratings
Review scores
Source	Rating
AllMusic	2.5/5 stars
Billboard	not rated
Hi-Fi News & Record Review	A:1
New Musical Express	3/10
Uncut	2/5 stars

The album received praise from music critics.

== Track listing ==
2300 Jackson Street track listing
No.	Title	Writer(s)	Producer(s)	Length
1.	"Art of Madness"	Jermaine Jackson, Michael Omartian, Bruce Sudano	Omartian	5:06
2.	"Nothin' (That Compares 2 U)"	Babyface, L.A. Reid	Reid, Babyface	5:22
3.	"Maria"	Jermaine Jackson, Paul Jackson Jr., Ray Grady	Jermaine Jackson	5:48
4.	"Private Affair"	Diane Warren	Omartian	4:10
5.	"2300 Jackson Street"	The Jacksons, Gene Griffin, Aaron Hall	The Jacksons, Griffin, Teddy Riley	5:06
6.	"Harley"	The Jacksons, Attala Zane Giles	The Jacksons; co-produced by Attala Zane Giles	4:24
7.	"She"	Griffin, Hall	Griffin, Riley	5:01
8.	"Alright with Me"	Jackie Jackson, Jermaine Jackson, Tito Jackson, Giles	The Jacksons, Giles	3:25
9.	"Play It Up"	The Jacksons, Giles	The Jacksons, Giles	4:52
10.	"Midnight Rendezvous"	The Jacksons, Giles	The Jacksons, Giles	4:24
11.	"If You'd Only Believe"	Jermaine Jackson, Billie Hughes, Roxanne Seeman	Omartian; co-produced by the Jacksons	6:13

== Personnel ==
=== Production ===
- Production: Michael Omartian (tracks 1, 4, 11), L.A. Reid and Babyface (track 2), Jermaine Jackson (track 3), The Jacksons (tracks 5, 6, 8–11), Teddy Riley and Gene Griffin (tracks 5, 7), Attala Zane Giles (tracks 6, 8–10)
- Arrangements: Michael Omartian (tracks 1, 4, 11), L.A. Reid and Babyface (track 2), Jermaine Jackson (track 3), The Jacksons (tracks 5, 6, 8–10), Teddy Riley (tracks 5, 7), Attala Zane Giles (tracks 6, 8–10)
- Engineers: David Alhert (tracks 1, 3–6, 8–11), Jon Gass (track 2), Mark Richmond (track 4), Mike Couzzi (track 4), Dennis Mitchell (tracks 5, 7), Jeff Lorenzen (track 5), Larry Fergusson (track 5), Marlon Jackson (track 5), Susan Rogers (tracks 6, 9, 10), Robert Brown (track 6), Keith Cohen (track 10)
- Assistant engineers: Pee Wee Jackson (tracks 1, 3–6, 8–11), Donnell Sullivan (track 2), Mike Spring (track 4), Jim Hanneman (track 7), Joe Schiff (track 8), Terry Christian (track 11)
- Mixing: Keith Cohen (tracks 1, 3–6, 9), L.A. Reid and Babyface (track 2), Jackie Jackson (tracks 3, 8), Susan Rogers (tracks 3, 9, 10), Larry Fergusson (tracks 5, 8), Dennis Mitchell (track 7), Michael Omartian (track 11)

=== Musicians ===
- Jermaine Jackson – lead vocals (1–6, 8–11), backing vocals (1–4, 6–11), percussion (3), finger snaps (11)
- Jackie Jackson – lead vocals (5, 8, 10, 11), backing vocals (1, 2, 6, 7, 9–11), percussion (10), finger snaps (11)
- Tito Jackson – lead vocals (1, 5), backing vocals (1, 2, 4, 6, 7, 9–11), motorcycle effects (6)
- Randy Jackson – lead vocals (2, 5, 7), backing vocals (1, 2, 6, 7, 9–11)
- Marlon Jackson – lead vocals (5)
- Michael Jackson – lead vocals (5)
- Janet Jackson – lead vocals (5)
- Rebbie Jackson – lead vocals (5)
- Siggy Jackson, Taj Jackson, Taryll Jackson, TJ Jackson, Valencia Jackson, Autumn Joi Jackson, Brandi Jackson, Brittny Jackson, Jaimy Jackson, Jeremy Jackson, Jermaine Jackson, Jr., Jourdynn Jackson, Marlon Jackson, Jr., Austin Brown, Stacee Brown, Yashi Brown – backing vocals (5)
- Alex Brown – backing vocals (4, 8, 10)
- Lynn Davis – backing vocals (4, 10)
- Ray Grady – dialogue (1)
- Teddy Riley – all instruments (5, 7)
- Erich Bulling – drum programming (1, 3, 8, 11), synthesizer programming (1, 3, 4, 8), effects (8), synthesizer (11)
- Attala Zane Giles – drum programming and bass synthesizer (6, 9), keyboards and synthesizer programming (9, 10)
- Jeff Lorber – synthesizer, drum programming and synthesizer programming (6), overdub keyboards (8)
- Michael Omartian – keyboards (1, 4), drum programming (4), piano (11), synthesizer programming (11), finger snaps (11)
- Babyface – keyboards and guitar (2)
- Ran Ballard – synthesizer programming (6, 9)
- Eugene A. Booker, Jr. – keyboards (3, 8)
- Rhett Lawrence – Fairlight programming (5)
- Julius W. Linsey – synthesizer (6)
- Donald Parks – synthesizer programming (2)
- Paul Jackson, Jr. – guitar (1, 3–5, 8–11)
- Nathan East – bass (9)
- Jonathan Moffett – drums (8, 9)
- L.A. Reid – drums and percussion (2)
- Jeff Porcaro – drums and drum programming (10)
- Paulinho da Costa – percussion (3, 9, 10)
- Larry Williams – saxophone (1, 4, 9), horn programming (8), horn arrangements (9)
- Don Myrick – saxophone (5)
- Chuck Findley – trumpet (9)
- Gary Grant – trumpet (9)
- Daniel Higgins – tenor saxophone (9)
- Bill Reichenbach Jr. – trombone (9)
- Lee Oskar – harmonica (3)
- Gene Thomason – motorcycle effects (6)

== Charts ==
Chart performance for 2300 Jackson Street
Chart (1989)	Peak position
Australian Albums (Kent Music Report)	81
Canadian Albums (RPM)	78
Dutch Albums (Album Top 100)	23
French Albums (SNEP)	44
German Albums (Offizielle Top 100)	21
Japanese Albums (Oricon)	96
Spanish Albums (AFE)	45
Swedish Albums (Sverigetopplistan)	35
Swiss Albums (Schweizer Hitparade)	21
UK Albums (OCC)	39
US Billboard Top Pop Albums	59
US Billboard Top Black Albums	14
Zimbabwean Albums (ZIMA)	1
