= Dynamite (Jermaine Jackson song) =

Single by Jermaine Jackson

from the album Jermaine Jackson
- B-side: "Tell Me I'm Not Dreamin' (Too Good to Be True) (Instrumental)"
- Released: April 4, 1984
- Recorded: 1984
- Genre: Synth-pop; R&B
- Length: 6:02
- Label: Arista; BMG
- Songwriters: Andy Goldmark, Bruce Roberts
- Producer: Jermaine Jackson

Jermaine Jackson singles chronology
"Very Special Part" (1982)	"Dynamite" (1984)	"Sweetest Sweetest" (1984)

Music video
- "Dynamite" on YouTube

"Dynamite" is a song recorded by American R&B singer Jermaine Jackson. It was released as the first single from his 1984 album, Jermaine Jackson. An instrumental version of the song, "Tell Me I'm Not Dreamin' (Too Good to Be True)", was released as the B-side. It was a #15 hit for him on the Billboard Hot 100 pop charts that year. It is also his first single to be released on Arista Records. The video was distributed to movie theaters by Music Motions.

== Background ==
"Dynamite" was released as the lead single from Jermaine Jackson's self-titled tenth studio album (released internationally as Dynamite). The track marked Jackson's debut release for Arista Records, ending his 13-year tenure with Motown. Arista's president, Clive Davis, heavily promoted the single to establish Jackson as a competitive solo pop artist. The physical B-side of the single featured an instrumental version of "Tell Me I'm Not Dreamin' (Too Good to Be True)", a duet on the album with his brother Michael Jackson. The instrumental was used because Michael's label, Epic Records, refused to allow the vocal version to be released as a commercial single to avoid competing with Thriller.

== Composition ==
"Dynamite" is an uptempo synth-pop, dance-pop, and contemporary R&B song written and composed by Andrew Goldmark and Bruce Roberts. Produced by Jermaine Jackson himself, the track relies heavily on mid-1980s electronic instrumentation, synthesizers, and intricate drum machine programming.

The song's signature driving electronic beat was programmed by Jonathan Moffett, the long-time live and studio session drummer for the Jackson family, who also toured extensively with Michael Jackson and Madonna. The track features a prominent bassline and rhythm guitar work by noted session musician Paul Jackson Jr. Lyrically, the song utilizes explosive metaphors to describe a passionate, high-energy romance, punctuated by the recurring hook in the chorus: "You are dynamite."

== Music video ==
The music video for "Dynamite" was a high-budget, cinematic production directed by Bob Giraldi, who had previously directed the iconic video for Michael Jackson's "Beat It". Featuring an elaborate storyline and complex group choreography, the video casts Jermaine as an inmate in a stylized, high-security prison. Jackson is shown planning and executing a dramatic prison break, backed by synchronized dance routines performed alongside a large ensemble of background dancers portraying fellow inmates.

In an unusual marketing move for the era, the music video was distributed directly to American movie theaters by Music Motions. It was screened prior to feature films as a theatrical short to generate commercial buzz before making its rotation debut on MTV. It was filmed in July 1984 at the Essex County Jail Annex in Caldwell, New Jersey.

== Personnel ==
- Jermaine Jackson – lead vocals, backing vocals, drum programming, arrangements
- John Barnes – keyboards, synthesizer bass
- Paul Jackson Jr. – guitar, arrangements
- Jonathan Moffett – drum programming

== Charts ==
=== Weekly charts ===
Chart (1984–85)	Peak position
Australia (Kent Music Report)	28
El Salvador (UPI)	8
Guatemala (UPI)	6
US Billboard Hot 100	15
US Dance Club Songs (Billboard)	20
US Hot R&B/Hip-Hop Songs (Billboard)	8

=== Year-end charts ===
Chart (1984)	Position
US Hot R&B/Hip-Hop Songs (Billboard)	50
