= Jermaine Jackson (album) =

Studio album by Jermaine Jackson
- Released: April 12, 1984
- Recorded: 1983–1984
- Studios: Soundcastle (Hollywood, California); Yamaha Recording Studios (Glendale, California); Can-Am Recorders (Tarzana, California); Lion Share Studios (Los Angeles, California)
- Genres: R&B; new wave; synth-pop
- Length: 43:09 (original release); 77:05 (expanded edition)
- Labels: Arista; BMG
- Producers: Jermaine Jackson; Michael Omartian; Richard Rudolph; Jack White

Jermaine Jackson chronology
Let Me Tickle Your Fancy (1982)	Jermaine Jackson (1984)	Precious Moments (1986)

Singles from Jermaine Jackson
- 1. "Dynamite" Released: April 4, 1984; 2. "Sweetest Sweetest" Released: May 1984 (UK); 3. "When the Rain Begins to Fall" Released: July 13, 1984; 4. "Do What You Do" Released: October 1984 (US)

Jermaine Jackson (released internationally as Dynamite) is the tenth studio album by American singer Jermaine Jackson, released in 1984. It was his debut album with Arista after leaving Motown. The album features then-unknown Whitney Houston and his brothers Michael, Tito and Randy.

Overall, it stands as one of Jermaine Jackson's most commercially successful albums, selling over 900,000 copies in the US to date and being certified Gold by the Recording Industry Association of America (RIAA).

== Background and release ==
Jermaine Jackson was Jackson's first of numerous albums released with Arista Records, after leaving Motown, who he had been with for thirteen years. The album was released internationally under the title Dynamite. The album was re-issued in 2005 in the US with little difference compared to the original album. It was reissued again in Japan in 2009 with "When the Rain Begins to Fall" and two bonus tracks, and again in the US in 2012. This edition also contained "When the Rain Begins to Fall", both bonus tracks on the Japanese edition, as well as three more bonus tracks.

== Singles ==
"Dynamite" was released as the album's first single, and became Jackson's fourth top 20-charting single, reaching No. 15 on the Billboard Hot 100. Internationally, the song performed less well, reaching No. 46 in France, and No. 19 in New Zealand. "Do What You Do", the album's second single, performed as one of Jackson's best-selling singles to date, reaching the top 20 in the US, as well as topping the Belgium (Flanders) chart, and reaching the top ten in Ireland, Netherlands, and the UK, where it was certified Silver by the BPI. It also reached #40 in Germany, and #12 in France.

"When the Rain Begins to Fall", a duet with Pia Zadora, was originally recorded for the soundtrack of Voyage of the Rock Aliens, and went on to become one of both artists' best-selling singles. Although less successful in the US and UK (respectively peaking at No. 54 and No. 68), the song topped the charts of numerous European territories, including Belgium (Flanders), Netherlands, and France. The song also peaked within the top ten of Austria, Switzerland, and Italy. The song also went Gold in Germany, and Platinum in France. Due to the success of the single, it was included on later pressings of the album.

== Content ==
The album track "Take Good Care of My Heart," a duet with the then relatively unknown American R&B and pop singer Whitney Houston, was also the B-Side of the released "Dynamite" single. The song later appeared on Houston's self-titled debut album, released February 14, 1985 on Arista Records.

The track "Escape from the Planet of the Ant Men" contains backing vocals by Jermaine's brothers Tito and Randy.

== Reception ==
The album went on to be Jermaine's second-most successful album in the United States, peaking at No. 19 — 13 places below Let's Get Serious — on the main Billboard album chart, but becoming the #1 R&B album on July 7, 1984.

The disc achieved Gold status, eventually surpassing 900,000 in US sales. Internationally, it was Jackson's most successful album, peaking within the charts of four non-US territories. "When the Rain Begins to Fall", originally recorded for the soundtrack of Voyage of the Rock Aliens, was later included on the album after its success as a single.

=== Critical response ===
Professional ratings
Review scores
Source	Rating
AllMusic	4/5 stars
Record Mirror	1/5 stars
Smash Hits	7/10

Jason Elias from AllMusic gave the album a retrospective positive track-by-track view, saying "[Jermaine Jackson] has him doing a slickly produced variant of the R&B/pop his brother was making sound effortless." and concluded "While Jermaine Jackson's not a perfect album, despite the ground covered, it is a strong one."

== Track listing ==
Original International Edition: Dynamite
No.	Title	Writer(s)	Length
1.	"Dynamite"	Andrew Goldmark, Bruce Roberts	6:01
2.	"Sweetest Sweetest"	Arthur Jacobson, Ellison Chase, Robin Lerner	4:05
3.	"Tell Me I'm Not Dreamin' (Too Good to Be True)" (featuring Michael Jackson)	Bruce Sudano, Jay Gruska, Michael Omartian	4:22
4.	"Escape from the Planet of the Ant Men" (featuring Tito Jackson and Randy Jackson)	David Batteau, Don Freeman	5:04
5.	"Come to Me (One Way or Another)"	Jermaine Jackson	5:17
6.	"Do What You Do"	Larry Di Tomaso, Ralph Dino	4:46
7.	"Take Good Care of My Heart" (duet with Whitney Houston)	Peter McCann, Steve Dorff	4:17
8.	"Some Things are Private"	Sudano, Omartian	4:05
9.	"Oh Mother"	Elliot Willensky, Jackson	4:48

Re-release: Jermaine Jackson
No.	Title	Writer(s)	Length
1.	"Dynamite"	Goldmark, Roberts	6:01
2.	"Sweetest Sweetest"	Jacobson, Chase, Lerner	4:05
3.	"Tell Me I'm Not Dreaming (Too Good To Be True)" (featuring Michael Jackson)	Sudano, Gruska, Omartian	4:22
4.	"Escape from the Planet of the Ant Men" (featuring Tito Jackson and Randy Jackson)	Batteau, Don Freeman	5:04
5.	"When the Rain Begins to Fall" (duet with Pia Zadora)	Michael Bradley, Peggy March, Steve Wittmack	4:06
6.	"Come to Me (One Way or Another)"	Jackson	5:17
7.	"Do What You Do"	Tomaso, Dino	4:46
8.	"Take Good Care of My Heart" (duet with Whitney Houston)	McCann, Dorff	4:17
9.	"Some Things are Private"	Sudano, Omartian	4:05
10.	"Oh Mother"	Willensky, Jackson	4:48

Japanese re-release
No.	Title	Writer(s)	Length
11.	"Dynamite" (12" Mix)	Goldmark, Roberts	7:49
12.	"Do What You Do" (Club Mix)	Tomaso, Dino	5:38

US re-release
No.	Title	Writer(s)	Length
11.	"Sweetest Sweetest" (Special U.S. Remix)	Jacobson, Chase, Lerner	5:24
12.	"Come to Me (One Way or Another)" (12" Remix Version)	Jackson	5:24
13.	"Do What You Do" (12" Remix Version)	Tomaso, Dino	5:44
14.	"Dynamite" (12" Remix Version)	Goldmark, Roberts	7:45
15.	"When the Rain Begins to Fall" (with Pia Zadora) (12" Vocal Version With Breakdown)	Bradley, March, Wittmack	5:24

== Personnel ==
Musicians and Vocalists

- Jermaine Jackson – lead vocals, backing vocals, drum programming (1, 2), percussion (2–4, 6), keyboards (6), synthesizer bass (6), drum machine programming (6)
- John Barnes – keyboards (1, 2, 4, 7), synthesizer bass (1, 4), Yamaha GS1 (10), Fairlight strings (10)
- Michael Omartian – keyboards (3, 9), percussion (3), bass (9), backing vocals (9)
- David Ervin – keyboards (7)
- Derek Nakamoto – keyboards (7)
- Michael Sembello – Yamaha GS1 (7), bass (7), drum programming (7)
- Greg Phillinganes – keyboards (8)
- Elliot Willensky – acoustic piano (10)
- Paul Jackson Jr. – guitars (1, 2, 4, 7)
- Ray Parker Jr. – guitars (3)
- Gregg Arreguin – guitars (4)
- David Williams – guitars (6, 8)
- George Doering – sitar (6)
- Marcus Daniels – guitars (7)
- Michael Landau – guitars (9)
- Freddie Washington – bass (2)
- Nathan East – bass (3, 8)
- Ronnie Foster – synthesizer bass (6)
- Jonathan Moffett – Simmons drum programming (1)
- John Robinson – drums (3, 8)
- Don Freeman – drum programming (4)
- Mike Baird – drums (8)
- Randy Jackson – percussion (2), additional backing vocals (4)
- Ernie Watts – saxophone solo (8, 9)
- George Del Barrio – strings (8)
- Whitney Houston – backing vocals (2, 8), lead vocals (8)
- Michael Jackson – lead vocals (3)
- Tito Jackson – additional backing vocals (4)
- Bill Bottrell – additional backing vocals (4)
- KC – additional backing vocals (4)
- Pia Zadora – lead vocals (5)
- Portia Griffin – backing vocals (9)
- Yolanda Denise Young – backing vocals (9)

Music arrangements

- Jermaine Jackson – arrangements (1, 2)
- Paul Jackson Jr. – arrangements (1, 2)
- Michael Omartian – arrangements (3, 8, 9)
- Don Freeman – arrangements (4)
- George Del Barrio – string arrangements (6)
- Michael Sembello – arrangements (7)
- Greg Phillinganes – arrangements (8)
- Elliot Willensky – arrangements (10)

== Production ==
- Clive Davis – executive producer
- Jermaine Jackson – producer (1, 2, 4, 6, 7, 8, 10)
- Michael Omartian – producer (3, 9)
- Richard Rudolph – producer (4, 7)
- Jack White – producer (5)
- Bill Bottrell – mixing, engineer
- John Guess – engineer
- Brian Malouf – engineer
- Mike Schumann – engineer
- Keith Seppanen – engineer
- Ria Lewerke – art direction, design
- Leon Lecash – photography

== Charts ==
Chart performance for Jermaine Jackson
Chart (1984)	Peak position
Australian Albums (Kent Music Report)	65
Dutch Albums (Album Top 100)	21
New Zealand Albums (RMNZ)	38
Swedish Albums (Sverigetopplistan)	27
UK Albums (Official Charts)	57
US Billboard 200	19
US Top R&B/Hip-Hop Albums (Billboard)	1

== Certifications ==
Region	Certification	Certified units/sales
Canada (Music Canada)	Gold	50,000^{^}
United States (RIAA)	Gold	900,000
^{^} Shipments figures based on certification alone.
