= Nothin' (That Compares 2 U) =

1989 single by the Jacksons

Single by The Jacksons

from the album 2300 Jackson Street
- B-side: "Alright With Me"
- Released: January 27, 1989
- Recorded: 1988
- Genre: New jack swing; R&B; pop; funk
- Length: 5:22 (album version); 4:31 (7" edit)
- Label: Epic
- Songwriters: L.A. Reid; Babyface
- Producers: L.A. Reid; Babyface

The Jacksons singles chronology
"Body" (1984)	"Nothin' (That Compares 2 U)" (1989)	"2300 Jackson Street" (1989)

Music video
- "Nothin' (That Compares 2 U)" on YouTube

"Nothin' (That Compares 2 U)" was the first single released from The Jacksons' album 2300 Jackson Street. The song was co-written by L. A. Reid and Babyface. "Nothin' (That Compares 2 U)" is considered one of The Jacksons' last successful singles before the group's breakup, peaking at #4 on the US Billboard R&B Singles chart. It became the group's last Top 40 hit in Britain, peaking at #33 on the UK Charts. This would be their only hit song to date, without their brothers Marlon and Michael. A music video was produced to promote the single.

== Mixes ==
- Album version (5:22)
- 7" edit (4:13)
- Extended version (7:42)
- Sensitive Vocal Mix (6:00)
- The Mix (7:05)
- Choice Dub (5:50)
- Bass World Dub (5:50)

== Personnel ==
- Jermaine Jackson, Steven Randall Jackson: Lead Vocals
- The Jacksons: Background Vocals
- L.A. Reid: Drums, Percussions
- Babyface: Keyboards, Electric Bass, Guitar, Soloist
- Donald K. Parks: Synthesizer [Fairlight CMI]

== Charts ==
Chart (1989)	Peak position
ARIA Singles Chart	89
Belgian Singles Chart (Flanders)	17
Chile Singles Chart	24
Dutch Singles Chart	18
German Singles Chart	26
New Zealand Singles Chart	16
Swiss Singles Chart	24
UK Singles Chart	33
US Billboard Hot 100	77
US Billboard R&B Singles chart	4
