= Jackie Jackson =

American singer (born 1951)

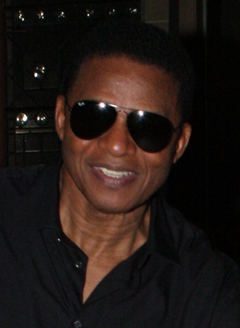
- Jackson in 2013
- Born: Sigmund Esco Jackson; May 4, 1951 (age 75); Gary, Indiana, U.S.
- Occupations: Singer; songwriter
- Years active: 1964–present
- Spouses: Enid Adren Spann (m. 1974; div. 1987) Victoria Triggs (m. 2001; div. 2007) Emily Besselink (m. 2012)
- Children: 4
- Parents: Joe Jackson; Katherine Jackson
- Family: Jackson
- Musical career
- Genres: Pop; R&B; soul
- Instruments: Vocals; percussion
- Labels: Steeltown; Motown; Epic; Polydor; PolyGram
- Member of: The Jacksons
- Formerly of: The Jackson 5

Sigmund Esco "Jackie" Jackson (born May 4, 1951) is an American singer. He is a founding member and the sole constant member of the Jackson 5, for which he was inducted into the Rock and Roll Hall of Fame in 1997. He is the second child and oldest son of the Jackson family, and the oldest Jackson brother.

== Early life ==
Sigmund Esco Jackson was born at St. Mary's Mercy Hospital in Gary, Indiana, on his mother Katherine's (May 4, 1930) 21st birthday in 1951. He was given the nickname Jackie by his grandfather, Samuel Jackson. He and his siblings (Rebbie, Tito, Jermaine, La Toya, Marlon, Michael, Randy, and Janet) were brought up in a two-bedroom house in Gary, Indiana, an industrial steel city south of Chicago. His father, Joseph "Joe" Jackson (July 26, 1928 – June 27, 2018), worked at a steel mill, and at night he played in an R&B band called the Falcons with his brother, Luther. Their mother, Katherine, a Jehovah's Witness, played the clarinet, cello, and piano. His father formed the Jackson Brothers singing group, which included Jackie and his brothers Tito and Jermaine. Younger brothers Marlon and Michael played assorted percussive instruments.

By 1964, Joe made Michael the lead singer forming the Jackson 5, after Katherine discovered that Michael could sing. The brothers rehearsed every day after school under Joe's lead, keeping themselves busy and out of trouble. Joe saw that their talent could get them out of Gary. Jackie gives his mother credit saying "there wouldn't have been The Jackson 5 without her". Katherine used to sing harmonies with the brothers. Within two years, the group emerged professionally, signing with Motown in 1968. Before the group signed with Motown, Jackie wanted to pursue a career in professional baseball.

== Career ==
=== The Jackson 5 ===
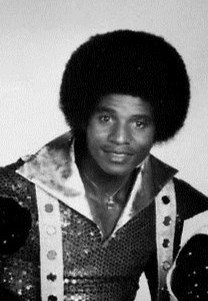
Jackie Jackson in 1977

Jackie performed with a high tenor singing voice. He had the highest and lightest natural speaking and singing voice of all the brothers. He added brief lead parts in some of the Jackson 5's hit singles, including "I Want You Back" and "ABC". When the Jackson 5 became the Jacksons after leaving Motown for CBS Records in 1976, Jackson's role as a vocalist and songwriter increased. He added a lead vocal alongside Michael on their Top 10 Epic single "Enjoy Yourself", and also added composition on six of the group's albums with Epic. Jackson's voice changed to a lower tenor vocal style during the Epic years. One of his most successful compositions, "Can You Feel It", co-written with Michael, became an international hit in 1981. Jackson began performing more lead vocals as Michael pursued a solo career. On their 1984 album Victory, Jackie performed lead on the song "Wait" and wrote the single "Torture". Before the start of the Victory Tour in 1984, he suffered a knee injury during rehearsals. Jackie recovered well enough to perform on the last leg of shows in December 1984 in Los Angeles, where Michael announced he was leaving the group. In early 1985, Marlon left the group as well. Jackie, Tito and Randy became session musicians, vocalists and producers during this time.

In 1987, Jackie, Randy, Tito and Jermaine reunited and recorded "Time Out for the Burglar", the theme song for the film Burglar. The single was a minor R&B hit in the US, but had more success in Belgium where it peaked in the Top 40 at #17 for two consecutive weeks. The Jacksons also contributed backing vocals to the Tito-produced title track of Tramaine Hawkins's 1987 album Freedom. In late 1988, the Jacksons set out to record their final album, 2300 Jackson Street, on which Jackie and Jermaine split leads on the songs. 2300 Jackson Street failed to chart, despite the Randy and Jermaine-led hit "Nothin' (That Compares 2 U)". Randy did not participate in much of the album's promotion as he was working on his solo project, leaving Jackie, Tito and Jermaine to promote the album mostly overseas. Afterwards, each brother focused on solo projects. In 2001, after years out of the limelight, Jackie and his brothers gave a reunion performance with Michael during his 30th-anniversary special at Madison Square Garden.

=== Solo career ===
In 1973, Jackie released his self-titled debut solo album, Jackie Jackson, through Motown while still active with the Jackson 5. The album failed to chart, and he did not release another solo album for 16 years, continuing to focus on his work with the group. In September 1989, Jackie signed with Polydor and released his second solo album, Be the One, co-writing and co-producing several of its tracks. The album was a minor hit, peaking at #89 on the Billboard Top R&B Albums chart. It was preceded by two singles: "Stay," which peaked at #39 on the R&B chart, and "Cruzin'," which reached #58. After another lengthy hiatus from solo releases, Jackson returned in November 2010 with the independent single "We Know What's Going On," released through his own label, Siggy Music.

=== Later work ===
Later in 2002, residing in Las Vegas, Jackie founded and ran two record companies, Jesco Records and Futurist Entertainment. His son Sigmund Jr., known as DEALZ, released a mixtape on Jesco in 2007. In 2009, Jackie, Tito, Jermaine and Marlon starred in the reality series The Jacksons: A Family Dynasty which Jackie executive produced. In 2012, the quartet began their first tour since the Victory Tour in 1984. In 2017, Jackie signed the EDM meets hip-hop musical duo Gold Lemonade consisting of France born DJ/producer Lya Lewis and Caribbean rooted frontman Jvgg Spvrrow to his label Critically Amused, after having met Lya in Las Vegas in 2015. Jackie also signed St. Lucian artist D.B.L., a long time friend of the Jackson family. Jackie mentored D.B.L. as a child performer (then known as Donny B. Lord), helping to shape his career and introducing him to his brother, Michael Jackson.

Besides his music career, Jackie co-founded, alongside Robert Milder, the sustainable furniture brand Hayvenhurst.

In September 2025 Jackie, along with his brother Marlon, performed at the Reform UK Party Conference at the NEC Birmingham.

== Personal life ==
Jackie has been married three times and has four children. He married his first wife, Enid Arden Spann, in November 1974 after a 5-year courtship. They separated in 1984 and Enid filed for divorce, but they reconciled in 1985. In January 1986, Enid filed for divorce for the final time. She received a restraining order against Jackson after alleging that he was physically abusive. Enid died from a brain aneurysm in 1997. Together, they had two children: Sigmund Esco "Siggy" Jackson Jr. (born June 29, 1977) and Brandi Jackson (born February 6, 1982).

In 2001, Jackie married his second wife, Victoria Triggs. They later divorced. Jackson married his third wife, Emily Besselink, in 2012, who gave birth to twin boys. The twins names are River T Jackson and Jaylen Milan Jackson. They were born on December 31, 2013.

== Discography ==
=== Studio albums ===
Title	Album details	Peak chart positions
Title	Album details	US R&B
Jackie Jackson	Released: October 14, 1973; Label: Motown; Formats: LP	—
Be the One	Released: September 9, 1989; Label: Polydor; Formats: LP, CD	84
"—" denotes items which were not released in that country or failed to chart.

=== Singles ===
==== As main artist ====
Title	Year	Peak chart positions	Album
Title	Year	US R&B	Album
"Thanks to You"	1973	—	Jackie Jackson
"Cruzin'"	1989	58	Be the One
"Stay"	1989	39	Be the One
"We Know What's Going On"	2010	—	Non-album single
"—" denotes items which were not released in that country or failed to chart.

==== As a featured artist ====
Title	Year
"That's How I Feel" (DealZ featuring Jackie Jackson & Jermaine Jackson)	2011
