= Marlon Jackson =

American singer and dancer (born 1957)

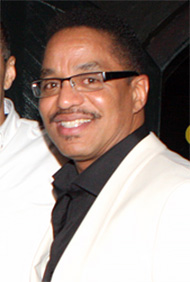
- Jackson in 2013
- Born: Marlon David Jackson; March 12, 1957 (age 69); Gary, Indiana, U.S.
- Occupations: Musician; singer; dancer
- Years active: 1964–present
- Spouse: Carol Parker (m. 1975)
- Children: 3
- Parents: Joe Jackson; Katherine Jackson
- Family: Jackson
- Musical career
- Genres: Pop; R&B; soul
- Instruments: Vocals; percussion; keyboards; synthesizers
- Labels: Steeltown; Motown; Epic; Capitol
- Member of: The Jacksons
- Formerly of: The Jackson 5

Marlon David Jackson (born March 12, 1957) is an American singer and dancer best known as a member of the Jackson 5. He is the sixth child and middle son of the Jackson family. Jackson now runs Study Peace Foundation to promote peace and unity worldwide.

== Early life ==
Marlon David Jackson was born on March 12, 1957, at St. Mary's Mercy Hospital in Gary, Indiana. He was the sixth child and middle son of Joseph, a steel mill worker and player in an R&B band (the Falcons, with his brother Luther), and Katherine Jackson, a Jehovah's Witness. He was born one and a half years earlier than his younger brother Michael (August 29, 1958 – June 25, 2009). Growing up, Jackson was especially close to Michael, whom he considered the substitute for his lost twin brother, Brandon, who died shortly after birth. "We were the jokers of the family," Jackson said.

By 1964, Jackson and Michael joined their brothers Tito, Jackie and Jermaine, forming the group the Jackson 5. Their mother, Katherine, played the piano, cello, and clarinet, and sang harmonies with the brothers. Their father, Joe, led the rehearsals, keeping them off the street and away from trouble. They won singing competitions all over the state as well as in New York. That marked the beginning of their career. Jackson was not the most prominent member of the Jackson 5, though he did sing background vocals on many of their hits. He also played the conga and tambourine. Brother Randy later joined the band when Jermaine chose to stay at Motown after the group left the label and renamed themselves the Jacksons. Jackson has three sisters: Rebbie, La Toya and Janet.

== Career ==
=== The Jackson 5 ===
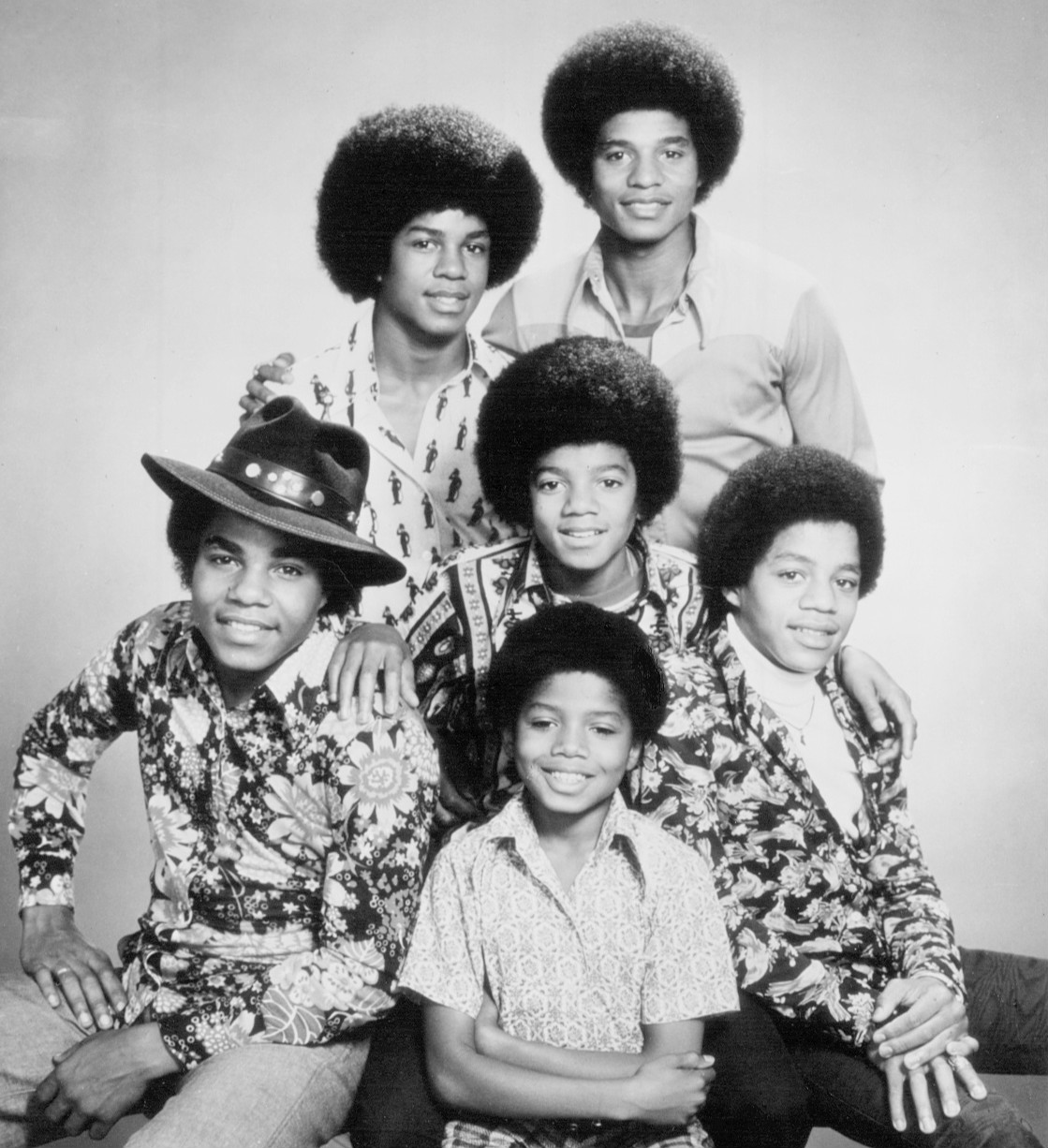
Marlon (far right) and his brothers (1974)

Jackson and his brothers first signed as the Jackson 5 with Gordon Keith of Steeltown Records in November 1967, and their first single "Big Boy", was released on January 31, 1968. After the group recorded three more songs with the Steeltown label (on two records) they were signed with Berry Gordy of Motown Records in 1969. Not feeling that they were being paid fair royalties by Motown Records for their success as well as their desire for creative control, the Jackson 5 decided to leave the label and sign with Epic Records in 1975. Jermaine split from the Jackson Five to start a solo career at Motown, and was replaced by his brother Randy. Unbeknownst to the group, Gordy had trademarked the name The Jackson Five and did not allow the group to continue using the name when they left the label. Once signed with Epic, the group became known simply as The Jacksons. In 1983, Gordy asked the group to perform at the Motown 25: Yesterday, Today, Forever television special. In 1997, he was inducted into the Rock and Roll Hall of Fame in 1997 with his brothers. In 2001, he reunited with his brothers to perform for the Michael Jackson: 30th Anniversary Celebration. Jackson was voiced by Edmund Sylvers in the 1971-1972 animated series Jackson 5ive and was portrayed by Marcus Maurice, Jacen Wilkerson and Floyd Myers Jr. in the 1992 miniseries The Jacksons: An American Dream and by Tre Horton and Jaylen Lyndon Hunter in the 2026 film Michael.

=== Solo career ===
Like Michael and Jermaine, Jackson began a solo career, releasing the album Baby Tonight in 1987. Despite Baby Tonight reaching No. 22 on the Top R&B Albums chart in the United States, Jackson has not released another album since then.

=== Later work ===
Jackson was successful within real estate in Southern California. In 1999, Jackson started running The Major Broadcasting Corporation (MBC) along with Florida attorney Willie E. Gary, baseball player Cecil Fielder, boxer Evander Holyfield and Alvin James. MBC was a religious network based in Atlanta. On October 1, 2004, they rebranded as Black Family Channel. In May 2007, the Black Family Channel was sold to the Gospel Music Channel, now known as Up TV. In 2008, Jackson and a board of new partners founded the Motherland Group LLC; its purpose is to bring recognition to ancient Badagry, Nigeria for education and tourism, while preserving its history.

Jackson now runs the Study Peace Foundation, founded in 2015, aimed to promote peace and unity in communities worldwide offering programs designed to engage children, adults and the elderly to live in peaceful environments. "As a community we all should know that promoting peace and unity would cause a chain reaction that children will observe. It all starts with what we make accessible to the children," he said. The foundation went into a partnership with KABOOM! to build playgrounds in New Orleans, Gary and Los Angeles. In September 2025, Jackson and his brother Jackie performed at the Reform UK Party Conference at the NEC Birmingham.

== Personal life ==
=== Family ===
In August 1975, 18-year-old Jackson married his girlfriend, Carol Ann Parker, whom he met in New Orleans during one of the Jacksons' tours. Jackson and Parker have three children:

- Valencia Caroline Jackson (born December 18, 1976)
- Brittany Shauntee Jackson (born April 15, 1978)
- Marlon David Jackson Jr. (born September 23, 1981)

Marlon and Carol have six grandchildren, two from Valencia and four from Brittany.

=== Michael's memorial ===
On July 7, 2009, at the Michael Jackson memorial service held at the Staples Center, Jackson and his family offered their final eulogies for Michael after his death, saying he was the "soul" of the family, addressing the crowd: "Maybe now, Michael, they will leave you alone" and "I would like for you to give our brother, my twin brother, Brandon, a hug for me." Jackson said, "I love you, Michael, and I'll miss you." In honor of Michael, Jackson and his brothers, Tito, Jackie, Jermaine and Randy Jackson served as pallbearers wearing a gold necktie, a single white glove and sunglasses.

In a 2019 Rolling Stone interview, Jackson was vocal about the allegations against his brother Michael detailed in the documentary Leaving Neverland, saying "if your brother was deceased and someone wanted to slander his name, you'd be supporting him. That's not him. That's not his character. We definitely know our brother, and there are no facts whatsoever to corroborate these allegations." He continues, "It's a quick money grab. That's all it is."

=== Health ===
In November 2026, Jackson revealed he had been diagnosed with stage-4 prostate cancer four years prior.

== Discography ==
=== Studio albums ===
Title	Album details	Peak chart positions	
Title	Album details	US	US R&B
Baby Tonight	Released July 13, 1987; Label: Capitol; Formats: LP, CD	175	22

=== Singles ===
Title	Year	Peak chart positions	Album
Title	Year	US R&B	Album
"(Let Your Love Find) The Chosen One"	1986	—	The Golden Child
"Baby Tonight"	1987	57	Baby Tonight
"Don't Go"	1987	2	Baby Tonight
"—" denotes items which were not released in that country or failed to chart.

=== Other contributions ===
- 1980: La Toya Jackson – La Toya Jackson
- 1981: My Special Love – La Toya Jackson
- 1983: Wright Back at You – Betty Wright
- 1983: Respect – Billy Griffin
- 1984: Heart Don't Lie – La Toya Jackson
- 1984: Dream Street – Janet Jackson
- 1985: "We Are the World" – USA for Africa
- 1986: The Golden Child Soundtrack.
- 1989: 2300 Jackson Street – The Jacksons featuring Michael Jackson, Janet Jackson, Rebbie Jackson and Marlon Jackson.
- 2011: "Letter in the Sky" – Ai featuring The Jacksons
- 2021: "Love One Another" – Tito Jackson featuring Marlon Jackson, Stevie Wonder, Kenny Neal and Bobby Rush
