= The Jackson 5 World Tour =

1973–75 concert tour by the Jackson 5

- Tour by the Jackson 5
- Poster to the concert in Pittsburgh, USA
- Location: Africa; Asia; Latin America; North America; Oceania
- Associated albums: Skywriter; G.I.T.: Get It Together; Dancing Machine; Moving Violation
- Start date: March 2, 1973
- End date: November 30, 1975
- No. of shows: 380+
- Supporting acts: Commodores; Tavares; Ohio Players; B. T. Express

The Jackson 5 tour chronology
- The Jackson 5 European Tour (1972); The Jackson 5 World Tour (1973–1975); The Jackson 5 Final Tour (1976)

The Jackson 5 World Tour was the fifth overall concert tour and the first world tour undertaken by the American band the Jackson 5, promoting their albums Skywriter (1973), G.I.T.: Get It Together (1973), Dancing Machine (1974) and Moving Violation (1975).

The tour began on March 2, 1973, in Oklahoma City, Oklahoma, and concluded sometime in late December 1975. The tour was the biggest undertaken by the Jackson 5 during the band's lifetime, with over 385 concerts in a three-year period. The brothers toured the cities of the Americas, the United Kingdom, the Far East (including Japan, Philippines, Australia, New Zealand and a few others) and Africa.

Joe Jackson arranged a nightclub act or also known as their "Las Vegas Revue" debuting at then MGM Grand Hotel & Casino in Las Vegas, Nevada. The act soon expanded to other states such as New York, California, Maryland and few other places in between.

This marks the last tour before they toured as six brothers again for the Victory Tour in 1984.

== Overview ==
=== 1973 ===
==== Japan ====
The brothers arrived at the Tokyo International Airport on April 23, 1973, due to the tour originally being scheduled on April 25. During their visit, they resided at the Takanawa Prince Hotel. This would be their first time touring Japan. On April 24, the brothers attended a press conference regarding the Tokyo Music Festival and their upcoming performance on a television show. The Japanese leg of the tour began on April 27 with a performance at the Imperial Theatre in Tokyo as part of the Tokyo Music Festival, as special guests. Before their first show, a rehearsal and soundcheck commenced; the brothers had only rehearsed half of the set list. They attended an afterparty where they spend time with Sammy Davis Jr. and his wife, Altovise, as he was performing there as well. The brothers intended to come back to Japan sometime in 1974, but these plans were cancelled for unknown reasons. Michael would eventually come back to Japan during his first solo tour – the Bad World Tour – in September 1987.

==== Australia and New Zealand ====
The Jackson 5 were considered the first black group to tour Australia. The brothers attracted crowds in populous cities in Australia at smaller auditoriums and arenas. In Sydney, Joe Jackson, who was the group's tour and finance manager, stood up for Aboriginal fans who were allegedly banned from interacting with the group during their stay. Jackie recalls his father saying, "If you don't let these Aboriginal kids in, the Jacksons are not going on stage." They were eventually let in, causing pandemonium. Wendell Hynes was the group's tour manager and promoter when the Jacksons came to New Zealand; his brother, Jeff Hynes, was the security and driver. The brothers spent four-and-a-half days in New Zealand with two shows in Christchurch and two shows in Wellington.

=== 1974 ===
==== North America ====
On May 13, before the concert in Washington, D.C., around 300 people tried to get in without tickets. After being denied access, they started a ruckus by throwing bottles and rocks at cars for the next four hours. According to the police, 40 people had been injured and 58 others were arrested, 27 of whom were adults while the rest of them were juveniles.

==== Start of Las Vegas Revue ====
The night before the opening show at the MGM Grand Hotel, Rebbie wrenched her ankle while climbing down the stairs of the hotel's casino, resulting in the group dropping down her performance of "Fever" from the setlist for the two-week engagement. Nevertheless, she came on stage at the end of every show.

Katherine Jackson explains:

As for LaToya and Rebbie, it was decided that each would dance, LaToya in the tap-dancing segment, Rebbie during her performance of the old Peggy Lee hit "Fever", with Michael and Marlon.

Unfortunately, because of a freak accident, the only appearance that Rebbie wound up making onstage at the MGM Grand came at the end of the show, when the children took their bows. The night before the engagement began, she was walking down the stairs into the hotel's casino holding Stacee's hand, when Stacee suddenly jumped down a couple of stairs. Rebbie had to lurch forward, and, in doing so, she wrenched her ankle. She was heartbroken that she wasn't able to perform.

As it turned out, that was the only disappointment with the engagement. "This is the best show I've ever seen in Vegas!" dozens of audience members exclaimed to Joe and me during those two weeks. Everyone knew who we were because the children made a point of introducing us from the stage, always against my objections.

— My Family, The Jacksons, 1990

==== Africa ====
The tour was organised by Mamadou Johnny Secka. Originally, it was scheduled to take place from January 29 to February 18, including performances in Ghana, Nigeria, Zambia, Kenya and Ethiopia, but was cut short to only one week in Senegal, where the group performed one show in Demba Diop Stadium and two shows in a small theatre.

When we came off the plane in Dakar, Senegal, Africa, we were greeted by a long line of African dancers. Their drums and sounds filled the air with rhythm. I was going crazy, I was screaming, "All right! They got the rhythm... This is it. This is where I come from. The origin."

— Michael Jackson for Ebony magazine, 1984

During their free time the Jacksons took a trip to the market of Fadiouth to buy local pieces of art, and then to Club Aldiana in Nianing for lunch. They also visited Linguere before going to a pilgrimage in Gorée.

From Michael's own words:

And the craftspeople in the marketplace were incredible. People were making things as we watched and selling other things. I remember one man who made beautiful wood carvings. He'd ask you what you wanted and you'd say, "A man's face," and he'd take a piece from a tree trunk, slice it, and create this remarkable face. You could watch him do it right before your eyes. I'd just sit there and watch people step up to ask him to make something for them and he'd do this whole thing over and over.

It was a visit to Senegal that made us realize how fortunate we were and how our African heritage had helped to make us what we were. We visited an old, abandoned slave camp at Gore Island and we were so moved. The African people had given us gifts of courage and endurance that we couldn't hope to repay.

— Moonwalk, 1988

Mustapha Fall, National Delegate of Tourism, honored Joe Jackson with the badge of "the Knight of the Order of Merit". The group gave thanks to him by offering the gold record for "Get It Together" to hand over to the president Léopold Sédar Senghor.

The group was supposed to meet Emperor Haile Selassie at the Emperor's Palace in Addis Ababa on February 14.

==== South America ====
The brothers and their team arrived in São Paulo on September 12 at 1 p.m. The afternoon started with a press conference at the Othon Palace Hotel, where the group stayed. Following two concerts on September 13 and 14, a television performance was taped, with the only remaining footage being of "Never Can Say Goodbye" and "Ben" due to the rest of the tape being destroyed during the Tupi studio fire in 1978.

At the time, Brazil was still under military dictatorship. Therefore, all concerts had to finish strictly before 10 p.m.

In Rio de Janeiro, the Jackson 5 gave an interview with Radio Globo, as well as a press conference at the Hotel Nacional Rio.

The concert in Brasília was originally scheduled to take place on September 21, but the equipment did not arrive in time. Following the announcement of the show's cancellation, the infuriated public caused chaos, with angry fans breaking the Jackson 5 tour bus windows. The concert eventually took place the next evening, on September 22.

The group arrived in Panama City on October 10 at 5 p.m., the same day they gave a press conference at Salon El Tonel with their official sponsor, the beer brand Super Malta. The conference was attended not only by the press but also by governmental authorities. On October 12, the group appeared at Gran Morrison Mall for an autograph signing session.

The group also visited the Guna tribe.

The Jackson 5 were scheduled to be the first performers at the Market Square Arena in Indianapolis on the venue's opening day. However, due to their South American commitments, the concert was rescheduled to October 25. Instead, Glen Campbell performed the first concert at the venue.

==== Far East ====
Joe Jackson remembers: "After the second Australian tour we have begun to work on a new album and preparation for the following concerts. The Jackson 5 had to perform in Manila. I always wanted to see the Philippines, therefore simply could not wait, when we will finally go there. The moment was suitable because our albums were on sale there so well, that Motown did not have enough time to deliver them... We gave a few radio interviews, then we were invited to reception where we were personally welcomed by Imelda Marcos, the first lady of Philippines. Our trip to Philippines was a part of tour across the Far East. During the tour we in the second time have visited Japan and Hong Kong. In November 1974 the tours have ended, and all of us finally could take a vacation." In the Philippines, the brothers performed at the Araneta Coliseum in October 1974. Planned concerts in Japan spanning across three venues in Tokyo from October 24 to 28 were cancelled for unknown reasons. US dates were performed around this time.

=== 1975 ===
==== North America ====
Most of the tour schedule consisted of nightclub shows continuing and expanding their Las Vegas Revue to other states. In February 1975, the group broke a record at the New York Radio City Music Hall Grossing $437,832 for a Serie of 8 concerts in 6 days.During the July 6 concert at the Westbury Music Fair in Westbury, New York, Jermaine left the group after the first show backstage in refusal to sign a contract with Epic Records, which his brothers signed due to the lack of creative freedom back at Motown. Marlon would replace Jermaine from this point on during the tour. On September 1, the tour would kick off with a brand new setlist, featuring material from the Moving Violation and Forever, Michael albums, as well as a local orchestra depending on their location. Prior to that, the orchestra was exclusive to Las Vegas revue nightclub/theater engagements.

==== West Indies ====
Promoter Tony Cobb organized the visit of the Jackson 5 in Jamaica and invited Prime Minister Michael Manley and his spouse Beverly to visit the concert in Kingston. Before the performance, Bob Marley invited the Jackson family to his house. They were also invited by Edward Seaga, leader of the Jamaica Labour Party. The Jackson 5 played basketball against Kingston College students and spent time at the Tivoli Gardens. Due to the show starting later than expected, Jamaican comedian Ranny Williams was brought out to attract the fans. The show started late and ended at 4 a.m., following a performance by Bob Marley and the Wailers.

=== Incomplete/shorter shows ===
Osaka (April 30, 1973) – Most songs from the setlist (including "Hallelujah Day", "Live It Up", "With a Child's Heart", and "Walk On") were not performed, presumably due to time constraints. "Superstition" was supposed to have been performed as a duet between Michael and Randy; however, Randy didn't participate in this performance.

Inglewood (August 26, 1973) – Only 14 (including the medley) out of the usual 17–18 songs were performed.

Detroit (July 24, 1974) – According to a spectator, towards the end of the concert, the audience rushed towards the stage, causing the performers to drop their instruments and leave the venue.

St. Paul (August 16, 1974) – The concert ended earlier due to chaotic crowd, with the setlist being shortened.

Indianapolis (October 25, 1974) – The concert ended 20 minutes early for unknown reasons. In response, angry fans demanded their money back from the box office.

== Set lists ==
1973

Set list A (March 2 – September 2)

1. "We're Gonna Have a Good Time"
2. "Hallelujah Day"
3. "Lookin' Through the Windows"
4. "Ain't That Peculiar"
5. "Got to Be There"
6. Medley: "I Want You Back" / "ABC" / "The Love You Save"
7. "Daddy's Home"
8. "Live It Up" or "Your in Good Hands"
9. "Superstition"
10. "Ben"
11. "With a Child's Heart"
12. "Papa Was a Rollin' Stone
13. "Skywriter"
14. "That's How Love Goes"
15. "Never Can Say Goodbye"
  Encore
16. "Walk On"
17. "I Wanna Be Where You Are

Set list B (October 19 – December 30)
The following set list may be partially out of order

1. "Get It Together"
2. "Hallelujah Day"
3. "Got to Be There"
4. "Ain't That Peculiar"
5. Medley: "I Want You Back" / "ABC" / "The Love You Save"
6. "Daddy's Home"
7. "Your in Good Hands"
8. "Superstition"
9. "Ben"
10. "It's Too Late to Change the Time"
11. "Don't Say Goodbye Again"
12. "With a Child's Heart"
13. "Papa Was a Rollin' Stone"
14. "Skywriter"
15. "That's How Love Goes"
16. "Never Can Say Goodbye"
17. "Dancing Machine"
  Encore
18. "I Wanna Be Where You Are"

Notes

- "Superstition" was often performed as a duet between Michael and Randy.
- During their concerts in Portland and Seattle, "I Found That Girl" was performed and was never performed again after, possibly due to the over-ecstatic female crowd.
- "Rockin' Robin" was occasionally performed.
- "Goin' Back to Indiana" was performed, the only known sighting currently is Baltimore, along with uncertainty of it being paired with "Brand New Thing" like previous tours.
- In Greensboro, a song from Jackie Jackson's eponymous album was performed.
- "Get It Together" was first performed and permanently replaced "Were Gonna Have a Good Time" starting August 24.
1974

February 1 – August 17
This Setlist may be partially out ouf order

1. "Hum Along and Dance"
2. "Skywriter"
3. "You Need Love Like I Do (Don't You)"
4. "It's Too Late to Change the Time"
5. "Papa Was a Rollin' Stone" (by the Temptations)
6. "Let It Be" (by the Beatles) / "Never Can Say Goodbye"
7. "Ben"
8. "I'll Be There"
9. Medley: "I Want You Back" / "ABC" / "The Love You Save"
10. "Feelin' Alright" (with instrumental excerpts of "What Is Hip?")
11. "Rockin' Robin"
12. "Superstition" (by Stevie Wonder)
13. "Daddy's Home"
14. "That's How Love Goes"
15. "Music & Me"
16. "Don't Say Goodbye Again"
  Encore
17. "Get It Together"
18. "Dancing Machine"

September 13 – November 10

1. "Hum Along and Dance"
2. "Skywriter"
3. "You Need Love Like I Do (Don't You)"
4. "It's Too Late to Change the Time
5. "Papa Was a Rollin' Stone" (by the Temptations)
6. "Let It Be"/ "Never Can Say Goodbye"
7. "Ben"
8. "I'll Be There"
9. Medley: "I Want You Back" / "ABC" / "The Love You Save"
10. "Call It Stormy Monday (But Tuesday Is Just as Bad)" (by T-Bone Walker) (interlude)
11. "Rockin' Robin"
12. "Superstition" (by Stevie Wonder)
13. "Daddy's Home"
14. "Music and Me"
15. "The Life of the Party"
  Encore
16. "Get It Together"
17. "Dancing Machine"

Notes

- "You Need Love Like I Do (Don't You)" starts from verse 2, line 7.
1975

January–June
Note
The following set list is incomplete and out of order.

1. "Hum Along and Dance"
2. "Skywriter"
3. "It's Too Late to Change the Time"
4. "Let It Be" / "Never Can Say Goodbye"
5. "Papa Was a Rollin' Stone" (by the Temptations)
6. "Happy"
7. "I Am Love"
8. "Rockin' Robin"
9. "Whatever You Got, I Want"
10. Medley: "I Want You Back" / "ABC" / "The Love You Save"
11. "I'll Be There"
12. "Ben"
13. "Daddy's Home"
14. "Call It Stormy Monday (But Tuesday Is Just as Bad)" (by T-Bone Walker)
15. "The Life of the Party"
16. "Get It Together"
17. "Dancing Machine"

September–December

1. "(You Were Made) Especially for Me"
2. "It's Too Late to Change the Time"
3. "Never Can Say Goodbye"
4. "Ben"
5. "Papa Was a Rollin' Stone" (by the Temptations) (with instrumental excerpts of "Masterpiece")
6. "Happy"
7. "I Am Love"
8. "Rockin' Robin"
9. "The Life of the Party"
10. "Forever Came Today"
11. "Music and Me"
12. "I'll Be There"
13. Medley: "I Want You Back" / "ABC" / "The Love You Save"
14. "Tito's Guitar Solo" (instrumental interlude)
15. "One Day in Your Life"
  Encore
16. "Get It Together"
17. "Dancing Machine"
1974/1975 nightclub/theater shows

The following set list does not represent every weekly appearance and is just to list a few. Each weekly appearance contains a partially different setlist. Refer to newspaper reviews for songs.

Set list as of Las Vegas, April 10–24, 1974

1. "Skywriter"
  "Musical History" (segment)
2. "Opus One" (by the Mills Brothers) / "Bei Mir Bist Du Schön" (by the Andrews Sisters) / "It's a Blue World" (by the Four Freshmen) / "Yakety Yak" (by the Coasters) / "Stop! In the Name of Love" (by the Supremes)
  Continued set
3. "Papa Was a Rollin' Stone"
4. "I Want You Back" / "ABC" / "The Love You Save"
5. "I'll Be There"
6. "Daddy's Home"
7. "Ben"
8. Medley: "Killing Me Softly with His Song" (by Lori Lieberman) / "By the Time I Get to Phoenix" (by Glen Campbell) / "Danny Boy" (by Frederic Weatherly)
9. "I Got You Babe" (by Sonny & Cher) – performed by Randy and Janet
10. "The Beat Goes On" (by Sonny & Cher) – performed by Randy and Janet
11. "Fever" (by Peggy Lee) – performed by Rebbie
12. "Sing, Sing, Sing (With a Swing)" – Tap dance routine (the Jackson Brothers and La Toya)
13. "Dancing Machine"

Other songs/acts performed

- "Down by the Old Mill Stream" (by Tell Taylor) – part of the "Musical History" segment (selected dates)
- "Rockin' Robin"
- "Get It Together"
- "Didn't We" (by Richard Harris)
- "Get Ready" (by the Temptations)
- "We're Almost There"
- "Call It Stormy Monday (But Tuesday Is Just as Bad)" (by T-Bone Walker)
- "Whatever You Got, I Want"
- "I Am Love"
- "Just a Little Bit of You"
- "Love Is Strange" (by Mickey & Sylvia) – performed by Randy and Janet
- "Indian Love Call" (by Nelson Eddy) – performed by Randy and Janet
- Act: Mae West (Janet)

== Tour dates ==
=== 1973 ===
| Date | City | Country | Venue | Opening/closing acts | No. of shows |
North America
| March 2 (Note: Originally scheduled for February 28.) | Oklahoma City | United States | Myriad Convention Center | —N/a | 1 |
| March 3 | Monroe | United States | Monroe Civic Center | Commodores | 1 |
| March 4 | Houston | United States | Astrodome | —N/a | 2 |
Japan
| April 27 (Note: Originally scheduled for April 25.) | Tokyo | Japan | Imperial Theatre | Vodka Collins | 1 |
| April 28 | Hiroshima | Japan | Hiroshima Yūbin Chokin Kaikan | —N/a | 2 |
| April 30 | Osaka | Japan | Osaka Kōsei Nenkin Kaikan | —N/a | 1 |
| May 1 | Osaka | Japan | Festival Hall | —N/a | 1 |
| May 2 | Tokyo | Japan | Nippon Budokan | | 1 |
North America
| May 5 | Portland | United States | Memorial Coliseum | —N/a | 1 |
| May 6 | Seattle | United States | Seattle Center Coliseum | Sisters Love | 1 |
| May 11 | Phoenix | United States | Arizona Veterans Memorial Coliseum | Sisters Love | 1 |
| May 12 | Salt Lake City | United States | Special Events Center | Sisters Love | 1 |
| May 13 | Sacramento | United States | Charles C. Hughes Stadium | Sisters Love | 1 |
| May 18 | Philadelphia | United States | Spectrum – Theater | —N/a | 1 |
| May 19 | Trotwood | United States | Hara Arena | —N/a | 1 |
| May 20 | Columbus | United States | National Veterans Memorial Coliseum (Note: Originally scheduled for St. John Arena) | —N/a | 2 |
Oceania
| June 23 | Brisbane | Australia | Brisbane Festival Hall | Mississippi, Hush | 1 |
| June 26 | Melbourne | Australia | Festival Hall | Mississippi, Hush | 1 |
| June 29 | Perth | Australia | Beatty Park Aquatic Centre | Mississippi, Hush | 1 |
| July 1 | Adelaide | Australia | Apollo Stadium | Mississippi, Hush | 1 |
| July 2 | Sydney | Australia | Hordern Pavilion | Mississippi, Hush | 1 |
| July 3 | Sydney | Australia | Hordern Pavilion | Mississippi, Hush | 1 |
| July 4 | Christchurch | New Zealand | Christchurch Town Hall of the Performing Arts | Marcus Hook Roll Band, Christine Hill | 2 |
| July 5 | Wellington | New Zealand | Wellington Town Hall | Trish Leef | 2 |
North America
| July 13 | Providence | United States | Providence Civic Center | Commodores | 1 |
| July 14 | New Haven | United States | Yale Bowl | Commodores | 1 |
| July 17 | San Juan | Puerto Rico | Hiram Bithorn Stadium | Commodores | 1 |
| July 20 | Pittsburgh | United States | Civic Arena | Commodores | 1 |
| July 21 | Long Pond | United States | Pocono State Fair | Commodores | 1 |
| July 22 | New York City | United States | Madison Square Garden | Commodores | 1 |
| July 24 | Chicago | United States | International Amphitheatre | Commodores | 1 |
| July 25 | Chicago | United States | International Amphitheatre | Commodores | 1 |
| July 27 | Cleveland | United States | Public Auditorium | Commodores | 1 |
| July 28 | Detroit | United States | Detroit Olympia | Commodores | 1 |
| July 29 | Saratoga Springs | United States | Saratoga Performing Arts Center | Commodores | 1 |
| August 3 | Richmond | United States | Richmond Coliseum | Commodores, Tower of Power | 1 |
| August 4 | Hampton | United States | Hampton Roads Coliseum | Commodores, Calvin Shakespeare & Son | 1 |
| August 5 | Baltimore | United States | Baltimore Civic Center | Commodores | 2 |
| August 7 | Greensboro | United States | Greensboro Coliseum | Commodores | 1 |
| August 8 | Nashville | United States | Nashville Municipal Auditorium | Commodores | 1 |
| August 10 | Columbia | United States | Carolina Coliseum | Commodores | 1 |
| August 11 | Atlanta | United States | Omni Coliseum | Commodores | 1 |
| August 12 | Miami Beach | United States | Miami Beach Convention Center | Commodores | 1 |
| August 17 | Memphis | United States | Mid-South Coliseum | Commodores | 1 |
| August 18 | St. Louis | United States | Kiel Auditorium | Commodores | 1 |
| August 19 | Indianapolis | United States | Indiana State Fairgrounds Coliseum | Commodores | 2 |
| August 21 | New Orleans | United States | Municipal Auditorium | Commodores | 1 |
| August 22 | Dallas | United States | Dallas Memorial Auditorium | Sisters Love | 1 |
| August 24 | Daly City | United States | Cow Palace | Sisters Love | 1 |
| August 25 | Fresno | United States | Selland Arena | Sisters Love | 1 |
| August 26 | Inglewood | United States | The Forum | Sisters Love, Buddy Miles Express | 1 |
| August 29 | Montreal | Canada | Autostade | Sisters Love, Commodores | 1 |
| August 31 | Columbus | United States | Ohio Expo Center Coliseum | Sisters Love, Commodores | 2 |
| September 2 | Honolulu | United States | Honolulu International Center | Sisters Love | 1 |
| October 19 | El Paso | United States | El Paso County Coliseum | —N/a | 1 |
| October 21 | San Antonio | United States | San Antonio Municipal Auditorium | —N/a | 1 |
| December 26 | College Park | United States | Cole Field House | New York City | 1 |
| December 28 | Landover | United States | Capital Centre | New York City | 1 |
| December 29 | Fayetteville | United States | Cumberland County Arena (Note: Originally scheduled for San Juan at Roberto Clemente Coliseum.) | New York City | 1 |
| December 30 | Winston-Salem | United States | Winston-Salem War Memorial Coliseum | New York City | 1 |

=== 1974 ===
NOTE *This list is incomplete*
| Date | City | Country | Venue | Opening/closing acts | No. of shows |
Africa
| February 1 | Dakar | Senegal | Stade Demba Diop | —N/a | 1 |
| February 2 | Dakar | Senegal | Théâtre National Daniel Sorano | —N/a | 1 |
| February 3 | Dakar | Senegal | Théâtre National Daniel Sorano | —N/a | 1 |
North America
| February 22 | Houston | United States | Astrodome | —N/a | 2 |
| February 23 | Denver | United States | Denver Coliseum | Al Wilson, El Chicano | 1 |
| March 8 | Greenville | United States | Greenville Memorial Auditorium | —N/a | 1 |
| March 9 | Louisville | United States | Louisville Convention Center | —N/a | 1 |
| April 10 | Las Vegas | United States | MGM Grand Hotel & Casino – Celebrity Room | Frank Gorshin | 2 |
| April 11 | Las Vegas | United States | MGM Grand Hotel & Casino – Celebrity Room | Frank Gorshin | 2 |
| April 12 | Las Vegas | United States | MGM Grand Hotel & Casino – Celebrity Room | Frank Gorshin | 2 |
| April 13 | Las Vegas | United States | MGM Grand Hotel & Casino – Celebrity Room | Frank Gorshin | 2 |
| April 14 | Las Vegas | United States | MGM Grand Hotel & Casino – Celebrity Room | Frank Gorshin | 2 |
| April 15 | Las Vegas | United States | MGM Grand Hotel & Casino – Celebrity Room | Frank Gorshin | 2 |
| April 16 | Las Vegas | United States | MGM Grand Hotel & Casino – Celebrity Room | Frank Gorshin | 2 |
| April 17 | Las Vegas | United States | MGM Grand Hotel & Casino – Celebrity Room | Frank Gorshin | 2 |
| April 18 | Las Vegas | United States | MGM Grand Hotel & Casino – Celebrity Room | Frank Gorshin | 2 |
| April 19 | Las Vegas | United States | MGM Grand Hotel & Casino – Celebrity Room | Frank Gorshin | 2 |
| April 20 | Las Vegas | United States | MGM Grand Hotel & Casino – Celebrity Room | Frank Gorshin | 2 |
| April 21 | Las Vegas | United States | MGM Grand Hotel & Casino – Celebrity Room | Frank Gorshin | 2 |
| April 22 | Las Vegas | United States | MGM Grand Hotel & Casino – Celebrity Room | Frank Gorshin | 2 |
| April 23 | Las Vegas | United States | MGM Grand Hotel & Casino – Celebrity Room | Frank Gorshin | 2 |
| April 24 | Las Vegas | United States | MGM Grand Hotel & Casino – Celebrity Room | Frank Gorshin | 2 |
| April 26 | Stateline | United States | High Sierra Theater at Sahara Tahoe Hotel & Casino | —N/a | 1 |
| April 27 | Stateline | United States | High Sierra Theater at Sahara Tahoe Hotel & Casino | —N/a | 1 |
| April 28 | Stateline | United States | High Sierra Theater at Sahara Tahoe Hotel & Casino | —N/a | 2 |
| May 13 | Washington, DC | United States | RFK Memorial Stadium | Eddie Kendricks & The Young Senators, Ohio Players, The Soul Searchers | 1 |
| May 25 | Cincinnati | United States | Cincinnati Gardens | —N/a | 1 |
| May 27 | Stateline | United States | High Sierra Theater at Sahara Tahoe Hotel & Casino | Bobby Sargent | 2 |
| May 28 | Stateline | United States | High Sierra Theater at Sahara Tahoe Hotel & Casino | Bobby Sargent | 2 |
| May 29 | Stateline | United States | High Sierra Theater at Sahara Tahoe Hotel & Casino | Bobby Sargent | 2 |
| May 30 | Stateline | United States | High Sierra Theater at Sahara Tahoe Hotel & Casino | Bobby Sargent | 2 |
| May 31 | Stateline | United States | High Sierra Theater at Sahara Tahoe Hotel & Casino | Bobby Sargent | 2 |
| June 1 | Stateline | United States | High Sierra Theater at Sahara Tahoe Hotel & Casino | Bobby Sargent | 2 |
| June 2 | Stateline | United States | High Sierra Theater at Sahara Tahoe Hotel & Casino | Bobby Sargent | 2 |
| June 22 (Note: Originally scheduled for June 16.) | Inglewood | United States | The Forum | Ohio Players, The Whispers, M-D-L-T Willis | 1 |
| June 24 | Niles | United States | Mill Run Playhouse | M-D-L-T Willis | 1 |
| June 25 | Niles | United States | Mill Run Playhouse | M-D-L-T Willis | 1 |
| June 26 | Niles | United States | Mill Run Playhouse | M-D-L-T Willis | 1 |
| June 27 | Niles | United States | Mill Run Playhouse | M-D-L-T Willis | 1 |
| June 28 | Niles | United States | Mill Run Playhouse | M-D-L-T Willis | 2 |
| June 29 | Niles | United States | Mill Run Playhouse | M-D-L-T Willis | 2 |
| June 30 | Niles | United States | Mill Run Playhouse | M-D-L-T Willis | 1 |
| July 8 | San Carlos | United States | Circle Star Theater | Import, Export, M-D-L-T Willis | 2 |
| July 9 | San Carlos | United States | Circle Star Theater | Import, Export, M-D-L-T Willis | 1 |
| July 10 | San Carlos | United States | Circle Star Theater | Import, Export, M-D-L-T Willis | 1 |
| July 11 | San Carlos | United States | Circle Star Theater | Import, Export, M-D-L-T Willis | 1 |
| July 12 | San Carlos | United States | Circle Star Theater | Import, Export, M-D-L-T Willis | 2 |
| July 13 | San Carlos | United States | Circle Star Theater | Import, Export, M-D-L-T Willis | 2 |
| July 14 | San Carlos | United States | Circle Star Theater | Import, Export, M-D-L-T Willis | 2 |
| July 19 | Pittsburgh | United States | Civic Arena (Note: Originally scheduled for Three Rivers Stadium on July 15.) | Mandrill | 1 |
| July 20 | Philadelphia | United States | Spectrum | —N/a | 1 |
| July 21 | Richmond | United States | Richmond Coliseum | M-D-L-T Willis, Tavares | 1 |
| July 24 | Detroit | United States | Detroit Olympia | Commodores | 1 |
| July 26 | Buffalo | United States | Buffalo Memorial Auditorium | —N/a | 1 |
| July 27 | New York | United States | Madison Square Garden | Ohio Players, M-D-L-T Willis | 1 |
| July 29 | Highland Heights | United States | Front Row Theater | M-D-L-T Willis | 2 |
| July 30 | Highland Heights | United States | Front Row Theater | M-D-L-T Willis | 1 |
| July 31 | Highland Heights | United States | Front Row Theater | M-D-L-T Willis | 1 |
| August 1 | Highland Heights | United States | Front Row Theater | M-D-L-T Willis | 1 |
| August 2 | Highland Heights | United States | Front Row Theater | M-D-L-T Willis | 2 |
| August 3 | Highland Heights | United States | Front Row Theater | M-D-L-T Willis | 2 |
| August 4 | Highland Heights | United States | Front Row Theater | M-D-L-T Willis | 1 |
| August 7 | New Orleans | United States | Municipal Auditorium | —N/a | 1 |
| August 10 | St. Louis | United States | Kiel Auditorium | Tavares, M-D-L-T Willis | 1 |
| August 11 | Kansas City | United States | Municipal Auditorium | Tavares, M-D-L-T Willis | 1 |
| August 16 | St. Paul | United States | St. Paul Civic Center | Haze, Sounds of Blackness | 1 |
| August 17 | Spokane | United States | Fairgrounds Ballpark | Peter Noone | 1 |
| August 21 | Las Vegas | United States | MGM Grand Hotel & Casino – Celebrity Room | Burns & Schreiber | 2 |
| August 22 | Las Vegas | United States | MGM Grand Hotel & Casino – Celebrity Room | Burns & Schreiber | 2 |
| August 23 | Las Vegas | United States | MGM Grand Hotel & Casino – Celebrity Room | Burns & Schreiber | 2 |
| August 24 | Las Vegas | United States | MGM Grand Hotel & Casino – Celebrity Room | Burns & Schreiber | 2 |
| August 25 | Las Vegas | United States | MGM Grand Hotel & Casino – Celebrity Room | Burns & Schreiber | 2 |
| August 26 | Las Vegas | United States | MGM Grand Hotel & Casino – Celebrity Room | Burns & Schreiber | 2 |
| August 27 | Las Vegas | United States | MGM Grand Hotel & Casino – Celebrity Room | Burns & Schreiber | 2 |
| August 28 | Las Vegas | United States | MGM Grand Hotel & Casino – Celebrity Room | Burns & Schreiber | 2 |
| August 29 | Las Vegas | United States | MGM Grand Hotel & Casino – Celebrity Room | Burns & Schreiber | 2 |
| August 30 | Las Vegas | United States | MGM Grand Hotel & Casino – Celebrity Room | Burns & Schreiber | 2 |
| August 31 | Las Vegas | United States | MGM Grand Hotel & Casino – Celebrity Room | Burns & Schreiber | 2 |
| September 1 | Las Vegas | United States | MGM Grand Hotel & Casino – Celebrity Room | Burns & Schreiber | 2 |
| September 2 | Las Vegas | United States | MGM Grand Hotel & Casino – Celebrity Room | Burns & Schreiber | 2 |
| September 3 | Las Vegas | United States | MGM Grand Hotel & Casino – Celebrity Room | Burns & Schreiber | 2 |
South America
| September 13 | São Paulo | Brazil | Pavilhão de Exposições do Anhembi | —N/a | 1 |
| September 14 | São Paulo | Brazil | Pavilhão de Exposições do Anhembi | —N/a | 1 |
| September 17 | Porto Alegre | Brazil | Ginásio Gigantinho | —N/a | 1 |
| September 18 | Belo Horizonte | Brazil | Arena Indepêndencia | —N/a | 1 |
| September 19 | Rio de Janeiro | Brazil | Ginásio do Maracanãzinho | —N/a | 1 |
| September 20 | Rio de Janeiro | Brazil | Ginásio do Maracanãzinho | —N/a | 1 |
| September 22 | Brasília | Brazil | Ginásio de Esportes Presidente Médici | —N/a | 1 |
North America
| October 4 | Stateline | United States | High Sierra Theater at Sahara Tahoe Hotel & Casino | Ray Stevens | 2 |
| October 5 | Stateline | United States | High Sierra Theater at Sahara Tahoe Hotel & Casino | Ray Stevens | 2 |
| October 6 | Stateline | United States | High Sierra Theater at Sahara Tahoe Hotel & Casino | Ray Stevens | 2 |
Central America
| October 11 | Panama City | Panama | Estadio Revolución | —N/a | 1 |
| October 12 | Panama City | Panama | Estadio Revolución | —N/a | 1 |
North America
| October 18 | Baton Rouge | United States | LSU Assembly Center | The Tymes, George McCrae | 1 |
| October 19 | Little Rock | United States | Barton Coliseum | The Tymes, George McCrae | 1 |
| October 20 | Houston | United States | Sam Houston Coliseum | The Tymes, George McCrae | 1 |
| October 25 (Note: Originally scheduled for September 15 and 25 but postponed due their South America tour.) | Indianapolis | United States | Market Square Arena | The Tymes, George McCrae | 1 |
| October 26 | Notre Dame | United States | Athletic & Convocation Center | The Tymes, George McCrae | 1 |
| October 27 | Milwaukee | United States | MECCA Arena | The Tymes, George McCrae | 1 |
| November 1 | Sacramento | United States | Sacramento Memorial Auditorium | —N/a | 1 |
| November 3 | Oakland | United States | Oakland-Alameda County Coliseum Arena | First Choice, Dynamic Superiors | 1 |
| November 9 | Philadelphia | United States | Philadelphia Civic Center | The Coalitions (Note: B.T. Express was originally scheduled to play) | 1 |
| November 10 | Springfield | United States | Springfield Civic Center | —N/a | 1 |
| November 20 | Las Vegas | United States | MGM Grand Hotel & Casino – Celebrity Room | Pat Cooper | 1 |
| November 21 | Las Vegas | United States | MGM Grand Hotel & Casino – Celebrity Room | Pat Cooper | 1 |
| November 22 | Las Vegas | United States | MGM Grand Hotel & Casino – Celebrity Room | Pat Cooper | 1 |
| November 23 | Las Vegas | United States | MGM Grand Hotel & Casino – Celebrity Room | Pat Cooper | 1 |
| November 24 | Las Vegas | United States | MGM Grand Hotel & Casino – Celebrity Room | Pat Cooper | 1 |
| November 25 | Las Vegas | United States | MGM Grand Hotel & Casino – Celebrity Room | Pat Cooper | 1 |
| November 26 | Las Vegas | United States | MGM Grand Hotel & Casino – Celebrity Room | Pat Cooper | 1 |
| November 27 | Las Vegas | United States | MGM Grand Hotel & Casino – Celebrity Room | Pat Cooper | 1 |
| November 28 | Las Vegas | United States | MGM Grand Hotel & Casino – Celebrity Room | Pat Cooper | 1 |
| November 29 | Las Vegas | United States | MGM Grand Hotel & Casino – Celebrity Room | Pat Cooper | 1 |
| November 30 | Las Vegas | United States | MGM Grand Hotel & Casino – Celebrity Room | Pat Cooper | 1 |
| December 1 | Las Vegas | United States | MGM Grand Hotel & Casino – Celebrity Room | Pat Cooper | 1 |
| December 2 | Las Vegas | United States | MGM Grand Hotel & Casino – Celebrity Room | Pat Cooper | 1 |
| December 3 | Las Vegas | United States | MGM Grand Hotel & Casino – Celebrity Room | Pat Cooper | 1 |

Unknown dates

| October 1974 | Quezon City, Philippines | Araneta Coliseum | N/A |

=== 1975 ===
NOTE *This list is incomplete*
| Date | City | Country | Venue | Opening/closing acts | No. of shows |
North America
| January 10 | Detroit | United States | Cobo Arena | —N/a | 1 |
| February 6 | New York City | United States | Radio City Music Hall | Blue Magic, The Hues Corporation | 1 |
| February 7 | New York City | United States | Radio City Music Hall | Blue Magic, The Hues Corporation | 2 |
| February 8 | New York City | United States | Radio City Music Hall | Blue Magic, The Hues Corporation | 2 |
| February 9 | New York City | United States | Radio City Music Hall | Blue Magic, The Hues Corporation | 1 |
| February 11 | New York City | United States | Radio City Music Hall | Blue Magic, The Hues Corporation | 1 |
| February 12 | New York City | United States | Radio City Music Hall | Blue Magic, The Hues Corporation | 1 |
West Indies
| March 8 | Kingston | Jamaica | National Arena | Ranny Williams, Bob Marley and the Wailers | 1 |
North America
| March 14 | Miami Beach | United States | Miami Beach Convention Center | Kool & The Gang, S.O.U.L. | 1 |
| March 15 | San Juan | Puerto Rico | Roberto Clemente Coliseum | Richie Ray & Bobby Cruz | 1 |
| March 16 | San Juan | Puerto Rico | Roberto Clemente Coliseum | Richie Ray & Bobby Cruz | 1 |
| April 9 | Las Vegas | United States | MGM Grand Hotel & Casino – Celebrity Room | Frank Gorshin | 2 |
| April 10 | Las Vegas | United States | MGM Grand Hotel & Casino – Celebrity Room | Frank Gorshin | 2 |
| April 11 | Las Vegas | United States | MGM Grand Hotel & Casino – Celebrity Room | Frank Gorshin | 2 |
| April 12 | Las Vegas | United States | MGM Grand Hotel & Casino – Celebrity Room | Frank Gorshin | 2 |
| April 13 | Las Vegas | United States | MGM Grand Hotel & Casino – Celebrity Room | Frank Gorshin | 2 |
| April 14 | Las Vegas | United States | MGM Grand Hotel & Casino – Celebrity Room | Frank Gorshin | 2 |
| April 15 | Las Vegas | United States | MGM Grand Hotel & Casino – Celebrity Room | Frank Gorshin | 2 |
| April 16 | Las Vegas | United States | MGM Grand Hotel & Casino – Celebrity Room | Frank Gorshin | 2 |
| April 17 | Las Vegas | United States | MGM Grand Hotel & Casino – Celebrity Room | Frank Gorshin | 2 |
| April 18 | Las Vegas | United States | MGM Grand Hotel & Casino – Celebrity Room | Frank Gorshin | 2 |
| April 19 | Las Vegas | United States | MGM Grand Hotel & Casino – Celebrity Room | Frank Gorshin | 2 |
| April 20 | Las Vegas | United States | MGM Grand Hotel & Casino – Celebrity Room | Frank Gorshin | 2 |
| April 21 | Las Vegas | United States | MGM Grand Hotel & Casino – Celebrity Room | Frank Gorshin | 2 |
| April 22 | Las Vegas | United States | MGM Grand Hotel & Casino – Celebrity Room | Frank Gorshin | 2 |
| May 5 | Gaithersburg | United States | Shady Grove Music Theatre | Redd Foxx | 1 |
| May 6 | Gaithersburg | United States | Shady Grove Music Theatre | Redd Foxx | 1 |
| May 7 | Gaithersburg | United States | Shady Grove Music Theatre | Redd Foxx | 1 |
| May 8 | Gaithersburg | United States | Shady Grove Music Theatre | Redd Foxx | 1 |
| May 9 | Gaithersburg | United States | Shady Grove Music Theatre | Redd Foxx | 1 |
| May 10 | Gaithersburg | United States | Shady Grove Music Theatre | Redd Foxx | 2 |
| May 11 | Gaithersburg | United States | Shady Grove Music Theatre | Redd Foxx | 2 |
| June 9 | Niles | United States | Mill Run Playhouse | Bobby Sargent | 1 |
| June 10 | Niles | United States | Mill Run Playhouse | Bobby Sargent | 1 |
| June 11 (Note: These two tour dates share a day, they were both performed.) | Chicago | United States | Chicago Stadium | —N/a | 1 |
| June 11 | Niles | United States | Mill Run Playhouse | Bobby Sargent | 1 |
| June 12 | Niles | United States | Mill Run Playhouse | Bobby Sargent | 1 |
| June 13 | Niles | United States | Mill Run Playhouse | Bobby Sargent | 2 |
| June 14 | Niles | United States | Mill Run Playhouse | Bobby Sargent | 2 |
| June 15 | Niles | United States | Mill Run Playhouse | Bobby Sargent | 1 |
| June 24 | Nanuet | United States | Nanuet Star Theatre | Bobby Sargent | 1 |
| June 25 | Nanuet | United States | Nanuet Star Theatre | Bobby Sargent | 1 |
| June 26 | Nanuet | United States | Nanuet Star Theatre | Bobby Sargent | 1 |
| June 27 | Nanuet | United States | Nanuet Star Theatre | Bobby Sargent | 1 |
| June 28 | Nanuet | United States | Nanuet Star Theatre | Bobby Sargent | 2 |
| June 29 | Nanuet | United States | Nanuet Star Theatre | Bobby Sargent | 2 |
| July 6 | Westbury | United States | Westbury Music Fair | —N/a | 2 |
| July 9 | Las Vegas | United States | MGM Grand Hotel & Casino – Celebrity Room | Bobby Sargent | 2 |
| July 10 | Las Vegas | United States | MGM Grand Hotel & Casino – Celebrity Room | Bobby Sargent | 2 |
| July 11 | Las Vegas | United States | MGM Grand Hotel & Casino – Celebrity Room | Bobby Sargent | 2 |
| July 12 | Las Vegas | United States | MGM Grand Hotel & Casino – Celebrity Room | Bobby Sargent | 2 |
| July 13 | Las Vegas | United States | MGM Grand Hotel & Casino – Celebrity Room | Bobby Sargent | 2 |
| July 14 | Las Vegas | United States | MGM Grand Hotel & Casino – Celebrity Room | Bobby Sargent | 2 |
| July 15 | Las Vegas | United States | MGM Grand Hotel & Casino – Celebrity Room | Bobby Sargent | 2 |
| July 16 | Las Vegas | United States | MGM Grand Hotel & Casino – Celebrity Room | Bobby Sargent | 2 |
| July 17 | Las Vegas | United States | MGM Grand Hotel & Casino – Celebrity Room | Bobby Sargent | 2 |
| July 18 | Las Vegas | United States | MGM Grand Hotel & Casino – Celebrity Room | Bobby Sargent | 2 |
| July 19 | Las Vegas | United States | MGM Grand Hotel & Casino – Celebrity Room | Bobby Sargent | 2 |
| July 20 | Las Vegas | United States | MGM Grand Hotel & Casino – Celebrity Room | Bobby Sargent | 2 |
| July 21 | Las Vegas | United States | MGM Grand Hotel & Casino – Celebrity Room | Bobby Sargent | 2 |
| July 22 | Las Vegas | United States | MGM Grand Hotel & Casino – Celebrity Room | Bobby Sargent | 2 |
| August 4 | San Carlos | United States | Circle Star Theater | Bobby Sargent | 1 |
| August 5 | San Carlos | United States | Circle Star Theater | Bobby Sargent | 1 |
| August 6 | San Carlos | United States | Circle Star Theater | Bobby Sargent | 1 |
| August 7 | San Carlos | United States | Circle Star Theater | Bobby Sargent | 1 |
| August 8 | San Carlos | United States | Circle Star Theater | Bobby Sargent | 1 |
| August 9 | San Carlos | United States | Circle Star Theater | Bobby Sargent | 2 |
| August 10 | San Carlos | United States | Circle Star Theater | Bobby Sargent | 2 |
| August 18 | Owings Mills | United States | Painters Mill Music Fair | The Moments | 1 |
| August 19 | Owings Mills | United States | Painters Mill Music Fair | The Moments | 1 |
| August 20 | Owings Mills | United States | Painters Mill Music Fair | The Moments | 1 |
| August 21 | Owings Mills | United States | Painters Mill Music Fair | The Moments | 1 |
| August 22 | Owings Mills | United States | Painters Mill Music Fair | The Moments | 1 |
| August 23 | Owings Mills | United States | Painters Mill Music Fair | The Moments | 2 |
| August 24 | Owings Mills | United States | Painters Mill Music Fair | The Moments | 2 |
| August 26 | Westbury | United States | Westbury Music Fair | The Main Ingredient (Note: The Doobie Brothers were originally scheduled to play, its unknown why this change was made.) | 1 |
| August 27 | Westbury | United States | Westbury Music Fair | The Main Ingredient | 1 |
| August 28 | Westbury | United States | Westbury Music Fair | The Main Ingredient | 1 |
| August 29 | Westbury | United States | Westbury Music Fair | The Main Ingredient | 2 |
| August 30 | Westbury | United States | Westbury Music Fair | The Main Ingredient | 2 |
| August 31 | Westbury | United States | Westbury Music Fair | The Main Ingredient | 1 |
| September 1 | Mount Vernon | United States | The Stadium at Memorial Field | Tavares, Pat Shannon, Spontaneous Combustion, The City Steppers | 1 |
| September 12 | Clarkston | United States | Pine Knob Music Theatre | Leon Haywood | 1 |
| September 13 | Clarkston | United States | Pine Knob Music Theatre | Leon Haywood | 1 |
| September 14 | Clarkston | United States | Pine Knob Music Theatre | Leon Haywood | 1 |
| September 19 | New Orleans | United States | Louisiana Superdome | Ohio Players | 1 |
| September 21 | Hampton | United States | Hampton Roads Coliseum | Tavares | 1 |
| September 26 | Indianapolis | United States | Market Square Arena (Note: Originally scheduled for Indiana Exposition-Convention Center.) | Tavares, Eddie Kendricks | 1 |
| September 27 | Rochester | United States | Rochester Community War Memorial | Tavares | 1 |
| October 10 | Memphis | United States | Mid-South Coliseum | Bobby Womack, Tavares, Natalie Cole | 1 |
| October 11 | Atlanta | United States | Alexander Memorial Coliseum | Tavares, Natalie Cole | 1 |
| October 12 (Note: Originally scheduled for Mobile at Mobile Municipal Auditorium.) | Huntsville | United States | Von Braun Civic Center | Tavares, Natalie Cole | 1 |
| October 16 | Saginaw | United States | Saginaw Civic Center | Tavares | 1 |
| October 17 | Syracuse | United States | Onondaga County War Memorial | Tavares, KC and the Sunshine Band (Note: In Buffalo, The Commodores were scheduled to play however, they didn't appear for unknown reasons.) | 1 |
| October 18 | Buffalo | United States | Buffalo Memorial Auditorium | Tavares, KC and the Sunshine Band | 1 |
| October 29 (Note: Originally scheduled for the week of October 22-28.) | Las Vegas | United States | MGM Grand Hotel & Casino – Celebrity Room | Pat Cooper | |
| October 30 | Las Vegas | United States | MGM Grand Hotel & Casino – Celebrity Room | Pat Cooper | |
| October 31 | Las Vegas | United States | MGM Grand Hotel & Casino – Celebrity Room | Pat Cooper | |
| November 1 | Las Vegas | United States | MGM Grand Hotel & Casino – Celebrity Room | Pat Cooper | |
| November 2 | Las Vegas | United States | MGM Grand Hotel & Casino – Celebrity Room | Pat Cooper | |
| November 3 | Las Vegas | United States | MGM Grand Hotel & Casino – Celebrity Room | Pat Cooper | |
| November 4 | Las Vegas | United States | MGM Grand Hotel & Casino – Celebrity Room | Pat Cooper | |
| November 24 | Highland Heights | United States | Front Row Theater | Bobby Sargent | 1 |
| November 25 | Highland Heights | United States | Front Row Theater | Bobby Sargent | 1 |
| November 26 | Highland Heights | United States | Front Row Theater | Bobby Sargent | 1 |
| November 27 | Highland Heights | United States | Front Row Theater | Bobby Sargent | 1 |
| November 28 | Highland Heights | United States | Front Row Theater | Bobby Sargent | 1 |
| November 29 | Highland Heights | United States | Front Row Theater | Bobby Sargent | 1 |
| November 30 | Highland Heights | United States | Front Row Theater | Bobby Sargent | 1 |

Unknown dates

| September 1975 | Inglewood, California | The Forum | The Main Ingredient |
| October 1975 | Chicago, Illinois | International Amphitheatre | Tavares |

== Cancelled dates ==
=== List of cancelled concerts, showing date, city, country, venue, and reason for cancellation ===
| Date | City | Country | Venue | Opening/closing act | No. of shows | Reason |
1973
| August 28 | Boston | United States | Suffolk Downs | Tower of Power | 1 | Low ticket sales |
1974
| March 10 | Toledo | United States | Toledo Sports Arena | N/A | 1 | N/A |
| June 14 | London | England | Empire Pool | | 1 | Fear of a repetition mass hysteria at a David Cassidy concert in London in May |
| June 15 | London | England | Empire Pool | | 1 | Fear of a repetition mass hysteria at a David Cassidy concert in London in May |
| June 16 | Manchester | England | Kings Hall | | 1 | Fear of a repetition mass hysteria at a David Cassidy concert in London in May |
| June 18 | Birmingham | England | Birmingham Hippodrome | Edwin Starr | 2 | Fear of a repetition mass hysteria at a David Cassidy concert in London in May |
| June 19 | Glasgow | Scotland | The Apollo | —N/a | 2 | Fear of a repetition mass hysteria at a David Cassidy concert in London in May |
| July 16 | Hamilton Township | United States | New Jersey State Fairgrounds | —N/a | 1 | Concerns of unruly crowd |
| August 6 | Huntsville | United States | Von Braun Civic Center | —N/a | 1 | Civic Center didn't open until the following year |
| October 11 | Anchorage | United States | West Anchorage High School Auditorium | —N/a | 1 | Due to Far East tour commitments |
| October 24 | Tokyo | Japan | Nippon Budokan | —N/a | 1 | Unknown reasons |
| October 26 | Tokyo | Japan | NHK Hall | —N/a | 1 | Unknown reasons |
| October 28 | Tokyo | Japan | Nakano Sun Plaza | —N/a | 1 | Unknown reasons |
| November 8 | Williamsburg | United States | William and Mary Hall | —N/a | The Tymes, George McCrae | 1 |
1975
| February 28 | Boston | United States | Boston Garden | —N/a | 1 | Permission of concert hosting denied |
| July 5 | Atlantic City | United States | Convention Hall | —N/a | 1 | Concerns of unruly crowd |
| August 15 | Chicago | United States | Soldier Field | —N/a | 1 | Concerns of unruly crowd |
| September 28 | Richmond | United States | Richmond Coliseum | Tavares, Dynamic Superiors | 1 | Low ticket sales |

== Personnel ==
Vocalists/dancers

- Michael Jackson – lead vocals, dancer and choreographer
- Jackie Jackson – vocals, dancer
- Marlon Jackson – vocals, dancer
- Tito Jackson – vocals, lead guitar, dancer (occasionally)
- Randy Jackson – vocals, dancer (occasionally), conga (quinto), timbales
- Jermaine Jackson – vocals, bass, dancer (occasionally) (until July 6, 1975 – 1st concert only)
- Janet Jackson – vocals, dancer (theater shows only)
- Rebbie Jackson – vocals, dancer (theater shows only)
- La Toya Jackson – vocals, dancer (theater shows only)

Musicians

- Johnny Jackson – drums
- Ronnie Rancifer – organ, keyboard
- Leroy Raison – drums
- Smith Jones Lewis – keyboards (various)
- Joe Scott – synthesizer
- Phil Upchurch – bass (1975)
- John Smith – bass (1975)

Orchestra

- Various local orchestras hired – all 1974 and 1975 theater shows; regular shows starting September 1975

Management

- Joe Jackson – tour coordinator, manager
- Danny O' Donovan – concert promoter
- Jack Nance – tour manager
- Richard Arons – tour manager
- Bob Jones – publicist

Wardrobe

- Ruthie West
- Bill Whitten
- International Costume Co.

Stage

- Bob Sansom – scenery
- Jerry Grollnek – lighting

== See also ==
- List of concert tours by the Jackson 5
