= The Jacksons (TV series) =

American variety show featuring the Jackson siblings

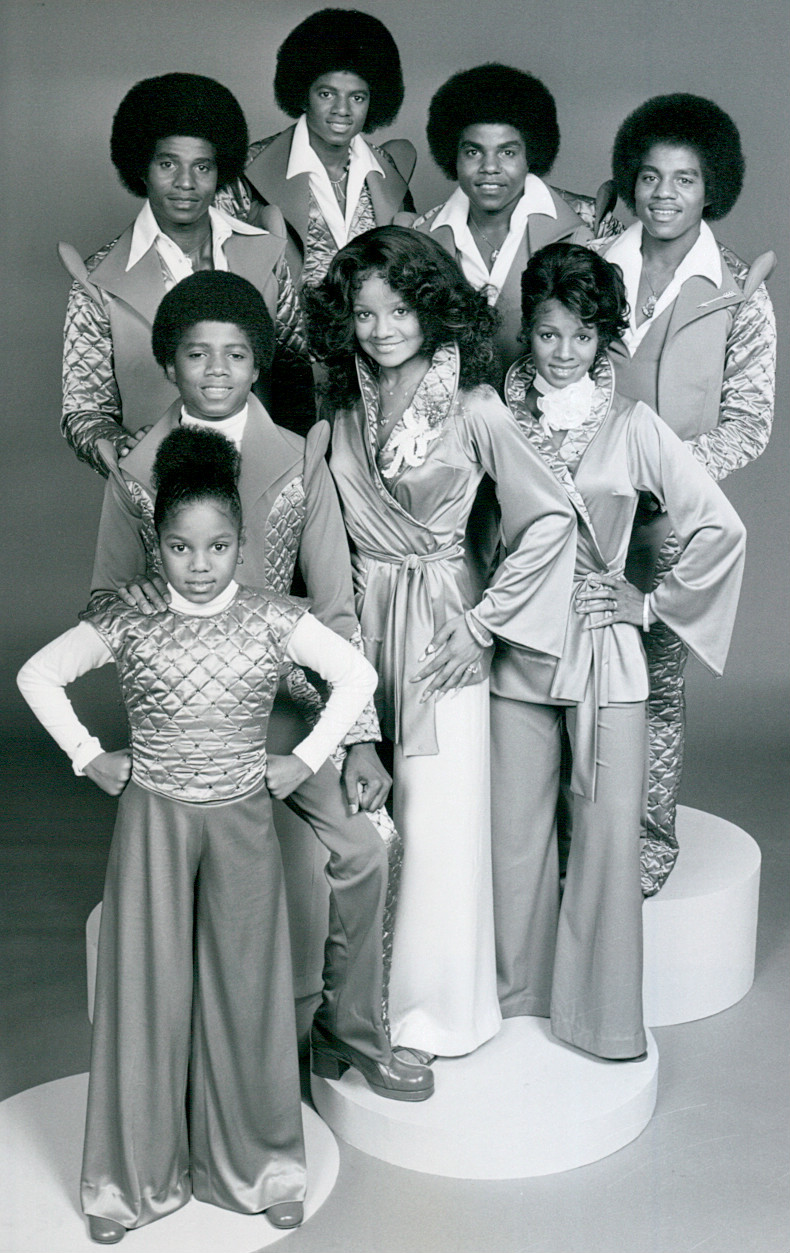
- 1977 CBS photo, top row, from left: Jackie, Michael, Tito, and Marlon Jackson. Middle row: Randy, La Toya, and Rebbie Jackson. Bottom: Janet Jackson.
- Genre: Variety
- Written by: Thomas C. Chapman; Ray Jessel; Wayne Kline; Arnie Kogen; Biff Manard; Winston Moss; Jim Mulligan; David Smilow; Jim Tisdale
- Directed by: Bill Davis
- Starring: Rebbie Jackson; Jackie Jackson; Tito Jackson; La Toya Jackson; Marlon Jackson; Michael Jackson; Randy Jackson; Janet Jackson
- Country of origin: United States
- Original language: English
- No. of seasons: 1
- No. of episodes: 12

Production
- Executive producers: Richard Arons; Bill Davis; Joe Jackson
- Producers: Ray Jessel; Arnie Kogen
- Editor: Jimmy B. Frazier
- Camera setup: Multi-camera
- Running time: 22–24 minutes
- Production companies: Carefree Video Company; Jackson Television Productions

Original release
- Network: CBS
- Release: June 16, 1976 – March 9, 1977

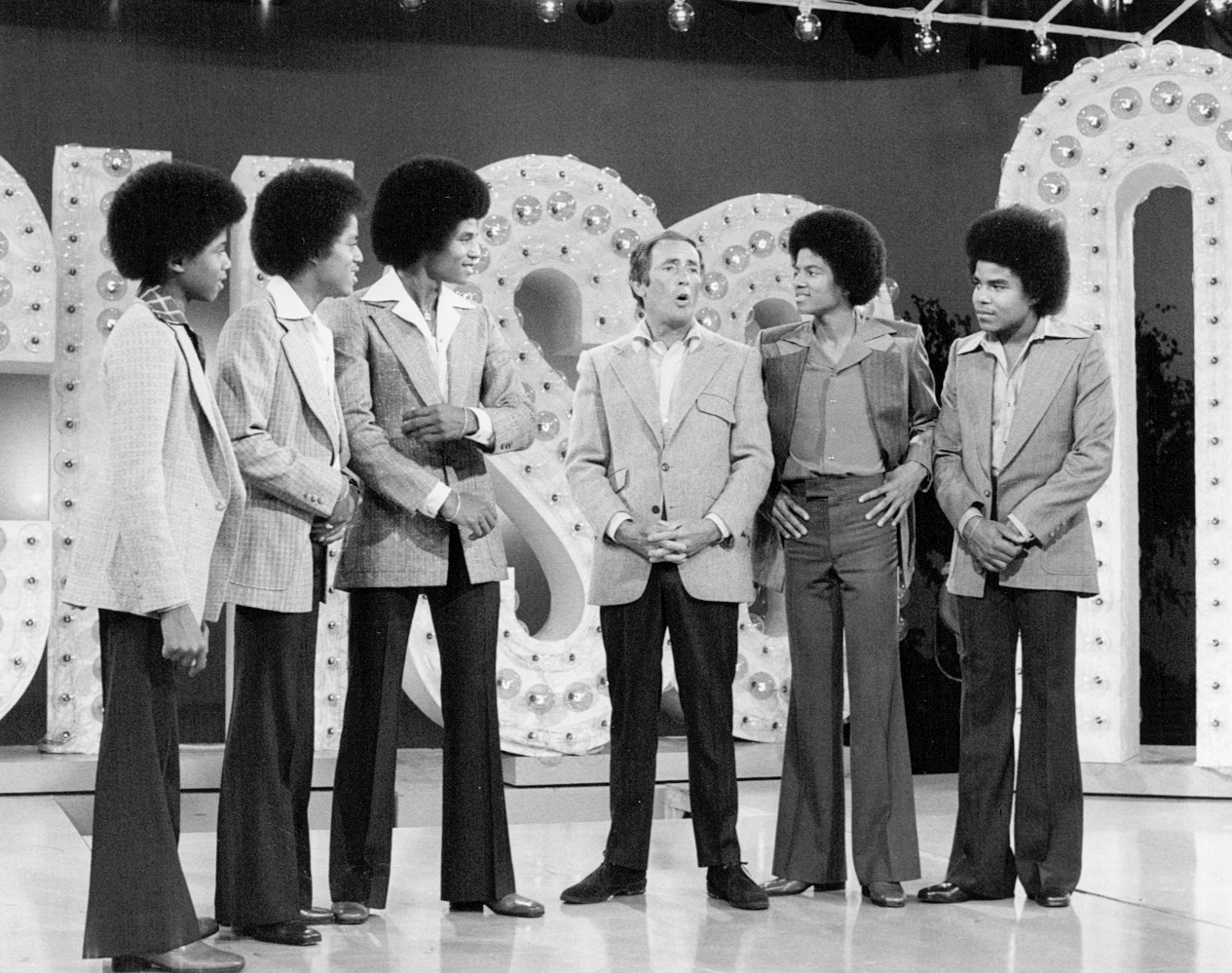
Randy, Marlon, Jackie, Joey Bishop, Michael and Tito (1976)

The Jacksons is an American variety show featuring the Jackson siblings.

== History ==
The show featured all of the Jackson siblings except for Jermaine, who was signed to Motown while the Jackson group was signed to the Epic/CBS record label. It was the first variety show where the entire cast were siblings or an African-American family. The thirty-minute Wednesday evening show began airing on CBS as a summer 1976 show and it continued into the 1976–1977 season, finishing on March 9, 1977, after running for 12 episodes.

As with the Jackson 5 regular performances, Michael Jackson was the lead performer in musical and dance performances. Despite the public acclaim following the early episodes, he was not enthusiastic with the overall project, later calling it "a dumb move" and adding he "hated every minute of it".

== Cast ==
- Rebbie Jackson
- Jackie Jackson
- Tito Jackson
- La Toya Jackson
- Marlon Jackson
- Michael Jackson
- Randy Jackson
- Janet Jackson

== Episodes ==
Broadcast date	Guest stars	Songs performed
June 16, 1976	Sonny Bono	"Forever Came Today" "Love Will Keep Us Together" "More Than You Know"/"Am I Blue?"/"For Once in My Life"/"Try a Little Tenderness" "Steppin' Out with My Baby" "Dancing Machine"
June 23, 1976	Mackenzie Phillips	"(You Were Made) Especially for Me" "Do the Fonz" "A Little Bit Country, A Little Bit Rock and Roll"/"Deep Purple" "Convoy" "Junk Food Junkie" "Ben" "Goin' Back to Indiana"
June 30, 1976	Ed McMahon	"Rockin' Robin" "Flat Foot Floogie" "World of Sunshine" "Save the Bones for Henry Jones" "The Love You Save"
July 7, 1976	Joey Bishop	"I Want You Back"/"ABC" "Fever" "I Got You Babe" "Down by the Old Mill Stream" "Never Can Say Goodbye"
January 19, 1977	Redd Foxx	"Enjoy Yourself" "They Can't Take That Away from Me"/"Broadway Rhythm"/"Puttin' on the Ritz" "Blues Away" "Bei Mir Bist Du Schön (Means You're Grand)" "Keep on Dancing"
January 26, 1977	Carroll O'Connor	"Hum Along and Dance" "Get Happy"/"I Got Rhythm" "I Got You Babe" "Coconut" "I Let a Song Go Out of My Heart"/"Don't Get Around Much Anymore"/"Caravan"/"Take the "A" Train" "Show You the Way to Go"
February 2, 1977	Dom DeLuise/ George Miller/ Muhammad Ali	"Moving Violation" "On the Wall" "That's the Way (I Like It)"/"Pick Up the Pieces" "Style of Life" "Steppin' Out with My Baby" "Hello, Dolly!" "Life of the Party"
February 9, 1977	Betty White	"Get It Together" "On the Wall" "Chattanooga Shoe Shine Boy" "Tie a Yellow Ribbon Round the Ole Oak Tree" "Dreamer" "Opus No. 1" "Just a Little Bit of You"
February 16, 1977	Georgia Engel/ David Letterman	"Sugar Daddy" "On the Wall" "Cisco Kid"/"I Shot the Sheriff" "One" "Ben" "I Am Love"
February 23, 1977	John Byner/ Nicholas Brothers	"What You Don't Know" "On the Wall" "Midnight at the Oasis" "Get Ready" "Good Times" "I Can't Quit Your Love"
March 2, 1977	Lynda Carter	"Think Happy" "On the Wall" "On the Good Ship Lollipop" "Papa Was a Rollin' Stone" "Thank God I'm a Country Boy" "Living Together" "I'll Be There"
March 9, 1977	Tim Conway/ David Letterman	"Dancing Machine" "On the Wall" "Behind Closed Doors" "Yes Sir, That's My Baby" "I'm Going to Jackson" "Flat Foot Floogie" "World of Sunshine" "Body Language"
