= I Am Love (The Jackson 5 song) =

1975 single by the Jackson 5

Single by The Jackson 5

from the album Dancing Machine
- Released: December 23, 1974
- Recorded: June 1974; Hitsville West, Los Angeles
- Genre: Funk, disco, soul, rock, pop, Progressive rock
- Length: 7:30; 5:31 (Part I); 3:01 (Part II)
- Label: Motown; M 1286
- Songwriter: D.Fenceton / J.Marcellino / M.Larson / R.Rancifer
- Producers: Mel Larson & Jerry Marcellino

The Jackson 5 singles chronology
| "Whatever You Got I Want" (1974) | "I Am Love" (1974) | "Forever Came Today" (1975) |

"I Am Love", from the album Dancing Machine, was the Jackson 5's last Top 20 hit (#15 in 1975) as the group later left Motown for CBS Records.

Released in late 1974 as a single, it was one of the group's album-oriented efforts as the song went beyond the usual playing time of a pop song, at around 7 minutes and 30 seconds. The song was part-soul ballad (led by Jermaine) and part-funk/rock dance anthem (led mostly by Michael).

On the single release, "Part 1" is an edited version of the entire album track, while "Part 2" is an edit of the faster-tempo second section. Record World said it was "clearly so powerful a production that many programmers will go with the unedited version (side one) over the tighter 'Part II' flip." After the song's success, the group released their last Motown album, Moving Violation in May 1975, before leaving the label for Epic Records (a division of CBS Records) the following month.

It charted at #3 on the US Billboard R&B chart and #15 on the Billboard Hot 100 in the US, but was not a hit in the UK Singles Chart.

Notable performances of the song were on The Cher Show in 1975, a concert in Mexico in December of 1975, and on their TV variety series in 1977.
