= Dancing Machine (The Jackson 5 album) =

Studio album by the Jackson 5
- Released: September 5, 1974
- Studio: Motown Recording Studios (Hollywood, Los Angeles)
- Genres: Progressive soul; funk; R&B; disco
- Length: 32:32
- Label: Motown
- Producers: Hal Davis; Mel Larson; Jerry Marcellino

The Jackson 5 chronology
| The Jackson 5 in Japan (1973) | Dancing Machine (1974) | Moving Violation (1975) |

Singles from Dancing Machine
- 1. "Dancing Machine" Released: February 19, 1974; 2. "Whatever You Got, I Want" Released: October 1, 1974; 3. "The Life of the Party" Released: November 29, 1974 (UK only); 4. "I Am Love" Released: December 23, 1974

Dancing Machine is the ninth studio album released by the Motown quintet the Jackson 5, on September 5, 1974. The album's title track was a No. 2 pop hit and a No. 1 R&B hit in the United States. The group released two additional singles from the album: the funky "Whatever You Got, I Want" and the group's last US Top 20 hit for Motown, "I Am Love". To date, the album has sold approximately 2.6 million copies worldwide.

== Background ==
Although the Jacksons were back on the charts, the brothers, most notably Michael, still complained about their artistic direction. Nonetheless, the album became another disco concept album for the group, and showcased lead singers Michael and Jermaine Jackson. This album was the first on which all the brothers sang in their natural voices on the same song, entitled "It All Begins and Ends with Love". The order is Tito, Jackie, Michael, Marlon and Jermaine, who closes the song. Around this time, the Jacksons were performing in Las Vegas with the rest of the family, leaving this album with low promotion. According to an interview with Don Cornelius on the R&B TV show Soul Train, Michael said that "If I Don't Love You This Way" and "What You Don't Know" were his favorite songs.

== Composition ==
The album was arranged by Arthur G. Wright, Jerry Marcellino, Mel Larson, John Bahler, James Anthony Carmichael and Sam Brown III.

== Release and reception ==
Professional ratings
Review scores
| Source | Rating |
|---|---|
| AllMusic | 4/5 stars |
| Christgau's Record Guide | B+ |
| Rolling Stone | 3/5 stars |

Record World said of the single "Whatever You Got, I Want" that "J5 put their rhythm into more blues-infused motion" and "they boogie down Soul Alley in style."

=== Re-release ===
In 2001, Motown Records remastered all Jackson 5 albums in a "Two Classic Albums/One CD" series (much like they did in the late 1980s). This album was paired with Moving Violation. The bonus tracks included the outtake "Through Thick and Thin" from the Moving Violation and Forever, Michael recording sessions and the Disc-O-Tech #3 mix of "Forever Came Today".

== Track listing ==
Side one
| No. | Title | Writer(s) | Length |
|---|---|---|---|
| 1. | "I Am Love" | Don Fenceton; Jerry Marcellino; Mel Larson; Ronnie Rancifer | 7:29 |
| 2. | "Whatever You Got, I Want" | Gene Marcellino; J. Marcellino; Larson | 2:58 |
| 3. | "She's a Rhythm Child" | Clarence Drayton; Hal Davis; Ruth Talmage | 2:39 |
| 4. | "Dancing Machine" | Donald Fletcher; Davis; Weldon Dean Parks | 2:43 |

Side two
| No. | Title | Writer(s) | Length |
|---|---|---|---|
| 1. | "The Life of the Party" | Drayton; Davis; Tamy Smith | 2:35 |
| 2. | "What You Don't Know" | G. Marcellino; J. Marcellino; Larson | 4:25 |
| 3. | "If I Don't Love You This Way" | Leon Ware; Pam Sawyer | 3:28 |
| 4. | "It All Begins and Ends with Love" | Fenceton; J. Marcellino; Larson | 3:07 |
| 5. | "The Mirrors of My Mind" | Charlotte O'Hara; Fletcher; Nita Garfield | 3:08 |

A longer version of the title track had previously been included on the group's 1973 album G.I.T.: Get It Together.

== Personnel ==
Adapted from Tidal and Lecocq & Allard.

=== Musicians ===
==== The Jackson 5 ====
- Jackie Jackson – backing vocals (track 4)
- Jermaine Jackson – lead vocals (track 4), backing vocals (track 4)
- Marlon Jackson – backing vocals (track 4)
- Michael Jackson – lead vocals (track 4), backing vocals (track 4)
- Tito Jackson – backing vocals (track 4)

==== Additional musicians ====
- Chuck Rainey – bass guitar (track 4)
- Dean Parks, David T. Walker, Arthur Wright – guitar (track 4)
- James Gadson – drums (track 4)
- Bobbye Hall – percussion (track 4)
- Joe Sample – keyboards (track 4)

=== Production ===
- Mel Larson, Jerry Marcellino – producers (tracks 1–2, 6, 8–9)
- Hal Davis – producer (tracks 3–5, 7)
- Arthur Wright – arranger (track 4)

== Charts ==
| Chart (1974) | Peak position |
|---|---|
| Canadian Albums (RPM) | 12 |
| US Billboard Top LPs & Tape | 16 |
