= Roni Griffith =

American disco musician and model

Roni Griffith is an American former 1980s disco musician and model from Bloomington, Indiana.

== Career ==
She was one of the original Coconuts in the popular 1980s group Kid Creole and the Coconuts. They opened up for the B-52's, Huey Lewis and the News and appeared on Saturday Night Live in 1981. Finding success as a musician the same year she appeared on SNL with Kid Creole and the Coconuts, Griffith decided to go solo, signing a recording contract with Vanguard Records and producer, Bobby Orlando. By the end of 1982 she had a platinum and gold record for her hits "(The Best Part of) Breakin' Up" and "Desire". "(The Best Part of) Breakin' Up" reached #63 in the UK Singles Chart in July 1984. In addition, she was also featured in the first national Clairol commercial shot in 35 mm film for Nice 'n Easy.

She lived in New York from the age of 19 until she was 23 years old, finding an amount of success within a short period of time. On the eve of her first music video and her launch on the new music media outlet MTV, Griffith decided to walk away from everything based on her morals and values as a Christian in the secular music industry.

In 1983, Griffith pursued a career as a Christian contemporary artist. She appeared on The 700 Club and was also featured numerous times in her hometown newspaper, The Herald-Times. In 2004, she released her second Christian contemporary album, entitled Only You.

After giving up her fame in the secular music industry and becoming a Christian contemporary artist, in 1994 Griffith became a professional photographer, opening up her talent production company Integrity Productions. Griffith has been working as a photographer for over 10 years. She has worked with many companies in Indiana such as the Boy Scouts of America, the Helen Wells Agency, and celebrity clients.

== Discography ==
=== Albums ===
- Roni Griffith (1982)
- Only You (2004)

=== Singles ===
- "Mondo Man" (1980) (US Dance #36)
- "Desire" (1981) (Canada #34 / Germany #17 / Switzerland #2 / US Dance #30)
- "Voodoo Man" (1982)
- "(The Best Part of) Breakin' Up" (1982) (UK #63 / US Dance #2)
- "Love Is the Drug" (1982)
- "Breaking My Heart" (1983) (Belgium #38)
- "Dancing Machine" (1984)
