= Roni Griffith (album) =

Studio album by Roni Griffith
- Released: 1982
- Genres: Electronic, hi-NRG, post-disco
- Label: Vanguard
- Producer: Bobby Orlando

Roni Griffith chronology
Roni Griffith (1982)	Only You (2004)

Roni Griffith is the debut album by hi-NRG/disco/pop music singer Roni Griffith, recorded and released in 1982 on Vanguard Records. Her first album includes backing singers, Wendell Morrison and his wife Marian Rolle and Leanora Logan, who were with the Salsoul Orchestra at that time on their last album, Heat It Up; plus Connie Harvey, who was the disco bands, Dazzle and Poussez!, and Janet Wright who was with the disco/soul band Inner Life on the Prelude Records album, I'm Caught Up (In a One Night Love Affair). It was produced by Bobby Orlando, who played all of the instruments on her album. This album features a few cuts, "Desire", "Love Is the Drug" and the cover of the Ronettes tune, "(The Best Part of) Breakin' Up". After that, she left Vanguard Records to focus more on Christian life and pursue her career as a contemporary Christian artist.

== Track listing ==
- All songs written by Bobby Orlando (Jackaroe Music/Bobby "O" Music, except track 4 Jackaroe Music/Montvale Music), except where noted.

Side one

1. "Love Is the Drug"
2. "(The Best Part of) Breakin' Up" (Peter Andreoli, Vini Poncia, Phil Spector; Mother Bertha Music/Hill & Range Sons, Inc.)
3. "That's Rock 'n' Roll" (Eric Carmen; CAM USA)
4. "Desire"

Side two

1. "Voodoo Man"
2. "Spys"
3. "Heart on the Line"
4. "Take Me Out"

== Personnel ==
- Bobby Orlando – all instruments, synthesizer, computer, producer
- Wendell Morrison, Marian Rolle, Leanora Logan – backing vocals
- Connie Harvey, Janet Wright – backing vocals on "The Best Part Of Breaking Up"
