= Ronnie Rancifer =

American songwriter

Ronnie Rancifer (born 1952) is an American keyboardist, musician and songwriter, noted for being a keyboardist for The Jackson 5 from their early Gary, Indiana, days until the end of their famed career at Motown. The label presented Rancifer and drummer Johnny Jackson as the cousins of Jackie, Tito, Jermaine, Marlon, and Michael, however neither Rancifer nor Johnny Jackson are actually related to the Jacksons.

He co-wrote "I Am Love" from the 1974 Jackson 5 album Dancing Machine. In addition to playing keys for the Jackson 5, Rancifer worked as a songwriter on some of their albums and was with the group until 1975. Rancifer had a long career as a songwriter in Los Angeles.

During the 1980s he worked with other Motown artists, and toured with Smokey Robinson.
