= Dancing Machine =

1974 single by the Jackson 5

Single by the Jackson 5

from the album Get It Together and Dancing Machine
- B-side: "It's Too Late to Change the Time"
- Released: February 19, 1974
- Studio: Hitsville West, Los Angeles
- Genre: Disco; funk
- Length: 3:30 (Get It Together version); 2:43 (Dancing Machine version)
- Label: Motown
- Songwriters: Hal Davis; Don Fletcher; Dean Parks
- Producer: Hal Davis

The Jackson 5 singles chronology
"Get It Together" (1973)	"Dancing Machine" (1974)	"Whatever You Got I Want" (1974)

"Dancing Machine" is a song recorded by American R&B group the Jackson 5; it was the title track of their ninth studio album. The song was originally recorded for the group's 1973 album G.I.T.: Get It Together and was released as a remix.

== Background ==
The song, which reportedly sold over three million copies, popularized the physically complicated robot dance technique, devised by Charles Washington in the late 1960s. Michael Jackson first performed the dance on television while singing "Dancing Machine" with the Jackson 5 on a Bob Hope special that aired September 26, 1973, but the cameraman cut away from Michael as he did the dance. A month later, on an episode of Soul Train on October 27, 1973 Michael again did the Robot dance and this time it was fully caught on camera. It was the group's first US top ten hit since 1971's "Sugar Daddy". "Dancing Machine" brought the Jackson 5 their second Grammy Award nomination in 1975 for Best R&B Performance by a Duo or Group with Vocals, losing to Rufus and Chaka Khan's "Tell Me Something Good".

== Personnel ==
- Lead vocals by Michael Jackson and Jermaine Jackson
- Background vocals by Michael Jackson, Jermaine Jackson, Tito Jackson, Jackie Jackson and Marlon Jackson
- Instrumentation by Los Angeles area session musicians:
  - Bass by Chuck Rainey
  - Guitars by Dean Parks, David T. Walker and Arthur Wright
  - Drums by James Gadson
  - Percussion by Bobbye Hall
  - Keyboards by Joe Sample
- Produced by Hal Davis
- Arranged by Arthur Wright

== Charts ==
In Canada, "Dancing Machine" went to No. 2 on the RPM 100. In the United States, it hit No. 1 on Cash Box and reached No. 2 on the Billboard Hot 100, behind "The Streak" by Ray Stevens. In addition, it hit No. 1 on the R&B charts. Billboard ranked it as the No. 5 song for 1974.

Chart (1974)	Peak position
Canada RPM	2
US Billboard Hot 100	2
US Billboard Hot Soul Singles	1

=== All-time charts ===
Chart (1958–2018)	Position
US Billboard Hot 100	374

== Samples and cover versions ==
"Dancing Machine" was most notably sampled by MC Hammer, on his 1990 album Please Hammer Don't Hurt 'Em, for "Dancin' Machine". It was also sampled again in 1990 by Vanilla Ice on the album To the Extreme, later by Too $hort (featuring Bun B) on the song "Shout It Out" and by Q-Tip on the 2008 album The Renaissance for "Move". Yung Wun sampled it for "Tear It Up" on his album The Dirtiest Thirstiest, in which the sample was uncredited and is taken directly from the film Drumline, when the marching band performed it in medley.

Additionally, the song was covered by Roni Griffith in 1984. Another alternate remix version was released on The Original Soul of Michael Jackson in 1987. It was remixed with extra vocals and many overdubbed instruments, giving it an 80's pop feel rather than a mid 70's disco feel. Paula Abdul covered the song in 1997 as an unreleased demo. It was also covered by Suburban Legends on their Japan-only EP, Dance Like Nobody's Watching: Tokyo Nights. A longer alternate version (4:25) appears on the I Want You Back! Unreleased Masters compilation released in 2009. A remix by Polow da Don was featured in a commercial for Svedka. This version was later released on the 2009 album The Remix Suite, along with three other versions of the song, by Dave Audé, Paul Oakenfold and Steve Aoki. In D-TV, it was set to the Dance of the Hours segment from Fantasia. Justin Timberlake interpolated part of the song (watch her get down, watch her get down) for the song "Murder" on his 2013 album The 20/20 Experience – 2 of 2. The song was reworked and covered by English singer Laura Mvula in 2017, with the song produced by Naughty Boy.
