= Get It Together (The Jackson 5 song) =

- Belgium 7" single

Single by The Jackson 5

from the album Get It Together
- B-side: "Touch"
- Released: August 3, 1973
- Recorded: May 1973
- Genre: R&B; soul; funk
- Length: 2:48
- Label: Motown
- Songwriters: Hal Davis; Don Fletcher; Berry Gordy; Mel Larson; Jerry Marcellino
- Producer: Hal Davis

The Jackson 5 singles chronology
"Skywriter" (1973)	"Get It Together" (1973)	"Dancing Machine" (1974)

"Get It Together" is a song written by Hal Davis, Don Fletcher, Berry Gordy, Mel Larson and Jerry Marcellino. Sung by The Jackson 5 in 1973, it is the title track from their album, Get It Together.

Record World called it a "pulsating rhythm number that features a superb Hal Davis production."

== Personnel ==
- Lead vocals — Michael Jackson and Jermaine Jackson
- Background vocals — Michael Jackson, Jermaine Jackson, Tito Jackson, Jackie Jackson and Marlon Jackson
- Instrumentation by assorted Los Angeles musicians

== Charts ==
"Get It Together" peaked at No. 28 on the Billboard Hot 100.

Chart (1973)	Peak position
US Billboard Hot 100	28
US Billboard Hot Soul Singles	2

== Television appearances ==
The group made several appearances to promote their new sound. They appeared on The Bob Hope Special (September 26, 1973), Soul Train (November 3, 1973), the TV special One More Time (January 10, 1974), and on their own variety show The Jacksons (1977).
