= Johnny Jackson (musician) =

American drummer

- Born: Johnny Porter Jackson; March 3, 1951; Gary, Indiana, U.S.
- Died: March 1, 2006 (aged 54) Gary, Indiana, U.S.
- Genres: R&B, pop, rock, dance
- Instrument: Drums
- Labels: Steeltown; Motown

Johnny Porter Jackson (March 3, 1951 – March 1, 2006) was an American drummer, noted for being the drummer for the Jackson 5 from their early Gary, Indiana days until the end of their famed career at Motown.

== Career ==
The label promoted Jackson and keyboardist Ronnie Rancifer as the cousins of the Jackson Five, however neither Ronnie Rancifer nor Johnny Jackson are actually related to the Jacksons.

On March 1, 2006, Jackson died at a home in Gary, Indiana, after being stabbed by his girlfriend, Yolanda Davis, following a quarrel. He was 54 years old. Davis later pleaded guilty to involuntary manslaughter and was sentenced to two years in prison.
