= Enjoy Yourself (The Jacksons song) =

Single by the Jacksons

from the album The Jacksons
- B-side: "Style of Life"
- Released: October 22, 1976
- Recorded: 1976
- Studio: Sigma Sound, Philadelphia, Pennsylvania
- Genre: Philadelphia soul; funk
- Length: 3:25 (album version); 3:40 (alternate version); 5:50 (12" extended version)
- Label: Epic; PIR
- Songwriter: Gamble and Huff
- Producer: Gamble and Huff

The Jacksons singles chronology
"All I Do Is Think of You" (1975)	"Enjoy Yourself" (1976)	"Show You the Way to Go" (1977)

Alternative release(s)
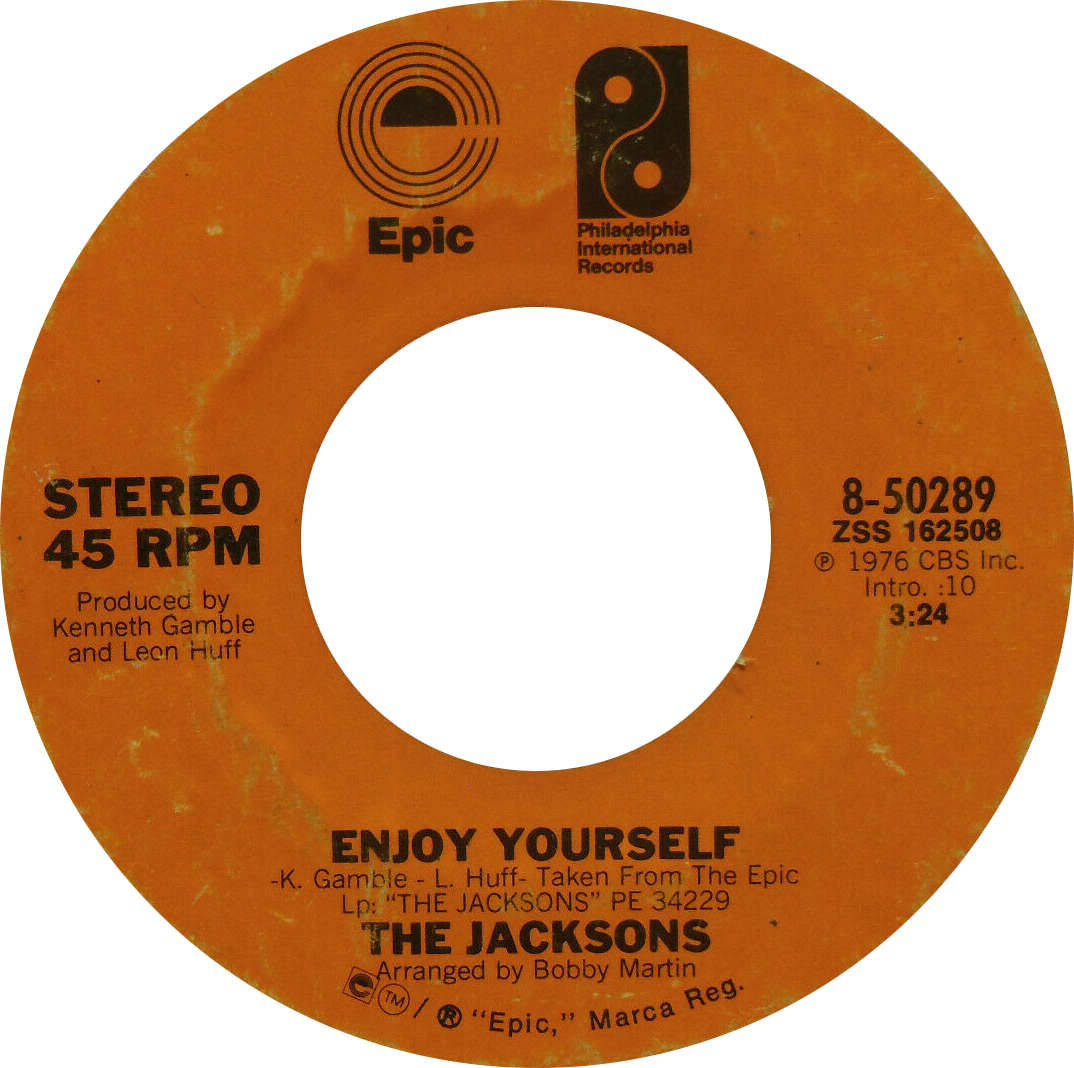
- Side A of US single

Music video
- "Enjoy Yourself" on YouTube

"Enjoy Yourself" is a song recorded by the Jacksons and released as a single in 1976. Featuring Michael and Jackie Jackson on lead vocals, it was the first single for the group since they departed from Motown earlier that year. The song peaked at number 6 on the US Billboard Hot 100 songs chart on February 19, 1977. On other US charts, "Enjoy Yourself" peaked at number 2 on the Hot Soul Singles chart and number 33 on the National Disco Action Top 40 chart. On February 14, 1989, it became the group's second single to be certified Platinum by the Recording Industry Association of America (RIAA) in the United States. It was the group's first song to officially feature new member Randy Jackson, who replaced Jermaine Jackson when he decided to stay at Motown after his brothers left.

A music video, the Jacksons' first, was released in early 1977 to promote the single; it features the five Jackson brothers wearing white suits and dancing on a stage. It was released on DVD for the bonus disc of Michael Jackson's Vision. The song was included on two of Michael's compilations, 2004's The Ultimate Collection and the US edition of The Essential Michael Jackson from 2005.

== Background ==
The song is credited to Philadelphia songwriters/producers Gamble and Huff; however, a session musician from Gamble and Huff's in-house band recalled that T.J. Tindall wrote the riff that was the initial spark for the song.

Record World said that "it's down right funky and tasteful enough to go all the way."

== Charts ==
Chart (1976–1977)	Peak position
Canada Top Singles (RPM)	5
U.S. Billboard Hot 100	6
U.S. Billboard Hot Soul Singles	2
U.S. Billboard National Disco Action Top 40	33

== Certifications ==
Region	Certification	Certified units/sales
United States (RIAA)	Platinum	1,000,000^{^}
^{^} Shipments figures based on certification alone.
