= Moving Violation =

Studio album by the Jackson 5
- Released: May 15, 1975
- Recorded: October 1974 – March 1975
- Studio: Motown Recording Studios (Hollywood, Los Angeles)
- Genre: Soul; disco; funk
- Length: 35:45
- Label: Motown
- Producer: Michael Lovesmith; Hal Davis; Brian Holland; Mel Larsen; Jerry Marcellino

The Jackson 5 chronology
Dancing Machine (1974)	Moving Violation (1975)	Anthology (1976)

Singles from Moving Violation
- 1. "Forever Came Today" Released: June 10, 1975; 2. "All I Do Is Think of You" Released: October 1975; 3. "Body Language (Do the Love Dance)" Released: January 24, 1976

Professional ratings
Review scores
Source	Rating
AllMusic	2.5/5 stars
Rolling Stone	3/5 stars

Moving Violation is the tenth studio album by the Jackson 5, and their final studio album on Motown Records, released on May 15, 1975. Aiming at the developing disco market, the group's funk-based version of Diana Ross & the Supremes' 1968 single "Forever Came Today" was a club hit, while the single's B-side, the R&B ballad "All I Do Is Think of You", became a popular and frequently covered song in its own right. Moving Violation has sold 1.6 million copies worldwide.

The album was arranged by Michael Lovesmith, Arthur G. Wright, Dave Blumberg and James Anthony Carmichael, with Lovesmith and John Bahler being responsible for the vocal arrangements. John Kosh was the album cover's designer with photography credited to Jim Britt.

== Departure from Motown ==
After the release of Moving Violation, the brothers left Motown due to the label refusing to let them write their own music and the group earning little album royalties. The only brother to stay with the label was Jermaine, due to the fact that he felt Motown was more capable of promoting Black music than Epic Records was. He was also married to Motown CEO Berry Gordy's daughter Hazel at the time. Jermaine would eventually reunite with his brothers for the Motown 25 television special in 1983, and their 1984 album Victory.

The Jackson 5 left Motown after their contract ended in early 1976, but the group had to change their name, since the Jackson 5 moniker was owned by Motown. The brothers later signed with Philadelphia International Records and Epic Records with youngest Jackson brother Randy under their new name, the Jacksons.

== Track listing ==
Side one

1. "Forever Came Today" (originally performed by the Supremes) (Holland-Dozier-Holland) – 6:23
2. "Moving Violation" (Liz Shaw, Harold Beatty) – 3:37
3. "(You Were Made) Especially for Me" (Michael Lovesmith, Brian Holland) – 3:28
4. "Honey Love" (Michael Lovesmith, Edward Holland, Brian Holland) – 4:40

Side two

1. "Body Language (Do the Love Dance)" (Hal Davis, Donald Fletcher) – 4:07
2. "All I Do Is Think of You" (Michael Lovesmith, Brian Holland) – 3:17
3. "Breezy" (Mel Larson, Jerry Marcellino) – 3:38
4. "Call of the Wild" (Mel Larson, Jerry Marcellino) – 2:33
5. "Time Explosion" (Mel Larson, Jerry Marcellino) – 4:13

== Re-release ==
In 2001, Motown Records remastered all Jackson 5 albums in a "Two Classic Albums/One CD" series (much like they did in the late 1980s). This album was paired with Dancing Machine. The bonus tracks included the outtake "Through Thick and Thin" from the Moving Violation and Forever, Michael recording sessions and the Disc-O-Tech #3 mix of "Forever Came Today".

== Charts ==
Chart (1975)	Peak position
US Billboard Top LPs & Tape	36
