= Arthur G. Wright =

American R&B guitarist, record producer and vocalist (1937–2015)

Arthur George Wright (May 28, 1937 – July 4, 2015) was an American R&B session guitarist, arranger, record producer and vocalist, sometimes credited as Art Wright.

He learned guitar as a child in Los Angeles, and started working with bands in small clubs, as well as accompanying doo-wop vocal groups. One of his musical influences was T-Bone Walker. He formed his first band while at high school in 1953. After meeting H. B. Barnum, they formed a band, the Circats, who played in clubs in the late 1950s and also toured Hawaii with Billy Ward and the Dominoes. He also worked in bands backing such performers as Roy Milton, Sam Cooke, Don Julian, and Johnny Otis.

From the 1960s, he worked as a session guitarist in Los Angeles, and featured on Little Johnny Taylor's "Part Time Love", Diana Ross' "Love Hangover" and Thelma Houston's "Don't Leave Me This Way". Often in collaboration with producer Hal Davis, he worked with many other Motown acts over a period of more than twenty years, including: Smokey Robinson, The Supremes, The Jackson 5, Stevie Wonder, Marvin Gaye, and The Temptations, as well as other musicians including: Ray Charles, The Friends of Distinction, the Righteous Brothers, Mel Brown, Jerry Butler, Donna Summer, Ike & Tina Turner, and Billy Preston. It is estimated that he appeared as musician or arranger on over 5,000 recordings in all.

Along with David T. Walker, he was a member of the studio band Afrique, in the late 1960s. In 1978 he led his own band, The Wright Brothers Flying Machine, who released a self-titled album on Casablanca Records.

His death at the age of 78 was reported in July 2015. His funeral took place on July 18, 2015, in Lawndale, California.

== Discography ==
With Eddie "Cleanhead" Vinson

- The Original Cleanhead (BluesTime, 1970)

With the Super Black Blues Band: T-Bone Walker, Otis Spann and Joe Turner

- Super Black Blues (BluesTime, 1969)
