= The Jackson 5 =

American family pop band

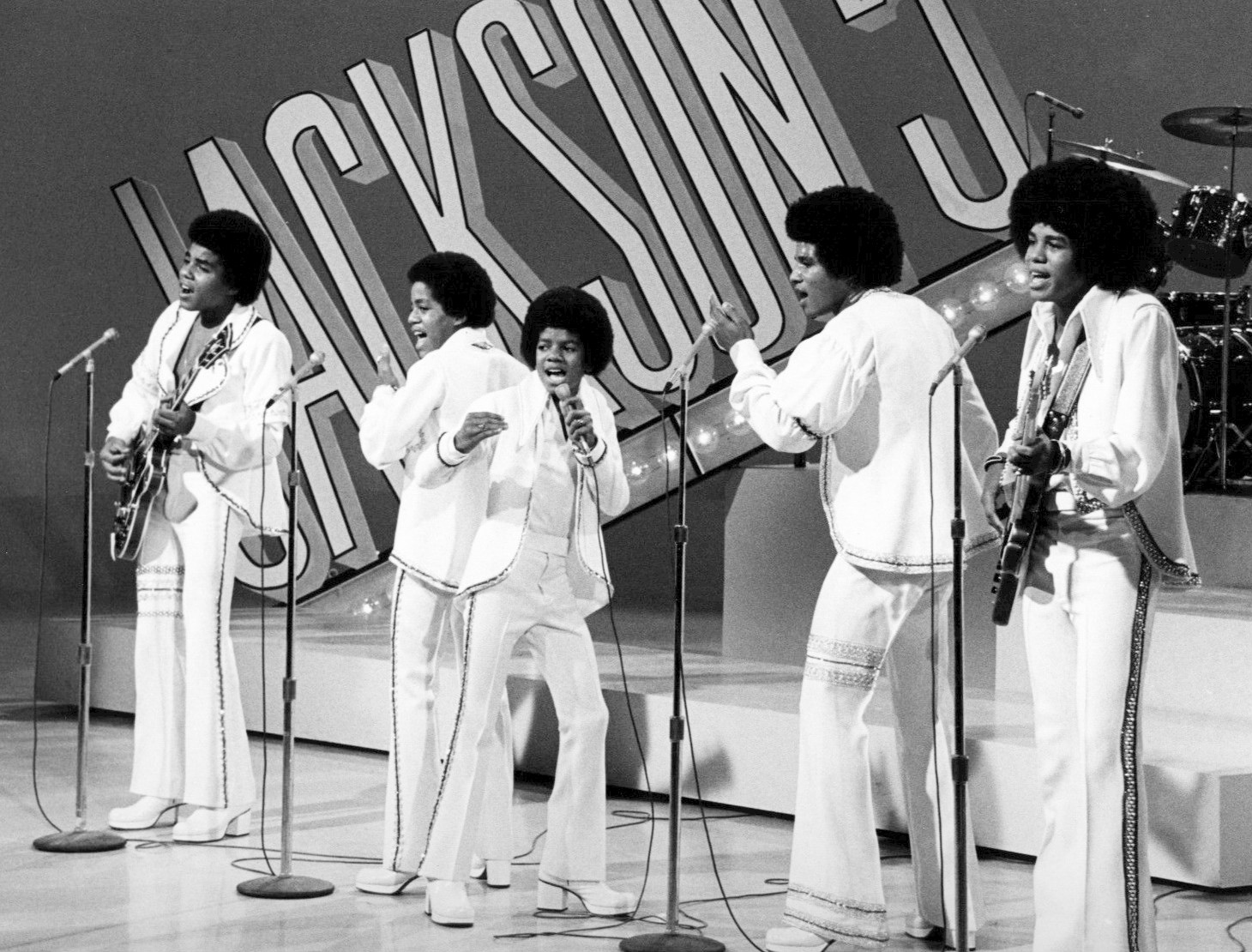
- The Jackson 5 in 1972; From left: Tito, Marlon, Michael, Jackie, Jermaine

Background information
- Also known as: The Jackson Brothers (1964–1965); The Jackson 5 (1965 - 1976); The Jacksons (1976–present)
- Origin: Gary, Indiana, U.S.
- Genres: Pop; R&B; soul; funk; disco; bubblegum
- Works: Discography
- Years active: 1964–1989; 2001; 2012–present
- Labels: Steeltown; Motown; PIR; Epic; CBS
- Members: Jackie Jackson; Marlon Jackson
- Past members: Tito Jackson; Jermaine Jackson; Michael Jackson; Randy Jackson
- Website: thejacksons.live

The Jacksons, known as The Jackson 5 (Note: or the Jackson Five, sometimes stylized as the Jackson 5ive) from 1965 until 1976, is an American pop group composed of members of the Jackson family. The group was formed in Gary, Indiana, in 1964 under the name The Jackson Brothers, and originally consisted of brothers Jackie, Tito, Jermaine, Marlon, and Michael Jackson. The brothers were managed by their father, Joe Jackson. They were among the first African American performers to attain a following across multiple genres.

The Jackson 5 first performed in talent shows and clubs on the Chitlin' Circuit and eventually signed with Steeltown Records in 1967, under which their first two singles were released. In 1968, they left Steeltown and signed with Motown, where they were the first group to debut with four consecutive number-one hits on the Billboard Hot 100 chart with the songs "I Want You Back" (1969), "ABC", "The Love You Save", and "I'll Be There" (all 1970). They achieved seventeen Top 40 singles on the chart in five years, including six number-one Billboard rhythm and blues (R&B) hits. The group left Motown for Epic Records in early 1976, with the exception of Jermaine, who was replaced by youngest brother Randy. Changing their name to the Jacksons upon signing with Epic, they released four studio albums and one live album between 1976 and 1981, including the successful albums Destiny (1978) and Triumph (1980) and singles "Enjoy Yourself" (1976), "Shake Your Body (Down to the Ground)" (1978), "This Place Hotel" (1980), and "Can You Feel It" (1981).

The brothers also embarked on solo careers, with Michael's being the most successful. In 1983, Jermaine reunited with the band to perform on the Motown 25: Yesterday, Today, Forever television special. They released the Victory album the following year, followed by an extensive tour which also featured songs from Michael's solo albums. After the Victory tour, Michael and Marlon left the group. The four remaining members released the poorly received 2300 Jackson Street album in 1989 before being dropped from Epic. In 2001, the Jacksons reunited on Michael's 30th Anniversary Celebration TV special. The four eldest of the brothers embarked on their Unity Tour in 2012 following Michael's death in 2009, and they planned several major performances for 2017.

The Jackson 5 have sold over 150 million records worldwide, making them one of the best-selling artists of all time. In 1980, the brothers were honored with a star on the Hollywood Walk of Fame as the Jacksons. They were inducted to the Rock and Roll Hall of Fame in 1997. Two of the band's recordings, "ABC" and "I Want You Back", are among the Rock and Roll Hall of Fame's 500 Songs that Shaped Rock and Roll and, alongside "I'll Be There", were also inducted into the Grammy Hall of Fame.

== History ==
=== 1964–1969: Early years ===
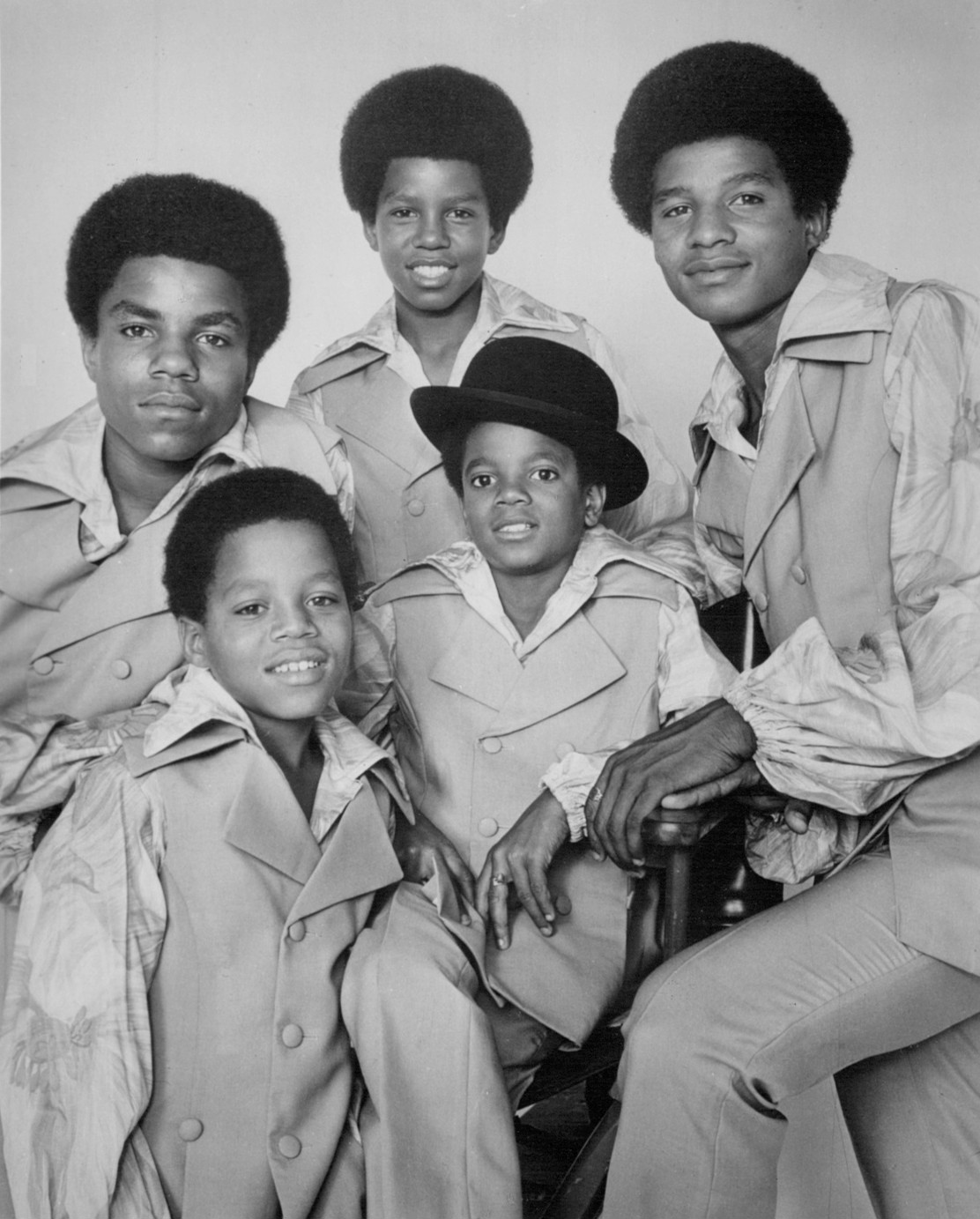
The Jackson 5 in 1969 (counterclockwise from top right): Jackie, Jermaine, Tito, Marlon, and Michael Jackson

The five Jackson brothers' interest in music was bolstered by their father, Joe Jackson, a steel-mill worker who played guitar in a local band in Gary, Indiana. Joe told the boys not to play his guitar while he was out, but Tito and others began practicing with it until one day a string broke and Joe learned that Tito was seriously interested. Joe taught the boys some of his techniques and bought Tito his own guitar, later supported by a bass for Jermaine and other equipment. The boys rehearsed extensively, and by 1964 performed with the lineup of Jackie, Tito, Jermaine, Marlon, and Michael. Joe managed their appearances at local talent shows, during which time the band was variously branded as the Jacksons, the Jackson Brothers, and the Jackson Brothers Five. Marlon played bongo drums, and the unrelated Johnny Jackson and Ronnie Rancifer played the drum kit and organ, respectively. In 1965, a local talent producer who was organizing a poster for an event suggested the simpler name of the Jackson Five.

In 1966, the group won their first talent show at Theodore Roosevelt High School in Gary. Jermaine performed the Temptations' "My Girl", and Michael performed Robert Parker's "Barefootin'". During their early performing years, the Jackson 5 would perform at other talent showcases at several other schools, halls, and theaters in Gary and places like Boston, Chicago, Detroit, Phoenix, and New York City, including the Regal Theater in Chicago and the Apollo Theater in Harlem. During this time, the band (particularly Michael) studied performances by artists such as James Brown, Jackie Wilson, Sam & Dave, and the O'Jays. In July 1967, the group recorded an early version of "Big Boy", which would later be their first single, for One-derful Records, but the group was rejected by that label. That year, Gladys Knight sent the group's demo tape to Motown, but the label founder rejected and returned the tape.

In November 1967, Joe Jackson signed the group into Steeltown Records, a label founded and owned by record producer Gordon Keith. With Keith at the helm, they recorded "Big Boy" again that same month. The song would later be released as a single in January 1968. By March, Keith had managed to sign the Jackson 5 into a distribution deal with Atlantic Records, where "Big Boy" and another single, "We Don't Have to Be Over 21 (To Fall in Love)", were distributed. "Big Boy" eventually moved 10,000 copies. By March, Keith booked the boys to perform for their first paying gig at the Apollo Theater where they opened for Etta James. That month, Keith had "Big Boy" distributed through Atlantic and was working on a record contract for the boys on that label when he learned that Joe Jackson had tried to get in touch with Motown through his attorney Richard Arons.

During July 1968, the boys opened for Bobby Taylor & the Vancouvers at the Regal Theater. After being blown away by Michael's performance, Taylor sent the boys to Detroit where he set up a recorded Motown audition, which took place at Motown's official headquarters on Detroit's Woodward Avenue on July 23, 1968. Motown chief Berry Gordy, who had initially rejected their tape, refusing to sign any more "kid acts" after Stevie Wonder, changed his mind once he viewed Taylor's tape. On July 26, Gordy returned to Detroit where he had Joe Jackson and the boys sign their first year-long Motown contract. The recording of their first album was delayed due to a contract dispute with Keith. While negotiations were continuing to get the Jacksons out of Steeltown, the group performed at strip clubs to make extra income.

Finally on March 11, 1969, a day before Marlon's 12th birthday, the Jackson Five signed an exclusive seven-year contract with the label. After initial recordings at Detroit's Hitsville U.S.A. failed to impress Gordy, he sent the Jacksons to Hollywood. In August, Motown's PR machine, led by Suzanne de Passe, started to pass off the group as having been discovered by Supremes lead singer Diana Ross. When the group opened for record industry insiders at the Los Angeles club, the Daisy, Michael was billed as an "eight-year-old sensation", though he was several days shy of his 11th birthday. Shortly after the Daisy performance, the Jackson Five performed a cover of "It's Your Thing" at the Miss Black America Pageant in New York. By September, Gordy had set up the new songwriting and producing team, The Corporation, to write exclusively for the Jackson Five. After recording "I Want You Back" that same month, the single was released in early October and the Jacksons promoted the song on programs such as the Hollywood Palace and the Ed Sullivan Show. Their debut album, Diana Ross Presents The Jackson 5, was released in December 1969.

=== 1970–1972: Jacksonmania ===
The Jackson family represents a colossus in music history. They defined black American music as a commercial entity for longer than anyone. With an average age of 12 when they turned professional, Michael, Marlon, Jackie, Jermaine and Tito were arguably the original boy band. Thousands of fans waited for the Jackson 5 wherever they went, and they had to be escorted by the police. During the height of Jacksonmania, crowds would pile up on top of each other to get closer to the stage. Early footage shows girls climbing over seats to get closer, with police officers trying to control the situation. When the Jackson 5 performed at The Forum, in Inglewood, California in 1970, they attracted nearly 19,000 fans. Thousands of more fans were turned away due to the Forum's capacity limits. The concert grossed more than $105,000, a record at that time. The Forum concert is featured on Live at the Forum. Veteran singer Jerry Butler and the Rare Earth (one of Motown's most popular white groups) were also opening acts for them. The tours got bigger as they evolved. The Jackson 5 performed to sold-out concerts with record-breaking attendance nationally and internationally, including Africa, Asia and Europe. The excitement of Jacksonmania was worldwide. Motown established a Jackson 5 brand. By the 70s, they were one of the world's most famous groups. Jacksonmania set the tone for the music industry for years to come.

The Jackson 5 became Motown's main marketing focus and the label capitalized on the group's youth appeal, licensing dozens of products, including the J5 heart logo on Johnny Jackson's drum set, the group's album covers, stickers, posters, and coloring books, as well as a board game and a Saturday morning cartoon; Jackson 5ive produced by Rankin/Bass. The black publication Right On! began in 1971 and focused heavily on the Jackson 5, with members adorning covers between January 1972 and April 1974. The Jackson 5 was featured on the cover of Rolling Stone magazine at a time when Rolling Stone did not usually cover children acts. They also appeared on the covers of Life and Ebony. The group appeared in several television specials including Diana Ross' 1971 special, Diana!. They starred in their first of two Motown-oriented television specials Goin' Back to Indiana in September; their second was The Jackson 5 Show which debuted in November of the following year. The group often joined Bob Hope on USO-benefited performances to support military troops during the Vietnam War.

The Jackson 5 single "I Want You Back" topped the Billboard Hot 100 in January 1970. They released two more number-one singles: "ABC" and "The Love You Save". The single "I'll Be There" was co-written and produced by Hal Davis and became the band's fourth number-one single, making them the first recording act to have their first four singles reach the top of the Hot 100. All four were almost as popular in other countries as they were in the United States. The Jackson 5 released a succession of four albums in one year and replaced The Supremes as Motown's best-selling group. They continued their success with singles such as "Mama's Pearl", "Never Can Say Goodbye", and "Sugar Daddy", giving them a total of seven top-ten singles within a two-year period.

In order to continue increasing sales, Motown launched Michael Jackson's solo career in 1971 with the hit single "Got to Be There", released in October. His subsequent singles "Rockin’ Robin" and "I Wanna Be Where You Are" from his solo debut album Got to Be There were also hits. His 1972 song "Ben" became his first to top the charts. Jermaine was the second to release a solo project; his most successful hit of the period was a cover of the doo-wop song "Daddy's Home".

=== 1973–1976: Decline ===
The Jackson 5's records began falling on the charts by 1973, despite Michael and Jermaine's solo successes. The Corporation had produced most of their hit singles, but they split up in 1973. The brothers focused on the emerging disco craze and recorded the song "Get It Together", followed by their 1974 hit "Dancing Machine", their first to crack the top ten since "Sugar Daddy" nearly three years before. Despite those successes, most of the Jackson 5's follow-ups were not as successful, and Joe Jackson grew tired of Motown's uneasiness to continue producing hits for the brothers by 1973. He began producing a nightclub act around his sons and daughters, starting in Las Vegas and expanding to other states.

By 1975, the Jackson 5 had sold over 60 million records and most of the group opted out of recording any more music for Motown, desiring creative control and royalties after learning that they were earning only 2.8% of royalties from Motown. The Jacksons announced their decision to depart from Motown at a press conference at the Rainbow Grill in Manhattan, New York City. Joe Jackson then began negotiating to have the group sign a lucrative contract with another company, settling for Epic Records, which had offered a royalty rate of 20% per record; he signed with the company in June 1975. Absent from the deal was Jermaine Jackson, who decided to stay with Motown following his marriage to Hazel Gordy, and Randy Jackson replaced him. Even though the group announced their departure from the label, they still remained under contract to Motown until March 1976. Motown sued them for breach of contract but allowed the group to record for Epic, as long as they changed their name because Motown owned the name Jackson 5. The brothers thus renamed themselves the Jacksons.

=== 1976–1989: CBS/Epic Records ===
In November 1976, following the debut of the family's weekly variety series, the Jacksons released their self-titled CBS debut under the Philadelphia International subsidiary, produced by Gamble & Huff. Featuring "Enjoy Yourself" and "Show You the Way to Go", the album went gold but failed to generate the sales the brothers had enjoyed while at Motown. A follow-up, Goin' Places, fizzled. Renewing their contract with Epic, the Jacksons were allowed full creative control on their next recording, Destiny, released in December 1978. By 1979, the Jacksons had sold 90 million records. Featuring their best-selling Epic single to date, "Shake Your Body (Down to the Ground)", written by Michael and Randy, the album sold over a million copies. Its follow-up, 1980's Triumph, also sold a million copies, spawning hits such as "Lovely One", "This Place Hotel" and "Can You Feel It". On March 3, 1980, Randy was seriously injured in a car crash in Hollywood, California, suffering multiple fractures to his legs and feet, which delayed some of the group's promotional plans. In 1981, they released their fifth album, a live album that eventually sold half a million copies. The live album was culled from recordings of performances on their Triumph Tour.

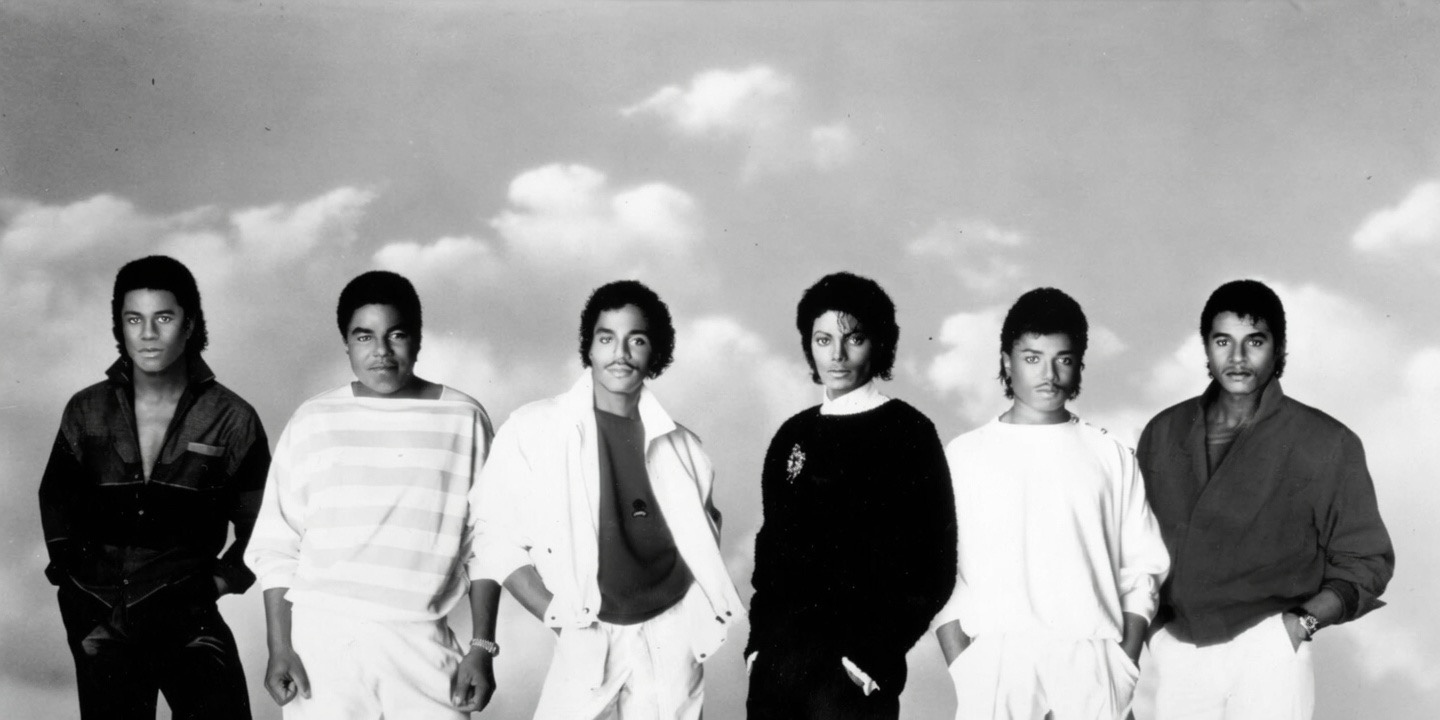
The Jacksons in 1984.

In between the releases of Destiny and Triumph, Michael released his first solo effort under Epic, Off the Wall. Its success led to rumors of Michael's alleged split from his brothers. After Triumph, Michael worked on his second Epic solo release, which was released in November 1982 as Thriller, which later went on to become the best-selling album of all time, winning eight Grammy Awards including Album of the Year, plus producing two number-one hit singles, "Billie Jean" and "Beat It", and three breakthrough MTV music videos, "Billie Jean", "Beat It", and the 14-minute zombie-themed music video "Thriller". In March 1983, with Jermaine, the Jacksons performed on Motown 25: Yesterday, Today, Forever, the same show where Michael debuted the moonwalk during a solo performance of "Billie Jean".

Following the success of the reunion, all six brothers agreed to record a sixth album for Epic, later released as Victory in 1984. Their biggest-selling album to date, it included their final top ten single, "State of Shock". The song was actually a duet between Michael and Mick Jagger and did not feature participation from any other Jackson besides Marlon and Jackie, who were credited as background vocalists. Most of the album was produced in this way, with each brother essentially recording solo songs. Another hit was the top 20 single "Torture", a duet between Michael and Jermaine, with Jackie singing several parts. In the same year, the brothers participated in filming a Pepsi commercial where Michael suffered burns to his scalp due to a pyrotechnic fault. In July 1984, the Jacksons launched their Victory Tour, which was overshadowed by Jackie's leg injury, ticket issues, friction between the brothers, and a shakeup in the promotion and marketing team, initially headed by Don King, who was later fired. Michael announced he was leaving the group after their final performance at Dodger Stadium that December to continue his solo career. The following January, Marlon Jackson also announced he was leaving the group to pursue a solo career. At the time of their breakup the Jackson 5 had sold more than 100 million records worldwide.

In 1987, the Jacksons released the single "Time Out for the Burglar", which was included on the soundtrack of the Whoopi Goldberg comedy film Burglar (1987). In 1989, the remaining quartet of Jackie, Tito, Jermaine and Randy released the album 2300 Jackson Street. After a brief promotional tour, the group went into hiatus and never recorded another album together. Following the release of one solo album, Marlon quit the music business in 1989 and invested in real estate. Randy has not been active in the industry since he disbanded the group Randy & the Gypsys in 1991.

=== 2001–2011: Reunion and death of Michael ===
"This Is It"
A sample of Michael and the Jacksons' "This Is It". The song was the first song for the Jacksons to chart on the Billboard Hot Adult Contemporary Tracks since 1970. (The song was originally recorded by Michael alone, and served as the title track for his posthumous concert film.)

In September 2001, nearly 17 years after their last performance together, all six Jackson brothers reunited for two performances at Madison Square Garden for a 30th anniversary special commemorating Michael's solo career, which aired in November. In early 2009, the four elder brothers began filming a reality show to make their attempt on reuniting the band, later debuting in December 2009 as The Jacksons: A Family Dynasty. During the middle of the project, Michael had announced his concert comeback in London was scheduled on July 13, 2009. Michael died that same year on June 25, putting efforts on hold.

Later in 2009, the surviving Jacksons recorded background vocals to add to Michael's 1980 demo of "This Is It", which became the theme song to the concert film Michael Jackson's This Is It. The radio-only single was released in October of that same year. The song returned the Jacksons to the Billboard charts, not on the Hot 100, but at number nineteen on Hot Adult Contemporary Tracks. The surviving members of the Jacksons were in talks of planning a reunion concert tour (which was to serve as a tribute to Michael) for 2010, and were in talks in working on their first new studio album in over 20 years. Neither plan was put into action. In September 2010, Jermaine Jackson held his own tribute concert to Michael in Las Vegas. In 2011, Jackie Jackson released a solo single to iTunes. Jermaine released his first solo album in 21 years, I Wish U Love.

In August 2011, there was a discord between the brothers concerning a tribute concert dedicated to Michael. While Jackie, Tito, and Marlon were present with mother Katherine and sister La Toya for a tribute concert in Cardiff at the Millennium Stadium for a press conference concerning the tour, a couple of days later, both Randy and Jermaine issued a statement denouncing the tribute tour as the date of it occurred around Conrad Murray's manslaughter trial in relation to Michael's death. The show carried on with Jackie, Tito and Marlon performing without Jermaine. In October 2011, the Jacksons were featured artists on Japanese-American singer Ai's single, "Letter in the Sky". The song was a tribute to Michael and was the group's first single in 22 years. The song served as the theme song for the Michael Jackson Tribute: Live in Tokyo concert that took place December 13 and 14, 2011 at Yoyogi National Stadium in Japan. The single was a modest hit in Japan, charting at number 14 on the Japan Oricon Singles Chart and number 36 on the Billboard Japan Hot 100.

=== 2012–present: Continued activities ===
In April 2012, Jackie, Tito, Jermaine, and Marlon announced that they would reunite for several United States concerts for their Unity Tour. 38 dates were announced; the eleven shows in the U.S. were canceled. The tour started at Casino Rama in Orillia, Ontario, Canada on June 20, 2012. 32 additional dates were eventually added, and the tour ended on July 27, 2013, in Atlantic City, United States.

On January 7, 2016, the Jacksons performed at Planet Hollywood Las Vegas, at a concert event, naming it "Heal the World: A Tribute to Michael Jackson". A big-name roster of music stars performed the music of Michael Jackson at the concert.

On June 15, 2018, the four Jacksons; Tito, Jackie, Marlon and Jermaine accepted plaques bearing the Detroit city keys during a high-ticket private party that launched the second Detroit Music Weekend festival. Detroit police chief James Craig, who presented the honors, declared the Motown group "truly Detroiters". The Jacksons headlined and performed at Detroit Music Weekend Festival on the 16th. They were also honored with a 90-minute tribute concert featuring Jackson 5, the Jacksons, Michael Jackson, Janet Jackson and Rebbie Jackson hits, with guest appearances by Blue Note saxophonist David McMurray and Herschel Boone for Kid Rock's Twisted Brown Trucker Band. The concert finale was Michael Jackson's "Don't Stop 'Til You Get Enough" with Greg Phillinganes, a Detroit native who worked with the Jacksons as a session player and tour musical director.

In January 2020, the Jacksons visited Chicago, Illinois, and Gary, Indiana, for the groundbreaking of a new Hard Rock Casino in Gary which played repository to Jacksons memorabilia while bringing 2,000 jobs. They were interviewed by the Chicago Sun-Times and Windy City Live. They also visited their old school in Gary where they donated their appearance fee to provide 170 bicycles to the Boys & Girls Clubs of America youth. They also got $61,000 donated to the club by Walmart, Hard Rock and Spectacle whose plan is to have a Jackson family museum and restaurant at the casino.

On September 15, 2024, Tito suffered a fatal heart attack at the age of 70 while he was on a road trip in Gallup, New Mexico.

== Legacy ==
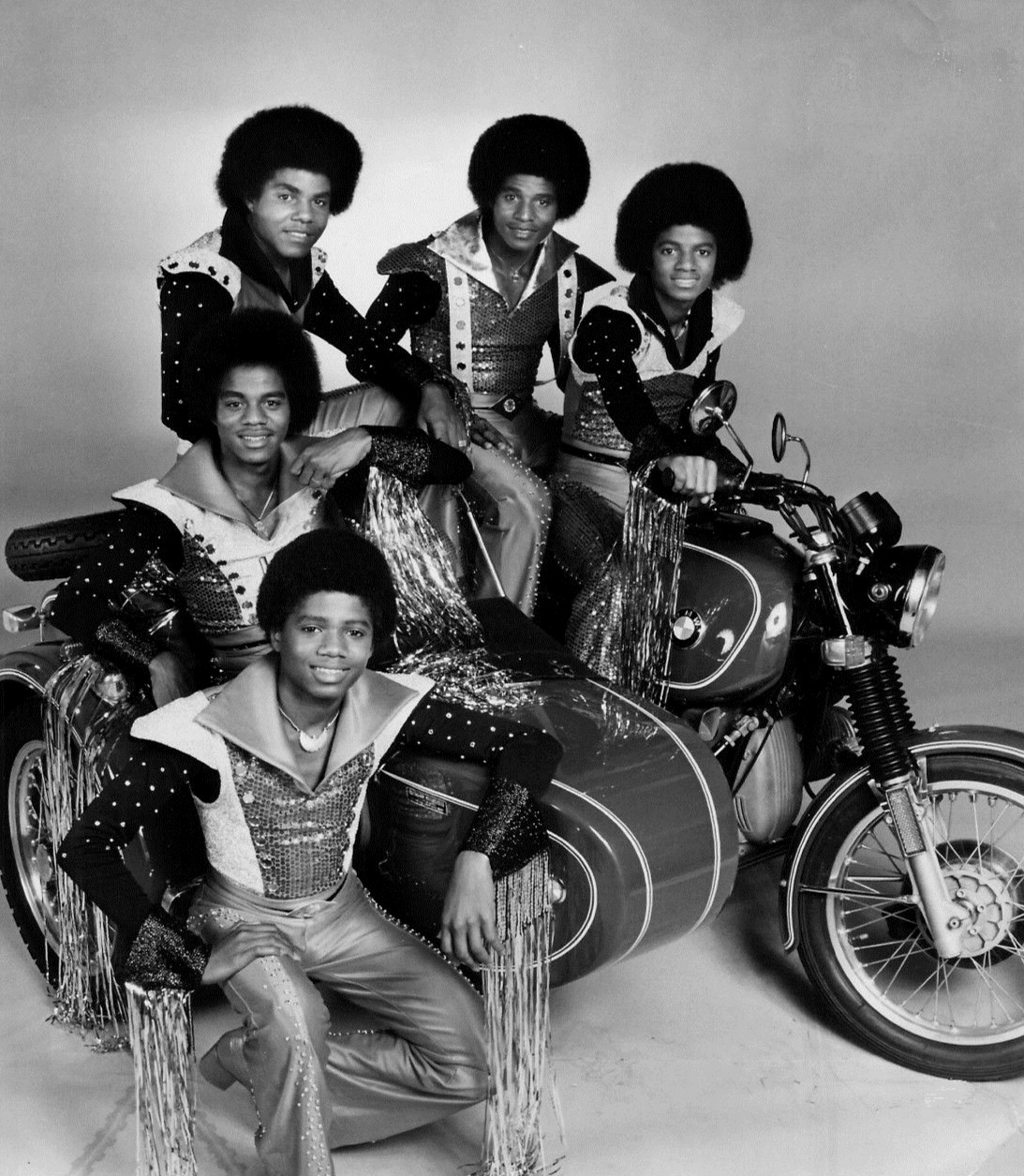
The Jacksons in 1977

In 1969, one year after the assassination of Dr. Martin Luther King Jr., there was a time when Black power movement and the civil rights movement were disintegrating. It was during this time that the Jackson 5 would emerge. The Jackson family was important to black culture. After the Lyndon B. Johnson administration declared the black family broken with the Moynihan Report, Motown and the Jackson family gave America and the world renewed faith in the American dream with an idealized image of domestic bliss. Black ascensionism was in the air. The Jackson family presented to America and the world a new positive image of black families. They changed the perception of the African-American male worldwide. The brothers became a household name and appealed equally to black and white audiences, breaking racial barriers.

In September 1971, Jackson 5ive television series ran as part of ABC's Saturday morning cartoon lineup. Jackson 5ive animation director Bob Balser insisted that the series would not include violence. The series was one of the first cartoon representations of a black family that did not include cheap gags and stereotyping. The Jackson 5 solved their problems with music and intellect as role models for families and their children.

In 1977, the Jackson 5 were among a small group of artists eligible to receive the newly minted Madison Square Garden Gold Ticket Award for selling over 100,000 tickets to their concerts there. They received the award from Madison Square Garden when they played there as the Jacksons in 1981. On September 3, 1980, the brothers were honored with a star on the Hollywood Walk of Fame as the Jacksons. As the Jackson 5, they were inducted into the Rock and Roll Hall of Fame in 1997 and the Vocal Group Hall of Fame in 1999. Two of the band's recordings ("ABC" and "I Want You Back") are among the Rock and Roll Hall of Fame's 500 Songs that Shaped Rock and Roll, while the latter track also included in the Grammy Hall of Fame. On September 8, 2008, the Jacksons were honored as BMI Icons at the annual BMI Urban Awards.

In 1992, Suzanne de Passe, Jermaine Jackson, and Stan Margulies worked with Motown to produce The Jacksons: An American Dream, a five-hour television miniseries broadcast based on the history of the Jackson family in a two-part special on ABC. The series tells the story of a hard working black family and their path to success and the American Dream.

The rise of the Jackson 5 in the 1960s and 1970s coincided with the rise of a similar musical family, the Osmonds. The white Mormon brothers from Utah, were thought to be an imitation of the black Jackson 5. Michael and Donny, the lead singers from each group developed a friendship. They both went on to pursue successful solo careers. Influenced by the Temptations, the Supremes, James Brown, Jackie Wilson, Sammy Davis Jr., the Teenagers and Sly and the Family Stone, the Jackson 5 eventually served as the inspiration for several generations of boy bands including New Edition, Boyz II Men, Menudo, New Kids on the Block, NSYNC, the Jonas Brothers, Backstreet Boys, One Direction, Silk Sonic, BTS and many more.

In 2012, Motown Records released a "two-disc undiscovered" Jackson 5 collection Come and Get It: The Rare Pearls. The archive contained several well-known covers and previously unreleased material, re-issued.

In 2017, on their 50th anniversary, the Jacksons released The Jacksons: Legacy, their first official behind-the-scenes chronicle book. The book includes new interviews and unseen photographs, and it tells the story of the Jackson family in their own words.

On June 15, 2018, the Jacksons accepted plaques bearing the keys to Detroit city. Detroit police chief James Craig, who presented the honors, declared the Motown group "truly Detroiters". They were also honored with a 90-minute tribute concert featuring Jackson 5, the Jacksons, Michael Jackson, Janet Jackson and Rebbie Jackson hits. The concert finale was Michael Jackson's "Don't Stop 'Til You Get Enough" with Greg Phillinganes, a Detroit native who worked with the Jacksons as a session player and tour musical director.

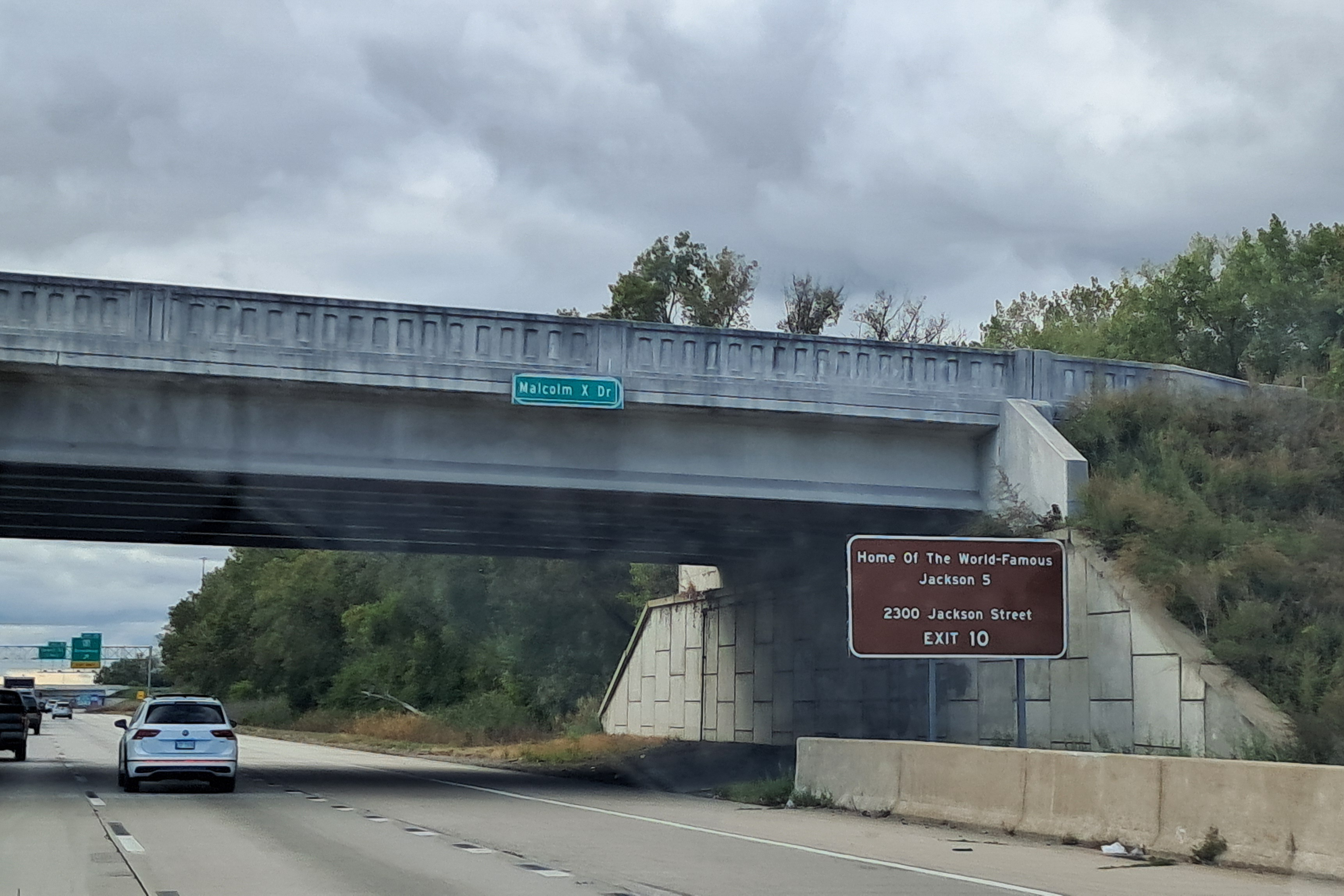
Highway sign on I-80/I-94/US 6 memorializing the Jackson family home

On May 13, 2021, guide signs for the "Home of the World-Famous Jackson 5" were installed on the Borman Expressway (I-80/I-94/US 6) and local roads, directing drivers to the Jackson family home at 2300 Jackson Street in Gary, Indiana. A gathering was held at the family home celebrating the installations. Among the participants were two members of the family (Marlon Jackson and Tito Jackson), the Lieutenant Governor of Indiana Suzanne Crouch, and state Senator Eddie Melton.

In August 2025, Marlon and Jackie Jackson returned to Gary for a two-day 2300 Jackson Street Block Party, that the city organized in celebration of the group's legacy. The event began on the 67th anniversary of Michael Jackson's birth and included a moment of silence acknowledging Tito Jackson's death. Gary native Deniece Williams performed during the event, which was months after the unveiling of a mural of the Jackson Five mural painted by Felix Maldonado.

== Awards and nominations ==
=== Grammy Awards ===
The Jackson 5 were nominated for a total of three Grammy Awards throughout their career.

| Year | Nominee / work | Award | Result |
|---|---|---|---|
| 1971 | "ABC" | Best Contemporary Vocal Performance by a Duo, Group or Chorus | Nominated |
| 1975 | "Dancing Machine" | Best R&B Vocal Performance by a Duo or Group | Nominated |
| 1981 | Triumph | Best R&B Vocal Performance by a Duo or Group | Nominated |

==== Grammy Hall of Fame ====
Three of the Jackson 5's songs were inducted into the Grammy Hall of Fame.

| Year | Nominee / work | Award | Result |
|---|---|---|---|
| 1999 | "I'll Be There" | Grammy Hall of Fame | Inducted |
| 1999 | "I Want You Back" | Grammy Hall of Fame | Inducted |
| 2017 | "ABC" | Grammy Hall of Fame | Inducted |

=== NAACP Image Awards ===
The Jackson 5 has won four NAACP Image Awards throughout their career.

| Year | Nominee / work | Award | Result |
|---|---|---|---|
| 1970 | The Jackson 5 | Best Vocal Group | Won |
| 1971 | The Jackson 5 | Best Vocal Group | Won |
| 1972 | The Jackson 5 | Best Vocal Group | Won |
| 1980 | The Jacksons | Best Vocal Group | Won |

=== United States Congress ===
The United States Congress is the bicameral legislature of the federal government of the United States of America, consisting of two houses, the Senate and the House of Representatives. They awarded the Jackson 5 with a "Special Commendation" for positive role models in 1972.

| Year | Nominee / work | Award | Result |
|---|---|---|---|
| 1972 | The Jackson 5 | Special Commendation for Positive Role Models | Honoree |

==== Congressional Black Caucus ====
| Year | Nominee / work | Award | Result |
|---|---|---|---|
| 1975 | The Jackson Five | Inducted As Honorary Members | Honoree |

=== Organisation of African Unity ===
| Year | Nominee / work | Award | Result |
|---|---|---|---|
| 1974 | The Jackson 5 | For strengthening Afro-Americans | Won |

=== BMI Awards ===
Broadcast Music, Incorporated (BMI) is one of two major United States performing rights organization, along with ASCAP. It collects license fees on behalf of songwriters, composers, and music publishers and distributes them as royalties to members whose works have been performed.

The Jacksons were honored with the BMI Icons award in 2008 and two of their songs, "Never Can Say Goodbye", and "Dancing Machine", were awarded to songwriters Clifton Davis in 1972 and Hal Davis, Dean Parks and Don Fletcher in 1975 respectively at the BMI Pop Awards; those awards weren't received by the Jackson 5.

==== BMI Urban Awards ====
| Year | Nominee / work | Award | Result |
|---|---|---|---|
| 2008 | The Jacksons | BMI Icon Award | Honoree |

=== Atlanta International Film Festival ===
| Year | Nominee / work | Award | Result |
|---|---|---|---|
| 1984 | The Jacksons | Bronze Medal Award (Pepsi TV ads) | Won |

=== Hollywood Walk of Fame ===
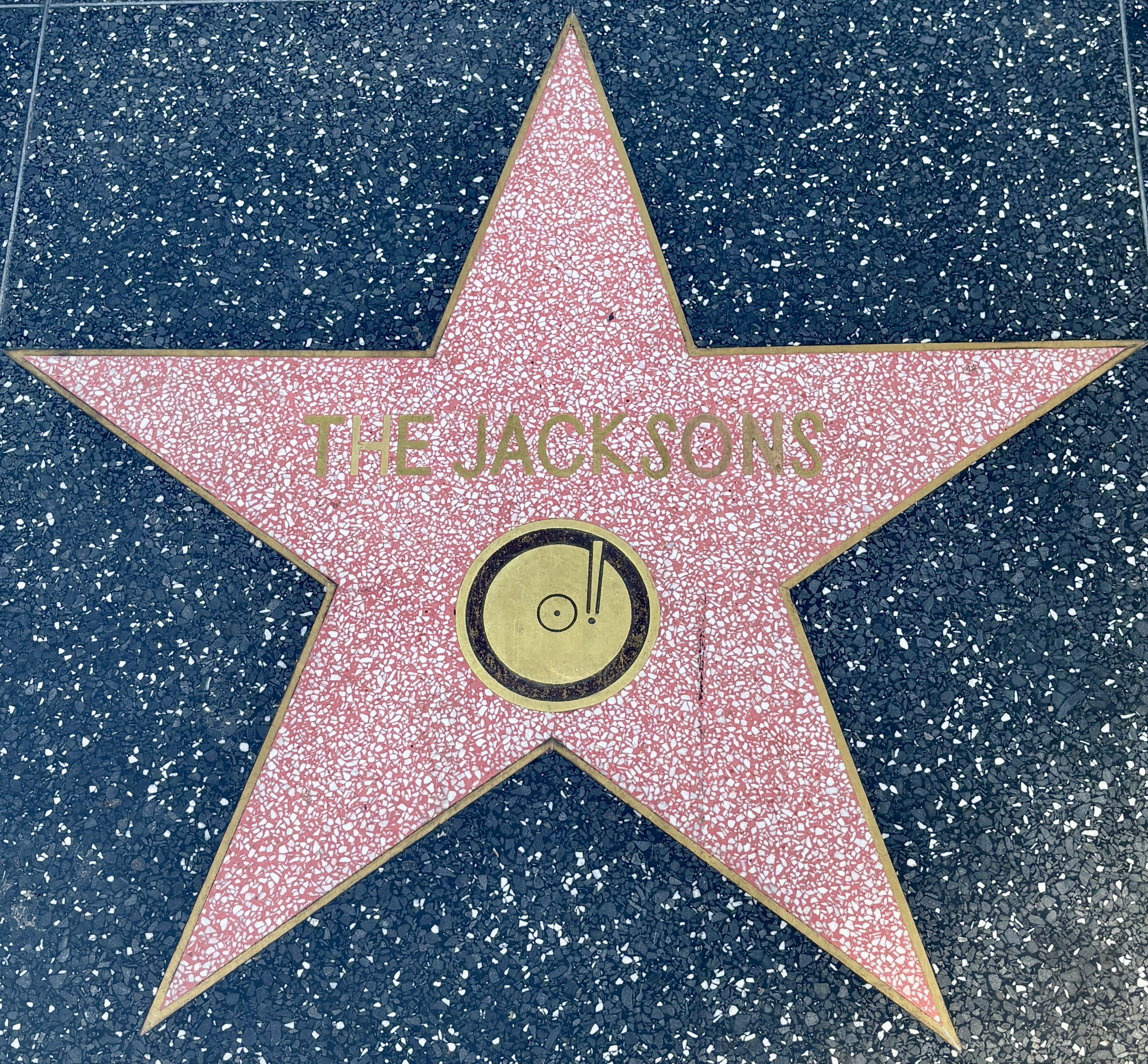
Hollywood Walk of Fame star

The Hollywood Walk of Fame is a sidewalk along Hollywood Boulevard and Vine Street in Hollywood, California, United States, that serves as an entertainment hall of fame. It is embedded with more than 2,000 five-pointed stars featuring the names of celebrities honored by the Hollywood Chamber of Commerce for their contributions to the entertainment industry.

The Jacksons received their star on September 3, 1980.

| Year | Nominee / work | Award | Result |
|---|---|---|---|
| 1980 | The Jacksons | Hollywood Walk of Fame Star | Won |

=== Rock and Roll Hall of Fame ===
The Rock and Roll Hall of Fame is a museum located on the shores of Lake Erie in downtown Cleveland, Ohio, United States, dedicated to recording the history of some of the best-known and most influential artists, producers, and other people who have in some major way influenced the music industry.

All of the original members of the Jackson 5 were inducted into the Rock and Roll Hall of Fame in 1997. Only Randy Jackson was not inducted alongside his brothers. They were subsequently inducted by Diana Ross and Berry Gordy.

| Year | Nominee / work | Award | Result |
|---|---|---|---|
| 1997 | The Jackson 5 | Rock and Roll Hall of Fame | Inducted |

=== Vocal Group Hall of Fame ===
The Vocal Group Hall of Fame (VGHF) was organized by Tony Butala, also the founder (and now only surviving original member) of the Lettermen, to honor outstanding vocal groups throughout the world. Headquartered in Sharon, Pennsylvania, it includes a theater and a museum.

The Jackson 5 were inducted in 1999.

| Year | Nominee / work | Award | Result |
|---|---|---|---|
| 1999 | The Jackson 5 | Vocal Group Hall of Fame | Inducted |

== Band members ==
=== Current ===
- Jackie Jackson – vocals, percussion (1964–1989, 2001, 2012–present)
- Marlon Jackson – vocals, percussion (1965–1985, 2001, 2012–present)

Touring

- TJ Wilkins – vocals
- Joseph Spencer – vocals
- Kyle Bolden – guitar
- Billy Wesson – keyboards
- Brandon Brown – bass
- Stacey Sydnor – drums

=== Former ===
- Tito Jackson – vocals, lead guitar, synthesizer (1964–1989, 2001, 2012–2024; died 2024)
- Jermaine Jackson – lead vocals, bass guitar (1964–1975, 1983–1989, 2001, 2012–2020)
- Michael Jackson – lead vocals, percussion (1965–1984, 2001; died 2009)
- Randy Jackson – keyboards, piano, percussion, vocals, bass (1971–1989, 2001)

== Discography ==
Motown releases (as the Jackson 5)

- Diana Ross Presents The Jackson 5 (1969)
- ABC (1970)
- Third Album (1970)
- Jackson 5 Christmas Album (1970)
- Maybe Tomorrow (1971)
- Lookin' Through the Windows (1972)
- Skywriter (1973)
- G.I.T.: Get It Together (1973)
- Dancing Machine (1974)
- Moving Violation (1975)

CBS/Epic releases (as the Jacksons)

- The Jacksons (1976)
- Goin' Places (1977)
- Destiny (1978)
- Triumph (1980)
- Victory (1984)
- 2300 Jackson Street (1989)

== Tours and residencies ==
=== Concert tours ===
As the Jackson 5

- The Jackson 5 First National Tour (1970)
- The Jackson 5 Second National Tour (1971)
- The Jackson 5 US Tour (1972)
- The Jackson 5 European Tour (1972)
- The Jackson 5 World Tour (1973–1975)
- The Jackson 5 Final Tour (1976)

As the Jacksons

- The Jacksons Tour (1976–1977)
- Goin' Places Tour (1978)
- Destiny World Tour (1979–1980)
- Triumph Tour (1981)
- Victory Tour (1984)
- Unity Tour (2012–2013)

=== Concert residencies ===
- The Jacksons at Planet Hollywood Las Vegas (2014)

== See also ==
- List of number-one hits (United States)
- List of artists who reached number one on the Hot 100 (U.S.)
- List of number-one dance hits (United States)
- List of highest-grossing concert tours
