= Jermaine Jackson discography =

- Studio albums: 14
- Compilation albums: 8
- Singles: 33

The discography of Jermaine Jackson includes 14 studio albums, 8 compilation albums, and 33 singles.

== Albums ==
=== Studio albums ===
Title	Details	Peak chart positions							Certifications
Title	Details	US	US R&B	AUS	NLD	NZ	SWE	UK	Certifications
Jermaine	Released July 14, 1972; Label: Motown; Formats: LP	27	6	—	—	—	—	—	
Come into My Life	Released: May 1973; Label: Motown; Formats: LP	152	30	—	—	—	—	—	
My Name Is Jermaine	Released: August 8, 1976; Label: Motown; Formats: LP	164	29	—	—	—	—	—	
Feel the Fire	Released: June 29, 1977; Label: Motown; Formats: LP	174	36	—	—	—	—	—	
Frontiers	Released: February 8, 1978; Label: Motown; Formats: LP	—	68	—	—	—	—	—	
Let's Get Serious	Released: March 17, 1980; Label: Motown; Formats: LP	6	1	78	—	—	—	22	RIAA: Gold
Jermaine	Released: October 10, 1980; Label: Motown; Formats: LP	44	17	—	—	—	—	—	
I Like Your Style	Released: August 28, 1981; Label: Motown; Formats: LP	86	31	—	—	—	—	—	
Let Me Tickle Your Fancy	Released: July 9, 1982; Label: Motown; Formats: LP, cassette	46	9	—	—	—	—	—	
Jermaine Jackson^{[a]}	Released: April 1984; Label: Arista; Formats: LP, CD, cassette	19	1	65	21	38	27	57	RIAA: Gold
Precious Moments	Released: February 13, 1986; Label: Arista; Formats: LP, CD, cassette	46	25	—	—	—	16	—	
Don't Take It Personal	Released: August 22, 1989; Label: Arista; Formats: LP, CD, cassette	115	18	—	—	—	—	—	
You Said	Released: October 29, 1991; Label: LaFace; Formats: LP, CD, cassette	—	39	—	—	—	—	—	
I Wish You L.O.V.E	Released: October 4, 2012; Label: Disques DOM; Formats: CD, digital download	—	—	—	—	—	—	—	
"—" denotes releases that did not chart or were not released in that territory.

=== Compilations ===
Title	Album details
Motown Superstar Series, Vol. 17	Released 1981; Label: Motown; Formats: LP
Greatest Hits and Rare Classics	Released: 1991; Label: Motown; Formats: CD
Dynamite: The Encore Collection	Released: August 3, 1999; Label: Sony; Formats: CD
The Heritage Collection	Released: February 8, 2000; Label: Arista; Formats: CD
Ultimate Collection	Released: June 26, 2001; Label: Hip-O; Formats: CD
Big Brother Jermaine: The Jermaine Jackson Collection	Released: March 12, 2007; Label: Spectrum; Formats: CD
Greatest Hits	Released: November 24, 2009; Label: 101 Distribution; Formats: CD, digital download
S.O.U.L.	Released: 2011; Label: Sony Music Entertainment; Formats: CD
Playlist: The Very Best of Jermaine Jackson	Released: January 21, 2014; Label: RCA; Formats: CD, digital download

== Singles ==
Title	Year	Peak chart positions												Certifications	Album
Title	Year	US	US R&B	U.S. CB	AUS	BEL (FL)	FRA	GER	IRE	NLD	NZ	SWI	UK	Certifications	Album
"That's How Love Goes" / "I Lost My Love in the Big City"	1972	46	23	43	—	—	—	—	—	—	—	—	—		Jermaine
"Daddy's Home"	1972	9	3	7	27	—	—	—	—	10	—	—	—		Jermaine
"You're in Good Hands"	1973	79	35	89	—	—	—	—	—	—	—	—	—		Come into My Life
"Let's Be Young Tonight"	1976	55	19	66	—	—	—	—	—	—	—	—	—		My Name Is Jermaine
"You Need to Be Loved"	1977	—	75	—	—	—	—	—	—	—	—	—	—		Feel the Fire
"Castles of Sand"	1978	—	38	—	—	—	—	—	—	—	—	—	—		Frontiers
"Let's Get Serious"	1980	9	1	9	24	30	—	—	17	24	—	—	8		Let's Get Serious
"You're Supposed to Keep Your Love for Me"	1980	34	31	46	—	—	—	—	—	—	—	—	—		Let's Get Serious
"Burnin' Hot"	1980	—	—	—	—	—	—	—	—	—	—	—	32		Let's Get Serious
"Little Girl Don't You Worry"	1980	—	17	—	—	—	—	—	—	—	—	—	—		Jermaine
"You Like Me Don't You"	1981	50	13	55	—	—	—	—	—	—	—	—	41		Jermaine
"I'm Just Too Shy"	1981	60	29	68	—	—	—	—	—	—	—	—	—		I Like Your Style
"Paradise in Your Eyes"	1982	—	60	—	—	—	—	—	—	—	—	—	—		I Like Your Style
"Let Me Tickle Your Fancy" (featuring Devo)	1982	18	5	22	—	—	—	—	—	—	—	—	—		Let Me Tickle Your Fancy
"Very Special Part"	1982	—	54	—	—	—	—	—	—	—	—	—	—		Let Me Tickle Your Fancy
"Sweetest Sweetest"	1984	—	—	—	57	9	—	—	—	20	18	—	52		Jermaine Jackson
"Dynamite"	1984	15	8	20	28	—	46	—	—	—	19	—	—		Jermaine Jackson
"Do What You Do"	1984	13	14	12	—	1	12	40	6	4	—	—	6	BPI: Silver	Jermaine Jackson
"When the Rain Begins to Fall" (with Pia Zadora)	1984	54	61	48	63	1	1	1	—	1	15	1	68	BVMI: Gold; SNEP: Platinum	Voyage of the Rock Aliens
"(Closest Thing To) Perfect"	1985	67	63	60	—	33	—	—	—	—	—	—	—		Perfect
"I Think It's Love"	1986	16	14	15	—	—	—	—	—	50	—	—	96		Precious Moments
"Lonely Won't Leave Me Alone"	1986	—	—	—	—	14	—	—	—	—	—	—	—		Precious Moments
"Do You Remember Me?'"	1986	71	40	66	—	—	—	—	—	—	—	—	—		Precious Moments
"Words into Action"	1987	—	90	—	—	35	—	—	—	—	—	—	—		Precious Moments
"Don't Take It Personal" / "Clean Up Your Act"	1989	64	1	78	—	—	—	—	—	—	—	69	—		Don't Take It Personal
"I'd Like to Get to Know You" / "Spare the Rod, Love the Child"	1990	—	27	—	—	—	—	—	—	—	—	—	—		Don't Take It Personal
"Two Ships (In the Night)"	1990	—	21	—	—	—	—	—	—	—	—	—	—		Don't Take It Personal
"Word to the Badd"	1991	78	88	—	—	—	—	—	—	—	—	—	—		You Said
"You Said, You Said"	1991	—	27	—	—	—	—	—	—	—	—	—	—		You Said
"I Dream, I Dream"	1992	—	30	—	—	—	—	—	—	—	—	—	—		You Said
"Blame It on the Boogie"	2011	—	—	—	—	—	—	—	—	—	—	—	—		Non-album singles
"Summer Time Feeling"	2015	—	—	—	—	—	—	—	—	—	—	—	—		Non-album singles
"Save Tomorrow"	2022	—	—	—	—	—	—	—	—	—	—	—	—		Non-album singles
"—" denotes releases that did not chart or were not released in that territory.

== Promotional singles ==
Title	Year	Album
"Tell Me I'm Not Dreamin' (Too Good to Be True)" (with Michael Jackson)	1984	Jermaine Jackson
"Smile" (Live from the Michael Jackson Memorial)	2009	Non-album single

== Notes ==
a Released internationally as Dynamite.
