= Don't Take It Personal =

Don't Take It Personal may refer to:

- "Don't Take It Personal (Just One of Dem Days)", a 1995 song by American R&B singer Monica
- Don't Take It Personal (album), a 1989 album by singer Jermaine Jackson
- "Don't Take It Personal" (Jermaine Jackson song), 1989
- Don't Take It Personal, a 2024 album by Dizzee Rascal
