= Glenn Medeiros (1987 album) =

Studio album by Glenn Medeiros
- Released: May 1987
- Studios: Monterey Sound Studios (Glendale, California); Conway Studios (Hollywood, California); PCI Studios (Rochester, New York)
- Genres: Pop rock, adult contemporary
- Length: 35:36
- Label: Amherst
- Producer: Jay Stone

Glenn Medeiros chronology
| Glenn Medeiros (1987) | Not Me (1988) |

Singles from Glenn Medeiros
- 1. "Nothing's Gonna Change My Love for You" Released: February 1987; 2. "Watching Over You" Released: June 1987; 3. "Lonely Won't Leave Me Alone" Released: December 1987; 4. "What's It Gonna Take" Released: 1987

Professional ratings
Review scores
| Source | Rating |
|---|---|
| AllMusic | 3/5 stars |

Glenn Medeiros is the self-titled debut album by American singer Glenn Medeiros, released in 1987. The album includes his cover version of George Benson's "Nothing's Gonna Change My Love for You", which was a massive worldwide hit, reaching No. 12 on the Billboard Hot 100 and spent four weeks at No. 1 on the UK Singles Chart in July 1988.

== Track listing ==
| No. | Title | Writer(s) | Length |
|---|---|---|---|
| 1. | "Nothing's Gonna Change My Love for You" | Gerry Goffin, Michael Masser | 3:52 |
| 2. | "Lonely Won't Leave Me Alone" | David Foster, Jermaine Jackson, Tom Keane, Kathy Wakefield | 4:26 |
| 3. | "The Wings of My Heart" | Keith Diamond, James Ingram | 3:31 |
| 4. | "A Stranger Tonight" | Marti Sharron, Chuck Wild | 4:46 |
| 5. | "Watching Over You" | Paul Howard Gordon | 4:11 |
| 6. | "What's It Gonna Take" | Johnny Elkins, Mike Greene | 3:33 |
| 7. | "A Fool's Affair" | Richard Kerr, Troy Seals | 3:48 |
| 8. | "You Left the Loneliest Heart" | Michael Jeffries, Jay Logan | 3:55 |
| 9. | "Knocking at Your Door" | Charlie Singleton | 4:01 |

== Personnel ==
- Glenn Medeiros – vocals, backing vocals
- "Reverend" David Boruff – synthesizer programming, saxophones
- Jay Gruska – keyboards, synthesizer programming
- Tom Keane – keyboards
- Bob Parr – synthesizer programming
- Ken Rarick – keyboards, synthesizer programming
- Jeff Gilhart – guitar solo (1)
- Michael Brady – bass
- Michael London – bass
- John Pierce – bass
- John Keane – drums
- Leeza Miller – vocals (9)

Music arrangements

- Jay Stone – arrangements (1)
- Michael Brady – vocal arrangements (1, 3–9)
- Tom Keane – musical and vocal arrangements (2), arrangements (4, 5, 7)
- Jay Gruska – arrangements (3, 8)
- John Ryan – arrangements (6, 9)

== Production ==
- Leonard Silver – executive producer
- Jay Stone – producer
- Jeff Tyzik – mixing (1)
- Mick Guzauski – mixing (2–9)
- Jeffrey "Woody" Woodruff – engineer
- Doug Carleton – second engineer
- Greg Scott – second engineer
- Bernie Grundman – mastering at Bernie Grundman Mastering (Hollywood, California)
- Brian D. McLaughlin – art direction, photography
- Barbara Rickard – packaging coordinator
- Carefree Management, Inc. – management

== Charts ==
Weekly chart performance for Glenn Medeiros
| Chart (1987–1988) | Peak position |
|---|---|
| Australian Albums (Kent Music Report) | 98 |
| Canada Top Albums/CDs (RPM) | 43 |
| Dutch Albums (Album Top 100) | 23 |
| Norwegian Albums (VG-lista) | 5 |
| Swedish Albums (Sverigetopplistan) | 35 |
| US Billboard 200 | 83 |
