= She Ain't Worth It =

1990 single by Glenn Medeiros

Single by Glenn Medeiros featuring Bobby Brown

from the album Glenn Medeiros (1990)
- B-side: "Victim of Love"
- Released: May 8, 1990
- Genre: New jack swing
- Length: 3:38
- Label: MCA, Amherst
- Songwriters: Antonina Armato, Bobby Brown, Ian Prince
- Producers: Denny Diante, Ian Prince

Glenn Medeiros singles chronology
"Nothing's Gonna Change My Love for You" (1987)	"She Ain't Worth It" (1990)	"All I'm Missing Is You" (1990)

Bobby Brown singles chronology
"Rock Wit'cha" (1989)	"She Ain't Worth It" (1990)	"Stone Cold Gentleman" (1991)

"She Ain't Worth It" is a song by American recording artist Glenn Medeiros featuring a rap from American R&B artist Bobby Brown. The song reached No. 1 for two weeks on the US Billboard Hot 100, becoming Medeiros' only No. 1 hit in the United States, and the second and last No. 1 hit where Brown has received credit as an artist, after "My Prerogative". The single also reached the top 20 on the UK Singles Chart, where Medeiros had previously reached number one with "Nothing's Gonna Change My Love for You", and peaked within the top 10 in Australia, Canada, Finland, and Ireland.

== Charts ==
=== Weekly charts ===
Chart (1990–1991)	Peak position
Australia (ARIA)	8
Belgium (Ultratop 50 Flanders)	21
Canada Top Singles (RPM)	9
Europe (Eurochart Hot 100)	24
Finland (Suomen virallinen lista)	9
Ireland (IRMA)	9
Netherlands (Dutch Top 40)	12
Netherlands (Single Top 100)	12
New Zealand (Recorded Music NZ)	14
UK Singles (Official Charts)	12
US Billboard Hot 100	1
US Hot Black Singles (Billboard)	43
US Cash Box Top 100	1
West Germany (GfK)	15

=== Year-end charts ===
Chart (1990)	Position
Canada Top Singles (RPM)	89
US Billboard Hot 100	24
US Cash Box Top 100	28

== Certifications ==
Region	Certification	Certified units/sales
Australia (ARIA)	Gold	35,000^{^}
United States (RIAA)	Gold	500,000^{^}
^{^} Shipments figures based on certification alone.

== Release history ==
Region	Date	Format(s)	Label(s)	Ref.
United States	May 8, 1990	7-inch vinyl; 12-inch vinyl; cassette	MCA; Amherst	
Japan	July 5, 1990	Mini-CD	Mercury	
Australia	July 23, 1990	7-inch vinyl; 12-inch vinyl; CD; cassette	Mercury	
