= Michael Lovesmith =

American R&B singer, record producer and executive

Michael Lovesmith (born Michael Larry Smith, 1953) is an American R&B singer, songwriter, musician, record producer and executive. He has sometimes been credited as Michael L. Smith.

== Life and career ==
Born in St Louis, Missouri, he wrote songs for Isaac Hayes and The Isley Brothers, and formed a group with his brothers Danny and Louis Smith, the Smith Connection. They moved to Los Angeles, where they recorded for the Music Merchant label set up by Holland, Dozier and Holland as an offshoot of Invictus Records. They recorded the album Under My Wings (1972), and had a number 28 R&B hit in 1973 with "(I've Been a Winner, I've Been a Loser) I've Been in Love".

Using the name Michael Lovesmith for some credits, he also began working on record production with the vocal trio Honey Cone. He was signed by Motown as a songwriter, and with Brian Holland co-wrote "All I Do Is Think of You" for the Jackson 5. The recording reached number 50 on the R&B chart in 1975. The song was revived in 1990 by the band Troop, and reached number one on the R&B chart. Lovesmith also worked as a writer, arranger and co-producer of Jermaine Jackson's 1976 album My Name Is Jermaine, and co-wrote the album's most successful single, "Let's Be Young Tonight", which reached number 19 on the R&B chart. He co-wrote and produced the title track of Thelma Houston's 1976 album, Any Way You Like It, and, in 1977, wrote and produced the album Rich Love, Poor Love by Syreeta and G.C. Cameron. He also featured as a singer on the 1981 album by Ozone, Jump On It.

In 1981, with his brothers Danny, Louis and Aaron Smith, he recorded the album Lovesmith, released by Motown and executive produced by Jermaine Jackson. He then recorded as a solo artist, releasing the albums I Can Make It Happen (1983), Diamond in the Raw (1984), and Rhymes of Passion (1985). Two singles reached the lower reaches of the R&B charts: "Baby I Will" (#80, 1983) and "Break the Ice" (#82, 1985). Lovesmith also sang background vocals on Luther Vandross's 1988 album Any Love, and wrote and produced the 1995 debut albums by Motown groups Mind, Heart & Soul, and Harem.

In the 1990s, Lovesmith moved into management as an executive at Jobete Music. He later became President of West Grand Media Inc., which manages many of Motown's assets. He was also executive producer of the traveling show Motown: The Musical.

== Discography ==
=== Albums ===
The Smith Connection

- Under My Wings (1972)

Lovesmith

- Lovesmith (1981)

Michael Lovesmith

- I Can Make It Happen (1983)
- Diamond in the Raw (1984)
- Rhymes of Passion (1985)
