= Not Me (album) =

Studio album by Glenn Medeiros
- Released: September 19, 1988 (UK)
- Studio: Lion Share Studios, Rhett Lawrence Studios, The Complex and Motown/Hitsville U.S.A. Studios (Los Angeles, California); Conway Studios (Hollywood, California); Schnee Studios (North Hollywood, California); The Hop (Sherman Oaks, California); Alpha Studios (Burbank, California); Tyzik Studios (Rochester, New York)
- Genre: Pop, dance-pop, pop rock
- Length: 51:57
- Label: MCA, Mercury, PolyGram
- Producer: Leonard Silver (exec.); Humberto Gatica, Tom Keane, The Crew; Robbie Buchanan; Michael Masser; Peter Bunetta; Rick Chudacoff

Glenn Medeiros chronology
Glenn Medeiros (1987)	Not Me (1988)	Glenn Medeiros (1990)

Professional ratings
Review scores
Source	Rating
AllMusic	link

Not Me is the second full-length album by American singer Glenn Medeiros. It was released in September 1988 one year after the release of Medeiros' self-titled debut album. Two singles were released to promote the album, each with a promotional music video. The first, "Long and Lasting Love", peaked at No. 68 on the Billboard Hot 100 before the album's release and it also charted in several European countries.

The second single, "Never Get Enough of You", followed in early-1989. This was also released as a 12-inch single, featuring an extended version of the track as well as a radio remix, but it failed to chart. In some international countries, the album includes a version of "Nothing's Gonna Change My Love for You"; the original single version of the song, which had become a big hit in various European countries in 1988.

== Track listing ==
No.	Title	Writer(s)	Length
1.	"Fallin'"	Michael Bolton; Bobby Caldwell	3:52
2.	"Never Get Enough of You"	Andre Pessis; Kevin Wells	4:27
3.	"I Don't Want to Lose Your Love"	Nick Jamieson; Kim O'Leary	4:26
4.	"No Way Out of Love"	Peter Bunetta; Joe Ericksen; Charlene Seeger	4:20
5.	"You're My Woman, You're My Lady"	Jeff Tyzik	3:42
6.	"Love Always Finds a Reason" (duet with Elsa)	Robbie Buchanan; Diane Warren	4:33
7.	"Someday Love"	Terry Cox; Nick DiStefano	4:33
8.	"Long and Lasting Love (Once in a Lifetime)"	Gerry Goffin; Michael Masser	3:39
9.	"Heart Don't Change My Mind"	Buchanan; Warren	4:43
10.	"I Don't Wanna Say Goodnight"	Tom Keane; Eric Pressly	4:47
11.	"Not Me"	Paul Anka; Deke Rivers	3:56
12.	"Un Roman d'amitié (Friend You Give Me a Reason)" (duet with Elsa)	Buchanan; Warren; Didier Barbelivien	4:26

Note

- Track 12 on some international versions of the album is replaced with "Nothing's Gonna Change My Love for You ('88 Style)".

== Personnel ==
- Glenn Medeiros – vocals
- Rhett Lawrence – synthesizer programming (1, 7, 10), synth bass (1), drums (10)
- Brad Cole – keyboards (2)
- Aaron Zigman – keyboards (2, 4)
- Randy Waldman – synthesizers (3)
- Andy Calabrese – keyboards (5)
- Jeff Tyzik – keyboards (5)
- Robbie Buchanan – keyboards (6, 9, 11), Fender Rhodes (8)
- Michael Boddicker – synthesizer programming (7)
- Michael Landau – guitars (1, 7)
- David Williams – guitars (2)
- Michael Thompson – guitars (3, 10)
- Dann Huff – guitars (4, 6, 9, 11)
- Chet Catallo – guitars (5)
- Paul Jackson Jr. – guitars (8, 10)
- Tom Keane – synth bass (1, 10), backing vocals (1, 7, 10), drums (10)
- Rick Chudacoff – synth bass (2), keyboards (4)
- Rich Nevens – bass programming (3), drums (3)
- Ralph Ortiz – bass (5)
- Nathan East – bass (7)
- Neil Stubenhaus – bass (8)
- Jeff Porcaro – drums (1, 7)
- Peter Bunetta – drums (2), percussion (2), synth bass (4)
- Dave Cohen – drums (5)
- John Robinson – drums (8)
- Lenny Castro – percussion (7)
- Jimmy Roberts – sax solo (2)
- Eli Epstein – French horn (5)
- Wilfred Deglans – concertmaster (5)
- Bobby Caldwell – backing vocals (1, 7)
- Leslie Smith – backing vocals (2, 4)
- Kevin Wells – backing vocals (2, 4)
- Jim Haas – backing vocals (3)
- Edie Lehmann – backing vocals (3)
- Clif Magness – backing vocals (3)
- Elsa Lunghini – vocals (6, 12)
- Jason Scheff – backing vocals (10)
- Bill Champlin – backing vocals (11)
- Tommy Funderburk – backing vocals (11)

"Nothing's Gonna Change My Love for You"

- Glenn Medeiros – vocals
- Paul Mariconda – keyboards
- Mitch Coodley – guitars
- Paul Adamy – bass
- Cedric Samson – drums
- Rick Gallwey – percussion

Music arrangements

- Humberto Gatica – arrangements (1, 7, 10)
- Tom Keane – arrangements (1, 7, 10)
- Peter Bunetta – arrangements (2, 4)
- Rick Chudacoff – arrangements (2, 4)
- Rich Nevens – arrangements (3)
- Randy Waldman – arrangements (3)
- Jeff Tyzik – arrangements (5), string and French horn arrangements on "Nothing's Gonna Change My Love for You"
- Robbie Buchanan – arrangements (6, 8, 9)
- Jeremy Lubbock – string arrangements and conductor (8)

== Production ==
- Leonard Silver – executive producer
- Humberto Gatica – producer (1, 7, 10)
- Tom Keane – producer (1, 7, 10)
- Peter Bunetta – producer (2, 4)
- The Crew – producers (3, 11)
- Rick Chudacoff – producer (2, 4)
- Jeff Tyzik – producer (5), "Nothing's Gonna Change My Love for You"
- Robbie Buchanan – producer (6, 9, 11)
- Michael Masser – producer (8)
- Glenn Medeiros –producer on "Nothing's Gonna Change My Love for You"
- Angela Bland – production coordinator (1, 7, 10)
- Abrahams Pants – design
- Paul Cox – photography
- Carefree Management, Inc. – management

Technical credits

- Stephen Marcussen – mastering at Precision Lacquer (Hollywood, California)
- Humberto Gatica – engineer (1, 7, 10), mixing (1, 6, 7, 10)
- Daren Klein – engineer (2, 4)
- Frank Wolf – engineer (2, 4), recording (3, 6, 9, 11)
- Mick Guzauski – mixing (2–4)
- Miles Christensen – recording (3)
- Jeff Tyzik – mixing (5)
- Gary Wagner – mixing (5)
- Dennis Mackay – string recording (8)
- Russ Terrana – mixing (8)
- Bill Schnee – mixing (9, 11)
- Rhett Lawrence – additional engineer (1, 7, 10), assistant engineer (1, 7, 10)
- Mauricio Guerrero – assistant engineer (1, 7, 10), assistant mix engineer (1, 7, 10)
- Karl Gruenewald – assistant engineer (1, 7, 10)
- Laura Livingston – assistant engineer (1, 7, 10), assistant mix engineer (1, 7, 10), recording (3), mix assistant (6)
- Ray Pyle – assistant engineer (1, 7, 10)
- Bryan Arnett – assistant engineer (2, 4)
- Marnie Riley – assistant engineer (2, 4)
- Steve Satkowski – assistant engineer (2, 4)
- Wade Jaynes – mix assistant (9, 11)
- Barton Stevens – mix assistant (9, 11)

"Nothing's Gonna Change My Love for You"

- Phil Magnotti – engineer, mixing
- Matt Lane – assistant engineer, mix assistant

== Charts ==
Weekly chart performance for Not Me by Glenn Medeiros
Chart (1988)	Peak position
Australian Albums (ARIA)	124
Dutch Albums (Album Top 100)	83
UK Albums (OCC)	63

== Sales and certifications ==
Certifications for Not Me
Region	Certification	Certified units/sales
France (SNEP)	Gold	100,000^{*}
Spain (PROMUSICAE)	Gold	50,000^{^}
^{*} Sales figures based on certification alone.^{^} Shipments figures based on certification alone.
