= Do You Remember Me? =

Do You Remember Me? may refer to:

- Do You Remember Me? (film), a 2014 comedy film
- "Do You Remember Me?" (song), a 1986 single by Jermaine Jackson
- "Do You Remember Me?", a song performed by Perry Como
- "Lila's Theme", known as "Do You Remember Me?", a song from the 1972 film Snoopy Come Home
- "Do You Remember Me?", a 1990 single by Amanda Lear
- "Do You Remember Me?", a 1995 song by Wizo
- "Do You Remember Me?", a 2000 song by Lucy Street
- "Do You Remember Me?", a 2014 song by Morten Harket
