= Precious Moments (album) =

Studio album by Jermaine Jackson
- Released: February 13, 1986
- Recorded: 1984–1985
- Studio: Lighthouse Studios (North Hollywood, California); Lion Share Studios and Soundcastle Studios (Los Angeles, California); Evergreen Studios (Burbank, California)
- Genre: R&B
- Length: 46:42
- Label: Arista; BMG
- Producer: Michael Omartian (Tracks 1, 3, 5, 9 & 10); Jermaine Jackson and Tom Keane (Tracks 2, 4 & 6–8)

Jermaine Jackson chronology
Dynamite (1984)	Precious Moments (1986)	Don't Take It Personal (1989)

Singles from Precious Moments
- 1. "I Think It's Love" Released: January 1986; 2. "Lonely Won't Leave Me Alone" Released: May 1986; 3. "Do You Remember Me?" Released: June 1986; 4. "Words Into Action" Released: December 1986

Professional ratings
Review scores
Source	Rating
Allmusic	2/5 stars

Precious Moments is the eleventh studio album, and second on Arista Records, from Jermaine Jackson. Released in 1986, the album includes the pop and R&B top-20 hit, "I Think It's Love" (co-written with Stevie Wonder) along with the top 40 US R&B hit "Do You Remember Me?", and top 40 Belgian hits "Lonely Won't Leave Me Alone" and "Words Into Action".

The album track, "If You Say My Eyes Are Beautiful," a duet with Whitney Houston was never released as a single; however, the ballad received significant radio airplay at the time and was included on Houston's 2000 compilation Whitney: The Greatest Hits.

"Words Into Action" was featured in the 1986 film About Last Night and included on the film's soundtrack album.

== Track listing ==
1. "Do You Remember Me?" (Jermaine Jackson, Michael Omartian, Bruce Sudano) – 5:03
2. "Lonely Won't Leave Me Alone" (Jackson, Tom Keane, Kathy Wakefield, David Foster) – 4:30
3. "Give a Little Love" (David Malloy, Rodney Crowell) – 3:53
4. "Precious Moments" (Jackson, Keane) – 5:10
5. "I Think It's Love" (Jackson, Omartian, Stevie Wonder) – 3:52
6. "Our Love Story" (Jackson, Keane, David Batteau) – 4:31
7. "I Hear Heartbeat" (Mick Leeson, Peter Vale) – 5:39
8. "If You Say My Eyes Are Beautiful" (duet with Whitney Houston) (Elliot Willensky) – 4:19
9. "Voices in the Dark" (Jackson, Omartian) – 4:36
10. "Words into Action" (Leeson, Vale) – 4:55

=== 2012 remaster (Expanded Edition) ===
11. "(Closest Thing To) Perfect" (extended version)
12. "I Think It's Love" (extended remix)
13. "Do You Remember Me?" (Michael Omartian remix)
14. "Do You Remember Me?" (Jellybean remix)
15. "Do You Remember Me?" (Bruce Forest remix)

B-side

- "Whatcha Doin'" (from the single "Do You Remember Me?")

== Personnel ==
Musicians and Vocalists

- Jermaine Jackson – lead vocals, backing vocals
- Michael Omartian – keyboards (1, 3, 5, 9), synthesizers (1, 3, 5, 9, 10), drum programming (1, 5, 9), drums (3), drum machines (10)
- Marcus Ryle – synthesizer programming (1, 3, 5, 9)
- Tom Keane – keyboards (2, 4, 6, 8), synthesizers (2, 4, 6, 8), drums (4), backing vocals (4, 6, 7), drum programming (6)
- Bo Tomlyn – keyboards (2, 4, 6, 8), synthesizers (2, 4, 6, 8)
- Dean Gant – keyboards (7), synthesizers (7), drums (7)
- Michael Landau – guitars (1–6, 8, 9)
- Paul Jackson, Jr. – guitars (7)
- Steve Lukather – guitars (8)
- Dann Huff – guitars (10)
- John Robinson – drums (2, 3)
- John Keane – drums (8)
- Paulinho da Costa – percussion (1, 4–6, 8, 9)
- Gary Herbig – saxophones (1, 3, 5, 9)
- Kim Hutchcroft – saxophones (1, 5, 9)
- Marc Russo – saxophone (4)
- Ernie Watts – saxophone (10)
- Chuck Findley – trombone (1, 5, 9)
- Gary Grant – trumpet (1, 5, 9)
- Jerry Hey – trumpet (1, 5, 9)
- Vesta Williams – backing vocals (1)
- Portia Griffin – backing vocals (2, 5)
- Julia Tillman Waters – backing vocals (2, 6)
- Maxine Waters Willard – backing vocals (2, 6)
- Mona Lisa Young – backing vocals (5)
- Whitney Houston – lead vocals (8)

Music arrangements

- Michael Omartian – arrangements (1, 3, 5, 9, 10)
- Tom Keane – arrangements (2, 4, 6–8)
- Jeremy Lubbock – string arrangements (2)
- Jerry Hey – horn arrangements (5)
- Jermaine Jackson – horn arrangements (5)

== Production ==
- Clive Davis – executive producer
- Michael Omartian – producer (1, 3, 5, 9, 10)
- Jermaine Jackson – producer (2, 4, 6–8)
- Tom Keane – producer (2, 4, 6–8)
- Terry Christian – engineer (1, 3, 5, 9, 10)
- John Guess – mixing (1, 3, 9, 10)
- Steve Hodge – engineer (2, 4, 6–8), mixing (2, 4, 6–8)
- Humberto Gatica – remixing (2, 6), mixing (3, 5)
- Michael Hutchinson – vocal recording for Whitney Houston (8)
- Ria Lewerke – art direction
- Paul Jasmin – artwork

== Charts ==
Chart (1986)	Peak position
Dutch Albums Chart	53
Swedish Albums Chart	16
US Billboard 200	46
US Top R&B Albums	25
