= I'm Just Too Shy =

Single by Jermaine Jackson

from the album I Like Your Style
- B-side: "All Because of You"
- Released: September 1981
- Recorded: 1981
- Genre: R&B
- Length: 3:45
- Label: Motown
- Songwriter: Jermaine Jackson
- Producer: Jermaine Jackson

Jermaine Jackson singles chronology
"You Like Me Don't You" (1981)	"I'm Just Too Shy" (1981)	"Paradise In Your Eyes" (1982)

"I'm Just Too Shy" is a song recorded by American R&B singer Jermaine Jackson, a former member of The Jackson 5. It was released as the first single from his 1981 album, I Like Your Style, in September of that year.

Record World said that "Jackson's fragile falsetto skips lightly over q delicate, mid-tempo rhythm while high harmonies carry the hook."

== Charts ==
Chart (1981–82)	Peak position
U.S. Billboard Hot 100	60
U.S. Billboard Hot Black Singles	29
