= Lonely Won't Leave Me Alone (Jermaine Jackson song) =

Single by Jermaine Jackson

from the album Precious Moments
- B-side: "Our Love Story"
- Released: May 1986
- Recorded: 1985
- Genre: Contemporary R&B
- Length: 4:30
- Label: Arista
- Songwriters: David Foster, Jermaine Jackson, Tom Keane, Kathy Wakefield
- Producers: Jermaine Jackson, Tom Keane

Jermaine Jackson singles chronology
| "I Think It's Love" (1986) | "Lonely Won't Leave Me Alone" (1986) | "Do You Remember Me?" (1986) |

"Lonely Won't Leave Me Alone" is a song co-written by Jermaine Jackson, David Foster, Tom Keane, and Kathy Wakefield. It was recorded by Jackson in 1986 from his album Precious Moments, and later by Glenn Medeiros in 1987.

== Notable releases ==
=== Original version ===
"Lonely Won't Leave Me Alone" was originally recorded by Jackson. It was the second single released from his eleventh studio album, Precious Moments, and his twenty-third single overall. In Jackson's book You Are Not Alone, Jackson describes how, after leaving the Jackson 5, fans often turned on him. Some even refused his autograph, accusing him of betraying his brothers. Having been used to constant praise, this rejection felt like a harsh blow. Yet, from that dark period came inspiration—his first real encounter with loneliness motivated him to write the song.

=== Glenn Medeiros version ===
"Lonely Won't Leave Me Alone" was later recorded by American pop artist Glenn Medeiros. It was the second single released from his self-titled debut album. It reached number 67 on the Billboard Hot 100 on January 30, 1988.

== Adaptation ==
"Lonely Won't Leave Me Alone" was covered in a Cantonese version as "千億個夜晚" ("A Hundred Billion Nights") and released on the album 《千億個夜晚》 by George Lam. (1986)
