= Glenn Medeiros (1990 album) =

Studio album by Glenn Medeiros
- Released: May 29, 1990
- Studio: Conway and Sunset Sound (Hollywood, California); Studio Sound and Ameraycan (North Hollywood, California); Westlake and Summa (Los Angeles, California); Sigma Sound (Philadelphia, Pennsylvania); Musicplex (Atlanta, Georgia)
- Genre: Electronic; Funk; Hip-Hop; Soul
- Length: 40:39
- Label: MCA; Mercury
- Producer: Denny Diante; Ian Prince; Antonina Armato; Jon Gass; Bobby Brown; Ray Parker Jr.

Glenn Medeiros chronology
| Not Me (1988) | Glenn Medeiros (1990) | It's Alright to Love (1993) |

Alternative cover
- Cover for the UK version of the album

Professional ratings
Review scores
| Source | Rating |
|---|---|
| AllMusic | 4/5 stars |
| Chicago Tribune | 2.5/4 stars |

Glenn Medeiros is the third album, and second self-titled album, by American singer Glenn Medeiros. It was released in 1990 and includes the US Billboard Hot 100 No. 1 single "She Ain't Worth It", featuring Bobby Brown.

== Track listing ==
| No. | Title | Writer(s) | Length |
|---|---|---|---|
| 1. | "Cracked Up" | Antonina Armato; Ian Prince | 4:04 |
| 2. | "The Best Man" | Armato; Prince; Glenn Medeiros | 3:59 |
| 3. | "Niki" | Armato; Prince; Medeiros | 4:18 |
| 4. | "Just Like Rain" | Armato; Prince | 4:19 |
| 5. | "Boyfriend" | Armato; Prince | 3:45 |
| 6. | "She Ain't Worth It" (featuring Bobby Brown) | Armato; Prince; Brown | 3:35 |
| 7. | "Me − U = Blue" (featuring The Stylistics) | Franne Golde; Andy Goldmark; Bruce Roberts | 4:27 |
| 8. | "LovelyLittleLady" | Brown | 3:36 |
| 9. | "All I'm Missing Is You" (featuring Ray Parker Jr.) | Armato; Parker | 4:18 |
| 10. | "Doesn't Matter Anymore" | Armato | 4:11 |

== Personnel ==
=== Musicians ===
- Glenn Medeiros – vocals (all tracks), backing vocals (9)
- Alex Alessandroni – keyboard programming (8), drum programming (8)
- Bobby Brown – keyboards (8), rap (6), human beatbox (6), additional programming (8)
- Paulinho da Costa – percussion (3)
- George Englund Jr. – saxophone (3, 4)
- Bruce Gaitsch – guitars (6, 7)
- Siedah Garrett – backing vocals (2)
- Dorian Holley – backing vocals (5)
- Chris Horvath – guitars (8)
- Paul Jackson Jr. – guitars (1)
- Mindy Lee – backing vocals (9)
- Robert Palmer – guitars (2, 3, 5)
- Ray Parker Jr. – additional drum programming (4), keyboards (9), synthesizer programming (9), guitars (9), drum programming (9), arrangements (9), backing vocals (9)
- Phil Perry – backing vocals (1)
- Ian Prince – keyboards (2–6, 10), synthesizer programming (2–6, 10), drum programming (2–6, 10), arrangements (2–6, 10), percussion programming (3–6, 10), Master Tracks Pro 4 (3–6, 10), backing vocals (5, 6)
- Nadirah Shakoor – backing vocals (3, 5)
- Neil Stubenhaus – bass (4)
- The Stylistics – backing vocals (7)
- Harold Travis – backing vocals (8)
- Ralph Tresvant – backing vocals (8)
- Randy Waldman – keyboards (1, 4, 7), synthesizer programming (1, 7), drum programming (1, 7), arrangements (1, 7), additional keyboards (10)
- Val Young – backing vocals (8)

=== Technical ===
- Denny Diante – producer (1, 2, 6, 7, 10)
- Ian Prince – producer (2–6, 10)
- Antonina Armato – producer (4)
- Bobby Brown – producer (8)
- Ray Parker Jr. – producer (9)
- Jon Gass – additional production (6)
- Leonard Silver – executive producer
- Jimmy Wachtel – art direction, design
- Carefree Management, Inc. – management
- Bernie Grundman – mastering at Bernie Grundman Mastering (Hollywood, California)
- Mick Guzauski – recording (1, 7), mixing (1, 2, 4, 7, 9)
- Ted Blaisdell – recording (2–6, 10), mixing (3, 5)
- Jon Gass – mixing (6)
- Mike Tarsia – vocal recording for The Stylistics (7)
- Tom Nellen – recording (8)
- Mike Piersante – recording (8)
- Bobby Brown – mixing (8)
- George Pappas – mixing (8)
- Ray Parker Jr. – recording (9)
- Marnie Riley – assistant engineer (1, 6), assistant mix engineer (2, 4, 9), additional assistant engineer (4)
- Steve Blazina – assistant engineer (2)
- Darryl Dobson – assistant engineer (3–6, 10)
- Steve Harrison – assistant engineer (5)
- Al Faggiolo – assistant vocal engineer (7)
- Bryant Arnett – additional recording (4, 10), assistant engineer (6, 7), assistant mix engineer (10)
- Randee St. Nicholas – photography

== Charts ==
| Chart (1990) | Peak position |
|---|---|
| Australian Albums (ARIA) | 69 |
| US Billboard 200 | 82 |
| US Top R&B/Hip-Hop Albums | 93 |
