= Little Girl Don't You Worry =

Single by Jermaine Jackson

from the album Jermaine
- B-side: "We Can Put It Back Together"
- Released: October 1980
- Recorded: 1980
- Genre: R&B
- Length: 4:48
- Label: Motown
- Songwriter: Jermaine Jackson
- Producer: Jermaine Jackson

Jermaine Jackson singles chronology
"You're Supposed to Keep Your Love for Me" (1980)	"Little Girl Don't You Worry" (1980)	"You Like Me Don't You" (1981)

"Little Girl Don't You Worry" is a song written and recorded by American R&B singer Jermaine Jackson. It was released as the first single from his 1980 album, Jermaine, in October that same year.

Record World called it a "unique, well-crafted [song with Jermaine's] bold vocal up front with spanking percussion & chorus cushions."

== Charts ==
Chart (1980–81)	Peak position
U.S. Billboard Hot Black Singles	17
