= Glenn Medeiros =

American singer (born 1970)

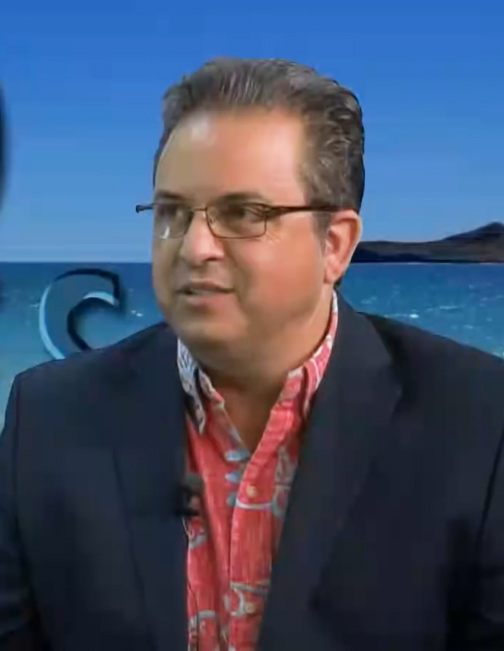
- Medeiros in 2018
- Born: Glenn Alan Medeiros; June 24, 1970 (age 56); Lihue, Hawaii, U.S.
- Education: University of Hawaiʻi at West Oʻahu; University of Phoenix; University of Southern California
- Occupations: Musician; singer; songwriter; educator
- Musical career
- Origin: Honolulu, Hawaii, United States
- Genres: Pop rock; adult contemporary; R&B
- Instruments: Vocals; piano; guitar
- Years active: 1986–2007
- Labels: Amherst; MCA

Glenn Alan Medeiros (born June 24, 1970) is an American former singer best known for his 1987 George Benson cover, "Nothing's Gonna Change My Love for You", which peaked at number 12 on the Billboard Hot 100. Outside of the United States, Medeiros's version of "Nothing's Gonna Change My Love for You" topped the charts in several countries, including Canada, France, Ireland, the Netherlands, and the United Kingdom.

In 1988, he followed that single with "Un Roman d'amitié (Friend You Give Me a Reason)", a duet with Elsa Lunghini which achieved huge success in France where it managed to top the chart for six consecutive weeks, and remained on the Top 50 chart for 25 weeks. In 1990, Medeiros also collaborated with R&B artist Bobby Brown for the hit "She Ain't Worth It", a certified-Gold US and international chart-topper.

== Personal life ==
Of Portuguese ancestry, Medeiros was born in Līhuʻe, Kauaʻi, Hawaii, and raised in Lāwaʻi; he was baptized and raised Catholic. He and his wife, Tammy Armstrong, have been married since 1996. They have a son, Chord Kaleohone Medeiros (born 2000), and a daughter, Lyric Leolani Medeiros (born 2001), who appeared on Season 21 of American Idol and Season 28 of Big Brother US. She was evicted on day 31 after a 8-3 vote. In February 2026, Medeiros was featured on "viral" videos on his daughter's TikTok account.

== Music career ==
1986–1989: Early career and breakthrough

In 1986, at the age of 16, Medeiros won Brown Bags to Stardom, a local radio talent contest at KIKI radio in his hometown of Honolulu, when he performed a cover version of George Benson's "Nothing's Gonna Change My Love for You" which was subsequently produced into an album by a small local independent label. Jay Stone, the program director, produced the song, which by January 1987 had hit No. 2 for four weeks, then the airplay spread with other stations having Top 5 success with the song and by June 1987 the song had become a national hit with it reaching No. 3 on Billboard's Adult Contemporary chart.

"Nothing's Gonna Change My Love for You" went on to peak at number 12 on the Billboard Hot 100. Outside of the United States, Medeiros's version of "Nothing's Gonna Change My Love for You" topped the charts in several countries, including Canada, France, Ireland, the Netherlands, and the United Kingdom. In the latter country, "Nothing's Gonna Change My Love for You" spent four weeks at the top of the UK Singles Chart throughout July 1988 to become Britain's sixth biggest-selling song of 1988 – and second biggest-selling song of 1988 by an American artist behind "I Think We're Alone Now" by Tiffany. The song was certified Gold by the British Phonographic Industry (BPI). Medeiros released his debut album Glenn Medeiros in May 1987.

In 1988, he recorded the single "Un Roman d'amitié (Friend You Give Me a Reason)" with French artist Elsa Lunghini along with song "Love Always Finds a Reason", written by Diane Warren. "Un Roman d'amitié" achieved success in France where it debuted at No. 8 on the chart edition of 23 July 1988 and reached No. 2 two weeks later, being blocked at this position for weeks by the summer hit "Nuit de folie" by Début de Soirée; it then managed to top the chart for six weeks. "Un Roman d'amitié" was also featured in the self-titled Elsa which was certified double platinum by the SNEP for more than 600,000 sales in France.

The song was included on Medeiros's second album, Not Me, which was released in September 1988 and certified Gold in both France and Spain. The duet was also re-recorded in English as "Love Always Finds a Reason" with Ria Brieffies (of Dolly Dots); this version reached the Dutch Top 20 (No. 12). Two more singles were released to promote the album, each with a promotional music video. The first, "Long and Lasting Love", peaked at No. 68 on the Billboard Hot 100 before the album's release and the second single, "Never Get Enough of You", followed in early-1989.

In 1989 Medeiros recorded "Under Any Moon" with the Jets, along with "I Can't Help Myself" and "High Wire". All three songs were included on the soundtrack of The Karate Kid Part III, in which Medeiros briefly appeared as himself (performing at a dance club).

1990–2007: Later career and departure from the music industry

Medeiros achieved a 1990 hit duet with Bobby Brown titled "She Ain't Worth It" which was featured on his third album, Glenn Medeiros. The song reached No. 1 for two weeks on the US Billboard Hot 100, becoming Medeiros' only No. 1 hit in the United States, and the second and last No. 1 hit where Brown has received credit as an artist, after "My Prerogative". The song was certified Gold by the Recording Industry Association of America (RIAA). The single also reached the Top 20 (No. 12) on the UK Singles Chart and peaked within the Top 10 in Australia, Canada, Finland, and Ireland.

Medeiros had another hit duet with Ray Parker Jr. titled "All I'm Missing Is You" which peaked at No. 32 on the US Billboard Hot 100. In 1991, Medeiros produced "If Looks Could Kill (No Turning Back)" for the comedy film If Looks Could Kill starring Richard Grieco. In 1992, Medeiros recorded a duet with Thomas Anders (of Modern Talking) titled "Standing Alone". By the mid-1990s, Medeiros abandoned his music career and later revealed that some of the factors for doing so were the rampant drug abuse he witnessed and the fact that he was often asked for sexual favors by male figures in the music industry in return for help with his career. "Would it have led to me being more successful in my career? Potentially. But I wasn't willing to do that." By 2007, he had retired from music for good.

== Post-music career ==
Medeiros attended Leeward Community College and transferred to University of Hawaiʻi at West Oʻahu, where he received his bachelor's degree. He graduated from the University of Phoenix with a master's degree in elementary education in 2003. In 2014, Medeiros received a doctorate degree in educational leadership from the University of Southern California.

Medeiros was the vice principal of Maryknoll Grade School in Honolulu, and then its high school. He taught at various schools throughout Oahu, including Mililani Middle School, St. Joseph School in Waipahu, and Island Pacific Academy in Kapolei. On July 1, 2015, Medeiros was appointed Principal of St. Louis School, an all-boys Catholic (Marianist Order) school (K–12) in Honolulu, where he has been its CEO since 2017.

In 2022, Honolulu Civil Beat published an article questioning Medeiros' leadership, including alleged mismanagement and retaliation against staff. Nepotism, such as allowing his wife to open a nail salon at the school, was also reported. However, two members of the school's board of trustees denied that Medeiros ran a toxic workplace. They acknowledged there had been "leadership challenges" but they also said that the board had "taken steps [...] to help Medeiros – and the school at large – improve."

== Discography ==
=== Studio albums ===
List of studio albums, with selected chart positions, sales figures, and certifications
Title	Studio album details	Peak chart positions			
Title	Studio album details	US	AUS	UK	NLD
Glenn Medeiros	Released: May 1987; Label: Amherst (AMH 3313); Formats: LP, CD, cassette	83	98	—	23
Not Me	Released: September 1988; Label: Amherst (AMH 94400) / Mercury (836333.2); Formats: LP, CD, cassette	—	124	63	26
Glenn Medeiros	Released: May 1990; Label: Amherst, MCA Records (MCAD-6399); Formats: LP, CD, cassette	82	69	—	—
It's Alright to Love	Released: 1993; Label: Amherst, Mercury (514229–2); Formats: LP, CD, cassette	—	—	—	—
The Glenn Medeiros Christmas Album	Released: 1993; Label: Amherst, Mercury (518718–2); Formats: CD	—	—	—	—
Sweet Island Music	Released: 1995; Label: Amherst (AMH 4415–2); Formats: CD	—	—	—	—
Captured	Released: 1999; Label: Amherst (AMH 6600–2); Formats: CD	—	—	—	—
With Aloha	Released: 2005; Label: Glenn Medeiros; Formats: CD	—	—	—	—
"—" denotes releases that did not chart

=== Singles ===
Year	Single	Peak chart positions										Album
Year	Single	US	AUS	UK	FRA	GER	AUT	NLD	BEL	SWE	IRL	Album
1987	"Nothing's Gonna Change My Love for You"	12	10	1	1	20	12	1	2	2	1	Glenn Medeiros (1987)
1987	"Lonely Won't Leave Me Alone"	67	85	—	13	—	—	—	—	—	—	Glenn Medeiros (1987)
1987	"Watching Over You"	80	—	—	—	—	—	—	—	—	—	Glenn Medeiros (1987)
1988	"Long and Lasting Love"	68	113	42	—	54	—	14	4	—	26	Not Me
1988	"Never Get Enough of You"	—	—	—	38	—	—	—	35	—	—	Not Me
1989	"Un Roman d'amitié" (with Elsa)	—	—	—	1	—	—	—	9	—	—	Not Me
1989	"Love Always Finds a Reason" (with Ria Brieffies)	—	—	—	—	—	—	12	31	—	—	Not Me
1990	"She Ain't Worth It" (featuring Bobby Brown)	1	8	12	—	15	—	12	21	—	9	Glenn Medeiros (1990)
1990	"All I'm Missing Is You" (featuring Ray Parker Jr.)	32	101	—	—	70	—	—	—	—	—	Glenn Medeiros (1990)
1990	"Me − U = Blue" (featuring The Stylistics)	78	—	—	—	—	—	—	—	—	—	Glenn Medeiros (1990)
1992	"Standing Alone" (with Thomas Anders)	—	—	—	—	72	—	—	—	—	—	Down on Sunset
1993	"Everybody Needs Somebody to Love"	—	—	—	—	—	—	—	—	—	—	It's Alright to Love
"—" denotes releases that did not chart
