= You Are Not Alone (book) =

2012 book by Jermaine Jackson

You Are Not Alone: Michael: Through a Brother's Eyes
- Author: Jermaine Jackson
- Language: English
- Subject: Michael Jackson
- Genre: Biography
- Publisher: Touchstone Books
- Publication date: September 13, 2011
- Publication place: United States
- Media type: Book
- Pages: 480
- ISBN: 9781451651584
- OCLC: 805417635
- Dewey Decimal: 782.42166092
- LC Class: ML420.J175 J23

You Are Not Alone: Michael: Through a Brother's Eyes is a 2012 biography written by American recording artist Jermaine Jackson about his younger brother Michael. The book was first published by Touchstone on September 13, 2011. It is named after Michael's 1995 hit song.

== Content ==
In You Are Not Alone: Michael: Through a Brother's Eyes, Jermaine offers a look into Michael's personal life from a young age until his death in 2009. The book functions as both a chronological biography and a thematic defense of Michael Jackson's controversial life, divided into several key focus areas:

=== Childhood ===
Jermaine details the Jackson family's working-class roots, describing how he and Michael shared a bunk bed in a tiny two-bedroom house. He addresses their father, Joe's, strict discipline, framing it as a necessary protective mechanism against street violence and preparation for the harsh entertainment industry, rather than abuse.

=== "Peter Pan" persona ===
The memoir contextualizes Michael's eccentricities and his Neverland Ranch estate. Jermaine argues that Michael's fixation on toys, animals, and children was a psychological coping mechanism to reclaim the childhood stolen from him by early stardom.

=== 2005 trial and Bahrain escape plan ===
Jermaine confesses that during Michael's 2005 child abuse trial, the family secretly prepared an escape plan. Without Michael's knowledge, Jermaine arranged a private jet to smuggle him to Bahrain—a country with no extradition treaty with the U.S.—in the event of a guilty verdict.

=== Interventions and isolation ===
Jermaine details the family's failed attempts to stage interventions regarding Michael's dependency on prescription medication, noting how "enablers", handlers, and aggressive security teams frequently blocked the family from reaching Michael.

=== Final days ===
The closing chapters recount the events leading up to Michael's death during rehearsals for the This is It concerts, expressing the family's grief and their anger toward Conrad Murray.

== Reception ==
Upon its release, the memoir received generally positive reviews for its warm and deeply personal portrait, with critics and readers noting that it successfully humanized Michael Jackson beyond his media caricature. However, some reviewers argued that the book was overly defensive, noting that Jermaine occasionally glossed over family conflicts and legal controversies to protect the Jackson legacy.
