= Paradise in Your Eyes =

Single by Jermaine Jackson

from the album I Like Your Style
- B-side: "I'm My Brother's Keeper"
- Released: February 1982
- Recorded: 1981
- Genre: R&B
- Length: 4:24
- Label: Motown
- Songwriter: Jermaine Jackson
- Producer: Jermaine Jackson

Jermaine Jackson singles chronology
| "I'm Just Too Shy" (1981) | "Paradise in Your Eyes" (1982) | "Let Me Tickle Your Fancy" (1982) |

"Paradise in Your Eyes" is a song written and recorded by American R&B singer Jermaine Jackson. Released in February 1982, it served as the second single from his 1981 album I Like Your Style.

== Charts ==
| Chart (1982) | Peak position |
|---|---|
| U.S. Billboard Hot Black Singles | 60 |
