= Nothing's Gonna Change My Love for You =

Song by Michael Masser and Gerry Goffin

- German single release

Single by George Benson

from the album 20/20
- B-side: "Beyond the Sea (La Mer)"
- Released: 1985
- Recorded: 1984
- Genre: R&B; soul
- Length: 4:04
- Label: Warner Bros. Records
- Songwriters: Michael Masser, Gerry Goffin
- Producer: Michael Masser

George Benson singles chronology
"I Just Wanna Hang Around You" (1985)	"Nothing's Gonna Change My Love for You" (1985)	"Kisses in the Moonlight" (1986)

Music video
- "Nothing's Gonna Change My Love for You" (TopPop, 1985) on YouTube

"Nothing's Gonna Change My Love for You" is a song written by composer Michael Masser and lyricist Gerry Goffin. It was originally recorded by American singer and guitarist George Benson for his 1985 studio album 20/20, released by Warner Bros. Records. This original version was produced by co-writer Masser, and was released as a single in Europe only in 1985. In 1987, Hawaii-born singer Glenn Medeiros released a version, which became a worldwide success.

== George Benson version ==
The single release of the George Benson version contains Benson's cover version of "Beyond the Sea (La Mer)" as the B-side track. Benson's version of "Beyond the Sea" was released as a single, which peaked at number 60 on its second week in the UK Singles Chart and remained on the chart for the following two weeks. Benson's version is popular in Asia, and has received regular radio airplay in the Philippines and in Indonesia. It has also been featured on several compilation albums, of which several were compiled in Asia. It was also featured in a scene in an episode of the South Korean TV series Reply 1988, where several ladies on a bus are singing along to Benson's recording.

The music video of the Benson version shows a field where are Benson, a woman, a chauffeur, a car and an airplane. Benson and women are side by side throughout the video, and he remains connected to her by their right hands. When the song starts, Benson sings looking at the camera and looking at the woman alternately. The chauffeur who brought them appears throughout the video a little behind the two and looking for them. At the beginning and end of the video, Benson and the woman kiss.

=== Track listing ===
7-inch release

1. "Nothing's Gonna Change My Love for You" (Michael Masser, Gerry Goffin) – 4:04
2. "Beyond the Sea (La Mer)" (Charles Trenet, Jack Lawrence) – 4:10

=== Charts ===
Chart (1985)	Peak position
Belgium (Ultratop 50 Flanders)	29
Netherlands (Single Top 100)	43

=== Personnel ===
- George Benson – lead vocals and backing vocals, electric guitar solo
- Robbie Buchanan – synthesizers
- Nathan East – bass
- Carlos Vega – drums
- Richard Marx – backing vocals
- Deborah Thomas – backing vocals

== Glenn Medeiros version ==
"Nothing's Gonna Change My Love for You"
- Artwork for US releases

Single by Glenn Medeiros

from the album Glenn Medeiros
- B-side: "(Instrumental)"
- Released: 1986 (Europe), February 1987 (US)
- Recorded: 1986
- Genre: R&B,.Soul
- Length: 3:46
- Label: Amherst
- Songwriters: Michael Masser; Gerry Goffin
- Producer: Jay Stone

Glenn Medeiros singles chronology
"Nothing's Gonna Change My Love for You" (1986)	"Lonely Won't Leave Me Alone" (1987)

A 1987 version by American singer Glenn Medeiros peaked at number 12 on the Billboard Hot 100. Outside of the United States, Medeiros's version of "Nothing's Gonna Change My Love for You" topped the charts in several countries, including Canada, France, Ireland, the Netherlands, and the United Kingdom. Medeiros also recorded the song in Spanish under the title "Nada cambiará mi amor por ti". The music video features Medeiros walking along a beach with a girl in a pink dress.

=== Background and release ===
Medeiros originally released the song on a small independent label at the age of 16 in 1986, after winning Brown Bags to Stardom, a local radio talent contest at KIKI radio, in his hometown of Honolulu. Jay Stone, the program director and future producer of the song, convinced Medeiros to record it and make it his first release, as Benson's "The Greatest Love of All", another Michael Masser composition, had been a No. 1 hit for Whitney Houston earlier that year. Guy Zapoleon, program director of KZZP in Phoenix was on vacation in Honolulu where his friend Jay Stone asked him to listen to the song on KIKI. Zapoleon loved the song and took the record back to Phoenix, where it debuted on KZZP in October 1986. By January 1987, the song hit No. 2 for four weeks, then through word of mouth to other program directors, the airplay spread with other stations having top 5 success with the song and by June 1987 the song had become a national hit.

The song was featured in a late 1987 episode of the US daytime soap opera Days of Our Lives as well as 1988 episodes of As the World Turns, The Bold and the Beautiful, One Life To Live and General Hospital. It was also used in a 1989 episode of Santa Barbara. The song reached No. 1 in June 1988 in the United Kingdom and stayed at the top for four weeks. In 2009, the song was used in France in a television advert for Spontex sponges. The song was additionally used in a commercial for Thinkbox in the UK in 2015.

=== Track listings ===
- 7-inch single
1. "Nothing's Gonna Change My Love for You" (Seven Inch Version) – 3:46
2. "Nothing's Gonna Change My Love for You" (Instrumental) – 5:11
- 12-inch single
1. "Nothing's Gonna Change My Love for You" (Extended Version) – 6:09
2. "Nothing's Gonna Change My Love for You" (Seven-inch Version) – 3:46
3. "Nothing's Gonna Change My Love for You" (Instrumental Version) – 5:20

=== Charts ===
==== Weekly charts ====
Weekly chart performance for "Nothing's Gonna Change My Love for You"
Chart (1987–1989)	Peak position
Australia (Australian Music Report)	10
Austria (Ö3 Austria Top 40)	12
Belgium (Ultratop 50 Flanders)	2
Canada (The Record)	2
Canada Top Singles (RPM)	1
Canada Adult Contemporary (RPM)	3
Europe (Eurochart Hot 100 Singles)	1
France (SNEP)	1
Iceland (Íslenski listinn Topp 10)	2
Ireland (IRMA)	1
Netherlands (Dutch Top 40)	1
Netherlands (Single Top 100)	1
Norway (VG-lista)	2
Portugal (UNEVA)	2
South Africa (Springbok Radio)	2
Spain (AFYVE)	1
Sweden (Sverigetopplistan)	2
Switzerland (Schweizer Hitparade)	8
UK Singles (Official Charts)	1
US Billboard Hot 100	12
US Adult Contemporary (Billboard)	4
US Cash Box Top 100 Singles	18
West Germany (GfK)	20

==== Year-end charts ====
1987 year-end chart performance for "Nothing's Gonna Change My Love for You"
Chart (1987)	Position
Canada Top Singles (RPM)	10
US Billboard Hot 100	85
US Adult Contemporary (Billboard)	40

1988 year-end chart performance for "Nothing's Gonna Change My Love for You"
Chart (1988)	Position
Australia (ARIA)	36
Belgium (Ultratop 50 Flanders)	13
Europe (Eurochart Hot 100 Singles)	2
Netherlands (Dutch Top 40)	2
Netherlands (Single Top 100)	3
UK Singles (Gallup)	6

1989 year-end chart performance for "Nothing's Gonna Change My Love for You"
Chart (1989)	Position
South Africa (Springbok Radio)	8

=== Certifications ===
Certifications for "Nothing's Gonna Change My Love for You"
Region	Certification	Certified units/sales
Canada (Music Canada)	Gold	50,000^{^}
France (SNEP)	Gold	500,000^{*}
Netherlands (NVPI)	Gold	75,000^{^}
United Kingdom (BPI)	Gold	500,000^{^}
^{*} Sales figures based on certification alone.^{^} Shipments figures based on certification alone.

== See also ==
- List of number-one singles of 1988 (France)
