= Let's Be Young Tonight =

Single by Jermaine Jackson

from the album My Name Is Jermaine
- B-side: "Bass Odyssey"
- Released: August 5, 1976
- Recorded: 1976
- Genre: Funk
- Length: 5:50
- Label: Motown
- Songwriters: Michael Lovesmith; Don Daniels
- Producers: Michael Lovesmith; Don Daniels

Jermaine Jackson singles chronology
"You're in Good Hands" (1973)	"Let's Be Young Tonight" (1976)	"You Need to Be Loved" (1977)

"Let's Be Young Tonight" is a song by American singer Jermaine Jackson. It was released in 1976 as the lead single from his third album My Name Is Jermaine. Written by Michael Lovesmith and Don Daniels, it peaked at No. 55 on the Billboard Hot 100 and No. 19 on the Hot Soul Singles chart. It was also No. 9 in Jet Magazine's Soul Brothers Top 20 chart.

"Let's Be Young Tonight" was Jackson's first single after leaving The Jackson 5. The reason is because he stayed with the record label Motown instead of joining his brothers by moving to Epic Records.

== Charts ==
Chart (1976)	Peak position
US Billboard Hot 100	55
US Billboard Hot Soul Singles	19
US Cashbox Top 100 Singles	66
