= Word to the Badd!! =

1991 single by Jermaine Jackson

Single by Jermaine Jackson featuring TLC

from the album You Said
- Released: August 13, 1991
- Recorded: 1991
- Genre: R&B, new jack swing, dance-pop, hip hop
- Length: 5:14
- Label: LaFace; Arista
- Songwriters: L.A. Reid; Babyface; Daryl Simmons; Jermaine Jackson; Lisa "Left Eye" Lopes
- Producers: The LaFace Family (Babyface, L.A. Reid, Daryl Simmons, Kayo)

Jermaine Jackson singles chronology
"Two Ships (In the Night)" (1990)	"Word to the Badd!!" (1991)	"You Said, You Said" (1991)

TLC singles chronology
"Word to the Badd!!" (1991)	"Ain't 2 Proud 2 Beg" (1991)

"Word to the Badd!!" is a song by American musician Jermaine Jackson, taken from his thirteenth studio album You Said (1991). The song was written by Jackson, L.A. Reid, Babyface, Daryl Simmons and labelmates TLC's group member Lisa "Left Eye" Lopes. It was produced by Reid, Babyface, Simmons and Kayo. The song was released as the album's lead single on August 13, 1991, by LaFace Records and Arista Records.

It reached #78 on the Billboard Hot 100 on November 30, 1991. It also peaked at #88 on the Hot R&B/Hip-Hop Songs chart. An early appearance of TLC, the song features vocals from T-Boz, with a rap verse written by Lisa "Left Eye" Lopes thus earning her co-writing credit. The original version of the track, later edited for its album appearance, gained significant controversy for its scathing lyrics directed towards Jermaine's brother Michael. Both versions are featured on the 2014 expanded edition of You Said. There was no music video made for the song.

== Background ==
The origins of the song stem from personal and professional frustration between Jermaine Jackson and his brother, Michael. Jermaine hired the production duo L.A. Reid and Babyface for his album You Said, but production was halted when Michael secretly flew them to Los Angeles to work on his own album, Dangerous. The primary catalyst for the song was this professional slight, compounded by a growing family estrangement, as Michael had refused to return family phone calls for months.

== Charts ==
Chart (1991–92)	Peak position
U.S. Billboard Hot 100	78
U.S. Billboard Hot Black Singles	88
U.S. Billboard Radio Songs	56
