= You Said (album) =

Studio album by Jermaine Jackson
- Released: October 29, 1991
- Recorded: 1991
- Genres: R&B, New jack swing
- Labels: LaFace; Arista
- Producers: The LaFace Family (L.A. Reid, Babyface, Kayo, Daryl Simmons)

Jermaine Jackson chronology
Don't Take It Personal (1989)	You Said (1991)	I Wish You L.O.V.E (2012)

Singles from You Said
- 1. "Word to the Badd!!" Released: August 13, 1991; 2. "You Said, You Said" Released: October 6, 1991; 3. "I Dream, I Dream" Released: April 20, 1992

You Said is the thirteenth studio album by American singer-songwriter Jermaine Jackson, released on October 29, 1991, as his only album released with LaFace Records, and his last with Arista.

== Background ==
According to Jackson, he was the first major act to sign with LaFace Records. Released in 1991, the entire album was produced by "The LaFace Family", consisting of L.A. Reid, Babyface, Kayo, and Daryl Simmons. Compared to many of his previous releases, You Said was a commercial failure, failing to peak within the Billboard 200. The original version of "Word to the Badd!!" gained significant controversy for its scathing lyrics directed towards his brother Michael. Although this version was not included on the US edition of the album, both the original and re-written versions of the song were included on the international edition of the album. In 2009, all of Jackson's albums released with Arista Records were re-released on CD format, with new bonus tracks, in Japan. The re-release of You Said was based on the international edition of the album, and thus contained the original version of "Word to the Badd!!".

== Critical reception ==
Professional ratings
Review scores
Source	Rating
Allmusic	2.5/5 stars

Ed Hogan from Allmusic gave the album a mixed review, saying "at times, You Said sounds derivative of LA Reid & Babyface's previous productions". However, he did also credit it as "one of Jackson's better post-Motown albums".

== Singles ==
"Word to the Badd!" was released as the album's lead single in 1991. Although it never was fully released, it was the most successful single from the album, reaching #78 on the Billboard Hot 100, and #88 on the Hot R&B/Hip-Hop Songs. The second single from the album, "You Said, You Said", had more success on the Hot R&B charts, reaching #25. The third single, "I Dream, I Dream" reached #30 on the Hot R&B charts.

== Track listing ==
United States Edition
No.	Title	Writer(s)	Length
1.	"You Said, You Said"	Daryl Simmons; Jermaine Jackson; L.A. Reid; Babyface	5:36
2.	"Rebel (With a Cause)" (featuring TLC)	Simmons; Jackson; Kayo; Reid; Babyface	4:26
3.	"I Dream, I Dream" (Prelude)	Simmons; Reid; Babyface	0:25
4.	"I Dream, I Dream"	Simmons; Reid; Babyface	4:45
5.	"We're Making Whoopee"	Simmons; Reid; Babyface	5:09
6.	"Treat You Right" (featuring Babyface)	Simmons; Reid; Babyface	5:02
7.	"A Lovers Holiday"	Simmons, Jackson, Reid, Babyface	5:24
8.	"Secrets"	Simmons, Jackson, Reid, Babyface	4:57
9.	"True Lovers"	Simmons; Reid; Babyface	4:42
10.	"Don't You Deserve Someone"	Simmons; Reid; Babyface	5:27
11.	"Word to the Badd!!" (featuring TLC)	Simmons; Jackson; Reid; Babyface; Lisa "Left Eye" Lopes	5:16
12.	"You Said, You Said" (Extended Remix)	Simmons; Reid; Babyface	7:02

International Edition
No.	Title	Writer(s)	Length
1.	"You Said, You Said"	Simmons; Jackson; Reid; Babyface	5:36
2.	"Rebel (With a Cause)"	Simmons; Jackson; Kayo; Reid; Babyface	4:26
3.	"I Dream, I Dream" (Prelude)	Simmons; Reid; Babyface	0:25
4.	"I Dream, I Dream"	Simmons; Reid; Babyface	4:45
5.	"We're Making Whoopee"	Simmons; Reid; Babyface	5:09
6.	"Treat You Right" (featuring Babyface)	Simmons; Reid; Babyface	5:02
7.	"Word to the Badd!!" (Prelude)	Simmons; Jackson; Reid; Babyface; Lopes	1:09
8.	"Word to the Badd!! (Original version)"	Simmons; Jackson; Reid; Babyface; Lopes	5:14
9.	"A Lovers Holiday"	Simmons; Jackson; Reid; Babyface	5:24
10.	"Secrets"	Simmons; Jackson; Reid; Babyface	4:57
11.	"True Lovers"	Simmons; Reid; Babyface	4:42
12.	"Don't You Deserve Someone"	Simmons; Reid; Babyface	5:27
13.	"Word to the Badd!!"	Simmons; Jackson; Reid; Babyface; Lopes	5:16
14.	"You Said, You Said" (Extended Remix)	Simmons; Jackson; Reid; Babyface	7:02

Japanese re-release
No.	Title	Writer(s)	Length
15.	"I Dream, I Dream" (Remix Extended Version)	Simmons; Reid; Babyface	6:59

== Charts ==
Chart (1991)	Peak position
US Top R&B/Hip-Hop Albums (Billboard)	39
