= You Like Me Don't You =

Single by Jermaine Jackson

from the album Jermaine
- B-side: "You Like Me Don't You" (instrumental)
- Released: January 1981
- Recorded: 1980
- Genre: R&B
- Length: 5:00
- Label: Motown
- Songwriter: Jermaine Jackson
- Producer: Jermaine Jackson

Jermaine Jackson singles chronology
"Little Girl Don't You Worry" (1980)	"You Like Me Don't You" (1981)	"I'm Just Too Shy" (1981)

"You Like Me Don't You" is a song written and recorded by American R&B singer Jermaine Jackson. It was released as the second single from his 1980 album, Jermaine, in January 1981.

Record World said that "Jermaine exhibits a sense of maturity and confidence that make this a totally engrossing piece."

== Charts ==
Chart (1981)	Peak position
U.S. Billboard Hot 100	50
U.S. Billboard Hot Black Singles	13
