= Very Special Part =

Single by Jermaine Jackson

from the album Let Me Tickle Your Fancy
- B-side: "You're Givin' Me The Runaround"
- Released: October 1982
- Recorded: 1982
- Genre: R&B
- Length: 5:42
- Label: Motown
- Songwriters: Benny Medina, Cliff Liles, Kerry Gordy, William E. Bickelhaupt
- Producers: Jermaine Jackson, Berry Gordy

Jermaine Jackson singles chronology
| "Let Me Tickle Your Fancy" (1982) | "Very Special Part" (1982) | "Dynamite" (1984) |

"Very Special Part" is a song recorded by American R&B singer Jermaine Jackson and produced by Jackson with Berry Gordy. It was released as the second single from his 1982 album, Let Me Tickle Your Fancy, and his final single to be released on Motown.

== Charts ==
| Chart (1982–83) | Peak position |
|---|---|
| U.S. Billboard Hot Black Singles | 54 |
