= Castles of Sand =

1978 song by Jermaine Jackson

Single by Jermaine Jackson

from the album Frontiers
- B-side: "I Love Every Little Thing About You"
- Released: March 1978
- Recorded: 1977
- Genre: Soul
- Length: 3:37
- Label: Motown
- Songwriter: Michael McGloiry
- Producers: Jermaine Jackson, Michael McGloiry

Jermaine Jackson singles chronology
"You Need to Be Loved" (1977)	"Castles of Sand" (1978)	"Let's Get Serious" (1980)

"Castles of Sand" is a song recorded by American R&B singer Jermaine Jackson. It was released as the first and only single from his 1978 album, Frontiers, in March of that year.

The song was heavily sampled in the song "Somehow, Someway" by Jay-Z off his album, The Blueprint 2 (2002), which featured fellow rappers Scarface and Beanie Sigel produced by Just Blaze.

== Charts ==
Chart (1978)	Peak position
U.S. Billboard Hot Black Singles	38
