= Come into My Life (Jermaine Jackson album) =

Studio album by Jermaine Jackson
- Released: May 1973
- Recorded: 1972–1973
- Genre: Funk; soul
- Label: Motown
- Producer: The Corporation; Hal Davis; Fonce Mizell & Freddie Perren; Clay McMurray; Gloria Jones; Pam Sawyer; Jerry Marcellino; Mel Larson

Jermaine Jackson chronology
Jermaine (1972)	Come into My Life (1973)	My Name Is Jermaine (1976)

Professional ratings
Review scores
Source	Rating
AllMusic	3/5 stars

Come into My Life is the second solo album from Jermaine Jackson. Released in 1973, Come Into My Life charted during the summer of 1973, hitting #30 on R&B and #152 on the pop charts.

The album was arranged by Greg Poree, Fonce Mizell, Freddie Perren, H. B. Barnum, David Van De Pitte, David Blumberg, James Anthony Carmichael and The Corporation. The cover photography was by Jim Britt with Berry Gordy being the executive producer.

== Track listing ==
Side A

1. "Sitting on the Edge of My Mind" (Charlotte O'Hara, Donald Fletcher, Nita Garfield) - 4:12
2. "You're in Good Hands" (Fonce Mizell, Larry Mizell) - 3:17
3. "I Need You More Now Than Ever" (Clay McMurray, Marty Coleman, Richard Drapkin) - 4:06
4. "If You Don't Love Me" (Pat Livingston, Rich Cason) - 2:45
5. "A Million to One" (Phil Medley) - 2:35

Side B

1. "The Bigger You Love (The Harder You Fall)" (Jerry Marcellino, Mel Larson) - 3:25
2. "Does Your Mama Know About Me" (Thomas Chong, Tom Baird) - 3:09
3. "Come into My Life" (Marcellino, Larson, Ron Rancifer) - 2:53
4. "So in Love" (Earl Moss) - 3:38
5. "Ma" (Norman Whitfield) - 4:30

== Charts ==
Chart (1973)	Peak position
Billboard 200	152
Top R&B Albums	30

=== Singles ===
Year	Single	Chart positions	
Year	Single	US	US R&B
1973	"You're In Good Hands"	79	35
