= Frontiers (Jermaine Jackson album) =

Studio album by Jermaine Jackson
- Released: February 8, 1978
- Recorded: 1977
- Studio: Motown Recording Studios (Hollywood, California)
- Genre: Funk, soul
- Label: Motown
- Producer: Jermaine Jackson, Michael McGloiry, Hal Davis, Brian Holland

Jermaine Jackson chronology
Feel the Fire (1977)	Frontiers (1978)	Let's Get Serious (1980)

Singles from Frontiers
- 1. "Castles of Sand" Released: March 1978

Professional ratings
Review scores
Source	Rating
AllMusic	1/5 stars

Frontiers is the fifth solo album by Jermaine Jackson, and the third post-Jackson 5 solo album released in 1978. It is Jackson's worst-selling album, despite having a minor hit with the song "Castles of Sand". Like Feel the Fire before it, it also features the Tower of Power horn section. It also features the group Switch, who Jackson had helped get signed with Motown. The arrangements are by Greg Adams, Don Peake, Paul Riser, McKinley Jackson, Gene Page and H.B. Barnum. Sam Emerson was responsible for the cover photography.

The cover notes, "This album is dedicated to my daughter to be, Autumn".

== Track listing ==
Side A

1. "Let It Ride" (Jermaine Jackson, Michael McGloiry, Gregory Williams) - 4:00
2. "The Force" (Jackson, McGloiry) - 4:23
3. "Take a Trip to My Tomorrow (Let's Encounter for the First Time)" (Brian Holland, Marcia Woods, Eddie Holland, Jr.) - 4:12
4. "Je Vous Aime Beaucoup (I Love You)" (Jackson, Maureen Bailey) - 4:00

Side B

1. "You Gave Me Something to Believe In" (Holland, Woods, Holland, Jr.) - 2:28
2. "I Love Every Little Thing About You" (Sandra Crouch) - 2:53
3. "Isn't She Lovely" (Stevie Wonder) - 3:30
4. "Castles of Sand" (McGloiry) - 5:29

== Charts ==
=== Singles ===
Year	Single	Chart positions
Year	Single	US R&B
1978	"Castles of Sand"	38
