= Let's Get Serious (Jermaine Jackson album) =

Studio album by Jermaine Jackson
- Released: March 17, 1980
- Recorded: 1979
- Studios: Motown Recording Studios (Hollywood, California); Crystal Sound and Whitney Recording Studios (Los Angeles, California); Kendun Recorders (Burbank, California)
- Genres: Funk; soul; R&B
- Length: 42:32
- Label: Motown
- Producers: Stevie Wonder; Jermaine Jackson

Jermaine Jackson chronology
Frontiers (1978)	Let's Get Serious (1980)	Jermaine (1980)

Singles from Let's Get Serious
- 1. "Let's Get Serious" Released: March 1980; 2. "You're Supposed to Keep Your Love for Me" Released: June 1980

Let's Get Serious is the sixth studio album by Jermaine Jackson, released in 1980. It reached #6 on the Billboard album chart and logged five weeks at No. 1 on the Top R&B chart. It achieved sales of 900,000 copies in the United States and it sold 2 million copies worldwide.

The title track was 1980's biggest soul hit of the year and a top ten pop hit as well. This is the most successful album of Jackson's career. The song hit #9 on the UK Singles Chart in June 1980.

== Background ==
After splitting with his brothers, The Jacksons, in 1975, Jermaine recorded and released three solo albums between 1976 and 1978 that fared poorly. Needing a success, he enlisted the aid of family friend and labelmate Stevie Wonder, who wrote and produced three songs, including the title track and first single, "Let's Get Serious". Jackson would oversee the other tracks on the album. This formula worked, as Jackson finally scored a hit with both the album and single.

It was one of the featured titles in a major Motown 20th Anniversary television, radio and print campaign. This gave the album prominent advertising benefits throughout the entire year.

== Critical reception ==
Professional ratings
Review scores
Source	Rating
AllMusic	4.5/5 stars
The Rolling Stone Album Guide	3/5 stars
Smash Hits	7½/10

AllMusic critic John Lowe stated, "The best of his Motown albums features Stevie Wonder's brilliant songs and production. For once Jermaine sounded inspired, and that feeling is sustained throughtout [sic]. One of the high points in his career, and the effort was worth it."

== Track listing ==
Side A
No.	Title	Writer(s)	Length
1.	"Let's Get Serious"	Lee Garrett, Stevie Wonder	8:05
2.	"Where Are You Now"	Renee Hardaway, Stevie Wonder	3:49
3.	"You Got to Hurry Girl"	Jermaine Jackson, Maureen Bailey, Paul M. Jackson, Jr.	4:15
4.	"We Can Put It Back Together"	Hazel G. Jackson, Jermaine Jackson, Maureen Bailey	5:08

Side B
No.	Title	Writer(s)	Length
1.	"Burnin' Hot"	Jermaine Jackson, Jim Foelber, Phyllis Molinary	7:50
2.	"You're Supposed to Keep Your Love for Me"	Stevie Wonder	5:34
3.	"Feelin' Free"	Hazel G. Jackson, Jermaine Jackson, Maureen Bailey	7:59

== Personnel ==
Musicians and Vocalists

- Jermaine Jackson – lead vocals, backing vocals, keyboards (3–5, 7), bass (3–5, 7), percussion (3–5, 7)
- Stevie Wonder – Fender Rhodes (1, 2, 6), acoustic piano (1, 2, 6), synthesizers (1, 2, 6), celesta (1, 2, 6), guitars (1, 2, 6), drums (1, 2, 6), backing vocals (1, 2, 6)
- Isaiah Sanders – clavinet (1, 2, 6)
- Kevin Bassinson – keyboards (3–5, 7)
- Greg Phillinganes – keyboards (3–5, 7)
- Joe Sample – keyboards (3–5, 7)
- Gary S. Scott – synth bass (3–5, 7)
- Ben Bridges – guitars (1, 2, 6)
- Rick Zunigar – guitars (1, 2, 6)
- Paul Jackson, Jr. – guitars (3–5, 7), percussion (3–5, 7)
- Tim May – guitars (3–5, 7)
- Nathan Watts – bass guitar (1, 2, 6)
- Scott Edwards – bass guitar (3–5, 7)
- Eddie N. Watkins, Jr. – bass guitar (3–5, 7)
- Dennis Davis – drums (1, 2, 6)
- Ollie E. Brown – drums (3–5, 7)
- Ed Greene – drums (3–5, 7)
- Earl DeRouen – congas (1, 2, 6)
- Gary Coleman – percussion (3–5, 7)
- Gene Estes – percussion (3–5, 7)
- Emil Richards – percussion (3–5, 7)
- Larry Gittens – trumpet (1, 2, 6)
- Alexandra Brown – backing vocals (1, 2, 6)
- Marva Holcolm – backing vocals (1, 2, 6)
- Angela Winbush – backing vocals (1, 2, 6)
- T.K. Carter – backing vocals (3–5)
- Carolyn Cook – backing vocals (3–5)
- Suzee Ikeda – backing vocals (3–5)
- Hazel G. Jackson – backing vocals (3, 5)
- Tina Madison – backing vocals (3, 4)
- Danny Smith – backing vocals (3–5)

Finger snaps and Handclaps (Tracks 1, 2 & 6)

- Earl DeRouen, Keith Harris, Jermaine Jackson (finger snaps), Dick Rudolph, Abdoulaye Soumare, Nathan Watts and Stevie Wonder (finger snaps)

Music arrangements

- Stevie Wonder – arrangements (1, 2, 6)
- Jermaine Jackson – horn, rhythm and string arrangements (3–5, 7)
- Paul Jackson, Jr. – rhythm arrangements (3)
- Don Peake – horn and string arrangements (3–5, 7), rhythm arrangements (4, 5, 7)

== Production ==
- Berry Gordy, Jr. – executive producer
- Hazel G. Jackson – executive producer
- Stevie Wonder – producer (1, 2, 6)
- Jermaine Jackson – producer (3–5, 7)
- Jane Clark – engineer
- Bob Harlan – engineer
- Cal Harris – engineer
- Frank Kramer – engineer
- Steve Miller – engineer
- John Mills – engineer
- Gary Olazabal – engineer
- Ginny Pallante – engineer
- Bob Robitaille – engineer
- Abdoulaye Soumare – engineer
- Russ Terrana – engineer
- Suzee Ikeda – album coordinator
- John Cabalka – art direction
- Ginny Livingston – design
- Claude Mougin – photography

== Trivia ==
The track "You're Supposed to Keep Your Love for Me" was originally recorded in 1975, possibly for the aborted Do Unto Others album, and featured Stevie Wonder, Michael Jackson and Jackie Jackson on background vocals. But when Jermaine's brothers left for Epic Records, this original version was shelved. Four years later, Stevie dug it out and remixed/overdubbed the track for Let's Get Serious and removed Michael and Jackie's vocals.

== Charts ==
=== Weekly charts ===
Chart (1980)	Peak position
Australian Albums (Kent Music Report)	78
US Billboard 200	6
US Top R&B/Hip-Hop Albums (Billboard)	1

=== Year-end charts ===
Chart (1980)	Position
US Billboard 200	42
US Top R&B/Hip-Hop Albums (Billboard)	5

=== Singles ===
Year	Single	Chart positions		
Year	Single	US	US R&B	US Dance
1980	"Let's Get Serious"	9	1	2
1980	"You're Supposed to Keep Your Love for Me"	34	32	—

== Certifications ==
Region	Certification	Certified units/sales
United States (RIAA)	Gold	900,000^{^}
Summaries
Worldwide	—	2,000,000
^{*} Sales figures based on certification alone.^{^} Shipments figures based on certification alone.
