= Let's Get Serious (song) =

1980 single by Jermaine Jackson

Single by Jermaine Jackson

from the album Let's Get Serious
- B-side: "Je Vous Aime Beaucoup (I Love You)"
- Released: March 7, 1980
- Recorded: 1979
- Genre: Disco; funk; R&B
- Length: 8:05 (album version); 3:33 (single version)
- Label: Motown
- Songwriters: Lee Garrett; Stevie Wonder
- Producer: Stevie Wonder

Jermaine Jackson singles chronology
"Castles of Sand" (1978)	"Let's Get Serious" (1980)	"You're Supposed to Keep Your Love for Me" (1980)

"Let's Get Serious" is a song written by Lee Garrett and Stevie Wonder and the title track to Jermaine Jackson's 1980 Motown album of the same name. Released as a single, it became Jackson's first number-one R&B hit and second top-ten pop hit. It also reached the top ten in the UK. The recording was produced by Stevie Wonder, who also provided vocals for the track.

It was ranked number one on the Billboard soul chart for the year in 1980, edging out brother Michael's Platinum-certified mega-hit "Rock with You", which ranked at number two.

The Spanish version is titled "Seamos Serios" with the translation of the lyrics by Jose Silva and is the only song Jackson recorded in Spanish.

== Background and production ==
Following the Jackson 5's departure from Motown Records for Epic Records in the mid-1970s, Jermaine Jackson chose to remain with Motown due to his marriage to Hazel Gordy, daughter of company founder Berry Gordy. However, his initial solo albums struggled to achieve major commercial success. In an effort to revitalize Jermaine's career, Berry Gordy personally intervened and asked family friend Stevie Wonder to write and produce a hit song for him.

Wonder co-wrote "Let's Get Serious" with Lee Garrett and took full charge of the production and arrangement. Beyond his role as a producer, Wonder played multiple instruments on the track, including drums, acoustic piano, electric guitar, and synthesizers. He also provided prominent background vocals throughout the song, heavily embedding his signature musical style into the track.

== Composition ==
Musically, "Let's Get Serious" is a high-energy track that blends elements of late-era disco, funk, and traditional R&B. The song is driven by a prominent, rhythmic bassline and sharp brass arrangements. The track was released in multiple formats. The original album version features an extended, dance-floor-friendly arrangement running 8:05, while the commercial single version was edited down to 3:33 for radio airplay. Additionally, Jackson recorded a unique Spanish-language version of the song titled "Seamos Serios," featuring lyrics translated by Jose Silva. It remains the only track Jackson ever recorded in Spanish.

== Reception ==
"Let's Get Serious" was named the number-one Billboard Year-End R&B single of 1980, famously beating out his brother Michael's mega-hit "Rock with You" for the top spot. The song's critical and commercial success also earned Jermaine Jackson a Grammy Award nomination for Best Male R&B Vocal Performance at the 23rd Annual Grammy Awards in 1981, marking the sole solo Grammy nomination of his career.

== Charts ==
=== Weekly charts ===
Weekly chart performance for "Let's Get Serious"
Chart (1980–1981)	Peak position
Australia (Kent Music Report)	24
US Billboard Hot 100	9
US Billboard Hot Black Singles	1
US Billboard Hot Dance Club Play	2

=== Year-end charts ===
Year-end chart performance for "Let's Get Serious"
Chart (1980)	Rank
US Top Pop Singles (Billboard)	30
