= Let Me Tickle Your Fancy (song) =

Single by Jermaine Jackson

from the album Let Me Tickle Your Fancy
- B-side: "Maybe Next Time"
- Released: July 1982
- Recorded: 1982
- Length: 3:50
- Label: Motown
- Songwriters: Jermaine Jackson, Paul Jackson Jr., Pam Sawyer, Marilyn McLeod
- Producers: Jermaine Jackson, Berry Gordy

Jermaine Jackson singles chronology
"Paradise In Your Eyes" (1982)	"Let Me Tickle Your Fancy" (1982)	"Very Special Part" (1982)

"Let Me Tickle Your Fancy" is a song recorded by American R&B singer Jermaine Jackson. It was released as the first single from his 1982 album, Let Me Tickle Your Fancy. It features the group Devo.

== Charts ==
Chart (1982–83)	Peak position
U.S. Billboard Hot 100	18
U.S. Billboard Hot Black Singles	5
U.S. Billboard Hot Dance Club Play	24
