= Let Me Tickle Your Fancy =

Studio album by Jermaine Jackson
- Released: July 9, 1982
- Studios: Yamaha Research & Development Studio (Glendale, California); The Village Recorder (Los Angeles, California)
- Genres: Funk, soul
- Length: 45:29
- Label: Motown
- Producers: Berry Gordy; Jermaine Jackson

Jermaine Jackson chronology
I Like Your Style (1981)	Let Me Tickle Your Fancy (1982)	Dynamite (1984)

Singles from Let Me Tickle Your Fancy
- 1. "Let Me Tickle Your Fancy" Released: 1982; 2. "Very Special Part" Released: 1982

Professional ratings
Review scores
Source	Rating
AllMusic	3/5 stars

Let Me Tickle Your Fancy is the ninth studio album by Jermaine Jackson, released in 1982. It was his final album for Motown Records. It reached No. 46 on the Billboard Top LPs chart and No. 9 on the Top R&B LPs chart. The title track peaked at No. 5 on the soul singles chart.

== Track listing ==
Side one
No.	Title	Writer(s)	Length
1.	"Let Me Tickle Your Fancy" (featuring Devo)	Jermaine Jackson, Paul M. Jackson, Jr., Pam Sawyer, Marilyn McLeod	3:50
2.	"Very Special Part"	Benny Medina, Cliff Liles, Kerry Ashby, William Bickelhaupt	6:32
3.	"Uh, Uh, I Didn't Do It"	Denzil Miller, Jackson, Monica Pége	4:29
4.	"You Belong to Me" (duet with Syreeta)	Carlton Dinnall, Denzil Miller, Jackson	4:02
5.	"You Moved a Mountain"	Denzil Miller, Jackson, Ron Miller	4:22

Side two
No.	Title	Writer(s)	Length
1.	"Running"	Denzil Miller, Jackson, Kathy Wakefield	4:16
2.	"Messing Around"	Jackson	4:28
3.	"This Time"	Jackson, John McClain, Kathy Wakefield	4:17
4.	"There's a Better Way"	Jackson	4:12
5.	"I Like Your Style"	Elliot Willensky, Jackson	5:01

== Personnel ==
- Jermaine Jackson – vocals, backing vocals, keyboards, synthesizers, synth bass, bass guitar, drums, percussion, congas
- Ronnie Foster – keyboards
- Denzil Miller – keyboards, synth bass
- Paul Jackson, Jr. – guitars, bass guitar
- Nathan East – bass guitar
- Tal Hawkins – bass guitar
- Ollie E. Brown – drums
- James Gadson – drums
- Jonathan Moffett – drums
- Arnold Ramsey – drums
- Karen Jackson – percussion
- Randy Jackson – percussion
- Godfrey Watson – percussion
- Monica Pege – additional backing vocals (1)
- Spud and Pud Devo – additional backing vocals (1)
- Syreeta Wright – vocals (4)
- Adonis Hampton – additional backing vocals
- Marti McCall – additional backing vocals
- Gonzales Ozen – additional backing vocals
- Stephanie Spruill – additional backing vocals

Arrangements

- Jermaine Jackson – rhythm arrangements (1–7, 9, 10), horn arrangements (2, 6–8)
- Paul Jackson, Jr. – rhythm arrangements (2, 3)
- Benjamin Wright – horn arrangements (2)
- Jerry Hey – horn arrangements (3, 6, 7)
- Denzil Miller – rhythm arrangements (4, 5, 6)
- Gene Page – string arrangements (4, 5)
- John McClain – rhythm arrangements (8), horn arrangements (8)
- George Del Barrio – string arrangements (10)

== Production ==
- Hazel Jackson – executive producer
- Berry Gordy – executive producer, producer
- Jermaine Jackson – producer
- Michael Schuman – recording, mixing
- Mick Guzauski – assistant engineer
- Bob Harlan – assistant engineer
- Robin Laine – assistant engineer
- Keith Seppanen – assistant engineer
- John Matousek – mastering at Hitsville U.S.A. (Los Angeles, California)
- Johnny Lee – art direction, design
- Ron Slenzak – photography
