= I Wish You L.O.V.E =

Studio album by Jermaine Jackson
- Released: October 4, 2012
- Recorded: 2012
- Genres: Jazz, pop
- Length: 25:09
- Label: Disques DOM
- Producer: David Serero

Jermaine Jackson chronology
You Said (1991)	I Wish You L.O.V.E (2012)

I Wish You L.O.V.E is the fourteenth studio album by American singer Jermaine Jackson featuring David Serero. The album was released in 2012 by Disques DOM, and was his first album since You Said in 1991.

== Track listing ==
No.	Title	Length
1.	"I've Got the World on a String"	2:12
2.	"I've Got You Under My Skin"	3:41
3.	"I Wish You Love"	2:56
4.	"Autumn Leaves (Les Feuilles Mortes) (duet with David Serero)"	2:45
5.	"Can't Take My Eyes Off You"	3:21
6.	"But Not for Me"	2:33
7.	"My Funny Valentine"	3:47
8.	"Almost Like Being in Love"	1:41
9.	"All the Things You Are"	2:53

== Personnel ==
Credits adapted from AllMusic.

- Jermaine Jackson - Primary Artist
- David Serero - Arranger, Artistic Director, Duet, Producer
