= Jermaine (1980 album) =

Studio album by Jermaine Jackson
- Released: October 10, 1980
- Recorded: 1980
- Studio: Kendun Recorders (Burbank, California); Whitney Sound and Motown/Hitsville U.S.A. Recording Studio (Los Angeles, California)
- Genre: Funk, soul
- Length: 42:32
- Label: Motown
- Producer: Jermaine Jackson Berry Gordy Suzee Ikeda

Jermaine Jackson chronology
Let's Get Serious (1980)	Jermaine (1980)	I Like Your Style (1981)

Singles from Jermaine
- 1. "Little Girl Don't You Worry" Released: October 1980; 2. "You Like Me Don't You" Released: January 1981

Jermaine is the seventh studio album by Jermaine Jackson, his second album in 1980. Fresh off the success of Let's Get Serious, Motown released this album in Fall 1980. Charting on the R&B albums chart at 17 with two singles ("You Like Me Don't You" and "Little Girl Don't You Worry") charting top 20 on the R&B singles chart, respectively. Also included is a cover of Tyrone Davis's "Can I Change My Mind". Also included as a musician on this album is family friend John McClain, who would later become one of the executives of the estate of Jermaine's brother, Michael Jackson.

== Track listing ==
Side A

1. "The Pieces Fit" (Jermaine Jackson, Paul Jackson, Jr., Angelo Bond) - 5:22
2. "You Like Me Don't You" (Jermaine Jackson) - 5:00
3. "Little Girl Don't You Worry" (Jermaine Jackson, Paul Jackson, Jr.) - 4:48
4. "All Because of You" (Jermaine Jackson, Angelo Bond) - 4:43
5. "You've Changed (Interlude)" (Jermaine Jackson) - 1:52

Side B

1. "First You Laugh, Then You Cry" (Jermaine Jackson, Chris Clark) - 4:52
2. "I Miss You So" (Jimmie Henderson, Bertha Scott, Sid Robin) - 2:46
3. "Can I Change My Mind" (Barry Despenza, Carl Wolfolk) - 3:30
4. "Beautiful Morning" (Jermaine Jackson, Hazel G. Jackson, Eddie Fluellen) - 5:14

== Personnel ==
- Jermaine Jackson – all vocals (1–8), acoustic piano (1–6, 9), Fender Rhodes (1–6, 9), guitars (1–6, 9), bass, percussion (1–6, 9), lead vocals (9), backing vocals (9)
- Herbie Hancock – synthesizers (1–6, 9)
- David Benoit – keyboards (1–6, 9)
- Clarence McDonald – keyboards (1–6, 9)
- Reginald "Sonny" Burke – keyboards (7, 8)
- Michael Lang – keyboards (7, 8)
- Eddie Fluellen – keyboards (9)
- Paul Jackson, Jr. – guitars
- Charles Fearing – guitars (7, 8)
- John McClain – sitar (1–6, 9)
- David Williams – bass (1–6, 9)
- Nathan East – bass (7, 8)
- Ollie E. Brown – drums, percussion (1–6, 9)
- Gregory Williams – flugelhorn (9)
- Stevie Wonder – harmonica (2, 7) (uncredited)
- Phillip Ingram – backing vocals (9)

Music arrangements

- Jerry Hey – horn arrangements (1, 3), string arrangements (1)
- Jermaine Jackson – horn arrangements (1, 3, 5), rhythm arrangements (1), string arrangements (1, 2, 4, 6)
- Paul Jackson, Jr. – rhythm arrangements (1)
- Gene Page – string arrangements (2, 5, 7, 8), horn and rhythm arrangements (7, 8)
- Don Peake – horn arrangements (5), string arrangements (5, 6)
- Clare Fischer – horn and string arrangements (9)

== Production ==
- Hazel G. Jackson – executive producer
- Berry Gordy – executive producer, producer (7, 8)
- Jermaine Jackson – producer (1–6, 9)
- Suzee Ikeda – producer (7, 8)
- Johnny Lee – art direction
- Ginny Livingston – cover design
- Matthew Rolston – photography
- John Hayles – wardrobe
- Derek O. Ashby – hair stylist

Technical credits

- Bernie Grundman – mastering at A&M Studios (Hollywood, California)
- Jane Clark – recording (1–6, 9), mixing (1–6, 9)
- Craig Huntley – recording (1–6, 9), mixing (1–6, 9)
- Michael Schuman – recording (1–6, 9), mixing (1–6, 9)
- Russ Terrana – recording (1–6, 9), mixing (1–6, 9)
- Guy Costa – recording (7, 8), mixing (7, 8)
- Tony Autore – assistant engineer (1–6, 9)
- Fred Law – assistant engineer (1–6, 9)
- Harold "Lanky" Linstrot – assistant engineer (1–6, 9)
- Kevin W. Smith – assistant engineer (1–6, 9), demo recording (7, 8)
- Bob Winard – assistant engineer (1–6, 9)
- Gail Ritter – assistant engineer (7, 8)

== Charts ==
Year	Album	Chart positions	
Year	Album	US	US R&B
1981	Jermaine	44	17

=== Singles ===
Year	Single	Chart positions	
Year	Single	US	US R&B
1981	"You Like Me Don't You"	50	13
1981	"Little Girl (Don't You Worry) "	—	17
