= Feel the Fire (Jermaine Jackson album) =

Studio album by Jermaine Jackson
- Released: June 29, 1977
- Recorded: 1977
- Studio: Motown Recording Studios (Hollywood, California)
- Genre: Funk, soul
- Label: Motown
- Producer: Jermaine Jackson, Michael McGloiry, Greg Wright, Michael L. Smith

Jermaine Jackson chronology
My Name Is Jermaine (1976)	Feel the Fire (1977)	Frontiers (1978)

Professional ratings
Review scores
Source	Rating
AllMusic	2/5 stars
The Encyclopedia of Popular Music	2/5 stars
The New Rolling Stone Record Guide	2/5 stars

Feel the Fire is the fourth solo album by Jermaine Jackson, and his second post-Jackson 5 solo album. It was dedicated: "to Jai, born January 27, 1977".

== Production ==
Feel the Fire is the first album for which Jackson did some producing and writing for himself. The album includes Tower of Power's horn section, and Stevie Wonder's ex-wife Syreeta. Its only single release was the Earth, Wind & Fire-inspired "You Need To Be Loved", which has a saxophone solo by Lenny Pickett.

== Track listing ==
Side A

1. "Feel the Fire (Burning from Me to You)" (Jermaine Jackson, Michael McGloiry, Kathy Wakefield) - 4:34
2. "You Need to Be Loved" (Jackson, McGloiry, Wakefield) - 5:50
3. "Strong Love" (Greg Wright, Syreeta Wright) - 3:14
4. "Git Up and Dance" (Jackson, McGloiry) - 3:15

Side B

1. "I Love You More" (McGloiry) - 3:34
2. "Happiness Is" (G. Wright, Karin Patterson) - 4:20
3. "Some Kind of Woman" (Michael L. Smith, Eddie Holland, Jr., Brian Holland) - 4:10
4. "Got to Get to You Girl" (Jackson) - 3:26
5. "Take Time" (McGloiry) - 3:50
- Executive producer: Berry Gordy
- Arrangers: Greg Adams, Greg Wright, Clay Drayton, Don Peake, Benjamin Wright, Gil Askey, H.B. Barnum, Greg Poree

== Charts ==
Year	Album	Chart positions	
Year	Album	US	US R&B
1977	Feel the Fire	174	36

=== Singles ===
Year	Single	Chart positions
Year	Single	US R&B
1977	"You Need to Be Loved"	75
