= You're Supposed to Keep Your Love for Me =

Single by Jermaine Jackson

from the album Let's Get Serious
- B-side: "Let It Ride"
- Released: June 17, 1980
- Recorded: 1979
- Genre: R&B
- Length: 5:34 (album); 3:52 (single)
- Label: Motown
- Songwriter: Stevie Wonder
- Producer: Stevie Wonder

Jermaine Jackson singles chronology
"Let's Get Serious" (1980)	"You're Supposed to Keep Your Love for Me" (1980)	"Little Girl Don't You Worry" (1980)

"You're Supposed to Keep Your Love for Me" is a song written by Stevie Wonder and recorded by American R&B singer Jermaine Jackson. It was released as the second single from Jackson's 1980 album, Let's Get Serious.

Record World said that "Jackson's reading is dreamy."

== Charts ==
Chart (1980–81)	Peak position
U.S. Billboard Hot 100	34
U.S. Billboard Hot Black Singles	32
