= You're in Good Hands =

Single by Jermaine Jackson

from the album Come into My Life
- B-side: "Does Your Mama Know About Me"
- Released: September 11, 1973
- Recorded: 1972
- Genre: Soul
- Length: 3:17
- Label: Motown
- Songwriters: Larry Mizell; Fonce Mizell
- Producers: Fonce Mizell; Freddie Perren

Jermaine Jackson singles chronology
"Daddy's Home" (1972)	"You're in Good Hands" (1973)	"Let's Be Young Tonight" (1976)

"You're in Good Hands" is a song by American singer Jermaine Jackson. It was released as the lead single from his second album Come into My Life. It was written by Larry and Fonce Mizell and produced by Fonce Mizell and Freddie Perren. The single peaked at No. 79 on the Billboard Hot 100 and stayed at the chart five weeks, the only track on the album to chart. It peaked at No. 35 on the Hot Soul Singles chart. It was one of Jackson's earliest hits throughout his career.

== Charts ==
Chart (1973)	Peak position
US Billboard Hot 100	79
US Billboard Hot Soul Singles	35
US Cashbox Top 100 Singles	89
