= Do You Remember Me? (song) =

Single by Jermaine Jackson

from the album Precious Moments
- B-side: "Whatcha Doin'"
- Released: June 1986
- Recorded: 1985
- Genre: Disco
- Length: 5:03 (album version); 3:41 (single version)
- Label: Arista
- Songwriters: Jermaine Jackson; Michael Omartian; Bruce Sudano
- Producer: Michael Omartian

Jermaine Jackson singles chronology
"Lonely Won't Leave Me Alone" (1986)	"Do You Remember Me?" (1986)	"Words Into Action" (1986)

"Do You Remember Me?" is a song by Jermaine Jackson from his album Precious Moments. It is written by Jackson, Bruce Sudano, and the song's producer Michael Omartian. "Do You Remember Me" peaked at No. 71 on the Billboard Hot 100 in July 1986. It peaked at No. 40 on the Hot Black Singles chart. "Do You Remember Me?" features a B-side titled "Whatcha Doin'", which isn't part of any album.

== Track listing ==
1. "Do You Remember Me?" - 3:41
2. "Whatcha Doin'" - 5:30

== Personnel ==
- Jermaine Jackson – lead vocals, backing vocals
- Michael Omartian – keyboards, synthesizers, DX7 bass, Moog Source bass, drum programming, arrangements
- Marcus Ryle – synthesizer programming
- Michael Landau – electric guitar
- Paulinho da Costa – percussion
- Gary Herbig – saxophones
- Kim Hutchcroft – saxophones
- Chuck Findley – trombone
- Gary Grant – trumpet
- Jerry Hey – trumpet
- Vesta Williams – backing vocals

== Charts ==
Chart (1986)	Peak position
US Billboard Hot 100	71
US Billboard Hot Black Singles	40
US Cashbox	66
