= I Like Your Style =

Studio album by Jermaine Jackson
- Released: 1981
- Recorded: 1981
- Studio: Yamaha Research & Development Studio, Glendale, CA; United/Western Studios, Hollywood, CA
- Genre: R&B
- Length: 43:05
- Label: Motown
- Producer: Jermaine Jackson

Jermaine Jackson chronology
Jermaine (1980)	I Like Your Style (1981)	Let Me Tickle Your Fancy (1982)

Singles from I Like Your Style
- 1. "I'm Just Too Shy" Released: September 1981; 2. "Paradise in Your Eyes" Released: February 1982

Professional ratings
Review scores
Source	Rating
AllMusic	3/5 stars
The Encyclopedia of Popular Music	2/5 stars
The New Rolling Stone Record Guide	1/5 stars

I Like Your Style is the eighth studio album by the American singer Jermaine Jackson. It was released in 1981 via Motown.

The album peaked at No. 86 on the Billboard 200.

== Track listing ==
Side A
No.	Title	Writer(s)	Length
1.	"I Gotta Have Ya"	Jermaine Jackson, Michael L. Smith, Paul Jackson, Jr.	5:09
2.	"I'm Just Too Shy"	Jackson	3:47
3.	"You're Givin' Me the Runaround"	Jackson, Paul Jackson, Jr.	3:36
4.	"Paradise in Your Eyes"	Jackson	5:10
5.	"Is It Always Gonna Be Like This" (duet with Rita Coolidge)	Jackson, Rita Coolidge	4:08

Side B
No.	Title	Writer(s)	Length
1.	"Signed, Sealed, Delivered, I'm Yours"	Lee Garrett, Lula Mae Hardaway, Stevie Wonder, Syreeta Wright	3:46
2.	"Maybe Next Time"	Jackson	3:58
3.	"I Can't Take No More"	Jackson, Clarence McDonald, Paul Jackson, Jr.	3:19
4.	"It's Still Undone"	Jackson	5:45
5.	"I'm My Brother's Keeper"	Jackson, Elliot Willensky	4:27

== Personnel ==
- Jermaine Jackson - vocals, bass, piano, Fender Rhodes, organ, Gsi synthesizer, drums, harmonica
- David T. Walker, Paul M. Jackson, Jr., Thom Rotella - guitar
- "Ready" Freddie Washington, Nathan Watts - bass
- Clarence McDonald, Joe Sample - keyboards
- Charles Mims Jr., Mike Lang - Fender Rhodes, organ
- Greg Phillinganes - synthesizer
- Ed Greene, Ollie E. Brown - drums
- Karen Jackson - vibraphone
- Ernie Watts - saxophone
- Charles B. Findley, Gary Grant, Gary Herbig, Jerry Hey, Larry Williams - horns
- Jerry Hey - horn arrangements
- Gayle Levant - harp
- Danny Harvey, Karen Jackson, Lathette Brooks, Michelle Jackson - handclaps
- Don Peake - rhythm, horn and string arrangement on "Is It Always Going to Be Like This"
- Gene Page - string arrangements
- Clarence McDonald (tracks: B3), Elliot Willensky (tracks: B5), Jermaine Jackson, Paul M. Jackson, Jr. (tracks: A1, A3, B1, B3), Rita Coolidge (tracks: A4) - rhythm arrangements
