= I Think It's Love =

1986 single by Jermaine Jackson

Single by Jermaine Jackson

from the album Precious Moments
- B-side: Voices in the Dark
- Released: January 1986
- Recorded: 1985
- Genre: R&B; Pop
- Length: 3:53
- Label: Arista; BMG
- Songwriters: Jermaine Jackson; Michael Omartian; Stevie Wonder
- Producer: Michael Omartian

Jermaine Jackson singles chronology
"(Closest Thing To) Perfect" (1985)	"I Think It's Love" (1986)	"Lonely Won't Leave Me Alone" (1986)

Music video
- "I Think It's Love" on YouTube

"I Think It's Love" is a song recorded by American R&B singer Jermaine Jackson. It was released as the first single to the album Precious Moments, and was a #16 pop hit on the Billboard Hot 100 chart in 1986.

== Personnel ==
- Jermaine Jackson – lead vocals, backing vocals
- Michael Omartian – Moog Source bass, drum programming, arrangements, horn arrangements
- Marcus Ryle – synthesizer programming
- Michael Landau – guitars
- Paulinho da Costa – percussion
- Gary Herbig – saxophones
- Kim Hutchcroft – saxophones
- Chuck Findley – trombone
- Jerry Hey – trumpet, horn arrangements
- Portia Griffin – backing vocals
- Julia Waters – backing vocals
- Mona Lisa Young – backing vocals

== Charts ==
Chart (1986)	Peak position
U.S. Billboard Hot 100	16
U.S. Billboard Adult Contemporary	5
U.S. Billboard Hot Black Singles	14
