= Don't Take It Personal (Jermaine Jackson song) =

Single by Jermaine Jackson

from the album Don't Take It Personal
- B-side: "Clean Up Your Act"
- Released: September 25, 1989
- Recorded: 1989
- Genre: R&B
- Length: 4:31
- Label: Arista; BMG
- Songwriters: David Conley; Derrick Culler; David Townsend
- Producers: David Conley; Derrick Culler; David Townsend

Jermaine Jackson singles chronology
"Words into Action" (1987)	"Don't Take It Personal" (1989)	"I'd Like to Get to Know You" (1990)

Music video
- "Don't Take It Personal" on YouTube

"Don't Take It Personal" is a 1989 single by Jermaine Jackson. The single was Jackson's second and final number one on the U.S. R&B chart. "Don't Take It Personal" peaked at number sixty-four on the Billboard Hot 100 pop chart.

The song was sampled by singer Monica for her similarly titled smash hit "Don't Take It Personal (Just One of Dem Days)".

== Background ==
The song was written and produced by David Conley and David Townsend, both members of the prominent R&B group Surface, along with singer-songwriter Derrick Culler. Initially, when Conley pitched the track to Arista Records, the label's A&R department strongly considered it for the pop duo Milli Vanilli, who were experiencing massive commercial success in the United States at the time. However, the decision was ultimately made to assign the song to Jackson, a move that revitalized his solo career as the decade drew to a close

== Composition ==
Musically, the song is a mid-tempo R&B breakup ballad that incorporates contemporary late-1980s new jack swing elements. Lyrically, the track portrays a narrator who is ready to amicably end a relationship that has run its course, advising his partner not to feel guilt or self-blame. The lyrical themes were directly inspired by co-writer Derrick Culler's real-life experiences during his divorce from his ex-wife.Craig Lytle of AllMusic praised the track's arrangement, noting that its "percussive beat and Jackson's comforting, cool vocals" successfully propelled the single to the top of the charts.

== Music video ==
The official music video for this song features a stylized, minimalist production that reflects the song's emotional theme. It heavily utilizes moody shadows and close-up shots of Jackson as he performs the song, highlighting the melancholy of a mutual breakup.

== Charts ==
The song was a commercial success, peaking at number one on the U.S. Billboard Hot R&B/Hip-Hop Songs chart and reaching number sixty-four on the Billboard Hot 100.

=== Weekly charts ===
Chart (1989–1990)	Peak position
US Billboard Hot 100	1
US Hot R&B/Hip-Hop Songs (Billboard)	1

=== Year-end charts ===
Chart (1989)	Position
US Hot R&B/Hip-Hop Songs (Billboard)	15
