= (Closest Thing To) Perfect =

1985 single by Jermaine Jackson

Single by Jermaine Jackson

from the album Perfect
- B-side: "(Closest Thing To) Perfect (instrumental)"
- Released: May 8, 1985
- Recorded: 1985
- Genre: R&B; Pop
- Length: 3:50
- Label: Arista; BMG
- Songwriter(s): Michael Omartian; Jermaine Jackson; Bruce Sudano
- Producer(s): Michael Omartian

Jermaine Jackson singles chronology
"When the Rain Begins to Fall" (1985)	"(Closest Thing To) Perfect" (1985)	"I Think It's Love" (1986)

Music video
- "(Closest Thing To) Perfect" on YouTube

"(Closest Thing To) Perfect" is a song recorded by American R&B singer Jermaine Jackson. It was released as a single to the soundtrack from the 1985 film, Perfect. A music video was filmed featuring Jamie Lee Curtis as an aerobics instructor and John Travolta.

== Charts ==
Chart (1985)	Peak position
U.S. Billboard Hot 100	67
U.S. Billboard Hot Black Singles	63
