= Don't Take It Personal (album) =

Studio album by Jermaine Jackson
- Released: August 22, 1989
- Recorded: 1989
- Genre: R&B
- Length: 46:12
- Label: Arista; BMG
- Producer: Rick Nowels; Lewis A. Martinee; Danny Sembello; David Townsend; David Z; Preston Glass; Ron Kersey; Dennis Lambert

Jermaine Jackson chronology
Precious Moments (1986)	Don't Take It Personal (1989)	You Said (1991)

Singles from Don't Take It Personal
- 1. "Don't Take It Personal" Released: September 25, 1989; 2. "I'd Like To Get To Know You" Released: 1990; 3. "Two Ships" Released: 1990

Don't Take It Personal is the twelfth studio album by the American singer Jermaine Jackson, released in 1989. The title track became his second and final US R&B #1 single, and was followed by two more top 30 US R&B hits, "I'd Like to Get to Know You" and "Two Ships".

In 2012, the album was reissued by Funky Town Grooves with an extended track listing.

== Critical reception ==
Professional ratings
Review scores
Source	Rating
AllMusic	3/5 stars
Robert Christgau	C−
The Encyclopedia of Popular Music	2/5 stars
The Rolling Stone Album Guide	2/5 stars

Robert Christgau wrote: "A mild-voiced journeyman whose heyday is 10 if not 20 years behind him, [Jackson]'s equally bland as love man (title hit promises they can still be friends) and stud (though he does thank six foals on the back cover)." The Calgary Herald called the album "a bunch of sappy love songs that aren't particularly good."

== Track listing ==
No.	Title	Writer(s)	Producer(s)	Length
1.	"Climb Out"	Danny Sembello; Marti Sharron	Kashif; Marti Sharron; Danny Sembello	4:37
2.	"Don't Take It Personal"	David Conley; David Townsend; Derrick Culler	David "Pic" Conley; David Townsend; Derrick Culler (assoc.)	4:29
3.	"Make It Easy on Love" (with Miki Howard)	Clif Magness; Peter Beckett; Steve Kipner	Dennis Lambert; Rick Nowels (add.)	4:14
4.	"So Right"	Ernie McCane; Ian Prince	Preston Glass	5:02
5.	"I'd Like to Get to Know You"	Bernard Jackson	Kashif; Steve Lindsey (assoc.)	4:39
6.	"Two Ships (In the Night)"	Conley; Jermaine Jackson; Everett Collins	Conley	5:08
7.	"Rise to the Occasion" (with La La)	Simon Climie; Rob Fisher; Dennis Morgan	David Z; Ricky P (assoc.)	4:44
8.	"(C'mon) Feel the Need"	Lewis A. Martineé	Lewis A. Martineé	4:34
9.	"Next to You"	Clyde Lieberman; Jeff Pescetto	Glass	4:01
10.	"Don't Make Me Wait"	Otis Stokes	David Z; Ricky P (assoc.); Ron "Have Mercy" Kersey (add.)	4:30

Bonus tracks (2012 reissue)

No.	Title	Writer(s)	Length
11.	"Don't Take It Personal" (Extended version)	Conley; Townsend; Culler	5:30
12.	"Don't Take It Personal" (Jazzy Instrumental)	Conley; Townsend; Culler	5:18
13.	"I'd Like to Get to Know You" (7" version)	B. Jackson	4:01
14.	"Two Ships (In the Night)" (Instrumental remix version)	Conley; J. Jackson; Collins	7:01
15.	"Two Ships (In the Night)" (Lat Night Turbulence Mix)	Conley; J. Jackson; Collins	4:41
16.	"Two Ships (In the Night)" (Extended version)	Conley; J. Jackson; Collins	6:39

B-side

- ''Spare the Rod, Love the Child'' (single "I'd Like to Get to Know You")

== Personnel ==
Adapted from AllMusic.

- "Bassy" Bob Brockmann – mixing (5, 6)
- Tony Calvert – reissue producer
- David "Pic" Conley – mixing (2, 6)
- Eileen Connelly – art direction
- Clive Davis – executive producer
- Maureen Droney – mixing (4, 9)
- Mick Guzauski – mixing (3)
- Calvin H. Harris – mixing (7)
- Miki Howard – guest artist
- Jermaine Jackson – primary artist
- La La – guest artist
- Willie Maldonado – photography
- Lewis A. Martineé – mixing (8)
- Matt Murphy – production manager
- Danny Sembello – mixing (1)
- Marti Sharron – mixing (1)
- Hill Swimmer – mixing (10)
- David Townsend – mixing (2)
- Kerk Upper – mixing (5)
- Mark Wilder – remastering
- Roger Williams – package design

== Charts ==
=== Weekly charts ===
Chart (1989)	Peak position
US Billboard 200	115
US Top R&B/Hip-Hop Albums (Billboard)	10

=== Year-end charts ===
Chart (1990)	Position
US Top R&B/Hip-Hop Albums (Billboard)	59
