= My Name Is Jermaine =

Studio album by Jermaine Jackson
- Released: August 1976
- Recorded: 1976
- Studio: Motown Recording Studios (Hollywood, California)
- Genre: Funk, soul
- Length: 38:21
- Label: Motown
- Producer: Greg Wright, Michael Lovesmith, Gwen Glen, Jeffrey Bowen, Hal Davis, Michael B. Sutton

Jermaine Jackson chronology
Come Into My Life (1973)	My Name Is Jermaine (1976)	Feel The Fire (1977)

My Name Is Jermaine is the third solo studio album from Jermaine Jackson and the first post-Jackson 5 album from him. It was released in 1976. The single released from this album was "Let's Be Young Tonight" which went to No. #19 on the Black Singles chart.

== Reception ==
Professional ratings
Review scores
Source	Rating
AllMusic	2/5 stars

In 1975, The Jackson 5 released what would be their final album recorded for Motown, Moving Violation. Tired of his sons not being able to write their own songs, Joseph Jackson devised an exit strategy from Motown. Jermaine, however, remained with the label. With Jermaine gone, the youngest Jackson brother, Randy, joined the group and since the "Jackson 5" trademark was owned by Motown, the brothers renamed themselves The Jacksons and moved to Epic Records where they scored more hits like "Enjoy Yourself", "Shake Your Body (Down to the Ground)", "This Place Hotel", and many more. Jermaine would not join his brothers again until the Motown 25 TV special in 1983.

For Jermaine's first album without his brothers, Berry Gordy hired a who's-who of Motown producers, including Hal Davis (who was instrumental in part of the brothers' success) and Jeffrey Bowen.

== Track listing ==
Side A

1. "Let's Be Young Tonight" (Don Daniels, Michael L. Smith) - 5:50
2. "Faithful" (featuring Thelma Houston) (Don Daniels, Michael L. Smith) - 5:14
3. "Look Past My Life" (Terri McFaddin, Greg Wright) - 3:21
4. "Bass Odyssey" (Greg Wright) - 3:27

Side B

1. "Who's That Lady" (Kenneth Lupper, Hubert Heard) - 4:07
2. "Lovely You're the One" (Jeffrey Bowen, Truman Thomas, James Henry Ford) - 4:04
3. "Stay With Me" (Michael B. Sutton, Brenda Sutton) - 2:51
4. "I Just Want to Take This Time" (Eric Robinson, Victor Orsborn) - 4:31
5. "My Touch of Madness" (Michael L. Smith) - 4:56

== Personnel ==
Technical

- Berry Gordy - executive producer
- Michael L. Smith, Greg Wright, Clay Drayton, Kenneth Lupper, William Bickelhaupt, Truman Thomas, Arthur G. Wright, William Goldstein - arrangements
- Harry Langdon - cover photography

== Charts ==
Year	Album	Chart positions	
Year	Album	US	US R&B
1976	My Name Is Jermaine	164	28

=== Singles ===
Year	Single	Chart positions		
Year	Single	US	US R&B	US Dance
1976	"Let's Be Young Tonight"	55	19	—
