= Amherst Records =

American record label

- Parent company: Tommy Boy Records
- Founded: 1957
- Founder: Leonard Silver
- Distributor(s): Self-distributed
- Genre: various
- Country of origin: USA
- Location: Buffalo, New York
- Official website: www.amherstrecords.com

Amherst Records is an American independent music label, founded in 1957 by the late Leonard Silver, who later on founded Buffalo-based music store Record Theatre. In 1984, Amherst acquired the back catalogs of Avco Records.

== Notable artists ==
- Spyro Gyra
- Glenn Medeiros
- Doc Severinsen
- The Tonight Show Band
- Jackie DeShannon
- David LaFlamme
- Solomon Burke
- The Stylistics
