= Jermaine Jackson =

American musician (born 1954)

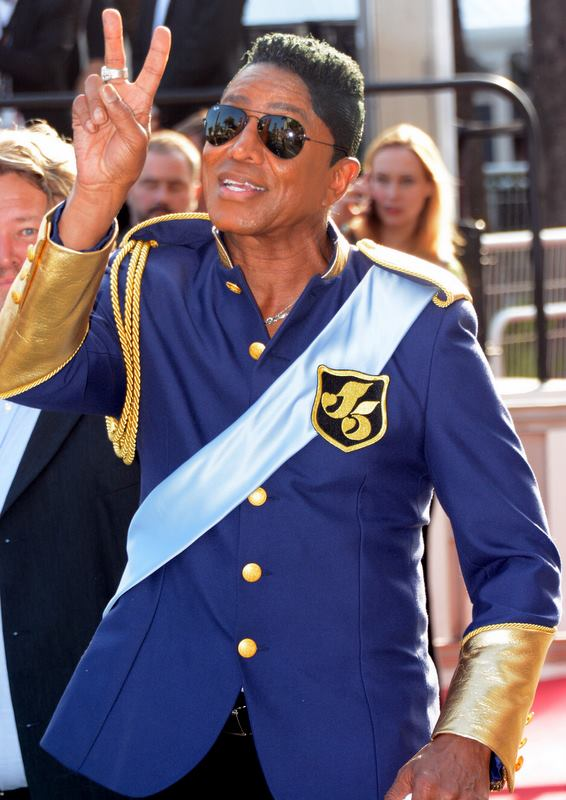
- Jackson in 2017
- Born: Jermaine La Juane Jackson; December 11, 1954 (age 71); Gary, Indiana, U.S.
- Occupations: Musician; singer
- Years active: 1964–present
- Spouses: Hazel Gordy (m. 1973; div. 1988) Alejandra Oaziaza (m. 1995; div. 2004) Halima Rashid (m. 2004; div. 2016)
- Partners: Margaret Maldonado (1986–1993); Maday Velazquez (2016–present; engaged)
- Children: 8, including Jaafar
- Parents: Joe Jackson (father); Katherine Jackson (mother)
- Family: Jackson
- Musical career
- Genres: Pop; R&B; soul; funk
- Instruments: Vocals; bass
- Labels: Steeltown; Motown; Arista; LaFace
- Formerly of: Jackson 5; The Jacksons
- Website: jermainejacksonentertainment.com

Jermaine La Juane Jacksun (né Jackson, later Muhammad Abdul-Aziz Sharif; born December 11, 1954) is an American musician. A member of the Jackson family, he was second vocalist after his brother Michael of the Jackson 5 from 1964 to 1975, and played bass guitar. In 1983, he rejoined the group, which had been renamed The Jacksons; he then consistently played in the group's performances and recordings until he left the group again in 2020.

While Jermaine did not usually sing the lead vocal on the Jackson 5's biggest hits, he is featured on "I'll Be There" and "I Want You Back", among others. When four of the brothers left Motown Records for Epic Records in 1976 (renaming the group "the Jacksons" in the process), Jackson, who had just married Motown founder Berry Gordy's daughter Hazel, stayed at Motown. He was replaced in the Jacksons by his youngest brother, Randy. Jermaine had a solo career concurrent with his brother Michael's, including some top-30 hits, until the 1980s. He produced and recorded duets with Whitney Houston on her debut album in 1985, and was a producer for the band Switch.

== Early life ==
Jermaine LaJuane Jackson was born December 11, 1954, at St Mary's Mercy Hospital in Gary, Indiana, the fourth child of Joseph and Katherine Jackson. His siblings are Rebbie, Jackie, Tito, La Toya, Marlon, Brandon (Marlon's twin, who died shortly after birth in 1957), Michael, Randy, and Janet. Jackson's father, Joe, had musical ambitions and played guitar with his brother Luther in an R&B group, the Falcons, while his mother, Katherine, a devout Jehovah's Witness, was an enthusiastic pianist and singer. Their large family and limited means led Katherine to become a housewife and Joe to work at the Inland Steel Company in East Chicago, Indiana, before the family moved to Gary in 1950.

While Joe worked long hours as a crane operator, Jackson and his brothers Tito and Jackie practiced secretly using Joe's guitar and sang harmonies with their mother. Jackson was the original lead singer and bassist of the Jackson Brothers, an early version of the Jackson 5, until 1966, when his younger brother Michael began singing lead. Joe began rehearsing his sons under a strict routine after recognizing their potential, viewing their talent as a path out of Gary. Jackson continued to sing occasional lead vocals over the years. He graduated from Birmingham High School in Van Nuys, Los Angeles, California, in 1973.

== Career ==
=== The Jackson 5 ===
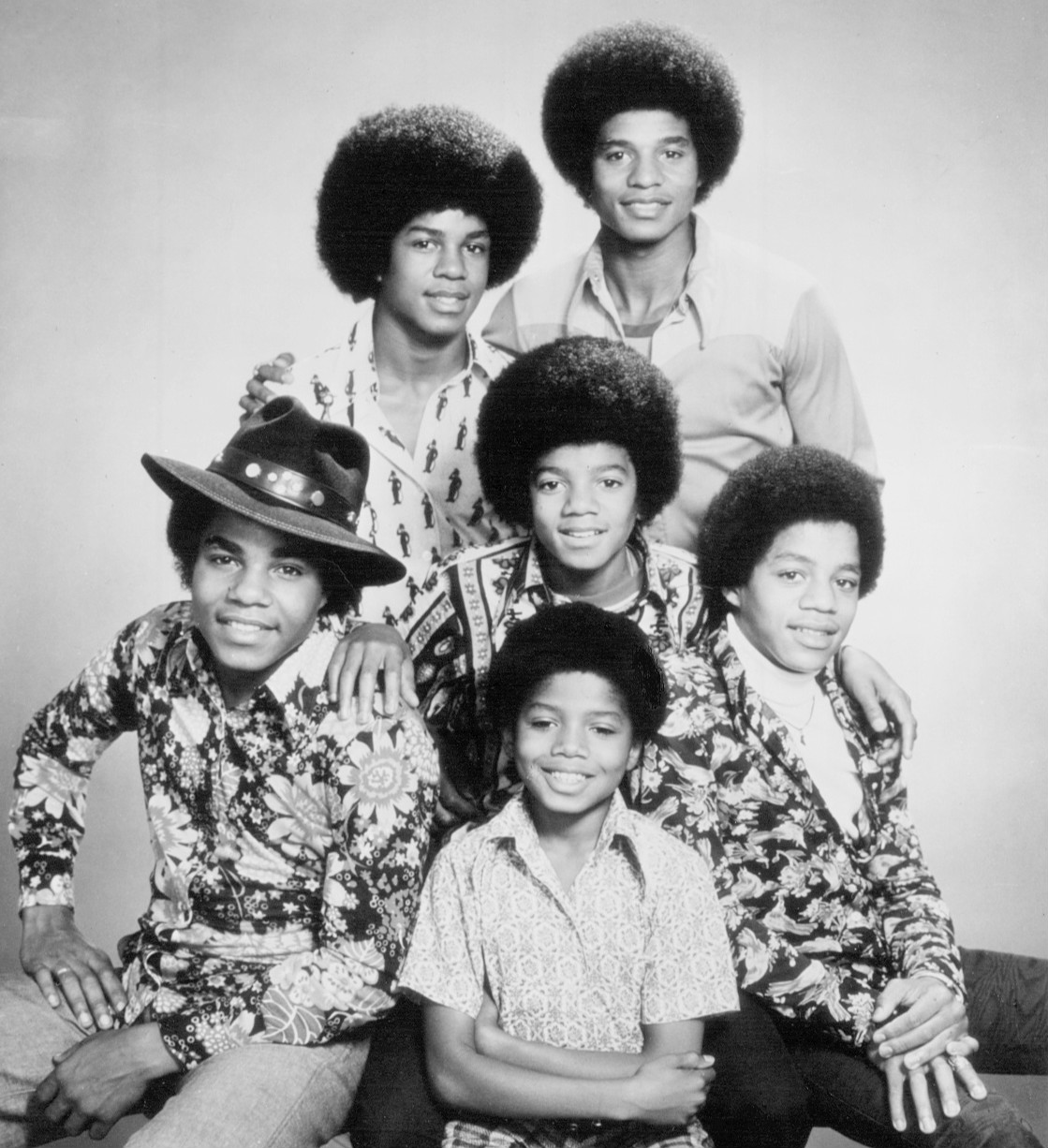
Jermaine (top left) and his brothers in 1974

Jackson and his brothers first signed as the Jackson 5 with Gordon Keith of Steeltown Records in November 1967, and their first single "Big Boy", was released on January 31, 1968. After the group recorded three more songs with the Steeltown label (on two records) they were signed with Berry Gordy of Motown Records in 1969. As the second lead singer of the Jackson 5 with his brothers Jackie and Michael, Jackson sang notable parts of "I Want You Back", "ABC", "I'll Be There", "The Love You Save", "Dancing Machine" and many other Jackson 5 songs. Jackson performed as part of the group for six years. Not feeling that they were being paid fair royalties by Motown Records for their success as well as their desire for creative control, the Jackson 5 decided to leave the label and sign with Epic Records in 1975. However, Jackson decided to stay with Motown Records, citing loyalty to the company as the reason. Others argue that Jackson's marriage to Motown founder Berry Gordy's daughter Hazel, whom he married in 1973, was a deciding factor.

Jackson split from the Jackson 5 to start a solo career at Motown, and was replaced by his brother Randy. Unbeknownst to the group, Gordy had trademarked the name Jackson 5 and did not allow the group to continue using the name when they left the label. Once signed with Epic, the group became known simply as the Jacksons. In 1983, Gordy asked the group to perform at the Motown 25: Yesterday, Today, Forever television special. After the success of the broadcast, Jackson finally rejoined the band to record the album Victory which featured all six brothers on the album cover. Jackson also participated in the band's Victory Tour. He stayed with the group for their final album, 2300 Jackson Street, in 1989. Jackson performed the song "If You'd Only Believe" on March 15, 1993, with his brothers Jackie, Tito and Randy, on the stage of the Grand Théâtre de Genève for the Evening of the Nations. He also performed this song alone on January 14, 1990, in Atlanta, in tribute to Martin Luther King Jr., during King Week 90'. In 1997, he was inducted into the Rock and Roll Hall of Fame with the Jackson 5. In 2001, he reunited with his brothers to perform for the Michael Jackson: 30th Anniversary Celebration. He was voiced by Joel Cooper on the 1971-1972 animated series Jackson 5ive and played by Colin Steele and his son Jermaine Jr. in the 1992 miniseries The Jacksons: An American Dream and by Jamal R. Henderson and Jayden Harville in the 2026 film Michael.

=== Solo career ===
Like Michael, Jackson began a solo career while still a member of the Jackson 5, and had a hit with the 1972 Shep and the Limelites cover "Daddy's Home" on his debut album Jermaine. It sold over one million copies by March 1973 and was awarded a gold disc. When the Jackson 5 left Motown in 1975, Jackson left the group and stayed at the label until 1983; Jermaine then signed with Clive Davis' label, Arista Records, that same year. He finally rejoined his brothers for the Motown 25 television special, and their album Victory the following year. Jermaine was nominated for the Grammy Award for Best Male R&B Vocal Performance for his 1980 single "Let's Get Serious" at the 23rd Annual Grammy Awards. He had a number of Billboard Hot 100 hits throughout the 1970s and 1980s, including "That's How Love Goes" and "Daddy's Home" (No. 9) from Jermaine in 1972, "You're in Good Hands" from Come into My Life in 1973, "Let's Be Young Tonight" from My Name Is Jermaine in 1976, "Let's Get Serious" (No. 9, also one of his only two UK singles chart hits, peaking at No. 8) and "You're Supposed to Keep Your Love for Me" from Let's Get Serious in 1980, "Let Me Tickle Your Fancy" (featuring Devo on backing vocals) (No. 18) from the album of the same name in 1982, "Dynamite" (No. 15) and "Do What You Do" (No. 13) from his self-titled album in 1984 and "I Think It's Love" (No. 16) from Precious Moments in 1986. A duet with his brother Michael, "Tell Me I'm Not Dreamin' (Too Good to Be True)" from his self-titled album, hit number one on the dance chart in 1984. Michael and he also collaborated with Rockwell, both providing guest vocals on his 1984 hit single, "Somebody's Watching Me" from the album of the same name.

In 1985, Jackson's duet with Pia Zadora, "When the Rain Begins to Fall", topped several singles charts in Europe, including Germany and France; in the United States, the duet only reached number 54 on the Billboard Hot 100. Later that same year, he contributed "(Closest Thing To) Perfect" to the motion picture Perfect, which reached number 67 in the U.S. In a promotional music video made during the film's production, Jackson was featured along with the film's stars John Travolta and Jamie Lee Curtis. His final chart success, 1989's "Don't Take It Personal" from the album of the same name, hit number one on the R&B singles chart. Other notable Jackson songs include the Earth Wind & Fire-inspired "You Need to Be Loved" from the 1977 album Feel the Fire and the soulful "Castles of Sand" from the 1978 album Frontiers. Jackson was the executive producer of The Jackson Family Honors concert televised from the MGM Grand on February 22, 1994. On May 19, 2003, he performed "Let's Start Right Now" live on the talk show The View.

Jackson is proficient on the electric guitar and is a talented bass guitar player. At an early age, he performed the parts of legendary bass player James Jamerson and others when the Jackson 5 performed live. His main instrument was a Gibson EB-3. Jackson also composed and produced for other artists, such as Switch and he produced and sang duets on Whitney Houston's debut album for Arista Records. Jackson is featured on the Switch track "Tahiti Hut" released in 2019, recorded during the 1980 Reaching for Tomorrow sessions.

=== Reality television ===
Jackson was the first housemate to enter the Celebrity Big Brother 5 house in 2007, which he placed 2nd. After leaving Big Brother, Jackson did several interviews on British television explaining why and how he took his peaceful and mediating stance in the Big Brother house. He also spoke about the Jackson 5 reuniting for a performance. Jackson was part of the second season of the CMT reality show Gone Country. On the premiere episode of season three of the ABC reality show Celebrity Wife Swap on April 15, 2014, Jackson and his wife Halima swapped places with Daniel Baldwin and his on-again, off-again girlfriend Isabella Hofmann.

=== Later work ===
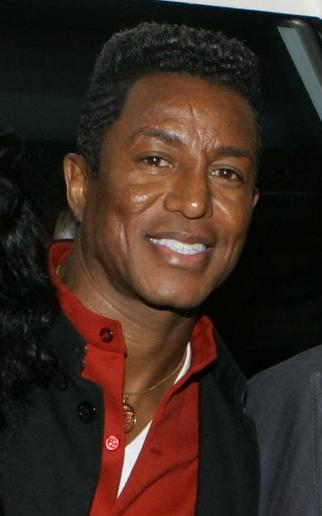
Jackson in 2007

In April 2007, Jackson returned to the UK to take part in a one-off special of ITV's Challenge Anneka. On the same trip, he appeared in Glasgow with British prime minister Gordon Brown, speaking in support of Searchlight magazine's anti racism campaign, the Daily Mirror "Hope Not Hate Bus".

On November 23, 2007, Jackson appeared on Katie & Peter: Unleashed and again talked of a reunion with his brothers on a tour the following year. In 2008, Jackson flew to Australia to be a guest judge and mentor for the top-five Michael Jackson night on Australian Idol season 6. In March 2008, Jackson was the guest of honor at the Muslim Writers Awards in Birmingham. In 2009, following his brother Michael's passing, Jackson appeared on the A&E television series The Jacksons: A Family Dynasty, documenting what was supposed to be a 40th-anniversary reunion between Jackson and his brothers. The series lasted one season and Jackson, along with his three brothers, was listed as an executive producer. In October 2010, Jermaine played a concert at the Planet Hollywood hotel and casino in Las Vegas, naming it 40 Years of Jackson Music and dedicating the concert to Michael. He wrote the memoir You Are Not Alone: Michael Through a Brother's Eyes (2011).

In a 2012 interview with Luka Neskovic, for The Huffington Post, Jackson said that his brother Michael planned a reunion with him: "... the plan was to do some shows with the brothers, as well, after he finished his commitment with the This Is It [concert], and we probably gonna do some songs with him on the This Is It tour". In October 2012, Jackson released I Wish You L.O.V.E, his first solo album in 21 years, consisting mostly of jazz covers. The album was arranged and produced by French opera singer David Serero, who recorded a duet on "Autumn Leaves" with Jackson, and was released by David Serero Productions. They both performed You Are Not Alone: The Musical, written, directed and produced by Serero, in France in January 2013. The following year, You Are Not Alone: The Musical Live was released on video and audio.

== Personal life ==
Jackson has been married and divorced three times, and has eight children. His first marriage was to Hazel Gordy, the daughter of Motown founder Berry Gordy. They were married from 1973 to 1988. They had three children; Jermaine La Juane "Jay" Jackson Jr. (born 1977), Autumn Joi Jackson (born 1978), and Jaimy Jermaine Jackson (born 1987). Jackson was in a relationship with Margaret Maldonado from 1986 until 1993. They had two sons, Jeremy Maldonado Jackson (born 1986) and Jourdynn Michael Jackson (born 1989). From 1995 to 2004, he was married to Alejandra Genevieve Oaziaza, former girlfriend of his brother Randy. They had two sons, Jaafar Jeremiah Jackson (born 1996) and Jermajesty Jermaine Jackson (born 2000). Jaafar later portrayed his uncle Michael in the 2026 film Michael. In 2004, Jackson married Halima Rashid in a mosque in Los Angeles. Rashid was arrested in 2015 in Los Angeles for alleged domestic violence. She filed a petition for divorce in 2016, citing irreconcilable differences. Jackson began a relationship with Maday Velazquez in 2016 and became engaged in 2018. They have a son named Abu Bakr Khalifa.

Jackson supported his brother Michael during his 2005 trial. He defended him on CNN's Larry King Live and appeared with him in court on multiple occasions. Jackson announced his brother's death on June 25, 2009, at a press conference at Ronald Reagan UCLA Medical Center. He thanked those who attended Michael's memorial at the Staples Center, on July 7, 2009. Jackson and his brothers, Tito, Jackie, Marlon, and Randy served as pallbearers, wearing gold neckties, a single white glove, and sunglasses.

Jackson, like the rest of his family, was raised as a Jehovah's Witness. In 1989, he converted to Islam after a trip to Bahrain, where he was struck by the devotion of local children to their religion. Upon converting, he took the name Muhammad Abdul‑Aziz Sharif but continued to use his birth name. In 2013, he changed his first name back to Jermaine and modified his surname to Jacksun.

On December 27, 2023, a lawsuit was filed in Los Angeles Superior Court by a woman who alleged Jackson sexually assaulted her after forcing himself into her home in 1988. The woman, identified as Rita Barrett, also alleged that the Motown Records owner, Berry Gordy, helped conceal the abuse. Court records cited by TMZ show that a default judgment was entered requiring Jackson to pay Barrett more than $6.5 million in damages and costs. On June 30, 2026, Jackson's request to have the judgment thrown out was granted.

== Discography ==
- Jermaine (1972)
- Come into My Life (1973)
- My Name Is Jermaine (1976)
- Feel the Fire (1977)
- Frontiers (1978)
- Let's Get Serious (1980)
- Jermaine (1980)
- I Like Your Style (1981)
- Let Me Tickle Your Fancy (1982)
- Dynamite (1984)
- Precious Moments (1986)
- Don't Take It Personal (1989)
- You Said (1991)
- I Wish You L.O.V.E (2012)
- You Are Not Alone: The Musical Live (2014)

== Filmography ==
Film and television
Year	Title	Role	Notes
1969	The Hollywood Palace	Himself	Episode: "7.2"
1970	The Andy Williams Show	Himself	Episode: "The Jackson 5, Ken Berry, Carl Ballantine, Rosey Grier, Sergio Mendes & Brasil '66"
1970	The Jim Nabors Hour	Himself	Episode: "The Jackson 5"
1971	Diana!	Himself	Television special
1971	Goin' Back to Indiana	Himself	Television special
1971–1972	The Flip Wilson Show	Himself	2 episodes
1972	The ABC Comedy Hour	Himself	Episode: "Hellzapoppin"
1972	The Sonny & Cher Comedy Hour	Himself	Episode: "3.1"
1972	The Jackson 5 Show	Himself	Television special
1973	Save the Children	Himself	Concert film
1973	The Bob Hope Show	Himself	Episode: "Ann-Margret, John Denver, Bobby Riggs, The Jackson 5"
1974	One More Time	Himself	Television special
1974	The Sonny Comedy Revue	Himself	Episode: "Sally Struthers, Howard Cosell, The Jackson 5"
1974	Sandy in Disneyland	Himself	Television special
1974–1975	The Carol Burnett Show	Himself	2 episodes
1975	Cher	Himself	Episode: "1.6"
1982	The Facts of Life	Himself	Episode: "Starstruck"
1984	Voyage of the Rock Aliens	Rain	
1984	As the World Turns	Concert Performer	Episode: "Cinderella Concert"
1985	Cocoricocoboy	Himself	Episode: "February 6, 1985"
1992	The Jacksons: American Dreams	—	Producer
1994	The Jackson Family Honors	—	Executive producer
2001	Longshot	Himself	
2007	Celebrity Big Brother	Himself	30 episodes
2008	Gone Country	Himself	7 episodes
2009	The Jacksons: A Family Dynasty	Himself	Executive producer
2013	You Are Not Alone, the Musical	Singer	Credited as Jermaine Jacksun
2014	Celebrity Wife Swap	Himself	Episode: "Daniel Baldwin/Jermaine Jackson"
2026	Michael	—	Executive producer

== Tours ==
- Precious Moments Tour (1986)
- Jermaine Jackson Australian Tour (1987–88)
