= Michael Jackson singles discography =

Singles recorded by American singer

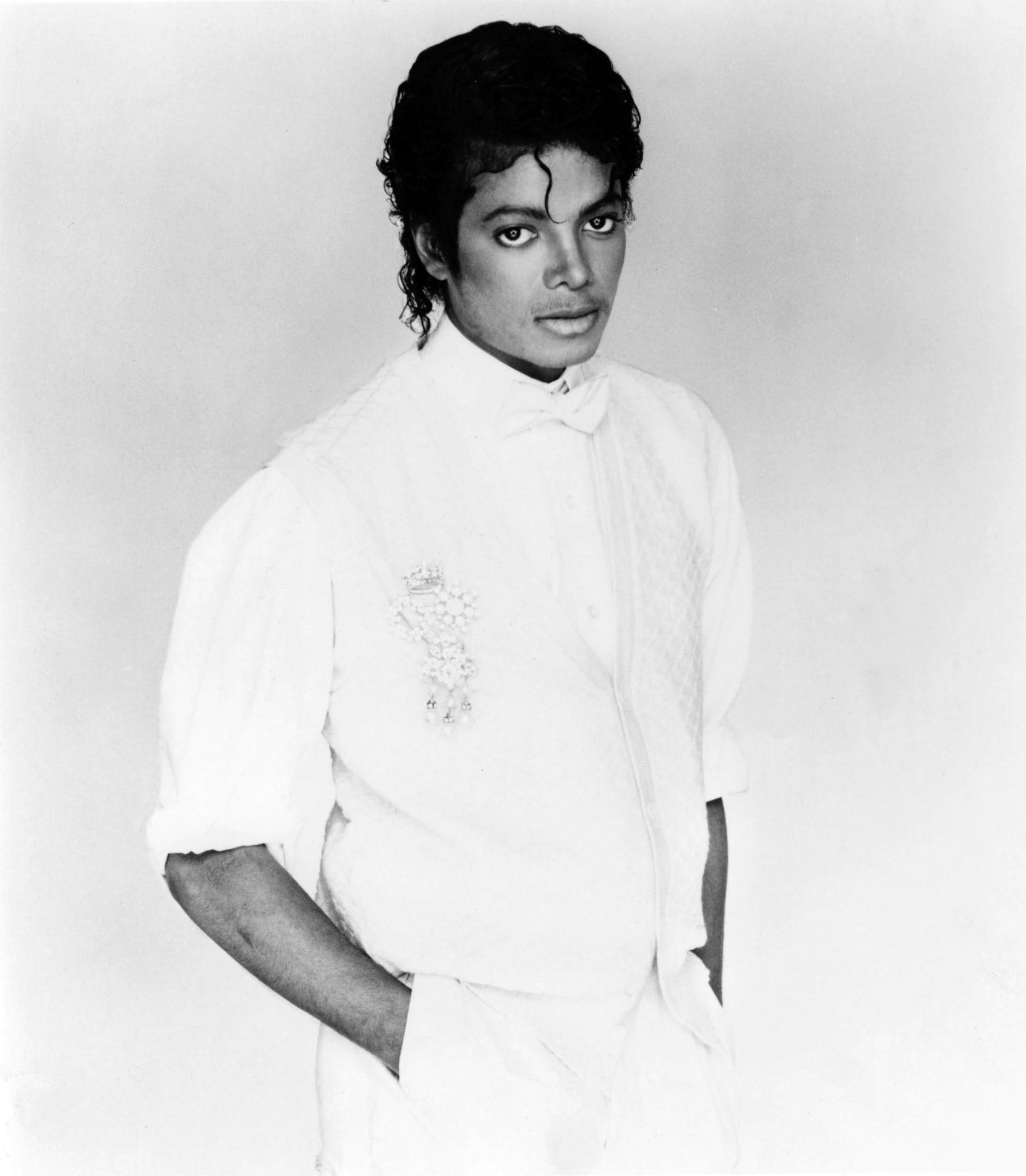
- Jackson in 1983
- As lead artist: 67
- As featured artist: 8
- Other appearances: 13
- Promotional or limited release: 52

American singer and songwriter Michael Jackson (1958–2009) released 67 singles as a lead artist and eight as a featured artist. As one of the best-selling artists of all time, Jackson has sold over 500 million records worldwide. In the United States, Jackson has amassed 13 Billboard Hot 100 number-one singles (more than any other male artist in the Hot 100 era), and became the first artist to ever have top-ten singles in the Billboard Hot 100 in six different decades (seven with The Jackson 5‘s I Want You Back). In 2012, Jackson was ranked the fifth best selling singles artist in the United Kingdom, with 15.3 million singles sold.

Jackson's first solo entry on the US Billboard Hot 100 singles chart was "Got to Be There", released in 1971, which peaked at number four. Jackson's first number-one hit on the chart was "Ben", released in 1972. Jackson continued to release singles throughout the 1970s. His fifth album, Off the Wall (1979), contains five singles, including the chart-topping hits "Don't Stop 'Til You Get Enough" and "Rock with You". Both are certified multi-platinum by the Recording Industry Association of America (RIAA) in the United States for sales in excess of 6 million copies. The next two singles—"Off the Wall" and "She's Out of My Life"—also reached the top 10 of the Billboard Hot 100 and made Jackson the first solo artist to have four singles from the same album reach the U.S. top 10.

His sixth album, Thriller (1982), contains "The Girl Is Mine" (a collaboration with Paul McCartney), which was released as the first single from the album. The single peaked at number two on the Billboard Hot 100. "Billie Jean", released as the album's second single, topped the charts in 13 countries, including the United States. The single sold more than 10 million copies in the United States and over 1.4 million in the United Kingdom. "Beat It", released a month later, peaked at number one in nine countries and sold more than eight million copies in the United States. "Thriller", released as a single in November 1983, peaked at number four on the Billboard Hot 100. The single sold 10 million copies in the US alone, making it Jackson's best-selling single. In 1983, Jackson once again collaborated with McCartney on "Say Say Say", released as the first single from McCartney's Pipes of Peace album. It was a number-one hit in the United States.

Jackson's seventh album, Bad (1987), contains nine singles with seven charting in the United States. Five of these singles ("I Just Can't Stop Loving You", "Bad", "The Way You Make Me Feel", "Man in the Mirror", and "Dirty Diana"), reached number one on the Billboard Hot 100, a record for most number-one singles from any one album.

His eighth album, Dangerous (1991), which he co-produced with Teddy Riley, contains four top-ten singles on the Billboard Hot 100: "Remember the Time", "In the Closet", "Will You Be There" (produced and performed by Jackson as the theme for the film, Free Willy), and the number-one hit "Black or White".

In June 1995, Jackson released his ninth album, HIStory: Past, Present and Future, Book I, as a double album. The first disc, HIStory Begins, is a 15-track greatest hits album. The second disc, HIStory Continues, contains 13 original songs and two cover versions. The album contains four singles: "Scream" (a duet with Jackson's youngest sister Janet), "Earth Song", "They Don't Care About Us", and "You Are Not Alone". "You Are Not Alone" holds the Guinness World Record for the first single ever to debut at number one on the Billboard Hot 100 chart. "Earth Song" was released as the third single from HIStory and topped the UK Singles Chart for six weeks over Christmas 1995, and sold over 1.2 million copies, making it one of Jackson's most successful singles in the UK. Jackson worked with collaborators, including Teddy Riley and Rodney Jerkins, to produce his tenth album, Invincible (2001), which spawned three singles: "You Rock My World", "Cry", and "Butterflies".

Following Jackson's death in 2009, sales of his previous work soared and Jackson became the first act to sell more than 1 million song downloads in a week, with 2.6 million downloads. Following the surge in sales in March 2010, Sony Music signed a $250 million deal with the Jackson estate to extend their distribution rights to Jackson's back catalog until at least 2017. As part of this deal, two posthumous albums of previously unreleased tracks were released: Michael (2010) and Xscape (2014). In 2017, Sony renewed its deal for $250 million, which went into effect in January 2018.

== As lead artist ==
List of singles as lead artist, with chart positions, sales and certifications, showing year released and album name
Title	Year	Peak chart positions										Sales	Certifications	Album
Title	Year	US	AUS	CAN	FRA (Note: Prior to November 1984, there were no reliable weekly charts from France. In 2000, Fabrice Ferment, in collaboration with SNEP, compiled monthly charts for the period's pre-SNEP charts based on retail sales of the time.)	GER	NL	NZ	SPN	SWI	UK	Sales	Certifications	Album
"Got to Be There"	1971	4	83	3	—	—	—	—	—	—	5	US: 1,600,000; WW: 4,000,000		Got to Be There
"Rockin' Robin"	1972	2	16	13	—	—	—	16	19	—	3	US: 2,000,000; WW: 4,000,000	BPI: Silver	Got to Be There
"I Wanna Be Where You Are"	1972	16	—	57	—	—	—	—	—	—	—	US: 1,000,000		Got to Be There
"Ain't No Sunshine"	1972	—	—	—	—	—	16	—	—	99	8			Got to Be There
"Ben"	1972	1	1	6	81	—	2	12	19	—	7	US: 1,700,000; WW: 2,800,000	BPI: Silver; RMNZ: Gold	Ben
"With a Child's Heart"	1973	50	—	60	—	—	—	—	—	—	—			Music & Me
"Morning Glow"	1973	—	98	—	—	—	—	—	—	—	—			Music & Me
"Music and Me"	1973	—	—	—	—	—	34	—	—	—	—			Music & Me
"Happy"	1973	—	31	—	—	—	—	21	—	—	52 (Note: "Happy" was not originally released in the UK as a single from Music & Me. It peaked at number 52 there when it was released as a single from the compilation 18 Greatest Hits in 1983.)			Music & Me
"We're Almost There"	1975	54	—	79	—	—	61	21	—	—	46 (Note: "We're Almost There" was not originally released in the UK as a single from Forever, Michael. It peaked at number 46 there when it was released as a single from the compilation One Day in Your Life in 1981.)			Forever, Michael
"Just a Little Bit of You"	1975	23	—	43	—	—	—	—	—	—	—			Forever, Michael
"Ease On down the Road" (with Diana Ross)	1978	41	—	35	—	—	47	—	—	—	45			The Wiz: Original Soundtrack
"You Can't Win"	1979	81	—	—	—	—	—	—	—	—	—			The Wiz: Original Soundtrack
"A Brand New Day" (with Diana Ross & The Wiz Stars)	1979	—	—	—	—	—	1	—	—	—	—			The Wiz: Original Soundtrack
"Don't Stop 'Til You Get Enough"	1979	1	1	3	15	13	2	1	2	4	3	AUS: 100,000; UK: 812,000	RIAA: Platinum; RIAA: 5× Platinum (Digital); ARIA: Platinum; BPI: 2× Platinum; BVMI: Gold; MC: 3× Platinum; RMNZ: 2× Platinum	Off the Wall
"Rock with You"	1979	1	4	3	59	58	—	3	1	68	7	UK: 399,000	RIAA: Platinum; RIAA: 5× Platinum; ARIA: Gold; BPI: 2× Platinum; MC: 2× Platinum; RMNZ: 4× Platinum	Off the Wall
"Off the Wall"	1979	10	94	11	—	—	23	14	—	81	7		RIAA: Platinum; BPI: Gold; RMNZ: Gold	Off the Wall
"She's Out of My Life"	1980	10	17	15	—	—	19	6	—	97	3		RIAA: Platinum; BPI: Silver	Off the Wall
"Girlfriend"	1980	—	—	—	—	—	—	49	—	—	41		RMNZ: Gold	Off the Wall
"One Day in Your Life" (Note: "One Day in Your Life" was originally released as a single from Forever, Michael in a limited number of territories. It was later released worldwide in 1981 as the lead single from the eponymous 1981 compilation and charted in all territories for the first time from this reissue.)	1981	55	9	—	—	—	1	48	—	—	1	UK: 790,000	BPI: Gold	One Day in Your Life
"The Girl Is Mine" (with Paul McCartney)	1982	2	4	8	—	53	12	3	1	—	8	US: 1,300,000	RIAA: Platinum; BPI: Silver; MC: Gold; RMNZ: Platinum	Thriller
"Billie Jean"	1983	1	1	1	1	2	2	2	1	1	1	UK: 1,440,000	RIAA: Platinum; RIAA: Diamond (Digital); RIAA: Gold (Mastertone); ARIA: 9× Platinum; BPI: 6× Platinum; BVMI: 2× Platinum; MC: Diamond; RMNZ: 8× Platinum; SNEP: Platinum	Thriller
"Beat It"	1983	1	2	1	2	2	1	1	1	2	3		RIAA: Platinum; RIAA: 8× Platinum (Digital); RIAA: Gold (Mastertone); ARIA: Platinum; BPI: 4× Platinum; BVMI: 3× Gold; MC: 6× Platinum; RMNZ: 5× Platinum; SNEP: Platinum	Thriller
"Wanna Be Startin' Somethin'"	1983	5	25	1	14	16	1	35	—	30	8		RIAA: Platinum; BPI: Platinum; MC: Platinum; RMNZ: Platinum	Thriller
"Human Nature"	1983	7	63	11	36	49	14	7	84	15	6 (Note: "Human Nature" was not released in the UK as a single from Thriller. It peaked at number 6 there in 2026 after the release of Michael.)		RIAA: Platinum; BPI: Platinum; MC: Platinum; RMNZ: 2× Platinum	Thriller
"P.Y.T. (Pretty Young Thing)"	1983	10	40	17	15	51	13	22	—	92	11		RIAA: 4× Platinum; BPI: Platinum; MC: 2× Platinum; RMNZ: 2× Platinum	Thriller
"Thriller"	1983	2	3	3	1	9	3	3	1	3	5	US: 4,024,398; WW: 9,000,000	RIAA: Platinum; RIAA: Diamond (Digital); RIAA: Gold (Mastertone); ARIA: 6× Platinum; BPI: 3× Platinum; BVMI: Gold; MC: 6× Platinum; RMNZ: 3× Platinum; SNEP: Platinum	Thriller
"Farewell My Summer Love"	1984	38	68	46	—	51	—	35	—	—	7			Farewell My Summer Love
"Girl You're So Together"	1984	—	—	—	—	—	—	—	—	—	33			Farewell My Summer Love
"I Just Can't Stop Loving You" (with Siedah Garrett)	1987	1	10	2	12	2	1	1	5	2	1	UK: 464,000	RIAA: Gold; BPI: Gold; MC: Gold; RMNZ: Gold	Bad
"Bad"	1987	1	4	5	4	4	1	1	1	3	3	UK: 491,000	RIAA: Platinum; ARIA: Platinum; BPI: Platinum; BVMI: Gold; MC: 2× Platinum; RMNZ: Platinum; SNEP: Silver	Bad
"The Way You Make Me Feel"	1987	1	5	7	29	12	6	2	1	8	3	UK: 645,000	RIAA: 2× Platinum; ARIA: Gold; BPI: 2× Platinum; MC: 3× Platinum; RMNZ: 3× Platinum	Bad
"Man in the Mirror"	1988	1	8	3	—	23	16	4	11	22	2 (Note: "Man in the Mirror" originally peaked at number 21 in the UK upon its release as a single. It reached number two in 2009 off of digital downloads following Jackson's death.)		RIAA: 3× Platinum; BPI: 3× Platinum; BVMI: Gold; MC: 3× Platinum; RMNZ: 3× Platinum	Bad
"Dirty Diana"	1988	1	27	5	9	3	2	5	1	3	4		RIAA: Platinum; BPI: 2× Platinum; BVMI: Gold; MC: Platinum; RMNZ: Platinum	Bad
"Another Part of Me"	1988	11	44	28	32	10	10	14	31	5	15			Bad
"Smooth Criminal"	1988	7	16	—	4	9	1	29	1	5	8	UK: 614,000	RIAA: 2× Platinum; BPI: 2× Platinum; BVMI: Gold; RMNZ: 3× Platinum; SNEP: Silver	Bad
"Leave Me Alone"	1989	—	37	—	17	16	6	9	1	10	2		BPI: Silver	Bad
"Liberian Girl"	1989	—	50	—	15	23	15	31	—	12	13		BPI: Silver	Bad
"Black or White"	1991	1	1	1	1	2	3	1	1	1	1		RIAA: 3× Platinum; ARIA: 2× Platinum; BPI: Platinum; BVMI: Gold; MC: 3× Platinum; RMNZ: 2× Platinum; SNEP: Silver	Dangerous
"Remember the Time"	1992	3	6	2	5	8	3	1	2	4	3		RIAA: 3× Platinum; ARIA: Gold; BPI: Platinum; MC: Platinum; RMNZ: 2× Platinum	Dangerous
"In the Closet"	1992	6	5	16	9	15	9	5	2	25	8		RIAA: Gold; ARIA: Gold	Dangerous
"Jam"	1992	26	11	29	8	18	9	2	1	22	13			Dangerous
"Who Is It"	1992	14	34	6	8	9	15	16	19	14	10			Dangerous
"Heal the World"	1992	27	20	21	1	3	6	3	1	5	2		ARIA: Gold; BPI: Gold; BVMI: Gold; MC: Gold; RMNZ: Gold; SNEP: Silver	Dangerous
"Give In to Me"	1993	—	4	—	7	10	3	1	6	7	2		ARIA: Gold; RMNZ: Gold	Dangerous
"Will You Be There"	1993	7	42	6	29	12	3	2	—	3	9		RIAA: Platinum; BPI: Silver; MC: Gold; RMNZ: Gold	Dangerous
"Gone Too Soon"	1993	—	76	—	32	45	31	6	—	33	33			Dangerous
"Scream" (Note: "Scream"/"Childhood" was released as a double A-side single, with the songs listed together in most charts but separately in Canada.) (with Janet Jackson)	1995	5	2	5	4	8	3	1	1	3	3		RIAA: Platinum; ARIA: Gold; BPI: Silver; RMNZ: Gold	HIStory: Past, Present and Future, Book I
"Childhood"	1995	5	2	73	4	8	3	1	1	3	3		RIAA: Platinum; ARIA: Gold; BPI: Silver; RMNZ: Gold	HIStory: Past, Present and Future, Book I
"You Are Not Alone"	1995	1	7	11	1	4	6	1	1	1	1		RIAA: Platinum; ARIA: Platinum; BPI: Platinum; BVMI: Gold; IFPI SWI: Gold; MC: Platinum; RMNZ: Platinum; SNEP: Gold	HIStory: Past, Present and Future, Book I
"Earth Song" (Note: Not released in the United States)	1995	—	15	40	2	1	4	4	1	1	1	UK: 1,270,000	RIAA: Gold; BPI: 2× Platinum; BVMI: 2× Platinum; IFPI SWI: Platinum; MC: Gold; RMNZ: Gold; SNEP: Gold	HIStory: Past, Present and Future, Book I
"They Don't Care About Us"	1996	30	16	—	4	1	4	9	2	3	4		RIAA: Gold; ARIA: Gold; BPI: Platinum; BVMI: 3× Gold; MC: Platinum; RMNZ: 2× Platinum; SNEP: Gold	HIStory: Past, Present and Future, Book I
"Stranger in Moscow"	1996	91	14	—	18	21	9	6	1	5	4		BPI: Silver	HIStory: Past, Present and Future, Book I
"Blood on the Dance Floor"	1997	42	5	4	10	5	4	1	1	5	1	UK: 207,700	ARIA: Gold; BPI: Silver; BVMI: Gold	Blood on the Dance Floor: HIStory in the Mix
"HIStory" (Note: "HIStory"/"Ghosts" was released as a double A-side single.)	1997	—	43	—	26	14	16	29	4	16	5			Blood on the Dance Floor: HIStory in the Mix
"Ghosts"	1997	—	43	—	26	14	16	29	4	16	5			Blood on the Dance Floor: HIStory in the Mix
"You Rock My World" (Note: Not released for sale in the United States; released only to radio in the United States.)	2001	10	4	2	1	6	3	13	1	5	2		RIAA: Gold; ARIA: Gold; BPI: Platinum; MC: Platinum; RMNZ: 2× Platinum; SNEP: Gold	Invincible
"Cry"	2001	—	43	—	30	76	42	—	6	42	25			Invincible
"One More Chance"	2003	83	—	—	44	29	23	—	7	24	5			Number Ones
"The Girl Is Mine 2008" (with will.i.am)	2008	—	60	76	22	21	17	—	—	47	32			Thriller 25
"Wanna Be Startin' Somethin' 2008" (with Akon)	2008	81	8	32	10	63	48	4	—	—	69		ARIA: Gold; RMNZ: Gold	Thriller 25
"Mind Is the Magic"	2010	—	—	—	80	—	—	—	—	—	—			Mind Is the Magic: Anthem for the Las Vegas Show
"Hold My Hand" (with Akon)	2010	39	37	16	27	7	28	6	7	9	10		RIAA: Gold; BPI: Silver; BVMI: Gold; PROMUSICAE: Gold; MC: Platinum; RMNZ: Gold	Michael
"Hollywood Tonight"	2011	—	—	—	—	55	54	—	—	—	152			Michael
"Behind the Mask"	2011	—	—	—	—	—	—	—	—	—	191			Michael
"(I Like) The Way You Love Me"	2011	—	—	—	—	—	—	—	—	—	—			Michael
"Love Never Felt So Good" (solo or with Justin Timberlake)	2014	9	28	20	2	18	11	12	6	15	8	US: 1,100,000	RIAA: Platinum (Digital); BPI: Platinum; BVMI: Platinum; MC: 2× Platinum; RMNZ: 2× Platinum	Xscape
"A Place with No Name"	2014	—	—	—	93	—	45	—	—	—	172			Xscape
"Don't Matter to Me" (with Drake)	2018	9	3	4	19	16	13	6	33	5	2		ARIA: Gold; BPI: Platinum; MC: Gold	Scorpion
"—" denotes releases that did not chart

== As featured artist ==
List of singles as featured artist, with chart positions and certifications, showing year released and album name
Title	Year	Peak chart positions										Certifications	Album
Title	Year	US	AUS	CAN	FRA	GER	NL	NZ	SPN	SWI	UK	Certifications	Album
"Save Me" (with Dave Mason)	1980	71	—	—	—	—	—	—	—	—	—		Old Crest on a New Wave
"Say Say Say" (with Paul McCartney)	1983	1	4	1	2	12	4	1	1	2	2	RIAA: Platinum; BPI: Silver; MC: Platinum; SNEP: Gold	Pipes of Peace
"Get It" (with Stevie Wonder)	1987	80	—	—	49	—	14	—	19	—	37		Characters
"2300 Jackson Street" (with The Jacksons, Janet Jackson, Rebbie Jackson, and Marlon Jackson)	1989	—	—	—	—	—	48	—	—	—	76		2300 Jackson Street
"Whatzupwitu" (with Eddie Murphy)	1993	— (Note: "Whatzupwitu" did not enter the Billboard Hot 100, but peaked at number 21 on the Billboard Bubbling Under Hot 100 chart.)	88	—	36	—	—	—	—	—	—		Love's Alright
"Why" (with 3T)	1996	— (Note: "Why" did not enter the Billboard Hot 100, but peaked at number 12 on the Bubbling Under Hot 100 chart.)	46	—	9	29	10	9	—	11	2	SNEP: Gold	Brotherhood
"All in Your Name" (with Barry Gibb)	2011	—	—	—	—	—	—	—	—	—	—		Non-album singles
"Say Say Say" (with Kygo and Paul McCartney)	2023	—	—	—	—	—	—	38	—	—	—		Non-album singles
"—" denotes releases that did not chart

== Other appearances ==
List of other appearances, with chart positions, sales and certifications, showing year released and album name
Title	Year	Peak chart positions										Sales	Certifications	Album
Title	Year	US	AUS	CAN	FRA	GER	NL	NZ	SPN	SWI	UK	Sales	Certifications	Album
"Night Time Lover" (with La Toya Jackson)	1980	—	—	—	—	—	—	—	—	—	—			La Toya Jackson
"Muscles" (with Diana Ross)	1982	10	50	18	—	69	10	18	12	—	15			Silk Electric
"State of Independence" (with Donna Summer & Friends)	1982	41	—	—	—	—	1	—	—	—	14			Donna Summer
"Somebody's Watching Me" (with Rockwell)	1984	2	12	2	5	2	2	5	1	3	6		RIAA: Gold; RIAA: Gold (Digital); MC: Gold	Somebody's Watching Me
"Don't Stand Another Chance" (with Janet Jackson)	1984	— (Note: "Don't Stand Another Chance" did not enter the Billboard Hot 100, but peaked at top on the Bubbling Under Hot 100 chart.)	—	—	—	—	—	—	—	—	—			Dream Street
"Centipede" (with Rebbie Jackson & The Weather Girls)	1984	24	97	—	—	—	—	4	—	—	—		RIAA: Gold	Centipede
"We Are the World" (as a member of USA for Africa)	1985	1	1	1	1	2	1	1	1	1	1	US: 8,000,000	RIAA: 4× Platinum; BPI: Silver; MC: 3× Platinum; RMNZ: Platinum; SNEP: Platinum	We Are the World
"Eaten Alive" (with Diana Ross)	1985	77	81	79	—	38	26	26	—	17	71			Eaten Alive
"Do the Bartman" (Note: Not released as a single in the United States) (with The Simpsons)	1990	—	1	14	—	5	2	1	2	12	1		ARIA: Gold; BPI: Gold; RMNZ: Gold	The Simpsons Sing the Blues
"State of Independence (Remix)" (with Donna Summer & Friends)	1996	—	—	—	—	—	—	—	—	—	13			Donna Summer
"I Need You" (with 3T)	1996	—	17	—	5	22	5	30	—	9	3		ARIA: Gold; SNEP: Gold; BPI: Silver	Brotherhood
"We Are the World 25 for Haiti" (as a member of Artists for Haiti)	2010	2	—	7	—	—	—	8	15	—	50			Non-album single
"Low" (with Lenny Kravitz)	2018	—	—	—	21	61	—	—	—	69	—			Raise Vibration
"—" denotes releases that did not chart

== Promotional or limited release ==
List of promotional or limited release appearances, with chart positions, showing year released, certifications and album name
Title	Year	Peak chart positions										Certifications	Album
Title	Year	US	AUS	CAN	FRA	GER	NL	NZ	SPN	SWI	UK	Certifications	Album
"Maria (You Were the Only One)"	1972	—	—	—	—	—	—	—	—	62	—		Got to Be There
"Too Young"	1973	—	—	—	—	—	—	—	—	—	—		Music & Me
"Doggin' Around"	1974	—	—	—	—	—	—	—	—	—	—		Music & Me
"Someone in the Dark"	1982	—	—	—	—	—	—	—	—	—	—		E.T. the Extra-Terrestrial
"The Lady in My Life"	1982	—	—	—	—	—	—	—	—	—	—	RIAA: Gold	Thriller
"Touch the One You Love"	1984	—	—	—	—	—	—	—	—	—	—		Farewell My Summer Love
"Tell Me I'm Not Dreamin' (Too Good to Be True)" (with Jermaine Jackson)	1984	— (Note: Although it was never officially released as a single because of legal difficulties between Michael's label, Epic, and Jermaine's label, Arista, the song peaked at the top of the Billboard Hot Dance Club Play chart.)	—	—	—	—	—	—	—	—	—		Jermaine Jackson/Dynamite
"Twenty-Five Miles"	1987	—	—	—	—	—	—	—	—	—	—		The Original Soul of Michael Jackson
"Speed Demon"	1989	—	—	—	—	—	—	—	—	—	—		Bad
"Someone Put Your Hand Out"	1992	—	—	—	—	—	—	—	—	—	119		Non-album singles
"Black or White" (The Clivillés & Cole Remixes)	1992	—	18	—	—	—	—	—	—	—	14		Non-album singles
"Dangerous"	1993	—	—	—	—	99	—	—	—	78	—		Dangerous
"This Time Around" (with The Notorious B.I.G.)	1995	—	—	—	—	—	—	—	—	—	—		HIStory: Past, Present and Future, Book I
"Scream (David Morales Remix)" (with Janet Jackson)	1995	—	—	—	—	—	—	—	—	—	43		Non-album single
"On the Line"	1997	—	—	—	—	—	—	—	—	—	—		Ghosts – Deluxe Collector Box Set
"Is It Scary"	1997	—	—	—	—	—	—	—	—	—	—		Blood on the Dance Floor: HIStory in the Mix
"Smile"	1997	—	56	—	—	71	—	—	—	70	74		HIStory: Past, Present and Future, Book I
"Speechless"	2001	—	—	—	—	—	—	—	—	—	—		Invincible
"Butterflies"	2001	14	—	—	—	—	—	—	—	—	—		Invincible
"Heaven Can Wait"	2001	—	—	—	—	—	—	—	—	—	—	RMNZ: Gold	Invincible
"Unbreakable"	2002	—	—	—	—	—	—	—	—	—	—		Invincible
"What More Can I Give" (with the All Stars)	2003	—	—	—	—	—	—	—	—	—	—		Non-album singles
"Todo Para Ti" (with the All Stars)	2003	—	—	—	—	—	—	—	—	—	—		Non-album singles
"Cheater"	2004	—	—	—	—	—	—	—	—	—	—		The Ultimate Collection
"Beat It 2008" (with Fergie)	2008	—	—	77	—	—	—	—	—	26	177		Thriller 25
"Billie Jean 2008" (with Kanye West)	2008	—	—	—	—	—	—	—	—	—	183		Thriller 25
"Thriller Megamix"	2008	—	80	—	—	—	—	—	—	—	96		King of Pop
"This Is It"	2009	— (Note: "This Is It" did not enter the Billboard Hot 100, but peaked at number 18 on the Bubbling Under Hot 100 chart.)	—	56	—	—	22	—	18	—	—		Michael Jackson's This Is It
"Breaking News" (Note: On August 23, 2018, it was reported that Sony had admitted in court that the vocals on the three Cascio tracks were not performed by Jackson and were instead recorded after his death by Jason Malachi, apparently missing the first part of Sony's counsel sentence "[F]or purposes of the argument" which is used in court not to be an admission, but rather a statement of "even if the alleged action happened". However, the next day, Zia Modabber of Sony Music's law firm, Katten Muchin Rosenman, recanted these reports, stating that "no one has conceded that Michael Jackson did not sing on the songs".)	2010	—	—	—	—	—	—	—	—	—	—		Michael
"Much Too Soon"	2010	—	—	—	—	—	—	—	—	—	—		Michael
"(I Can't Make It) Another Day" (with Lenny Kravitz)	2010	—	—	—	—	—	—	—	—	—	—		Michael
"Monster" (with 50 Cent)	2010	—	—	—	—	—	—	—	—	—	197		Michael
"Keep Your Head Up"	2010	—	—	—	—	—	—	—	—	—	—		Michael
"Immortal Megamix"	2011	—	41	—	—	—	—	—	—	—	—		Immortal
"You Are Not Alone/I Just Can't Stop Loving You (Immortal Version)"	2011	—	—	—	—	—	—	—	—	—	—		Immortal
"Wanna Be Startin' Somethin' (Immortal Version)"	2011	—	—	—	—	—	—	—	—	—	—		Immortal
"I'll Be There (Immortal Version)"	2011	—	—	—	—	—	—	—	—	—	—		Immortal
"Dancing Machine/Blame It on the Boogie (Immortal Version)"	2011	—	—	—	—	—	—	—	—	—	—		Immortal
"This Place Hotel/Smooth Criminal/Dangerous (Immortal Version)"	2011	—	—	—	—	—	—	—	—	—	—		Immortal
"Is It Scary/Threatened/Thriller (Immortal Version)"	2011	—	—	—	—	—	—	—	—	—	—		Immortal
"Don't Be Messin' 'Round"	2012	—	—	—	—	—	—	—	—	—	—		Bad 25
"Bad (Afrojack Remix) (DJ Buddha Edit)" (with Pitbull)	2012	—	—	—	—	—	—	—	—	—	—		Bad 25
"I'm So Blue"	2012	—	—	—	—	—	—	—	—	—	—		Bad 25
"Chicago"	2014	26	—	38	127	66	53	—	—	41	—	BPI: Platinum; RMNZ: 2× Platinum	Xscape
"Loving You"	2014	—	—	—	—	—	—	24	—	—	—		Xscape
"Slave to the Rhythm"	2014	45	—	—	119	—	48	—	—	—	98		Xscape
"Do You Know Where Your Children Are"	2014	—	—	—	191	—	—	62	—	—	—		Xscape
"Blue Gangsta"	2014	—	—	—	—	—	—	77	—	—	—		Xscape
"There Must Be More to Life Than This" (with Queen and William Orbit)	2014	—	—	—	—	—	—	—	—	—	—		Queen Forever
"Blood on the Dance Floor x Dangerous" (The White Panda Mash-Up)	2017	—	—	—	—	—	—	—	—	—	—		Scream
"Thriller" (Steve Aoki Midnight Hour Remix)	2017	—	—	—	—	—	—	—	—	—	—		Non-album singles
"Diamonds Are Invincible" (Mark Ronson Mash-Up)	2018	—	—	—	—	—	—	—	—	—	—		Non-album singles
"—" denotes releases that did not chart

== See also ==
- Michael Jackson albums discography
- Michael Jackson videography
- List of songs recorded by Michael Jackson
- List of unreleased songs recorded by Michael Jackson
- The Jackson 5 discography
- List of artists who reached number one in the United States
- List of Billboard number-one dance club songs
- List of artists by total number of UK number one singles
- List of artists who reached number one on the U.S. dance chart
