= Chicago (Michael Jackson song) =

2014 promotional single by Michael Jackson

Promotional single by Michael Jackson

from the album Xscape
- Released: May 5, 2014
- Recorded: 1999 (original) 2010-2014 (reworked)
- Studio: The Hit Factory (New York City)
- Genre: Original: R&B; quiet storm; Reworked: funk; electro-pop; trap
- Length: 4:05; 4:43 (original)
- Label: MJJ; Epic
- Songwriter: Cory Rooney
- Producers: Michael Jackson; Cory Rooney; Timbaland; Jerome "J-Roc" Harmon

Michael Jackson promotional singles chronology
"I'm So Blue" (2012)	"Chicago" (2014)	"Loving You" (2014)

Licensed audio
- "Chicago" on YouTube

"Chicago" is a song by American singer Michael Jackson. The song was originally written by Cory Rooney under the title "She Was Lovin' Me". Jackson recorded the track at the Hit Factory recording studio in New York City during the Invincible album sessions between late March and mid-April 1999.

The track was ultimately not selected for Invincible and remained unreleased and unheard by the public for 15 years. Following Jackson's death, Rooney collaborated with his nephew, Taryll Jackson, on a new production in 2010.

In 2014, the track was reworked yet again, this time by producer Timbaland. The Timbaland version of the track was ultimately included on Jackson's second posthumous album, Xscape, under the title "Chicago". Nine months before Xscape was officially released, Timbaland said that "Chicago" was going to be the project's lead single, but "Love Never Felt So Good" went on to be the lead single instead.

On June 6, 2026, the song entered the Billboard Hot 100 for the first time at number 30, and peaked at 26 the following week. This was largely due to the release of the biopic Michael renewing interest in Jackson's catalogue, in addition to the song being featured in the viral animation video "Birds for Some Reason". Jackson became the first artist to have a new Hot 100 entry in each decade since the 1970s.

== Release ==
The song was released on May 5, 2014, on Sony Entertainment Network as a promotional single for promoting Xscape.

The song's "Papercha$er" remix was made available for select Sony customers through Xperia Lounge and Music Unlimited as a bonus track on the standard edition of the Xscape album.

== Composition ==
The track was produced by Timbaland and features a deep-bass groove and elements of contemporary funk. Jackson narrates a story about meeting a woman in Chicago. It features a mix of smooth and anguished vocals, highlighting the woman's conflicting statement of being without a man yet having a family, with the urgent refrain of a lyric "lie to you, lie to me".

== Charts ==
=== Weekly charts ===
2014 weekly chart performance
Chart (2014)	Peak position
France (SNEP)	127
Netherlands (Single Top 100)	53
South Korea (Gaon)	103
South Korea International (Gaon)	7
US Hot R&B/Hip-Hop Songs (Billboard)	50

2026 weekly chart performance
Chart (2026)	Peak position
Austria (Ö3 Austria Top 40)	75
Brazil Hot 100 (Billboard)	73
Canada Hot 100 (Billboard)	38
France (SNEP)	200
Germany (GfK)	66
Global 200 (Billboard)	18
Greece International (IFPI)	41
Lithuania (AGATA)	54
Norway (IFPI Norge)	52
Panama Streaming (PRODUCE)	126
Portugal (AFP)	119
Romania (Billboard)	18
Slovakia Singles Digital (ČNS IFPI)	89
Sweden (Sverigetopplistan)	68
Switzerland (Schweizer Hitparade)	41
United Arab Emirates (IFPI)	15
UK Audio Streaming (Official Charts)	40
US Billboard Hot 100	26
US Hot R&B/Hip-Hop Songs (Billboard)	9

=== Monthly charts ===
Monthly chart performance
Chart (2026)	Peak position
Panama Streaming (PRODUCE)	148

== Certifications ==
Region	Certification	Certified units/sales
Denmark (IFPI Danmark)	Gold	45,000^{‡}
New Zealand (RMNZ)	2× Platinum	60,000^{‡}
United Kingdom (BPI)	Platinum	600,000^{‡}
Streaming
Greece (IFPI Greece)	Gold	1,000,000^{†}
^{‡} Sales+streaming figures based on certification alone.^{†} Streaming-only figures based on certification alone.

== See also ==
- List of unreleased songs recorded by Michael Jackson
- List of music released posthumously
