= A Place with No Name =

Single by Michael Jackson

from the album Xscape
- Released: August 12, 2014
- Recorded: 1998
- Studio: Original sessions: Record Plant (Los Angeles, California); Record One (Los Angeles, California); Marvin's Room (Los Angeles, California); The Hit Factory (New York City, New York); Neverland Ranch (Los Olivos, California); Michael Jackson's Las Vegas mansion (Las Vegas, Nevada); Reworked: Downtown Studios (New York City); Jungle City (New York City)
- Genre: Synth-funk
- Length: 3:58 (single version); 5:35 (album version); 4:57 (original cut version); 5:18 (original uncut version)
- Label: Epic; MJJ
- Songwriters: Michael Jackson; Elliot "Dr. Freeze" Straite; Lee Martin Bunnell
- Producers: Michael Jackson; Dr. Freeze; Stargate

Michael Jackson singles chronology
| "Love Never Felt So Good" (2014) | "A Place with No Name" (2014) | "Blood on the Dance Floor x Dangerous" (2017) |

Music video
- "A Place with No Name" on YouTube

"A Place with No Name" is a song by American singer Michael Jackson released on the second posthumous Jackson album, Xscape (2014). A 24-second snippet was released by website TMZ on July 16, 2009, three weeks after Jackson's death. The full version leaked online on December 3, 2013. The track is based on "A Horse with No Name", the hit 1972 song by rock band America. At the time of the leak, America stated that they were "honored" that Jackson chose to sample their work.

It was claimed that there were "dozens and dozens" of unreleased Jackson songs that could be issued for several years to come. The song was contemporized by Norwegian producers Stargate for Xscape, along with the original version. "A Place with No Name" was released to American urban adult contemporary radio on August 12, 2014.

== Background ==
On June 25, 2009, Jackson died following what was initially reported as a cardiac arrest. However, later on it was determined that Jackson died of a drug overdose of propofol and lorazepam and his death was ruled a homicide. On July 16, 2009, celebrity news website TMZ—the first media outlet to report the death—released a 24-second snippet of an unreleased Jackson song, "A Place with No Name". The track is based on America's 1972 number-one single "A Horse with No Name". Jackson had legal permission to use the song. The St. Louis Post-Dispatch stated that the two songs were "just about identical". It was not known at the time of the leak when the track was recorded, although Jackson and America shared a manager—believed to be Jim Morey—in the late 1980s and late 1990s.

According to producer Dr. Freeze, the version of "A Place with No Name" that leaked is the final version Jackson heard and approved in 2008, which is credited as the original version in the deluxe edition of Xscape.

== Music videos ==
On August 13, 2014, "A Place with No Name" marks the first time a music video has ever debuted exclusively on Twitter. Along with its tweet premiere, "A Place with No Name" was also shown on the Sony video screen in Times Square on Wednesday night at 10 p.m. It was uploaded to Michael Jackson's VEVO page the following day. In line with the desert theme featured in the lyrics of America's "A Horse with No Name", the video stars dancers Alvester Martin, who worked with Jackson for ten years, and Danielle Acoff in new dance sequences in a desert. Also featured are rare clips from Jackson's "In the Closet" video shoot. The music video was directed by Samuel Bayer.

A second music video was released on Michael Jackson's VEVO page on August 28, 2014, with choreographed dances performed by the dancers from Cirque du Soleil's Michael Jackson: One world tour. It was filmed at different places in Los Angeles, but most of the video was shot inside the "Michael Jackson: ONE" Boutique inside Mandalay Bay.

== Critical reception ==
"A Place with No Name" (intro)
Michael Jackson's "A Place with No Name" has been said to have the same beat and sound as "Leave Me Alone".

Joe Levy from Billboard called the song the "centerpiece" of the album. Meggie Morris from Renowned for Sound called the track "unknown and at the same time familiar, producing a sound that is retro and classic, rather than dated." However, Nekesa Mumbi Moody from Yahoo! said "A Place with No Name" "has the same beat and sound as 'Leave Me Alone' from the Bad era and is lyrically weak: we can tell why Jackson left it on the cutting room floor".

=== Response from America ===
Dewey Bunnell and Gerry Beckley—two members of America —conveyed their gratitude for Jackson choosing "A Horse with No Name" as a template for "A Place with No Name". In their statement to MTV, the musicians also expressed regret that Jackson's fans did not get to hear the finished version while Jackson was alive.

We're honored that Michael Jackson chose to record it and we're impressed with the quality of the track. We're also hoping it will be released soon so that music listeners around the world can hear the whole song and once again experience the incomparable brilliance of Michael Jackson [...] Michael Jackson really did it justice and we truly hope his fans—and our fans—get to hear it in its entirety. It's really poignant.

Bunnell further commented that he was "very proud of the fact that [Jackson] recorded it. It's a good version and an interesting derivative of the original that I wrote." Bunnel said that he and Beckley were "in the dark" regarding the future of Jackson's unreleased material.

== Track listing ==
Digital download / CD single
| No. | Title | Writer(s) | Producer(s) | Length |
|---|---|---|---|---|
| 1. | "A Place with No Name" (single version) | Michael Jackson; Elliot "Dr. Freeze" Straite; Lee Martin Bunnell | Stargate; Jackson^{[a]}; Freeze^{[a]} | 3:58 |
| 2. | "A Place with No Name" (album version) | Jackson; Straite; Bunnell | Stargate; Jackson^{[a]}; Freeze^{[a]} | 5:35 |
| 3. | "Slave to the Rhythm" (Audien remix radio edit) | Antonio Reid; Kenneth Edmonds; Daryl Simmons; Kevin Roberson | Timbaland; J-Roc^{[b]}; Reid^{[a]}; Edmonds^{[a]}; Jackson^{[a]}; Audien^{[c]} | 3:15 |

Notes

- ^{^[a]} signifies a vocal producer
- ^{^[b]} signifies a co-producer
- ^{^[c]} signifies an additional producer

== Charts ==
=== Weekly charts ===
Weekly chart performance for "A Place with No Name"
| Chart (2014) | Peak position |
|---|---|
| Belgium (Ultratip Bubbling Under Flanders) | 5 |
| Belgium (Ultratip Bubbling Under Wallonia) | 19 |
| France (SNEP) | 93 |
| Hungary (Rádiós Top 40) | 9 |
| Hungary (Single Top 40) | 22 |
| Netherlands (Single Top 100) | 24 |

=== Year-end charts ===
Year-end chart performance for "A Place with No Name"
| Chart (2014) | Position |
|---|---|
| Hungary (Rádiós Top 40) | 54 |

== See also ==
- List of unreleased songs recorded by Michael Jackson
- Death of Michael Jackson
- List of music released posthumously
