= Dr. Freeze =

American songwriter

- Born: Elliot Straite; June 23, 1970 (age 56); Brooklyn, New York
- Education: Berklee College of Music
- Occupations: Singer-songwriter, record producer
- Years active: 1990 - present

Elliot Straite, also known by his pseudonym Dr. Freeze, is an American singer, songwriter and record producer. His songs are mostly in the new jack swing style.

He wrote and produced the hit song "I Wanna Sex You Up" by R&B boy band Color Me Badd, wrote and produced "Poison" by Bell Biv DeVoe, and co-wrote and co-produced "Break of Dawn" for Michael Jackson's album Invincible.

== Unreleased tracks ==
- "Friday Night" by Dr. Freeze (1999, Michael Jackson considered the song for his Invincible album but decided not to include the track for time)
- "Magic" by Dr. Freeze (2004/05, pitched to Michael Jackson but rejected)
- "Where Is the Love?" by Dr. Freeze (2004/05, pitched to Michael Jackson but rejected)

== As songwriter ==
- "Poison" by Bell Biv DeVoe (1990)
- "Poison" (12") Dennis Brown & Brian & Tony Gold Greensleeves Records (1990)
- "I Got the Feeling" by Today (1990)
- "Rock 'N Dance" (CD, Comp) V.A. Quality Music (1990)
- "I'm Back" (7") Red Bandit Motown (1990)
- "Over Proof" Dennis Brown Greensleeves Records (1990)
- "She's Dope!" by Bell Biv Devoe (1990)
- "Spydermann" from the album Coolin' at the Playground Ya Know! by Another Bad Creation (1991)
- "I Wanna Sex You Up" and "Color Me Badd" from the album C.M.B. by Color Me Badd (1991)
- "The Mac" from the Jennifer Love Hewitt film Can't Hardly Wait (1998)
- "Break of Dawn" from the album Invincible by Michael Jackson (2001)
- "A Place with No Name" and "Blue Gangsta" from the album Xscape by Michael Jackson (2014)

== Awards and nominations ==
Year	Nominee / work	Award	Result	Ref.
1992	"I Wanna Sex You Up"	Grammy Award for Best Rhythm & Blues Song	Nominated	
