= Blue Gangsta =

Song by Michael Jackson

from the album Xscape
- Released: May 9, 2014
- Recorded: 1998–1999 (original recording); 2013–2014 (reworked)
- Genre: R&B; trap; gangsta rap
- Length: 4:17 (album version); 4:24 (original version)
- Label: Epic; MJJ
- Songwriters: Michael Jackson; Dr. Freeze
- Producers: Michael Jackson; Dr. Freeze; Timbaland; Jerome "J-Roc" Harmon; Daniel Jones; King Solomon Logan

Music video
- "Blue Gangsta" on YouTube

"Blue Gangsta" is a song by American singer and recording artist Michael Jackson. The song is the 7th track of Jackson's second posthumous album Xscape. The song was originally written, composed and produced by Jackson with additional music by Dr. Freeze during the Invincible album recording sessions in 1998–1999, and was re-tooled by Timbaland and Jerome "J-Roc" Harmon during the Xscape recording sessions in 2013–2014.

== Background and leak ==
The song was originally recorded between 1998 and 1999 for the Invincible album but failed to make the final cut. Dr. Freeze re-tooled the song without changing the original music to fit night clubs but this version was not featured on the Xscape album. In late 2010, a year after Jackson's passing, the full version of "Blue Gangsta" was leaked onto the internet. The original version of "Blue Gangsta" included on Xscape is an earlier version; engineer Michael Prince felt the decision to include this version didn't align with Jackson's vision for the song. The track seems to sample strings from Elmer Bernstein's 'Bumpy and The Queen', a song composed for the film Hoodlum, released in 1997.

Opening with a movie score-like wash of strings and the urgent refrain, "What cha gonna do/You ain't no friend of mine/Look what you put me through/Now that I'm the blue gangsta," the Timbaland-produced tune features a spare, skittering beat and Jackson singing over the multi-tracked chorus. Brazilian tribute artist and impersonator Rodrigo Teaser revealed in a podcast that LaVelle Smith Jr. (Jackson's long-time personal friend, choreographer and dancer), who had worked with Teaser, told him that the song would be the last part of a gangster-themed trilogy to be presented in live performances; the two previous parts being "Smooth Criminal" and "Dangerous".

== Release ==
The song was released on MTV on May 8, 2014.

== Music video ==
The music video was published on 14 May 2014 on Jackson's official YouTube channel. Inspired by the short film for Jackson's short video for "Smooth Criminal", dancers from Michael Jackson: The Immortal World Tour celebrated the release of Xscape with a music video choreographed to this single. A shortened edit of the 2010 leaked version was used to celebrate the original version of this song.

== Critical reception ==
Jon Blistein from Rolling Stone said that "The harrowing, hard-hitting 'Blue Gangsta' features a fiery vocal performance from Jackson, as well as updated production from Timbaland, who gives the track his signature futuristic spin, complete with snap-back snares, eerie low-end synths, blaring horns and striking strings."

Gil Kaufman from MTV said that "If 'Thriller' gave you the chills, wait til you get a shot of Michael Jackson's 'Blue Gangsta'. The song, which is available exclusively now at michaeljackson.mtv.com will appear on the upcoming posthumous King of Pop album, Xscape, and it is a classic slice of cinematic MJ pop magic."

== Charts ==
Chart performance for "Blue Gangsta"
Chart (2014)	Peak position
Netherlands (Single Top 100)	77
US Bubbling Under R&B/Hip-Hop Singles (Billboard)	8

== See also ==
- List of unreleased songs recorded by Michael Jackson
- Death of Michael Jackson
- List of music released posthumously
