= Do You Know Where Your Children Are (song) =

2014 promotional single by Michael Jackson

Promotional single by Michael Jackson

from the album Xscape
- Released: May 9, 2014
- Recorded: 1986–1990 (original); 2013–2014 (reworked)
- Studio: Hayvenhurst (Encino, California)
- Genre: R&B
- Length: 4:36 (album version); 4:39 (original version)
- Label: MJJ; Epic
- Songwriter: Michael Jackson
- Producers: Michael Jackson; Timbaland (album version); Jerome "J-Roc" Harmon (album version)

Michael Jackson promotional singles chronology
"Slave to the Rhythm" (2014)	"Do You Know Where Your Children Are" (2014)

Licensed audio
- "Do You Know Where Your Children Are" on YouTube

"Do You Know Where Your Children Are" is a song by American singer Michael Jackson, released as the sixth track on Jackson's second posthumous album, Xscape (2014).

== Background and recording ==
The song is titled after a public service announcement aired on US television from the 1960s to the '80s. According to a note left by Jackson, the song is "about kids being raised in a broken family where the father comes home drunk and the mother is out prostituting and the kids run away from home and they become victims of rape, prostitution and the hunter becomes the hunted". The song was originally recorded during the Bad recording sessions in 1986, and subsequently revisited during sessions for the Dangerous album in 1990.

== Charts ==
Chart performance for "Do You Know Where Your Children Are"
Chart (2014)	Peak position
Netherlands (Single Top 100)	62

== See also ==
- List of unreleased songs recorded by Michael Jackson
- Death of Michael Jackson
- List of music released posthumously
