= Slave to the Rhythm (Michael Jackson song) =

2014 promotional single by Michael Jackson

Promotional single by Michael Jackson

from the album Xscape
- Released: May 9, 2014
- Recorded: 1991 (original); 2013–2014 (reworked)
- Genre: R&B; synth-pop; electropop; new jack swing
- Length: 4:15 (album version); 4:35 (original version)
- Label: MJJ; Epic
- Songwriters: L.A. Reid; Babyface; Daryl Simmons; Kevin Roberson
- Producers: L.A. Reid; Babyface; Timbaland (album version); Jerome "J-Roc" Harmon (album version)

Michael Jackson promotional singles chronology
"Loving You" (2014)	"Slave to the Rhythm" (2014)	"Do You Know Where Your Children Are" (2014)

Music video
- "Slave to the Rhythm" on YouTube

"Slave to the Rhythm" is a song by American singer Michael Jackson. The song is the fifth track of Jackson's second posthumous album Xscape. The song appeared on several notable music charts due to digital downloads and streaming. Sony Mobile used a snippet of "Slave to the Rhythm" in their advertising campaign for the Xperia Z2 mobile phone. It was performed live at the 2014 Billboard Music Awards with a "Pepper's ghost" of Michael Jackson, advertised as a hologram. Due to streaming of the performance at the Billboard Music Awards, "Slave to the Rhythm" debuted at number 45 on the Billboard Hot 100, giving Jackson a posthumous 50th entry on the Billboard Hot 100.

== Background and leak ==
The song was written and recorded in 1991, with L.A. Reid and Babyface during sessions for the Dangerous album, but didn't make the final cut. In 2010, a version of the song remixed by Tricky Stewart was leaked. This remix remains unreleased officially, but a snippet was played on The Ellen DeGeneres Show in the weeks before the release of Xscape. In 2013, another version of the song leaked featuring Jackson's vocals in a duet with Canadian artist Justin Bieber. In response to criticism over this remix, the Michael Jackson Estate had not authorized release of this recording, and has since made attempts to remove the song from as many sites and YouTube channels as possible.

== Release ==
In February 2014, Sony and Jackson's estate announced a partnership with Sony Mobile that saw the release of an ad incorporating a new version of the track "Slave to the Rhythm", which had been confirmed as one of the album tracks. The re-tooled version was produced by Timbaland and J-Roc. The commercial advertisement was for the Sony Xperia Z2 mobile phone; both Xperia Z2 and M2 came with a copy of "Slave to the Rhythm", while users could download the rest of the album. The original version can be found on the deluxe edition of the Xscape album.

In 2014, a version of the song remixed by Audien was released. It was first premiered on USA Today and was part of Audien's setlist for the 2014 edition of the Tomorrowland festival.

== Live performance ==
On May 18, 2014, a Pepper's ghost (incorrectly referred to as a hologram) illusion of Michael Jackson performed "Slave to the Rhythm", for the 2014 Billboard Music Awards. The selection of the song "Slave to the Rhythm" for the performance was made in late 2013.

The Talauega brothers, Rich and Tone, were brought on right after New Year's Day, and they started to draw up dance moves for Jackson and for the other dancers in the film. The brothers' involvement with Jackson dates back to the 1995 MTV Video Music Awards; they also were backup dancers for the HIStory World Tour in 1997. Jamie King was brought in to direct the video, which was produced by Pulse Evolution and Tricycle Logic.

A day after the coverage, the live performance of "Slave to the Rhythm" was uploaded to Jackson's official YouTube channel.

== Charts ==
Chart performance for "Slave to the Rhythm"
Chart (2014)	Peak position
Canada Hot 100 (Billboard)	91
France (SNEP)	119
Netherlands (Single Top 100)	48
South Korea International Songs (Gaon)	4
UK Singles (OCC)	98
US Billboard Hot 100	45
US Hot R&B/Hip-Hop Songs (Billboard)	12

== See also ==
- List of unreleased songs recorded by Michael Jackson
- Death of Michael Jackson
- List of music released posthumously
