= Loving You (Michael Jackson song) =

2014 promotional single by Michael Jackson

Promotional single by Michael Jackson

from the album Xscape
- Released: May 6, 2014
- Recorded: July 1985 (original); 2013–2014 (reworked)
- Studio: Red Wing Studio (San Fernando, California)
- Genre: Smooth jazz (original); R&B (remake)
- Length: 3:15 (album version); 3:02 (original version)
- Label: Epic; MJJ
- Songwriter: Michael Jackson
- Producers: Michael Jackson; Timbaland; Jerome "J-Roc" Harmon

Michael Jackson promotional singles chronology
| "Chicago" (2014) | "Loving You" (2014) | "Slave to the Rhythm" (2014) |

Licensed audio
- "Loving You" on YouTube

"Loving You" is a song by American singer-songwriter Michael Jackson that was originally recorded before the Bad sessions in 1985, with the chorus section bearing notable similarities to "The Girl Is Mine". Matt Forger, one of Jackson's trusted engineers stated that, "It was a good song, just not in serious consideration for the album, Bad. One of many that were recorded and put away." A reworked version of the song was included on Jackson's posthumous album Xscape (2014).

== Release ==
The song made its debut on May 6, 2014 on Epic Records and was available streaming for Epic Unlimited members.

== Charts ==
Chart performance for "Loving You"
| Chart (2014) | Peak position |
|---|---|
| France (SNEP) | 99 |
| US Hot R&B Songs (Billboard) | 24 |
| US Bubbling Under R&B/Hip-Hop Singles (Billboard) | 2 |
| Netherlands (Single Top 100) | 42 |

== See also ==
- List of unreleased songs recorded by Michael Jackson
- Death of Michael Jackson
- List of music released posthumously
