= Xscape (album) =

- Standard edition cover

Compilation album by Michael Jackson
- Released: May 9, 2014
- Recorded: 1980–2001 (original songs); 2013–2014 (reworked songs)
- Studios: Hit Factory (New York City); Red Wing Studio (San Fernando, California); Record Plant (Los Angeles); Record One (Los Angeles); Marvin's Room (Los Angeles); Hayvenhurst (Encino, California); Sony (New York City)
- Genres: Pop; funk; R&B
- Length: 34:25 (standard); 38:30 (vinyl); 73:43 (deluxe)
- Labels: MJJ; Epic; Sony
- Producers: Michael Jackson; Paul Anka; Babyface; Dr. Freeze; J-Roc; Rodney Jerkins; Daniel Jones; King Solomon Logan; John McClain; L.A. Reid; Cory Rooney; Stargate; Timbaland; Giorgio Tuinfort

Michael Jackson chronology
Bad 25 (2012)	Xscape (2014)	Scream (2017)

Singles from Xscape
- 1. "Love Never Felt So Good" Released: May 2, 2014; 2. "A Place with No Name" Released: August 12, 2014

Xscape is a posthumous compilation album by the American singer-songwriter Michael Jackson. It was released on May 9, 2014, by Epic Records, MJJ Music and Sony Music Entertainment, four years after the release of Michael (2010). L.A. Reid, chairman of Epic Records, curated and served as executive producer for the album, enlisting Timbaland to lead a team of record producers, including Jerome "J-Roc" Harmon, Rodney Jerkins, Stargate, and John McClain, to remix and "contemporize" eight selected tracks, which were originally recorded between 1980 and 1999. The standard version of Xscape features the eight reworked tracks, while the deluxe version also includes the original versions of the songs, a bonus remix, and two videos.

The album was preceded by the release of its lead single, "Love Never Felt So Good", which includes a newly recorded version featuring Justin Timberlake. It reached number nine on the Billboard Hot 100 in the US, giving Jackson his first posthumous top ten and his first top ten since "You Rock My World" in 2001. "Love Never Felt So Good" became Jackson's highest-charting single on the Hot 100 since his final number one, "You Are Not Alone", in 1995. A second single, "A Place with No Name", was released later that year. Xscape was promoted across the Sony group of companies; Sony Mobile used a snippet of "Slave to the Rhythm" in their advertising campaign for the Xperia Z2 mobile phone. A Pepper's ghost illusion of Jackson performed "Slave to the Rhythm" at the 2014 Billboard Music Awards in May 2014.

Xscape was a global charting success and received generally positive reviews. It debuted at number two on the Billboard 200 and number one on the Billboard Top R&B/Hip-Hop Albums chart in the United States. It became Jackson's tenth UK number-one album after it debuted atop the UK Albums Chart. The album also debuted at number one in Belgium, Denmark, France, and Spain. Xscape was certified gold by the Recording Industry Association of America (RIAA) by the end of 2014.

== Background ==
Xscape was the second album of all new music released by Epic Records after Jackson's death in 2009. It was announced on March 31, 2014. It features eight tracks originally recorded between 1980 and 2001.

The title track "Xscape" was recorded in 1999 for Jackson's tenth studio album, Invincible. American producer Timbaland and Epic Records chairman and CEO L.A. Reid were executive producers, with additional production from Jerome "J-Roc" Harmon, Rodney Jerkins, Stargate and John McClain. Timbaland said that Reid had personally approached him at his home to discuss the new Jackson project. Jesse Johnson, former lead guitarist of the American band the Time worked on elements of a cover of "Hot Fun in the Summertime" that featured Mary J. Blige, Questlove, and D'Angelo. The track was ultimately not included on the album.

Reid said that they wanted to honor Jackson's legacy when naming the album: "The title of this album (Xscape) honors Michael's album naming process. He always chose a song from the album to name his projects and, beginning with Thriller, used only one word titles, each with an edgy quality to them (Thriller, Bad, Dangerous, HIStory and Invincible)."

== Recording history ==
"Love Never Felt So Good" was co-written by Canadian singer-songwriter Paul Anka and was originally recorded in 1980 as a demo with Anka on the piano. The song was also recorded by American entertainer Johnny Mathis. The duet version of the song with Justin Timberlake samples percussion and breaths from Jackson's 1979 song "Working Day and Night".

"Loving You" and "Do You Know Where Your Children Are" were recorded during the Bad sessions, the former in the mid-1980s and the latter in 1986.

"Slave to the Rhythm" was recorded during the Dangerous sessions in 1991. A version produced by Tricky Stewart leaked on the internet in 2010; it was slated for inclusion on Michael (2010). Justin Bieber also recorded a "duet version" featured with Jackson's vocals, which was leaked in August 2013. The Michael Jackson Estate stated that they had not authorized the release of this recording.

Four songs on the album were originally recorded for possible inclusion on Invincible (2001). "A Place with No Name" was written and recorded in 1998. The track is based on "A Horse with No Name", the 1972 single by American rock band America. A 24-second snippet was leaked online by TMZ in July 2009 and a full version was leaked in December 2013. "Blue Gangsta" was written and recorded in 1999. Rapper Tempamental remixed the song without Jackson's permission and made it available on his MySpace page in late 2006. The remix titled "Gangsta (No Friend of Mine)" featured Pras of the Fugees. "Chicago" (originally called "She Was Lovin' Me") was recorded in 1999. "Xscape" was written and recorded in 1999 and leaked on the internet in 2002. The song was reworked by its original producer, Rodney Jerkins, and features samples of "You Rock My World", a song recorded for the same album.

== Promotion and singles ==
In February 2014, Sony and Jackson's estate announced a partnership with Sony Mobile for a commercial advertisement for the Sony Xperia Z2 mobile phone. The ad incorporated a new version of the track "Slave to the Rhythm", which was the first song announced for the album. Prior to its release, the album was played for UK press in the basement of a Knightsbridge hotel on March 31, 2014. The journalists were permitted to hear the album once without any electronic devices, and song titles were kept secret. Pre-orders for Xscape in both standard and deluxe editions began on April 1, 2014.

On April 30, it was announced that "Love Never Felt So Good" would be the first single released from the album. It was unveiled at the iHeartRadio Music Awards The following day. It was co-written by Canadian singer-songwriter Paul Anka. The single was simultaneously released in two versions – a solo version and a duet version that features Justin Timberlake. The single became available on iTunes on May 2, 2014, and was released to urban radio stations on May 6, 2014. On May 4, the track "Chicago" became available to Music Unlimited subscribers, being followed by "Loving You", "A Place with No Name", "Slave to the Rhythm", and "Do You Know Where Your Children Are" in the succeeding days.

"Love Never Felt So Good" marked Jackson's 49th Hot 100 entry, peaking at number nine. Jackson became the first solo artist to have a single reach the top 10 in six different decades. A Pepper's ghost illusion of Michael Jackson performed "Slave to the Rhythm" at the 2014 Billboard Music Awards on May 18, 2014. The performance was choreographed by the Talauega brothers and was directed by Jamie King. A day after the coverage, the "live" performance of "Slave to the Rhythm" was uploaded to Jackson's VEVO YouTube channel. "Slave to the Rhythm" debuted at number 45 on the Billboard charts and became Jackson's 50th Hot 100 hit despite not having been released as a single.

The album was further promoted with the single release of "A Place with No Name" in August 2014.

== Critical reception ==
Professional ratings
Aggregate scores
Source	Rating
Metacritic	66/100
Review scores
Source	Rating
AllMusic	3.5/5 stars
Consequence of Sound	C
Entertainment Weekly	B
The Guardian	3/5 stars
The Independent	4/5 stars
Los Angeles Times	3.5/4 stars
Rolling Stone	3.5/4 stars
Slant Magazine	3/5 stars
The Sydney Morning Herald	3/5 stars

Xscape has a score of 66 out of 100 on Metacritic, based on 22 critics, indicating generally favorable reviews. Prior to the album release, Xscape was played for critics at exclusive album listening parties in New York City. Bernadette McNulty from The Daily Telegraph praised the album as pristine, noting the front-and-center presence of Jackson's voice in the mix. Michael Cragg from The Guardian said Xscape feels like an album created to showcase a handful of Jackson songs that on the whole deserve to be heard. Richard Suchet from Sky News thought the album sound[ed] more like modern-day remixes. Nick Stevenson from Mixmag asserted that the album was more like a collection of B-sides from Off the Wall than a follow-up to Invincible, but also described it as a collection of undiscovered gems presented in a way that fans from all generations will appreciate.

Many critics described the album as an improvement over its predecessor. Stephen Thomas Erlewine from AllMusic wrote that the album was savvier than Michael, writing that it considers Jackson's legacy quite carefully, deciding to emphasize the splashy soul and diluted disco of Off the Wall over the triumphant Thriller or any of the calculated records that followed in its wake. Joe Sweeney from Slant wrote that the album was a carefully curated attempt to redeem the sins of the hastily cobbled-together Michael that comes close to succeeding. Sweeny described the album as remotely cohesive, touching on disco, R&B, and contemporary dance music over the course of eight songs whose origins span nearly three decades. Elysa Gardner of USA Today said that the producers on the album ensure that Jackson's enduring strengths as a singer are represented, layering in modern electronic textures without overwhelming the distinctly slinky, shivery vocals or overall structure of the tunes. Writing for Yahoo!, Nekesa Mumbi Moody described the album as a mixed bag that fell below Jackson's standards. Tim Jonz from The Guardian felt that Xscape had an inevitable lack of coherence as a set but that it served to remind you why Jackson was once pop's premier genius.

== Commercial performance ==
Xscape became Jackson's tenth UK number-one album after it debuted atop the UK Albums Chart with 47,764 first-week sales. Currently, sales of the album in the United Kingdom stand at 135,500 copies and has been certified gold by the British Phonographic Industry. The album also debuted at number one in Belgium, Denmark, France, and Spain. It debuted at number two on the US Billboard charts with first-week sales of 157,000 copies in the United States. In its second week of sales, the album sold 67,000 more copies. In its third week it sold 35,000 copies bringing its total sales to 259,000 copies. In its fourth week, it sold a little more than 25,000 copies, and the fifth week it sold a little less than 25,000 copies. On September 18, 2014, the album was certified Gold in the US, selling 500,000 copies up to that date.

In Canada, the album debuted at number three on the Canadian Albums Chart, selling 12,000 copies.

== Track listing ==
Xscape – Standard version (catalog number 88843053662)
No.	Title	Writer(s)	Producer(s)	Length
1.	"Love Never Felt So Good" (recorded in 1980)	Michael Jackson; Paul Anka	Jackson; John McClain; Giorgio Tuinfort; Anka	3:54
2.	"Chicago" (recorded in 1999 under the title "She Was Loving Me" for the Invincible sessions)	Cory Rooney	Timbaland; Jerome "J-Roc" Harmon^{[a]}; Jackson^{[b]}; Rooney^{[b]}	4:05
3.	"Loving You" (recorded in 1985 for the Bad sessions)	Jackson	Timbaland; J-Roc^{[a]}; Jackson^{[b]}	3:15
4.	"A Place with No Name" (recorded in 1998 for the Invincible sessions)	Jackson; Elliot "Dr. Freeze" Straite; Dewey Bunnell	Stargate; Jackson^{[b]}; Dr. Freeze^{[b]}	5:35
5.	"Slave to the Rhythm" (recorded in 1991 for the Dangerous sessions)	Antonio "L.A." Reid; Kenneth "Babyface" Edmonds; Daryl Simmons; Kevin Roberson	Timbaland; J-Roc^{[a]}; Reid^{[b]}; Babyface^{[b]}	4:15
6.	"Do You Know Where Your Children Are" (recorded in 1986–1990 for the Bad and Dangerous sessions)	Jackson	Timbaland; J-Roc^{[a]}; Jackson^{[b]}	4:36
7.	"Blue Gangsta" (recorded in 1998–1999 for the Invincible sessions)	Jackson; Straite	King Solomon Logan; Daniel Jones; Timbaland; J-Roc^{[a]}; Jackson^{[b]}; Dr. Freeze^{[b]}	4:14
8.	"Xscape" (recorded in 1999 for the Invincible sessions)	Jackson; Rodney "Darkchild" Jerkins; Fred Jerkins III; LaShawn Daniels	Darkchild; Jackson^{[b]}	4:04
Total length:				34:25

Xscape – Sony Xperia Lounge bonus track
No.	Title	Writer(s)	Producer(s)	Length
9.	"Chicago" (Papercha$er Remix)	Rooney	Timbaland; J-Roc^{[a]}; Jackson^{[b]}; Rooney^{[b]}	4:19
Total length:				38:44

Xscape – Deluxe Edition (catalog number 88843066762)
No.	Title	Writer(s)	Producer(s)	Length
9.	"Love Never Felt So Good" (original version)	Jackson; Anka	Jackson; Anka	3:19
10.	"Chicago" (original version)	Rooney	Jackson; Rooney	4:43
11.	"Loving You" (original version)	Jackson	Jackson	3:02
12.	"A Place with No Name" (original version)	Jackson; Straite; Bunnell	Jackson; Dr. Freeze	4:55
13.	"Slave to the Rhythm" (original version)	Reid; Edmonds; Simmons; Roberson	Reid; Babyface	4:35
14.	"Do You Know Where Your Children Are" (original version)	Jackson	Jackson	4:39
15.	"Blue Gangsta" (original version)	Jackson; Straite	Jackson; Dr. Freeze	4:16
16.	"Xscape" (original version)	Jackson; R. Jerkins; F. Jerkins III; Daniels	Jackson; Darkchild	5:44
17.	"Love Never Felt So Good" (featuring Justin Timberlake)	Jackson; Anka	Timbaland; J-Roc^{[a]}; Jackson^{[b]}; Anka^{[b]}	4:05
Total length:				73:43

Xscape – Deluxe Edition bonus DVD
No.	Title	Length
1.	"Xscape Documentary"	23:21
2.	"Xscape Documentary Outtakes"	2:40
Total length:		25:57

=== Vinyl (catalog number 88843053661) ===
Side one
No.	Title	Writer(s)	Producer(s)	Length
1.	"Love Never Felt So Good"	Jackson; Anka	Jackson; McClain; Tuinfort; Anka	3:54
2.	"Chicago"	Rooney	Timbaland; J-Roc^{[a]}; Jackson^{[b]}; Rooney^{[b]}	4:05
3.	"Loving You"	Jackson	Timbaland; J-Roc^{[a]}; Jackson^{[b]}	3:15
4.	"A Place with No Name"	Jackson; Straite; Bunnell	Stargate; Jackson^{[b]}; Dr. Freeze^{[b]}	5:35

Side two
No.	Title	Writer(s)	Producer(s)	Length
5.	"Slave to the Rhythm"	Reid; Edmonds; Simmons; Roberson	Timbaland; J-Roc^{[a]}; Reid^{[b]}; Babyface^{[b]}	4:15
6.	"Do You Know Where Your Children Are"	Jackson	Timbaland; J-Roc^{[a]}; Jackson^{[b]}	4:36
7.	"Blue Gangsta"	Jackson; Straite	Logan; Jones; Timbaland; J-Roc^{[a]}; Jackson^{[b]}; Dr. Freeze^{[b]}	4:14
8.	"Xscape"	Jackson; Jerkins; Jerkins III; Daniels	Darkchild; Jackson^{[b]}	4:04
9.	"Love Never Felt So Good" (featuring Justin Timberlake)	Jackson; Anka	Timbaland; J-Roc^{[a]}; Jackson^{[b]}; Anka^{[b]}	4:05
Total length:				38:30

Notes

- ^{^[a]} signifies a co-producer
- ^{^[b]} signifies a vocal producer

== Personnel ==
Credits adapted from Xscape album liner notes.

- Michael Jackson – lead and background vocals, producer (1, 9–12, 14–16), vocal producer (2–4, 6–8, 17)
- Dayna Anderson – violin (tracks 5–7, 17)
- Paul Anka – producer and original piano (track 1), piano (9), vocal producer (17)
- Babyface – vocal producer (track 5), producer and keyboards (13)
- Paul Bailey – assistant engineer (tracks 3, 6)
- Cheryl Banks – production coordination
- Davis Barnett – viola (tracks 5–7, 17)
- Michelle Bishop – violin (tracks 5–7)
- Adam Blackstone – bass (track 17)
- Bill Bottrell – engineer (track 14)
- John Branca – executive producer
- Stuart Brawley – engineer and second engineer (track 16)
- Greg Burns – second engineer (tracks 12, 16)
- Jeff Burns – second engineer (tracks 12, 15, 16)
- Brad Buxer – keyboards (track 15)
- Demacio "Demo" Castellon – engineer (tracks 6, 17), mixing (17)
- Jeff Chestek – engineer (tracks 5–7, 17)
- Vadim Chislov – assistant engineer (tracks 6, 17), assistant mixing (17)
- Eliza Cho – violin (tracks 5–7)
- Cody Cichowski – assistant engineer (track 17)
- Nina Cottman – viola (track 17)
- LaShawn Daniels – background vocals (tracks 8, 16)
- Arlia de Ruiter – violin (track 1)
- Eddie Delena – engineer (track 12)
- Jeroen de Rijk – percussion (track 1)
- C.J. DeVillar – bass and assistant engineer (track 12), engineer (15)
- Alex DeYoung – assistant engineer (track 1)
- Chris Desmond – engineer (track 11)
- John Doelp – associate producer
- Guillame Combet – violin (track 17)
- Mike Donaldson – engineer and additional vocal editing (track 8)
- Craig Durrance – second engineer (track 16)
- Eric – drums and percussion (track 15)
- Sean Erick – horns (track 17)
- Mikkel S. Eriksen – producer, engineer, and instrumentation (track 4)
- Blake Espy – violin (tracks 5–7, 17)
- Mike Daddy Evans – production coordination
- Glenn Fischbach – cello (track 17)
- Matt Forger – engineer (tracks 11, 14)
- Rick Frazier – production coordination
- Dr. Freeze – vocal producer (tracks 4, 7), producer and background vocals (12, 15), synths, horns, and meows (15)
- Brian "Big Bass" Gardner – mastering (tracks 1–8, 17)
- Humberto Gatica – engineer (track 12)
- Brad Gilderman – engineer (track 16)
- Mike Ging – engineer (tracks 12, 15)
- Chris Godbey – engineer (tracks 2, 3, 5, 6, 17), mixing (2, 3, 5–7, 17)
- Larry Gold – string arrangements (tracks 5–8, 17)
- Franny Graham – second engineer (track 16)
- Bernie Grundman – mastering (tracks 9–16)
- Fredrik Strand Halland – guitar (track 8)
- Jerome "J-Roc" Harmon – co-producer (tracks 2, 3, 5–7), producer (17)
- Trehy Harris – mixing (track 8)
- Harvey – percussion (track 16)
- Tor Erik Hermansen – producer and instrumentation (track 4)
- Jerry Hey – original horns (track 7), horns (15)
- Kevin Hissink – guitar (track 1)
- Mieke Honingh – violin (track 1)
- Jean-Marie Horvat – engineer (track 16)
- Norman Jansen – violin (track 1)
- Rodney "Darkchild" Jerkins – producer (tracks 8, 16); vocal producer, engineer, and mixing (8); background vocals and mouth percussion (16)
- Perry Jimenez – assistant engineer (tracks 2, 5), engineer (7)
- Dan Johnson – second engineer (track 12)
- Brandon Jones – engineer (track 7)
- Daniel Jones – producer (track 7)
- Michael Jorgersen – violin (track 17)
- Jaycen Joshua – mixing (track 8)
- Julia Jowett – violin (track 1)
- Tommy Joyner – assistant engineer (track 17)
- A. Kilhoffer – second engineer (track 16)
- Jonathan Kim – viola (tracks 5–7, 17)
- Sarah Koch – violin (track 1)
- Wim Kok – violin (track 1)
- Rutger "Ruffi" Kroese – drum programming and assistant engineer (track 1)
- Emma Kummrow – violin (tracks 5–7, 17)
- Vera Laporeva – violin (track 1)
- Jennifer Lee – violin (track 17)
- Tamae Lee – violin (tracks 5–7, 17)
- Arend Liefkes – bass (track 1)
- Elisabeth Liefkes-Cats – violin (track 1)
- King Solomon Logan – producer (track 7)
- Jennie Lorenzo – cello (tracks 5–7, 17)
- Luigi Mazzocchi – violin (tracks 5–7)
- Steve McAuley – second engineer (track 16)
- John McClain – executive producer, producer (track 1)
- Paul McKenna – engineer (track 13)
- Ranaan L. Meyer – bass (tracks 5–7)
- Erica Miller – violin (tracks 5–7)
- Mo Horns – horns (track 8)
- Jesús Morales – cello (tracks 5–7)
- Greg Morgan – break editing & sound design (track 8)
- Cole Nystrom – assistant engineer (track 1)
- Adam Olmsted – assistant engineer (track 12), second engineer (15)
- Charles Parker – violin (tracks 5–7, 17)
- David Peijnenburg – violin (track 1)
- Dave Pensado – mixing (track 1)
- Karl Petersen – assistant engineer (tracks 5–7)
- Greg Phillinganes – Minimoog (track 15)
- Larry Phillabaum – second engineer (track 16)
- Paul Power – engineer (track 1)
- Antonio "L.A." Reid – vocal producer (track 5); producer, drums, and percussion (13); music coordinator
- Daniela Rivera – additional/assistant engineer (track 4)
- Kevin "Kayo" Roberson – bass (track 13)
- Cory Rooney – vocal producer (track 2), producer (10)
- Carlos Rubio – violin (tracks 5–7)
- Thom Russo – second engineer (track 13)
- Rafa Sardina – second engineer (track 15)
- Marcel Schimscheimer – bass (track 1)
- Leon Silva – horns (track 17)
- Renee Steffy-Warnick – viola (tracks 5–7)
- Bruce Swedien – engineer (tracks 13, 16)
- Tom Sweeney – second engineer (track 15)
- David Swope – assistant engineer (track 10)
- Phil Tan – mixing (track 4)
- Annie Tangberg – cello (track 1)
- Pauline Terlouw – violin (track 1)
- Timbaland – executive producer, producer (tracks 2, 3, 5–7, 17)
- Justin Timberlake – lead vocals (track 17)
- Steve Tirpak – copyist and assistant to string arranger (tracks 5–7, 17)
- Giorgio Tuinfort – producer, drum programming, and additional piano (track 1)
- Vera Van Der Bie – violin (track 1)
- Franck van der Heijden – orchestral arrangements and conductor (track 1)
- Bastiaan Van Der Werf – cello (track 1)
- Herman Van Haaren – violin (track 1)
- Mark Ward – cello (tracks 5–7)
- Dan Warner – guitar (tracks 2, 6, 17)
- Matt Weber – assistant mixing (tracks 2, 3, 5–7, 17)
- David Williams – original guitar solo (track 6), guitar solo (14)
- Kevin Williams – horns (track 17)
- Robb Williams – engineer (track 10)
- Mat Maitland – cover imagery, art direction and design
- Cover containing photographic element by Bill Nation

== Charts ==
=== Weekly charts ===
Chart (2014)	Peak position
Australian Albums (ARIA)	2
Austrian Albums (Ö3 Austria)	2
Belgian Albums (Ultratop Flanders)	1
Belgian Albums (Ultratop Wallonia)	1
Canadian Albums (Billboard)	3
Chinese Albums (Sino Chart)	2
Croatian Albums (HDU)	2
Czech Albums (ČNS IFPI)	5
Danish Albums (Hitlisten)	1
Dutch Albums (Album Top 100)	2
Finnish Albums (Suomen virallinen lista)	5
French Albums (SNEP)	1
German Albums (Offizielle Top 100)	2
Greek Albums (IFPI)	6
Hungarian Albums (MAHASZ)	4
Irish Albums (IRMA)	4
Italian Albums (FIMI)	2
Japanese Albums (Oricon)	4
Mexican Albums (Top 100 Mexico)	4
New Zealand Albums (RMNZ)	3
Norwegian Albums (VG-lista)	2
Polish Albums (ZPAV)	4
Portuguese Albums (AFP)	3
Scottish Albums (Official Charts)	3
South African Albums (RISA)	13
South Korean Albums (Gaon)	6
South Korean International Albums (Gaon)	1
Spanish Albums (Promusicae)	1
Swedish Albums (Sverigetopplistan)	3
Swiss Albums (Schweizer Hitparade)	2
UK Albums (Official Charts)	1
US Billboard 200	2
US Top R&B/Hip-Hop Albums (Billboard)	1

=== Monthly charts ===
Chart (2014)	Peak position
Argentine Monthly Albums (CAPIF)	5
South Korean Albums (Gaon)	16
South Korean International Albums (Gaon)	2

=== Year-end charts ===
Chart (2014)	Position
Australian Albums (ARIA)	66
Austrian Albums (Ö3 Austria)	56
Belgian Albums (Ultratop Flanders)	13
Belgian Albums (Ultratop Wallonia)	15
Dutch Albums (Album Top 100)	10
French Albums (SNEP)	28
German Albums (Offizielle Top 100)	39
Italian Albums (FIMI)	38
South Korean International Albums (Gaon)	15
Spanish Albums (PROMUSICAE)	21
Swiss Albums (Schweizer Hitparade)	34
UK Albums (OCC)	44
US Billboard 200	36
US Top R&B/Hip-Hop Albums (Billboard)	7
US Top R&B Albums (Billboard)	5

== Certifications and sales ==
Region	Certification	Certified units/sales
Australia (ARIA)	Gold	35,000^{^}
Austria (IFPI Austria)	Gold	7,500^{*}
Belgium (BRMA)	Gold	15,000^{*}
Canada (Music Canada)	Gold	40,000^{^}
Denmark (IFPI Danmark)	Platinum	20,000^{‡}
France (SNEP)	Platinum	130,000
Germany (BVMI)	Gold	100,000^{^}
Italy (FIMI)	Gold	25,000^{*}
Japan (RIAJ)	Gold	100,000^{^}
Mexico (AMPROFON)	Platinum+Gold	90,000^{‡}
New Zealand (RMNZ)	Platinum	15,000^{‡}
Poland (ZPAV)	Platinum	20,000^{*}
South Korea (Gaon)	—	12,224
Spain (Promusicae)	Gold	20,000^{^}
Sweden (GLF)	Gold	20,000^{‡}
Switzerland (IFPI Switzerland)	Gold	10,000^{^}
United Kingdom (BPI)	Gold	100,000^{*}
United States (RIAA)	Gold	500,000^{^}
^{*} Sales figures based on certification alone.^{^} Shipments figures based on certification alone.^{‡} Sales+streaming figures based on certification alone.

== Release history ==
List of release dates, showing country or region, record label, and format
Region	Date	Label	Format
Austria	May 9, 2014	Sony Music	CD; digital download
Denmark	May 9, 2014	Sony Music	CD; digital download
Germany	May 9, 2014	Sony Music	CD; digital download
Spain	May 9, 2014	Sony Music	CD; digital download
France	May 12, 2014	Sony Music	CD; digital download
United Kingdom	May 12, 2014	Epic	CD; digital download
India	May 12, 2014	Sony Music	CD; digital download
Italy	May 13, 2014	Sony Music	CD; digital download
Canada	May 13, 2014	Sony Music	CD; digital download
United States	May 13, 2014	Epic; MJJ	CD; digital download
Mexico	May 21, 2014	Sony Music	CD; digital download
Japan	May 21, 2014	Sony Music Japan	CD
Germany	June 6, 2014	Sony Music	LP
United States	June 10, 2014	Epic; MJJ	LP
China	June 25, 2014	Sony Music China	CD

== See also ==
- List of unreleased songs recorded by Michael Jackson
- List of music released posthumously
