= Love Never Felt So Good =

Single by Michael Jackson and Justin Timberlake

from the album Xscape
- Released: May 2, 2014
- Recorded: 1980 (original); 2010–2014 (reworked)
- Studio: Paul Anka's home studio (Carmel) (original sessions): Power Sound Studios (Amsterdam) (reworked); Chalice Studios (Los Angeles) (duet version); Sonar Sound Studios (Zurich) (duet version)
- Genre: Disco; funk; R&B; dance-pop
- Length: 3:21 (original version); 3:57 (reworked); 4:05 (duet version)
- Label: Epic; MJJ
- Songwriters: Michael Jackson; Paul Anka
- Producers: Michael Jackson; John McClain; Giorgio Tuinfort; Timbaland; J-Roc

Michael Jackson singles chronology
"I'm So Blue" (2012)	"Love Never Felt So Good" (2014)	"A Place with No Name" (2014)

Justin Timberlake singles chronology
"Not a Bad Thing" (2014)	"Love Never Felt So Good" (2014)	"Drink You Away" (2015)

Music video
- "Love Never Felt So Good" on YouTube

"Love Never Felt So Good" is a song by American singer and songwriter Michael Jackson, released posthumously on May 2, 2014. The song, reworked from a 1980 demo track originally composed by Jackson and Canadian singer-songwriter Paul Anka, was the first single released from Jackson's second posthumous album, Xscape.

Two versions of the single were developed. The first was a solo version produced by American record producer John McClain and Dutch record producer Giorgio Tuinfort. The second version was a duet featuring fellow American singer Justin Timberlake, produced by American record producers Timbaland and J-Roc, which received positive reviews from music critics. Its accompanying music video premiered on May 14, 2014, on The Ellen DeGeneres Show. In the video, Timberlake appears with a crowd of young dancers, who reference Jackson's most known dance moves, interspersed with archival footage of the pop singer's many short films. The song is the second collaboration between Jackson and Anka to be released since Jackson's death in 2009—the first being "This Is It".

The duet version of "Love Never Felt So Good" charted within the top ten in eighteen international charts, reaching the top spot in five countries. Michael Jackson became the first artist in history to have a top 10 single on the US Billboard Hot 100 in five different decades when "Love Never Felt So Good" reached number 9 on May 31, 2014 (six decades if his Jackson 5 tenure is included). It spent eight weeks on top of the US Adult R&B Songs. The song also charted at number 8 on the UK Singles Chart.

== Background ==
The original demo was conceived and recorded during a two-week collaborative stint between Jackson and Anka in 1980, around the same time as "This Is It" (originally titled "I Never Heard") and "Don't Matter to Me". The original version only featured Jackson's vocals, finger snaps and a piano, played by Anka. The song was later recorded by Johnny Mathis, with revised lyrics by Anka and Kathleen Wakefield. The Mathis version was included on his 1984 album, A Special Part of Me. In 2006, Jackson's demo leaked online.

In 2010, the co-executor of the estate of Michael Jackson, John McClain, and Dutch composer, Giorgio Tuinfort, remixed the track to be considered for Michael, the first posthumous album of Jackson's unreleased material. The track was ultimately not selected for the Michael album.

In 2014, after being left on the cutting room floor for four years, the McClain/Tuinfort version of the track was selected as the first track on the Xscape album. Yet another version of the track—co-produced by Timbaland with J-Roc and featuring vocals from Justin Timberlake—was included as a bonus track on the deluxe version of Xscape. The version featuring Timberlake also includes sampled percussion and breaths from Jackson's 1979 song "Working Day and Night".

== Release ==
On April 30, 2014, it was revealed that "Love Never Felt So Good" would be unveiled at the iHeartRadio Music Awards on May 1, 2014, as the album's first single. During the awards show, the song premiered with a tribute by American R&B singer Usher. The digital download for the single became available on iTunes at 0:01 EDT on May 2, 2014, on both its album version and duet version with Justin Timberlake. The release date of the single to urban radio stations was confirmed as May 6, 2014, though actually the single hit the radios on May 2. On May 10, 2014, a Fedde Le Grand remix was announced and world-premiered by Danny Howard on his BBC Radio 1 show Dance Anthems. The remix was released on May 19, 2014.

== Critical reception ==
Upon its release, "Love Never Felt So Good" received positive reviews from critics. Surprised by the quality of the song, Aisha Harris from Slate magazine wrote that Timberlake's version "sounds like an outtake from Off the Wall" and further commented: "If producers are going to put out more MJ music, let's hope it continues to sound this good." Chris Richards of The Washington Post called the solo Jackson rendition "terrific. It's airy, sweet, funky and pretty much impossible to dislike," but panned the Timberlake remix, which he commented "surfaces all the grody feelings that came rushing in 2010 with Jackson's first posthumous album, Michael."

Gavin Edwards from Rolling Stone said, "even if it isn't on a par with Jackson's best work, it sounded like it could have easily been the sixth single off Bad, which is more impressive than it sounds." Stephanie Chase from Contactmusic said, "It's not groundbreaking or an exceptional example of his artistry, but it gives a good indication that Xscape could serve as a fitting tribute to Jackson and his legacy. Jon O'Brien from Yahoo! commented: "the classy disco-soul of this single could easily have been lifted from Off the Wall or Thriller."

"Love Never Felt So Good" also got praised by musician DJ Cassidy, who told the song had a positive impact on him.

I haven't been a huge fan of albums that come out after an artist dies. You know, it just doesn't have their stamp on it, so it's never going to be what it would have been if the person was alive. But "Love Never Felt So Good" was a great record. It was definitely one of my top five songs from the last five years.

== Commercial performance ==
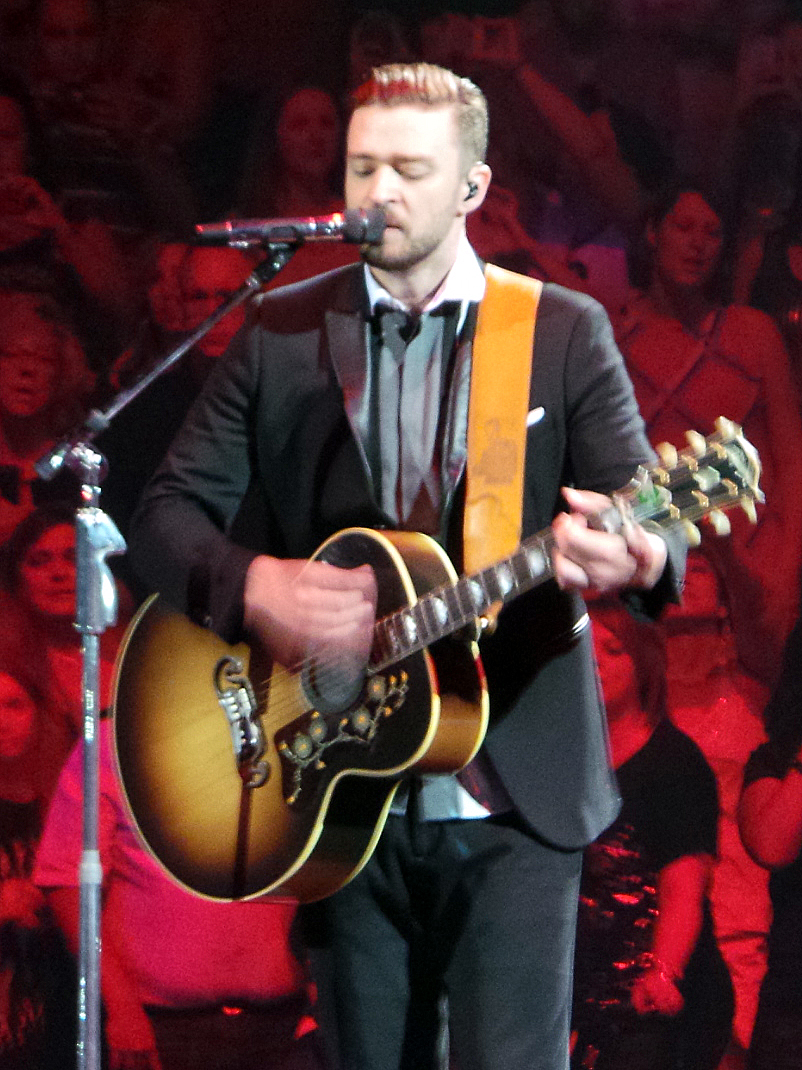
"Love Never Felt So Good" became Michael Jackson's 29th top-ten single, while the duet version became Justin Timberlake's (pictured) 16th on the US Billboard Hot 100.

The single debuted on the UK Singles Chart at No. 27 in the issue dated May 4, 2014, after just 24 hours on sale. It reached number one in South Korea, Denmark, Israel, South Africa, and Germany and Belgium's respective urban charts.

In the United States, the single sold more than 90,000 downloads from the debut date of May 2, 2014, to May 4, 2014, and drew 52 million all-format radio audience impressions since its first plays that Friday. With the Clear Channel's promotional synergy after the premiere of the song on the iHeartRadio Music Awards, the song received hourly plays on May 2, 2014, on the company's pop, adult and R&B/hip-hop stations, greatly contributing to its airplay, which made the song debut on the following Billboard radio charts: Adult R&B Songs (No. 1), Adult Contemporary (No. 2), R&B/Hip-Hop Airplay (No. 4) and Adult Pop Songs (No. 21). The song made splashy debuts at No. 20 on the Billboard Hot 100 and No. 6 on Billboard Hot R&B/Hip-Hop Songs from 80,000 downloads sold, 34 million audience impressions from 358 radio stations, and 1.9 million US streams, which made it Jackson's highest-charting entry since the 2002 single "Butterflies". After its first full week on sale, the song reached No. 6 on Billboard's Digital Songs chart with sales of 101,000 copies, but the whole week radio audience impressions reduced 36% to 22 million which caused the song to drop to No. 38 on Radio Songs, and lowered the song's Hot 100 position to No. 22 in its second week on the chart. In its third week, the song rose to No. 9, becoming Jackson's first top-ten hit since 2001's "You Rock My World". Jackson also became the first act in the Hot 100's history to score top ten hits in five different decades, as he has done for each decade from the 1970s to the 2010s. The single then topped the US Billboard Top Adult R&B Songs chart for 8 weeks. "Love Never Felt So Good" has since been certified platinum by the Recording Industry Association of America (RIAA). As of 2018, the song has sold 1.11 million copies in the country.

Counting Jackson's entire chart career in addition to his solo career, the 2010s is actually his sixth decade with a single charted (not peaking) in the US Top 10, as The Jackson 5 single "I Want You Back" first reached the Top 10 the week of December 27, 1969, on its way to a number one peak in late January 1970; however, Jackson was not credited on that single as an individual artist.

In 2014, "Love Never Felt So Good" was ranked as the 78th most popular song of the year (2014) on the Billboard Hot 100.

== Music videos ==
The music video for the duet debuted in the morning on May 14, 2014, which was regarded as "a careful visual tribute of the late pop singer's lasting legacy on future generations." It was directed by Rich Lee and Justin Timberlake. A crowd of young dancers lip-synced and Justin Timberlake sang along and made some memorable moves from Michael Jackson's classic music videos or live shows. Clips from the following music videos appeared in the "Love Never Felt So Good" music video (in order of appearance):

- "Black or White"
- "The Way You Make Me Feel"
- "Jam"
- "Speed Demon"
- "Billie Jean"
- "Smooth Criminal"
- "Bad"
- "Remember the Time"
- "Beat It"
- "In the Closet"
- "Don't Stop 'Til You Get Enough"
- "Liberian Girl"
- "Another Part of Me"
- "Thriller"
- "ABC" (live performance by The Jackson 5)
- "Blame It on the Boogie" (by The Jacksons)
- "Blood on the Dance Floor"

A month later, a music video for the solo version was uploaded to the official Michael Jackson YouTube channel. The audio track, although very similar, is not the same as the album version of the track. It features a different bass track, a different guitar track, an electric piano, a flute, reworked snaps and claps, and slight changes in mixing in regards to audio panning. Minor changes to the song's form were also done including the harmony to the second verse being altered. The music video featured clips from the duet version, as well as clips from other Michael Jackson music videos, such as "Dirty Diana", "Rock With You" and "You Rock My World", along with some of Jackson's live performances, such as "Billie Jean".

== Live performance ==
The song was performed live at the iHeartRadio Music Awards on May 1, 2014. Fellow American singer Usher danced across the stage, moonwalked, and hopped on a table to spin during the play of the song. Other dancers dressed in Jackson's style performed his signature moves in front of digital backdrops flashing graffiti and brick walls.

== Awards and nominations ==
Year	Award	Category	Result	Ref.
2014	Soul Train Music Awards	Song of the Year	Nominated	
2014	Soul Train Music Awards	Best Collaboration	Nominated	
2014	MTV Video Music Awards	Best Choreography	Nominated	
2015	NAACP Image Award	Outstanding Music Video	Nominated	
2015	BMI R&B/Hip-Hop Awards	Most Performed R&B/Hip-Hop Songs	Won	

== Track listing ==
- Digital download – solo version
1. "Love Never Felt So Good" – 3:54
- Digital download – duet version
1. "Love Never Felt So Good" (with Justin Timberlake) – 4:05
- Digital download – Fedde Le Grand remix
1. "Love Never Felt So Good" (Fedde Le Grand remix) – 4:43
- CD single
1. "Love Never Felt So Good" – 3:54
2. "Love Never Felt So Good" (with Justin Timberlake) – 4:05
- Digital EP – duet version
1. "Love Never Felt So Good" (DM-FK Classic Tribute mix) – 8:23
2. "Love Never Felt So Good" (DM Classic radio mix) – 4:11
3. "Love Never Felt So Good" (DM Epic dub) – 7:54
4. "Love Never Felt So Good" (DM Red Zone dub) – 6:52

== Personnel ==
- Lyrics written by Michael Jackson
- Piano written by Paul Anka
- Original piano by Paul Anka
- Vocal arrangement by Michael Jackson
- Produced by Michael Jackson
- Rhythm arrangement by Michael Jackson
- Featured and additional background vocals by Justin Timberlake
- Keyboard by Paul Anka
- Horns by The Regiment Horns
- Percussion by Terry Santiel
- Guitars by Elliott Ives and Mike Scott
- Bass by Mike Scott

== Charts ==
=== Weekly charts ===
Weekly chart performance for "Love Never Felt So Good"
Chart (2014)	Peak position
Australia (ARIA)	28
Austria (Ö3 Austria Top 40)	20
Belgium (Ultratop 50 Flanders)	4
Belgium Dance (Ultratop Flanders)	6
Belgium Urban (Ultratop Flanders)	1
Belgium (Ultratop 50 Wallonia)	6
Brazil (Billboard Brasil Hot 100)	2
Canada Hot 100 (Billboard)	20
Canada AC (Billboard)	5
Canada CHR/Top 40 (Billboard)	45
Canada Hot AC (Billboard)	26
Czech Republic Airplay (ČNS IFPI)	38
Czech Republic Singles Digital (ČNS IFPI)	56
Denmark (Tracklisten)	1
France (SNEP)	2
Germany (GfK)	18
Germany (Deutsche Black Charts)	1
Hungary (Rádiós Top 40)	8
Hungary (Single Top 40)	2
Ireland (IRMA)	17
Israel International Airplay (Media Forest)	1
Italy (FIMI)	4
Lebanon (The Official Lebanese Top 20)	8
Luxembourg Digital Song Sales (Billboard)	6
Mexico (Billboard Ingles Airplay)	4
Mexico Anglo (Monitor Latino)	4
Netherlands (Dutch Top 40)	11
Netherlands (Single Top 100)	2
New Zealand (Recorded Music NZ)	12
Poland Airplay (ZPAV)	13
Poland Dance (ZPAV)	1
Portugal Digital Song Sales (Billboard)	3
Scottish Singles Sales (Official Charts)	19
Slovakia Airplay (ČNS IFPI)	25
Slovakia Singles Digital (ČNS IFPI)	8
South Africa Airplay (EMA)	1
South Korea (International) (Gaon)	1
Spain (Promusicae)	6
Sweden (Sverigetopplistan)	57
Switzerland (Schweizer Hitparade)	15
UK Singles (Official Charts)	8
US Billboard Hot 100	9
US Hot R&B/Hip-Hop Songs (Billboard)	5
US Adult Contemporary (Billboard)	7
US Adult R&B Songs (Billboard)	1
US Adult Pop Airplay (Billboard)	23
US Dance Airplay (Billboard)	23
US Dance Club Songs (Billboard)	8
US Pop Airplay (Billboard)	29

=== Year-end charts ===
Year-end chart performance for "Love Never Felt So Good"
Chart (2014)	Position
Belgium (Ultratop 50 Flanders)	38
Belgium Urban (Ultratop)	5
Belgium (Ultratop 50 Wallonia)	44
Brazil (Crowley)	68
Canada Hot 100 (Billboard)	89
Germany (Official German Charts)	73
Hungary (Rádiós Top 40)	66
Hungary (Single Top 40)	15
Israel International Airplay (Media Forest)	11
Italy (FIMI)	54
Japan Adult Contemporary (Billboard) Duet	86
Japan Adult Contemporary (Billboard) Solo	7
Netherlands (Dutch Top 40)	66
Netherlands (Single Top 100)	36
South Korea (International) (Gaon)	18
Spain (PROMUSICAE)	22
Switzerland (Schweizer Hitparade)	74
Taiwan (Hito Radio)	94
UK Singles (Official Charts)	69
US Billboard Hot 100	78
US Hot R&B/Hip-Hop Songs (Billboard)	22
US Adult Contemporary (Billboard)	26
US Adult R&B Songs (Billboard)	4

== Certifications ==
Certifications for "Love Never Felt So Good"
Region	Certification	Certified units/sales
Belgium (BRMA)	Gold	15,000^{*}
Brazil (Pro-Música Brasil)	3× Platinum	180,000^{‡}
Canada (Music Canada)	2× Platinum	160,000^{‡}
Denmark (IFPI Danmark)	Platinum	90,000^{‡}
Germany (BVMI)	Platinum	300,000^{‡}
Italy (FIMI)	Platinum	30,000^{‡}
Mexico (AMPROFON)	Platinum+Gold	90,000^{*}
New Zealand (RMNZ)	2× Platinum	60,000^{‡}
Spain (Promusicae)	Gold	30,000^{‡}
United Kingdom (BPI)	Platinum	600,000^{‡}
United States (RIAA)	Platinum	1,110,000
^{*} Sales figures based on certification alone.^{‡} Sales+streaming figures based on certification alone.

== Release history ==
Release history and formats for "Love Never Felt So Good"
Country	Date	Format	Version	Label	Ref.
Italy	May 2, 2014	Contemporary hit radio	Solo; Duet	Epic	
United States	May 2, 2014	Digital download	Solo; Duet	Epic; MJJ	
United States	May 6, 2014	Contemporary hit radio	Duet	Epic	
United States	May 6, 2014	Adult contemporary radio	Solo; Duet	Epic	
United States	May 6, 2014	Urban contemporary radio	Solo	Epic	
United States	May 19, 2014	Digital download	Fedde Le Grand remix	MJJ	
Germany	May 30, 2014	CD single	Solo; Duet	Sony	

== See also ==
- List of number-one singles of 2014 in South Africa
- List of number-one international songs of 2014 in South Korea
