= List of unreleased songs recorded by Michael Jackson =

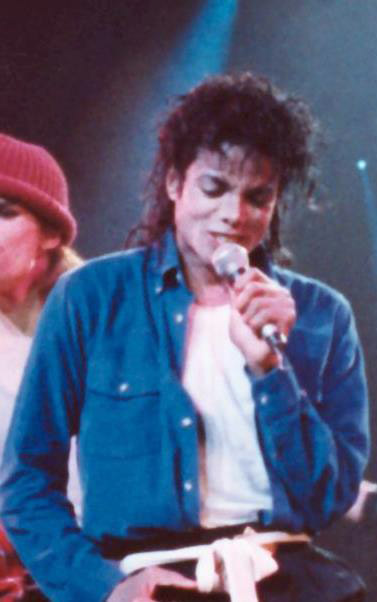
Jackson performing in 1988

Michael Jackson (1958–2009) was an American musician and entertainer. He is known to have written, recorded, and filmed material that has never been released. Many of his unreleased songs have been registered—usually by his company Mijac Music—with professional bodies such as the United States Copyright Office, the Songwriters Hall of Fame, Broadcast Music Incorporated (BMI), American Society of Composers, Authors, and Publishers (ASCAP), the Canadian Musical Reproduction Rights Agency (CMRRA) and EMI Music Publishing. This list only documents the songs explicitly cited as unreleased and therefore doesn't contain every unreleased song registered with such bodies.

Many officially unreleased songs had been scheduled, at one point, for release, through ways such as his six solo studio albums with music label Epic Records: Off the Wall (1979), Thriller (1982), Bad (1987), Dangerous (1991), HIStory (1995) and Invincible (2001) and the remix album Blood on the Dance Floor: HIStory in the Mix (1997). For varying reasons, the tracks were rejected and, as of 2026, remain unreleased. Jackson's unreleased material includes songs recorded as a solo artist (including covers of songs released by other artists and the Jackson 5 songs) and demo versions, some featuring established artists such as Freddie Mercury and Barry Gibb. Between 1974 and 2009, Jackson recorded "at least 1,000–2,000 songs" according to close partners Bill Bottrell and Bruce Swedien. Bottrell claimed "only a small percentage of Michael's full catalog has been released", and that "he recorded a lot of music in his 3-decade career".

In 2009, after Jackson's sudden death, La Toya Jackson said that she had discovered two hard disks at her brother's home that contained more than 100 unreleased songs, many of which were unregistered. Several of Jackson's songs have been leaked onto the Internet, such as a 24-second segment of "A Place with No Name" leaked by TMZ.com following Jackson's death. At the time of the leak, it was claimed that there were "thousands" of unreleased songs by Jackson, and that they could be issued for years to come. The Rock and Roll Hall of Fame curator, Jim Henke, noted that any future releases would garner significant attention. On March 16, 2010, Sony Music Entertainment signed a $250 million deal with Jackson's estate to retain distribution rights to his recordings until 2017 and release ten posthumous albums over the next decade, but this did not come to fruition as only three releases contained previously unreleased material: Michael (2010), the second disc from Bad 25 (2012), and Xscape (2014).

== Key ==
†	Denotes songs registered with Broadcast Music Incorporated (BMI) and/or American Society of Composers, Authors and Publishers (ASCAP)
*	Denotes songs cited by Jackson in his 1993 deposition
^{(Year)}	Denotes songs registered with the United States Copyright Office and the year of registration
*^{(Year)}	Denotes songs cited by Jackson in his 1993 deposition and the year they were registered with the United States Copyright Office

== Songs ==
Title	Writer(s)	Notes	Ref.
"11pm"^{(2010)}	Michael Jackson; Brad Buxer	Instrumental track originally produced by Buxer	
"A Baby Smiles"*	Michael Jackson	Lyrics to the song were featured as a poem titled "When Babies Smile" in the 1992 book Dancing the Dream	
"A Pretty Face Is"	Stevie Wonder	Originally written in 1974; The song was originally intended for the Jackson 5 but was later recorded as a duet between Wonder and Jackson; the two reportedly recorded the song for Wonder's 1987 Characters album	
"Adore You"^{(2009)}	Michael Jackson; Brad Buxer	Written and recorded during sessions at the Neverland Ranch between late 2004 and January 2005; Only "background vocals" were recorded by Jackson and a full 30-piece choir; Listed on notes consisting of songs Jackson wanted to finish that were found in his bedroom after his death; Full song leaked onto the internet in January 2026	
"All the Truth"^{†}	Bryan Loren	One of around 20–25 songs recorded with Loren for the Dangerous album between 1989 and 1991; Also known as "All the Truth You Need"; Loren sings the verses on this song, with Jackson in the choruses; Described to be similar to "Do the Bartman"; Appears in a set of DATs found in a storage locker formerly owned by Loren in late 2024, alongside other tracks	
"Alright Now"*	Michael Jackson; John Barnes	Originally recorded in 1983 during the Victory sessions; Considered to be vocally complete; Given to Ralph Tresvant to record for his 1990 album Ralph Tresvant; Said to sound identical to Tresvant's version; Tresvant's version of the song features Jackson on background vocals	
"Apocalypse Now"	Michael Jackson	Written and recorded during the Bad sessions; Consists of numerous military cadences composed by drummer John Robinson; Described by Robinson in Rhythm magazine: "There was a track I did called 'Apocalypse Now' that I wrote six and a half minutes of military drum cadences for. I brought in Don Williams, Dan Greco, and Bob Zimmitti. We recorded with four field snares, four piccolo snares, two sets of piatti, and one gran casa. It was a very hip tune, but it never made the record. I was kind of upset about that."	
"Ask Rene"	Michael Jackson	Written and recorded during the HIStory sessions; Also known as "Ask Rene 3"; Instrumental groove with no vocals; Multiple DATs featuring the song were put up for auction in 2013	
"Bad Girl"*	Michael Jackson	Written and recorded on February 28, 1986, at Hayvenhurst during the Bad sessions; Although vocals were recorded, it was never worked on again; Bottrell is unaware of current state of completion of song	
"Bang Your Head"^{(2010)}	Michael Jackson; Theron Feemster		
"Beatbox 2010"^{(2009)}	Michael Jackson; Eric J. Kirkland; Michael Durham Prince		
"Bio"	Michael Jackson; Brad Buxer	Recorded in October 1997 at Buxer's home studio approximately a week after the HIStory World Tour ended; Was allegedly the first song worked on for the Invincible album, alongside "Seeing Voices" and "Monster"	
"Bombay Nights"	Michael Jackson	Written and recorded in during the HIStory sessions; A DAT tape containing the song was auctioned in 2013 alongside other songs; Described as a "repetitive, yet funky" track; Full song leaked onto the internet in January 2026; Has a runtime of 6:25 minutes	
"Boots Song"	Michael Jackson	Written and recorded in 1979 during the Off the Wall sessions; Also known as "Boots Groove"; Described as having a similar sound to "Get on the Floor" with a Brothers Johnson-inspired bass line; Has a runtime of 4:49 minutes	
"Bottom of My Heart"^{(2010)}	Michael Jackson; Brad Buxer	Also known as "From the Bottom of My Heart"; Recorded between 2006 and 2008; instrumental track; Listed on notes consisting of songs Jackson wanted to finish that were found in his bedroom after his death; Has a runtime of 5:24 minutes; Full song leaked onto the internet in January 2026	
"Boy No"^{(2009)}	Michael Jackson; Brad Buxer	Written and recorded in 2007; Vocally incomplete; is a somber song about loneliness; Has a runtime of 3:37 minutes	
"Breathe"	Michael Jackson; Deepak Chopra	Instrumental track recorded in 2009; also known as "Breath" and erroneously titled "Breed" in a Rolling Stone interview; Reportedly the final track worked on by Jackson prior to his death; A snippet of the song was played by Chopra during an interview shortly after Jackson's passing	
"Broken Chair"^{(2010)}	Michael Jackson; Theron Feemster	Instrumental track featuring "booming digital drums and rock/electric guitar", co-produced with Theron "Neff-U" Feemster; The name "Broken Chair" was a working title and a placeholder until lyrics were to be written; Listed on notes consisting of songs Jackson wanted to finish that were found in his bedroom after his death	
"Bubbles"	Michael Jackson; Bryan Loren	One of around 20–25 songs recorded with Loren for the Dangerous album between 1989 and 1991; Instrumental track; The song's title was listed on an early configuration of the Dangerous album, dated April 19, 1990; Appears in a set of DATs found in a storage locker formerly owned by Loren in late 2024, alongside other tracks	
"Buffalo Bill"*	Michael Jackson	Written and recorded in 1983 during sessions for the Victory album; Jackson's first studio collaboration with John Barnes; Inspired by bison hunter William Cody; Failed to make the Victory and Bad albums; Two versions exist; one featuring background vocals from the Jacksons, and the other being a soloist version from Jackson, who delivers guiding vocals (using his full vocal range from very low to very high); Mentioned by Jackson during the 1983 "unauthorized interview": "We're doing a new album right now: the Jacksons album, and I'm writing several songs on it. The latest one I'm writing is called 'Buffalo Bill'; it's about Will Cody, the cowboy, and how he died."; As described by Bill Bottrell, the chorus lyrics include: "Who shot Buffalo Bill? They said he shot a lot, did he ever get killed?"	
"Butter Funk"^{(2010)}	Michael Jackson; Michael Durham Prince		
"California Grass"*	Michael Jackson		
"Call It Off"^{†}	Bryan Loren	One of around 20–25 songs recorded with Loren for the Dangerous album between 1989 and 1991; Appears in a set of DATs found in a storage locker formerly owned by Loren in late 2024, alongside other tracks	
"Can't Come Back"^{†}	Bryan Loren	One of around 20–25 songs recorded with Loren for the Dangerous album between 1989 and 1991; Appears in a set of DATs found in a storage locker formerly owned by Loren in late 2024, alongside other tracks	
"Change"	Steve Porcaro	Written and recorded in 2009; Presented to Jackson during the This Is It rehearsals; Vocals performed by Michael Sherwood; Steve Porcaro released a version featuring Michael McDonald in 2025	
"Changes"*^{(2009)}	Michael Jackson	Written and recorded with John Barnes during the early Bad sessions in 1985–1986; Described as "an upbeat piano-driven demo with rolling drum programming" and "incredibly catchy". Features a "really rough" scratch vocal with Jackson mumbling and humming a melody over the music, with the only discernible lyrics talking about "going through changes"; Revisited during the HIStory sessions, with an added gospel performance from the Andraé Crouch choir and a few ad-lib solos added; Full song leaked onto the internet in January 2026	
"Chicago 1945"*	Michael Jackson (lyrics); Steve Porcaro (music)	Written and recorded in late 1983 during the Victory sessions; A vocally complete song about three girls who went out and mysteriously disappeared throughout the night, with a hook of "never to be found again"; According to Porcaro, Jackson researched the significant events that occurred in 1930s and 1940s Chicago to write the lyrics; Live drums recorded in spring 1986.; Failed to make the Victory and Bad albums; According to author Bruce Najar, a version was allegedly worked on by Quincy Jones during the Bad sessions, but was never finished; Porcaro was approached by the estate about using it on Xscape, but declined to permit on the basis that the song didn't need any "contemporizing", and that he disapproved of the estate's "straight to remix" approach to Jackson's unreleased material; Porcaro continued to work on the song, resulting in a version with added horns and ad-libs dated to 2021; Said 2021 version was given to producer Brad Sundberg to be played in his seminars, and later leaked onto the internet in 2023; Considered for Thriller 40; Full song leaked in 2023	
"Children's Holiday"^{†}	Michael Jackson	Written in 1998 as a charity single after the 1995 Great Hanshin earthquake; Given to the Japanese fundraising supergroup J-Friends, along with "People of the World"; May or may have not been recorded by Jackson	
"Circles"	Unknown	Written and recorded during the HIStory sessions; Lacks any vocals from Jackson; A slave tape dated June 23, 1994, was put up for online auction in 2023	
"Crack Kills"*	Michael Jackson; Darryl McDaniels; Joseph Simmons	Recorded between November 1986 and January 1987 during the Bad sessions; Originally known as "Rap Song" during early sessions; Plans to include rapper duo Run-D.M.C. on a Westlake version fell through after Michael's pet Bubbles allegedly bit Jam Master Jay.; A solo version was recorded by Michael with full vocals in November 1986	
"Craze"	Michael Jackson	Written and recorded during the early 2000's; Was mentioned by Michael Durham Prince in a March 2017 episode of The MJCast; Is reportedly at least six minutes in runtime duration	
"Cry"*	Michael Jackson		
"D.I.E."^{(2010)}	Michael Jackson; Theron Feemster	Written between 2008 and 2009; Lacks any vocals from Jackson; Described as a "hard-hitting rock song with strong strings and a haunting bridge"	
"Dancing for Love"	Michael Jackson; RedOne	A CD was found on a court document investigating La Toya Jackson's boyfriend Jeffré Phillips, who was accused of stealing items owned by Michael upon his death; Producer RedOne has stated that he'll only release the track if all profits go to charity	
"Days in Gloucestershire"^{(2009)}	Michael Jackson; Brad Buxer	Written and recorded in 2004 at one of the Neverland Ranch's bungalows; Also known simply as "Gloucestershire"; Inspired by Jackson's visit with the Jackson 5 to Gloucestershire while on tour three decades earlier; it was still one of his fondest memories; Revisited in 2008 with added vocals, a new mix, and an alternate instrumental; 2004 version has a runtime of 4:33 minutes, while the 2008 one has a runtime of 4:36 minutes; 2004 version leaked onto internet in 2014 following the hacking of Sony's servers; 2008 version leaked onto internet in January 2026	
"Deep in the Night"	Michael Jackson; Skylark	Written and recorded in 1990 during the Dangerous sessions; The song's title was listed on an early configuration of the Dangerous album, dated April 19, 1990; Producer Bill Bottrell stated, "The writer came in on the last day. His name is Skylark. I don't know what his relationship [with Jackson] was. I did my best to fuss with it and make a mix."; Listed on notes consisting of songs Jackson wanted to finish that were found in his bedroom after his death	
"Diana Ross"	Unknown	Written and recorded circa 1994; A master tape for the song was put up for online auction in 2023	
"Doing Dirty"^{(1982)}	Michael Jackson; Marlon Jackson	Written in 1982	
"Don't Believe It"	Michael Jackson; Bryan Loren	One of around 20–25 songs recorded with Loren for the Dangerous album between 1989 and 1991; Recorded at Loren's house at "around the time of Thanksgiving or Christmas"; Features Jackson imitating the voice of journalists, saying things like "strange pictures" and the clicks of cameras; The song ends with a beatbox from Jackson, with a dialogue between him and Loren behind heard. The two were tired after their long session; Appears in a set of DATs found in a storage locker formerly owned by Loren in late 2024, alongside other tracks	
"Don't Make Me Stay"^{(2010)}	Michael Jackson; Theron Feemster	Written and recorded between 2008-2009; Features a scratch vocal from Jackson that sounds "distant"; Described as having a similar sound to Janet Jackson's "Runaway"	
"Dream Away"	Michael Jackson; Steve Porcaro	Written and recorded shortly after the release of the Thriller album in November 1982, according to Porcaro; Original recording consisted solely of Jackson's vocals and an electric piano track played by Porcaro; Described as being similar to "Human Nature" and "For All Time"; Failed to make the Victory album; Considered for Xscape, but Porcaro refused to let it get the "contemporized" treatment; In a recent interview with Porcaro, he confirms that he later added in drums and bass in addition to pitch-shifting Jackson's vocals to better fit the overdubs; A recording of the reworked song from a seminar leaked in 2022, with a different recording leaking in 2025	
"Dreaming"	Michael Jackson will.i.am	Recorded in 2006; Also known as "I'm Dreamin'"; Samples "I Can't Wake Up (I'm a Blunt)" by KRS-One; Chorus lyrics are: "I'm dreaming about being in love / I'm floating around and I just can't wake up"; will.i.am attempted to release the song in 2013, but was unable to receive approval to do so from the Estate	
"Dreams"	Michael Jackson	Written and possibly recorded during the late Dangerous sessions; May or may not have been intended for Pepsi's "Dreams" campaign to promote the album	
"Earth Love"	Michael Jackson	CD was found in Jackson's collection after his death, dated April 22, 2009; Found on a court document investigating La Toya Jackson's boyfriend Jeffré Phillips, who was accused of stealing items owned by Michael upon his death	
"Eaten Alive"	Michael Jackson; Maurice Gibb; Barry Gibb	Original version of the song written by the Gibb brothers, but was reworked by Jackson who was granted co-writer credits; Jackson recorded a demo version circa 1985, but it remains unreleased; Later recorded and released by Diana Ross	
"Ekan Satyam (The One Truth)"	A. R. Rahman; A. R. Parthasarathy; Kanika Myer Bharat	Recorded as a duet in 1999 by Jackson (singing in English) and Rahman (singing in Sanskrit); Created for the MJ and Friends concerts, but was pulled when Michael suffered an accident during the Munich, Germany show.	
"Elizabeth, I Love You"	Michael Jackson	Written and performed by Jackson as a tribute to his friend Elizabeth Taylor in 1997; A shorter, studio version is known to exist; Studio snippet leaked sometime in 2010	
"Faces"	Michael Jackson	Written and recorded in 1994 during the HIStory sessions; Lacks any vocals from Michael; Features a percussive groove performed by STOMP; The demo features a spoken intro which was intended to have been recorded by Nelson Mandela, but the 1993 child molestation allegations scared his advisors enough for them to strongly reconsider his involvement; Has a runtime of 5:57 minutes; Full song leaked in 2023	
"Family Thing"	Michael Jackson; Bryan Loren	Written and recorded in 1993 for the Addams Family Values film, but was cancelled due to contractual difficulties with Paramount Pictures; Originally presented to Jackson by Loren as an instrumental demo; A demo featuring complete vocals on the choruses and scratch vocals on the verses leaked onto the internet in 2023; A more complete version with a more fleshed out instrumental and backing vocals from Loren is known to exist, with snippets leaking in 2023; Original instrumental demo leaked onto the internet in 2026; Has a runtime of 3:55 and 4:12 minutes respectively	
"Fanfare Transition"^{(1992)}	Michael Jackson	Known alternatively as "Fanfare 1992"; Intended as an interlude or introduction piece for the Dangerous World Tour	
"Fantasy"*	Michael Jackson	Written and recorded in 1983; Failed to make the Victory album	
"Far, Far Away"*	Michael Jackson	Written and recorded circa 1983; Failed to make the Victory album; Sources fluctuate on how complete it is, some say that it is chorus vocals only, whereas others say that it is just scratch vocals throughout.	
"For the World"^{(2010)}	Michael Jackson; Theron Feemster		
"Garbage"	Michael Jackson; Bryan Loren	One of around 20–25 songs recorded with Loren for the Dangerous album between 1989 and 1991; Instrumental track; consists of car tyre screeches, low quality hits, and glass break snares; The song's title was listed on an early configuration of the Dangerous album, dated April 19, 1990; Supposedly inspired "Can't Let Her Get Away" and some other tracks produced by Teddy Riley	
"Get Around"*	Michael Jackson		
"Get Your Weight Off Me"	Michael Jackson; Rodney Jerkins; LaShawn Daniels; Fred Jerkins III	Written and recorded in 1999-2000 during the Invincible sessions; An updated mix was planned to be included on The Ultimate Collection; Interpolates the beat from Shabba Ranks's "Mr. Loverman"; Lyrically and melodically similar to "Invincible" and "Privacy"; LaShawn Daniels sings background vocals in the chorus; Has a runtime of 5:18 minutes; Snippets of the song had circulated on the internet since 2010; full song leaked onto the internet in 2024	
"Ghost of Another Lover"	Michael Jackson; Skylark	Written and recorded between 1989 and 1991 during the Dangerous sessions; Features additional synthesizer overdubs by Michael Boddicker; Appears on a handwritten list of songs considered for Dangerous under the title "Ghost"; Vocally incomplete; features scratch vocals from Jackson; Song is lyrically complete, with the lyrics leaking onto the internet in 2025; A CD dated April 29th, 2009 was found on a court document investigating La Toya Jackson's boyfriend Jeffré Phillips, who was accused of stealing items owned by Michael upon his death; The Dangerous version of the song was played by engineer Thom Russo at the Kingvention 2016 event; a recording of the song from the event leaked onto the internet in 2017.	
"Goin' to Rio"*	Michael Jackson	Written and recorded in the 1970s; Despite persistent rumors that Carole Bayer Sager co-wrote the track, she has denied ever working on it	
"Got to Find a Way Somehow"^{(1984)}	Michael Jackson	Written and recorded in 1979	
"Groove of Midnight"	Rod Temperton	Written during the Bad sessions; While a demo by Jackson was recorded, sources fluctuate on how much of the song was recorded; some involved with the production were even unaware Jackson recorded a demo; Song was later given to Siedah Garrett for her 1988 album Kiss of Life; A snippet of Jackson's demo surfaced on the internet in 2003	
"H2O"^{(2010)}	Michael Jackson; Theron Feemster	Written and recorded in 2008; Most popularly referred to as "Dark Lady"; Described as having an Arabic sound to the chorus and a bassline similar to Queen's "Under Pressure"; Demo has complete vocals on the choruses and scratch vocals on the verses; Lyrics include: "Dark lady will get what she wants every time, Dark lady don't know what she is."	
"Happy Birthday, Lisa"	Michael Jackson	Written and recorded for The Simpsons episode "Stark Raving Dad"; The song was performed by Kipp Lennon in the episode due to contractual agreements that only allowed Jackson to only use his speaking voice; Was scheduled for release on a special edition of the Dangerous album in 2001; however, the project was shelved; Version recorded by Jackson leaked onto the internet in 2002, with higher quality copies leaking in the late 2000s	
"Haven't Got a Lot"	Unknown	Written and recorded circa 1994; A slave tape for the song was put up for online auction in 2023	
"He Who Makes the Sky Gray"	Sheik Abdullah of Bahrain	Written and recorded in 2005; Recorded for the Bahrain-based Two Seas Records; Features vocals by Jackson	
"Heaven with a Smile"	Michael Jackson	Written and recorded circa 2009; A CD dated April 29th, 2009 was found on a court document investigating La Toya Jackson's boyfriend Jeffré Phillips, who was accused of stealing items owned by Michael upon his death	
"Holiday Inn"^{(1984)}	Michael Jackson	Written in 1976	
"Homeless Bound"	Michael Jackson	Written and recorded in 1990 during the Dangerous sessions; Consists of recordings of homeless people talking about their experiences; one of their testimonies reads as such: "I beg for change, I will not steal or sell drugs. See I got no money, I got nothing, I got no job, I'm on the street."; Described as being "very experimental and rough" and sonically similar to "Heal the World"; The song's title was listed on an early configuration of the Dangerous album, dated April 19, 1990	
"Hot Fun in the Summertime"	Sly Stone	Originally recorded between 1998 and 2003; according to estate executor John Branca, Jackson only recorded "a few lines"; Reworked for Xscape (2014) as a duet with Mary J. Blige and D'Angelo; Features Questlove on drums, Jesse Johnson on guitar, Pino Palladino on bass, Eric Leeds on horns, D'Angelo on sitar and keys; Produced by Russ Elevado and Ben Cane and co-produced by John McClain; Under consideration for a posthumous D'Angelo album	
"Hot Street"*	Rod Temperton	Written and recorded in 1982 during the Thriller sessions; Although Jackson favoured the song, Temperton and producer Quincy Jones felt that the song was too weak for inclusion, and it was subsequently replaced with "Baby Be Mine"; Full song was leaked onto the internet in 2002; The song's title was shown in the teaser trailer for the film Michael (2026)	
"How You Like Your Love"	Unknown	Written and recorded circa 1994; A master tape for the song was put up for online auction in 2023	
"I Am a Loser"^{(2009)}/"I Was the Loser"^{(2010)}	Michael Jackson; Brad Buxer	Written and recorded in January 2003 under the title of "I Am a Loser"; Updated in late 2008 as "I Was the Loser" when Jackson re-sang the choruses, featuring auto-tuned vocals; The 2003 version leaked onto the internet in 2013 following the hacking of Sony's servers, with the 2008 version leaking in 2025	
"I Forgive You"*	Michael Jackson		
"I Have This Dream"	Michael Jackson; David Foster; Carole Bayer Sager; Abdullah bin Hamad bin Isa Al Khalifa	Originally recorded in 1999 during the Invincible sessions; Reworked between 2005 and 2006; Conceived as a charity single after Hurricane Katrina and co-written with Abdullah bin Hamad bin Isa Al Khalifa, the second son of Hamad bin Isa Al Khalifa, the king of Bahrain. Singers James Ingram, Ciara, Snoop Dogg and Shirley Caesar recorded vocals in Los Angeles. In October 2005, Jackson recorded parts with an orchestra in Metropolis Studios in Chiswick, London, but never completed his vocals and did not attend further sessions. Abdullah said he had spent $2.2m on "I Have This Dream" and cited it, among other songs, in his lawsuit against Jackson in 2008; the parties settled out of court.; Demo recorded by an unknown male singer leaked in 2010	
"I Will Miss You"	Michael Jackson will.i.am	Recorded in 2006; Recorded at the Grouse Lodge studio in Westmeath, Ireland; A tribute to James Brown	
"I'm Peter Pan"	Michael Jackson; Buz Kohan	Written and recorded with Kohan in 1983 for an unproduced Peter Pan movie; Mentioned by Jackson during the 1983 "unauthorized interview", where he also sang a bit of the song	
"If You Don't Love Me"	Michael Jackson	Worked on with Bill Bottrell in 1989 during the Dangerous sessions, but was described by Bottrell as "a bit of an orphan" for the project; At least two versions exist; one with a runtime of 4:34 minutes, and another with a shorter runtime of 4:14 minutes which features richer instrumentation; Had been scheduled for release on a shelved special edition of the Dangerous album; Two updated mixes created by Bottrell for posthumous albums Michael (2010) and Xscape (2014) were considered, but didn't make the cut; Both versions leaked onto the internet in 2002 and 2007	
"In the Life of Chico"	Michael Jackson	Written in the 1970s; Lyric sheets for the song were sold at auction in 2009	
"In the Valley"*	Michael Jackson		
"Innocent Man"*^{(2009)}	Michael Jackson	Written and recorded in 1993; Only the choruses and a post chorus were recorded, though verses were written for the song; Considered instrumentally complete; The song was written shortly after the 1993 allegations against Jackson; lyrics consist of Michael singing how "God knows that i'm innocent now"; Listed on notes consisting of songs Jackson wanted to finish that were found in his bedroom after his death; Full song leaked onto the internet in January 2026	
"Iowa"	Michael Jackson	Classical piece mentioned by Janet Jackson in a 1993 magazine interview; In an interview, Janet Jackson talked about how Michael had fully orchestrated music, all of which Janet referred to as "songs to cry for," including Iowa. They were last seen on a cassette tape in his parents' home, Michael having left it just before heading off to film The Wiz	
"Janet and MJ Duet"	Unknown	Written and recorded during the Dangerous sessions; The song's title was listed on an early configuration of the Dangerous album, dated April 19, 1990	
"Jungle"^{(2009)}	Michael Jackson; Brad Buxer		
"Just Remember"^{(2009)}	Michael Jackson; Brad Buxer	Written and recorded in 2008; Also known as "Remember What I Told You"; Reportedly similar to "Speechless" in terms of tone; Song includes a scratch vocals by Jackson, featuring a short verse, multi-layered chorus, and finger snaps; Lyrics include: "Remember what I told you, and remember for all time"; Has a runtime of 90 seconds; Full song leaked onto the internet in January 2026.	
"Kentucky"*	Michael Jackson	Written and recorded in the 1970s; The song's title appears on an index card in the background of a behind-the-scenes clip of the film Michael (2026)	
"King Tutankhamun"^{(2010)}	Michael Jackson; Brad Buxer		
"Lady of Summer"^{(2010)}	Michael Jackson; Theron Feemster	Written and recorded in 2009; Lacks any vocals by Jackson; Is an orchestral piece created for an intended classical album	
"Light the Way"^{(2009)}	Michael Jackson; Brad Buxer; Sheik Abdullah of Bahrain	Recorded for the Bahrain-based Two Seas Records in 2005; Has a horn lead intro, with a choir featured in the chorus; Lacks any vocals from Jackson; Snippets leaked onto the internet in 2025 and the full song leaked in August 2026	
"Like You"	Unknown	Written and recorded circa 1994; also known as "Like U"; Multiple master tapes for the song were put up for online auction in 2023	
"Little Girls"*	Michael Jackson		
"Llama Lola"*	Michael Jackson		
"Lonely Bird"*	Michael Jackson	Listed on notes consisting of songs Jackson wanted to finish that were found in his bedroom after his death	
"Lonely Man"*	Michael Jackson		
"Lost in Love"	Unknown	Written and recorded circa 1994; Multiple slave tapes for the song were put up for online auction in 2023	
"Lovin You"^{(2010)}	Michael Jackson; Brad Buxer	Not to be confused with the former Bad sessions outtake released on Xscape (2014)	
"Lucy Is in Love with Linus"*	Michael Jackson		
"M.J. Melody"^{(1984)}	Michael Jackson	Written in 1982	
"Make a Wish"*	Michael Jackson; Buz Kohan	Written and recorded with Kohan in 1983 for an unproduced Peter Pan movie; features full orchestration; Considered vocally complete, as it was being played by director Steven Spielberg to his son as a lullaby	
"Make or Break"*	Michael Jackson; John Barnes	Recorded circa December 1985 during the early Bad sessions with John Barnes; Described by Matt Forger as having a "very driving, terrific hook, but never got finished"; Contains a reference vocal, a background vocal, and a reference bridge; Briefly revisited during the early Dangerous sessions with added overdubs, according to Bill Bottrell.	
"Man in Black"^{†}	Michael Jackson; Bryan Loren	One of around 20–25 songs recorded with Loren for the Dangerous album between 1989 and 1991; The song's title was listed on an early configuration of the Dangerous album, dated April 19, 1990; Full chorus was recorded by Jackson; however, no known verses were recorded; A later version possibly exists, featuring additional vocals from Jackson as described by a journalist during the album's creation.; Appears in a set of DATs found in a storage locker formerly owned by Loren in late 2024, alongside other tracks	
"Michael McKellar"*	Michael Jackson	Cited in Frank Cascio's book My Friend Michael: An Ordinary Friendship with an Extraordinary Man; According to Jackson's handwritten notes, the lyrics are "about child neglect" and the "pain children feel when they are ignored"; Lyrics include: "Waits at the window / Look how he's lying there" and "Pretends he's dying there / Nobody seems to care"; A CD was found on a court document investigating La Toya Jackson's boyfriend Jeffré Phillips, who was accused of stealing items owned by Michael upon his death	
"Michael's Affirmation"^{(2009)}	Michael Jackson; Brad Buxer	A spoken word piece recorded in October 2003, intended as a dedication for Roy Horn (of the duo of magicians Siegfried & Roy) to stay strong while recovering from the infamous tiger attack during a Las Vegas show; Set to an instrumental composition called "Photographs"; Snippets of the piece leaked onto the internet between 2023 and 2026; The full song leaked in August 2026	
"Monster"^{(2010)}	Michael Jackson; Brad Buxer	Not related to "Monster" on the Michael album.; Written and recorded between October 1997 and autumn 1998 during the Invincible sessions, but never made it onto the album.; Jackson seemingly only recorded vocals for the choruses: "You Created a Monster"; Described as a very "experimental" and "personal" song by CJ DeVillar, and described as having "the most complex Michael instrumental" by The MJCast.; Features an orchestra, a "huge amount of percussion", and "flies buzzing"; Briefly considered for The Ultimate Collection; Various snippets leaked onto the internet in 2024 and 2025	
"Neverland Landing"*^{(2009)}	Michael Jackson; Buz Kohan	Written and recorded with Kohan in 1983 for an unproduced Peter Pan movie; Described by Kohan: "We also wrote a song called 'Neverland Landing' which was done completely, and there is a demo with piano that I played at the house."; Has a runtime of 3:04 minutes; Full song leaked onto the internet in January 2026	
"New Jelly"	Unknown	Written and recorded circa 1994; A master tape for the song was put up for online auction in 2023	
"Nite Line"	Glen Ballard	Written and recorded in 1982 during the Thriller sessions, Was in contention to make the album, however it didn't compete with songs like "Billie Jean" and "Beat It"; Later recorded by the Pointer Sisters for their 1983 album Break Out, titled "Nightline"; Has a runtime of 4:55 minutes; Full song leaked onto the internet in 2002 alongside the original demo	
"Nymphette Lover"^{(1984)}	Michael Jackson	Written and recorded in 1981; The song's title appears on an index card in the background of a behind-the-scenes clip of the film Michael (2026)	
"Ode to Sorrow"^{(1984)}	Michael Jackson	Written and recorded in 1977	
"Oh Love"	Unknown	Written and recorded circa 1994; A master/slave tape for the song was put up for online auction in 2023	
"Pajamas"^{(2010)}	Michael Jackson; Brad Buxer	Instrumental track	
"People Have to Make Some Kind of Joke"*	Michael Jackson		
"People of the World"^{(1998)}	Michael Jackson	Written and recorded in 1998 as a charity single after the 1995 Great Hanshin earthquake; Given to the Japanese fundraising supergroup J-Friends, along with "Children's Holiday"; Full song leaked onto the internet in 2013	
"Photographs"^{(2010)}	Michael Jackson; Brad Buxer	An instrumental composition utilized in the background of a spoken word piece called "Michael's Affirmation"	
"Pray for Peace"^{(2009)}	Michael Jackson; Brad Buxer	Also known as "God Don't Love Us Anymore"; Written and recorded with Buxer sometime in the 2000s; Claimed to have been recorded between 2002 and 2003 by author Joseph Vogel; The full song leaked in August 2026 alongside the original instrumental	
"Pressure"^{†}	Michael Jackson; Bryan Loren	One of around 20–25 songs recorded with Loren for the Dangerous album between 1989 and 1991; Appears in a set of DATs found in a storage locker formerly owned by Loren in late 2024, alongside other tracks	
"Pressure"^{†}	Rodney Jerkins; Fred Jerkins III; Harvey Mason; LaShawn Daniels	Recorded between 1999 and 2001 during the Invincible sessions	
"Rampage"	Michael Jackson; Rodney Jerkins	Written and recorded in 1999 during the Invincible sessions; Demo features a guide vocal sung by LaShawn Daniels; lacks any vocals from Jackson	
"Red Eye"*^{(2010)}	Michael Jackson	Written and recorded sometime before 1993; Re-recorded with Theron "Neff-U" Feemster between 2008-2009; Possibly reworked in 2010 for the posthumous Michael album; Snippet leaked on August 29, 2025	
"Rescue Me"	Unknown	Written and recorded circa 1994; A master/slave tape for the song was put up for online auction in 2023	
"Revenge"	Michael Jackson	Written and recorded during the HIStory sessions; A mix tape dated to February 1995 was sold on eBay alongside other songs; Described as a very basic beat groove with no vocals	
"Rise Above It All"	Dr. Freeze	Written and recorded between 1998 and 1999 during the Invincible sessions; Described by Dr. Freeze: "It's an upbeat song. If you feel bad, if things are going wrong in the world, be positive and try to be as happy as possible, leaving aside all the negative things. Overcome negativity, go beyond the woes of the world, all wars, the starving children and all the bad things. Assemble yourselves, hold your hand, raise your hands to heaven and pass it all. It's a little theme song. I can not say whether he had recorded the song, but in any case, we worked on it. There are other songs on which they collaborated. Most of these songs are mid-tempo, but I can not say anything more."; Is the only song from the Dr. Freeze sessions to not have been leaked or released	
"Rock Tonight"	Michael Jackson	Instrumental track; Listed on notes consisting of songs Jackson wanted to finish that were found in his bedroom after his death	
"Rocker"^{(2009)}	Michael Jackson; Brad Buxer	Written and recorded in 2004; Described as being similar in composition to "We Will Rock You" by Queen; Features a guitar solo and complete vocals on the choruses with scratch vocals on the verses; Snippets have leaked onto the internet between 2024 and 2026	
"Rolling the Dice"*	Rod Temperton	Written and recorded between 1981 and 1982 during the Thriller sessions; Production of the song included Temperton and Quincy Jones as producers; Never went past the demo stage; while Jackson liked the track, Jones thought it wasn't strong enough for the album	
"Saturday Woman"	Michael Jackson	Cited by Frank Cascio's in his book My Friend Michael: An Ordinary Friendship with an Extraordinary Man; Described by Cascio: "One of the unreleased songs that I loved the most was 'Saturday Woman', about a girl who wants attention and goes out to party instead of spending time on her relationship."; Vocally incomplete; Cascio described the verse lyrics: "I don't want to say that I don't love you, I don't want to say that I disagree", while the chorus lyrics include: "She's a saturday woman. I don't want to live my life all alone. She's a saturday woman."	
"Saved by the Bell"*	Michael Jackson; Jermaine Jackson		
"Seduction"^{†}	Shelby Lee Myrick III	Recorded in the early 2000s	
"Seeing Voices"	Michael Jackson; Ray Charles; Sidney Fine	Written and recorded in 1997 during the early Invincible sessions; One of the first tracks made for Invincible, alongside "Bio"; Features Charles' choir on the background vocals; The song was premiered at a party in 1999; Has a runtime of 4:43 minutes; Full song leaked onto internet in 2015	
"Serious Effect"^{†}	Michael Jackson; Bryan Loren	One of around 20–25 songs recorded with Loren for the Dangerous album between 1989 and 1991; Features rap by LL Cool J; One of two songs worked on with LL Cool J during the Dangerous sessions, the other being "Truth on Youth"; Edited for a scheduled release on a shelved special edition of the Dangerous album in 2001; Appears in a set of DATs found in a storage locker formerly owned by Loren in late 2024, alongside other tracks	
"Set It On Out"^{(1982)}	Michael Jackson	Written in 1982; Registered at the Library of Congress; may not be registered by Michael, but rather someone else with his name and middle initial, however nothing is confirmed	
"Seven Digits"^{†}	Michael Jackson; Bryan Loren	One of around 20–25 songs recorded with Loren for the Dangerous album between 1989 and 1991; The song was considered for inclusion on Blood on the Dance Floor: HIStory in the Mix; however, due to time constraints, "Superfly Sister" was chosen instead as it was more complete and demanded less time to finish; A DAT containing the song alongside a "an extensive 1-hour and 13-minute session of Michael Jackson's practice and workout routines" was put up for online auction in February 2024; Appears in a set of DATs found in a storage locker formerly owned by Loren in late 2024, alongside other tracks	
"She Don't Love Me"	Michael Jackson	Written and recorded in 2008; Described as having a "computer-generated video game music" sound; Lyrics include: "She don't love me / She don't want me / She don't need me / She doesn't care / She doesn't care"	
"She Got It"^{†}	Michael Jackson; Bryan Loren	One of around 20–25 songs recorded with Loren for the Dangerous album between 1989 and 1991; The song's title was listed on an early configuration of the Dangerous album, dated April 19, 1990; Edited for a scheduled release on a shelved special edition of the Dangerous album in 2001; Appears in a set of DATs found in a storage locker formerly owned by Loren in late 2024, alongside other tracks	
"She's Got It Baby"	Bryan Loren	One of around 20–25 songs recorded with Loren for the Dangerous album between 1989 and 1991; Appears in a set of DATs found in a storage locker formerly owned by Loren in late 2024, alongside other tracks	
"She's Not a Girl"*	Michael Jackson; Jermaine Jackson		
"Shut Up and Dance"^{†}	Michael Jackson; Michael Durham Prince; Eric Kirkland	Written and recorded by Eric Kirkland in 2008; features no vocals from Jackson; Listed on notes consisting of songs Jackson wanted to finish that were found in his bedroom after his death; Main lyrics are "Stop thinkin' 'bout folks starin' at you, that's too much to bare (Shut up and dance). Those drama talkers ain't thinkin' 'bout-chu so why should you care? Shut up and dance, Shut up and dance"	
"Silent Spring"^{(2010)}	Michael Jackson; Theron Feemster	Instrumental track	
"Sister Sue"*	Michael Jackson		
"Slapstick"	Rod Temperton	Original demo of "Hot Street", recorded in 1982 during the Thriller sessions; Co-produced with Quincy Jones; Features completely different lyrics than "Hot Street"; Has a runtime of 3:35 minutes; Full demo leaked onto internet in low quality sometime in the early 2010s	
"Somewhere in Time"^{(1984)}	Michael Jackson	Written and recorded in 1980 for the Triumph album; A work tape of the song was played during a deposition in 1984	
"Son of Thriller"	Michael Jackson; Bryan Loren	A remix track featuring excerpts from "Thriller", "Don't Stop 'Til You Get Enough", "Wanna Be Startin' Somethin'" and "Billie Jean" created during the early Dangerous sessions; Appears in a set of DATs found in a storage locker formerly owned by Loren in late 2024, alongside other tracks	
"Spice of Life"	Rod Temperton; Derek Bramble	Written and recorded between 1981 and 1982 during the Thriller sessions; Was in the running for Thriller, but wasn't included on the final album; Later given to the Manhattan Transfer	
"Stand Tall"^{(1985)}	Michael Jackson	Written and recorded in 1982; Lacks any vocals from Jackson; features vocals from an unknown singer	
"Starlight"	Michael Jackson	Written and recorded in 1994 during the HIStory sessions; Not to be confused with the original demo of "Thriller", later released on Thriller 40 (2022)	
"Stay"^{†}	Michael Jackson; Bryan Loren	Written sometime between 1989 and 1991 during the Dangerous sessions	
"Still the King"	Michael Jackson will.i.am	Recorded in 2006; Recorded at the Grouse Lodge studio in Westmeath, Ireland; Also known as "I'm Still the King"; A snippet of "Still the King" is rumored to have been featured in the 2006 interview with Access Hollywood	
"Susie"^{(1984)}	Michael Jackson	Written and recorded in 1978 as a home demo; Early version of "Little Susie (Pie Jesu)"; Said to sound the same as the HIStory version, with a very similar vocal performance from Jackson	
"Thank Heaven"^{(1998)}	Michael Jackson	Written and recorded in 1998; Sonically resembles a nursery rhyme; Jackson only delivers a spoken-word passage on the intro, with the entire song being sung by an unknown female artist; The full song leaked in August 2026	
"Thank You for Life"*^{(1984)}	Michael Jackson	The date of the song's creation is disputed; Jackson stated that it was recorded in 1973/1974, while the U.S. Copyright Office states it was recorded in 1976; Was played during a deposition in 1984	
"That"^{(1998)}	Michael Jackson	Written during the Invincible sessions; Is an instrumental demo with no vocals from Jackson	
"The Children's Hour"*	Michael Jackson	Described as a "children's song" by Damien Shields	
"The Sky Is the Limit"*	Michael Jackson	Written with one of Jackson's brothers	
"The World Is No Church"^{†}	Andrea Martin; Walter Afanasieff	Written and recorded in 1999 during Invincible sessions	
"Thinking About You"	Unknown	Written and recorded circa 1994; A master tape for the song was put up for online auction in 2023	
"Throwin' Your Life Away"^{(1988)}	Michael Jackson	Written and recorded in 1986 and 1988 during the Bad and Dangerous sessions; According to co-producer Bill Bottrell, a different version of the song was originally recorded on December 15th and 16th, 1986, before being scrapped and replaced by a second version by December 22nd; Vocals weren't recorded until September 8th, 1988 after the Bad sessions; the song was further worked on; Listed on notes consisting of songs Jackson wanted to finish that were found in his bedroom after his death; Original 1988 version was remixed by Neff-U in 2010 and retitled "(Stop) Throwing Your Life Away"; was considered for inclusion on the Michael album, but didn't make the final cut; Both 1988 and 2010 versions leaked onto internet in 2025	
"Tomboy"*^{(1985)}	Michael Jackson	Written and recorded in late 1985 with John Barnes during the early Bad sessions; Described as having a melody identical to the "I bet you remember" line in Remember the Time; Confirmed to be vocally complete and ready for release; An instrumental version has been registered in the Library of Congress; Features Roger Troutman as a guest musician; According to studio engineer Matt Forger, Jackson gave the song's multitracks to Troutman, who gave them to funk band Zapp	
"Tragedy of a Cheerleader"*	Michael Jackson		
"Truth on Youth"	Michael Jackson; Bryan Loren	One of around 20–25 songs recorded with Loren for the Dangerous album between 1989 and 1991; Also known as "Truth About Youth"; features rap by LL Cool J; One of two songs worked on with LL Cool J during the Dangerous sessions, the other being "Serious Effect"; Appears in a set of DATs found in a storage locker formerly owned by Loren in late 2024, alongside other tracks	
"Turnin' Me Off"*	Michael Jackson	Recorded on January 29th, 1986, with vocals recorded on October 30th, 1986, during the Bad sessions; Produced with Bill Bottrell and John Barnes; Features scratch vocals, with completed choruses, a completed bridge, and a completed first and third chorus; Described as having "an electro sound to it, which was so punchy that the bass track had to be left out of the mix"; Described by Bottrell to be a "weird little thing, very unlikeable"; Described as "one of Michael's edgier experiments" and "very groove-oriented" by Matt Forger; Cited in Frank Cascio's book My Friend Michael: An Ordinary Friendship with an Extraordinary Man; Revisited during early Dangerous sessions between July 20th and November 6th, 1989, according to Bill Bottrell; Rework features a "piccolo trumpet" and background vocals by Siedah Garrett; Large portion of 1986 version leaked onto the internet in 2025	
"U Know"	Unknown	Written and recorded circa 1994; Multiple master tapes for the song were put up for online auction in 2023	
"Under Your Skin"^{(1984)}	Michael Jackson	Written and recorded in 1979	
"Unknown"^{†}	Michael Jackson		
"Verdict"^{†}	Michael Jackson; Bryan Loren	One of around 20–25 songs recorded with Loren for the Dangerous album between 1989 and 1991; Repurposes elements from Janet Jackson's unreleased song "Work", which was later reworked by Loren as "For You" for his 1992 album Music From The New World; Background vocals were written by Michael, yet never recorded; Reworked in 1994 during the HIStory sessions under the title "The Verdict"; The beat and full instrumental of the 1994 version leaked onto the internet in 2023	
"Victory"	Michael Jackson; Freddie Mercury	One of three demos worked on with Mercury at Jackson's home studio in 1983, along with "There Must Be More to Life Than This" and "State of Shock".; The foundation of the track was laid with Mercury's personal assistant Peter Freestone banging on the toilet door in perfect time for five minutes.; Was meant to be included on Queen's Forever album in 2014, but was blocked by the estate	
"Walk Away"^{(2010)}	Michael Jackson; Brad Buxer	Instrumental track	
"Water"^{(2010)}	Michael Jackson; Theron Feemster	Recorded in 2008 at the Carolwood house; The production is complex, with water droplets and a "Stranger in Moscow" aesthetic; Only a chorus was ever recorded; Has a runtime of 2:59 minutes; Multiple snippets of the song leaked online between 2023 and 2026	
"We Are the Ones"^{(1984)}	Michael Jackson	Written and recorded in 1978	
"We Be Ballin'"	Ice Cube; DMX; Clark Kent	Written in 1997 and recorded in 1998; A remixed version of "We Be Clubbin'"; Features Shaquille O'Neal on the intro and the verses, with Jackson singing the choruses; This remix was to be released on an NBA compilation album scheduled for the end of 1998 and was also going to be featured in commercials for NBA's "I Love This Game" campaign. The entire project was shelved due to the 1998–99 NBA lockout; Full song leaked onto the internet in 2008, along with a demo and a remix; This song is the last song to leak prior to Michael Jackson's death in 2009	
"What Do You Want from Me"	Unknown	Written and recorded circa 1994; A master tape for the song was put up for online auction in 2023	
"What You Do to Me"^{(1985)}	Michael Jackson	Written and recorded in 1985 during the early Bad sessions; Song is considered to be vocally completed; Described as very similar to "Free" and "I'm So Blue"; A completely different song with the same title was registered with the United States Copyright Office in 1998	
"What's It Gonna Be"^{†}	Michael Jackson	Not to be confused with "What's It Gonna Be?!", recorded by Jackson's sister Janet and Busta Rhymes	
"What's Your Life"*	Michael Jackson; Jermaine Jackson	Written and possibly recorded between 1982 and 1983 at Tito Jackson's house and Encino; Lyrics of the song were cited in Jermaine Jackson's book	
"Who Is the Girl with Her Hair Down"*	Michael Jackson		
"Why Can't I Be"^{(1984)}	Michael Jackson	Written and recorded in 1980 for the Jacksons' Triumph album; The song's title appears on an index card in the background of a behind-the-scenes clip of the film Michael (2026)	
"Why Shy"*	Michael Jackson		
"Willing and Waiting"	Kenneth "Babyface" Edmonds	Written and recorded in 1994 to present to Jackson for possible inclusion on HIStory, with Babyface heavily involved in the production. One of two songs he presented to Jackson, the other being "Why" (later given to 3T); Despite being referred to as a demo, the song was quite developed with background vocals, polished instrumentation and completed lyrics, and is considered to be "radio-ready"; According to assistant engineer Brad Sundberg, "Michael was looking to push things pretty hard on HIStory [and] 'Willing and Waiting' was maybe a bit softer than the direction he was going."; Full song leaked onto the internet on January 28, 2023; Leak stems from a DAT dated August 16th, 1994	
"Work That Body"^{†}	Michael Jackson; Bryan Loren; Berry Gordy; Freddie Perren; Alphonzo Mizell; Deke Richards	One of around 20–25 songs recorded with Loren for the Dangerous album between 1989 and 1991; The song's title was listed on an early configuration of the Dangerous album, dated April 19, 1990; Edited for a scheduled release on a shelved special edition of the Dangerous album in 2001; Borrows the "Sit down girl, I think I love you/no, get up girl, show me what you can do" line from the Jackson 5's "ABC". According to Loren, Jackson initially refused to sing that line, but "realized the tongue-in-cheek fun contained behind it"; Appears in a set of DATs found in a storage locker formerly owned by Loren in late 2024, alongside other tracks	
"World of Candy"^{(2009)}	Michael Jackson; Brad Buxer	Written and recorded circa 2003; Featuring Nisha Kataria; Described as a children's song; Full song leaked in January 2026	
"You Ain't Gonna Change Nothin'"*^{(1984)}	Michael Jackson	Written and recorded in 1975	
"You Are a Liar"*	Michael Jackson		
"You Are There"^{(2010)}	Michael Jackson; Brad Buxer	Instrumental track	
"You Don't Love Me"	Michael Jackson; Rodney Jerkins; LaShawn Daniels	Written and recorded in 1998 during the Invincible sessions; Demo features a spoken intro by Jerkins and a guide vocal sung by Daniels; Described as having a similar sound to Brandy's "Angel in Disguise"; Inspired the song "It's Not Worth It" on Brandy's Full Moon album	
"You Told Me Your Lovin'"^{(1984)}	Michael Jackson	Written in 1979	
"You Were There"	Michael Jackson		

== See also ==
- List of songs recorded by Michael Jackson
- List of songs recorded by the Jackson 5
