= Michael Jackson's Halloween =

- Written by: Mark A.Z. Dippé; Scott Clevenger; Tim Hill; Dave Johnson
- Directed by: Mark A.Z. Dippé; Kyung Ho Lee
- Starring: Lucas Till; Kiersey Clemons; Jim Parsons; George Eads; Alan Cumming; Christine Baranski; Lucy Liu; Brad Garrett; Michael Jackson
- Countries of origin: United States; South Korea
- Original language: English

Production
- Executive producers: John Branca; John McClain; Liz Young; Mike Young
- Producer: Daniel Chuba
- Editor: Aaron Seelman
- Running time: 70 minutes
- Production companies: Optimum Productions; Splash Entertainment; Hammerhead Productions

Original release
- Network: CBS
- Release: October 27, 2017

Michael Jackson's Halloween is a one-hour animated television special that premiered on CBS on October 27, 2017. It was produced by Splash Entertainment.

The cast of voice actors includes Lucas Till, Kiersey Clemons, Jim Parsons, George Eads, Alan Cumming, Christine Baranski, Lucy Liu, and Brad Garrett. The special also features Michael Jackson's music, and a dance finale depicting Jackson himself.

The special was produced in collaboration with the Michael Jackson estate. John Branca and John McClain, co-executors of the estate, serve as executive producers. It is produced by Daniel Chuba and directed by Mark A.Z. Dippé. The special was created and produced by Optimum Productions, the company owned by the estate, with animation production by the Seoul-based VFX studio Hammerhead Productions.

== Plot ==
A young man and woman, Vincent (Lucas Till) and Victoria (Kiersey Clemons), cross paths on Halloween night. As a result of their meeting, they and Victoria's boss' dog, Ichabod, find themselves in a "magical adventure of personal discovery" at the This Place Hotel, located at 777 Jackson Street. They meet the bellhop chimp Bubbles (Brad Garrett), the scarecrow groundskeeper Hay Man (Jim Parsons), spider security guard Generalissimo Meriweather (Alan Cumming), and mad scientist cat Franklin Stein (Diedrich Bader) who they join in stopping the tyrannical witch Conformity (Lucy Liu) from getting rid of music and dancing.

The story culminates in a dance finale featuring an animated version of Michael Jackson himself (voiced using his music and archival recordings).

== Characters ==
- Michael Jackson - the King of Pop himself and a mysterious magical figure who creates 777 Jackson Street This Place Hotel who aids Vincent and Victoria in defeating Conformity, encouraging them to follow their dreams. Possesses the power to transform into various creatures and the ability to undo the effects of Conformity's magic.
- Bubbles (voiced by Brad Garrett) - Michael's talking chimp and chauffeur who works as a bellhop at the This Place Hotel. He acts as Vincent and Victoria's guide through the hotel using a magical elevator.
- Vincent (voiced by Lucas Till) - a young store clerk who wishes to be a DJ but his father wants him to take over the family business.
- Victoria (voiced by Kiersey Clemons) - a young intern who gave up dancing to be an intern at a big corporation run by her boss Mrs. Grau.
- Ichabod - Mrs. Grau's dog who Victoria ends up walking and joins the pair in their adventure. He is nicknamed Icky by Victoria.
- Conformity (voiced by Lucy Liu) - a tyrannical witch who rules over the inhabitants of the This Place Hotel. She forces them to conform under the threat of turning those who defy her into zombies forbidding dancing and wishes to destroy music.
- Hay Man (voiced by Jim Parsons) - the magical scarecrow groundskeeper with a pumpkin for a head who aids Vincent and Victoria.
- Generalissimo Meriweather (voiced by Alan Cumming) - the spider head of security who works for Conformity and leads an army of spider guards. Like Vincent, he comes from a long line of spider security guards. Victoria tricks him into dancing after stating she could do better. After one of his soldiers takes a blast of magic from Conformity to protect Generalissimo, he rebels against Conformity.
- Franklin Stein (voiced by Diedrich Bader) - a mad scientist cat who works for Conformity and built a machine that destroys music. However, after he is captured by Vincent and Victoria, he reveals that he really wanted to make music before meeting Conformity and joins forces with the pair who use his machine to summon Michael Jackson.
- Vincent's Dad (voiced by George Eads) - a grocery store owner and manager who wants Vincent to follow in his footsteps and takeover the family business. However, he apparently has a change of heart as he is later seen at Vincent and Victoria's concert.
- Mrs. Grau (voiced by Christine Baranski) - Victoria's boss and owner of Ichabod who she dotes on. She gives Victoria the task of walking Ichabod, promising her a promotion. She and Ichabod later attend Vincent and Victoria's concert.

== Music ==
This Halloween animated special features 28 songs, including some remixes, from Michael Jackson and The Jacksons catalogue, re-imagined and remixed by former Immortal World Tour and Michael Jackson: One producer Kevin Antunes.

Song	Year	Album	Notes
"Smooth Criminal"	1987	Bad	
"Don't Stop 'Til You Get Enough"	1979	Off The Wall	New remix combining both the Immortal and One remix.
"Stranger In Moscow"	1995	HIStory: Past, Present and Future, Book I	
"Is It Scary"	1997	Blood on the Dance Floor: HIStory in the Mix	
"Heartbreaker"	2001	Invincible	Instrumental of album version.
"This Place Hotel"	1980	Triumph	Instrumental version of Immortal version.
"Xscape"	2014	Xscape	Remixed with "Somebody's Watching Me".; Instrumental version is also used in creating the new remix.
"Somebody's Watching Me"	1984	Somebody's Watching Me	Remixed with "Xscape".; Michael's lead vocals only.
"Billie Jean"	1982	Thriller	Appears in the end of "Xscape X Somebody's Watching Me".; Remixed with "Torture" on the third appearance of the latter song.
"Human Nature"	1982	Thriller	Instrumental version of Immortal version.
"Thriller"	1982	Thriller	New remix combining the Immortal, One and Stranger Thing remix.; Vincent Price's laughing is used several times apart from the dance fight part.
"Earth Song"	1995	HIStory: Past, Present And Future - Book I	SFX and strings only.
"Dangerous"	1991	Dangerous	Remixed with "Jam".
"Jam"	1991	Dangerous	Remixed with "Dangerous".
"Working Day And Night"	1979	Off The Wall	Instrumental version of One version.
"Dirty Diana"	1987	Bad	Instrumental version of One version.
"Bad"	1987	Bad	Both album version and cello-only version are used in different scenes.
"Beat It"	1982	Thriller	Similar to the Immortal remix but features different drums and guitars.
"They Don't Care About Us"	1995	HIStory: Past, Present And Future - Book I	Remixed with "Threatened".; Both instrumental version and Immortal version are used in creating the new remix.
"Threatened"	2001	Invincible	Remixed with "They Don't Care About Us".; Both instrumental version and Immortal version are used in creating the new remix.
"Heal the World"	1991	Dangerous	
"Blood on the Dance Floor"	1997	Blood on the Dance Floor: HIStory in the Mix	One version.
"Slave to the Rhythm"	2014	Xscape	
"Torture"	1984	Victory	New remix, no lead vocals from Michael or Jermaine is included, only falsettos from Jackie.; Remixed with "Billie Jean" on the third appearance.
"Ghosts"	1997	Blood on the Dance Floor: HIStory in the Mix	
"2000 Watts"	2001	Invincible	Instrumental of album version.
"Childhood"	1995	HIStory: Past, Present And Future - Book I	Instrumental of album version.
"Will You Be There"	1991	Dangerous	

== Production ==
John Branca had an extensive period working with Michael Jackson that started in 1980, which included work on the singer's iconic Thriller music video. Branca claimed the singer "loved Halloween", as he incorporated horror imagery in Thriller as well as another one of his short films named Ghosts; in 2016, this plus a recurring re-interest of Thriller every halloween influenced the idea of a halloween special featuring Jackson's music, "something that Michael wanted to do" according to Branca, into the minds of Branca and director Mark A.Z. Dippé.

Some of the film's companies and production staff previously collaborated with Jackson in the past; song compiler Kevin Antunes was involved as musical designer in the artist's Cirque du Soleil shows, while Jackson had recorded for CBS' record division (now Sony Music) and worked with the company on other projects. The dancers and choreographers who worked on the motion capture-animated dance segments were also Jackson veterans. CBS was involved in the casting, recommending actors such as Lucy Liu, Jim Parsons and Alan Cumming. L.L. Cool J was also approached for the project, although doesn't appear in the special.

== Marketing ==
A sneak preview of the special was shown on October 5, 2017 at the New York Comic Con, which was followed by a Q&A panel with the creators.

== Reception ==
On its premiere airing, the special was watched by 5.67 million viewers. The special was broadcast again in 2018 and was watched by 2.03 million viewers.
