= HIStory (song) =

Single by Michael Jackson

from the album Blood on the Dance Floor: HIStory in the Mix
- A-side: "Ghosts"
- Released: July 30, 1997
- Recorded: February 5, 1994 – March 28, 1995 (original version); 1997 (remix)
- Genre: Pop; sound collage; disco (remix)
- Length: 4:01 (radio edit); 6:37 (original album version); 8:00 (remix album version)
- Label: Epic
- Songwriters: Michael Jackson; Jimmy Jam and Terry Lewis
- Producers: Michael Jackson; Jimmy Jam and Terry Lewis

Michael Jackson singles chronology
"Blood on the Dance Floor" (1997)	"HIStory" / "Ghosts" (1997)	"Is It Scary" (1997)

Licensed audio
- "HIStory" (original version) on YouTube
- "HIStory" (remix) on YouTube

"HIStory" is a 1995 song by American singer-songwriter Michael Jackson. It was composed by Jackson, James Harris III and Terry Lewis, and was included on his album HIStory: Past, Present and Future, Book I. Although the original version of "HIStory" was not released as a single, it was later remixed in 1997 as part of Jackson's remix album Blood on the Dance Floor: HIStory in the Mix. These remixes would be released as part of "HIStory" / "Ghosts", a double A-side single with the newly recorded song "Ghosts" as the second single from that album.

== Production ==
"HIStory" was written and composed by Michael Jackson, James Harris III and Terry Lewis. It was released as the thirteenth track on the studio album HIStory, but was not released as a single. The song sampled multiple musical compositions and historical audio quotes, all of which were dispersed throughout the track. Early in the track, one included quotes from an interview with a young Michael Jackson from 1970. Musical compositions sampled include "Beethoven Lives Upstairs" and "The Great Gate of Kiev" from Mussorgsky's Pictures at an Exhibition. In reissues of the album, the Pictures at an Exhibition piece was replaced by a similar improvised orchestra piece, but the original sample was used in Jackson's live performances in the HIStory World Tour. Audio quotes sampled were Lowell Thomas's "Charles Lindbergh Report" of Lindbergh's 1927 landing in Paris, a report on Hank Aaron, Ted Kennedy's 1968 eulogy for brother Robert F. Kennedy, the 1939 "Farewell to Baseball" by Lou Gehrig, the 1940 "Greetings to the Children of England" radio address by Princess Elizabeth and Princess Margaret, quotes from Muhammad Ali, Thomas Edison, and Dr. Martin Luther King Jr.'s 1963 speech "I Have a Dream".

Music writer Mark Sinker described "HIStory" as less a song than an extended sound montage of "overlapping sound-clips: national anthems, martial music, selected radio announcements at totemic moments, the speeches of the great, Edison testing the first phonograph, Neil Armstrong about to moonwalk, a chorus that's a rewrite of 'Blowin' in the Wind'. As [an] artist's signature, a clip of a child's voice: 'Whatever I sing, that's what I really mean. I don't sing it if I don't mean it'." Billboard writer Morgan Eros included the song in a list of those which sample King Jr. He described the HIStory album as "something of a head-scratcher, in which a troubled celebrity responds to his legal problems by constructing a pyramid to himself." In this regard, he deemed the title track, with its samples of King, Malcolm X, Edison, Armstrong and Ali, to "[play] like an attempt to seal Jackson in the pantheon of 20th century greats, as the ground was crumbling beneath his feet." In a separate list of songs that sample King's "I Have a Dream" speech, MTV News deemed "HIStory" to be a "magisterial pop tune, which opens with a royal horn flourish and features bits of speeches about Hank Aaron, Robert Kennedy and snippets of Muhammad Ali and Malcolm X."

In 1997, Jackson issued the remix album Blood on the Dance Floor: HIStory in the Mix. Remixes were done by Tony Moran, Mark Picchiotti, and The Ummah, although only one of Tony Moran's remixes, titled "HIStory (Tony Moran's HIStory Lesson)" was included on the album. This and the rest of the remixes were included on various commercial and promotional releases of the double A-side release "HIStory" / "Ghosts", the second single from the album. In his British chart column for Dotmusic, James Masterton wrote that, following the success of Jackson's previous single "Blood on the Dance Floor", the release of the "HIStory" remix "further halts Jacko's early-decade slide into self-cliche and instead presents him as the master of the late 90s pop record." Billboard reviewer Larry Flick wrote: "By rebuilding the song into a hands-in-the-air disco anthem, Tony Moran provides the remix that will appeal to many listeners."

== Music video ==
The music video that accompanied the remix opens with the scene of a woman, relaxing on a futuristic sofa, watching the music video through metallic virtual reality goggles. The video is set in a nightclub. Inside the club, televisions, monitors and walls display the history of Jackson's filmography such as "Don't Stop 'Til You Get Enough", "Rock with You", "Beat It", "The Way You Make Me Feel", "Man in the Mirror", "Dirty Diana", "Smooth Criminal", "Black or White", "Remember the Time", "In the Closet", "Jam", "Will You Be There", "Scream", "Earth Song", "They Don't Care About Us", "Stranger in Moscow", "Blood on the Dance Floor", scenes from his short film Ghosts, and live performances from the Bad and Dangerous tours. Wearing the goggles, the woman is led to believe she is in the nightclub too. The video ends with the woman removing the goggles.

== Chart performance ==
"HIStory" / "Ghosts" did generally well in music charts worldwide, having charted within the top-ten and top-twenty in multiple countries. In the Netherlands, Belgium and Sweden "HIStory" / "Ghosts" spent 17 to 18 weeks on the charts. In Australia "HIStory" / "Ghosts" peaked at 43 before falling off the chart. The single did not appear on any United States Billboard charts.

Masterton said of the "HIStory" / "Ghosts" single reaching number five in the UK Singles Chart, giving Jackson his eighth consecutive Top 5 hit: "When you consider that the normal marketing strategy of endlessly mining albums for singles normally results in ever low chart placings this is nothing short of incredible."

== Track listing ==
CD single

1. "HIStory" (7" HIStory Lesson Edit) – 4:08
2. "HIStory" (Mark!'s Radio Edit) – 4:16
3. "HIStory" (Mark!'s Vocal Club Mix) – 9:11
4. "HIStory" (The Ummah Radio Mix) – 5:00
5. "HIStory" (The Ummah DJ Mix) – 3:04
6. "HIStory" (The Ummah Main A Cappella) – 4:06
7. "Ghosts" (Radio Edit) – 3:50

12" single

1. "Ghosts" (Mousse T's Club Mix) – 6:03
2. "Ghosts" (Mousse T's Radio Rock) – 4:25
3. "HIStory" (Tony Moran's HIStorical Dub) – 7:56
4. "HIStory" (7" HIStory Lesson Edit) – 4:09

== Remixes ==
The Ummah mixes

- "HIStory" (The Ummah Radio Mix) – 5:00
- "HIStory" (The Ummah Urban Mix) – 4:19
- "HIStory" (The Ummah DJ Mix) – 3:04
- "HIStory" (The Ummah Main A Cappella) – 4:06

Tony Moran mixes

- "HIStory" (Tony Moran's HIStory Lesson) – 8:01
- "HIStory" (Tony Moran's HIStorical Dub) – 7:56
- "HIStory" (Tony Moran's 7" HIStory Lesson Edit) – 4:08

Mark Picchiotti mixes

- "HIStory" (Mark!'s Vocal Club Mix) – 9:11
- "HIStory" (Mark!'s Keep Movin' Dub) – 9:16
- "HIStory" (Mark!'s Radio Edit) – 4:16

Note: The Mark Picchiotti remixes were alternatively titled "HIStory" (Mark!'s Phly Vocal) and "HIStory" (Mark!'s Future Dub) on certain releases, notably a few widely distributed promo records in the United Kingdom.

== Charts ==
All entries charts as "HIStory / Ghosts" except where noted.

=== Weekly charts ===
Chart (1997)	Peak position
Australia (ARIA)	43
Austria (Ö3 Austria Top 40)	36
Belgium (Ultratop 50 Flanders)	17
Belgium (Ultratop 50 Wallonia)	10
Europe (European Hot 100)	11
Finland (Suomen virallinen lista)	16
France (SNEP)	26
Germany (GfK)	14
Hungary (Mahasz)	2
Ireland (IRMA)	16
Netherlands (Dutch Top 40)	16
Netherlands (Single Top 100)	14
New Zealand (Recorded Music NZ)	29
Scottish Singles Sales (Official Charts)	4
Spain (AFYVE)	4
Sweden (Sverigetopplistan)	12
Switzerland (Schweizer Hitparade)	16
UK Singles (Official Charts)	5

=== Year-end charts ===
Chart (1997)	Position
Germany (Media Control)	58
Sweden (Topplistan)	86

== Personnel ==
Tony Moran's HIStory Lesson remix

- Written and composed by Michael Jackson, James Harris III and Terry Lewis
- Produced by Michael Jackson, Jimmy Jam & Terry Lewis
- Remix by Tony Moran
- Additional production by Tony Moran and Bob Rosa
- Mixed by Bob Rosa
- Engineered and programming by Tony Coluccio
- Additional programming by Giuseppe D.
- Vocals by Michael Jackson and Boyz II Men
- Ending solo vocal by Leah Frazier

== See also ==
- List of anti-war songs

== Bibliography ==
- George, Nelson (2004). Michael Jackson: The Ultimate Collection booklet. Sony BMG.
- Lewis, Jel (2005). Michael Jackson, the King of Pop: The Big Picture: the Music! the Man! the Legend! the Interviews!. Amber Books Publishing. ISBN 0-9749779-0-X.
- Taraborrelli, J. Randy (2004). The Magic and the Madness. Terra Alta, WV: Headline. ISBN 0-330-42005-4.
