= Blood on the Dance Floor =

Blood on the Dance Floor may refer to:

- Blood on the Dance Floor: HIStory in the Mix, a 1997 album by Michael Jackson
  - "Blood on the Dance Floor" (song), a 1997 song by Michael Jackson from the album
- Blood on the Dance Floor (band), a dance-pop musical group established in 2007
