= Ghosts (Michael Jackson song) =

1997 single by Michael Jackson

Single by Michael Jackson

from the album Blood on the Dance Floor: HIStory in the Mix
- A-side: "HIStory"
- Released: July 30, 1997
- Recorded: 1993–1996; 1997
- Genre: New jack swing; R&B
- Length: 3:50 (radio edit); 5:13 (album version)
- Label: Epic
- Songwriters: Michael Jackson; Teddy Riley
- Producers: Michael Jackson; Teddy Riley

Michael Jackson singles chronology
| "Blood on the Dance Floor" (1997) | "HIStory" / "Ghosts" (1997) | "You Rock My World" (2001) |

Music video
- "Ghosts" on YouTube

"Ghosts" is a 1997 song by American singer Michael Jackson, written, composed and produced by Jackson and Teddy Riley. It was released as part of "HIStory" / "Ghosts", a double A-side single with remixes of the song "HIStory" from Jackson's 1995 album as the second single from Blood on the Dance Floor: HIStory in the Mix. The music video for the song was a five-minute clip taken from a longer film, Michael Jackson's Ghosts. The song was a top-five hit in the UK and Belgium.

== Production, music and commentary ==
"Ghosts" was one of the five new tracks on the album. It was written, composed, and produced by Michael Jackson and Teddy Riley. The song was originally developed during sessions for Jackson's 1995 album, HIStory: Past, Present and Future, Book I. It did not make the final cut, but it would be featured in the short film of the same name. After HIStory, additional work on the song took place in late August 1995 at the Hit Factory with René Moore and engineers Bruce Swedien and Rob Hoffman when doing remixes of Jackson's songs. Whilst developing music for the Ghosts short film, the song was revisited and further developed in March/April 1996 at Record One and later in the same Summer at the Record Plant studio before the movie's release.

Instruments played on the track include a guitar and piano. Michael's vocals are dramatic and operatic. Jackson's vocal range on the song is E_{3}-A_{5}, the song is in the key of E dorian and at 103 BPM. The Washington Post noted, "'Ghosts' is another new jack swing collaboration with Teddy Riley for a similarly short film. It is a bit unsettling, particularly when Jackson spits out this line: 'Who gave you the right to shake my family tree?'." Tom Sinclair of Entertainment Weekly, also highlighted those particular lyrics, speculating that "armchair psychologists will have a field day with the words".

The Dallas Morning News described "Ghosts" as an angry tale of a back-stabbing woman. Michael Saunders of The Boston Globe said that album cuts like "Is It Scary" and "Ghosts" "trample well-trodden ground". Sonia Murray of The Atlanta Journal and The Atlanta Constitution said of the track, "'Ghosts' pounds with funk until Jackson's weak vocals come in. Anthony Violanti of The Buffalo News said "'Ghosts'...[is] programmed plastic soul that makes you wonder how someone as talented as Jackson can churn out such tracks". Jim Farber of New York Daily News said that "Ghosts" and "Is It Scary" "boast a few innovative sounds but no real melodies". Roger Catlin of The Hartford Courant stated, "The most intriguing pairing is 'Ghosts' and 'Is It Scary' in which he asks those who've only read about him in tabloids if he seems monstrous."

Jennifer Clay of Yahoo! Music noted that "Ghosts" sounded like material from the Thriller era. A longtime commentator on Jackson's public life, J. Randy Taraborrelli, gave a retrospective analysis of the album in the biography, The Magic & the Madness. Taraborrelli explained, "Several of the other songs on Blood are also memorable. 'Ghosts' stands out, perhaps because it's so evocative of Michael's spell-binding Ghosts long-styled video...it's classic, must-see Michael Jackson."

== Short film ==
The music video for "Ghosts" was a five-minute cut-down of the short film of the same name, which Jackson unveiled at the Cannes Film Festival as part of the album promotion. It was released theatrically in the US in October 1996 and made its UK debut the following May at the Odeon Leicester Square in London. It was released on video cassette in most parts of the world. The music video won the Bob Fosse Award for Best Choreography in a Music Video.

Written by Jackson and Stephen King and directed by Stan Winston, the short film was inspired by the isolation the singer felt after he was accused of child sexual abuse in 1993. It centers on the Maestro (Jackson), who is nearly chased out of his town by the residents and the mayor (also played by Michael Jackson, who deliberately resembles Tom Sneddon, a prosecutor in the 1993 and 2005 accusations) because they believe him to be a "freak". The film includes several songs and music videos from the albums HIStory and Blood on the Dance Floor: HIStory in the Mix. At over 38 minutes long, it held the Guinness World Records for the longest music video until 2013, when it was eclipsed by Pharrell Williams' "Happy". The short version is included in Michael Jackson's Vision.

== Chart performance ==
"HIStory" / "Ghosts" generally did well in music charts worldwide, having charted within the top-ten and top-twenty in multiple countries. The song's highest peak position was in Italy, charting at number three. In the Netherlands, Belgium and Sweden "HIStory" / "Ghosts" spent seventeen to eighteen weeks on the charts. In Australia "HIStory" / "Ghosts" peaked at forty-three before falling off the chart. The single did not appear on any United States Billboard charts.

== Track listing ==
CD single

1. "HIStory" (7" HIStory Lesson Edit) – 4:08
2. "HIStory" (Mark!'s Radio Edit) – 4:16
3. "HIStory" (Mark!'s Vocal Club Mix) – 9:11
4. "HIStory" (The Ummah Radio Mix) – 5:00
5. "HIStory" (The Ummah DJ Mix) – 3:04
6. "HIStory" (The Ummah Main A Cappella) – 4:06
7. "Ghosts" (Radio Edit) – 3:50

12" single

1. "Ghosts" (Mousse T's Club Mix) – 6:03
2. "Ghosts" (Mousse T's Radio Rock) – 4:25
3. "HIStory" (Tony Moran's HIStorical Dub) – 7:56
4. "HIStory" (7" HIStory Lesson Edit) – 4:09

== Remixes ==
Mousse T mixes

- "Ghosts" (Mousse T's Club Mix) – 6:03
- "Ghosts" (Mousse T's Club Mix TV) – 6:03
- "Ghosts" (Mousse T's Radio Rock) – 4:25

== Personnel ==
- Written, composed and produced by Michael Jackson with Teddy Riley
- Opera voice by Michael Jackson
- Harmonizing by Michael Jackson
- Front and background vocals by Michael Jackson
- Engineered by Teddy Riley and Eddie DeLena
- Mixed by Dave Way
- Solo and background vocals, vocal arrangement and piano by Michael Jackson
- Teddy Riley, Brad Buxer and Doug Grigsby: Keyboards and synthesizers
- Matt Carpenter, Doug Grigsby, Andrew Scheps, Rob Hoffman and Alex Breuer: Drum programming
- Additional engineering by Bobby Brooks, Matt Forger, Andrew Scheps, Armand Volker and Albert Boekholt
- Assistant engineers: Tony Black, Mike Scotell, Greg Collins, Gerd Krenz, Patrick Ulenberg, Paul Dicato, Andy Strange, Rob Hoffman and Tom Bender

== Charts ==
=== Weekly charts ===
Weekly chart performance for "HIStory" / "Ghosts"
| Chart (1997) | Peak position |
|---|---|
| Australia (ARIA) | 43 |
| Austria (Ö3 Austria Top 40) | 36 |
| Belgium (Ultratop 50 Flanders) | 17 |
| Belgium (Ultratop 50 Wallonia) | 10 |
| Estonia (Eesti Top 20) | 9 |
| Finland (Suomen virallinen lista) | 16 |
| France (SNEP) | 26 |
| Germany (GfK) | 14 |
| Ireland (IRMA) | 16 |
| Netherlands (Dutch Top 40) | 16 |
| Netherlands (Single Top 100) | 14 |
| New Zealand (Recorded Music NZ) | 29 |
| Sweden (Sverigetopplistan) | 12 |
| Switzerland (Schweizer Hitparade) | 16 |
| UK Singles (Official Charts) | 5 |

=== Year-end charts ===
Year-end chart performance for "HIStory" / "Ghosts"
| Chart (1997) | Position |
|---|---|
| Belgium (Ultratop 50 Flanders) | 69 |
| Belgium (Ultratop 50 Wallonia) | 48 |
| Germany (Media Control) | 58 |
| Netherlands (Dutch Top 40) | 95 |
| Netherlands (Single Top 100) | 75 |
| Sweden (Topplistan) | 86 |

== See also ==
- Michael Jackson's Ghosts

== Bibliography ==
- George, Nelson (2004). Michael Jackson: The Ultimate Collection booklet. Sony BMG.
- Lewis, Jel (2005). Michael Jackson, the King of Pop: The Big Picture : the Music! the Man! the Legend! the Interviews!. Amber Books Publishing. ISBN 0-9749779-0-X.
- Taraborrelli, J. Randy (2004). The Magic and the Madness. Terra Alta, WV: Headline. ISBN 0-330-42005-4.
