= Dangerous (Michael Jackson song) =

Song by Michael Jackson

from the album Dangerous
- Released: November 21, 1991 (album release)
- Recorded: 1988; September 1990 – October 1991
- Genre: New jack swing; industrial; funk
- Length: 6:57: 4:15 (radio edit)
- Label: Epic
- Songwriters: Michael Jackson; Bill Bottrell; Teddy Riley
- Producers: Michael Jackson; Teddy Riley

Licensed audio
- "Dangerous" on YouTube

"Dangerous" is a song by American singer and recording artist Michael Jackson. The song appeared as the fourteenth and final track on Jackson's album of the same name, released in November 1991. Written and composed by Jackson, Bill Bottrell and Teddy Riley, the song was planned to be released as the tenth and final single from the album. However, these plans were cancelled due to allegations of child sexual abuse which were made against Jackson in August 1993 and Jackson's health concerns. "Dangerous" is a new jack swing song which also incorporates industrial music and funk.

Prior to the planned release of the song, "Dangerous" received a positive reaction from contemporary critics in reviews of the track's parent album. Although it has not been released as a single, "Dangerous" entered music charts in mid-2009 after Jackson's death in June.

In 1994, songwriter Crystal Cartier alleged that Jackson, Bottrell and Riley had plagiarized "Dangerous". At the subsequent court hearing the judge ruled in favor of Jackson, Bottrell, and Riley, due to lack of evidence; Cartier was refused the right to appeal her case.

Near the end of Dangerous: The Short Films, the song is played over footage of various performances during his Dangerous World Tour. The live performances of "Dangerous" remained a staple of Jackson's concerts since the third leg of the tour. "Dangerous" was a song that involved group choreography, similar to "Smooth Criminal", which also appears as part of the mix in later performances.

== Background ==
"Dangerous" was developed from another song titled "Streetwalker", which Jackson wrote for his 1987 Bad album. In 1988, Bill Bottrell created the music track for what would eventually become the demo of "Dangerous", using "Streetwalker" as a starting point. During recording sessions in September 1990 for Dangerous, Jackson recorded a 6:40 minute demo of "Dangerous", which he wrote using Bottrell's music track. Teddy Riley later added writing and produced it with Jackson in 1991. According to music commentator Nelson George the demo is "very different to the final version. Here the keyboards are spacey, in strong contrast to the taunt, mechanical rhythm track. Throughout the song, Jackson keeps up a spoken word rap about the dangerous woman who is this song's subject. Overall it is much moodier". The demo was released in November 2004, on The Ultimate Collection. A different, longer version also exists, with Jackson heard screaming at the beginning—after a sound protection wall fell on him as he was about to record. "The genesis of the songs we co-wrote [for Dangerous]", said Bottrell, "consisted of Jackson humming melodies and grooves, and him then leaving the studio while I developed these ideas with a bunch of drum machines and samplers". "Dangerous" is played in the key of D minor with Jackson's vocal range being from A_{2} to B_{5}. The song's tempo is moderate at 113 beats per minute.

=== Planned single release ===
The album Dangerous was released in November 1991, and with shipments of seven million copies in the United States and 32 million copies sold worldwide, it stands as one of the world's best-selling records. The album's appeal and commercial success prompted Jackson's record company to keep releasing singles throughout 1992 and 1993, especially as Jackson was still promoting the album with a worldwide concert tour. However, August 1993 saw intensifying media scrutiny surrounding allegations of child sexual abuse on Jackson's part. The album's ninth single, "Gone Too Soon", did not perform well in the United Kingdom and Jackson's health deteriorated, which eventually led to the cancellation of the album's tenth single, "Dangerous", but the song was released with "Remember the Time" and "Black or White" on the box set Tour Souvenir Pack. An alternative version and a remix, entitled "Roger's Rough Dub", were both to be included on a bonus disc of the expanded edition of Dangerous. The bonus disc was later shelved.

=== Court case ===
In 1994, songwriter Crystal Cartier accused Jackson, Bottrell and Riley of plagiarizing the song. Cartier claimed she had written, copyrighted and recorded the song in 1985. At a court hearing, Jackson testified that "Dangerous" grew out of a song called "Streetwalker", which he co-wrote with Bottrell in 1985. His original demo version of the song was played in court. The recordings were followed by a cappella performances of "Dangerous" and "Billie Jean", giving a rare insight into his songwriting habits. As Cartier was unable to supply any original tapes to back up her suit, the judge found in Jackson's favor, and Cartier was refused the right to appeal.

== Live performances ==
Although the song was not released as a single, the live performances of "Dangerous" remained a staple of Jackson's concerts since the second leg of the Dangerous World Tour. "Dangerous" was a song that involved group choreography, similar to "Smooth Criminal", which also appears as part of the mix in later performances. There were five live performance versions of "Dangerous", although Jackson nearly always lipsynced this song:

- The first was unveiled at the 1993 American Music Awards and performed on the final leg of the Dangerous World Tour. This version included Jackson singing the second verse, chorus, bridge, and third speaking interlude.
- The second was performed from 1995 to 1997, starting from the 1995 Soul Train Music Awards, and during most of the concerts for the HIStory World Tour. It did not contain the second verse, bridge or third speaking interlude. This version samples an extract from "Owner of a Lonely Heart" by Yes, Ennio Morricone's The Good, the Bad and the Ugly theme, "Smooth Criminal", Janet Jackson's "You Want This" and "Let's Dance", Judy Garland's "Get Happy", Monty Norman's "James Bond Theme", and a guitar intro from Duran Duran's "A View to a Kill". The HIStory World Tour version contains slightly more sound effects during the breakdown; Jackson spoke the rap in the beginning live during the concert in Ostend, Belgium on September 3, 1997. Dangerous was not performed on two concerts, the final concert in Tokyo and the concert in Manila.
- The third was performed twice: during both 1999 MJ & Friends concerts. It is similar to the 1995 mix, but has clicking sound effects instead of the main drumbeat during the spoken part, and a short interlude with the dancers introducing themselves.
- The fourth was performed at the Apollo Theater in 2002 and at the 50th American Bandstand Special in 2002 and is a variation of both the second and third version. There are clicking beats as with the 1999 mix, but only replacing the finger snaps in the beginning and the main beat begins as it does in the 1995 mix. Additionally during the performance at the 50th American Bandstand Special, Jackson briefly sang a section live towards the end and even threw his hat off along with the jacket. Jackson's performance at the Apollo Theater marks his last live performance ever.
- The fifth was being rehearsed for the This Is It concerts in Staples Center and the Forum in L.A, but were cancelled because of his sudden death. Audio of this version leaked online in 2010. It is similar to the 1999 mix, but in the beginning makes a combination between the clicking beats of 1999 mix and the finger snaps of 1995 mix. It features snippets of "Morphine", "2000 Watts", "Heartbreak Hotel", "Stranger in Moscow", and the Psycho theme. In January 2011, at the "Carnival Dance Showcase", the This Is It concerts dancers performed a snippet of "Dangerous" as it would have been in the concerts, but without the leaked intro.

For the MJ & Friends concerts and on, Jackson wore a red shirt instead of the original white shirt and tie, but the tie was kept in. For all of the performances Jackson wore a black suit jacket with a white armband.

== Critical analysis ==
"Dangerous" was generally well received by contemporary music critics. Jon Pareles, a writer for The New York Times, called it "[Jackson's] latest song about a predatory lover" and highlighted the lyrics "I felt taken by lust's strange inhumanity," observing, "He is a great dancer, yet his songs proclaim a terror of the body and of fleshly pleasures." Music critic Nelson George said of the song, "[it is] a pile driving track...that explodes from radio speakers. 'Dangerous' in fact, opens another window into Michael's artistic process." Writer Barry Farber noted that the same lyrics "are an excellent representation of how sex can sometimes feel like a powerful biologically driven force."

== Chart performance ==
Although it has not been released as a single, "Dangerous" entered music charts in mid-2009 after Jackson's death in June. The track debuted at its peak position, number seventy eight, on the Swiss Singles Chart for the week of July 12, 2009. The song also peaked at number ninety nine on the German Singles Chart for the week of July 13, 2009. "Dangerous" only remained on the two countries chart for one week.

== Remixes ==
Roger Sanchez, who previously remixed "Jam" and "Don't Stop 'Til You Get Enough", was commissioned to create several remixes of the song in time for its release as a single, but after the single was cancelled, all of the remixes were shelved. Eventually, a few of the remixes saw the light of day on releases of the 1997 single "Blood on the Dance Floor", the first single from Jackson's remix album Blood on the Dance Floor: HIStory in the Mix. One of the remixes, "Roger's Rough Dub", was to be included on a bonus disc of the expanded edition of Dangerous, which was eventually shelved. The majority of Sanchez' original remixes remain unreleased, and are only available on a rare digital audio tape distributed among label executives.

"Blood on the Dance Floor" single mixes

- "Dangerous" (Roger's Dangerous Club Mix) – 6:58
- "Dangerous" (Roger's Dangerous Edit) – 4:40
- "Dangerous" (Roger's Rough Dub) – 6:48

Unreleased mixes

- "Dangerous" (Roger's Funky Jeep Mix) – 6:55
- "Dangerous" (Roger's Funky Jeep Radio) – 4:40
- "Dangerous" (Roger's Jeep Instrumental) – 6:15
- "Dangerous" (Roger's Tribal Treatment) – 4:53
- "Dangerous" (Subterranian Dub 1) – 7:05
- "Dangerous" (Subterranian Dub 2) – 5:40
- "Dangerous" (Bad Boy Beats) – 3:27

== Personnel ==
- Written and composed by Michael Jackson, Bill Bottrell and Teddy Riley
- Produced by Teddy Riley and Michael Jackson
- Recorded by Jean-Marie Horvat, Bruce Swedien, Teddy Riley and Thom Russo
- Mixed by Bruce Swedien and Teddy Riley
- Michael Jackson: solo and background vocals
- Vocal arrangement by Michael Jackson
- Rhythm and synthesizer arrangements by Teddy Riley
- Teddy Riley: synthesizer
- Brad Buxer, Rhett Lawrence: synthesizers

== Charts ==
Chart performance for "Dangerous"
Chart (2009)	Peak position
Germany (GfK)	99
Switzerland (Schweizer Hitparade)	78

== Bibliography ==
- Amador, Vicente B (1998). Copyright under the Intellectual Property Code. Rex Bookstore, Inc. ISBN 971-23-2591-1.
- Campbell, Lisa (1993). Michael Jackson: The King of Pop. Branden. ISBN 0-8283-1957-X.
- Campbell, Lisa (1995). Michael Jackson: The King of Pop's Darkest Hour. Branden. ISBN 0-8283-2003-9.
- Farber, Barry (2007). Rock 'n' Roll Wisdom. Greenwood Publishing Group. ISBN 978-0-275-99164-7.
- Halstead, Craig (2007). Michael Jackson: For the Record. Authors OnLine. pp. 46-48. ISBN 978-0-7552-0267-6.
- George, Nelson (2004). Michael Jackson: The Ultimate Collection booklet. Sony BMG.
