= LaVelle Smith Jr. =

American choreographer

LaVelle Smith Jr is an American choreographer and dancer. Known for his work in the music videos of singers such as En Vogue, Michael Jackson, Janet Jackson and Beyoncé Knowles, Smith has won the MTV Video Music Award for Best Choreography five times.

== Biography ==
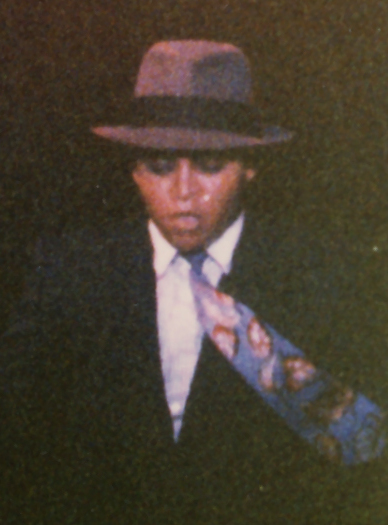
Smith in 1992.

Smith had originally wanted to pursue a career in drama, auditioning at the Youth Performing Arts School in Louisville, Kentucky. Upon failing the audition, Smith was given the option to study dance. Graduating from YPAS in 1983, Smith moved to Chicago and was employed by Gus Giordano in the dance troupe Giordano Jazz Dance Chicago. Unhappy with the level of pay, Smith auditioned for numerous dancing roles, while facing racial prejudice. "When that happens, you realize that you have to be even better or move to L.A. where it doesn't matter," he said later.

Noticed by singer Michael Jackson, Smith landed a job as a dancer before becoming his choreographer. Smith worked on three of Jackson's world tours; Bad, Dangerous and HIStory. He also worked as a choreographer in Michael Jackson's Ghosts, and for the musical Thriller - Live.

Smith appeared on the concert tours of The Rolling Stones, Diana Ross and Janet Jackson's Rhythm Nation 1814 Tour. Smith also worked for Victoria Beckham after the Spice Girl made a return as a solo artist.

Smith was awarded four MTV Video awards for co-choreographing En Vogue's music videos "My Lovin' (You're Never Gonna Get It)" (1992), "Free Your Mind" (1993), "Whatta Man" (1994) and Michael Jackson's duet with sister Janet, "Scream" (1995). The music video for Beyoncé's "Crazy in Love" won Smith his fifth MTV Video Music Award for Best Choreography in 2003.

His other awards include a SSDC Bob Fosse award and an Emmy award. Smith was also the youngest inductee into the Millers Gallery of Greats.

Smith has choreographed Invincible: A Glorious Tribute To Michael Jackson featuring Jeffrey Perez and Pete Carter.

Smith's work with Michael Jackson is the subject of the 2019 documentary film The Man Behind The Dance.

In 2022, Smith appeared as a featured guest at Kingvention, the annual Michael Jackson fan convention held in London.

== Personal life ==
Moving from Los Angeles, California back to Louisville, Kentucky in 2001, the choreographer wanted to get away from the expensive party lifestyle of the city and open up a Kebab shop called Hot Bitez. Michael Jackson's guitarist, Jennifer Batten also lives in the town.
