= HIStory World Tour =

1996–1997 concert tour by Michael Jackson

- Tour by Michael Jackson
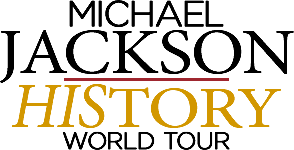
- Promotional image for the tour
- Arrangers: Kenny Ortega; Michael Jackson
- Location: Africa; Asia; Europe; North America; Oceania
- Associated album: HIStory: Past, Present and Future, Book I; Blood on the Dance Floor: HIStory in the Mix
- Start date: September 7, 1996
- End date: October 15, 1997
- Legs: 2
- No. of shows: 82
- Attendance: 4.5 million
- Box office: US$165 million (US$469,250,889.67 million in 2026 dollars)

Michael Jackson concert chronology
- Dangerous World Tour (1992–1993); HIStory World Tour (1996–1997); MJ & Friends (1999)

The HIStory World Tour was the third and final worldwide solo concert tour by American singer and songwriter Michael Jackson, covering Europe, Asia, Oceania, Africa and North America. The tour included a total of 82 concerts spanning the globe with stops in 57 cities, 35 countries on five continents. The tour promoted Jackson's 1995 album HIStory: Past, Present and Future, Book I. The second leg also promoted the remix album Blood on the Dance Floor: HIStory in the Mix. The tour was attended by over 4.5 million fans and grossed over US$165 million making it the highest-grossing tour of the 1990s by a solo artist.

== Overview ==
The tour was announced on May 29, 1996, and marked Jackson's first concert tour since the Dangerous World Tour ended in November 1993.

=== Europe, Africa, Asia and Oceania (1996) ===
Jackson's debut concert for the tour, performed at Letná Park in Prague, was one of the largest single attended concerts in his career, with over 125,000 people. On October 7, he performed for the first time ever in the Arab world and Africa as a solo artist in Tunis. During the tour's stopover in Sydney, he married Debbie Rowe in a private and impromptu ceremony. He was interviewed by Molly Meldrum in Brisbane and danced with two women during "You Are Not Alone".

=== North America (1997) ===
From January 3–4, Jackson performed his only two concerts on this tour in the US, in Honolulu, Hawaii, at the Aloha Stadium, to a crowd of 35,000 each; making him the first artist in history to sell out the stadium.

=== Europe and Africa (1997) ===
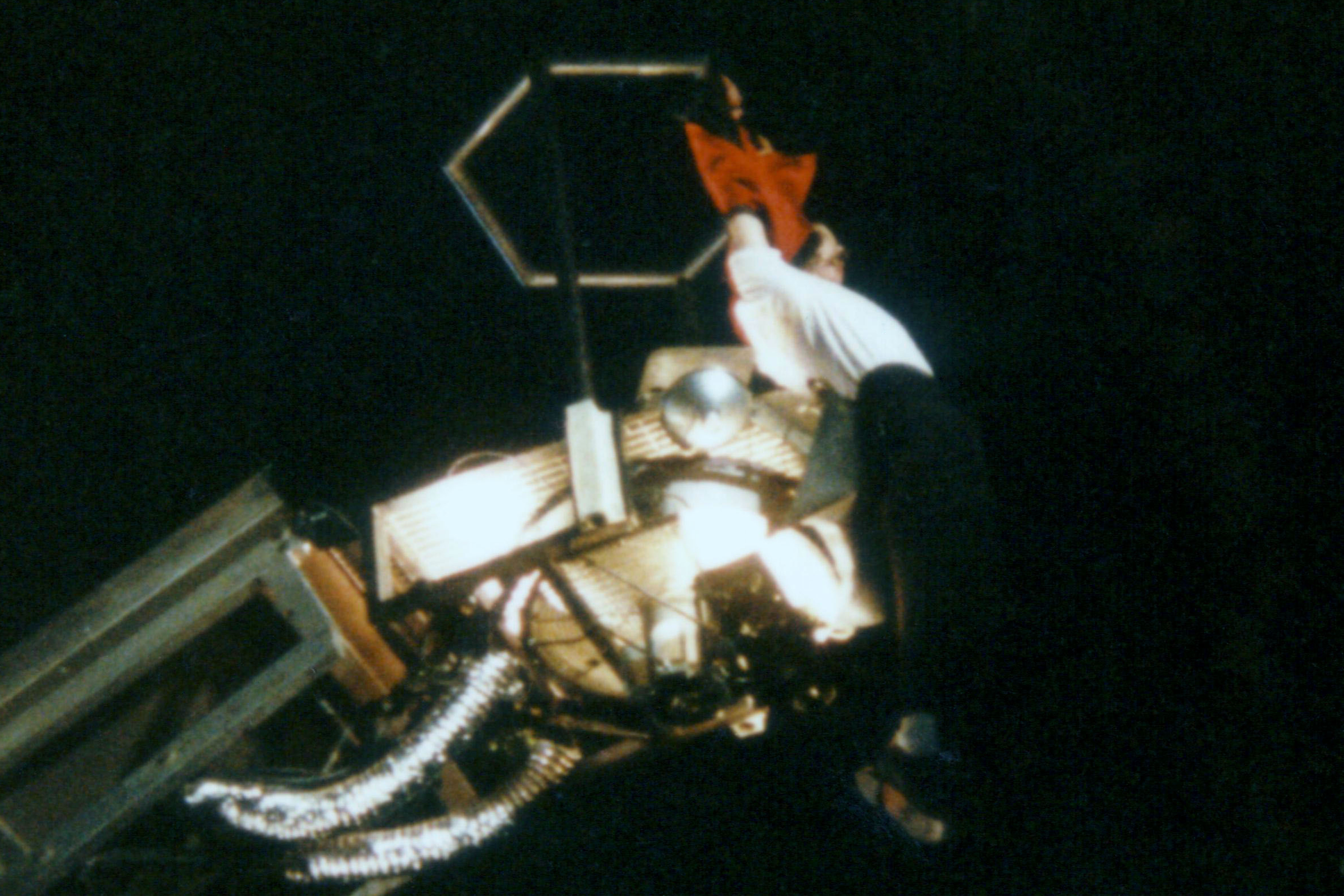
Michael Jackson performing "Earth Song" in Lausanne, June 20, 1997

During the break period, Jackson worked and released his Blood on the Dance Floor: HIStory in the Mix album. The second leg started on May 31, at the Weserstadion in Bremen, Germany.

Jackson performed at the Parken Stadium in Copenhagen, Denmark on his 39th birthday with 60,000 fans. He was presented with a surprise birthday cake, marching band, and fireworks on stage after "You Are Not Alone". The concert at Hippodrome Wellington of Ostend, Belgium, was originally scheduled for August 31, but was postponed to September 3 following the death of Diana, Princess of Wales.

=== Latin America cancellations (1997–98) ===
There were some initial plans to take the tour, in February 1997, to such Brazilian cities as São Paulo, Curitiba, Rio de Janeiro, and Brasília; but these plans were suspended due to promotional issues. Jackson tried to visit Brazil again in February 1998, as well as Argentina, but these too were scrapped so that he could work on MJ & Friends.

== Recordings ==
Throughout the tour, many concerts were professionally filmed by Nocturne Productions, but none were ever officially released worldwide. The Seoul dates was recorded and released as a proshot exclusively in South Korea under the title 마이클 잭슨 내한공연 (Michael Jackson HIStory Tour In Seoul). The two concerts in Munich, Germany, were also recorded and later broadcast by German television channels.

== Set list ==
1996–1997 set list

1. "Great Gates of Kiev" (introduction)
2. "Scream" / "They Don't Care About Us" / "In the Closet" (contains excerpts of "HIStory", "Great Gates of Kiev" and "She Drives Me Wild")
3. "Wanna Be Startin' Somethin'"
4. "Stranger in Moscow"
5. "Smooth Criminal" (contains elements of "Childhood")
6. "The Wind" (video interlude)
7. "You Are Not Alone"
8. "The Way You Make Me Feel" (September 7, 1996 – June 15, 1997)
9. The Jackson 5 Medley: "I Want You Back" / "The Love You Save" / "I'll Be There"
10. Off the Wall Medley: "Rock with You" / "Off the Wall" / "Don't Stop 'Til You Get Enough" (select 1996 and 1997 dates)
11. "Remember the Time" (video interlude)
12. "Billie Jean"
13. "Thriller"
14. "Beat It"
15. "Come Together" / "D.S." (select 1996 dates) / "Blood on the Dance Floor" (select 1997 dates)
16. "Black Panther" (video interlude)
17. "Dangerous" (contains elements from "Owner of a Lonely Heart" by Yes, Ennio Morricone's "The Good, the Bad and the Ugly Theme", "Smooth Criminal", Janet Jackson's "You Want This" and "Interlude: Let's Dance", Judy Garland's "Get Happy", Monty Norman's "James Bond Theme", and a guitar intro from Duran Duran's "A View to a Kill")
18. "Black or White"
19. "Earth Song"
20. "We Are the World" (video interlude)
21. "Heal the World"
22. "HIStory" (with instrumental of "They Don't Care About Us" as a curtain call and contains elements from "Great Gates of Kiev")

Alterations

- Songs originally considered for the first leg of the tour included "Man in the Mirror", "She's Out of My Life", "Jam", "Childhood", "Will You Be There", "Dirty Diana", "State of Shock" and "2 Bad". "Morphine" was also rehearsed twice for the 1997 leg but was also removed.
- The medley of "Come Together" and "D.S." was removed after the Adelaide concert on November 26, 1996. "Blood on the Dance Floor" replaced them for most of the 1997 leg before being removed after August 19. Prior to this, it was omitted from the Vienna concert on July 2.
- "Rock with You", "Off the Wall" and "Don't Stop 'Til You Get Enough" were performed on select dates, before being permanently removed from the set list after June 13, 1997.
- "The Way You Make Me Feel" was performed on select dates until after June 15, 1997.
- Starting on September 3, 1997, the instrumental of "Gates of Kiev" was replaced with "Smile", in memory of Diana, Princess of Wales.
- On August 22, 1997, "Ben" was played at the beginning of the Tallinn concert.

== Tour dates ==
List of 1996 concerts, showing date, city, country, venue, tickets sold and number of available tickets
Date	City	Country	Venue	Attendance
September 7, 1996	Prague	Czech Republic	Letná Park	125,000 / 125,000
September 10, 1996	Budapest	Hungary	Népstadion	50,000 / 50,000
September 14, 1996	Bucharest	Romania	Stadionul Național	70,000 / 70,000
September 17, 1996	Moscow	Russia	Dynamo Stadium	50,000 / 50,000
September 20, 1996	Warsaw	Poland	Lotnisko Bemowo	120,000 / 120,000
September 23, 1996	Zaragoza	Spain	Estadio La Romareda	45,000 / 45,000
September 28, 1996 (Note: Originally scheduled at Stade Mohammed V in Casablanca, Morocco on September 27 and 29, 1996, but the venue was moved due to security issues.)	Amsterdam	Netherlands	Amsterdam Arena	250,000 / 250,000 (Note: Attendance combined with the attendance from September 28, 30 and October 2, 1996, and June 8 and 10, 1997.)
September 30, 1996	Amsterdam	Netherlands	Amsterdam Arena	250,000 / 250,000
October 2, 1996 (Note: Originally scheduled at Cairo International Stadium in Cairo, Egypt, but the venue was moved due to security issues.)	Amsterdam	Netherlands	Amsterdam Arena	250,000 / 250,000
October 7, 1996	Tunis	Tunisia	El Menzah Stadium	60,000 / 60,000
October 11, 1996	Seoul	South Korea	Olympic Stadium	100,000 / 100,000
October 13, 1996	Seoul	South Korea	Olympic Stadium	100,000 / 100,000
October 18, 1996	Taipei	Taiwan	Zhongshan Soccer Stadium	80,000 / 80,000 (Note: Attendance combined with the attendance from October 18 and 22.)
October 20, 1996	Kaohsiung	Taiwan	Chungcheng Stadium	30,000 / 30,000
October 22, 1996 (Note: Originally October 16, but was rescheduled due to logistical issues.)	Taipei	Taiwan	Zhongshan Soccer Stadium	—
October 25, 1996	Singapore		National Stadium	26,000 / 35,000
October 27, 1996	Kuala Lumpur	Malaysia	Stadium Merdeka	80,000 / 80,000
October 29, 1996	Kuala Lumpur	Malaysia	Stadium Merdeka	80,000 / 80,000
November 1, 1996	Mumbai	India	Andheri Sports Complex	70,000 / 70,000
November 5, 1996	Pak Kret (Note: Part of Bangkok Metropolitan Region, labelled as Bangkok in promotional material)	Thailand	Impact Lake Front Concert Grounds	40,000 / 40,000
November 9, 1996	Auckland	New Zealand	Ericsson Stadium	86,000 / 86,000
November 11, 1996	Auckland	New Zealand	Ericsson Stadium	86,000 / 86,000
November 14, 1996	Sydney	Australia	Sydney Cricket Ground	86,000 / 86,000
November 16, 1996	Sydney	Australia	Sydney Cricket Ground	86,000 / 86,000
November 19, 1996	Brisbane	Australia	ANZ Stadium	40,000 / 40,000
November 22, 1996	Melbourne	Australia	Melbourne Cricket Ground	130,000 / 130,000
November 24, 1996	Melbourne	Australia	Melbourne Cricket Ground	130,000 / 130,000
November 26, 1996	Adelaide	Australia	Adelaide Oval	30,000 / 30,000
November 30, 1996	Perth	Australia	Burswood Dome	60,000 / 60,000
December 2, 1996	Perth	Australia	Burswood Dome	60,000 / 60,000
December 4, 1996	Perth	Australia	Burswood Dome	60,000 / 60,000
December 8, 1996	Parañaque (Note: Part of Metro Manila (National Capital Region), labelled as Manila in promotional material)	Philippines	Asia World City Concert Grounds	110,000 / 110,000
December 10, 1996	Parañaque	Philippines	Asia World City Concert Grounds	110,000 / 110,000
December 13, 1996	Tokyo	Japan	Tokyo Dome	180,000 / 180,000
December 15, 1996	Tokyo	Japan	Tokyo Dome	180,000 / 180,000
December 17, 1996	Tokyo	Japan	Tokyo Dome	180,000 / 180,000
December 20, 1996	Tokyo	Japan	Tokyo Dome	180,000 / 180,000
December 26, 1996	Fukuoka	Japan	Fukuoka Dome	80,000 / 80,000
December 28, 1996	Fukuoka	Japan	Fukuoka Dome	80,000 / 80,000
December 31, 1996	Bandar Seri Begawan	Brunei	Jerudong Park Amphitheater	40,000 / 60,000+

List of 1997 concerts, showing date, city, country, venue, tickets sold and number of available tickets
Date	City	Country	Venue	Attendance
January 3, 1997	Honolulu	United States	Aloha Stadium	70,000 / 70,000
January 4, 1997	Honolulu	United States	Aloha Stadium	70,000 / 70,000
May 31, 1997	Bremen	Germany	Weserstadion	85,000 / 85,000 (Note: Attendance and box office combined with the attendance from May 31 and June 6.)
June 3, 1997	Cologne	Germany	Müngersdorfer Stadion	60,000 / 60,000
June 6, 1997	Bremen	Germany	Weserstadion	—
June 8, 1997	Amsterdam	Netherlands	Amsterdam Arena	—
June 10, 1997	Amsterdam	Netherlands	Amsterdam Arena	—
June 13, 1997	Kiel	Germany	Nordmarksportfeld	55,000 / 55,000
June 15, 1997	Gelsenkirchen	Germany	Parkstadion	50,000 / 50,000
June 18, 1997	Milan	Italy	San Siro	65,000 / 65,000
June 20, 1997	Lausanne	Switzerland	Stade olympique de la Pontaise	35,000 / 35,000
June 22, 1997	Bettembourg	Luxembourg	Krakelshaff	45,000 / 45,000
June 25, 1997	Lyon	France	Stade de Gerland	25,000 / 25,000
June 27, 1997	Paris	France	Parc des Princes	95,000 / 100,000
June 29, 1997	Paris	France	Parc des Princes	95,000 / 100,000
July 2, 1997	Vienna	Austria	Ernst-Happel-Stadion	50,000 / 50,000
July 4, 1997	Munich	Germany	Olympiastadion	150,000 / 150,000
July 6, 1997	Munich	Germany	Olympiastadion	150,000 / 150,000
July 9, 1997	Sheffield	England	Don Valley Stadium	43,031 / 48,000
July 12, 1997	London	England	Wembley Stadium	212,601 / 216,000
July 15, 1997	London	England	Wembley Stadium	212,601 / 216,000
July 17, 1997	London	England	Wembley Stadium	212,601 / 216,000
July 19, 1997	Dublin	Ireland	RDS Arena	43,261 / 43,261
July 25, 1997	Basel	Switzerland	St. Jakob Stadium	50,000 / 50,000
July 27, 1997	Nice	France	Stade Charles-Ehrmann	30,003 / 36,260
August 1, 1997	Berlin	Germany	Olympiastadion	78,187 / 78,187
August 3, 1997	Leipzig	Germany	Festwiese	54,483 / 55,000
August 10, 1997	Hockenheim	Germany	Hockenheimring	85,000 / 85,000
August 14, 1997	Copenhagen	Denmark	Parken Stadium	47,402 / 47,402
August 16, 1997	Gothenburg	Sweden	Ullevi	50,000 / 50,000
August 19, 1997	Oslo	Norway	Valle Hovin	37,904 / 40,000
August 22, 1997	Tallinn	Estonia	Tallinn Song Festival Grounds	75,000 / 75,000
August 24, 1997	Helsinki	Finland	Helsinki Olympic Stadium	91,106 / 96,000
August 26, 1997	Helsinki	Finland	Helsinki Olympic Stadium	91,106 / 96,000
August 29, 1997	Copenhagen	Denmark	Parken Stadium	50,161 / 50,161
September 3, 1997 (Note: Originally August 31, 1997, but was rescheduled due to the death of Diana, Princess of Wales.)	Ostend	Belgium	Hippodrome Wellington	55,000 / 60,000
September 6, 1997	Valladolid	Spain	Estadio José Zorrilla	20,000 / 26,000
October 4, 1997	Cape Town	South Africa	Green Point Stadium	70,000 / 70,000
October 6, 1997	Cape Town	South Africa	Green Point Stadium	70,000 / 70,000
October 10, 1997	Johannesburg	South Africa	Johannesburg Stadium	106,495 / 108,000
October 12, 1997	Johannesburg	South Africa	Johannesburg Stadium	106,495 / 108,000
October 15, 1997	Durban	South Africa	Kings Park Stadium	50,000 / 50,000
Total				4,520,158 / 4,600,000 (98%)

== Personnel ==
=== Lead performer ===
- Vocals, dance, choreographer: Michael Jackson

=== Dancers ===
==== 1996 leg ====
- LaVelle Smith
- Cris Judd
- Travis Payne
- Damon Navandi
- Courtney Miller
- Jason Yribar
- Anthony Talauega
- Richmond Talauega
- Shawnette Heard
- Lori Werner

==== 1997 leg ====
- LaVelle Smith
- Cris Judd
- Anthony Talauega
- Richmond Talauega
- Stacy Walker
- Faune Chambers

=== Band members ===
- Musical director: Brad Buxer
- Assistant musical director: Kevin Dorsey
- Keyboards: Isaiah Sanders, Brad Buxer
- Drums: Jonathan Moffett
- Guitars: Jennifer Batten, Greg Howe (1996 leg – replaced Jennifer Batten in Amsterdam (October 2), Tunis and Seoul), David Williams
- Bass: Freddie Washington

=== Vocals ===
- Vocal director: Kevin Dorsey
- Vocals: Kevin Dorsey, Dorian Holley, Marva Hicks (1996–1997 leg), Darryl Phinnessee (1996 leg), Fred White (1997 leg)

=== Credits ===
- Executive director: MJJ Productions
- Artistic director: Michael Jackson
- Assistant director: Peggy Holmes
- Choreographed by: Michael Jackson & LaVelle Smith
- Staged & designed by: Kenny Ortega
- Set designed by: Michael Cotton & John McGraw
- Lighting designer: Peter Morse
- Security 1996: Darrell Featherstone
- Security 1997: Bill Bray
- Costumes designed by: Dennis Tompkins & Michael Bush
- Hair & make-up: Karen Faye and Tommy Sims
- Stylist: Tommy Sims
- Tour producer and personal manager: Tarak Ben Ammar
- Personal management: Gallin Morey Associates
- Music video directors: Steve Barron, Joe Pytka, John Landis, Bruce Gowers, Martin Scorsese, Bob Giraldi, John Singleton and Nick Saxton

=== Sponsor ===
- Kingdom Entertainment

== See also ==
- List of highest-attended concerts
- List of most-attended concert tours
- List of highest-grossing concert tours
