= Cheater (song) =

Promotional single by Michael Jackson

from the album The Ultimate Collection
- B-side: "One More Chance" (R. Kelly remix)
- Released: September 14, 2004 (UK only)
- Recorded: 1986
- Studio: Hayvenhurst (Encino, Los Angeles)
- Length: 5:09: 3:58 (radio edit)
- Label: Epic
- Songwriters: Michael Jackson; Greg Phillinganes
- Producer: Michael Jackson

"Cheater" is a song written by Michael Jackson and Greg Phillinganes and was originally slated to appear on Jackson's seventh studio album, Bad (1987), but it was removed from the track listing for unknown reasons. The song was officially released on November 16, 2004, as part of The Ultimate Collection album.

After being sent to US and UK radio stations, the full commercial release of "Cheater" was cancelled for unspecified reasons. It was eventually released as a promotional single on September 14, 2004.

== Background ==
"Cheater" was written and produced by Michael Jackson, and co-written by Greg Phillinganes. The song was originally intended for Jackson's seventh studio album, Bad (1987). However, it failed to make into the final track listing.

As promotion of the limited edition box set from The Ultimate Collection, Epic Records distributed a sampler of the compilation featuring twelve tracks. Eight songs were previously released, while four – "Beautiful Girl", "Scared of the Moon", "We've Had Enough", and "Cheater" – remained unreleased until the compilation's release. The sampler was titled Highlights from The Ultimate Collection in the United States, and The Ultimate Collection Sampler in Europe.

A music video was also shown on some channels; it features clips from the Live in Bucharest: The Dangerous Tour DVD, which was included in the same album the song appears in.

== Critical reception ==
The song received positive critical reception. Stephen Thomas Erlewine of AllMusic described the song as "good stuff" and "so funky, loose, and alive that it's hard not to wish that Jackson didn't fuss over his albums and just record like this all the time."

== Track listing ==
- Digital download
1. "Cheater" (demo) – 5:08
- European promo CD
1. "Cheater" (radio edit) – 3:58
- UK 12" vinyl
1. "Cheater" (demo) – 5:09
2. "One More Chance" (R. Kelly remix) – 3:50

== Credits and personnel ==
- Michael Jackson – songwriting, production, lead and background vocals
- Greg Phillinganes – songwriting, piano, synthesizers
- Bill Bottrell and Matt Forger – audio engineering
- David Williams – guitar

Credits adapted from The Ultimate Collection liner notes.
