= The Ultimate Collection (Michael Jackson album) =

Box set by Michael Jackson
- Released: November 16, 2004
- Recorded: 1969–2004
- Length: 70:48 (disc 1); 48:18 (disc 2); 71:06 (disc 3); 62:28 (disc 4); 122:05 (DVD)
- Labels: MJJ; Legacy; Epic; Sony BMG
- Producers: Michael Jackson; The Corporation; Hal Davis; Gamble & Huff; Quincy Jones; Tom Bahler; The Jacksons; Greg Phillinganes; Bill Bottrell; Teddy Riley; Bruce Swedien; R. Kelly; David Foster; Babyface; Walter Afanasieff; Robin Thicke; Rodney Jerkins; Andre Harris

Michael Jackson chronology
Number Ones (2003)	The Ultimate Collection (2004)	The Essential Michael Jackson (2005)

Alternative covers
- UK iTunes and Amazon UK cover

Alternative cover
- UK physical set

Singles from The Ultimate Collection
- 1. "Cheater" Released: September 14, 2004 (UK only)

Professional ratings
Review scores
Source	Rating
AllMusic	4/5 stars
Rolling Stone	3/5 stars

The Ultimate Collection is a box set by the American singer Michael Jackson, released on November 16, 2004, by Epic Records. It contains four CDs, one DVD, and a 60-page booklet of photos and text by the American music critic Nelson George summarizing Jackson's career.

The album sold 57,000 copies in 2004. On May 16, 2013, it was certified platinum as a multi-disk package for physical shipments of 200,000 copies in the US. The DVD was the first physical release of Live in Bucharest: The Dangerous Tour, broadcast as an HBO concert special in 1992. It was released separately on July 25, 2005.

== Album information ==
Much of the music is drawn from the height of Jackson's career, particularly from the studio albums released by Epic: Off the Wall, Thriller, Bad, Dangerous, HIStory: Past, Present and Future, Book I, and Invincible, plus the remix album Blood on the Dance Floor: HIStory in the Mix.

The box set includes the first release of the demos of songs such as "P.Y.T. (Pretty Young Thing)", "Shake Your Body (Down to the Ground)", "Cheater" and the original demo of "We Are the World" featuring Jackson as a soloist. The set also contains 8 unreleased songs, including "In the Back", "Beautiful Girl", "The Way You Love Me" and "We've Had Enough".

The song "The Way You Love Me" was remixed for the posthumous album Michael with the title "(I Like) The Way You Love Me", and was released as a single on July 8, 2011.

The previously unreleased content from this box set was later included in an iTunes-only collection similarly titled The Ultimate Fan Extras Collection in 2013.

== Rarities ==
The Ultimate Collection box set also contains songs previously out of print:

- "Enjoy Yourself" is 15 seconds longer than the original album version.
- The full version of "You Can't Win" was originally only available on its 12-inch single.
- "Sunset Driver" was originally recorded in 1982 and left off the Thriller album. This same version was later included on Thriller 40 (2022).
- "Someone in the Dark" was recorded in 1982 and first released as a two-part song on the E.T. the Extra-Terrestrial double LP audiobook, and later included in a shorter version in the 2001 Special Edition of Thriller.
- "Scared of the Moon" was recorded in 1983 during the pre-Bad sessions.
- "We Are Here to Change the World" is a previously unreleased song recorded in 1985 and used in the Disney Theme Parks short film Captain EO.
- "Cheater" was recorded in 1986 during the Bad sessions.
- The early version of "Dangerous" and "Monkey Business" were recorded in 1989–1990 during the Dangerous sessions.
- "Someone Put Your Hand Out" was originally recorded in 1987 and re-recorded in 1991. The song was released as a Pepsi-supported cassette single in Europe to promote the Dangerous World Tour (see below).
- "On the Line" was recorded in 1996 and featured on the Get on the Bus movie released the same year. It was also part of the Ghosts box set released in 1997, but containing an earlier fade out.
- "You Are Not Alone" is 15 seconds longer than the album version, featuring more vocals.
- Jackson recorded a demo of "We Are the World" in 1984 with his vocals only.
- "Fall Again" was recorded in 1999 during the early Invincible sessions.
- "In the Back" was recorded between 1994 and 2004 during the HIStory and Invincible sessions.
- "Beautiful Girl" was recorded in 1998 and 2004 during the Invincible sessions.
- "(I Like) The Way You Love Me" was recorded between 1998 and 1999 during the Invincible sessions. A reworked version was released on the posthumous Michael album in 2010.
- "We've Had Enough" was recorded between 1999 and 2000 during the Invincible sessions.

== "Someone Put Your Hand Out" ==
"Someone Put Your Hand Out" (on disc three of The Ultimate Collection) is a song written by Jackson in 1987 for the Bad album and re-written in April 1990 with Teddy Riley, having failed to make it on to Jackson's 1991 album Dangerous. It was released May 1992 in Europe as an exclusive Pepsi promotional single, to promote Jackson's upcoming Dangerous World Tour. 500,000 copies were made available by collecting a winning token from certain Pepsi products.

A cassette single of "Someone Put Your Hand Out" was also released as part of an exclusive Pepsi promotional pack in June 1992 throughout Europe. The promotional pack also included a Michael Jackson poster, a promotional sticker, and a press release about Jackson's upcoming Dangerous World Tour.

An instrumental version of the song was played by Jackson's band during some of the concerts of the Dangerous World Tour.

== Track listing ==
All tracks are written by Michael Jackson, except where noted.

Disc 1
No.	Title	Writer(s)	Original release	Length
1.	"I Want You Back" (The Jackson 5)	The Corporation (Berry Gordy, Freddie Perren, Deke Richards, Alphonzo Mizell)	Diana Ross Presents The Jackson 5	2:58
2.	"ABC" (The Jackson 5)	The Corporation	ABC	2:57
3.	"I'll Be There" (The Jackson 5)	Gordy; Bob West; Willie Hutch; Hal Davis	Third Album	3:56
4.	"Got to Be There"	Elliot Willensky	Got to Be There	3:23
5.	"I Wanna Be Where You Are"	Arthur "T-Boy" Ross; Leon Ware	Got to Be There	2:59
6.	"Ben"	Walter Scharf; Don Black	Ben	2:44
7.	"Dancing Machine" (The Jackson 5) (single version)	Davis; Don Fletcher; Dean Parks	G.I.T.: Get It Together and Dancing Machine	2:37
8.	"Enjoy Yourself" (The Jacksons) (alternate version) (recorded 1976, during sessions for The Jacksons)	Kenny Gamble; Leon Huff	The Jacksons	3:40
9.	"Ease On down the Road" (featuring Diana Ross) (from The Wiz, also unreleased from Off the Wall; recorded August 1977 and 1978)	Charlie Smalls	The Wiz	3:19
10.	"You Can't Win" (alternate version) (recorded for single release by Epic Records, original version from The Wiz film; recorded August 1977 and 1978)	Smalls	The Wiz	7:18
11.	"Shake a Body" (The Jacksons) (early demo) (previously unreleased; recorded August 1978, during Destiny sessions)	M. Jackson; Randy Jackson		2:09
12.	"Shake Your Body (Down to the Ground)" (The Jacksons) (single edit)	M. Jackson; R. Jackson	Destiny	3:44
13.	"Don't Stop 'Til You Get Enough"		Off the Wall	6:04
14.	"Rock with You" (album version #2)	Rod Temperton	Off the Wall	3:39
15.	"Off the Wall"	Temperton	Off the Wall	4:06
16.	"She's Out of My Life"	Tom Bahler	Off the Wall	3:38
17.	"Sunset Driver" (1982 demo) (previously unreleased; recorded 1979 and 1982)			4:03
18.	"Lovely One" (The Jacksons)	M. Jackson; R. Jackson	Triumph	4:50
19.	"This Place Hotel (a.k.a. Heartbreak Hotel)" (The Jacksons)		Triumph	5:44

Disc 2
No.	Title	Writer(s)	Original release	Length
1.	"Wanna Be Startin' Somethin'"		Thriller	6:03
2.	"The Girl Is Mine" (featuring Paul McCartney)		Thriller	3:42
3.	"Thriller"	Temperton	Thriller	5:58
4.	"Beat It"		Thriller	4:18
5.	"Billie Jean"		Thriller	4:53
6.	"P.Y.T. (Pretty Young Thing)" (demo) (previously unreleased; recorded April and October – November 8, 1982)	M. Jackson; Greg Phillinganes		3:46
7.	"Someone in the Dark" (opening version)	Alan Bergman; Marilyn Bergman; Temperton	E.T. the Extra-Terrestrial audiobook	4:54
8.	"State of Shock" (The Jacksons featuring Mick Jagger)	M. Jackson; Randy Hansen	Victory	4:30
9.	"Scared of the Moon" (The Jacksons) (demo) (previously unreleased; recorded 1984, during Victory sessions)	M. Jackson; Buz Kohan		4:41
10.	"We Are the World" (demo) (previously unreleased; recorded January 28, 1985)	M. Jackson; Lionel Richie		5:20
11.	"We Are Here to Change the World" (from Captain EO short film) (previously unreleased)	M. Jackson; John Barnes		2:53

Disc 3
No.	Title	Writer(s)	Original release	Length
1.	"Bad"		Bad	4:07
2.	"The Way You Make Me Feel" (album version #2)		Bad	4:58
3.	"Man in the Mirror"	Siedah Garrett; Glen Ballard	Bad	5:20
4.	"I Just Can't Stop Loving You" (radio edit) (featuring Siedah Garrett)		Bad	4:13
5.	"Dirty Diana" (album version #2)		Bad	4:41
6.	"Smooth Criminal" (album version #3)		Bad	4:17
7.	"Cheater" (demo) (previously unreleased; recorded March 1987, during Bad sessions)	Jackson; Phillinganes		5:09
8.	"Dangerous" (early version) (previously unreleased; recorded 1990–1991)	M. Jackson; Bill Bottrell; Teddy Riley		6:40
9.	"Monkey Business" (previously unreleased; recorded 1989, during Dangerous sessions)	M. Jackson; Bottrell		5:46
10.	"Jam" (featuring Heavy D)	M. Jackson; René Moore; Bruce Swedien; Riley	Dangerous	5:39
11.	"Remember the Time"	M. Jackson; Riley; Bernard Belle	Dangerous	4:00
12.	"Black or White"	M. Jackson; Bottrell	Dangerous	4:16
13.	"Who Is It" (IHS mix)	Michael Jackson	Who Is It (Single)	7:57
14.	"Someone Put Your Hand Out" (recorded 1987, 1990 and 1991)	M. Jackson; Riley	Pepsi promotional cassette single	5:25

Disc 4
No.	Title	Writer(s)	Original release	Length
1.	"You Are Not Alone" (extended version) (recorded September and November 6 and 8, 1994 – March 1995, during HIStory sessions)	R. Kelly	HIStory: Past, Present and Future, Book I	6:03
2.	"Stranger in Moscow"		HIStory: Past, Present and Future, Book I	5:44
3.	"Childhood" (theme from Free Willy 2)		HIStory: Past, Present and Future, Book I	4:28
4.	"On the Line" (recorded 1995 and January–July 1996, during HIStory and Get on the Bus sessions)	M. Jackson; Kenneth "Babyface" Edmonds		4:53
5.	"Blood on the Dance Floor"	M. Jackson; Riley	Blood on the Dance Floor: HIStory in the Mix	4:12
6.	"Fall Again" (demo) (previously unreleased; recorded 1999, during Invincible sessions)	M. Jackson; Walter Afanasieff; Robin Thicke		4:22
7.	"In the Back" (previously unreleased; recorded 1994–2004)	M. Jackson; Ballard		4:31
8.	"Unbreakable" (featuring The Notorious B.I.G.)	M. Jackson; Rodney Jerkins; Fred Jerkins III; LaShawn Daniels; Nora Payne; Robert Smith	Invincible	6:26
9.	"You Rock My World" (album edit)	M. Jackson; R. Jerkins; F. Jerkins; Daniels; Payne	Invincible	5:09
10.	"Butterflies"	Andre Harris; Marsha Ambrosius	Invincible	4:40
11.	"Beautiful Girl" (demo) (previously unreleased; recorded 1998 and 2004)			4:03
12.	"The Way You Love Me" (previously unreleased; recorded 1998–2004)			4:30
13.	"We've Had Enough" (previously unreleased; recorded 1999–2000, during Invincible sessions)	M. Jackson; R. Jerkins; Daniels; Carole Bayer Sager		5:45

DVD: Live in Bucharest: The Dangerous Tour (previously unreleased)
No.	Title	Writer(s)	Length
1.	"Jam"	M. Jackson; Moore; Swedien; Riley	8:16
2.	"Wanna Be Startin' Somethin'"		5:13
3.	"Human Nature"	Steve Porcaro; John Bettis	5:02
4.	"Smooth Criminal"		6:00
5.	"I Just Can't Stop Loving You" (duet with Siedah Garrett)		4:45
6.	"She's Out of My Life"	Bahler	4:53
7.	"I Want You Back/The Love You Save"	The Corporation	2:17
8.	"I'll Be There"	Gordy; West; Hutch; Davis	4:33
9.	"Thriller"	Temperton	5:51
10.	"Billie Jean"		7:44
11.	"Workin' Day and Night"		10:04
12.	"Beat It"		7:24
13.	"Will You Be There"		6:51
14.	"Black or White"	M. Jackson; Bottrell	6:38
15.	"Heal the World"		8:53
16.	"Man in the Mirror"	Garrett; Ballard	13:28

=== Limited Japanese Edition bonus tracks ===
Disc 1
No.	Title	Writer(s)	Album	Length
11.	"Blame It on the Boogie" (The Jacksons)	Michael G. Jackson-Clark; David Jackson-Rich; Hans Kampschroer; Elmar Krohn; Thomas Meyer	Destiny	3:34

Disc 2
No.	Title	Writer(s)	Album	Length
6.	"Human Nature"	Porcaro; Bettis	Thriller	4:05

Disc 3
No.	Title	Album	Length
3.	"Another Part of Me"	Bad	3:55
13.	"Heal the World"	Dangerous	6:25

Disc 4
No.	Title	Writer(s)	Album	Length
12.	"One More Chance"	R. Kelly	Number Ones	3:49

- The addition of "Another Part of Me" pushes the order of tracks down by one (i.e. "Someone Put Your Hand Out" starts off disc 4).

=== Sampler CD ===
Sampler CD
No.	Title	Writer(s)	Length
1.	"I Want You Back" (The Jackson 5)	The Corporation	2:58
2.	"Rock with You"	Temperton	3:39
3.	"She's Out of My Life"	Bahler	3:38
4.	"Wanna Be Startin' Somethin'"		6:03
5.	"Billie Jean"		4:53
6.	"Scared of the Moon" (demo) (previously unreleased)	M. Jackson; Kohan	4:41
7.	"Bad"		4:07
8.	"Man in the Mirror"	Garrett; Ballard	5:20
9.	"Cheater" (demo) (previously unreleased)	M. Jackson; Phillinganes	5:09
10.	"You Are Not Alone" (extended version)	R. Kelly	6:03
11.	"Beautiful Girl" (demo) (previously unreleased)		4:03
12.	"We've Had Enough" (previously unreleased)	M. Jackson; R. Jerkins; Daniels; Sager	5:45

== Charts ==
Chart (2004)	Peak position
Belgian Albums (Ultratop Flanders)	60
Belgian Albums (Ultratop Wallonia)	25
Danish Albums (Hitlisten)	33
Dutch Albums (Album Top 100)	46
German Albums (Offizielle Top 100)	37
Italian Albums (FIMI)	45
Norwegian Albums (VG-lista)	40
Portuguese Albums (AFP)	6
Spanish Albums (Promusicae)	29
Swedish Albums (Sverigetopplistan)	31
Swiss Albums (Schweizer Hitparade)	33
US Billboard 200	154

== Certifications and sales ==
Region	Certification	Certified units/sales
United States (RIAA)	Platinum	200,000^{^}
^{^} Shipments figures based on certification alone.
