= Michael Jackson's Ghosts =

1996 American short film

- Promotional poster
- Directed by: Stan Winston
- Screenplay by: Stan Winston; Mick Garris
- Story by: Michael Jackson; Stephen King; Mick Garris
- Produced by: Michael Jackson; Stan Winston; David Nicksay
- Starring: Michael Jackson
- Cinematography: Russell Carpenter
- Edited by: Marcus Manton
- Music by: Michael Jackson (songs); Nicholas Pike (score)
- Production companies: MJJ Productions; Kingdom Entertainment; Optimum Productions
- Distributed by: SMV Enterprises
- Release dates: October 25, 1996; May 8, 1997 (Cannes)
- Running time: 39 minutes
- Country: United States
- Language: English
- Budget: $15 million ($31 million in 2025 dollars)

Michael Jackson's Ghosts is a 1996 short film starring Michael Jackson, directed by Stan Winston, and written by Stephen King and Mick Garris. It is based on a story by Garris, Jackson and King.

Ghosts tells the story of an eccentric man with supernatural powers being forced out of a small town by its judgmental mayor. Jackson plays five roles, and performs dance routines set to the songs "2 Bad", "Is It Scary" and "Ghosts", taken from his albums HIStory (1995) and Blood on the Dance Floor: HIStory in the Mix (1997). The AV Club described Ghosts as an allegory for Jackson's life and pop culture status.

Ghosts was filmed and released in 1996 along with select prints of the horror film Thinner, and was first publicly screened at the 1997 Cannes Film Festival. It was released internationally a year later on LaserDisc, VHS and Video CD.

== Plot ==
The mayor of Normal Valley leads a mob to the mansion of the Maestro (Jackson), who has been entertaining local children with magic tricks and ghost stories. The children assure the parents the Maestro has done nothing wrong, but the mayor intends to banish him as a "freak".

The Maestro challenges the mayor to a "scaring contest": the first to become scared must leave. He performs magic tricks and dance routines with a ghostly horde, then possesses the mayor, forcing him to dance. After the performance, the Maestro agrees to leave and crumbles to dust, but returns as an enormous ghoul. Terrified, the mayor leaps through the window. The families agree that they had fun and allow the Maestro to stay.

== Production ==
Ghosts began production in 1993 under the title Is This Scary? with the director Mick Garris. It was planned for release in conjunction with the 1993 family comedy film Addams Family Values. The original video featured Christina Ricci and Jimmy Workman reprising their roles as Wednesday and Pugsley Addams, as well as future Scrubs star Ken Jenkins as the Mayor. Jackson backed out of the deal, returning an estimated $5 million, and the Addams Family connection was dropped. Stan Winston, previously in charge of makeup and visual effects, took over as director when Garris left to make the Shining miniseries. According to Garris, Ghosts was the most expensive music video ever made, at around $15 million, all paid for by Jackson.

== Cast ==
- Michael Jackson as Maestro/Mayor/Mayor Ghoul/Superghoul/Skeleton
- Pat Dade as Pat
- Amy Smallman as Amy
- Edwina Moore as Edwina
- Dante Beze as Dante
- Seth Smith as Seth
- Kendall Cunningham as Kendall
- Loren Randolph as Loren
- Heather Ehlers as Heather

=== Choreographers ===
- Michael Jackson
- LaVelle Smith Jr.
- Travis Payne
- Barry Lather

=== Dancers ===
- Michael Balderrama
- Troy Burgess
- John "Havic" Gregory
- M.G. Gong
- Heather Hayes
- Paula Harrison
- Shawnette Heard
- Cris Judd
- Richard Kim
- Dorie Konno
- Kelly Konno
- Suzi McDonald
- Courtney Miller, Jr
- Nikki Pantenburg
- Travis Payne
- Mia Pitts
- Charlie E. Schmidt
- Joie Shettler
- Yuko Sumida
- Anthony Talauega
- Richmond Talauega
- Lisa Joann Thompson
- Mic Thompson
- Stacy Walker
- Michelle Weber
- Jason Yribar

== Release ==
Ghosts was screened out of competition at the 1997 Cannes Film Festival. At over 38 minutes long, it held the Guinness world record for the longest music video until 2013, when it was eclipsed by Pharrell Williams' "Happy". In 2020, the film was available on Jackson’s YouTube channel from October 29 to November 1.

=== Home media ===
In December 1997, towards the end of promotion for Michael Jackson's remix album Blood on the Dance Floor, a Deluxe Collector Box Set of Ghosts was released in a few territories including Europe and Japan. The box set included a VHS tape release of Jackson's Ghosts mini-movie on home video, the Blood on the Dance Floor album on CD and a CD maxi single, Limited Edition Minimax CD. "On the Line" was the first track on this single. According to the British Phonographic Industry, the Box Set (Cat No. 4891552) was released in the UK on December 1, 1997 and debuted at #8 on the Music Video Chart reaching #1 on February 14, 1998, ultimately selling 25,000 units.

== Reception ==
The A.V. Club writer Nathan Rabin described Ghosts as "clunky, leaden and overblown", and said it was a "staggeringly blunt" allegory for Jackson's life and pop culture status. He attributed its failure to Jackson's place in the public imagination at the time, following his recent divorce from Lisa Marie Presley and the 1993 child molestation allegations against him.

In retrospect Director Stan Winston said: “I’m still proud of the way 'Ghosts' turned out, though. And I really enjoyed making the film with Michael. He was a complete professional throughout the process — the consummate performer.”

== Charts and certifications ==
Weekly chart performance for "Michael Jackson's Ghosts"
Chart (1997-1998)	Peak position
UK Music Video Chart (OCC)	1

Sales certifications for Michael Jackson's Ghosts
Region	Certification	Certified units/sales
France (SNEP)	2× Platinum	40,000^{*}
United Kingdom (BPI)	Gold	25,000^{^}
^{^} Shipments figures based on certification alone.

== On the Line ==
"On the Line"

Single by Michael Jackson
- B-side: "Ghosts" (Mousse T's Radio Rock Singalong Remix); "Is It Scary" (DJ Greek's Scary Mix)
- Released: January 11, 1997
- Recorded: 1996
- Genre: R&B; pop; soul
- Length: 4:39 (short version); 4:53 (long version)
- Label: Epic; Sony Music
- Songwriters: Babyface; Jackson (The Ultimate Collection)
- Producer: Babyface

Michael Jackson singles chronology
"Stranger in Moscow" (1996)	"On the Line" (1997)	"Blood on the Dance Floor" (1997)

"On the Line" is a song written and produced by Babyface. Michael Jackson performs the track and is also credited in its writing (on the writing credits of The Ultimate Collection). It was originally recorded by Jackson for the Spike Lee film Get on the Bus (1996), but it was not featured on the soundtrack.

The full-length version of the song was released on November 16, 2004 as an album track of his limited edition box set The Ultimate Collection.

=== Personnel ===
- Written and composed by Babyface
- Produced by Babyface
- Solo and background vocals by Michael Jackson

=== Track listing ===
Limited Edition Minimax CD (EPC 665268 2)

1. "On the Line" (Short Version) – 4:37
2. "Ghosts" (Mousse T's Radio Rock Singalong Remix) – 4:25
3. "Is It Scary" (DJ Greek's Scary Mix) – 7:12

== See also ==
- Michael Jackson's Thriller (music video)
- Michael Jackson: The Legend Continues
- List of most expensive music videos
