= Is It Scary =

- European promo CD single

Promotional single by Michael Jackson

from the album Blood on the Dance Floor: HIStory in the Mix
- B-side: "Off the Wall" (Junior Vasquez remix)
- Released: September 7, 1997
- Recorded: 1994–1995
- Genre: Funk rock; gothic pop
- Length: 5:35 (album version); 4:11 (radio edit)
- Label: Epic
- Songwriters: Michael Jackson; Jimmy Jam and Terry Lewis
- Producers: Michael Jackson; Jimmy Jam and Terry Lewis

Licensed audio
- "Is It Scary" on YouTube

"Is It Scary" is a song by American singer-songwriter Michael Jackson. The song was written in 1994 during sessions for Jackson's 1995 album HIStory: Past, Present and Future, Book I, but it was not included on the album. It was later released on Jackson's 1997 remix album Blood on the Dance Floor: HIStory in the Mix. "Is It Scary" was written and produced by Jackson, Jimmy Jam and Terry Lewis.

"Is It Scary" received mixed reviews from contemporary music critics. Musically, the song was viewed by music critics as showing a "darker side" of Jackson, and compared the song's composition to the music of Marilyn Manson. In November 1997, a radio edit version of the song was released as a promotional single in the Netherlands, while promo singles containing remixes were released in the United States and the United Kingdom.

== Background ==
The song was among those considered for inclusion on Jackson's 1995 double album HIStory: Past, Present and Future, Book I, but it was not chosen as it did not complement the other tracks on the album. Jackson subsequently re-recorded the song for his 1996 short film Ghosts. Jackson, Harris and Lewis were given producing credit for the song on Blood on the Dance Floor.

A remix of "Is It Scary", called "DJ Greek's Scary Mix", was included on a three-track 'minimax' CD single that was released as part of the Ghosts Deluxe Collector Box Set. Remixes of "Is It Scary" were also included on Jackson's cancelled single "Smile". The radio edit for "Is It Scary" was later included on the third disc of the deluxe edition of Jackson's greatest hits album King of Pop in 2008 in the United Kingdom. "Is It Scary" was also featured on the deluxe edition of King of Pop in France. Samples of "Is It Scary" and "Threatened" (from Jackson's tenth studio album Invincible) are featured in the "Thriller" segment of the concert documentary film, Michael Jackson's This Is It (2009). Tommy D. also produced a remix of the song, but this mix was never officially released.

== Promotion ==
"Is It Scary" was never lifted as a commercial single, but it was given out to radio stations and dance clubs to promote Blood on the Dance Floor: HIStory in the Mix. Promo CD singles containing a radio edit and 12" promos containing three remixes of the song were released to the Netherlands. The United States and the United Kingdom received 12" promo singles containing remixes of the song by Deep Dish, while the UK also received 12" promos with remixes of the song by Eddie Arroyo known as "Eddie's Love Mixes". Due to lack of a full release, "Is It Scary" did not enter any music charts.

== Critical reception ==
"Is It Scary" received mixed reviews from contemporary music critics. Jim Farber, writer for the New York Daily News, commented that "Is It Scary" "boasts a few innovative sounds but no real melodies". Roger Catlin of The Hartford Courant stated that "the most intriguing pairing" was "Ghosts" and "Is It Scary" because Jackson "asks those who've only read about him in tabloids if he seems monstrous". Anthony Violanti, a writer for The Buffalo News, remarked that Blood on the Dance Floor: HIStory in the Mix's songs "Superfly Sister", "Ghosts" and "Is It Scary" were "programmed plastic soul that makes you wonder how someone as talented as Jackson can churn out such tracks".

Jae-Ha Kim, a writer for Chicago Sun-Times, noted, that "Is It Scary" shows a "darker side of Jackson than even the tabloids would have you believe". Neil Strauss, a writer for The New York Times, described "Is It Scary" as "sounding more like the ghoulish rocker Marilyn Manson than the Motown prodigy that he is". A longtime commentator on Jackson's public life, J. Randy Taraborrelli, gave a retrospective analysis on Blood on the Dance Floor: HIStory in the Mix's critical reviews in the biography, The Magic & the Madness (2004). Taraborrelli argued that certain sections of the world took interest in tabloid stories about Jackson's personal life over his musical career.

== Track listings ==
Promo CD single

1. "Is It Scary" (Radio Edit) – 4:11

Promo 12" single

1. "Is It Scary" (Deep Dish Dark and Scary Remix) – 12:07
2. "Is It Scary" (Eddie's Rub-a-Dub Mix) – 5:00
3. "Is It Scary" (Eddie's Love Mix) – 8:00
4. "Off the Wall" (Junior Vasquez Remix) – 4:57

== Remixes ==
Eddie Arroyo mixes

- "Is It Scary" (Eddie's Love Mix) – 8:00
- "Is It Scary" (Eddie's Love Mix Radio Edit) – 3:50
- "Is It Scary" (Eddie's Rub-a-Dub Mix) – 4:33
- "Is It Scary" (Downtempo Groove Mix) – 4:32

Deep Dish mixes

- "Is It Scary" (Deep Dish Dark & Scary Remix) – 12:07
- "Is It Scary" (Deep Dish Dark & Scary Radio Edit) – 4:38
- "Is It Scary" (Deep Dish Double-O-Jazz Dub) – 8:35

Chris "The Greek" Panaghi mix

- "Is It Scary" (DJ Greek Scary Remix) – 7:11

Tommy D mix

- "Is It Scary" (Tommy D's Death Row Mix) – 4:15

== Bibliography ==
- Taraborrelli, J. Randy (2004). The Magic and the Madness. Terra Alta, WV: Headline. ISBN 0-330-42005-4.
