= Blood on the Dance Floor: HIStory in the Mix =

1997 remix album by Michael Jackson

Remix album by Michael Jackson
- Released: May 14, 1997
- Recorded: 1990–1997
- Genres: R&B; pop; industrial; hip-hop; house; funk; new jack swing
- Length: 75:55 (CD); 79:30 (LP)
- Labels: Epic; Sony; MJJ
- Producers: Michael Jackson; Teddy Riley; Jimmy Jam & Terry Lewis; Janet Jackson; Terry Farley; Pete Heller; Te-Bass; Pras; Todd Terry; David Morales; Bruce Swedien; René Moore; Dallas Austin; David Foster; Bill Bottrell; R. Kelly; Frankie Knuckles; Satoshi Tomiie; Tony Moran; Bob Rosa

Michael Jackson chronology
HIStory: Past, Present and Future, Book I (1995)	Blood on the Dance Floor: HIStory in the Mix (1997)	20th Century Masters – The Millennium Collection: The Best of Michael Jackson (2000)

Singles from Blood on the Dance Floor: HIStory in the Mix
- 1. "Blood on the Dance Floor" Released: March 21, 1997; 2. "HIStory" / "Ghosts" Released: July 30, 1997

Blood on the Dance Floor: HIStory in the Mix is a remix album by the American singer Michael Jackson. It was released on May 14, 1997, by Epic Records, and is the second album also released by MJJ Productions, Jackson's record label. The album comprises eight remixes of songs from Jackson's ninth studio album, HIStory: Past, Present and Future, Book I (1995), and five new songs that failed to make previous albums. Jackson was involved primarily with the production of the new material; the remixes were produced by other artists. Blood on the Dance Floor: HIStory in the Mix incorporates R&B, pop, industrial, hip-hop, house, funk and new jack swing. It concerns themes such as drug addiction, sex, relationships, and paranoia.

Though Blood on the Dance Floor received minimal promotion by Jackson's standards, particularly in the United States, the short film Michael Jackson's Ghosts, two singles ("Blood on the Dance Floor" and "Ghosts"), a promotional single ("Is It Scary"), and a music video were issued as promotion. Although initial sales in the United States were seen as disappointing for Jackson, it reached number one throughout Europe, including in France, Belgium, Spain, the UK, and New Zealand. Michael Jackson's Ghosts premiered at the Cannes Film Festival, as part of the Blood on the Dance Floor promotion. The short film, also considered the official music video for "Ghosts", won the Bob Fosse Award for Best Choreography in a Music Video.

Reviews for Blood on the Dance Floor were mixed, with some critics feeling that Jackson had already explored these musical themes and others criticizing what they perceived as weak vocals. Other critics were more favorable, noting the album for its incorporation of genres Jackson previously had not explored, justifying the use of previous themes but with "brutal honesty". Blood on the Dance Floor: has sold over six million copies worldwide, making it the best-selling remix album in history. On October 20, 2000, it was certified platinum in the US.

== Production and music ==
"Morphine"
Excerpt of the track "Morphine".

The album was produced while Jackson was preoccupied with the HIStory World Tour. He reportedly was impressed by Euro-dance remixes in Munich, some of which he personally financed to be extended in order to be included in the album, and Trinidadian beat-music. Thus, the songs were produced in a variety of countries that included Sweden, Switzerland and Germany. The album comprises eight remixes of songs from HIStory—"Scream", "Money", "2 Bad", "Stranger in Moscow", "This Time Around", "Earth Song", "You Are Not Alone", and "HIStory"—and five new songs—"Blood on the Dance Floor", "Morphine", "Superfly Sister", "Ghosts", and "Is It Scary".

Jackson was heavily involved in the writing, composition, and production of the five new songs, and sang all of the lead vocals. Todd Terry remixed "Stranger in Moscow", Jimmy Jam and Terry Lewis remixed "Scream", and The Fugees worked on the new track "Blood on the Dance Floor" and the remix of "2 Bad". Wyclef Jean, a member of The Fugees, told MTV of his involvement in the production, "We did a first remix for Michael, and he wanted us to do another one". The group spoke of their excitement at receiving a phone call from Jackson.

"Morphine" was a particularly dark track which contains an audio clip from The Elephant Man, courtesy of Paramount Pictures. Robert Chausow was a studio violinist working in New York, when he was called on a Sunday morning to travel to the Hit Factory to lay down tracks for an upcoming project. Security at the studio was high. Chausow did not know which artist for whom he was playing. He arrived at the studio which was dimly lit, sitting with Juliet Hafner, a fellow musician, who happened to know Brad Buxer, longtime producer of Jackson's work. They could both hear Jackson lay down his vocal tracks through the monitor speakers with Buxer. After Jackson finished, the musicians were asked to listen to the track several times and thereafter "Play this. In this part, play eight measures of.....". The two musicians had no clue as to the title of the new track and the experience of playing music in a dark studio was described as surreal. After around an hour to an hour and a half, the musicians were no longer needed. Chausow was asked not to talk about the experience until after the project was complete, which was a common request in the studio circuit. On this song, Jackson was the sole arranger, doing such to the classical, vocal and orchestral aspects. Jackson also played solo percussion and drums and received joint guitar credit alongside longtime collaborator Slash. Andrae Crouch's choir is also featured on the piece. "Morphine"'s central theme is the drug usage of Demerol. In the track, he sings, "Trust in me/Just in me/Put all your trust in me/You're doin' morphine...Go on babe/Relax/This won't hurt you/Before I put it in/Close your eyes and count to ten/Don't cry/I won't convert you/There's no need to dismay/Close your eyes and drift away".

"Scream Louder" contains elements from "Thank You (Falettinme Be Mice Elf Agin)", performed by Sly and the Family Stone. "2 Bad" contains a recreation of a melody line of Jackson's 1983 hit "Beat It" as well as a rap by John Forté and guitar solo by Wyclef Jean.

== Packaging, release and promotion ==
The 23-page album booklet contains the lyrics to "Blood on the Dance Floor", "Stranger in Moscow" and "HIStory". The eight remixes from HIStory are given additional titles such as "Flyte Tyme Remix" and "Tee's In-House Club Mix". The booklet contains many images from the HIStory World Tour and Ghosts film. Towards the end of the booklet, Jackson pays respect to friends such as Elizabeth Taylor and Elton John, his family, employees and fans.

In the United Kingdom, the album was released by Epic Records on May 14, 1997. HIStory on Film, Volume II was released on May 20—a video collection of Jackson's music videos and television performances from the HIStory era of 1995–1997. Compared to other Jackson albums, it was not widely promoted. The New York Times described the US promotional effort as "subdued", creating "hardly a sound" and "perplexing to many people in the industry". Jackson's label, Epic Records, refuted allegations they were not promoting the album sufficiently in the United States, saying, "We are completely behind the album ... Michael is certainly one of our superstars and is treated as such ... We just went into this one with our global hats on." The New York Times acknowledged that promotion was stronger internationally, where Jackson had more commercial force and popularity. Jackson effectively no longer needed the US market to have a hit record. By June 1997, only ten percent of sales from Jackson's prior studio album came from within the United States.

At the Cannes Film Festival, Jackson premiered the film Ghosts as part of the album promotion. It was released theatrically in the United States in October 1996 and, in the UK, debuted at the Odeon Leicester Square in May 1997. The UK event attracted fans, media and business organizations. It was released on cassette in most parts of the world. The film was written by Jackson and Stephen King and directed by Stan Winston. The story was based loosely on the events and isolation Jackson felt after he was accused of child sexual abuse in 1993. In the plot, the Maestro—played by Jackson—is nearly chased out of his town by the residents and the mayor—who deliberately looks very similar to Tom Sneddon—because they believe him to be a "freak". The film had similar imagery and themes to that of Thriller. It features many special effects and dance moves choreographed to original music, which Jackson himself authored. The film includes several songs and music videos from the albums HIStory and Blood on the Dance Floor: HIStory in the Mix. Ghosts is over thirty-eight minutes long and previously held the Guinness World Record for the world's longest music video. It won the Bob Fosse Award for Best Choreography in a Music Video.

Blood on the Dance Floor was also promoted with the singles "Blood on the Dance Floor" and "HIStory" / "Ghosts" and music videos. The video for "Blood on the Dance Floor" premiered on Top of the Pops. It centered on Susie seducing Jackson in a courtship dance, before opening a switchblade. The lead single peaked at number one in several countries, including the United Kingdom. The double A-side "HIStory" / "Ghosts" was promoted with a video for each song. "HIStory" was set in a nightclub, in a futuristic era, and recalled Jackson's filmography. "Ghosts" was a five-minute clip taken from the much longer film Ghosts. The double A-side would become a top-five hit in the United Kingdom, but did not chart as highly elsewhere.

== Commercial performance ==
Initial sales in the United States were seen as disappointing for Jackson. Blood on the Dance Floor peaked at number 24 on the US Billboard 200 chart and after four weeks the record had sold 92,000 copies. Despite this, long term sales were stronger. It was certified platinum in May 2000, for shipments of at least a million units. It was certified Gold in Canada for a minimum of 50,000 shipments.

In Europe the record has been certified for shipments of at least two million copies. Blood on the Dance Floor: HIStory in the Mix debuted atop the UK album chart, by July 1997 it had sold 250,000 units in the United Kingdom and 445,000 units in Germany. In Australia, debuted at number 2 with 60,000 advance copies. The album also peaked at number one in France, Belgium, Spain and New Zealand. Since its debut, the album has sold an estimated six million copies worldwide, making it the best selling remix album ever released.

== Critical reception ==
Professional ratings
Review scores
Source	Rating
AllMusic	2/5 stars
The Atlanta Journal and The Atlanta Constitution	D
Entertainment Weekly	C−
Music Week	4/5 stars
New York Daily News	(negative)
The New York Times	(positive)
NME	3/10
Rolling Stone	3/5 stars
Uncut	3/5 stars
The Virginian-Pilot	(positive)

Jim Farber of New York Daily News labeled the album's theme, "Predatory women, jealous underlings and the evil media continue to obsess him. He's once again playing the victim—the world's most powerless billionaire, it seems—mewling about forces conspiring against his heavenly self." He said of the lead single, "[Jackson] coughs up a series of strangulated mutters and munchkin hiccups in lieu of a vocal, while its chilly, faux-industrial music proves as appealing as a migraine. ... 'Ghosts' and 'Is It Scary' boast a few innovative sounds but no real melodies." Thor Christensen of The Dallas Morning News noted the album focused on "angry tales about a coldhearted 'Superfly Sister' or the back-stabbing women in 'Ghosts' and 'Blood on the Dance Floor'. Three of the five new songs on this remix album...involve mean, psychotic ex-lovers". He observed, "The dark, cryptic 'Morphine' is easily one of the most ambitious songs he's ever recorded. He fuels the song with narcotic industrial funk—lookout Trent Reznor—but then dilutes it by sticking [in] 90 seconds of goopy, string-laden balladry."

Neil Strauss of The New York Times gave the album a positive review, saying the record, "put Mr. Jackson halfway on the road to a very interesting concept album. There is real pain and pathos in these new songs...[he] frets about painkillers, sexual promiscuity and public image. In many of them, Mr. Jackson seems like The Elephant Man, screaming that he is a human being...With beats crashing like metal sheets and synthesizer sounds hissing like pressurized gas, this is industrial funk." He favorably compared Jackson's performance of "Is It Scary" to rock singer Marilyn Manson and noted the lyrics, "If you want to see eccentric oddities, I'll be grotesque before your eyes". Strauss suggested that the predatory woman, "Susie", from the title track, was a metaphor for AIDS. Finally, he described "Morphine" as "chilling... Mr. Jackson sings seductively from the point of view of the drug itself...he intones sweetly". Roger Catlin of The Hartford Courant stated, "The most intriguing pairing is 'Ghosts' and 'Is It Scary' in which he asks those who've only read about him in tabloids if he seems monstrous." The Cincinnati Post described the lead single as a "lackluster first release...dated, played-out dance track", but gave the album an overall favorable analysis. The review described "Ghosts" and "Is It Scary" as "classic Jackson paranoia".

Anthony Violenti of The Buffalo News said of the lead single, "[it is] laced with Teddy Riley's new jack swing sound and a pounding techno beat". Violenti added, "'Superfly Sister', 'Ghosts' and 'Is It Scary' are programmed plastic soul that makes you wonder how someone as talented as Jackson can churn out such tracks". He said of "Morphine", "[it] has more synthesized beats and quickly fades into Jackson's current indistinguishable style". Music critic, Adam Gilham was particularly impressed with the musical sequence of the track, noting that Michael Jackson created a "moment of absolute genius". William Ruhlman of AllMusic said of the lead track, "'Blood on the Dance Floor' is an uptempo Jackson song in the increasingly hysterical tradition of 'Billie Jean' and 'Smooth Criminal' with Jackson huffing, puffing, and yelping through some nonsense about a stabbing ... over a fairly generic electronic dance track. Stephen Thomas Erlewine, also of AllMusic, had a negative reaction to the record. He said that all five new tracks were, "embarrassingly weak, sounding tired, predictable and, well, bloodless". He described "Blood on the Dance Floor" as a "bleak reworking of 'Jam' and 'Scream'".

Chris Dickinson of St. Louis Post-Dispatch, noted, "'Superfly Sister' comes on like a classic Michael dance track, with Michael and Bryan Loren playing all the instruments...Blood On the Dance Floor [album] is definitely a dance record. It's not Thriller or Bad or even Off the Wall and it's not trying to be." Jae-Ha Kim of Chicago Sun-Times, noted "'Is It Scary' shows a darker side of Jackson than even the tabloids would have you believe...With the hypnotic 'Morphine', he sounds like a seductive cousin of Trent Reznor's." Sonia Murray of The Atlanta Journal and The Atlanta Constitution gave the album a D grade. She claimed that "'Ghosts' pounds with funk until Jackson's weak vocals come in." She described "Morphine" as an "overblown rock hiss". The Virginian-Pilot gave the album a positive review, also expressing the opinion that "Morphine" sounded "eerily like 'State of Shock'", and continued, "'Scream Louder' a remix of his hit duet with sister Janet, is better than the original only because it takes away the overpowering guitar twangs." The Washington Post described "Superfly Sister" as "sex funk", adding, "'Morphine' apparently told from the drug's point of view and featuring both the Andrae Crouch Singers and an orchestra, alternates between a hard-edged rock and operatic pop."

=== Retrospective reception ===
A Jackson biographer, J. Randy Taraborrelli, gave a retrospective analysis of the album in the biography, The Magic & the Madness. He felt the album "contained...kick-ass dance remixes...Several of the other songs on Blood are also memorable...The collection was not a success in America; it was dismissed by critics and much of his audience, who seemed confused as to whether it was a new release or some kind of hybrid combination of songs". He felt that "Blood on the Dance Floor" was one of Jackson's best songs, but that the U.S. public was more interested in the controversial tabloid stories about his personal life.

William Ruhlman of AllMusic, agreed that part of the blame for a perceived commercial disappointment in the United States could be attributed to the ongoing public interest in Jackson's private life. Nonetheless, Ruhlman felt the album was artistically disappointing. In 2005, J T Griffith, of AllMusic, believed that in hindsight, "Blood on the Dance Floor" was a good song. He explained, "[it is] a second-rate mixture of 'Beat It' and 'Thriller' but Jackson's missteps are better than most pop music out there. This track showcases all the artist's trademarks: the ooohing, the grunts, and funky basslines. It is hard to hear 'Blood on the Dance Floor' and not want to moonwalk or dance like a ghoul".

== Track listing ==
No.	Title	Writer(s)	Producer(s)	Length
1.	"Blood on the Dance Floor"	Michael Jackson; Teddy Riley	M. Jackson; Riley	4:13
2.	"Morphine"	M. Jackson	M. Jackson	6:29
3.	"Superfly Sister"	M. Jackson; Bryan Loren	M. Jackson	6:28
4.	"Ghosts"	M. Jackson; Riley	M. Jackson; Riley	5:14
5.	"Is It Scary"	M. Jackson; James Harris III; Terry Lewis	M. Jackson; Harris III; Lewis	5:36
6.	"Scream Louder" (Flyte Tyme Remix) (duet with Janet Jackson)	Harris III; Lewis; M. Jackson; J. Jackson	Harris III; Lewis; M. Jackson; J. Jackson	5:27
7.	"Money" (Fire Island Radio Edit)	M. Jackson	M. Jackson; Terry Farley^{[a]}; Pete Heller^{[a]}	4:23
8.	"2 Bad" (Refugee Camp Mix) (featuring John Forté)	M. Jackson; Bruce Swedien; René Moore; Dallas Austin	M. Jackson; Harris III; Lewis; Wyclef Jean^{[a]}; Pras^{[b]}; Te-Bass^{[b]}	3:33
9.	"Stranger in Moscow" (Tee's In-House Club Mix)	M. Jackson	M. Jackson; Todd Terry^{[a]}	6:54
10.	"This Time Around" (D.M. Radio Mix)	M. Jackson; Austin	M. Jackson; Austin; David Morales^{[a]}	4:05
11.	"Earth Song" (Hani's Club Experience)	M. Jackson	M. Jackson; Hani^{[a]}	7:55
12.	"You Are Not Alone" (Classic Club Mix)	R. Kelly	M. Jackson; Kelly; Frankie Knuckles^{[a]}	7:37
13.	"HIStory" (Tony Moran's HIStory Lesson)	M. Jackson; Harris III; Lewis	M. Jackson; Harris III; Lewis; Tony Moran^{[a]}; Bob Rosa^{[b]}	8:01

- ^{^[a]} signifies a remixer.
- ^{^[b]} signifies an additional producer.
- "Morphine" contains an audio clip from the film The Elephant Man (1980).
- "Scream Louder" (Flyte Tyme Remix) contains elements of "Thank You (Falettinme Be Mice Elf Agin)" by Sly and the Family Stone.
- "Morphine" is titled "Just Say No" on some editions of the album or omitted entirely.
- The LP edition replaces "This Time Around" (D.M. Radio Mix) and "You Are Not Alone" (Classic Club Mix) with "This Time Around" (D.M. Mad Club Mix) and "You Are Not Alone" (Classic Club Edit).

== Personnel ==
"Blood on the Dance Floor" Written, composed, and produced by Michael Jackson and Teddy Riley

- Engineered by Teddy Riley, Dave Way and Mick Guzauski
- Mixed by Mick Guzauski
- Keyboard, synthesizer, drum programming by Brad Buxer and Teddy Riley

"Morphine" (Originally Titled "Just Say No") Written by, Composed by, Arranged by, lead and backing vocals, guitar, percussion, drums by Michael Jackson

- Guitar performed by Slash
- Engineered by Keith Cohen, Eddie DeLena, Mick Guzauski and Tim Boyle
- Mixed by Keith Cohen
- Keyboards by Brad Buxer and Keith Cohen
- Percussion by Brad Buxer and Bryan Loren
- Synthesizer, grand piano by Brad Buxer

"Superfly Sister" Written and produced by Michael Jackson Composed and arranged by Michael Jackson and Bryan Loren

- Recorded by Richard Cottrell and Dave Way
- Rhythm guitar, soloist (guitar), drum programming, programmed by, keyboards, synthesizer by Bryan Loren

"Ghosts" Written, composed, and produced by Michael Jackson and Teddy Riley

- Engineered by Teddy Riley and Eddie DeLena
- Mixed by Dave Way
- Drum programming by Alex Breuer, Andrew Scheps, Doug Grigsby, Matt Carpenter and Rob Hoffman
- Keyboards, synthesizer by Brad Buxer, Doug Grigsby and Teddy Riley

"Is It Scary" Written and composed by Michael Jackson, James Harris III and Terry Lewis

- Produced by Jimmy Jam & Terry Lewis, and Michael Jackson
- Arrangement by Michael Jackson, Jimmy Jam & Terry Lewis
- Vocal arrangement by Michael Jackson
- All instruments performed by Jimmy Jam & Terry Lewis, Michael Jackson
- Recorded and mixed by Steve Hodge
- Drum programming by Jeff Taylor
- Piano by Michael Jackson

"Scream Louder (Flyte Tyme Remix)" Written and composed by James Harris III and Terry Lewis, Michael Jackson and Janet Jackson

- Produced by Jimmy Jam & Terry Lewis, Michael Jackson and Janet Jackson
- Additional production and remix by Jimmy Jam & Terry Lewis

"2 Bad (Refugee Camp Mix)" Song and lyrics written by Michael Jackson Music composed by Bruce Swedien, René Moore and Dallas Austin

- Produced by Michael Jackson, Jimmy Jam & Terry Lewis
- Remix and guitar by Wyclef Jean
- Additional production by Te-Bass and Pras
- Rap by John Forte
- Bass by Te-Bass
- Mixed and engineered by Warren Riker
- Scratches by Funkmaster Flex

"Stranger in Moscow (Tee's In-House Club Mix)" Written, composed, and produced by Michael Jackson

- Additional production and remix by Todd Terry
- Engineered by Bill Klatt
- Edited by Matthias Heilbronn

"This Time Around (D.M. Radio Mix)" Song & lyrics written by Michael Jackson Music composed by Dallas Austin

- Produced by Dallas Austin and Michael Jackson
- Remix and additional production by David Morales
- Engineered by David Sussman
- Keyboards by Satoshi Tomiie and Joe Moskowitz
- Horns arranged by Paul Sharipo & Company
- Percussion by Steve Thornton

"Earth Song (Hani's Club Experience)" Written and composed by Michael Jackson

- Produced by Michael Jackson, Bill Bottrell and David Foster
- Remixed and recycled by Hani
- Edited by Vlado Meller and Frank Ceraolo

"You Are Not Alone (Classic Club Mix)" Written and composed by R. Kelly

- Produced by R. Kelly and Michael Jackson
- Remix by Frankie Knuckles
- Additional production by Frankie Knuckles and Satoshi Tomiie
- Engineered by John Poppo
- Keyboard programming by Terry Burrus

"Money (Fire Island Radio Edit)" Written, composed, and produced by Michael Jackson

- Remix and additional production by Terry Farley & Pete Heller
- Engineered by Gary Wilkinson

"HIStory (Tony Moran's HIStory Lesson)" Written and composed by Michael Jackson, James Harris III and Terry Lewis

- Produced by Michael Jackson, Jimmy Jam & Terry Lewis
- Remix by Tony Moran
- Additional production by Tony Moran and Bob Rosa
- Mixed by Bob Rosa
- Engineered and programming by Tony Coluccio
- Additional programming by Giuseppe D.

== Charts ==
=== Weekly charts ===
Chart (1997)	Peak position
Australian Albums (ARIA)	2
Austrian Albums (Ö3 Austria)	2
Belgian Albums (Ultratop Flanders)	1
Belgian Albums (Ultratop Wallonia)	2
Canadian Albums (Billboard)	16
Czech Albums (ČNS IFPI)	21
Danish Albums (Hitlisten)	1
Dutch Albums (Album Top 100)	1
Estonian Albums (Eesti Top 10)	1
European Top 100 Albums (Music & Media)	1
Finnish Albums (Suomen virallinen lista)	3
French Albums (SNEP)	1
German Albums (Offizielle Top 100)	2
Hungarian Albums (MAHASZ)	5
Irish Albums (IRMA)	2
Italian Albums (FIMI)	3
New Zealand Albums (RMNZ)	1
Norwegian Albums (VG-lista)	2
Scottish Albums (Official Charts)	3
Spanish Albums (PROMUSICAE)	1
Swedish Albums (Sverigetopplistan)	4
Swiss Albums (Schweizer Hitparade)	2
Taiwanese International Albums (IFPI)	1
UK Albums (OCC)	1
US Billboard 200	24
US Top R&B/Hip-Hop Albums (Billboard)	12

=== Year-end charts ===
Chart (1997)	Position
Australian Albums (ARIA)	65
Austrian Albums (Ö3 Austria)	20
Belgian Albums (Ultratop Flanders)	27
Belgian Albums (Ultratop Wallonia)	20
Danish Albums (Hitlisten)	14
Dutch Albums (Album Top 100)	12
European Top 100 Albums (Music & Media)	13
French Albums (SNEP)	22
German Albums (Offizielle Top 100)	19
New Zealand Albums (RMNZ)	38
Norwegian Albums (VG-lista)	62
Swedish Albums (Sverigetopplistan)	83
Swiss Albums (Schweizer Hitparade)	17
UK Albums (OCC)	70

== Certifications and sales ==
Region	Certification	Certified units/sales
Australia (ARIA)	Platinum	70,000^{^}
Austria (IFPI Austria)	Gold	25,000^{*}
Belgium (BRMA)	Platinum	50,000^{*}
Canada (Music Canada)	Gold	50,000^{^}
Denmark (IFPI Danmark)	2× Platinum	100,000^{^}
Finland (Musiikkituottajat)	Gold	23,162
France (SNEP)	Platinum	300,000^{*}
Germany (BVMI)	Gold	445,000
Hong Kong (IFPI Hong Kong)	Platinum	20,000^{*}
Italy	—	190,000
Italy (FIMI) sales since 2009	Gold	30,000^{*}
Japan (RIAJ)	Gold	100,000^{^}
Netherlands (NVPI)	Platinum	100,000^{^}
New Zealand (RMNZ)	Platinum	15,000^{^}
Norway (IFPI Norway)	Gold	25,000^{*}
Poland (ZPAV)	Gold	50,000^{*}
South Africa (RISA)	Platinum	50,000^{‡}
Spain (Promusicae)	Platinum	100,000^{^}
Switzerland (IFPI Switzerland)	Platinum	50,000^{^}
United Kingdom (BPI)	Platinum	300,000^{‡}
United States (RIAA)	Platinum	1,000,000^{^}
Summaries
Europe (IFPI)	2× Platinum	2,000,000^{*}
Worldwide	—	6,000,000
^{*} Sales figures based on certification alone.^{^} Shipments figures based on certification alone.^{‡} Sales+streaming figures based on certification alone.
