= Blood on the Dance Floor (song) =

Single by Michael Jackson

from the album Blood on the Dance Floor: HIStory in the Mix
- B-side: "Dangerous" (Roger's Dangerous Club Mix)
- Released: March 21, 1997
- Recorded: 1991; 1997
- Genre: dance; funk; new jack swing
- Length: 4:12: 3:32 (radio edit)
- Label: Epic
- Songwriters: Michael Jackson; Teddy Riley
- Producers: Michael Jackson; Teddy Riley

Michael Jackson singles chronology
"On the Line" (1997)	"Blood on the Dance Floor" (1997)	"HIStory" / "Ghosts" (1997)

Music video
- "Blood on the Dance Floor" on YouTube

Audio sample
- file; help

"Blood on the Dance Floor" is a song by American singer-songwriter Michael Jackson, released as the first single from the remix album Blood on the Dance Floor: HIStory in the Mix (1997). Jackson and Teddy Riley created the track in time for the 1991 release of Dangerous. However, it did not appear on that record and was worked on further for its commercial release in 1997. The song's bassline is interpolated from the song "Last Night a D.J. Saved My Life" by the group Indeep. The composition explores a variety of genres ranging from dance, funk to new jack swing.

The single peaked at number 42 on the US Billboard Hot 100 and reached number one in Denmark, New Zealand, Spain and the United Kingdom. It also reached the top 10 several other countries, including Australia, Finland, Germany, Netherlands, Norway and Sweden. Commentators compared "Blood on the Dance Floor" to music from Dangerous. Others commented on the song's perceived aggressive tone and the vocal style, the broad genres heard and possible lyrical interpretations of the song. Reviews at the time of release were largely mixed, but contemporary reviews have been favorable. The song was promoted with a music video that premiered on Top of the Pops. It centered on Susie seducing Jackson in a courtship "dance", before opening a switchblade. "Blood on the Dance Floor" was the only track from the remix album performed on the HIStory World Tour.

== Production and music ==
The song's backing track, composed by Teddy Riley, was originally presented to Jackson during the Dangerous recording sessions in 1990. Jackson then recorded the piece for the album in 1991, although it failed to make the final track listing. Riley was reportedly upset that Jackson did not call him to "vacuum clean this old master" upon realizing it would be included on Blood on the Dance Floor: HIStory in the Mix. Riley wanted to update the musical composition before it appeared on the remix album. In a Making Michael interview, Matt Forger mentioned that when work began on the album, they used the original Teddy Riley DAT version (which Riley played to Jackson when he came to work on Dangerous) which they took to Montreux where Jackson recorded his vocals.

Instruments played in the song include a guitar and piano, the latter of which has an F_{2}–E♭_{5} range in scientific pitch notation. Jackson's vocal range on the track is C_{3}–B♭_{5} and aspects of the song are performed in the key F minor. Genres that have been attributed to the song are dance, funk and new jack swing. Jackson incorporates many of the vocal traits associated with his work, such as hiccups and gasps. Neil Strauss of The New York Times suggests that the predatory woman in the title track, "Susie", is a metaphor for AIDS. However, in an interview with Adrian Grant, Jackson denied that the song was about AIDS.

Included throughout releases of the single are three remixes of the song "Dangerous" from Jackson's album of the same name.

== Reception ==
Professional ratings
Review scores
Source	Rating
AllMusic	3/5 stars

Larry Flick from Billboard wrote, "Produced by the artist with Teddy Riley this track chugs with a pleasant jeep-styled groove that provides a firm foundation for a lip-smacking vocal and a harmony-laden hook that is downright unshakable." He added that it is a "winning jam". The Dallas Morning News described "Blood on the Dance Floor" as an angry tale of a back-stabbing woman and Michael Saunders of The Boston Globe described it as "a middling dance-funk cut". Anthony Violenti of The Buffalo News said of the single, "[it is] laced with Teddy Riley's new jack swing sound and a pounding techno beat", whereas The Cincinnati Post characterized the song as a "lackluster first release ... dated, played-out dance track", but gave the album an overall favorable review. Jim Farber of New York Daily News, noted of the vocals and musical style, "[Jackson] coughs up a series of strangulated mutters and munchkin hiccups in lieu of a vocal, while its chilly, faux-industrial music proves as appealing as a migraine". David Sinclair from The Times constated, "With his voice little more than a whisper, and the groove screwed to a very high torque, this is as lean and urgent a piece as Jackson has ever produced."

William Ruhlman of AllMusic observed, "'Blood on the Dance Floor' is an uptempo Jackson song in the increasingly hysterical tradition of 'Billie Jean' and 'Smooth Criminal' with Jackson huffing, puffing, and yelping through some nonsense about a stabbing ... over a fairly generic electronic dance track". He was not complimentary of the B-sides that accompanied it. Stephen Thomas Erlewine, also of AllMusic, had a negative reaction to the record. He described "Blood on the Dance Floor" as a "bleak reworking of 'Jam' and 'Scream'".

Music commentator Nelson George, compared the song to material from Dangerous, such as the critically acclaimed tracks "Jam" and "Dangerous". He described it as a "pile driving" song that "explodes from radio speakers". A longtime commentator on Jackson's public life, J. Randy Taraborrelli, gave a retrospective analysis of the album in the biography, The Magic & the Madness. Taraborrelli thought that "Blood on the Dance Floor" was one of Jackson's best songs, a song that US fans "don't even know exists". In 2005, J T Griffith, of AllMusic, believed that in hindsight, "Blood on the Dance Floor" was actually a good song. He explained, "[it is] a second-rate mixture of 'Beat It' and 'Thriller' but Jackson's missteps are better than most pop music out there. This track showcases all the artist's trademarks: the ooohing, the grunts, and funky basslines. It is hard to hear 'Blood on the Dance Floor' and not want to moonwalk or dance like a ghoul".

== Promotion ==
=== Music video ===
Jackson and Azur in the music video for "Blood on the Dance Floor"

The music video for "Blood on the Dance Floor" was directed by Jackson and Vincent Paterson. Filming occurred in February 1997, when Jackson's first child Prince was born. It premiered on Top of the Pops in the UK on March 28, 1997, several weeks ahead of its release as a single. The video opens with a thrown switchblade impaling a spray painted image. The impaled image is that of a blood dripping love heart with "SUSIE + ME" scrawled across it. Jackson and a group of dancers then enter a salsa dance hall and he begins to dance with a dancing woman, "Susie" (played by Sybil Azur), while shaking maracas. Jackson then appears seated while the woman dances seductively above him on a table top.

After the first verse and chorus, there is an a cappella moment, in which Jackson breathes to the drums and the bass, then the strings, then spins, drops down and claps, then the main song starts with the second verse. This particular arrangement is only found in the video version.

Throughout the video, Jackson shows a sexual attraction towards Susie. Jackson caresses her ankle, calf, knee and thigh, and at one stage looks up her dress. The woman is then seen opening a flick knife (a nod to a scene from Jackson’s video Beat It) as the pair engage in a final courtship dance. The video closes in the same manner it began, with the switchblade impaling the spray painted image. The music video won the Brazilian TVZ Video Award: Best International Music Video of the Year. Interviewed on her experience during the video one of the dancers, Carmit Bachar (of The Pussycat Dolls) noted, "I was called in by Vincent Paterson for 'Blood on the Dance Floor'. It was to have a Latin feel, some sort of mambo. I arrived wearing a little salsa dress, fish nets, heels, and my hair was up in a kind of bun with a flower. I was 'camera ready'. I showed up with the whole outfit. It's not that producers can't see what they like, or the potential in somebody, but what I do helps them to see their vision more".

A "Refugee Camp Mix" of "Blood on the Dance Floor" appeared on Jackson's video collection, HIStory on Film, Volume II and Michael Jackson's Vision. The original song would later appear on the Number Ones DVD, which contained previously unreleased scenes. Furthermore, Paterson recorded an unreleased, alternate version of the music video, shot with an 8 mm camera. Writer David Noh, described it as, "grainy, overexposed, and sexy as shit". According to Paterson, "Michael loved it, but Sony hated it and refused to release it". The New York Times described the United States promotional effort for the Blood on the Dance Floor: HIStory in the Mix campaign as "subdued", creating "hardly a sound" and "perplexing to many people in the industry". Jackson's label Epic Records, refuted allegations they were not promoting the album sufficiently, saying, "We are completely behind the album ... Michael is certainly one of our superstars and is treated as such ... We just went into this one with our global hats on". The New York Times acknowledged that promotion was stronger internationally, where Jackson had more commercial force and popularity.

=== Performance ===
Jackson performed the song during the second leg of the HIStory World Tour in 1997. It was the only track from Blood on the Dance Floor: History in the Mix to appear on the set list.

== Chart performance ==
"Blood on the Dance Floor" became a top ten hit in almost all countries in Europe. It peaked at number one in the UK, Denmark, Spain and New Zealand, charting for 11 weeks in the latter two nations. In the UK it sold 83,767 copies in its first week, enough to take the number one spot from "I Believe I Can Fly" by Jackson collaborator R. Kelly. It was Jackson's seventh and final UK chart topper as a solo artist, although it fell to number eight in its second week of release. The European country where "Blood on the Dance Floor" had the most longevity was Switzerland, where it spent 18 weeks in the chart. The total number of sales in the UK, as of May 2016, stands at 207,700.

"Blood on the Dancefloor" peaked at number 42 on the US Billboard Hot 100. This relatively lower peak position has been attributed to the lack of US promotion and—according to J. Randy Taraborrelli and AllMusic writer William Ruhlman—the ongoing US public interest in Jackson's private life over his music.

== Track listings ==
- UK CD single
1. "Blood on the Dance Floor" – 4:14
2. "Blood on the Dance Floor" (TM's Switchblade Mix) – 8:38
3. "Blood on the Dance Floor" (Refugee Camp Mix) – 5:29
4. "Blood on the Dance Floor" (Fire Island Vocal Mix) – 8:58
5. "Blood on the Dance Floor" (Fire Island Dub) – 8:57
- US CD single
1. "Blood on the Dance Floor" – 4:13
2. "Blood on the Dance Floor" (TM's Switchblade Edit) – 3:22
3. "Blood on the Dance Floor" (Refugee Camp Edit) – 3:20
4. "Dangerous" (Roger's Dangerous Edit) – 4:41
- Europe 12-inch single
1. "Blood on the Dance Floor" (TM's O-Positive Dub) – 8:38
2. "Blood on the Dance Floor" (Fire Island Dub) – 8:55
3. "Dangerous" (Roger's Dangerous Club Mix) – 6:58
4. "Dangerous" (Roger's Rough Dub) – 6:48

== Remixes ==
Tony Moran mixes

- "Blood on the Dance Floor" (TM's Switchblade Mix) – 8:38 / 8:53*
- "Blood on the Dance Floor" (TM's Switchblade Edit) – 3:22
- "Blood on the Dance Floor" (TM's O-Positive Dub) – 8:38
- "Blood on the Dance Floor" (T&G Pool of Blood Dub) – 7:34

Fire Island mixes

- "Blood on the Dance Floor" (Fire Island Vocal Mix) – 8:55
- "Blood on the Dance Floor" (Fire Island Radio Edit) – 3:50
- "Blood on the Dance Floor" (Fire Island Dub) – 8:55

Wyclef Jean mixes

- "Blood on the Dance Floor" (Refugee Camp Mix) – 5:26
- "Blood on the Dance Floor" (Refugee Camp Edit) – 3:20
- "Blood on the Dance Floor" (Refugee Camp Dub) – 3:38

Note: There is an alternate, extended version of Tony Moran's "Switchblade Mix", available only on a singular UK 12-inch promo. The main difference in this version is the inclusion of a new lyrical section at the 2:34 point, which was omitted in the original. The last sound effect at the end of the song is also remarkably different.

== Personnel ==
- Written, composed and produced by Michael Jackson and Teddy Riley
- Solo and background vocals, vocal arrangement by Michael Jackson
- Teddy Riley and Brad Buxer: Keyboards and synthesizers, drum programming
- Guitar by Nile Rodgers
- Matt Carpenter: Digital Systems programming
- Engineered by Teddy Riley, Dave Way and Mick Guzauski
- Mixed by Mick Guzauski

== Charts ==
=== Weekly charts ===
Weekly chart performance for "Blood on the Dance Floor"
Chart (1997)	Peak position
Australia (ARIA)	5
Austria (Ö3 Austria Top 40)	9
Belgium (Ultratop 50 Flanders)	11
Belgium (Ultratop 50 Wallonia)	11
Canada (Nielsen SoundScan)	4
Canada Contemporary Hit Radio (BDS)	12
Denmark (IFPI)	1
Estonia (Eesti Top 20)	1
Europe (European Hot 100)	2
European Radio Top 50 (Music & Media)	1
Finland (Suomen virallinen lista)	2
France (SNEP)	10
French Airplay (Music & Media)	2
Germany (GfK)	5
Hungary (Mahasz)	5
Iceland (Íslenski Listinn Topp 40)	31
Ireland (IRMA)	5
Israel (Israeli Singles Chart)	4
Italy (Musica e dischi)	2
Italy Airplay (Music & Media)	1
Netherlands (Dutch Top 40)	4
Netherlands (Single Top 100)	7
New Zealand (Recorded Music NZ)	1
Norway (VG-lista)	2
Poland Airplay (Music & Media)	1
Scottish Singles Sales (Official Charts)	4
Spain (AFYVE)	1
Spain Airplay (Music & Media)	4
Sweden (Sverigetopplistan)	2
Switzerland (Schweizer Hitparade)	5
Taiwan (IFPI)	2
UK Singles (Official Charts)	1
UK Hip Hop/R&B (Official Charts)	1
US Billboard Hot 100	42
US Dance Singles Sales (Billboard)	2
US Dance Club Songs (Billboard)	10
US Hot R&B/Hip-Hop Songs (Billboard)	19
US Pop Airplay (Billboard)	38
US Rhythmic Airplay (Billboard)	24

2006 weekly chart performance for "Blood on the Dance Floor"
Chart (2006)	Peak position
Ireland (IRMA)	19
Italy (FIMI)	10
Italy (Musica e dischi)	42
Netherlands (Single Top 100)	60
Scottish Singles Sales (Official Charts)	16
Spain (Promusicae)	1
Switzerland (Schweizer Hitparade)	38
UK Singles (Official Charts)	19

=== Year-end charts ===
Year-end chart performance for "Blood on the Dance Floor"
Chart (1997)	Position
Australia (ARIA)	76
Belgium (Ultratop 50 Flanders)	75
Belgium (Ultratop 50 Wallonia)	68
Europe (Eurochart Hot 100)	53
Germany (Media Control)	92
Netherlands (Dutch Top 40)	96
New Zealand (RIANZ)	33
Romania (Romanian Top 100)	12
Sweden (Topplistan)	97
Switzerland (Schweizer Hitparade)	41
UK Singles (OCC)	69

== Certifications ==
Certifications and sales for "Blood on the Dance Floor"
Region	Certification	Certified units/sales
Australia (ARIA)	Gold	35,000^{^}
Belgium (BRMA)	Platinum	50,000^{*}
Germany (BVMI)	Gold	250,000^{^}
New Zealand (RMNZ)	Gold	5,000^{*}
United Kingdom (BPI)	Silver	200,000^{‡}
^{*} Sales figures based on certification alone.^{^} Shipments figures based on certification alone.^{‡} Sales+streaming figures based on certification alone.

== See also ==
- "Blood on the Dance Floor x Dangerous", a 2017 mashup

== Bibliography ==
- George, Nelson (2004). Michael Jackson: The Ultimate Collection booklet. Sony BMG.
- Taraborrelli, J. Randy (2004). The Magic and the Madness. Terra Alta, WV: Headline. ISBN 0-330-42005-4.
