= Stranger in Moscow =

1996 single by Michael Jackson

Single by Michael Jackson

from the album HIStory: Past, Present and Future, Book I
- B-side: "Off the Wall" (Junior Vasquez mix)
- Written: September 1993
- Released: September 5, 1996
- Recorded: January 1994
- Studio: The Hit Factory (New York City); Sony Music (New York City)
- Genre: R&B
- Length: 5:44 (album version); 5:24 (album edit); 4:05 (radio edit); 5:32 (video mix)
- Label: Epic
- Songwriter: Michael Jackson
- Producer: Michael Jackson

Michael Jackson singles chronology
"They Don't Care About Us" (1996)	"Stranger in Moscow" (1996)	"On the Line" (1997)

Music video
- "Stranger in Moscow" on YouTube

Audio sample
- "Stranger in Moscow": file; help

"Stranger in Moscow" is a song by American singer and songwriter Michael Jackson from his ninth studio album, HIStory: Past, Present and Future, Book I (1995). The song was released as the fifth and final single in Europe in September 1996 by Epic Records, with a UK-release on November 4, 1996. It was released in the United States on July 7, 1997.

The song's music video, directed by Nick Brandt, depicts the lives of six individuals, including Jackson, who are left isolated and disconnected from the world around them. "Stranger in Moscow" charted highly in the top 10 of numerous countries music charts worldwide, including Austria, the Czech Republic, Denmark, Hungary, Italy, New Zealand, Spain, Sweden, and the United Kingdom. However, it only peaked at number 91 on the Billboard Hot 100, becoming Jackson's lowest-peaking song on the chart. The song was performed on the HIStory World Tour in 1996–1997. It has been covered by other artists.

== Background ==
"Stranger in Moscow", like several other HIStory tracks, was Jackson's response to recent events in his personal life. In 1993, the relationship between Jackson and the press soured entirely when he was accused of child sexual abuse. Though not charged with a crime, Jackson was intensely scrutinized by the media during the criminal investigation. Complaints about the media coverage included accepting stories of Jackson's alleged criminal activity and leaked police material in exchange for money, using unflattering pictures of Jackson; and using headlines that strongly implied Jackson's guilt.

The coverage upset Jackson, and damaged his health; Jackson's health had deteriorated such that he canceled the remainder of his Dangerous World Tour and went into rehabilitation. The media showed him little sympathy. The Daily Mirror held a "Spot the Jacko" contest, offering readers a trip to Walt Disney World if they could correctly predict where the entertainer's next appearance would be. A Daily Express headline read, "Drug Treatment Star Faces Life on the Run", while a News of the World headline accused Jackson of being a fugitive. These tabloids also falsely alleged that Jackson had traveled to Europe to have cosmetic surgery that would make him unrecognizable upon return. Geraldo Rivera set up a mock trial, with a jury made up of audience members, even though Jackson had not been charged with a crime.

== Music ==
"Stranger in Moscow" is an R&B ballad with a tempo of 65 beats per minute, making it one of Jackson's slowest songs. Guitars were played by Steve Lukather while keyboards, synthesizers and bass are credited to David Paich and Steve Porcaro.

Jackson used Russian imagery and symbolism to underscore the track's sense of fear and alienation. Some editions were labelled as Чужестранец в Москве. It concludes with a narrative, spoken in Russian, by a KGB interrogator (Ed Wiesnieski). The narrative, translated into English is, "Why have you come from the west? Confess! To steal the great achievements of the people, the accomplishments of the workers..."

== Writing ==
"Stranger in Moscow" was written in September 1993 in Moscow, during the Dangerous World Tour. It is based on the credits theme of the 1994 video game Sonic the Hedgehog 3, for which Jackson and his tour keyboardist Brad Buxer were hired to compose. According to Buxer, Jackson called him to his hotel room in Moscow. Thinking he wanted to hear his new game cues, Buxer played several songs on the piano in the room, including the Sonic the Hedgehog 3 credits theme. He and Jackson developed the rest of the song over an hour and a half. Conflicting accounts state that Jackson either left the Sonic the Hedgehog 3 project following the sexual abuse allegations around this time or went uncredited because of his dissatisfaction with the limitations of the Sega Genesis sound chip.

== Recording ==
"Stranger in Moscow" was recorded for inclusion on the double album HIStory: Past, Present and Future, Book I, released in 1995. Sessions took place at the Hit Factory and Sony Music Studios in New York City in early 1994. Originally, HIStory was envisioned as a greatest hits album with only a handful of new tracks. However, Jackson and his collaborators were so pleased with the result of the sessions that they decided to give HIStory a full studio album treatment, resulting in a second disc featuring fourteen new tracks.

== Critical reception ==
"Stranger in Moscow" received praise from music critics and producers. Stephen Thomas Erlewine of AllMusic noted of HIStory, "Jackson produces some well-crafted pop that ranks with his best material... 'Stranger in Moscow' is one of his most haunting ballads". Tom Molley of the Associated Press described it as an "ethereal and stirring description of a man wounded by a 'swift and sudden fall from grace' walking in the shadow of the Kremlin". Longtime collaborator Bruce Swedien, has described "Stranger in Moscow" as one of the best songs Jackson had ever done. Fred Shuster of the Daily News of Los Angeles described it as, "a lush, pretty minor-key ballad with one of the album's catchiest choruses". Chris Willman of Los Angeles Times stated:

"Stranger in Moscow" is a step removed from the focused paranoia of much of the rest of the album, more akin to the deeper, fuzzier dread of a past perennial like "Billie Jean". Jackson imagines himself alone and adrift in a psychic Russia, pre-glasnost, hunted by an unseen KGB: "Here abandoned in my fame / Armageddon of the brain", he sings in the somber, constricted verses, before a sweeping coda kicks up four minutes in and the stalkee suddenly breaks his cool to wail about a desolate, inconsolable loneliness. Here, in this song, is the real genius—and probably real personhood—of Michael Jackson.

A reviewer from Music Week rated it five out of five, picking it as Single of the Week. The reviewer added, "More melodic than most of HIStory's new, uptempo tracks, this has a somewhat old-fashioned feel, being closer in spirit to 'Rock with You' than 'Scream'. It isn't quite vintage Jacko, but the song is irresistible." The magazine's Alan Jones stated that the Todd Terry remix "works like a dream, and guarantees Jackson another substantial hit." Jon Pareles of The New York Times stated, "The ballads are lavishly melodic. 'Stranger in Moscow', with odd lyrics like 'Stalin's tomb won't let me be,' has a beautiful chorus for the repeated question 'How does it feel?'". Further praise came in 2005 when it was felt that the song had successfully portrayed "eerie loneliness" and was characterized as beautiful by Josephine Zohny of PopMatters. James Hunter of Rolling Stone commented:

[Jackson is] angry, miserable, tortured, inflammatory, furious about what he calls, in "Stranger in Moscow", a "swift and sudden fall from grace"...HIStory feels like the work of someone with a bad case of Thriller nostalgia. Occasionally this backward focus works to Jackson's advantage: On "Stranger in Moscow" he remembers the synth-pop '80s while constructing wracked claims of danger and loneliness that rival any Seattle rocker's pain.

Patrick Macdonald of The Seattle Times described "Stranger in Moscow" as "a pretty ballad interspersed with sounds of rain." David Sinclair from The Times viewed it as "a dolorous ballad".

== Music video ==
Michael Jackson walking the streets of the city in the music video

The song's accompanying music video was shot in July 1996. It was directed by photographer Nick Brandt, and filmed in Los Angeles, is focused around six unrelated people living in isolation in a cityscape on a dark, cloudy day while the rest of the world moves around them in slow motion. The first half of the video introduces these figures. Five of the figures are: a bald man looking down at the city from his apartment window, a woman sitting alone in a coffee shop, a homeless man lying on the damp street, a well-dressed man feeding pigeons, and a teenage boy watching a street game of baseball. The sixth figure is Jackson himself, seen walking the city streets while he sings. Special effects are used to show birds and wasps flying, glass breaking and coffee spilling, all in slow motion.

In the second half of the scenario, heavy rain descends on the city and the citizens try to flee, all again seen in slow motion. From the safety of shelter, the six "strangers" watch everyone's futile attempts to avoid the sudden change in weather. Eventually, they decide to go outside, where they look up at the sky and allow the rain to soak them. The video ends with Michael whipping his hair. During this scene, a soft Russian voice is heard, a reference to Moscow.

The music video also appears on Jackson's video albums HIStory on Film, Volume II and Michael Jackson's Vision. It was published on YouTube in October 2009. The video has amassed more than 102 million views as of August 2026.

Jackson's biographer J. Randy Taraborrelli has stated that the video is based on Jackson's real life. He used to walk alone at night looking for new friends, even at the peak of his musical popularity. The 1980s saw him become deeply unhappy; Jackson, as a teenager, explained in an interview, "Even at home, I'm lonely. I sit in my room sometimes and cry. It's so hard to make friends... I sometimes walk around the neighborhood at night, just hoping to find someone to talk to. But I just end up coming home."

== Live performances ==
The song was performed during the HIStory World Tour (1996–1997).

== Track listing ==
- UK CD single (6633525)
  1. "Stranger in Moscow" (Album Version) – 5.43
  2. "Stranger in Moscow" (Tee's Radio Mix) – 4.21
  3. "Stranger in Moscow" (Tee's In-House Club Mix) – 6.53
  4. "Stranger in Moscow" (TNT Frozen Sun Mix—Club) – 6.49
  5. "Stranger in Moscow" (Tee's Freeze Radio) – 3.45
  6. "Stranger in Moscow" (TNT Danger Dub) – 7.21
  7. "Stranger in Moscow" (Tee's Light AC Mix) – 4.24
- US 12-inch single
  1. "Stranger in Moscow" (Hani's Num Club Mix) – 10:15
  2. "Stranger in Moscow" (TNT Danger Dub) – 7:21
  3. "Stranger in Moscow" (Basement Boys 12" Club Mix) – 8:18
  4. "Blood on the Dancefloor" (T&G Pool of Blood Dub) – 7:34
- US CD single
  1. "Stranger in Moscow" (Tee's Radio Mix) – 4:21
  2. "Stranger in Moscow" (Charles Roane's Full R&B Mix) – 4:40
  3. "Stranger in Moscow" (Hani's Num Radio Mix) – 3:50
  4. "Stranger in Moscow" (Tee's In-House Club Mix) – 6:54
  5. "Stranger in Moscow" (Basement Boys 12" Club Mix) – 8:18
  6. "Stranger in Moscow" (Hani's Extended Chill Hop Mix) – 6:01
  7. "Off the Wall" (Junior Vasquez Remix) – 5:14

== Personnel ==
As per the liner notes of The Ultimate Collection:

- Lead and background vocals by Michael Jackson
- Guitar: Steve Lukather
- Keyboards, synthesizers & [synth] bass: David Paich
- Keyboards & synthesizers: Steve Porcaro
- Keyboards & synthesizers, programming (uncredited): Brad Buxer
- Michael Jackson beatbox samples in intro spliced/edited by Andrew Scheps

== Charts ==
"Stranger in Moscow" performed far better Internationally than the United States, only spending two weeks on the US Billboard Hot 100. Its debut position of number 91 on August 23, 1997, was its peak. In Europe, the song was a top-ten hit on several sales charts, being number-one in Italy, Spain, and the Czech Republic, and topped many of those monitoring airplay, including a pan-European chart for songs by non-European artists. In the United Kingdom, it reached number four on both the Airplay chart and sales-only UK Singles Chart, and was the most-played pop/dance song of 1996 at clubs according to Music Week. It was eventually certified Silver by the British Phonographic Industry for sales of 200,000 units.

=== Weekly charts ===
Weekly chart performance
Chart (1996–1997)	Peak position
Australia (ARIA)	14
Austria (Ö3 Austria Top 40)	7
Belgium (Ultratop 50 Flanders)	26
Belgium (Ultratop 50 Wallonia)	21
Czech Republic (IFPI CR)	1
Denmark (IFPI)	8
Estonia (Eesti Top 20)	12
Europe (Eurochart Hot 100)	6
Europe Atlantic Crossovers (Music & Media)	1
Finland (Suomen virallinen lista)	14
France (SNEP)	18
France Airplay (Music & Media)	2
Germany (GfK)	21
Hungary (Mahasz)	6
Iceland (Íslenski Listinn Topp 40)	24
Ireland (IRMA)	13
Israel (Israeli Singles Chart)	8
Italy (Musica e dischi)	1
Italy Airplay (Music & Media)	1
Netherlands (Dutch Top 40)	9
Netherlands (Single Top 100)	6
New Zealand (Recorded Music NZ)	6
Poland Airplay (Music & Media)	12
Scottish Singles Sales (Official Charts)	7
Spain (AFYVE)	1
Spain Airplay (Music & Media)	8
Sweden (Sverigetopplistan)	21
Switzerland (Schweizer Hitparade)	5
Taiwan (IFPI)	5
UK Singles (Official Charts)	4
UK Airplay (Music Week)	4
UK Pop Tip Club Chart (Music Week)	1
US Billboard Hot 100	91
US Hot R&B/Hip-Hop Songs (Billboard)	50

=== Year-end charts ===
Year-end chart performance
Chart (1996)	Position
Europe (Eurochart Hot 100)	58
Europe Airplay (European Hit Radio)	36
Europe Atlantic Crossovers (Music & Media)	18
Netherlands (Dutch Top 40)	91
Netherlands (Single Top 100)	87
UK Singles (OCC)	90
UK Pop Tip Club Chart (Music Week)	1

== Certifications ==
Certifications and sales
Region	Certification	Certified units/sales
United Kingdom (BPI)	Silver	200,000^{‡}
^{‡} Sales+streaming figures based on certification alone.

== Cover versions ==
- British singer Leona Lewis did a live rendition at the Michael Forever – The Tribute Concert.
- Kevin Parker released a cover by his Australian psychedelic rock music project Tame Impala on SoundCloud on March 12, 2014.
- The American rock band Santana have covered the song in their concerts and the cover was uploaded on YouTube on March 30, 2020.
- The Struts covered the song for their unplugged EP Unplugged at EastWest.

== Bibliography ==
- Campbell, Lisa (1995). Michael Jackson: The King of Pops Darkest Hour. Branden. ISBN 0-8283-2003-9.
- George, Nelson (2004). Michael Jackson: The Ultimate Collection. Sony BMG.
- Pinkerton, Lee (1998). The Many Faces of Michael Jackson. Music Sales Distribution. ISBN 0-7119-6783-0.
- Taraborrelli, J. Randy (2004). The Magic and the Madness. Terra Alta, WV: Headline. ISBN 0-330-42005-4.
