= Hold My Hand (Michael Jackson and Akon song) =

Single by Michael Jackson and Akon

from the album Michael
- Released: November 15, 2010
- Recorded: December 2007 (basic tracks); 2010 (additional overdubs and mixing)
- Studio: Studio at the Palms (Las Vegas); Solitaire (Atlanta); Metropolis (London); Wisseloord (Hilversum); FC Walvisch (Amsterdam)
- Genre: R&B; gospel
- Length: 3:32
- Label: Epic
- Songwriters: Aliaune Thiam; Giorgio Tuinfort; Claude Kelly
- Producers: Akon; Giorgio Tuinfort; Michael Jackson (co-producer)

Michael Jackson singles chronology
"Mind Is the Magic" (2010)	"Hold My Hand" (2010)	"Hollywood Tonight" (2011)

Akon singles chronology
"Move That Body" (2010)	"Hold My Hand" (2010)	"Kush" (2010)

Music video
- "Hold My Hand" on YouTube

Audio sample
- "Hold My Hand": file; help

"Hold My Hand" is a duet performed by American singer-songwriters Michael Jackson and Akon, from Jackson's first posthumous album Michael (2010). The song was originally recorded by Akon and Jackson in December 2007. The song was an international top 10 hit in nations such as Austria, Belgium, Denmark, Germany, Hungary, Italy, New Zealand, Norway, Poland, Spain, Sweden, Switzerland and the United Kingdom.

== Background ==
Co-writer Claude Kelly told HitQuarters that "Hold My Hand" was originally written with Whitney Houston in mind. Akon and Kelly had been in the studio working on songs for Houston's I Look to You album and while on his own Kelly completed the song from a track Akon had left. After hearing the song later, Akon said that he loved it and wanted to keep it for himself, so he wanted to record his own version of it. Shortly afterwards Akon went to Las Vegas to work on what would have been Michael Jackson's next album. While there, Jackson heard the song and loved it, and decided he wanted to contribute to it. When Kelly was asked what he thought it was about the song that struck a chord with both Akon and Jackson, he said that it was the song's theme of friendship and togetherness. "Hold My Hand" was recorded by Jackson and Akon in late December 2007 at the Studio at the Palms Casino Resort in Las Vegas, Nevada. Akon finished the rest of his vocals for the song in 2010, a few days before the release. A handwritten note from Jackson belonging to his estate indicated his desire that "Hold My Hand" be the first single on his next project. However, in its unfinished state, the song leaked out on June 30, 2008. This would be the last new song leaked during Jackson's lifetime. Due to the leak, the song was subsequently pulled from Akon's track listing for his 2008 album, Freedom. Akon regretted the decision after Jackson died the next year and decided to finish the song in his honor.

Akon commented, "The world was not ready to hear 'Hold My Hand' when it leaked a couple years ago. We were devastated about it. But its time has definitely come; now in its final state, it has become an incredible, beautiful, anthemic song. I'm so proud to have had the chance to work with Michael, one of my all time idols." Before the official release of the song, Akon stated on Twitter that the final version would have more of Jackson's vocals. The song was released globally on Monday, November 15, 2010, at 12:01am EST. It was available to stream from Jackson's official website. Jackson's nephew, Taj Jackson, posted a message saying that his uncle was proud of the song. "I'll never forget that smile he had on his face as the song played through the speakers [in his room] at the Palms Hotel in Vegas." The song is the second collaboration between the two artists and the second consecutive duet single release for Jackson, following "Wanna Be Startin' Somethin' 2008". That song proved a commercial success and charted within the top 20 in several countries.

== Music video ==
On Monday, November 22, 2010, the filming for the official video began in Tustin, California, a main filming location being the airship hangars at Marine Corps Air Station Tustin. There was a casting call posted up on Jackson's official website, saying that they were "looking for his fans of all ages who want to be a part of this iconic event." On December 4, 2010, a 30-second teaser of the video was released on Michael Jackson's official YouTube channel and the official website. It featured clips from Jackson's Live in Bucharest: The Dangerous Tour DVD and clips of fans dancing. The video debuted at midnight December 9, 2010 on worldwide websites, including MichaelJackson.com. The video showed Jackson in concert (from Dangerous World Tour in Bucharest and HIStory World Tour in Munich), Akon singing and children dancing in the dress of Jackson, as well as sentimental scenes of children, families, and elderly people holding hands and a woman weeping. The video was directed by Mark Pellington.

== Critical reception ==
The song received mostly positive reviews in contrast to the negative reviews of the previous promotional single "Breaking News". Ashante Infantry, entertainment reporter for the Toronto Star, called it a "catchy, well-meaning addition to Jackson's catalog." She also wrote, "Buoyed by strings and a backing chorus, the singer applies his angelic tenor to soaring phrasing that models the uplifting purport of the tune’s love and unity lyrics in the spirit of 1995's "You Are Not Alone", Jackson's last No. 1 hit." Huffington Post commentator Joe Vogel praised it as "a simple, but powerful song that embodies so much of what fans loved about Michael Jackson. Like U2's 'One' it is a 'love song' that expands outward making the personal something more profound and universal", and added that "With its catchy chorus and majestic crescendo it has all the makings of a big hit." Vogel also noted the first line of the song, "This life don't last forever", was a "poignant reminder of the transience of life". MTV's Gil Kaufman stated that "the uplifting 'Hold My Hand' is one of Jackson's classic love ballads, a heart-stirring call to unity," and that it ended with "a majestic feel." Newsday music critic Glenn Gamboa said that the tune "finds Jackson in fine voice". He also remarked, "Now this is more like it." Gerrick D. Kennedy of the Los Angeles Times music blog wrote that the "mid-tempo uplifting track is classic M.J."

Negative reviews however came from Yahoo! Music, where commentator Chris Willman argued that the single stole elements from the Hootie & the Blowfish song of the same name, and Minneapolis City Pages where commentator Ray Cummings said "there's no way to reasonably avoid being disappointed and dispirited by its thinness." Michael Roffman from Consequence of Sound called the track "highly irritating" and "incredibly repetitive", where "Akon belts out the same thing again and again in an equally monotonous pitch", adding that "as a lead single it was tepid and incredibly campy." Boston Herald critic Jed Gottlieb described the song as "an average, Auto-Tuned Akon croon" without "the snap, crackle and pop of a finished King of Pop product." Gottlieb also wrote, "Jackson is grumbling from his grave." Jason Lipshutz from Billboard said it "isn't a classic Jackson single", but that Jackson's "diehards should delight in hearing a stylish pop production that doesn't dwell on the singer's troubled life."

== Commercial performance ==
The song debuted at number 53 on the Hot R&B/Hip-Hop Songs chart the week of November 27, 2010. It also became Michael Jackson's 48th hit on Billboard Hot 100, and debuted at number 84. It debuted on the Adult R&B chart at number 16 as the chart's highest start in 2010 the same week. The song is Jackson's first top 40 hit on the Billboard Hot 100 since 2002's "Butterflies". The song debuted at number 24 on the Billboard Jazz Songs Chart on the week of January 15, 2011, as Jackson's first single on this chart, it peaked at number 16. According to SoundScan, the song has sold 304,000 copies by the middle of January 2011.

== Track listing ==
All tracks written by Akon, Giorgio Tuinfort, and Claude Kelly; produced by Akon and Tuinfort, with co-production by Jackson.

European CD single
No.	Title	Length
1.	"Hold My Hand"	3:32
2.	"Hold My Hand" (vocals & orchestra)	3:44
3.	"Hold My Hand" (alternative mix)	3:48
4.	"Hold My Hand" (instrumental)	3:32
Total length:		13:56

== Personnel ==
Credits lifted from the liner notes of Michael.

Technical

- Kory Aaron – vocal recording
- Eelco Bakker – vocal recording
- Serban Ghenea – mixing engineer
- Franck van der Heijden – arranger
- Michael Jackson – co-producer
- Claude Kelly – writer
- Wessel Oltheten – mixing engineer, recording engineer
- Matt Paul – vocal recording
- Justin Pintar – vocal recording
- Miguel Scott – vocal recording
- Akon – finisher, producer, programming, writer
- Giorgio Tuinfort – finisher, producer, programming, writer
- Ryan Wiese – vocal recording
- Mack Woodward – vocal recording

Performers and musicians

- Dennis Krijnen – orechestra
- Arlia de Ruiter – violin
- Pauline Terlouw – violin
- Erica Korthals-Altes – violin
- Vera Laporeva – violin
- Sarah Koch – violin
- Linda Dumessie – violin
- Dennis Koenders – violin
- Seija Teeuwen – violin
- David Peijnenborgh – violin
- Wim Kok – violin
- Elizabeth Liefkes Cats – violin
- Feyona van Iersel – violin
- Vera van der Brie – violin
- Erik Jan Kromhout – violin
- Giorgio Tuinfort – grand piano
- Mieke Honingh – alt violin
- Isabella Petersen – alt violin
- Iris Schut – alt violin
- Rani Kumar – alt violin
- Arjen de Graaf – alt violin
- Emile Visser – celli
- Maarten Jansen – celli
- Michiel Weidner – celli
- Jascha Albracht – celli
- Erik Winkelman – contrabass
- Pierre Buizer – horns
- Iris Oltheten – horns
- Alan Austin – choir
- Anthony Brice – choir
- Antoria Caston – choir
- Richard Dale – choir
- Eric Echols – choir
- Charlene Gillead – choir
- Valencia Green – choir
- Cynthia Jones – choir
- Iris McGhee – choir
- Felicia Peavy – choir
- Michelle Roberts – choir
- Gina Taylor – choir
- Dana Widener – choir
- Terance Wilson – choir
- Sandra Wright – choir
- Leo Wheat, Jr. – choir

== Charts ==
=== Weekly charts ===
Weekly chart performance
Chart (2010–2011)	Peak position
Australia (ARIA)	37
Austria (Ö3 Austria Top 40)	9
Belgium (Ultratop 50 Flanders)	10
Belgium (Ultratop 50 Wallonia)	8
Canada (Canadian Hot 100)	16
CIS Airplay (TopHit)	180
Czech Republic Airplay (ČNS IFPI)	13
Denmark (Tracklisten)	3
Finland (Suomen virallinen lista)	16
France (SNEP)	27
Germany (GfK)	7
Germany (Airplay Chart)	1
Hungary (Rádiós Top 40)	3
Hungary (Single Top 40)	10
Ireland (IRMA)	21
Italy (FIMI)	4
Italy Airplay (EarOne)	3
Japan (Japan Hot 100)	13
Netherlands (Dutch Top 40)	28
Netherlands (Single Top 100)	27
New Zealand (Recorded Music NZ)	6
Norway (VG-lista)	9
Polish Dance Chart (ZPAV)	40
Russia Airplay (TopHit)	185
Scottish Singles Sales (Official Charts)	17
Spain (Promusicae)	7
Spain (Airplay Chart)	1
Sweden (Sverigetopplistan)	8
Switzerland (Schweizer Hitparade)	9
UK Hip Hop/R&B (Official Charts)	3
UK Singles (Official Charts)	10
US Billboard Hot 100	39
US Hot R&B/Hip-Hop Songs (Billboard)	33
US Pop Airplay (Billboard)	38
US Smooth Jazz Airplay (Billboard)	16

=== Year-end charts ===
Annual chart rankings
Chart (2010)	Position
Germany (Official German Charts)	91
Netherlands (Dutch Top 40)	240
Sweden (Sverigetopplistan)	72
UK Singles (OCC)	168

Chart (2011)	Position
Hungary (Single Top 40)	28
Italy (Musica e dischi)	60
Netherlands (Dutch Top 40)	183
Spain (PROMUSICAE)	35

== Certifications ==
Region	Certification	Certified units/sales
Canada (Music Canada)	Platinum	80,000^{‡}
Denmark (IFPI Danmark)	Gold	45,000^{‡}
Germany (BVMI)	Gold	150,000^{‡}
Italy (FIMI)	Gold	15,000^{*}
New Zealand (RMNZ)	Gold	7,500^{*}
Spain (Promusicae)	Gold	20,000^{*}
Sweden (GLF)	Platinum	40,000^{‡}
United Kingdom (BPI)	Silver	200,000^{‡}
United States (RIAA)	Gold	500,000^{‡}
^{*} Sales figures based on certification alone.^{‡} Sales+streaming figures based on certification alone.

== Release history ==
Release dates and formats for "Hold My Hand"
Region	Date	Format(s)	Label(s)	Ref.
France	November 15, 2010	Digital download	Sony Music	
New Zealand	November 15, 2010	Digital download	Sony Music	
Australia	November 15, 2010	Digital download	Sony Music	
Belgium	November 15, 2010	Digital download	Sony Music	
Sweden	November 15, 2010	Digital download	Sony Music	
Germany	November 15, 2010	Digital download	Sony Music	
Denmark	November 15, 2010	Digital download	Sony Music	
Spain	November 15, 2010	Digital download	Sony Music	
China	November 17, 2010	Digital download	Sony Music	
Poland	November 18, 2010	Digital download	Sony Music	
United States	November 18, 2010	Digital download	Epic	
United States	November 23, 2010	Contemporary hit radio	Epic	
United States	November 23, 2010	Rhythmic contemporary radio	Epic	
Austria	December 3, 2010	CD single	Sony Music	
Germany	December 3, 2010	CD single	Sony Music	
United Kingdom	December 5, 2010	Digital download	Epic	
United Kingdom	December 6, 2010	CD single	Epic	
France	December 6, 2010	CD single	Sony Music	

== See also ==
- List of unreleased songs recorded by Michael Jackson
- Death of Michael Jackson
- List of music released posthumously
