= Reissue =

Repeated issue of sound recordings

In the music industry, a reissue (also re-release, repackage or re-edition) is a release of an album or single which has been released at least once before, sometimes with alterations or additions.

== Reasons for reissue ==
=== New audio formats ===
Recordings originally released in an audio format that has become technologically or commercially obsolete are reissued in new formats. For example, thousands of original vinyl albums have been reissued on CDs since introduction of that format in the early 1980s. With the introduction of the LP record in 1948, some collections of 78 rpm records were reissued on LP. More recently, many albums originally released on CD or earlier formats have been reissued on SACD, DVD-Audio, digital music downloads, and on music streaming services.

=== Budget records ===
Beginning with Pickwick Records, which acquired the rights to reissue many of Capitol Records' non-current albums at a low price in venues other than record stores, several record companies started "budget" or "drugstore records" subsidiaries to sell their deleted items at lower prices.

=== New territory ===
This could be where a self-released work in one territory signs a proper record deal in a new territory. For example, an act in North America who self-release an album may re-release it via an official label in Europe a couple of years later.

=== New ownership ===
When one record label buys out another record label or acquires an individual recording artist's back catalogue, their albums are often reissued on the purchasing label. For example, Polydor Records reissued many of James Brown's albums which were originally released on his former label, King Records. King Records had itself previously reissued albums and singles by Brown that were originally recorded for its subsidiary label, Federal Records.

=== Strong or weak sales ===
Recordings are reissued to meet continuing demand for an album that continues to be popular after its original release. In other cases, albums are reissued to create interest in and hopefully revive the sales of a release which has sold poorly. For example, the heavy metal label Roadrunner Records is notorious for reissuing their artist's works' only months after releasing the original album. According to US music magazine Billboard, reissues target "casual consumers who hadn't picked up the album when it was originally released, as well as obsessives who need to own every song in an artist's catalog."

In the late 2000s to early 2010s, reissues of studio albums with expanded track listings were common, with the new music often being released as stand-alone EPs. In October 2010, a Vanity Fair article regarding the trend noted reissues and post-album EPs as "the next step in extending albums' shelf lives, following the "deluxe" editions that populated stores during the past few holiday seasons—add a few tracks to the back end of an album and release one of them to radio, slap on a new coat of paint, and—voila!—a stocking stuffer is born." Examples of such releases include Lady Gaga's The Fame Monster (2009) following her debut album The Fame (2008), Kesha's Cannibal (2010) following her debut album Animal (2010) and Katy Perry's Teenage Dream: The Complete Confection (2012), following her third album Teenage Dream (2010). A recent example is Ariana Grande's Eternal Sunshine Deluxe: Brighter Days Ahead (2025), a reissue of Eternal Sunshine (2024).

=== Special, limited and commemorative editions ===
Some recordings are reissued to celebrate their popularity, influence, or an anniversary of the artist or the recording.

=== Track controversy and revisionism ===
Some recordings are reissued soon after their original release because one of the tracks was seen in a negative light. "Cop Killer" by Body Count was one such example.

Some recordings are remixed and reissued to erase prior band member's contributions. Two such examples were Ozzy Osbourne's albums Blizzard of Ozz (1980) and Diary of a Madman (1981). Bassist Bob Daisley and drummer Lee Kerslake successfully sued Osbourne and his wife/manager Sharon in court, winning songwriting credits and royalties for their contributions. In 2002, Osbourne replaced their parts with rerecordings by Robert Trujillo and Mike Bordin, although the original parts were restored for the 30th anniversary editions in 2011. British girl group Sugababes reissued their studio album Taller in More Ways following Mutya Buena's replacement with Amelle Berrabah. "Do What U Want" by Lady Gaga featuring R. Kelly was removed from all streaming and online versions and new vinyl and CD pressings of Gaga's third studio album Artpop in light of the documentary Surviving R. Kelly.

Some recordings are reissued when one or more songs come into question. A notable example is Michael Jackson's posthumous album Michael, which had three songs ("Keep Your Head Up", "Monster" and "Breaking News") removed in later releases due to controversy concerning the authenticity of Jackson's vocals.

=== Sequel ===
Some reissued albums were released for making sequel of the promotion project. This is different to special or limited album, where both special and limited album were released for certain event like Christmas or group's anniversary. An example is Funky Town by T-ara, where this repackage album was released as the sequel of their previous EP, Black Eyes. The album was released for their drama video project where the video was released as the sequel of their previous drama video, Cry Cry from the previous EP. Another example is Twicecoaster: Lane 2 by Twice. The repackage album is the sequel of their previous EP, Twicecoaster: Lane 1.

== Alterations ==
Common additions to reissued albums include:

- Audio remastering or remixing
- Inclusion of bonus tracks or multimedia content
- New liner notes
- New album art or packaging
- Modifiers in the title such as "Special Edition" or "Expanded Version"

== Reissues and certification ==
For the purposes of quantifying sales, an album's original and subsequent releases are counted together. For example, if an album sold 300,000 of its original release and 700,000 in reissues, it would be entitled to platinum certification. However, the musical contents of the original disc must remain the same on a reissue for it to count towards certification.

== Reissue labels ==
Some record labels specialize in reissuing recordings originally released on other labels. Four of the biggest reissue labels are Rhino Records, Craft Recordings, Hip-O Records, and Legacy Recordings. Each of these companies reissues material from the labels of a major music conglomerate: Warner Music Group, Concord, Universal Music Group, and Sony Music Entertainment, respectively. Collectables Records is another prolific reissue label that licenses recordings from other labels.
