= Michael Jackson: The Experience =

2010 video game

- PAL cover art
- Developers: Triumph International, Inc. Ubisoft Montpellier, Ubisoft Milan, Ubisoft Paris (Wii, PlayStation 3); Ubisoft Montreal (Xbox 360); Ubisoft Sao Paulo (Nintendo DS and PlayStation Portable); Ubisoft Shanghai (Nintendo 3DS, PlayStation Vita, and iOS)
- Publisher: Ubisoft
- Platforms: Nintendo DS; PlayStation Portable; Wii; PlayStation 3 Xbox 360; Nintendo 3DS iOS; PlayStation Vita
- Release: November 23, 2010: Nintendo DS, PlayStation Portable, Wii; NA: 23 November 2010; AU: 25 November 2010; EU: 26 November 2010; JP: 8 December 2011 PlayStation 3 & Xbox 360; NA: 12 April 2011; AU: 14 April 2011; EU: 15 April 2011; JP: 8 December 2011 Nintendo 3DS; NA: 7 November 2011; EU: 11 November 2011 iOS; NA: 7 December 2011 PlayStation Vita; NA: 15 February 2012; EU: 22 February 2012; AU: 23 February 2012
- Genres: Music, rhythm
- Modes: Single-player, multiplayer

Michael Jackson: The Experience is a music video game based on Michael Jackson's songs. It was developed and published by Ubisoft, and was released for the Nintendo DS, PlayStation Portable, and Wii in November 2010, for the PlayStation 3's PlayStation Move and the Xbox 360's Kinect in April 2011, for the Nintendo 3DS in November 2011, for iOS devices exclusively in North America on 7 December 2011, and for PlayStation Vita in February 2012. The Japanese release on 8 December 2011 only revised the PlayStation 3, Xbox 360, and Wii consoles.

The game features many of Jackson's hits, such as "Bad", "Thriller", "Beat It", "Billie Jean", "Smooth Criminal", "Black or White", "The Way You Make Me Feel", etc. However, some songs like "Man in the Mirror" and "P.Y.T. (Pretty Young Thing)" are excluded, and there are no songs from the Motown era. Initial launches of the game included a limited edition replica of Jackson's sequined glove.

The Wii version sold 2 million copies in two months, not including Japanese sales, making it one of the best-selling Wii title games.

== Gameplay ==
=== Wii ===
The Wii version of the game features Just Dance-style gameplay, thus serving as a spin-off title. There are three modes of gameplay in this version. The first mode of gameplay is "Classic" where all players follow Jackson's choreographed routine on-screen. The second mode of gameplay is "Duo" which is used for duets (e.g., "The Girl Is Mine") or videos with two main characters (e.g., "The Way You Make Me Feel" and "In the Closet"). The player(s) can choose to follow Jackson or the other character. The third mode of gameplay is "Crew", which features Jackson and two backup dancers. The player(s) can choose to follow Jackson or the backup dancers. All pictograms in this game move from bottom to top. After performing songs, players are able to unlock training videos in the "Dance School" where they are taught some of the more difficult moves from several of Jackson's music videos and stage performances.

=== Nintendo DS ===
The Nintendo DS shows is a cartoon version of Jackson on the top screen, and the player follows along by tapping the bottom screen with the stylus to the rhythm of the music.

The DS version is notable for an anti-piracy measure that will freeze the game and replace the audio with the sound of vuvuzelas (popularized by the South Africans in World Cup 2010) if the game is detected as an unauthorized copy.

=== PlayStation Portable ===
In the PlayStation Portable version, the player follows Jackson by pressing the action buttons when it hits the circle. The gameplay style and songs are the same as the DS version, but there are more songs than the DS version of the game, such as "Will You Be There" and "Rock with You". There is still the Show Time part of each song, but when the player spins a wheel to light up the stage, it is replaced with the screen telling the player to press the L and R buttons as fast as possible.

=== Kinect ===
The Kinect version of the game includes full body motion technology and judges on how well the moves are done.

The Kinect version of the game features full body tracking, and an entirely different choreography from the Wii version, similar to Kinect's Dance Central series, along with several other changes and additions. This version uses a technology called Player Projection, which puts the player's own image in the game allowing them to star in the video. The Kinect version includes two game modes: "Solo" and "Party" which allows 2–4 players.

There are two options in Party mode: "Co-Op" and "Battle". In Co-Op mode, players take turns jumping in and jumping out in order to complete the song. Battle mode has two teams face off to get the highest score. One player on the team dances and the other sings. Party mode only features Dance Mode, Performance Mode and Master Performance Mode.

There are four symbols to represent each player: Jackson's glove, Jackson's hat, Jackson's shades and one of Jackson's jackets. Several of the songs in the game do not feature any moves to perform, instead becoming "Singing Only" songs. Some moves can be taught in a practice mode called "MJ School".

During each performance, a crown pops up above the player's head and the player must hit the crown to activate "King Power" before it fades away. The crown, appearing only once per song, will multiply the score by eight. Similar to the Wii version, the player is scored on how well they sing and dance. The player can get five different grades: "Perfect", "Good" and "OK" increases the player's score, while "Almost" and "Miss" may cause the player to lose their current score. Points add up at the end of each song along with the rating of stars the player receives and a photo the player takes during their performance. Players can either use the Kinect's built-in microphone, an attached mic/headset or the Xbox 360 Wireless Microphone for karaoke (much like the Lips series). The game does include the option, however, to choose a "Dance Only" version of the song, which means the player will not be asked to sing. The Kinect version also features a mode known as Master Performance, which requires the player to both sing and dance to a set of choreographed moves that are harder than the normal moves and "as close as possible to the videos".

=== PlayStation 3 ===
The PlayStation 3 version features the same gameplay as the Wii version. In addition to the singing and dancing functionalities found in the Kinect version, this version allows the player to sing or dance at the same time as other players. There is also the option to record the video clips or take pictures of the player's performance, and allows the player to save or upload them to sites, such as Facebook. In this version of the game, all the songs from the Wii version are included, but new songs such as "Stranger in Moscow", "I Just Can't Stop Loving You", and "Blood on the Dance Floor", are added.

=== Nintendo 3DS ===
In the Nintendo 3DS version, there is a CGI version of Jackson on the top screen, and the player draws different shapes with the stylus on the bottom screen to follow along. This version, alongside the PlayStation Vita and IOS versions, including Hollywood Tonight from the posthumous album, Michael.

=== PlayStation Vita and iOS ===
The PlayStation Vita and iOS versions were ported with Improved graphics in HD, Multiplayer (AD-Hoc), Trophy Support, Motion Sensor support, Multi-touch support, and instead of taking off the on-screen notes, it was replaced with the ability to use the rear touch pad for an even harder challenge and since both the Vita and the iOS devices use the multi-touch, the difficulty has been given an upgrade to increase the challenge. The PS Vita and iOS versions, compared to the 3DS version, have been given a whole new look in graphics and resolution, with the player being able to use their finger instead of a 3DS stylus. The Vita and iOS versions do not have any downloadable content.

== List of songs ==
Song	Album	Year	Wii	DS	PSP	Vita, 3DS and iOS	PS3 and 360	Mac OS X	iPad 2	iPhone	Difficulty
"Bad"*	Bad	1987	Yes	Yes	Yes	Yes	Yes	Yes	Yes	Yes	Medium/Medium
"Beat It"*	Thriller	1982	Yes	Yes	Yes	Yes	Yes	Yes	Yes	Yes	Medium/Hard
"Billie Jean"*	Thriller	1982	Yes	Yes	Yes	Yes	Yes	Yes	Yes	Yes	Medium
"Black or White"*	Dangerous	1991	Yes	Yes	Yes	Yes	Yes	Yes	Yes	Yes	Hard/Medium
"Don't Stop 'Til You Get Enough"*	Off the Wall	1979	Yes	Yes	Yes	Yes	Yes	Yes	Yes	Yes	Medium/Medium
"Leave Me Alone"	Bad	1987	Yes	Yes	Yes	Yes	Yes	Yes	Yes	Yes	Easy
"Smooth Criminal"**	Bad	1987	Yes	Yes	Yes	Yes	Yes	Yes	Yes	Yes	Medium/Easy
"Thriller"*	Thriller	1982	Yes	No	Yes	Yes	Yes	Yes	Yes	No	Inhuman/Hard
"The Way You Make Me Feel"*	Bad	1987	Yes	Yes	Yes	Yes	Yes	No	No	Yes	Medium/Medium
"Remember the Time"**	Dangerous	1991	Yes	No	Yes	Yes	Yes	No	Yes	Yes	Hard/Hard
"Ghosts"**	Blood on the Dance Floor: HIStory in the Mix	1997	Yes	No	No	Yes	Yes	Yes	Yes	Yes	Hard/Medium
"Another Part of Me"	Bad	1987	Yes	Yes	Yes	Yes	Yes	Yes	Yes	No	Medium
"Rock with You"*	Off the Wall	1979	Yes	No	Yes	Yes	Yes	No	Yes	No	Easy
"Heal the World"	Dangerous	1991	Yes	Yes	Yes	No	Yes	Yes	No	No	Easy
"Wanna Be Startin' Somethin'"*	Thriller	1982	Yes	Yes	Yes	No	Yes	No	No	No	Medium
"Speed Demon"	Bad	1987	Yes	No	No	Yes	Yes	No	Yes	Yes	Hard/Hard
"Streetwalker"	Bad: Special Edition	1988 (recording) 2001 (release date)	Yes	Yes	Yes	No	Yes	No	No	No	Easy
"Who Is It"	Dangerous	1991	Yes	No	No	No	Yes	Yes	Yes	No	Easy
"Blood on the Dance Floor"	Blood on the Dance Floor: HIStory in the Mix	1997	No	No	No	Yes	Yes	No	Yes	Yes	Hard
"Will You Be There"	Dangerous	1991	Yes	No	Yes	No	Yes	No	Yes	No	Medium/Easy
"The Girl Is Mine" (feat. Paul McCartney)	Thriller	1982	Yes	No	Yes	No	Yes	No	No	No	Easy/Easy
"I Just Can't Stop Loving You" (feat. Siedah Garrett)	Bad	1987	No	No	No	No	Yes	No	Yes	No	Easy/Easy
"They Don't Care About Us"*	HIStory: Past, Present and Future, Book I	1995	Yes	No	No	No	Yes	No	Yes	No	Hard/Medium
"Hollywood Tonight"	Michael	2010	No	No	No	Yes	No	No	Yes	Yes	Hard
"Working Day and Night"	Off the Wall	1979	Yes	No	No	No	Yes	No	No	No	Medium
"Dirty Diana"	Bad	1987	Yes	No	No	No	Yes	No	No	No	Easy/Medium
"In the Closet"	Dangerous	1991	Yes	No	No	No	Yes	No	No	No	Medium/Medium
"Money"	HIStory: Past, Present and Future, Book I	1995	Yes	No	No	No	Yes	No	No	No	Medium
"Earth Song"	HIStory: Past, Present and Future, Book I	1995	Yes	No	No	No	Yes	No	No	No	Medium
"Stranger in Moscow"	HIStory: Past, Present and Future, Book I	1995	No	No	No	No	Yes	Yes	No	No	Easy
"Sunset Driver"	The Ultimate Collection	1982 (recording) 2004 (release date)	Yes	No	No	No	Yes	No	No	No	Hard

- A "*" indicates that there is a dance teaching video of that song.
- A "**" indicates that there is a three-part dance teaching video of that song.

All of the songs from the album Invincible are excluded from the game.

In the Wii version of the game, "Money" is incorrectly credited as a song from the album Blood on the Dance Floor: HIStory in the Mix which was released in 1997. This would be true if the song in the game was the remix but it is the original version of the song, released on HIStory: Past, Present and Future, Book I in 1995.

"Another Part of Me" is a Walmart exclusive and is only present in just selected copies.

== Development ==
Roughly two weeks after Jackson's death in 2009, MJ Productions announced that a Jackson-based game had been in development for several months.

The game was displayed at New York Comic Con at Ubisoft's booth.

== Reception ==
Reception

Aggregate scores
Aggregator	Score
GameRankings	(X360) 65.34% (NDS) 64.25% (PS3) 62.88% (3DS) 62.00% (Wii) 59.92% (Vita) 59.73% (PSP) 42.50%
Metacritic	(PS3) 66/100 (NDS) 64/100 (X360) 63/100 (3DS) 59/100 (iOS) 58/100 (Vita) 57/100 (Wii) 56/100

Review scores
Publication	Score
Destructoid	6/10
Eurogamer	8/10
GameSpot	6.5/10
GameTrailers	5.1/10
IGN	6.5/10
Official Nintendo Magazine	59%
PlayStation Official Magazine – UK	6/10
Play	2.6/10
VideoGamer.com	7/10
The Guardian	3/5

Michael Jackson: The Experience was met with generally mixed reviews, with most of them citing the varied differences between the different versions of the game. The reviews for the DS and PSP versions were above average, with a slightly better score for the DS version. IGN gave a 6.5/10 for DS and 5.5/10 for the PSP. Destructoid gave a 6/10 for the DS version.

IGN gave the Wii version a 3.5 saying that it does not give clear instructions on how to dance and also criticized the controls. Metro gave it 5/10, describing it as "perfectly good party fun if you don't care that the controls don't work." VideoGamer.com gave the review a 7/10, stating that the music overplays the responsiveness difficulty. CNET gave the game 5/5, writing that the game is "extremely easy to pick up and play" and "the choreography is amazing" The Escapist gave the game 4/5, noting that the game "is not meant to be played by yourself".

Eurogamer thought that the dance routines in the Xbox 360 game "feel a little slower and more simplistic than those in the PS3 game".

== See also ==
- Michael Jackson in video games
