= Immortal (Michael Jackson album) =

Soundtrack album and remix album by Michael Jackson
- Released: November 18, 2011
- Recorded: 1968–2007 (original tracks); 2011 (additional mixes and overdubs)
- Length: 76:34 (standard edition); 106:09 (deluxe edition)
- Labels: Epic; Sony; MJJ
- Producers: Michael Jackson; Kevin Antunes

Michael Jackson chronology
Michael (2010)	Immortal (2011)	Bad 25 (2012)

Singles from Immortal
- 1. "Immortal Megamix: Can You Feel It/Don't Stop 'Til You Get Enough/Billie Jean/Black or White (Immortal Version)" Released: November 1, 2011

Immortal is a remix album of music originally recorded by American recording artist Michael Jackson, released on November 18, 2011, by Epic Records. The album is also a soundtrack to Cirque du Soleil's Michael Jackson: The Immortal World Tour, which debuted on October 2, 2011, in Montreal. It was preceded by the release of the title track in the form of a megamix: "Immortal Megamix", which features the songs: "Can You Feel It", "Don't Stop 'Til You Get Enough", "Billie Jean" and "Black or White".

== Background and release ==
On October 3, 2011, Sony Music Entertainment announced that over 40 of Jackson's original recordings had been redesigned and reimagined by producer Kevin Antunes (Justin Timberlake, Rihanna) after working with original multi-track master recordings in the studio for a year. Immortal continued in the production vein of soundtracks from previous Cirque du Soleil shows: namely, 2006's Love, featuring the remixed music of the Beatles (for the show of the same name); and 2010's Elvis Presley-themed remix soundtrack Viva Elvis (for the show of the same name).

Being released by Epic Records in conjunction with the estate of Jackson, Immortal featured an alternative version of the Jackson 5 song "ABC", as well as a series of mashups and remixes, such as a choir-assisted rendition of "They Don't Care About Us". Despite over 60 songs having been used for the stage show, the album release is available only as either a 20-track album or deluxe 27-track album.

Immortal is the eighth Jackson album to be released by Sony and Universal Motown since Jackson's death on June 25, 2009. It is also the third set of remixes of Jackson's music that has been released posthumously, following two 2009 collections: The Stripped Mixes, Jackson's early songs with most of the rhythm section edited out; and four EPs under the common title The Remix Suite.

== Promotion ==
The debut track from the album, "Immortal Megamix", composed of four of Jackson's greatest hits—"Can You Feel It", "Don't Stop 'Til You Get Enough", "Billie Jean" and "Black or White"—was unveiled on AOL Music on October 31, 2011. Following the premiere on AOL, the track became available to stream at Jackson's official website and Facebook page. On November 1, 2011, the track became available as a digital download on iTunes and Amazon. There was no television promotion or radio airplay.

The week before the soundtrack's release, several tracks were unveiled on SoundCloud and Billboard:

- "You Are Not Alone/I Just Can't Stop Loving You (Immortal Version)", on November 14, 2011.
- "Wanna Be Startin' Somethin' (Immortal Version)", on November 15, 2011.
- "I'll Be There (Immortal Version)" and "Dancing Machine/Blame It on the Boogie (Immortal Version)", on November 16, 2011.
- "This Place Hotel/Smooth Criminal/Dangerous (Immortal Version)"^{[note a]} and "Is It Scary/Threatened/Thriller (Immortal Version)"^{[note b]} on November 17, 2011.

Antunes, the musical designer for Immortal, said, "There are jewels throughout this entire CD ... put there so you can truly appreciate Michael's musicality," adding, "It lifts you up, it challenges, it makes you feel. Being a super-fan myself, having the ability to work on this music is a true honor." The entire album was unveiled via NPR on November 18, 2011.

== Commercial performance ==
In the United States, an early estimate predicted Immortal would sell 50,000 copies in its first week. The album opened with 43,000 copies sold, debuting at No. 24 on the Billboard 200. Immortal's opening week was more successful than the troupe's previous Viva Elvis, which had debuted and peaked at No. 48 in 2010 with 13,000 sold in its first week. In Japan, 150,000 CD copies of Immortal were sold during the first week of its release.

Immortal was ranked number 174 on the list of the 200 best-selling albums of 2012 from the year-end charts of Billboard. It was also ranked number 35 on the top-selling 100 R&B albums of 2012. It is currently the second-best selling Cirque show release, after Love.

== Critical reception ==
The debut song, "Immortal Megamix", received mixed reviews from music critics. Scott Shetler from PopCrush said the original songs were "left intact on this remix with only slight musical embellishments, such as a 'Michael! Michael!' chant that appears during 'Billie Jean'". While Shetler felt that other mixes, such as the "HIStory Megamix" that preceded Jackson's 1995 double album, were better, he also felt that, "with [Jackson's] legacy of musical gold, it would be nearly impossible to create a bad mix."

The album itself also received mixed reviews. Ann Powers from NPR said the soundtrack "adds another dimension to the Jackson omnibus" and "crafts a new version of Jackson's life story through remixes of his biggest hits and a few obscurities, as well as his own stated favorite songs." Randall Roberts from the Los Angeles Times gave the album two and a half stars out of four, stating, "the soundtrack is beholden to the Cirque/Immortal storyline and therefore sequenced not for the dance floor but for a Las Vegas-style production." Chad Grischow from IGN observed that "the collection at least does a fine job pulling from the various eras of his career", even though "most of the songs are simply clipped into a shorter version of themselves, with the occasional sound effects to enhance the choreography left feeling odd without it."

Gary Trust and Keith Caulfield from Billboard pointed out that "consumers surely didn't seem that interested in the mash-up style album." Nekesa Mumbi Moody from The Associated Press said, "much of the album seems disjointed. Some songs are oddly chopped up, others are spliced together without much finesse, and there are a myriad of sound effects — bullets firing, glass shattering, the whistle of a train, basketballs bouncing — that just sound like noise". Moody concluded that, "on stage, it probably all makes sense beautifully ... but without that visual picture, the listening experience is a disappointment."

Killian Fox of The Observer noted that "not much here is new", adding that "the album tries to justify its bulky existence" but ultimately "add[s] little to a catalogue of music that has already been superbly produced." Arwa Haider from Metro said, "the original songs are obviously fantastic", but "without the accompanying Cirque du Soleil acrobatics, these slightly spooky mixes don't add much to his canon." Michael Langston Moore from African American Entertainment Examiner said the album was "deemed to be a bit sacrilege".

== Track listing ==
Standard edition
No.	Title	Additional artist(s)	Length
1.	"Workin' Day and Night" (Immortal Version)		3:36
2.	"The Immortal Intro" (Immortal Version)	The Jackson 5; Janet Jackson	3:07
3.	"Childhood" (Immortal Version)		4:35
4.	"Wanna Be Startin' Somethin'" (Immortal Version)		3:07
5.	"Dancing Machine/Blame It on the Boogie" (Immortal Version)	The Jacksons	4:49
6.	"This Place Hotel" (Immortal Version)	The Jacksons	2:08
7.	"Smooth Criminal" (Immortal Version)		1:59
8.	"Dangerous" (Immortal Version)		2:41
9.	"The Jackson 5 Medley: I Want You Back/ABC/The Love You Save" (Immortal Version)	The Jackson 5	3:45
10.	"Speechless/Human Nature" (Immortal Version)		3:18
11.	"Is It Scary/Threatened" (Immortal Version)	Rockwell; 50 Cent	5:05
12.	"Thriller" (Immortal Version)		3:32
13.	"You Are Not Alone/I Just Can't Stop Loving You" (Immortal Version)	Siedah Garrett	6:07
14.	"Beat It/State of Shock" (Immortal Version)	The Jacksons and Mick Jagger	3:09
15.	"Jam" (Immortal Version)	Heavy D	2:37
16.	"Planet Earth/Earth Song" (Immortal Version)		4:04
17.	"They Don't Care About Us" (Immortal Version)		3:36
18.	"I'll Be There" (Immortal Version)	The Jackson 5	1:53
19.	"Immortal Megamix: Can You Feel It/Don't Stop 'Til You Get Enough/Billie Jean/Black or White" (Immortal Version)	The Jacksons	9:08
20.	"Man in the Mirror" (Immortal Version)		4:17
Total length:			76:34

Deluxe edition Disc 1
No.	Title	Additional artist(s)	Length
1.	"Workin' Day and Night" (Immortal Version)		3:36
2.	"The Immortal Intro" (Immortal Version)	The Jackson 5; Janet Jackson	3:07
3.	"Childhood" (Immortal Version)		4:35
4.	"Wanna Be Startin' Somethin'" (Immortal Version)		3:08
5.	"Shake Your Body (Down to the Ground)" (Immortal Version)	The Jacksons	2:27
6.	"Dancing Machine/Blame It on the Boogie" (Immortal Version)	The Jacksons	4:04
7.	"Ben" (Immortal Version)		3:44
8.	"This Place Hotel" (Immortal Version)	The Jacksons	2:08
9.	"Smooth Criminal" (Immortal Version)		1:59
10.	"Dangerous" (Immortal Version)		2:41
11.	"The Mime Segment: (I Like) The Way You Love Me/Speed Demon/Another Part of Me" (Immortal Version)		2:52
12.	"The Jackson 5 Medley: I Want You Back/ABC/The Love You Save" (Immortal Version)	The Jackson 5	3:45
13.	"Speechless/Human Nature" (Immortal Version)		3:20
14.	"Is It Scary/Threatened" (Immortal Version)	Rockwell; 50 Cent	5:03
15.	"Thriller" (Immortal Version)		3:37
Total length:			53:42

Deluxe edition Disc 2
No.	Title	Additional artist(s)	Length
1.	"You Are Not Alone/I Just Can't Stop Loving You" (Immortal Version)	Siedah Garrett	6:08
2.	"Beat It/State of Shock" (Immortal Version)	The Jacksons and Mick Jagger	3:09
3.	"Jam" (Immortal Version)	Heavy D	2:37
4.	"Planet Earth/Earth Song" (Immortal Version)		4:01
5.	"Scream/Little Susie" (Immortal Version)	Janet Jackson	4:45
6.	"Gone Too Soon" (Immortal Version)		3:23
7.	"They Don't Care About Us" (Immortal Version)		3:37
8.	"Will You Be There" (Immortal Version)		4:56
9.	"I'll Be There" (Immortal Version)	The Jackson 5	1:50
10.	"Immortal Megamix: Can You Feel It/Don't Stop 'Til You Get Enough/Billie Jean/Black or White" (Immortal Version)	The Jacksons	9:08
11.	"Man in the Mirror" (Immortal Version)		4:14
12.	"Remember the Time/Bad" (Immortal Version)		4:39
Total length:			52:27

=== Track elements ===
Credits adapted from the album booklet liner notes.

- "The Immortal Intro" (Immortal Version) – "Remember the Time" / "You Rock My World" / "In the Closet" / "Stranger in Moscow" / "Bad" / "Smooth Criminal" / "Dangerous" / "Another Part of Me" / "The Way You Make Me Feel" / "Jam" / "Scream" / "I Want You Back" / "ABC" / "Rockin' Robin" / "Goin' Back to Indiana" / "I Got the Feelin'" (Motown audition) / "I'll Be There"
- "Dancing Machine" / "Blame It on the Boogie" (Immortal Version) – "Dancing Machine" / "Blame It on the Boogie" / "Why You Wanna Trip on Me"
- "Dangerous" (Immortal Version) – "Dangerous" / "In the Closet" (including elements from the music video, particularly Naomi Campbell's vocals)
- "The Mime Segment" (Immortal Version) – "(I Like) The Way You Love Me" / "Speed Demon" / "Workin' Day and Night" (1978 Home Demo recording) / "Hollywood Tonight" / "Another Part of Me" / "Stranger in Moscow" / "Black or White" (elements from the short film, specifically the black panther dance part)
- "The Jackson 5 Medley" (Immortal Version) – "I Want You Back" / "ABC" / "The Love You Save"
- "Is It Scary" / "Threatened" (Immortal Version) – "Is It Scary" / "Threatened" / "Somebody's Watching Me" / "Ghosts" / "Monster" / "Thriller"
- "You Are Not Alone" / "I Just Can't Stop Loving You" (Immortal Version) – "You Are Not Alone" / "I Just Can't Stop Loving You" / "Todo Mi Amor Eres Tú" / "Remember the Time"
- "Beat It" / "State of Shock" (Immortal Version) – "Beat It" / "State of Shock" / "Bad" (elements from the short film)
- "They Don't Care About Us" (Immortal Version) – "Scream" / "They Don't Care About Us" / "Tabloid Junkie" / "Privacy"
- "Will You Be There" (Immortal Version) – "Heal the World" / "Will You Be There"
- "Immortal Megamix" (Immortal Version) – "Can You Feel It" / "Don't Stop 'Til You Get Enough" / "Billie Jean" / "Black or White"

== Charts ==
=== Weekly charts ===
Weekly chart performance for Immortal
Chart (2011)	Peak position
Australian Albums (ARIA)	43
Austrian Albums (Ö3 Austria)	29
Belgian Albums (Ultratop Flanders)	13
Belgian Albums (Ultratop Wallonia)	17
Dutch Albums (Album Top 100)	17
French Albums (SNEP)	42
German Albums (Offizielle Top 100)	23
Irish Albums (IRMA)	69
Italian Albums (FIMI)	13
Japanese Albums (Billboard Japan)	9
Japanese Albums (Oricon)	11
New Zealand Albums (RMNZ)	35
Norwegian Albums (VG-lista)	34
Spanish Albums (Promusicae)	16
Swedish Albums (Sverigetopplistan)	59
Swiss Albums (Schweizer Hitparade)	17
UK Albums (Official Charts)	65
US Billboard 200	24
US Top R&B/Hip-Hop Albums (Billboard)	5

=== Year-end charts ===
Year-end chart performance for Immortal
Chart (2012)	Position
US Billboard 200	174
US Billboard R&B/Hip-Hop Albums	35

== Release history ==
List of release dates, showing country or region, record label, and format
Region	Date	Label	Format
Austria	November 18, 2011	Sony Music	CD; digital download
Netherlands	November 18, 2011	Sony Music	Digital download
Germany	November 18, 2011	Sony Music	CD; digital download
Germany	November 21, 2011	Sony Music	CD; digital download
United Kingdom	November 21, 2011	Sony Music	CD; digital download
France	November 21, 2011	Sony Music	CD; digital download
United States	November 21, 2011	Epic	CD; digital download
Spain	November 22, 2011	Sony Music	CD; digital download
Italy	November 22, 2011	Sony Music	CD; digital download
Japan	November 23, 2011	Sony Music Japan	CD
Australia	November 25, 2011	Sony Music	CD; digital download
Indonesia	December 22, 2011	Sony Music	CD
China	March 30, 2012	Sony Music China	CD

== See also ==
- List of unreleased songs recorded by Michael Jackson
- List of music released posthumously

== Notes ==
- ^{^[note a]} The three tracks are actually separated on the album but were joined together as one mix on SoundCloud.
- ^{^[note b]} Separated as two tracks on the album —"Is It Scary/Threatened" and "Thriller" —but joined together on SoundCloud.
