= (I Like) The Way You Love Me =

Single by Michael Jackson

from the album Michael
- Released: July 8, 2011
- Recorded: 1998–2004 (original); 2008-2010 (rework)
- Studio: Record One (Los Angeles); The Hit Factory (New York City)
- Genre: Pop; R&B; soul
- Length: 4:30 (The Ultimate Collection version); 4:34 (Michael version)
- Label: Epic
- Songwriter: Michael Jackson
- Producers: Michael Jackson; Theron "Neff-U" Feemster

Michael Jackson singles chronology
"All in Your Name" (2011)	"(I Like) The Way You Love Me" (2011)	"Immortal Megamix: Can You Feel It/Don't Stop 'Til You Get Enough/Billie Jean/Black or White (Immortal Version)" (2011)

Audio sample
- file; help

"(I Like) The Way You Love Me" is a song by American singer and recording artist Michael Jackson included on his posthumous album Michael, which was released in South Korea as a digital single on January 18, 2011, and released in Italian radio stations on July 8, 2011. The song previously appeared on The Ultimate Collection (2004) with the title "The Way You Love Me" as an unreleased track, with that version also appearing on the French edition of the compilation King of Pop. Shortly before Jackson's death, the song was re-arranged and more vocals were added. A clip of the song was remixed and released on the 2-disc deluxe edition of the Immortal album on November 21, 2011.

== Background and release ==
The song was originally written by Michael Jackson and Brad Buxer (uncredited) under the working title "Hanson" for the music group of the same name, although Jackson ended up keeping the song for himself. Work on the song began in mid-1998 and the song was considered for the Invincible album, but stayed unreleased in demo form until it was included on Michael's 2004 box set, The Ultimate Collection, with the title "The Way You Love Me".

The song, along with several demos from the Invincible sessions, was re-arranged in 2008. The new arrangement was produced by Theron "Neff-U" Feemster, as he mentioned, "Michael would express to me the importance of giving the world a gift. Giving them songs that would last forever. This song was released in its early stages of development. He wanted to revisit, nurture, and define the song more because MJ was a perfectionist at everything and nothing is ever done until he is smiling and dancing! It was like watching a flower grow and blossom in the spring."

== Composition ==
In this new version, a phone message was introduced at the beginning in which Jackson explains the composition of the song to longtime collaborator, Brad Buxer, and in which he sang the hook and described the drum arrangement of the track. The song has been re-arranged and more vocals have been added, and the treatment of "(I Like) The Way You Love Me" has created a counter-rhythm from a leftover bit of vocal play.

Compared with the 2004 version, the 2010 mix has different instrumentation, such as having a piano backing instead of a synthesizer. The song's structure is the same but Jackson's lead vocals return as the song fades out.

== Reception ==
The song received generally positive reviews from music critics. Leah Greenblatt of Entertainment Weekly called it a "sweet-toned swoon". Joe Vogel of HuffPost stated that the song was a "great new production by Neff-U", and "the new version retains all of the charm of the original while injecting some fresh elements, including new piano, bass, strings, and vocal effects." Jason Lipshutz, Gail Mitchell and Gary Graff from Billboard thought the song is "the simple sketch eventually led to this blissful love song with its layered vocals and gentle percussion". Michael Roffman of Consequence of Sound praised the track's "incredibly rich instrumentation" and called it "probably the greatest highlight of the album" and "one that felt the most natural, too". Kitty Empire in The Observer said this song was "a breezy bit of froth on which Jackson sounds genuinely carefree". Joe Pareles of The New York Times noted that the new instrumentation compared to the 2004 mix made the "creamy vocal harmonies even more reminiscent of the Beach Boys". Pareles also questioned whether the ending vocals of the song were digitally altered from the original chorus but stated that he preferred the new version, describing it as more "transparent and uncluttered, a little more lighthearted".

Negative review came from Dan Martin of NME, saying this song "covers boring mid-tempo R&B territory".

== Chart performance ==
The song was released as the fourth single from the album, Michael. It debuted on the Italian Airplay Chart on July 17, 2011 at number 86. It has not charted in any other major music charts.

== Track listing ==
Digital download
No.	Title	Length
1.	"(I Like) The Way You Love Me" (album version)	4:33
2.	"(I Like) The Way You Love Me" (edit)	4:17
Total length:		8:50

== Personnel ==
- Written, composed, lead vocal, background vocals and beatbox by Michael Jackson
- Produced by Theron "Neff-U" Feemster and Michael Jackson
- Arrangement by Theron "Neff-U" Feemster
- Piano by Will Champlin
- Background vocals by Michael Durham Prince
- Engineered by Michael Prince, James Murray, Charlie Hanes and Tim Roberts
- Mixed by Serban Ghenea
- Guitar by Erick Donell Walls
- Bass by Thomas Drayton
- Drums by Joe Corcoran and James Porte
- Percussion by Paulinho da Costa
- Rhythm by Paulinho da Costa
- Programming by Theron "Neff-U" Feemster

== Release history ==
Release history for "(I Like) The Way You Love Me"
Region	Date	Format
South Korea	January 18, 2011	Digital download
Italy	July 8, 2011	Radio airplay
China	July 27, 2011	Radio airplay

== See also ==
- List of unreleased songs recorded by Michael Jackson
- Death of Michael Jackson
- List of music released posthumously
