= Mind Is the Magic: Anthem for the Las Vegas Show =

Compilation album by Siegfried & Roy including Michael Jackson
- Released: July 10, 2009
- Genre: Pop
- Length: 41:08
- Label: ZYX

Michael Jackson chronology
| The Collection (2009) | Mind Is the Magic: Anthem for the Las Vegas Show (2009) | The Stripped Mixes (2009) |

Singles from Mind Is the Magic: Anthem for the Las Vegas Show
- 1. "Mind Is the Magic" Released: February 26, 2010

Mind Is the Magic: Anthem for the Las Vegas Show is a compilation album by Siegfried & Roy that includes a Michael Jackson song titled "Mind Is the Magic". The album was released on July 10, 2009 by German record label ZYX Music in Europe.

== Track listing ==
| No. | Title | Writer(s) | Length |
|---|---|---|---|
| 1. | "Mind Is the Magic" (by Michael Jackson) | Michael Jackson, Bryan Loren | 6:16 |
| 2. | "Magical" | | 4:09 |
| 3. | "Kiato" | | 3:12 |
| 4. | "The Power of the Magic" | | 4:45 |
| 5. | "The Secret Gallery" | | 3:31 |
| 6. | "Saltimbanco" | | 4:02 |
| 7. | "Sarmoti" | | 5:22 |
| 8. | "Magicians of the Century" | | 3:45 |
| 9. | "Vision" | | 3:28 |
| 10. | "Magic" | | 2:55 |
| 11. | "The Theatre Trailer" | | 0:19 |

== Single ==
The leading track of this album was released as a single in Europe on February 26, 2010, reaching #80 in France on April 3, 2010.

This song was not a new release; it was written by Jackson with Bryan Loren in 1989 for Siegfried & Roy's 'Beyond Belief Show' in Las Vegas. Jackson gave his permission for Siegfried & Roy to release this song on their German album Dreams & Illusions in 1995. The introduction from the song formed part of "The Drill" segment planned for Jackson's This Is It concerts.
