= Mind Is the Magic =

Single by Michael Jackson

from the album Dreams & Illusions and Mind Is the Magic: Anthem for the Las Vegas Show
- Released: 1995 (initial release); February 26, 2010 (re-release)
- Recorded: 1989
- Genre: R&B; new jack swing; funk rock; pop
- Length: 6:16
- Label: ZYX
- Songwriter: Michael Jackson
- Producer: Michael Jackson

Michael Jackson singles chronology
"Wanna Be Startin' Somethin' 2008" (2008)	"Mind Is the Magic" (1995)	"Hold My Hand" (2010)

"Mind Is the Magic" is a song performed by American singer-songwriter Michael Jackson, written in 1989 for Siegfried & Roy's 'Beyond Belief Show' in Las Vegas. The song was first released on Siegfried & Roy's Dreams & Illusions in 1995. It was later re-released as a single in Europe on February 26, 2010, from the compilation album Mind Is the Magic: Anthem for the Las Vegas Show.

"Mind Is the Magic" reached No. 80 in France on April 3, 2010. Jackson gave his permission for Siegfried & Roy to release this song on their German album Dreams & Illusions in 1995. The introduction from the song formed part of "The Drill" segment planned for Jackson's This Is It concerts.

== Charts ==
Chart (2010)	Peak position
France (SNEP)	80

== Track listing ==
German CD maxi single
No.	Title	Length
1.	"Mind Is the Magic" (the original version of the Siegfried & Roy show)	6:14
2.	"Mind Is the Magic" (the original remix version)	3:30
3.	"Mind Is the Magic" (Falko Niestolik remix)	7:19
4.	"Mind Is the Magic" (Falko Niestolik radio edit)	3:56
Total length:		20:19
