= Immortal Megamix =

"Immortal Megamix: Can You Feel It/Don't Stop 'Til You Get Enough/Billie Jean/Black or White (Immortal Version)"

Single by Michael Jackson

from the album Immortal
- Released: November 1, 2011
- Recorded: 1978–1991
- Length: 4:53
- Label: MJJ; Epic
- Songwriters: Michael Jackson; Jackie Jackson; Bill Bottrell
- Producers: Michael Jackson; Kevin Antunes

Michael Jackson singles chronology
"(I Like) The Way You Love Me" (2011)	"Immortal Megamix: Can You Feel It/Don't Stop 'Til You Get Enough/Billie Jean/Black or White (Immortal Version)" (2011)	"I Just Can't Stop Loving You" (2012)

Licensed audio
- "Immortal Megamix: Can You Feel It/Don't Stop 'Til You Get Enough/Billie Jean/Black or White (Immortal Version)" on YouTube

"Immortal Megamix: Can You Feel It/Don't Stop 'Til You Get Enough/Billie Jean/Black or White (Immortal Version)", often shortened to just "Immortal Megamix", is a song by American singer Michael Jackson. It was released on November 1, 2011, as a single to precede the accompanying posthumous soundtrack/remix album, Immortal (2011).

== Background and release ==
In October 2011, Sony Music announced that the soundtrack to Cirque du Soleil's show Michael Jackson: The Immortal World Tour entitled Immortal.

"Immortal Megamix" became the debut track from this album, which was composed of four of Jackson's greatest hits—"Can You Feel It", "Don't Stop 'Til You Get Enough", "Billie Jean" and "Black or White". An edited version had been unveiled on AolMusic on October 31, 2011. On November 1, 2011, the full track became available as a digital single on iTunes and Amazon.com in Europe, United States, New Zealand and Australia.

== Critical reception ==
The song received mixed reviews from music critics. Scott Shetler from Popcrash said the original songs were "left intact on this remix with only slight musical embellishments, such as a 'Michael! Michael!' chant that appears during 'Billie Jean'", and despite other mixes as "HIStory Megamix" that preceded his 1995 double-album were better, "with his [Jackson's] legacy of musical gold, it would be nearly impossible to create a bad mix." Jillian Mapes from Billboard said, this single was "full of bombast and dance club glory", although "it starts off with scratching and drum rolls that feel like an odd fit for Jackson classics through the years", the song was "sure to get you moving."

== Track listing ==
Digital single

1. "Immortal Megamix: Can You Feel It/Don't Stop 'Til You Get Enough/Billie Jean/Black or White (Immortal Version)" – 9:08

== Charts ==
Chart (2011)	Peak position
Australia (ARIA)	41
Japan (Japan Hot 100)	34
