= Wanna Be Startin' Somethin' =

1983 single by Michael Jackson

"Wanna Be Startin'Somethin'"
- One of US 7-inch vinyl release artworks

Single by Michael Jackson

from the album Thriller
- B-side: "Rock with You" (live)
- Released: May 9, 1983
- Recorded: November 1978 (demo); 1982
- Studio: Westlake (Los Angeles)
- Genre: Post-disco; funk; Afropop
- Length: 6:03 (album version); 4:21 (single version); 6:30 (12" version)
- Label: Epic
- Songwriter: Michael Jackson
- Producers: Quincy Jones; Michael Jackson

Michael Jackson singles chronology
"Beat It" (1983)	"Wanna Be Startin'Somethin'" (1983)	"Human Nature" (1983)

Official audio
- "Wanna Be Startin'Somethin'" on YouTube

"Wanna Be Startin' Somethin'" is a song by American singer Michael Jackson recorded for his sixth studio album Thriller (1982). It is the opening track of the album and was released as its fourth single on May 9, 1983, by Epic Records. It was written and co-produced by Jackson and produced by Quincy Jones. The lyrics pertain to strangers spreading rumors to start an argument. The song has a similar sound to Jackson's previous studio album, Off the Wall, released in 1979. The song is characterized by a complex rhythm arrangement and a distinctive horn arrangement.

"Wanna Be Startin'Somethin'" became Jackson's fourth consecutive top 10 single from Thriller on the Billboard Hot 100, peaking at number five. The song also topped the charts in Canada as well as the Netherlands and charted within the top 20 and top 30 in several countries. It was generally well received by contemporary music critics. As part of the release of Thriller 25, a remix of "Wanna Be Startin'Somethin'", titled "Wanna Be Startin'Somethin'2008 with Akon", was recorded with Akon, and released as the second single from the album. The remix was commercially successful, charting within the top 10 in six countries, as well as the top 20 in several territories worldwide and top 40 in Canada. It was more successful internationally than in the United States, having peaked on the Billboard Hot 100 at number 81, which was the song's lowest charting position.

Unlike previous singles from Thriller, "Wanna Be Startin'Somethin'" did not have a music video to accompany it but was performed by Jackson on world concert tours as both a member of the Jacksons and as a solo artist. Following Jackson's death in June 2009, the song re-entered music charts worldwide. "Wanna Be Startin'Somethin'" has been covered and sampled by multiple recording artists since its release, notably by Rihanna in her 2007 song "Don't Stop the Music", who was sued as a result. Aside from Thriller, the song appears on multiple compilation and greatest hits albums by Jackson.

The 2026 biographical film Michael features this song in its opening scene.

== Background ==
"Wanna Be Startin'Somethin'" was written, composed and co-produced by Michael Jackson, and produced by Quincy Jones. It was originally written for his sister La Toya Jackson about her troubled relationship with her sisters-in-law, but Michael ended up recording the song, although La Toya would sometimes perform the song at her concerts. The song was originally recorded in 1978 for inclusion in the Off the Wall album, but was later re-recorded in fall 1982, in Los Angeles, California. "Wanna Be Startin' Somethin'" was one of the four songs that Jackson received writing credits on for his sixth studio album Thriller in 1982. The song was released by Epic Records as the fourth single from the album.

Aside from Thriller, "Wanna Be Startin'Somethin'" has appeared on multiple compilation and greatest hits albums by Jackson since the song's release. "Wanna Be Startin'Somethin'" appeared on the first disc of Jackson's two-disc compilation album HIStory: Past, Present and Future, Book I in 1995 as well as the 25th anniversary edition of Thriller, titled Thriller 25, and the greatest hits album King of Pop; both albums were released in 2008. The song is also included on the box set collection released in 2004, The Ultimate Collection, the greatest hits album The Essential Michael Jackson, the compilation album This Is It, and the special box set The Collection released days after Jackson's death. The song was also remixed to the Immortal album in 2011. The demo version of the song was also released in This Is It (2009).

== Composition ==
A post-disco, funk, and Afropop song, "Wanna Be Startin'Somethin'" was viewed as a nod to the disco sound of Jackson's material on his previous studio album, Off the Wall, released in 1979. Arranged by Jackson himself and played by percussionist Paulinho da Costa, the song's rhythm was regarded as a "complex interweaving of drum-machine patterns and work", while the horn section, arranged by Jerry Hey, was described as both "brassy and precise". Slant Magazine commented that the song was a "complicated tapestry of colliding hooks and pop references." The song's lyrics, "Too high to get over, too low to get under", has strong similarities to Funkadelic's opening salvo for "One Nation Under a Groove".

The lyrics pertain to the media and press, as well as gossip and people trying to start arguments. In "Wanna Be Startin'Somethin'", Jackson's vocal range spans from E_{3} to A_{5}. The sheet music for the song shows four sharps with a suggested tempo of "moderately bright" in common time. It has a basic sequence of D/E–E–D/E–E as its chord progression, similar to that of "Don't Stop 'Til You Get Enough". The coda at the end of the song - "Mama-say mama-sah ma-ma-coo-sah" - is a variant of a lyric in Cameroonian saxophonist Manu Dibango's 1972 disco song "Soul Makossa". Makossa is a Cameroonian music genre and dance. Dibango sued Jackson and, in 1986, settled out of court for one million French francs, agreeing thereby to waive future rights to this recording but not future use of the material.

== Critical reception ==
Christopher Connelly, a writer for Rolling Stone, described "Wanna Be Startin'Somethin'" as being Thriller's "most combative track". Connelly noted that in the "hyperactive" song, Jackson's "emotions are so raw that the song nearly goes out of control". He further commented that the song has a "tune that's almost as exciting as seeing Jackson motivate himself across a concert stage — and a lot more unpredictable". Remarking that while the song's lyrics "won't keep Elvis Costello awake nights", they "do show that Jackson has progressed past the hey-let's-hustle sentiments that dominated Off the Wall". He added that Jackson's "raw ability and conviction make material like "Baby Be Mine" and "Wanna Be Startin'Somethin'" into first-class cuts". Cash Box called the song a "smash," specifically praising the "danceable groove...superb arrangement and strange but ultimately uplifting lyrics."

Stephen Thomas Erlewine, a writer for AllMusic, listed "Wanna Be Startin'Somethin'", along with "Beat It", "Billie Jean", and "Human Nature", as being the best songs from Thriller. He also described the song as the "freshest funk on the album". Eric Herderson, a writer for Slant Magazine, commented that with "three quick rimshots", he felt that "Wanna Be Startin'Somethin'" was like a "court fanfare". Robert Christgau, a music critic, commented that he'd "expect to bear more" of Thriller's "Wanna Be Startin'Somethin'" and "Thriller" on the "dancefloor" rather than in his "living room". "Wanna Be Startin'Somethin'" received one Grammy Award nomination; it was nominated for "Best R&B Song" at the 1984 Grammy Awards, but lost to "Billie Jean", another of Jackson's singles from Thriller.

Pitchfork ranked this song No. 2 on its list of "The 200 Best Songs of the 1980s", writing that "if you're going to become the biggest star in the world, it helps to make the biggest song".

== Chart performance ==
In 1983, "Wanna Be Startin' Somethin'" had a good chart performance worldwide. The song entered the Billboard Hot 100 chart top ten positions on July 2, 1983, at number nine, having moved up six places from the song's previous week. On July 16, "Wanna Be Startin' Somethin'" charted at number five, which was the song's peak position on the chart. The song's peak position made "Wanna Be Startin' Somethin'" Thriller's fourth consecutive single to peak within the top ten on the Billboard Hot 100. It was more commercially successful than Thriller's follow-up single "Human Nature" on the Billboard Hot 100, with the song peaking on the chart at number seven. The song also peaked within the top ten, at number five, on the Black Singles Chart.

Internationally, the song was commercially successful, mainly charting within the top 20 and top 30 on music charts. In the United Kingdom, on June 11, 1983, the song entered the chart's top 40 positions at number 38. The following week, the song moved up 24 positions to number 14, and on June 25, the song peaked within the top ten at number eight. The song remained on the charts for a total of nine weeks in 1983. In New Zealand, on July 24, 1983, "Wanna Be Startin' Somethin'" entered the charts at number 47. The following week, the song peaked at number 35, which was its peak position, and remained in the top 50 of the chart for three weeks. "Wanna Be Startin' Somethin'" entered the Dutch charts on July 9, 1983, charting within the top five at number four. The following week, the song charted at number three, which was its peak position, for three consecutive weeks. The song charted within the top ten for several weeks, and remained in the top 20 for ten weeks in 1983.

In 2008, after the release of Thriller 25 the song re-entered music charts worldwide. "Wanna Be Startin' Somethin'" entered the Italian music charts on February 21, 2008, charting at number 14; it remained on the chart for only one week. The song entered the Danish music charts on February 28, charting within the top 30 at number 29. The following week, it peaked at number 22. In Switzerland, the song entered the top 50 at number 47 on February 24, 2008. The following week, the song peaked at number 30. After a total of six weeks on the chart the song, fell out of the top 100, and after four weeks re-entered the chart at number 83, before falling off the chart again.

Following Jackson's death in June 2009, his music experienced a surge in popularity. "Wanna Be Startin' Somethin'" re-entered the United Kingdom charts on July 4, 2009, and peaked at number 57 the following week. On July 12, "Wanna Be Startin' Somethin'" re-entered Switzerland music charts for the second time. The song charted at number 37, which was its peak position, and remained on the charts for three weeks, before charting out of the top 100 positions.

== Live performances ==
Jackson and background dancers performing "Wanna Be Startin' Somethin'" during rehearsals for the This Is It concerts on June 23, 2009, two days before his death

"Wanna Be Startin' Somethin'" was one of the songs released as a single without an accompanying video. It became Michael Jackson's opening song for several concert tours, including the Victory Tour (1984) with the Jacksons, Bad World Tour (1987-1989), Dangerous World Tour (1992-1993), and HIStory World Tour (1996-1997). A version was released on the 2012 DVD Live at Wembley July 16, 1988.

Since March 2009, Jackson was preparing to perform "Wanna Be Startin' Somethin'" during his This Is It concert series from July 13, 2009 to March 6, 2010. During rehearsals at Staples Center for the This Is It comeback concerts at London's The O2 Arena, Jackson's performance of "Wanna Be Startin' Somethin'" contained an a cappella snippet of "Speechless", from Jackson's studio album Invincible (2001). Following Jackson's death in June of the same year, video footage of Jackson rehearsing the song was used as the opening song in the 2009 concert documentary, Michael Jackson's This Is It.

== Manu Dibango controversy ==
After Barbadian pop singer Rihanna sampled the song in her 2007 hit single "Don't Stop the Music", she and Jackson were both sued in February 2009 by Cameroonian musician Manu Dibango, who claimed that both songs used the "mama-say mama-sa mama-coo-sa" hook from his 1972 single "Soul Makossa" without permission. According to Agence France-Presse, Jackson admitted earlier that he had borrowed the line for "Wanna Be Startin' Somethin'" and had eventually settled financially with Dibango. However, when Rihanna asked only Jackson's permission to sample the line in 2007, Jackson allegedly approved the request without contacting Dibango beforehand. Dibango's attorneys brought the case before a court in Paris, demanding €500,000 in damages and for Sony BMG, EMI and Warner Music to be "barred from receiving 'mama-say mama-sa'-related income until the matter is resolved". The matter was settled out of court, where Dibango "worked out a financial agreement".

== Track listing ==
US 7" version

1. "Wanna Be Startin' Somethin'" (single version) – 4:19
2. "Wanna Be Startin' Somethin'" (instrumental) – 4:19

US 12" version

1. "Wanna Be Startin' Somethin'" (12" version) – 6:31
2. "Wanna Be Startin' Somethin'" (instrumental) – 6:31

Europe 7" version

1. "Wanna Be Startin' Somethin'" (single version) – 4:19
2. "Rock with You" (live with The Jacksons) – 3:58

Europe 12" version

1. "Wanna Be Startin' Somethin'" (12" version) – 6:31
2. "Wanna Be Startin' Somethin'" (instrumental) – 6:31
3. "Rock with You" (live with The Jacksons) – 3:58

== Personnel ==
Credits adapted from the album Thriller 25.

- Michael Jackson: lead and backing vocals, songwriting, drum programming
- Greg Phillinganes: Rhodes piano, synthesizer
- Michael Boddicker and Bill Wolfer: synthesizers
- David Williams: guitar
- Louis Johnson: bass
- Paulinho da Costa: percussion
- Jerry Hey, Gary Grant: trumpets, flugelhorns
- Larry Williams: saxophone, flute
- Bill Reichenbach: trombone
- Michael Jackson, Nelson Hayes and Steven Ray: bathroom stomp board
- Vocal arrangement by Michael Jackson
- Rhythm arrangement by Michael Jackson and Quincy Jones
- Horn arrangement by Jerry Hey and Michael Jackson
- Background vocals: Julia Waters, Maxine Waters, Oren Waters, James Ingram, Bunny Hull and Becky Lopez
- Produced by Quincy Jones
- Co-produced by Michael Jackson

== Charts ==
=== Weekly charts ===
1983 weekly chart performance for "Wanna Be Startin' Somethin'"
Chart (1983)	Peak position
Australia (Kent Music Report)	25
Belgium (Ultratop 50 Flanders)	3
Canada Adult Contemporary (RPM)	7
Canada Top Singles (RPM)	1
Germany (GfK)	16
Ireland (IRMA)	5
Netherlands (Dutch Top 40)	1
Netherlands (Single Top 100)	3
New Zealand (Recorded Music NZ)	35
Spain (AFYVE)	14
UK Singles (Official Charts)	8
US Billboard Hot 100	5
US Hot R&B/Hip-Hop Songs (Billboard)	5
US Cash Box Top 100	6

2008 weekly chart performance for "Wanna Be Startin' Somethin'"
Chart (2008)	Peak position
Denmark (Tracklisten)	22
Italy (FIMI)	14
Switzerland (Schweizer Hitparade)	30

2009 weekly chart performance for "Wanna Be Startin' Somethin'"
Chart (2009)	Peak position
Canada (Hot Canadian Digital Singles)	52
Netherlands (Single Top 100)	31
Switzerland (Schweizer Hitparade)	37
UK Singles (Official Charts)	57
UK Hip Hop/R&B (Official Charts)	18
US Digital Song Sales (Billboard)	20

2026 weekly chart performance for "Wanna Be Startin' Somethin'"
Chart (2026)	Peak position
France (SNEP)	98
Global 200 (Billboard)	114
UK Hip Hop/R&B (Official Charts)	10

=== Year-end charts ===
1983 year-end chart performance for "Wanna Be Startin' Somethin'"
Chart (1983)	Position
Belgium (Ultratop 50 Flanders)	11
Canada Top Singles (RPM)	38
Netherlands (Dutch Top 40)	17
Netherlands (Single Top 100)	23
US Billboard Hot 100	68
US Cash Box	51

== Certifications ==
Certifications for "Wanna Be Startin' Somethin'"
Region	Certification	Certified units/sales
Canada (Music Canada)	Platinum	80,000^{‡}
Denmark (IFPI Danmark)	Gold	45,000^{‡}
New Zealand (RMNZ)	Platinum	30,000^{‡}
United Kingdom (BPI)	Platinum	600,000^{‡}
United States (RIAA)	Platinum	1,000,000^{‡}
^{‡} Sales+streaming figures based on certification alone.

== Wanna Be Startin' Somethin' 2008 ==
"Wanna Be Startin' Somethin' 2008 with Akon"

Single by Michael Jackson

from the album Thriller 25
- Released: March 21, 2008
- Recorded: November 2007
- Length: 4:14 (album version); 3:51 (radio edit)
- Label: Epic; Legacy
- Songwriters: Michael Jackson; Aliaune Thiam; Giorgio Tuinfort
- Producers: Michael Jackson; Akon; Giorgio Tuinfort

Michael Jackson singles chronology
"The Girl Is Mine 2008" (2008)	"Wanna Be Startin' Somethin' 2008 with Akon" (2008)	"Mind Is the Magic" (2010)

Akon singles chronology
"I'll Still Kill" (2007)	"Wanna Be Startin' Somethin' 2008 with Akon" (2008)	"What You Got" (2008)

"Wanna Be Startin' Somethin'" was re-recorded for the 2008 re-issue of Thriller, titled Thriller 25. The song was titled on the CD sleeve as "Wanna Be Startin' Somethin' 2008 with Akon". Recorded in November 2007, the 2008 version was remixed, co-written and co-produced by Akon. This single was the last work released during Jackson's lifetime.

"Wanna Be Startin' Somethin'" received mixed reviews from contemporary music critics, with critics having felt that while the 2008 version was good, it was not better than the original, but was better than other re-issues on Thriller 25. Stephen Thomas Erlewine from AllMusic commented that "Wanna Be Startin' Somethin'" was turned into a "moody piano murk". He further commented that while the song is not great, "it is better than Fergie parroting the lyrics of 'Beat It' back to a recorded Jackson, and it's better than will.i.am turning 'The Girl Is Mine' into a hapless dance number". Rob Sheffield, a writer for Rolling Stone, commented that "Wanna Be Startin' Somethin'" is "actually kind of great" and praised the song's composition.

The song was released by Epic Records and Legacy Recordings on March 21, 2008. It was commercially a modest success internationally, charting within the top 20 in several countries, as well charting within the top ten in four territories. The song charted at number three in Sweden, number four in New Zealand, number eight in Australia and number ten in France. "Wanna Be Startin' Somethin' 2008" charted at number 15 in Belgium's Flanders and Wallonia charts. and also charted at number 20 in Italy. In the US, "Wanna Be Startin' Somethin' 2008" peaked at number 81 on the Billboard Hot 100, giving the song its lowest charting position. The song also charted on the Pop charts at number 48, as well as number 47 on the Pop Hot 100 Airplay.

Other charting positions include number 47 on the Billboard Hot Digital Songs and the Hot Canadian Digital Singles Chart at number 33. It also peaked at number 2 on the Dance Club Songs chart. "Wanna Be Startin' Somethin' 2008" also reached number 19 on the year-end chart of Dance Club Play Songs.

=== Track listing ===
- CD single
1. "Wanna Be Startin' Somethin' 2008" (radio edit) – 3:51
2. "Wanna Be Startin' Somethin' 2008" (Johnny Vicious club—radio edit) – 3:36
3. "Wanna Be Startin' Somethin' 2008" (Johnny Vicious full club remix) – 9:03

=== Remix credits ===
- Written and produced by Michael Jackson, Aliaune "Akon" Thiam, Giorgio Tuinfort
- Lead vocals by Aliaune "Akon" Thiam and Michael Jackson (on second verse)
- Background vocals by Michael Jackson
- Mixed by Mark "Evil" Goodchild
- Recorded in November 2007

=== Charts ===
2008 chart performance for "Wanna Be Startin' Somethin' 2008"
Chart (2008)	Peak position
Australia (ARIA)	8
Belgium (Ultratip Bubbling Under Flanders)	15
Belgium (Ultratip Bubbling Under Wallonia)	15
Canada (Hot Canadian Digital Singles)	33
Canada Hot 100 (Billboard)	32
Canada CHR/Top 40 (Billboard)	21
CIS Airplay (TopHit)	105
France (SNEP)	10
Germany (GfK)	63
Italy (FIMI)	20
Italy (Musica e Dischi)	48
New Zealand (Recorded Music NZ)	4
Romania (Romanian Top 100)	65
Sweden (Sverigetopplistan)	3
UK Singles (Official Charts)	69
US Billboard Hot 100	81
US Billboard Hot Dance Club Play	2
US Billboard Pop 100	48

2009 chart performance for "Wanna Be Startin' Somethin' 2008"
Chart (2009)	Peak position
France (SNEP)	52

2010 chart performance for "Wanna Be Startin' Somethin' 2008"
Chart (2010)	Peak position
France (SNEP)	98

== Cover versions and uses in popular culture ==
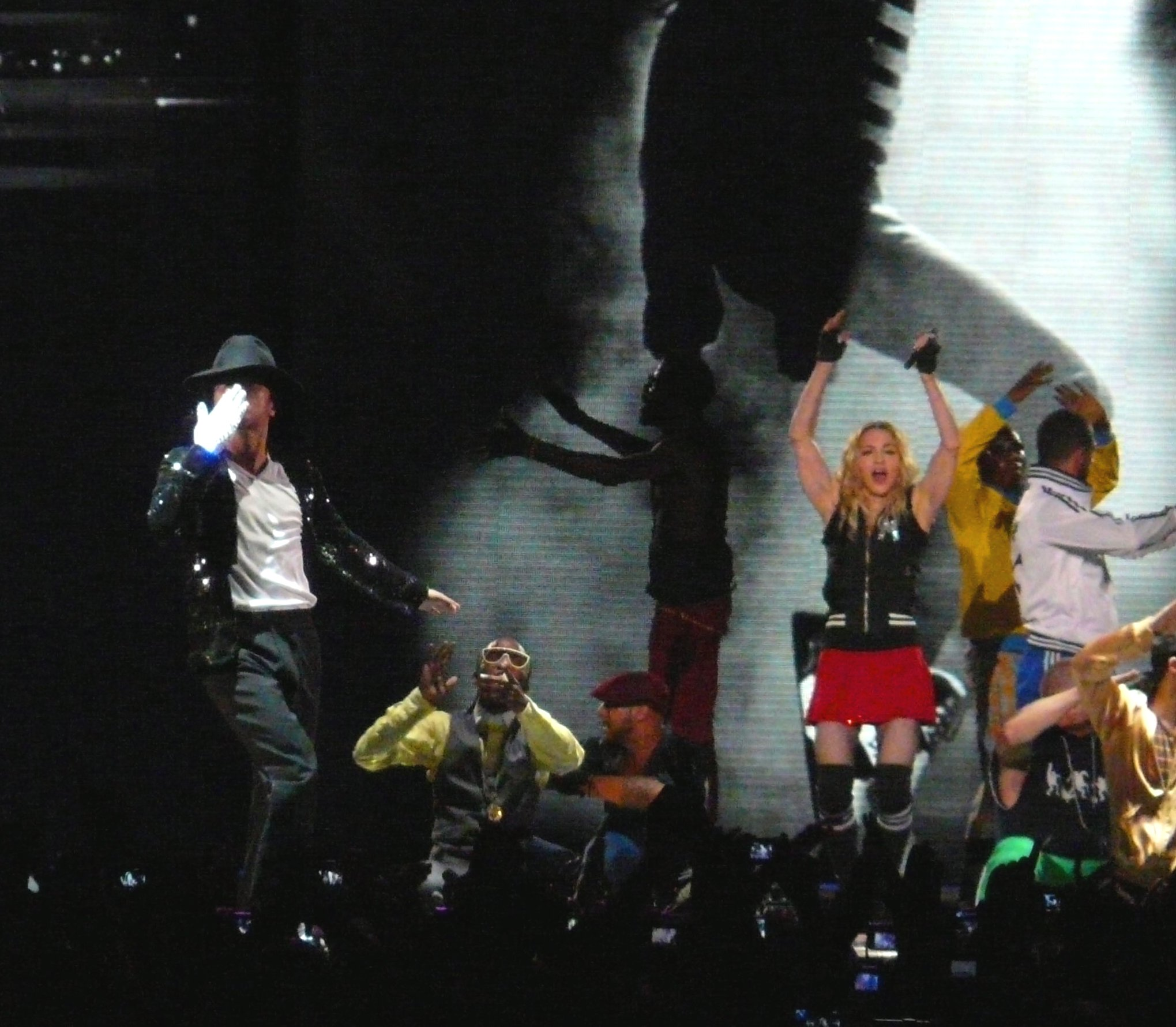
At her Sticky & Sweet Tour, Madonna and a dancer impersonating Jackson performed a medley of Jackson's music while photos of Jackson throughout his life were shown on a screen behind them.

- Jackson's elder sister La Toya Jackson has frequently covered the song. She used it to open her set at 1993's Sopot Song Festival, on MDR in the 1990s, and on the sixth season of the United Kingdom television show Celebrity Big Brother in 2009.
- Whitney Houston performed "Wanna Be Startin' Somethin'" as the opening selection throughout her Greatest Love World Tour in 1986, which ran from July to December. She also performed the song alongside Usher and Mýa during the Michael Jackson: 30th Anniversary Celebration shows on September 7 and 10, 2001 in MSG. In February 2010, she again performed the song, along with Jackson's "The Way You Make Me Feel", during her Nothing but Love World Tour.
- One week after Jackson's death, Madonna used that song as part of a medley of Jackson's songs as a tribute, during her second leg of her Sticky & Sweet Tour in July 2009. A dancer impersonated Jackson, performing his signature moves, like spinning, moonwalking and gyrating.
- Glee used it as the opening song in its "Michael" episode (2012). This cover debuted and peaked at number 78 on the Billboard Hot 100, number 46 on the Digital Songs chart and number 88 on the Canadian Hot 100 chart at the week of February 18, 2012. Darren Criss performed the song.
- Ashaye covered the song as part of his single "Michael Jackson Melody" in 1983.

== See also ==
- List of Dutch Top 40 number-one singles of 1983
- List of number-one singles of 1983 (Canada)
- La Toya Jackson
