= Monster (Michael Jackson song) =

Song by Michael Jackson (disputed) featuring 50 Cent

from the album Michael (2010 Edition)
- Released: December 10, 2010
- Recorded: 2007 (vocals and other basic tracks); 2010 (50 Cent's vocals, additional overdubs and final mixing)
- Studio: Angelikson Studios (Franklin Lakes, New Jersey); Boom Boom Room (Burbank, California) (50 Cent's vocals)
- Genre: Hip hop; R&B
- Length: 5:04
- Label: Epic
- Songwriters: Michael Jackson (disputed); Eddie Cascio; James Porte; Curtis Jackson (rap); Jason Malachi (?)
- Producers: Michael Jackson (disputed); Teddy Riley; Eddie Cascio

"Monster" is a song credited to American singer and recording artist Michael Jackson, featuring American rapper 50 Cent, released on the 2010 edition of Jackson's first posthumous album, Michael. The song was allegedly written by Jackson, Eddie Cascio, James Porte, and its rap part was written by Curtis Jackson. Along with "Breaking News" and "Keep Your Head Up", the song was allegedly recorded in the Porte/Cascios' basement in 2007. These tracks have been controversial since their release, with Jackson's fans and family members doubting their authenticity.

On August 21, 2018, the California Court of Appeal heard the oral argument for the appeal. It was incorrectly reported that Sony Music had conceded that the three songs "Breaking News", "Keep Your Head Up" and "Monster" were indeed performed by an impersonator, Jason Malachi, and not Jackson. However, Sony's lawyer Zia Modabber stated that "no one has conceded that Michael Jackson did not sing the songs". On July 6, 2022, Jackson's estate and Sony Music removed the song from streaming services Spotify and Apple Music amid allegations that the vocals are not Jackson's.

== Background and release ==
"Monster" was allegedly written by Michael Jackson, Eddie Cascio, and James Porte, with the rapping segment written by Curtis Jackson. Jackson allegedly recorded the songs in 2007 while he was living with the Cascio family in New Jersey. Other tracks recorded during that time include "Breaking News" and "Keep Your Head Up", as well as "All I Need", "All Right" (aka "Everything's Just Fine"), "Black Widow", "Burn Tonight", "Fall in Love" (aka "Let Me Fall in Love"), "Soldier Boy", "Ready 2 Win", "Stay" and "Water". 50 Cent did not record together with Jackson physically; after Jackson's death, he received a call to come into the studio and perform his portion of the track. Once in the studio, the rapper worked with producer Teddy Riley on the song.

On December 10, 2010, the song was officially released on the posthumous album Michael, and two original demo versions leaked online in 2015. Also, an alternative version that doesn't feature 50 Cent surfaced online before the album's official release.

== Critical reception ==
"Monster" received mainly negative reviews from music critics. Huw Jones from Slant Magazine said "Monster" is "weighed down by an unnecessary rap by the increasingly unnecessary 50 Cent". Alexis Petridis from The Guardian said the song was "a lumpy attempt to re-create the atmosphere of Thriller's title track". Greg Kot from the Chicago Tribune said the song picked up "an unfortunate theme in Jackson's latter-day work as the oppressed media victim".

== Controversy over authenticity ==
The authenticity of "Monster" was questioned as soon as it was released. Doubts over whether the vocals were actually by Jackson have been raised, reportedly by Jackson's mother Katherine and his two eldest children, in addition to many of his fans. His brother Randy Jackson posted a series of messages about the album on his Twitter account stating that family members were not allowed at his studio where the album was being completed. According to Randy, when producer Teddy Riley played him some of the tracks, "I immediately said it wasn't his voice".

In a statement, Sony Music Group countered that it had "complete confidence in the results of our extensive research, as well as the accounts of those who were in the studio with Michael, that the vocals on the new album are his own". Riley, Frank DiLeo and Jackson's estate have since defended Sony's claims that the song is authentic. Riley, who worked on the songs "Hollywood Tonight", "Monster" and "Breaking News", claimed that he had to do "more processing to the voice, which is why people were asking about the authenticity of his voice", stating, "With the Melodyne we actually move the stuff up which is the reason why some of the vibrato sounds a little off or processed, over-processed. We truly apologize for that happening, but you are still hearing the true Michael Jackson."

Riley later changed his mind, and stated in an interview with DJ Vlad on YouTube that he no longer thought that the vocals belonged to Michael Jackson.

Many fans who have cast doubt on the Cascio tracks have suggested that singer Jason Malachi sang the lead vocals of the Cascio tracks, but a statement by the Jackson Estate said that he was not involved in the recording. On January 16, 2011, a statement appeared on Malachi's Facebook page noting he was the vocalist of the songs in question, calling it his "confession". He later claimed on Myspace that his Facebook and official website were hacked. Malachi's manager Thad Nauden later that day told TMZ that "someone created a phony Facebook page in Jason's name. Jason wants everyone to know beyond a shadow of a doubt, he did not sing a single note on the album."

On August 23, 2018, it was reported that Sony had admitted in court that the vocals on the three Cascio songs were not performed by Jackson and were instead recorded after his death by Malachi. The reports omitted the first part of Sony Music's attorney's statement, "[F]or purposes of the argument," which is used in court not as an admission but rather to mean "even if the alleged action happened". The next day, Zia Modabber of Sony Music's law firm, Katten Muchin Rosenman, rebutted the reports directly, stating that "no one has conceded that Michael Jackson did not sing on the songs".

On July 6, 2022, Jackson's estate and Sony Music removed the song, along with "Breaking News" and "Keep Your Head Up", from streaming services Spotify and Apple Music amid the allegations that the vocals are not Jackson's.

== Other versions ==
- "Monster" (alternative version without rap) – 5:19
- "Monster" (Jody den Broeder & Chris Cox club mix) – 7:32
- "Monster" (Jody den Broeder & Chris Cox dub mix) – 6:15
- "Monster" (Jody den Broeder & Chris Cox radio edit) – 3:49
- "Monster" (original demo) – 5:05

== Personnel ==
- Written by Michael Jackson, Eddie Cascio and James Porte
- Published by Mijac Music, Jab Me Music, Curtis Jackson (50 Cent) Music Publishing
- Produced by Michael Jackson, Teddy Riley and Angelikson
- Mixed by Jean-Marie Horvat and Teddy Riley
- Programming by Teddy Riley
- Children screaming: Nigel and Naiden Maynard
- Recording engineer: Scott Elgin, Khaliq Glover a.k.a. Khaliq-O-Vision, Stuart Brawley, Quenton Gilkey (assistant engineer), Luis Navarro, Zachariah Redding (assistant engineer on the rap recorded at Boom Boom Room), Glen Marchese, Joe Corcoran, Drew Harris
- Rap performed by 50 Cent
- Drum programming: James Porte, Joe Cocoran and Chalmer McDermott
- Percussion by Rudy Bird and Joe Cocoran
- Bass by Eddie Cascio and Stuart Brawley
- Keyboards by Eddie Cascio and Stuart Brawley
- Guitars by Joe Corcoran and Orianthi
- Guitar effects by Jake Landau
- String arrangement by Eddie Cascio and Stuart Brawley
- Cello by Cameron Stone
- Violin by Sharon Jackson
- Background vocals by James Porte
- Digital editing by Joe Corcoran
- Assistant Mixed by John Baracan
- Assisted by Drew Harris and Fiona Brawley
- Recorded at The Backyard, Los Angeles
