= Michael (Michael Jackson album) =

Compilation album by Michael Jackson
- Released: December 10, 2010
- Recorded: 1982–2008 (vocals); 2010 (production and mixing)
- Studios: Studio at the Palms (Las Vegas); Record One (Los Angeles); Hit Factory (New York City); Hotel Bel-Air (Los Angeles); Marvin's Room (Los Angeles); Westlake (Los Angeles)
- Length: 27:24
- Labels: MJJ; Epic; Sony
- Producers: Michael Jackson; Akon; Brad Buxer; Theron "Neff-U" Feemster; Lenny Kravitz; John McClain; Teddy Riley; Giorgio Tuinfort

Michael Jackson chronology
Michael Jackson's This Is It (2009)	Michael (2010)	Immortal (2011)

Singles from Michael
- 1. "Hold My Hand" Released: November 15, 2010; 2. "Hollywood Tonight" Released: February 11, 2011; 3. "Behind the Mask" Released: February 21, 2011; 4. "(I Like) The Way You Love Me" Released: July 8, 2011

Michael is a posthumous compilation album by the American singer Michael Jackson. It was released on December 10, 2010, by Epic Records and Sony Music Entertainment. Michael is the first release of all-new Michael Jackson material since Invincible in 2001 and the seventh overall release since Jackson's death in 2009. The album was produced by Theron "Neff-U" Feemster, John McClain, Giorgio Tuinfort, Teddy Riley, and Brad Buxer, among others, and features guest performances by Akon and Lenny Kravitz.

Michael debuted at number three on the US Billboard 200 chart and was certified platinum by the Recording Industry Association of America (RIAA) in the United States. It produced four singles: "Hold My Hand", "Hollywood Tonight", "Behind the Mask", and "(I Like) The Way You Love Me", accompanied by music videos. "Hold My Hand" was a Billboard Hot 100 top 40 hit and has been certified gold in the US. Michael received mixed reviews from critics.

In 2022, following controversy concerning the authenticity of Jackson's vocals, the album was reissued with three songs removed: "Keep Your Head Up", "Monster" and "Breaking News".

== Background ==
Announced on November 12, 2010, Michael initially featured 10 tracks. "Breaking News" was the first song from the album to be released and was available for radio airplay. According to Sony, the song was recorded in the home studio of Jackson family friend Eddie Cascio in Franklin Lakes, New Jersey, in late 2007 and had been "recently brought to completion."

In the years prior to his death, Jackson was reported to be working with contemporary hitmakers such as singer-songwriter Akon and producer RedOne. The first official single from Michael, "Hold My Hand", was a duet with Akon recorded in late December 2007 at the Palms Casino Resort in Las Vegas, Nevada. Co-writer Claude Kelly told HitQuarters that it was the song's theme of friendship and togetherness that had struck a chord with Jackson. A handwritten note from Michael belonging to his Estate indicated his desire that "Hold My Hand" be the first single on his next project. However, in its unfinished state, the song leaked on June 30, 2008. Before the release, Akon stated that the final version would have more of Jackson's vocals. The song was released globally on Monday, November 15 at 12:01 am EST.

Prior to the album's release, a lawyer for Jackson's father Joe stated that Jackson was a perfectionist and "would never have wanted his unfinished material to be released". Jackson collaborator will.i.am said it was "disrespectful" to release the material, as Jackson was not able to approve it.

== Composition ==
Musically, Michael contains a mixture of styles, including R&B, pop, rock, dance, hip hop, funk and gospel. Thematically, the album features "inspirational, uplifting anthems" and "melodic, sweetly sung ballads" alongside more pointed songs levelling criticism at the news media, Hollywood and society in general. Jackson wrote or co-wrote five of the seven tracks.

The majority of the songs on the album were written and recorded during the Invincible (2001) era and onwards to the This Is It (2009) era. The album also contains two songs that were written during the Thriller (1982) era: "Behind the Mask" and "Much Too Soon". The latter features Australian musician Tommy Emmanuel on guitar. The song "(I Like) The Way You Love Me" previously appeared on The Ultimate Collection (2004) as an unreleased track, under the title "The Way You Love Me", but was re-arranged for Michael with additional vocals. The song "Best of Joy" is one of the last that Jackson recorded during his lifetime and was rewritten and recorded by him in November 2008 at the Hotel Bel-Air in Los Angeles, California, the year prior to his death.

== Artwork ==
The album cover artwork, a 2009 commissioned oil painting by artist Kadir Nelson, features two putti (one black, one white) placing a crown on Jackson's head against a mural depicting the images of the singer at different stages in his career. Nelson said that Jackson approached him several years ago to create a project detailing his life and career. The project stalled but was revived in 2009 by one of the estate's executors, John McClain, who had worked with Michael's sister Janet during her time at A&M. "Michael wears a golden suit of armor and stares at the viewer as he is crowned by cupids," Nelson said. "He places his hand over his heart and looks directly at the viewer, a symbol of Jackson's big heart and strong connection to his fans and music. A monarch butterfly sits on his shoulder, another symbol of Jackson's metamorphosis as a singer and entertainer, as well as a symbol of royalty. His musical history unfolds behind him." The original Sony publicity release of the album cover featured the Prince symbol in a bubble next to the tiger's head, which sparked discussion on the internet as to whether Prince was involved with any of the new songs. The official response from Prince's camp was "No permission was granted", and the symbol was subsequently removed from the cover on all official Sony websites.

== Promotion and singles ==
"Breaking News" was the first song from the album to be unveiled. On November 5, 2010, a video teaser for the song was released on Jackson's official website. It opens with a montage of various television journalists reporting breaking news about Jackson, followed by the musical introduction of a song. The montage refers to the tabloid stories and legal troubles that plagued Jackson in the years leading up to his death. On November 8, the full length version of the song was released, and made available on MichaelJackson.com for one week.

The album's first single, "Hold My Hand", was released on November 15. The filming of the official video began on Saturday, November 20, in Tustin, California. A casting call was posted on Jackson's official website, stating that the filmmakers were "looking for his fans of all ages who want to be a part of this iconic event." On November 30, the final version of "Much Too Soon" was unveiled, and it was announced that the song would be streaming on iTunes Ping for one week. On December 3, talk show host and comedian Ellen DeGeneres premiered the song "Hollywood Tonight" on The Ellen DeGeneres Show. On December 6, talk show host Oprah Winfrey premiered "Keep Your Head Up" and "Monster" on The Oprah Winfrey Show. On December 7, the final version of "(I Can't Make It) Another Day" was unveiled on iTunes Ping for one week.

On December 8, the entire Michael album was released on Jackson's official website for preview. On Friday, December 10, a 29,070-square-foot (2,701 m^{2}) poster depicting the Michael album artwork was erected at the Rectory Farm in Middlesex, England which broke a Guinness world record for the largest poster in the world, making it Jackson's fourth entry in Guinness World Records and the first record he broke posthumously. The poster, made of PVC and weighing one ton, took engineers three hours to install and was located less than 3,000 meters from one of Heathrow airport's main runways, making it viewable by all planes arriving and departing. The poster stayed at that location until December 23, after which it traveled via sea-container into continental Europe, where it was toured and displayed. Sony Music had a listening party for the album at Roseland Ballroom on December 13.

"Hollywood Tonight" was the album's second official single, released in Italy on February 11, 2011 and in Poland on February 14. The third single, "Behind the Mask", was released in France on February 21. The fourth and final single, "(I Like) The Way You Love Me", was released as a digital single in South Korea on January 18 and was formally released to Italian and Chinese radio stations in July 2011.

== Controversies ==
=== Authenticity of vocals on three tracks ===
The authenticity of the vocals on the tracks "Breaking News", "Keep Your Head Up", and "Monster" is disputed. The tracks, along with nine other unreleased songs leaked online ("Stay", "All Right" (a.k.a. "Everything's Just Fine"), "Black Widow", "Burn Tonight", "All I Need", "Water", "Fall in Love", "Ready 2 Win", and "Soldier Boy"), are known as the Cascio tracks. They are attributed to Jackson, Eddie Cascio and James Porte and were allegedly recorded in the Cascios' basement in 2007, according to the documentary detailing the making of the album. "Stay", "All I Need", and "Burn Tonight", were at one point considered for the album and mixed by Teddy Riley in 2010. Doubts over whether the vocals were by Jackson have been raised by his mother Katherine Jackson, his children Prince and Paris, his sister La Toya, his nephews T.J., Taj, and Taryll, music producer will.i.am, and fans. Jackson's brother Randy Jackson claimed that family members were not allowed at his studio where the album was being completed. According to Randy, when Riley played him some of the tracks, "I immediately said it wasn't his voice".

"@lmSoBlue Dude if you don't leave me the funk alone about this bullish. Funk off ninja...I didn't do the funking song I just mixed it. My work speak for itself. Now go to the funking Cascios. I'm sure they got a twitter. That goes for all of you. I was giving a problem that involved my bestfriend and sign a contract to remix what I had. It was too late for me to turn back so I finished out the project. Now if you want me to apologize for that, yes I'm funkin sorry I did it. Now leave me the hell alone. Ok!!!"

— TwitLonger message from Teddy Riley from August 31, 2013 after being repeatedly questioned about the Cascio tracks.

Before the premiere of "Breaking News", Sony Music Group stated it had "complete confidence in the results of our extensive research, as well as the accounts of those who were in the studio with Michael, that the vocals on the new album are his own". Producer Riley, Frank DiLeo and Jackson's estate defended Sony's claims that the song is authentic. On December 6, 2010, the Cascio family appeared on Oprah, where Eddie Cascio insisted the songs were sung by Jackson, and showed the studio where he had allegedly recorded the songs. Riley, who had worked on "Monster" and "Breaking News", said that the confusion had come about as a product of processing Jackson's vocals using software such as Melodyne. In September 2013, almost three years after the album release, Riley wrote on Twitter that his participation in the project had been "set up". In a September 2022 interview, Riley said that he believed that the Cascio tracks were not sung by Jackson, adding that he was "influenced and pushed to say the things that were said".

Fans have suggested that Italian-American R&B singer Jason Malachi recorded vocals for the tracks, but this was denied by the Jackson estate's lawyer. On January 16, 2011, a statement appeared on Malachi's Facebook page "confessing" to recording the vocals and apologizing to Jackson's fans; however, Malachi later claimed on MySpace that his Facebook and website had been hacked. Malachi's manager Thad Nauden stated that "someone created a phony Facebook page in Jason's name. Jason wants everyone to know beyond a shadow of a doubt, he did not sing a single note on the album". Nauden later retracted the claim that the Facebook account was not Malachi's, but maintained that Malachi was not involved in the Michael album.

On June 12, 2014, a consumer who had purchased Michael filed a class-action lawsuit against Sony Music, the Jackson Estate, MJJ Productions, Cascio and Porte for violation of consumer laws, unfair competition and fraud. The complaint was based on an expert report prepared by forensic phonetician Dr. George Papcun that contested the authenticity of the vocals. According to the lawsuit, the report had been peer-reviewed and supported by a second well-credentialed independent audio expert. Sony, the Estate, Cascio and Porte raised First Amendment defense, claiming that regardless of the songs' authenticity, they had a constitutional right to attribute them to Jackson. On June 30, 2016, the judge refused to grant the defendants' motion and ordered that the case proceeded to class certification. On August 23, 2018, some sources reported that Sony had admitted in court that the vocals on the Cascio songs were not performed by Jackson. The next day, Sony lawyer Zia Modabber dismissed the reports, stating that "no one has conceded that Michael Jackson did not sing on the songs".

On June 29, 2022, a spokesperson for Jackson's website reported that the three tracks would no longer be available on YouTube, Apple Music or Spotify, stating, "The Estate and Sony Music believe the continuing conversation about the tracks is distracting the fan community and casual Michael Jackson listeners from focusing their attention where it should be — on Michael's legendary and deep music catalog." On September 9, 2022, a CD reissue of the album was released that also removed these three tracks.

On September 27, 2024, journalist Damien Shields released a 13-part podcast series called Faking Michael that looks into the alleged fraud and authenticity of the Cascio tracks. The podcast features interviews with members of the Jackson family, Jackson's closest music collaborators, record label executives, and forensic music experts.

=== Dave Grohl's album credit ===
The album credits Dave Grohl with playing drums on the song "(I Can't Make It) Another Day". Grohl confirmed that he had recorded for the track but said he was not contacted afterwards and that he does not appear on the album. The drums on the finished song were actually played by Lenny Kravitz.

== Critical reception ==
Professional ratings
Aggregate scores
Source	Rating
Metacritic	54/100
Review scores
Source	Rating
AllMusic	2.5/5 stars
Chicago Tribune	2/4 stars
Entertainment Weekly	B
The Guardian	2/5 stars
Los Angeles Times	2.5/4 stars
NME	5/10
Rolling Stone	3/5 stars
Slant Magazine	3/5 stars
Spin	6/10

Michael received mixed reviews from most music critics. At Metacritic, which assigns a normalized rating out of 100 to reviews from mainstream critics, the album received an average score of 54, based on 19 reviews, which indicates "mixed or average reviews". Despite media skepticism and some dissent within Jackson family ranks, reviews largely found Michael better than expected. Joseph Vogel of The Huffington Post stated that "the bottom line is this: Michael contains some very impressive new material" and "His habits, his obsessions, his versatility, and his genius are on display at every turn. Who else could move so seamlessly from social anthem to floor burner, fleet hip hop to cosmic rock, vintage funk to poignant folk ballad?"

Dan Martin of NME called the album "kind of enjoyable" but commented that "if this decent-enough album is the best of the bunch, things are going to get ugly from here on in". Neil McCormick of The Telegraph called the album "a fine album" and stated that "It is certainly a great deal better than anyone had any right to expect. Jackson is finally about to get the comeback he craved." Jody Rosen of Rolling Stone thought the album was "not a Michael Jackson album", and Jackson "would not have released anything like this compilation, a grab bag of outtakes and outlines," but "it's a testament to the man's charisma that Michael can be compelling." Leah Greenblatt of Entertainment Weekly called it "certainly no great affront to his name", while The New York Times said it was a "miscellany of familiar Jackson offerings: inspirational, loving, resentful and paranoid."

Kitty Empire in The Observer said Jackson sounded "paler, more emaciated, more effects-laden" than on his classic songs, such as "Billie Jean". She characterized the album as a "hotchpotch of odds and sods that often make plain their co-authors" but singled out the "breezy" and "carefree" "(I Like) The Way That You Love Me" and the "pugnacious" "Hollywood Tonight" for praise. The Reno Gazette-Journal gave the album 3 stars out of 4, while the Toronto Sun gave it 3 stars out of 5. Nima Baniamer of Contactmusic.com gave the album 4 stars out of 5 and stated that Jackson still seemed to hold the capability to effortlessly transgress music genres. Baniamer also commented, "It wouldn't be a decent Jackson record if it wasn't surrounded by controversy. 'Breaking News' is a great track that touches upon the media's obsession with the pop icon; ironically a track further surrounded by dispute as fans have claimed that it may not even be Jackson's own voice on the track."

== Commercial performance ==
The album was released by Epic Records and Sony Music Entertainment. In the United States, Michael debuted at number three on the Billboard 200 with first-week sales of 228,000 copies, followed by 150,000 the next week, but in subsequent weeks, its total sales had shrunk to 27,000 units, 18,000 units and then 11,000 units for the week ending on January 16, 2011. The album debuted at number five in France, with first-week sales of 26,689 copies. In Germany, Michael was the biggest debut of the year, selling 85,000 copies in its first week. The album also debuted at number one in Austria, Italy, the Netherlands, and Sweden. In Denmark, the album debuted at number four, selling 4,936 copies in its first week. On December 19, 2010, the album opened in the United Kingdom at number four with sales of 113,000, which was Jackson's biggest opening sales week in the United Kingdom since the release of Dangerous nearly 20 years before. In its first five weeks, the album sold over 434,000 copies in the United States but failed to match sales of the previous year's soundtrack album Michael Jackson's This Is It, which sold 890,000 copies in five weeks. In the same week, the album was certified platinum by the RIAA for shipping over a million copies.

Michael received numerous gold and platinum certifications worldwide.

== Track listing ==
Michael – 2010 edition (with three inauthentic tracks)
No.	Title	Writer(s)	Producer(s)	Length
1.	"Hold My Hand" (with Akon) (recorded in 2007)	Aliaune Thiam; Giorgio Tuinfort; Claude Kelly	Akon; Tuinfort; Michael Jackson^{[a]}	3:33
2.	"Hollywood Tonight" (spoken bridge by Taryll Jackson) (recorded in 1999–2000 during the Invincible sessions and later through 2007–2008)	M. Jackson; Brad Buxer; Teddy Riley (spoken bridge)	M. Jackson; Riley; Theron "Neff-U" Feemster^{[a]}	4:30
3.	"Keep Your Head Up"	M. Jackson; Eddie "Angelikson" Cascio; James Porte	M. Jackson; Christopher "Tricky" Stewart; Angelikson	4:51
4.	"(I Like) The Way You Love Me" (recorded in 1998–2004 during and after the Invincible sessions and later from 2007–2008)	M. Jackson	M. Jackson; Neff-U	4:34
5.	"Monster" (featuring 50 Cent)	M. Jackson; Cascio; Porte; Curtis "50 Cent" Jackson (rap)	M. Jackson; Riley; Angelikson	5:05
6.	"Best of Joy" (recorded in 2008)	M. Jackson	M. Jackson; Neff-U; Buxer^{[a]}	3:02
7.	"Breaking News"	M. Jackson; Cascio; Porte	M. Jackson; Riley; Angelikson	4:14
8.	"(I Can't Make It) Another Day" (featuring Lenny Kravitz) (recorded in 1999–2001 during the Invincible sessions)	Lenny Kravitz	Kravitz; M. Jackson^{[a]}	3:55
9.	"Behind the Mask" (recorded in 1982 during the Thriller sessions)	M. Jackson; Chris Mosdell; Ryuichi Sakamoto	M. Jackson; John McClain	5:02
10.	"Much Too Soon" (recorded in 1994 during the HIStory sessions)	M. Jackson	M. Jackson; McClain	2:48
Total length:				41:34

Michael – 2022 edition (canonical in discography)
No.	Title	Writer(s)	Producer(s)	Length
1.	"Hold My Hand" (with Akon) (recorded in 2007)	Aliaune Thiam; Giorgio Tuinfort; Claude Kelly	Akon; Tuinfort; Michael Jackson^{[a]}	3:33
2.	"Hollywood Tonight" (spoken bridge by Taryll Jackson) (recorded in 1999–2000 during the Invincible sessions and later through 2007–2008)	M. Jackson; Brad Buxer; Teddy Riley (spoken bridge)	M. Jackson; Riley; Theron "Neff-U" Feemster^{[a]}	4:30
3.	"(I Like) The Way You Love Me" (recorded in 1998–2004 during and after the Invincible sessions and later from 2007–2008)	M. Jackson	M. Jackson; Neff-U	4:34
4.	"Best of Joy" (recorded in 2008)	M. Jackson	M. Jackson; Neff-U; Buxer^{[a]}	3:02
5.	"(I Can't Make It) Another Day" (featuring Lenny Kravitz) (recorded in 1999–2001 during the Invincible sessions)	Lenny Kravitz	Kravitz; M. Jackson^{[a]}	3:55
6.	"Behind the Mask" (recorded in 1982 during the Thriller sessions)	M. Jackson; Chris Mosdell; Ryuichi Sakamoto	M. Jackson; John McClain	5:02
7.	"Much Too Soon" (recorded in 1994 during the HIStory sessions)	M. Jackson	M. Jackson; McClain	2:48
Total length:				27:24

Notes

- ^{^[a]} signifies co-producer
- "(I Like) The Way You Love Me" was released in its early version on The Ultimate Collection (2004) with the title "The Way You Love Me".
- "Behind the Mask" samples a recording of the song of the same name, as performed by the Yellow Magic Orchestra.

== Personnel ==
Credits adapted from Michael album liner notes (2010 edition).

- Michael Jackson – lead vocals (tracks 1, 2, 4, 6, 8, 9, 10), arranger, background vocals (tracks 8, 9), conductor, guitar (track 9), programming
- Kory Aaron – music recording assistant (track 1)
- Alex Alvarez – bass (track 9), additional music programming (8), studio technician (8)
- Christopher Austopchuk – creative director
- Eelco Bakker – music recording assistant (track 1)
- Dave Baron – drum machine, noise, synthesizer programming (track 8)
- Charlie Bisharat – concert master (track 10)
- Edward Brown – keyboards (track 2)
- Brad Buxer – producer (track 6)
- David Campbell – music arranger, conductor (track 10)
- William C. Champlin – piano (track 4)
- Paulinho da Costa – percussion (tracks 4, 9)
- Thomas Drayton – bass (track 4)
- Scott Elgin – recording engineer (tracks 5, 7, instrumental: 2), audio mixing (2)
- Tommy Emmanuel – guitar (track 10)
- Theron "Neff-U" Feemster – producer (tracks 2, 4, 6), drum machine (4), all other instruments (6), keyboards (2, 4)
- Şerban Ghenea – audio mixing (tracks 1, 4, 6)
- Quentinn Gilkey – assistant recording engineer (tracks 5, 7, instrumental: 2)
- Khaliq Glover – recording engineer (tracks 5, 7, 9), audio mixing (9)
- Mark "Exit" Goodchild – recording engineer (track 1)
- Dave Grohl – drums (track 8)
- John Hanes – audio mixing (tracks 4, 6)
- Henry Hirsch – Michael Jackson's vocal recording engineer (track 8)
- Jean-Marie Horvat – audio mixing (tracks 2, 5, 7)
- Eric Jackson – guitar (track 2)
- Taryll Jackson – spoken word voices (track 2)
- Craig Johnson – archivist
- Alphonso Jones – additional background vocals (track 9)
- Suzie Katayama – accordion, music contractor (track 10)
- Lenny Kravitz – lead vocals, background vocals, producer, bass, drum machine, electric guitar, gong, horn samples, mini moog, audio mixing, noise, string samples, timpani (track 8)
- Dennis Krijnen – orchestra recording assistant (track 1)
- Sheri Lee – art direction, creative director, design
- John McClain – producer (tracks 9, 10)
- Danny Ray McDonald Jr. – human whistle (track 2)
- Vlado Meller – mastering
- Mischke – additional background vocals, vocal recording engineer (tracks 2, 6)
- Tommy Morgan – harmonica (track 10)
- James Murray – instrumental recording engineer (tracks 2, 4, 6)
- Kadir Nelson – cover art
- Jon Nettlesbey – digital editing (track 9), drum machine (9), recording engineer (2, 9), additional keyboards (9), audio mixing (9), sequencing (9)
- Wessel Oltheten – orchestra recording engineer (track 1)
- Matt Paul – music recording assistant (track 1)
- Greg Phillinganes – additional keyboards
  (track 9)
- Mike Phillips – saxophone (track 9)
- Justin Pintar – music recording assistant
  (track 1)
- Michael Durham Prince – archivist, instrumental recording engineer (track 2), human whistle (2), vocal recording engineer (2, 4, 6)
- The Regiment – horn section (track 2)
- Teddy Riley – producer (tracks 2, 5, 7), audio mixing (2, 5, 7), music programming (2, 5, 7)
- Tim Roberts – audio mixing assistant (tracks 4, 6)
- Christina Rodriguez – art direction, design
- Craig Ross – 12 string electric guitar (track 8)
- Mark Santangelo – mastering assistant
- Miguel Scott – music recording assistant (track 1)
- Allen Sides – recording engineer (track 9), audio mixing (10)
- Leon F. Sylvers III – background vocal arrangement (track 9)
- Evvy Tavasci – archivist
- Aliaune "Akon" Thiam – lead vocals, producer, all other instruments, music programming (track 1)
- Giorgio Tuinfort – producer, all other instruments, music programming (track 1)
- Franck Van Der Heijden – string arrangements (track 1)
- Erick Donell Walls – guitar (tracks 2, 4, 6)
- Ryan Wiese – music recording assistant (track 1)
- Shanice Wilson – additional background vocals (track 9)
- Mack Woodward – music recording assistant (track 1)
- Big Jim Wright – drum machine, keyboards (track 9)

Cascio tracks only contributions

- Rudy Bird – musician (tracks 3, 5)
- Stuart Brawley – assistant recording engineer (track 3, rap: 5), recording engineer (7), musician (3, 5, 7), talking voice talent (7)
- Eddie Cascio – producer, musician (tracks 3, 5, 7)
- Myron Chandler – talking voiceover recording engineer (track 7)
- Joe Corcoran – assistant recording engineer (track 3, rap: 5), drum machine (3, 5, 7), recording engineer (7), musician (3, 5, 7)
- Brandon Datoli – assistant string section recording engineer (track 7)
- Steven Dennis – assistant recording engineer (track 3)
- Reggie Dozer – string section recording engineer (track 7)
- Nicole Garcia – musician (track 3)
- Jesus Garnica – audio mixing assistant (track 3)
- Dave Hampton – talking voiceover recording engineer (track 7)
- Travis Harrington – assistant recording engineer (track 3)
- Drew Harris – assistant recording engineer
  (track 3, rap: 5), recording engineer (7)
- Sean Hurley – musician (track 3)
- Curtis "50 Cent" Jackson – rap vocals (track 5)
- Sharon Jackson – musician (track 5)
- Jaycen Joshua – audio mixing (track 3)
- Michael LeFevre – vocal producer, talking voice talent (track 7)
- Jason Malachi – lead vocals (tracks 3, 5, 7)
- Glen Marchese – assistant recording engineer (rap: track 5), recording engineer (7)
- Naiden Maynard – screaming voices (track 5)
- Nigel Maynard – screaming voices (track 5)
- Stacey Michaels – talking voice talent (track 7)
- Luis Navarro – recording engineer (track 5)
- Monty Neuble – musician (track 3)
- Lisa Orkin – talking voice talent (track 7)
- Sandy Orkin – talking voice talent (track 7)
- Orianthi Panagaris – guitar, musician (track 5)
- James Porte – background vocals (tracks 3, 5, 7), drum machine (3, 5, 7), musician (3, 7)
- Zachariah Redding – 50 Cent's rap vocal recording assistant (track 5)
- Jason Sherwood – assistant recording engineer (track 3)
- Duane Starling – additional background vocals (track 3)
- Christopher "Tricky" Stewart – producer (track 3)
- Cameron Stone – musician (tracks 3, 5)
- Brian "B-Luv" Thomas – recording engineer (track 3)
- Jamie Wollam – musician (track 3)
- Benjamin Wright – string section arranger, strings conductor (track 7)
- The Benjamin Wright Orchestra – string section (track 7)
- Andrew Wuepper – recording engineer (track 3)

== Charts ==
=== Weekly charts ===
Weekly chart performance for Michael
Chart (2010–2011)	Peak position
Australian Albums (ARIA)	10
Austrian Albums (Ö3 Austria)	1
Belgian Albums (Ultratop Flanders)	4
Belgian Albums (Ultratop Wallonia)	3
Canadian Albums (Billboard)	2
Czech Albums (ČNS IFPI)	5
Danish Albums (Hitlisten)	4
Dutch Albums (Album Top 100)	1
Finnish Albums (Suomen virallinen lista)	9
French Albums (SNEP)	4
German Albums (Offizielle Top 100)	1
Greek International Albums (IFPI)	7
Hungarian Albums (MAHASZ)	9
Irish Albums (IRMA)	18
Italian Albums (FIMI)	1
Japanese Albums (Oricon)	3
Mexican Albums (Top 100 Mexico)	20
New Zealand Albums (RMNZ)	10
Norwegian Albums (VG-lista)	4
Polish Albums (ZPAV)	3
Portuguese Albums (AFP)	15
Scottish Albums (Official Charts)	14
South Korean Albums (Gaon)	2
Spanish Albums (Promusicae)	2
Swedish Albums (Sverigetopplistan)	1
Swiss Albums (Schweizer Hitparade)	2
UK Albums (Official Charts)	4
US Billboard 200	3
US Top R&B/Hip-Hop Albums (Billboard)	1

Chart (2026)	Peak position
Croatian International Albums (HDU)	28

=== Year-end charts ===
2010 year-end chart performance for Michael
Chart (2010)	Position
Australian Albums (ARIA)	84
Danish Albums (Hitlisten)	13
Dutch Albums (MegaCharts)	73
Finnish Albums (Suomen virallinen lista)	25
French Albums (SNEP)	30
German Albums (Offizielle Top 100)	25
Hungarian Albums (MAHASZ)	60
Italian Albums (FIMI)	11
Polish Albums (ZPAV)	39
Spanish Albums (PROMUSICAE)	20
Swedish Albums (Sverigetopplistan)	25
Swiss Albums (Schweizer Hitparade)	85
UK Albums (OCC)	59

2011 year-end chart performance for Michael
Chart (2011)	Position
Austrian Albums (Ö3 Austria)	36
Belgian Albums (Ultratop Flanders)	56
Belgian Albums (Ultratop Wallonia)	31
Canadian Albums (Billboard)	39
French Albums (SNEP)	169
Japanese Albums (Oricon)	50
Spanish Albums (PROMUSICAE)	30
Swiss Albums (Schweizer Hitparade)	54
US Billboard 200	54
US Top R&B/Hip-Hop Albums (Billboard)	14

== Certifications ==
Certifications and sales for Michael
Region	Certification	Certified units/sales
Australia (ARIA)	Gold	35,000^{^}
Austria (IFPI Austria)	Platinum	20,000^{*}
Belgium (BRMA)	Platinum	30,000^{*}
Canada (Music Canada)	Platinum	80,000^{^}
Denmark (IFPI Danmark)	Platinum	30,000^{^}
Finland (Musiikkituottajat)	Gold	14,928
France (SNEP)	2× Platinum	200,000^{*}
Germany (BVMI)	Platinum	200,000^{‡}
Hungary (MAHASZ)	Gold	3,000^{^}
Ireland (IRMA)	Gold	7,500^{^}
Italy (FIMI)	2× Platinum	120,000^{*}
Japan (RIAJ)	Gold	100,000^{^}
Netherlands (NVPI)	Gold	25,000^{^}
New Zealand (RMNZ)	Gold	7,500^{^}
Poland (ZPAV)	Platinum	20,000^{*}
Portugal (AFP)	Gold	10,000^{^}
Russia (NFPF)	2× Platinum	20,000^{*}
Spain (Promusicae)	Platinum	60,000^{^}
Sweden (GLF)	Gold	20,000^{‡}
Taiwan	—	15,000
United Kingdom (BPI)	Platinum	300,000^{^}
United States (RIAA)	Platinum	1,000,000^{^}
Summaries
Europe (IFPI)	Platinum	1,000,000^{*}
^{*} Sales figures based on certification alone.^{^} Shipments figures based on certification alone.^{‡} Sales+streaming figures based on certification alone.

== Release history ==
List of release dates, showing country or region, record label, and format
Region	Date	Label	Format
Australia	December 10, 2010	Sony Music	CD
Austria	December 10, 2010	Sony Music	CD
Belgium	December 10, 2010	Sony Music	CD
Argentina	December 10, 2010	Sony Music	CD
Sweden	December 10, 2010	Sony Music	CD
United Kingdom	December 13, 2010	Sony Music	CD
Philippines	December 14, 2010	Sony Music	CD
Taiwan	December 14, 2010	Sony Music	CD
United States	December 14, 2010	Epic	CD; digital download
Colombia	December 14, 2010	Sony Music	CD
Brazil	December 14, 2010	Sony Music	CD
Japan	December 15, 2010	Sony Music Japan	CD
China	December 24, 2010	Sony Music China	CD
China	January 14, 2011	Sony Music China	Digital download

== See also ==
- List of unreleased songs recorded by Michael Jackson
- List of music released posthumously
