= Ashaye =

British singer

ASHAYE
- Also known as: Trevor Julian Ashaye
- Origin: United Kingdom
- Labels: The Numero Group, V4 Visions, Strictly Rhythm Records, Record Shack

Ashaye, popularly known as Trevor Julian Ashaye, is a British singer. His single "Michael Jackson Medley" entered the UK Singles Chart on 15 October 1983 and was in the chart for three weeks, peaking at number 45.

Ashaye started his music career managed by Steve Walsh in a group called Earthline Connection. He signed up with R&B Records to release "Michael Jackson Medley" in 1983 which reached the national charts.
