= Hollywood Tonight =

Single by Michael Jackson

from the album Michael
- Released: February 11, 2011
- Recorded: 1999–2008 (vocals); 2010 (additional music overdubs and mixing)
- Genre: R&B; hip hop
- Length: 4:31
- Label: Epic
- Songwriters: Michael Jackson; Brad Buxer and; Teddy Riley credited for writing (spoken bridge)
- Producers: Michael Jackson (original version); Teddy Riley; Theron "Neff-U" Feemster (co-producer 2010 version)

Michael Jackson singles chronology
"Hold My Hand" (2010)	"Hollywood Tonight" (2011)	"Behind the Mask" (2011)

Music video
- "Hollywood Tonight" on YouTube

Audio sample
- file; help

"Hollywood Tonight" is a song by American singer-songwriter Michael Jackson, included on his posthumous album, Michael. The song was released by Epic Records on February 11, 2011, as the second single from Michael. The spoken parts were performed by Jackson's nephew, Taryll Jackson and written by Teddy Riley. An accompanying music video was released on March 10, 2011. It features Algerian dancer Sofia Boutella dressed in a Jackson-inspired outfit performing a routine with 60 dancers.

== Background and release ==
The song was written by Michael Jackson during the time of the Invincible album. Michael pulled the track out of the archives in 2007 to work on the song with producer Theron "Neff-U" Feemster. Jackson first put down a sketch of the lyrics in 1999, then he began working out the music with longtime friend and collaborator, Brad Buxer, who co-wrote the song. Over the next ten years, Jackson returned to the track numerous times. Jackson and Brad Buxer continued tinkering with it in Las Vegas in 2007. In October 2008, when Jackson lived in Los Angeles, he asked recording engineer Michael Prince to put the latest mix of the song on CD so he could listen to it and see what might be improved, but he never got around to working on it again. Teddy Riley co-produced the song along with Theron "Neff-U" Feemster following Jackson's death. Riley also wrote a new bridge, performed by Taryll Jackson, that included different lyrics from those left by Jackson.

On December 3, 2010, before the album Michael's release, the song premiered on The Ellen DeGeneres Show. The song was first released as a single to radio stations in Italy, on February 11, 2011, and it was first listed on BBC Radio 2's playlist A one-day later. In Poland, the song was released on February 14, 2011. A later announcement from the official Jackson website stated that "Behind the Mask" would be released as a radio single in the United States, Canada, Japan and France, with "Hollywood Tonight" taking its place for the rest of the world. Despite this, "Hollywood Tonight" was released to urban contemporary and adult contemporary radio stations in the US on April 5, 2011.

== Reception ==
"Hollywood Tonight" (Throwback mix)
A 37-second sample of Jackson's song "Hollywood Tonight" (Throwback mix). This remix is similar to the arrangement of the album version mix, and uses the beats of "Billie Jean" to give it more dance style.

The song received generally positive reviews from music critics. Teddy Riley, the producer said, "I was looking at just doing the next level of 'Billie Jean' meets 'Dangerous' or 'Leave Me Alone'. It's like one of those driving bass lines that you will remember." Joe Vogel of The Huffington Post stated that the song was "definitely an album highlight. The song begins with a haunting Gothic church choir, before transforming into an energetic dance stomper", and that the track "features Michael in a notably deeper voice, and concludes with military-style whistling." Leah Greenblatt of Entertainment Weekly said the song "feels leaner and more urgent, crackling with Jackson's trademark percussive shuffle and pop." Dan Martin of NME called the album Michael "not as terrible as you may think", and "the worst thing you can say about 'Hollywood Tonight' is that its catchy signature gets annoying after a while." Jason Lipshutz, Gail Mitchell and Gary Graff from Billboard thought the song "sounds like Britney Spears' 'Lucky' crossed with Justin Timberlake's 'LoveStoned'." Neil McCormick of Daily Telegraph said, "it has the extraordinary confidence of a pop classic and presages an album that may well be Jackson's best work since his Eighties glory days." Jim Farber of the Daily News praised "Hollywood Tonight" for exhibiting Jackson's "old verve." Gerard McGarry of Shout! Music Magazine stated that "while this single doesn't quite touch on the greatness of classic Jackson tracks, it does recall that infectious disco groove that used to be his trademark. There's a strong 80's vibe to 'Hollywood Tonight'—even the female dancer in the video looks like a young Brooke Shields, who Michael was linked to in the 80's."

Negative review comes from Carl Cortez of Assignment X for the "throwback mix" on 7-inch single and music video, he said the mix is "a little sharper than the original, but again, the song really isn't all that good. Another previously unreleased B-side or even the original demo might have been more interesting."

== Chart performance ==
"Hollywood Tonight" was released as the second single from the album, Michael, in most territories. Due to the massive airplay on BBC Radio 2 in the United Kingdom, the song debuted at number 38 on The UK Radio Airplay Chart on Week 7, 2011 (from February 13 to February 19, 2011), and peaked at number 35 on Week 8, 2011 (from February 20 to February 26, 2011).

In the United States, the song debuted at number 89 on the Billboard Hot R&B/Hip-Hop Songs chart for the week ending April 16, 2011, marking Jackson's 52nd solo hit on this chart, and peaked at number 60. It debuted at number 36 on the Billboard Hot Dance Club Songs chart for the week ending April 30, 2011, and on June 11, 2011, it became Jackson's first number-one hit on the chart since his 1995 hit "Scream" and his 13th overall as a solo artist.

== Music video ==
Jackson's official website announced a music video for Hollywood Tonight. While expected originally to be released at the end of February, it was later pushed back to March 10, 2011. A 19-second sneak preview of the video was made available on Jackson's official Facebook page. On March 10, as expected the full video was released with a new mix called "Throwback Mix", featuring alternate demo vocals without autotune, sampling the beat of "Billie Jean" and removing the word bridge spoken by Taryll Jackson.

The video was directed by Wayne Isham, who previously directed the video for Jackson's 1995 number-one hit "You Are Not Alone". It was shot in front of the Pantages Theatre in Hollywood, California.

The lead dancer in the video is Sofia Boutella, who wears an outfit inspired by Jackson's stage costumes. More than 60 dancers performed a Jackson-inspired routine as seen in a video posted by TMZ. The video revolves around a young woman arriving in Hollywood, vying to become a known dancer. It also includes images of Jackson from the music videos for "Black or White", "Billie Jean", "Jam", "Don't Stop 'Til You Get Enough" and "In the Closet".

== Michael Jackson: The Experience ==
Hollywood Tonight is a playable song in the PlayStation Vita, Nintendo 3DS and iOS versions of Michael Jackson: The Experience.

== Track listing ==
Korean CD maxi single (S10988C) / EU digital EP
No.	Title	Length
1.	"Hollywood Tonight" (Throwback mix)	3:46
2.	"Hollywood Tonight" (DJ Chuckie radio edit)	3:54
3.	"Hollywood Tonight" (DJ Chuckie remix)	6:02
4.	"Hollywood Tonight" (radio edit)	3:46
Total length:		16:48

EU 7" single (34-788083 / 88697880837)
No.	Title	Length
1.	"Hollywood Tonight" (Throwback mix)	3:46
2.	"Behind the Mask" (radio edit)	3:36
Total length:		7:22

EU CD single Epic 88697902982 (Sony) / EAN 0886979029828
No.	Title	Length
2.	"Hollywood Tonight" (Throwback mix)	3:48
3.	"Hollywood Tonight" (DJ Chuckie remix)	5:58
Total length:		6:06

== Official versions ==
- Album version – 4:31
- Radio edit – 3:46
- Demo – 5:26
- Throwback mix – 3:46
- Throwback mix with intro (video mix) – 3:59
- Throwback instrumental – 3:59
- Throwback instrumental—no beatbox – 4:00
- DJ Chuckie remix – 6:01
- DJ Chuckie remix—no talk – 6:01
- DJ Chuckie radio edit – 3:53
- DJ Chuckie dub – 5:00
- Jody Den Broeder extended vocal mix – 6:53
- Jody Den Broeder dub – 6:53
- Jody Den Broeder radio edit – 3:51
- Yiannis Walk of Fame mix – 7:11
- Yiannis Walk of Fame dub – 7:07
- Theron "Neff-U" Feemster mix – 4:09
- Recall 3 main – 4:29
- Recall 3 background vocals down – 4:29
- Recall 3 instrumental – 4:29
- Recall 3 a capella – 3:53

== Charts ==
=== Weekly charts ===
Weekly chart performance for "Hollywood Tonight"
Chart (2011)	Peak position
Germany (GfK)	55
Italy (Musica e Dischi)	26
Poland (Dance Top 50)	19
UK Singles (OCC)	152
US Dance Club Songs (Billboard)	1
US Hot R&B/Hip-Hop Songs (Billboard)	60

=== Year-end charts ===
Year-end chart performance for "Hollywood Tonight"
Chart (2011)	Position
US Hot Dance Club Songs (Billboard)	30

== Release history ==
Release dates and formats for "Hollywood Tonight"
Region	Date	Format(s)	Ref.
Italy	April 8, 2011	Digital single	
Italy	February 11, 2011	Radio airplay; digital download	
United Kingdom	February 11, 2011	CD single; radio airplay	
United Kingdom	April 10, 2011	Digital single	
United Kingdom	April 16, 2011	7" single	
United Kingdom	April 26, 2011	CD single	
Poland	February 14, 2011	Radio airplay; digital download	
Spain	March 8, 2011	Radio airplay; digital download	
China	March 22, 2011	Radio airplay; digital download	
Sweden	March 10, 2011	Radio airplay; digital download	
Korea	March 10, 2011	Radio airplay; digital download	
Korea	March 31, 2011	CD single	
United States	April 5, 2011	Urban airplay	
Germany	April 8, 2011	Digital single	
Germany	April 15, 2011	CD single	

== Personnel ==
- Originally written and composed by Michael Jackson
- Soprano voice by Michael Jackson
- Updated version writers: Brad Buxer, Teddy Riley
- Spoken bridge written by Teddy Riley
- Produced by Teddy Riley and Michael Jackson
- Co-produced by Theron "Neff-U" Feemster and Brad Buxer
- Arrangement by Michael Jackson, Teddy Riley and Theron "Neff-U" Feemster
- Mixed by Jean-Marie Horvat, Teddy Riley and Scott Elgin
- Mix engineers: John Hanes assisted by Tim Roberts, Jean Marie Horvat, Teddy Riley, Scott Elgin
- Programming: Teddy Riley
- Additional background vocals: Mischke
- Vocals recorded by Michael Durham Prince and Mischke
- Spoken bridge written by Teddy Riley and Labyron Walton
- Spoken bridge by Taryll Jackson
- Whistling: Danny Ray McDonald Jr. Michael Jackson, and Michael Durham Prince
- Beatbox by Michael Jackson
- Engineered by Scott Elgin, James Murray, Michael Durham Prince and Jon Nettlesbey
- Assistant engineer: Quentinn Gilkey
- Keyboard: Theron "Neff-U" Feemster and Edward Brown
- Guitar: Erick Donell Walls and Eric Jackson
- Guitar engineer: Cristian Delano
- Horns: The Regiment
- Drum programming by Brad Buxer and Theron "Neff-U" Feemster

== See also ==
- List of unreleased songs recorded by Michael Jackson
- Death of Michael Jackson
- List of music released posthumously
- List of number-one dance singles of 2011 (U.S.)
