= Wessel Oltheten =

- Born: 1983
- Occupations: Recording engineer, mix engineer, mastering engineer, author
- Years active: 2004–present
- Website: www.wesseloltheten.nl/nl

Wessel Oltheten is a Dutch recording, mixing and mastering engineer. Artists he worked for include Michael Jackson and David Garrett. In 2018 Wessel published his educational book 'Mixing With Impact'.
