= Breaking News (song) =

Promotional single by Michael Jackson (disputed)

from the album Michael (2010 Edition)
- Released: November 8, 2010
- Recorded: 2007 (basic tracks); 2010 (additional overdubs and mixing)
- Studio: Angelikson Studios (Franklin Lakes, New Jersey)
- Genre: R&B
- Length: 4:14
- Label: Epic
- Songwriters: Michael Jackson; Eddie Cascio; James Porte
- Producers: Michael Jackson; Teddy Riley; Eddie Cascio

"Breaking News" is a song credited to American recording artist Michael Jackson. The song is said to have been written by Jackson, Eddie Cascio and James Porte, produced by Teddy Riley, Cascio and Jackson, and was included on the 2010 edition of his first posthumous album, Michael. Along with "Monster" and "Keep Your Head Up", the song was allegedly recorded in Porte and Cascio's basement in 2007. These tracks have been controversial since their release, with Jackson's fans and family members doubting their authenticity since release. In August 2018, Sony Music Group admitted in court that the vocals of "Breaking News" were not performed by Jackson. In July 2022, the song was removed from streaming services.

The R&B song talks about the media wanting a piece of the pop star, which drew comparisons to Britney Spears' "Piece of Me" (2007). An instrumental snippet of "Breaking News" was unveiled in a promotional video which features a montage of various TV journalists reporting breaking news about Jackson, and refers to the tabloid stories and legal troubles that plagued Jackson in the years leading up to his death. "Breaking News" achieved minor success, peaking at number one on the Billboard Bubbling Under Hot R&B/Hip-Hop Songs.

== Background and release ==
"Breaking News" is said to have been written by Jackson, Eddie Cascio, and James Porte, and produced by Teddy Riley, Cascio, and Jackson. The song was released by Sony Music Entertainment to precede the announcement of Michael. On November 5, 2010, a video teaser for "Breaking News" was released on Jackson's official website. The video opens with a montage of various TV journalists reporting breaking news about Jackson. The musical introduction follows, ending before the vocals start. The video refers to the tabloid stories and legal troubles that affected Jackson in the years leading up to his death. On November 8, "Breaking News" was fully released on Jackson's website and subsequently played on some radio stations.

== Commercial success ==
The song received instant airplay on numerous radio stations on the debut day, as 151 US stations sampled "Breaking News" that day on several formats, from pop and R&B to adult and oldies. A total of 246 plays were recorded on that day, reaching an estimated 2.2 million listeners. Additionally it logged 1.1 million impressions on 52 R&B/Hip-Hop stations after two days of airplay, according to Nielsen BDS. Among all stations monitored by BDS, the song registered 302 plays on 177 stations, amounting to an audience of 2.6 million, since its arrival on November 8, 2010. Drawing a mixed reaction from radio programmers, "Breaking News" bubbled under the Hot R&B/Hip-Hop Songs chart at number one after two days of radio airplay. The song remained on the chart for only one week.

== Critical reception ==
"Breaking News" received mostly negative reviews from music critics. Terri Thomas, program director of radio station KJLH said that although people miss Jackson, the song doesn't compete with his previous material and legacy. Skip Dillard of WBLS mentioned that listeners overall seemed to think that the song sounded unfinished and did represent Jackson's perfectionism in his music. Ashante Infantry of Toronto Star wrote that "Breaking News" risks undermining the goodwill that had surrounded Jackson following his death, describing it as a "self-referential rehash". Infantry also suggested that if future releases follow a similar pattern, there may be a point where audiences lose interest in this type of material.

Darryl Sterdan from QMI Agency commented that the vocals in the verses sounded unnatural, as though they had been taken from another recording and heavily altered in pitch and timing before being layered with excessive production. A review from The Christian Science Monitor observed that "Breaking News" sparked controversy among fans, with reactions split between those who embraced it and others who remained doubtful. Cameron Adams of Herald Sun said the song would have remained unreleased had Jackson not died. Joe Vogel, author of the book Man in the Music: The Creative Life and Work of Michael Jackson, offered a more favorable perspective, stating that despite the criticism, the song's themes and style are consistent with Jackson's signature artistic voice.

== Controversy over authenticity ==
Upon release, the authenticity of "Breaking News" was questioned by Jackson's mother Katherine, as well as his sister La Toya and his nephews T.J., Taj, and Taryll, in addition to many of his fans. According to AFP, the release was quickly overshadowed by doubts about whether the vocals truly belonged to Jackson. Reuters similarly noted that the track ignited renewed debate over the authenticity of the voice. In response, Sony Music Group issued a statement asserting its full confidence in the thorough investigations conducted, along with testimony from individuals present during the recording sessions, maintaining that the vocals featured on the album are indeed Jackson's.

On November 11, 2010, Jackson's estate released a statement asserting that six longtime collaborators—Bruce Swedien, Matt Forger, Stewart Brawley, Michael Prince, Dr. Freeze and Teddy Riley—each confirmed the vocals were unmistakably Jackson's. Sony also stated that Jackson's estate and Epic Records had commissioned two forensic musicologists to conduct waveform analysis, which supported the conclusion that the voice belonged to Jackson. Despite this, Riley later issued an apology on Twitter to a fan, expressing regret for his involvement in "Breaking News" and claiming he had been misled. Meanwhile, Jason Malachi, who had been speculated to be the song's vocalist, denied any participation in the recording. On January 16, 2011, a statement appeared on Malachi's Facebook page to confess that he had sung songs on the album. He later claimed that his website, Myspace, and Facebook had been hacked. Shortly afterward, his manager Thad Nauden claimed to TMZ that the Facebook page was fake and emphasized that Malachi had no involvement whatsoever, insisting he did not perform any vocals on the album.

On August 23, 2018, it was reported that Sony had admitted in court that the vocals on the three Cascio songs were not performed by Jackson and were instead recorded after his death by Malachi, apparently missing the first part of Sony's counsel sentence "[F]or purposes of the argument" which is used in court not to be an admission, but rather a statement of "even if the alleged action happened". However, the following day, Zia Modabber of Sony Music's law firm, Katten Muchin Rosenman, recanted these reports, stating that "no one has conceded that Michael Jackson did not sing on the songs". On July 6, 2022, Jackson's estate and Sony Music removed the song, along with "Monster" and "Keep Your Head Up", from streaming services Spotify and Apple Music amid the allegations that the vocals are not Jackson's. In a 2024 podcast Faking Michael, journalist and fan Damien Shields theorized that the song is a bootleg of "My Prerogative", a 1988 single by Bobby Brown, which Jackson was obsessed with in his final years. The theory is supported by sharing nearly identical themes, lyrics, and melodies.

== Personnel ==
- Written: Michael Jackson, Eddie Cascio and James Porte
- Produced: Teddy Riley, Angelikson and Michael Jackson
- Background vocals: James Porte
- Mixed: Jean-Marie Horvat and Teddy Riley
- Violin: Mark Cargill, Kathleen Robertson, Susan Chatman, Pamela Gates, Lesa Terry, Marisa McCleod, Richard Adkins, Yvette Devereaux, Jennifer Choi and Nicole Garcia
- Viola: Karen Elaine, James "Jimbo" Ross, Cameron Patrick, Darrin McCann and Kaila Potts
- Cello: Miguel Martinez, Peggy Baldwin, Nancy Stein-Ross, Ernest Ehrhardt, Giovanna Moraga Clayton and Stepanie Fife
- Guitars: Joe Corcoran
- "Breaking News" reporter voice: Stuart Brawley
- String session: The Benjamin Wright Orchestra
- Drum programming: James Porte
- Voice talents: Stuart Brawley, Sandy Orkin, Stacey Michaels, Michael Lefevre and Lisa Orkin
- Keyboards: James Porte, Eddie Cascio and Stuart Brawley
- Programming: Teddy Riley
- Arranger and conductor: Benjamin Wright
- Bass: Kevin Brandon and Francis Lui Wu
- Bass: Stuart Brawley and James Porte

== Charts ==
Weekly chart performance for "Breaking News"
Chart (2010)	Peak position
US Billboard Bubbling Under R&B/Hip-Hop Singles	1
