= The Collection (Michael Jackson album) =

Box set by Michael Jackson
- Released: June 29, 2009
- Recorded: 1978–2001
- Length: 319:31
- Labels: Epic; Sony
- Producers: Michael Jackson; Quincy Jones; Teddy Riley; various

Michael Jackson chronology
The Motown Years (2008)	The Collection (2009)	The Stripped Mixes (2009)

The Collection is a compilation box set by American recording artist Michael Jackson. It was released on June 29, 2009, by Epic Records. The album was released four days after his death, though its release was already scheduled before Jackson's passing. With the exception of HIStory, it contains all of Jackson's Epic studio albums. It has peaked at number one in several countries.

This set was originally available, albeit in different packaging, in 2001 as a very rare UK promo set to celebrate the release of Invincible at 34 Westferry Circus in Canary Wharf, London. This compilation also marks the beginning of Jackson's posthumous legacy. The artwork scheme is similar to the King of Pop UK edition album.

== Chart performance ==
The album spent two weeks atop the European Top 100 Albums chart.

== Track listing ==
=== Off the Wall (2001 Special Edition) ===
No.	Title	Writer(s)	Length
1.	"Don't Stop 'Til You Get Enough"	Michael Jackson	6:05
2.	"Rock with You"	Rod Temperton	3:40
3.	"Workin' Day and Night"	Michael Jackson	5:14
4.	"Get on the Floor"	Michael Jackson, Louis Johnson	4:39
5.	"Off the Wall"	Rod Temperton	4:05
6.	"Girlfriend"	Paul McCartney	3:05
7.	"She's Out of My Life"	Tom Bahler	3:37
8.	"I Can't Help It"	Stevie Wonder, Susaye Greene	4:29
9.	"It's the Falling in Love" (featuring Patti Austin)	Carole Bayer Sager, David Foster	3:48
10.	"Burn This Disco Out"	Rod Temperton	3:41
11.	"Quincy Jones Interview #1"		0:37
12.	"Introduction to Don't Stop 'Til You Get Enough Demo"		0:13
13.	"Don't Stop 'Til You Get Enough" (Original Demo from 1978)	Michael Jackson	4:48
14.	"Quincy Jones Interview #2"		0:30
15.	"Introduction to Workin' Day and Night Demo"		0:10
16.	"Workin' Day and Night" (Original Demo from 1978)	Michael Jackson	4:19
17.	"Quincy Jones Interview #3"		0:48
18.	"Rod Temperton Interview"		4:57
19.	"Quincy Jones Interview #4"		1:32

=== Thriller ===
No.	Title	Writer(s)	Length
1.	"Wanna Be Startin' Somethin'"	Michael Jackson	6:01
2.	"Baby Be Mine"	Rod Temperton	4:17
3.	"The Girl Is Mine" (featuring Paul McCartney)	Michael Jackson	3:42
4.	"Thriller"	Rod Temperton	5:57
5.	"Beat It"	Michael Jackson	4:16
6.	"Billie Jean"	Michael Jackson	4:52
7.	"Human Nature"	Steve Porcaro, John Bettis	4:05
8.	"P.Y.T. (Pretty Young Thing)"	James Ingram, Quincy Jones	4:00
9.	"The Lady in My Life"	Rod Temperton	5:00

=== Bad (2001 Special Edition) ===
No.	Title	Writer(s)	Length
1.	"Bad"	Michael Jackson	4:07
2.	"The Way You Make Me Feel"	Michael Jackson	4:57
3.	"Speed Demon"	Michael Jackson	4:01
4.	"Liberian Girl"	Michael Jackson	3:53
5.	"Just Good Friends" (featuring Stevie Wonder)	Terry Britten, Graham Lyle	4:06
6.	"Another Part of Me"	Michael Jackson	3:54
7.	"Man in the Mirror"	Siedah Garrett, Glen Ballard	5:20
8.	"I Just Can't Stop Loving You" (featuring Siedah Garrett)	Michael Jackson	4:11
9.	"Dirty Diana"	Michael Jackson	4:41
10.	"Smooth Criminal"	Michael Jackson	4:17
11.	"Leave Me Alone"	Michael Jackson	4:40
12.	"Quincy Jones Interview #1"		4:03
13.	"Streetwalker"	Michael Jackson	5:49
14.	"Quincy Jones Interview #2"		2:53
15.	"Todo Mi Amor Eres Tú" (featuring Siedah Garrett)	Michael Jackson, Rubén Blades	4:05
16.	"Quincy Jones Interview #3"		2:30
17.	"Spoken Intro to Fly Away"		0:08
18.	"Fly Away"	Michael Jackson	3:26

=== Dangerous (2001 Special Edition) ===
No.	Title	Writer(s)	Length
1.	"Jam"	Michael Jackson, René Moore, Bruce Swedien, Teddy Riley	5:39
2.	"Why You Wanna Trip on Me"	Teddy Riley, Bernard Belle	5:24
3.	"In the Closet" (featuring Princess Stéphanie of Monaco)	Michael Jackson, Teddy Riley	6:31
4.	"She Drives Me Wild" (featuring Wreckx-N-Effect)	Michael Jackson, Teddy Riley; rap lyrics by Aqil Davidson	3:41
5.	"Remember the Time"	Michael Jackson, Teddy Riley, Bernard Belle	4:00
6.	"Can't Let Her Get Away"	Michael Jackson, Teddy Riley	5:00
7.	"Heal the World"	Michael Jackson	6:25
8.	"Black or White" (featuring L.T.B.)	Michael Jackson; rap lyrics by Bill Bottrell	4:15
9.	"Who Is It"	Michael Jackson	6:34
10.	"Give In to Me" (featuring Slash)	Michael Jackson, Bill Bottrell	5:29
11.	"Will You Be There" (Theme from Free Willy)	Michael Jackson	7:39
12.	"Keep the Faith"	Michael Jackson, Glen Ballard, Siedah Garrett	5:57
13.	"Gone Too Soon"	Larry Grossman, Buz Kohan	3:22
14.	"Dangerous"	Michael Jackson, Bill Bottrell, Teddy Riley	6:59

=== Invincible ===
No.	Title	Writer(s)	Length
1.	"Unbreakable" (featuring The Notorious B.I.G.) (background vocals by Brandy Norwood)	Michael Jackson, Rodney Jerkins, Fred Jerkins III, LaShawn Daniels, Nora Payne, Robert Smith	6:26
2.	"Heartbreaker" (featuring Fats)	Michael Jackson, Rodney Jerkins, Fred Jerkins III, LaShawn Daniels, Mischke Butler, Norman Gregg	5:09
3.	"Invincible" (featuring Fats)	Michael Jackson, Rodney Jerkins, Fred Jerkins III, LaShawn Daniels, Norman Gregg	4:46
4.	"Break of Dawn"	Michael Jackson, Elliot "Dr. Freeze" Straite	5:29
5.	"Heaven Can Wait"	Michael Jackson, Teddy Riley, Andreao Heard, Nate Smith, Teron Beal, Eritza Laues, Kenny Quiller	4:49
6.	"You Rock My World"	Michael Jackson, Rodney Jerkins, Fred Jerkins III, LaShawn Daniels, Nora Payne	5:39
7.	"Butterflies"	Andre Harris, Marsha Ambrosius	4:40
8.	"Speechless"	Michael Jackson	3:18
9.	"2000 Watts" (backing vocals by Teddy Riley)	Michael Jackson, Teddy Riley, Tyrese Gibson, JaRon Henson	4:24
10.	"You Are My Life"	Michael Jackson, Kenneth "Babyface" Edmonds, Carole Bayer Sager, John McClain	4:33
11.	"Privacy" (guitar solo by Slash)	Michael Jackson, Rodney Jerkins, Fred Jerkins III, LaShawn Daniels, Bernard Belle	5:05
12.	"Don't Walk Away"	Michael Jackson, Teddy Riley, Richard Carlton Stites, Reed Vertelney	4:24
13.	"Cry" (also titled "Cry (You Can Change the World)")	R. Kelly	5:00
14.	"The Lost Children"	Michael Jackson	4:00
15.	"Whatever Happens" (guitar by Carlos Santana)	Michael Jackson, Teddy Riley, Gil Cang, Jasmine Quay, Geoffrey Williams	4:56
16.	"Threatened" (contains snippets of Rod Serling)	Michael Jackson, Rodney Jerkins, Fred Jerkins III, LaShawn Daniels	4:18

== Charts ==
=== Weekly charts ===
Chart (2009)	Peak position
Australian Albums (ARIA)	2
Austrian Albums (Ö3 Austria)	13
Belgian Albums (Ultratop Flanders)	1
Belgian Albums (Ultratop Wallonia)	1
Czech Albums (IFPI CNR)	7
Danish Albums (Hitlisten)	1
Dutch Albums (Album Top 100)	2
Finnish Albums (Suomen virallinen lista)	2
French Albums (SNEP)	1
German Albums (Offizielle Top 100)	2
Italian Albums (FIMI)	2
Italian Albums (Musica e Dischi)	2
Norwegian Albums (VG-lista)	4
Polish Albums (ZPAV)	2
Portuguese Albums (AFP)	3
Spanish Albums (Promusicae)	1
Swedish Albums (Sverigetopplistan)	5
Swiss Albums (Schweizer Hitparade)	4
UK Albums (Official Charts)	14

=== Year-end charts ===
Chart (2009)	Position
Belgian Albums (Ultratop Flanders)	10
Belgian Albums (Ultratop Wallonia)	24
Danish Albums (Hitlisten)	1
Dutch Albums (Album Top 100)	21
German Albums (Offizielle Top 100)	39
Swedish Albums (Sverigetopplistan)	24
Swiss Albums (Schweizer Hitparade)	65

Chart (2010)	Position
Belgian Albums (Ultratop Flanders)	83
Dutch Albums (Album Top 100)	89

== Certifications and sales ==
Region	Certification	Certified units/sales
Belgium (BRMA)	Platinum	30,000^{*}
Denmark (IFPI Danmark)	3× Platinum	90,000^{^}
France (SNEP)	Platinum	100,000^{*}
Germany (BVMI)	Gold	100,000^{‡}
Italy (FIMI)	Gold	35,000^{*}
Netherlands (NVPI)	Gold	25,000^{^}
Poland (ZPAV)	2× Platinum	40,000^{*}
Portugal (AFP)	Gold	10,000^{^}
Spain (Promusicae)	Gold	40,000^{^}
Sweden (GLF)	Gold	20,000^{^}
^{*} Sales figures based on certification alone.^{^} Shipments figures based on certification alone.^{‡} Sales+streaming figures based on certification alone.
