= Butterflies (Michael Jackson song) =

Promotional single by Michael Jackson

from the album Invincible
- Released: November 27, 2001
- Recorded: 2001
- Genre: R&B; neo soul
- Length: 4:40: 3:58 (radio edit)
- Label: Epic
- Songwriters: Marsha Ambrosius; Andre Harris
- Producers: Michael Jackson; Andre Harris

Michael Jackson singles chronology
"You Rock My World" (2001)	"Butterflies" (2001)	"Cry" (2001)

Licensed audio
- "Butterflies" on YouTube

Audio sample
- file; help

"Butterflies" is a song by American singer and songwriter Michael Jackson. It was written and composed by Andre Harris and Marsha Ambrosius, and produced by Jackson and Harris. The track appears on Jackson's tenth studio album, Invincible (2001). The song also appeared in The Ultimate Collection (2004). "Butterflies" is a midtempo ballad. The single received generally positive reviews from music critics; some music reviewers described the song as being one of the best songs on Invincible while others felt that it was a "decent track".

The song was released in the United States only to radio airplay and peaked at number fourteen on the Billboard Hot 100, making it his last top 40 hit in his lifetime. There was no music video released for the song.

== Background and development ==
"Butterflies" was recorded by Michael Jackson in 2001 for his tenth studio album, Invincible, which was released the same year. The song was written by Andre Harris and Marsha Ambrosius, who is one half of the London bred neo-soul act Floetry, and was produced by Jackson and Harris. Harris commented on the single: "He's showing you, I'm still the Michael Jackson that did 'Billie Jean' and 'Rock with You' because 'Butterflies' really falls along those lines."

Jackson first met Ambrosius and Natalie Stewart, who is also a member of Floetry, through John McClain, who is DreamWorks's senior urban executive and Jackson's manager. Stewart said she was surprised that Jackson invited her and Ambrosius to a studio and asked for their input on the recording of the track. She recalled in an interview with Launch magazine, "It was incredible because he asked, he continually asked, 'Marsh, what's the next harmony? Girls, does this sound right? What do you think? Is this what you were looking for?' He was so open". Ambrosius recalled: "To begin with, I was kinda shook. Because you don't realize how you're going to feel until you're put in that situation. I had the tears in my eyes and got kinda nervous. But as I got into it, I realized it was work, it was a job. I had to vocally conduct a legend."

Unlike "You Rock My World" and "Cry", a music video was not made to promote the song. A three-track commercial single of the song was scheduled for release on January 15, 2002, but its release was canceled. A remix of the song by Track Masters was released promotionally which features singer Eve.

== Composition ==
"Butterflies" is a midtempo R&B and neo soul love ballad song with groove musical influences. Vaughn Watson of the Providence Journal noted that the track is a "velvety old-school soul ballad" with "elegiac horn riffs" and "simple '70s-style David Ruffin soul." Stephen Thomas Erlewine, a writer for AllMusic noted that "Butterflies" had "Bacharach-styled horns." Lonell Broadnax, Jr., a contributing writer to the Daily Helmsman Online felt that "Butterflies" is a soulful song which takes Jackson back to his "rhythm and blues roots". Ben Rayer of the Toronto Star felt that the song had a "oozy slow jam". "Butterflies" is written in the time signature of common time. Throughout the song Jackson's vocal range spans from E♭_{3} to F_{5}. The track is played in the key of A♭ major. "Butterflies" has a moderately slowly tempo and its metronome is ninety-two beats per minute.

== Critical response ==
The track received generally positive reviews from music critics. Ken Barnes of USA Today described the song as being a "hopelessly sappy ballad oozing with fuzzy sentiments. I'd say it's more like caterpillars." Frank Kogan of The Village Voice, citing the lyrics, "I would give you anything baby, just make my dreams come true/Oh baby you give me butterflies" wrote "so, would he give her, like, caterpillars in exchange? birds?" and added that what grabs his attention about a song like "Butterflies" is not the "melody but the weirdly ringing wrench-against-faucet clang on the backbeat." Christie Leo of the New Straits Times gave the track a more positive review, calling the song a "luxuriant" ballad. Pop music critic Robert Hilburn, writing for the Los Angeles Times, described "Butterflies", and another song from Invincible ("Speechless"), as being "as woefully generic as their titles". A journalist of the same publication felt that track was about romantic "jitters". Darryl Frierson of University Wire felt that songs like "Butterflies" can set the "mood for any romantic interlude". Joel Rubinoff of The Record said that "Butterflies" was one of the "only good songs" from Invincible, while a writer for The Atlanta Journal cited the song as being a "decent track".

A writer for The Atlanta Journal-Constitution viewed "Butterflies" as being "laid-back". Mark Anthony Neal of PopMatters wrote in his music review for Jackson's 2002 album, entitled Love Songs, that in song's such as "Butterflies", it shows the "essence" of Jackson's "genius has been in the boy's uncanny ability to perform, even the mundane, outside of the box." Elliot Sylvester of The Independent felt that ballads on Invincible such as "Speechless" and "Butterflies" are "almost to a formulaic fault." Chicago Tribune rock music critic Greg Kot said that Jackson is not "convincing as the vulnerable ladies' man on drippy ballads" such as "Butterflies". Stephen Thomas Erlewine, a writer for AllMusic, commented that Invincible was "highlighted" by "lovely ballads" such as "Break of Dawn" and "Butterflies". David Browne of Entertainment Weekly wrote in his review for Invincible that, "The ballads are a squishy bunch with glaringly banal lyrics, pleasantries like 'Butterflies' and 'Break of Dawn' that could emanate from just about" anyone. A journalist for The Philadelphia Inquirer called the track "gorgeous" and Bomani Jones of Salon.com called "Butterflies" a "sparkling" track. Ben Rayer of the Toronto Star wrote that Jackson "fares best" on "Butterflies".

Catherine Halaby of the Yale Daily News said that songs on the album like "Heaven Can Wait", "Butterflies", and "You Are My Life" "fulfill the quota for sugary ballads". Jon Pareles, writing for The New York Times, said that tracks on Invincible like "Butterflies" and "Don't Walk Away" are "melting love ballads". Pareles noted in his review for the album that songs on it are recurring themes present on Jackson's albums, such as love ballads, as well as tracks pertaining to making the world a better place. Tim Perzyk of the Duke Chronicle wrote, "By the time 'Butterflies' spins on track seven, it's unclear why Michael didn't record a collaborative boxed set with Mariah Carey, whose 'Heartbreaker', 'Breakdown' and 'Butterfly' would fit quite nicely" into Jackson's Invincible album. Pop music critic Craid Seymour of the Buffalo News wrote that "another winning tune" on the album is the "dreamy 'Butterflies', which flows along at a groovy midtempo pace." Kevin C. Johnson of the St. Louis Post-Dispatch described "Butterflies" as being about the "feeling that special someone gives him." Music critics writing for the South Florida Sun Sentinel said that the track shows the "shy, loving, gentle side" of Jackson.

== Chart performance ==
"Butterflies" entered the Billboard Hot 100 chart in early November 2001, at number sixty. The single eventually peaked at number fourteen on the Billboard Hot 100 the week ending January 26, 2002. The same week, the track peaked at number two on the Billboard Hot R&B/Hip-Hop Songs chart; the song was held from the top position by Ja Rule and Ashanti's "Always on Time". "Butterflies" also peaked at number thirty-six on the Billboard Top 40 Mainstream chart. The track was also released as a promotional single internationally but did not chart on any music charts outside of the United States. The song was Jackson's last hit single in the United States in the final years of his career.

== Credits and personnel ==
Adapted from the album's liner notes.

- Written and composed by Andre Harris and Marsha Ambrosius
- Produced by Michael Jackson and Andre Harris
- Lead vocal by Michael Jackson
- Background vocals by Michael Jackson and Marsha Ambrosius
- All musical instruments performed by Andre Harris
- Horns by Norman Jeff Bradshaw and Matt Cappy
- Recorded by Andre Harris and Bruce Swedien
- Assistant engineering by Vidal Davis
- Mixed by Bruce Swedien

== Charts ==
=== Weekly charts ===
Weekly chart performance for "Butterflies"
Chart (2001–2002)	Peak position
US Billboard Hot 100	14
US Hot R&B/Hip-Hop Songs (Billboard)	2
US Pop Airplay (Billboard)	36
US Rhythmic Airplay (Billboard)	36

=== Year-end charts ===
Year-end chart performance for "Butterflies"
Chart (2002)	Position
US Billboard Hot 100	64
US Hot R&B/Hip-Hop Songs (Billboard)	12

== Release history ==
Release dates and formats for "Butterflies"
Region	Date	Format	Label	Ref.
United States	November 27, 2001	Contemporary hit radio	Epic	
