= What More Can I Give =

2002 song by Michael Jackson

Single by Michael Jackson and the All Stars
- Released: October 27, 2003 (download)
- Recorded: September 1999 – November 2001
- Genre: Pop; R&B; country; soul; Latin pop
- Length: 5:10 (English); 4:39 (Spanish); 3:36 (2003 edit, English)
- Label: Epic; Sony Music
- Songwriters: Michael Jackson; Rubén Blades (Spanish lyrics)
- Producer: Michael Jackson

Michael Jackson singles chronology
"Cry" (2001)	"What More Can I Give" (2003)	"One More Chance" (2003)

"What More Can I Give" (also "Todo Para Ti" in Spanish) is a song written by American singer Michael Jackson and recorded in 2001 by Jackson and a supergroup of singers following the September 11 attacks. The inspiration for the song had initially come to Jackson after a meeting with the President of South Africa Nelson Mandela in the late 1990s. The initial Mandela–inspired version of the song was to be performed by Jackson in concert, and Jackson said it would be issued as a charity single for the refugees of the Kosovo War, which ended in 1999, but these plans were not carried out.

Following the September 11 attacks in 2001, Jackson reworked "What More Can I Give" at the suggestion of producer Marc Schaffel. Jackson and other artists recorded the new version of the song shortly afterward; the other artists included Mariah Carey, Reba McEntire, Anastacia, Nick Carter, 3LW, Beyoncé, NSYNC, Celine Dion, Boyz II Men members Shawn Stockman & Michael McCary, Brian McKnight, Luther Vandross, and Usher. In addition, a Spanish language version of the song was recorded. Entitled "Todo Para Ti", the lyrics were adapted into Spanish by the Panamanian musician Rubén Blades. Schaffel brought three-time Grammy winner K. C. Porter on to the project to give the Spanish version a different sound from the English recording.

"What More Can I Give" was scheduled for release as a charity single in the hope that $50 million would be raised between downloads, sponsors, and donations to aid the survivors and the families of victims of the September 11 terrorist attacks. The plan, however, never came to fruition and the reasons why have varied between sources and the individuals involved. One newspaper stated that the song was abandoned after Jackson started a public campaign against Sony Music and its USA music head.

"What More Can I Give" was played on the radio for the first time in late 2002. The debut airing was made without permission by radio station WKTU-FM in New York. The following year, on October 27, 2003, "What More Can I Give" was made available to the public by way of digital download for several days. Jackson had the song taken down on November 17, on the eve of the raid on his Neverland Valley Ranch property by Santa Barbara Sheriffs. Proceeds from the short sale of the song went to children's charities.

Schaffel enlisted friend and famed Brazilian artist Romero Britto to design, create, and paint an artwork to be used as the cover for the single. Britto created the "ribbon" piece in bright colors including yellow, blue and red. Britto created 250 of this piece as a special collector's item and both Britto and Michael Jackson signed and numbered each of these pieces.

Jackson appeared in the video produced by Marc Schaffel. It is believed to be the last actual completed song and video that Jackson did and approved for release. It was also one of only a few tracks Jackson ever performed in Spanish and is considered the last.

== Background and writing ==
Michael Jackson originally started writing the song, originally titled "Heal L.A.", with Brad Buxer after the Rodney King verdict and following riots in 1992. The song was worked on throughout the making of the HIStory: Past, Present and Future, Book I album (1995) and its subsequent world tour in 1996 to 1997. In late 1997, when work began on Jackson's tenth studio album Invincible (2001), the song was put on hold, but its completion was always a passion of Jackson's. Jackson was inspired to finish "Heal L.A." after a meeting with anti-apartheid activist and President of South Africa Nelson Mandela in 1999. Jackson said that during a conversation with Mandela, the concept of giving was discussed. Jackson revealed that it was during this interaction that the words "what more can I give" came into his mind and he began writing. With the first version of the song completed, Jackson intended to premiere it at his MJ & Friends concerts, staged in Munich, Germany and the South Korean capital Seoul in June 1999. Ultimately, Jackson did not perform the song at the concerts and it remained unreleased.

"What More Can I Give" was also intended to be released as a charity single to aid the Kosovar refugees who had been forced out of their home during the Kosovo War (1998–1999). Jackson revealed his intentions for the release in an interview with the British tabloid newspaper the Daily Mirror. Jackson stated that television footage of the war had upset him and that he wanted to go to Yugoslavia to hug every one of the suffering children. Like before, however, the song failed to gain a release as a single and was not considered good enough for inclusion on Jackson's 2001 Invincible album.

In 2001, two separate concerts were held on September 7 and September 10 in celebration of Michael Jackson's thirtieth year as a solo entertainer (his first solo single, "Got to Be There", was released in 1971). Held in New York City, the shows sold out within five hours of going on sale. The concerts featured performances by artists such as Usher, Whitney Houston, Mýa and Liza Minnelli. They also contained solo performances by Jackson himself, and marked the onstage reunion of the pop singer and his brothers (The Jacksons).

Hours following the second concert, the attacks on the World Trade Center in New York City, the Pentagon outside of Washington, D.C., and a crash near Shanksville, Pennsylvania, resulted in the loss of 2,993 lives. Following the events of September 11, Jackson rewrote "What More Can I Give" and expressed his views on the song, writing and music. "I'm not one to sit back and say, 'Oh, I feel bad for what happened to them' [...] I want the whole world to sing ["What More Can I Give"], to bring us together as a world, because a song is a mantra, something you repeat over and over. And we need peace, we need giving, we need love, we need unity."

== Recording ==
"What More Can I Give" was recorded in 2001 by a number of artists, mainly pop. The project had received an "overwhelming response from major artists all over the world", with musicians such as Anastacia, Beyoncé, Nick Carter, Aaron Carter, NSYNC and Carlos Santana offering to lend their voices to the track. The recording process was held in Los Angeles, California and destinations reachable by Michael Jackson's private plane and mobile production unit headed by Marc Schaffel, who traveled across the globe with a team to record the different artists. The all-star benefit followed a similar Jackson-effort, "We Are the World", which raised millions of dollars for famine relief in Africa. The recording of "What More Can I Give" was completed in October 2001.

In addition to the English-language version of "What More Can I Give", a Spanish version of the song was recorded. Entitled "Todo Para Ti", the track features several of the musicians on the English version, as well as Latin artists such as Alejandro Sanz, Juan Gabriel, and Cristian Castro, who only appear on the Spanish-language version. The title for "Todo Para Ti" translates to "Everything for You" in English. Producer and songwriter K. C. Porter had directly translated the title of "What More Can I Give" initially, but it was changed after Jackson expressed that he felt it was too clumsy.

=== The All Stars ===
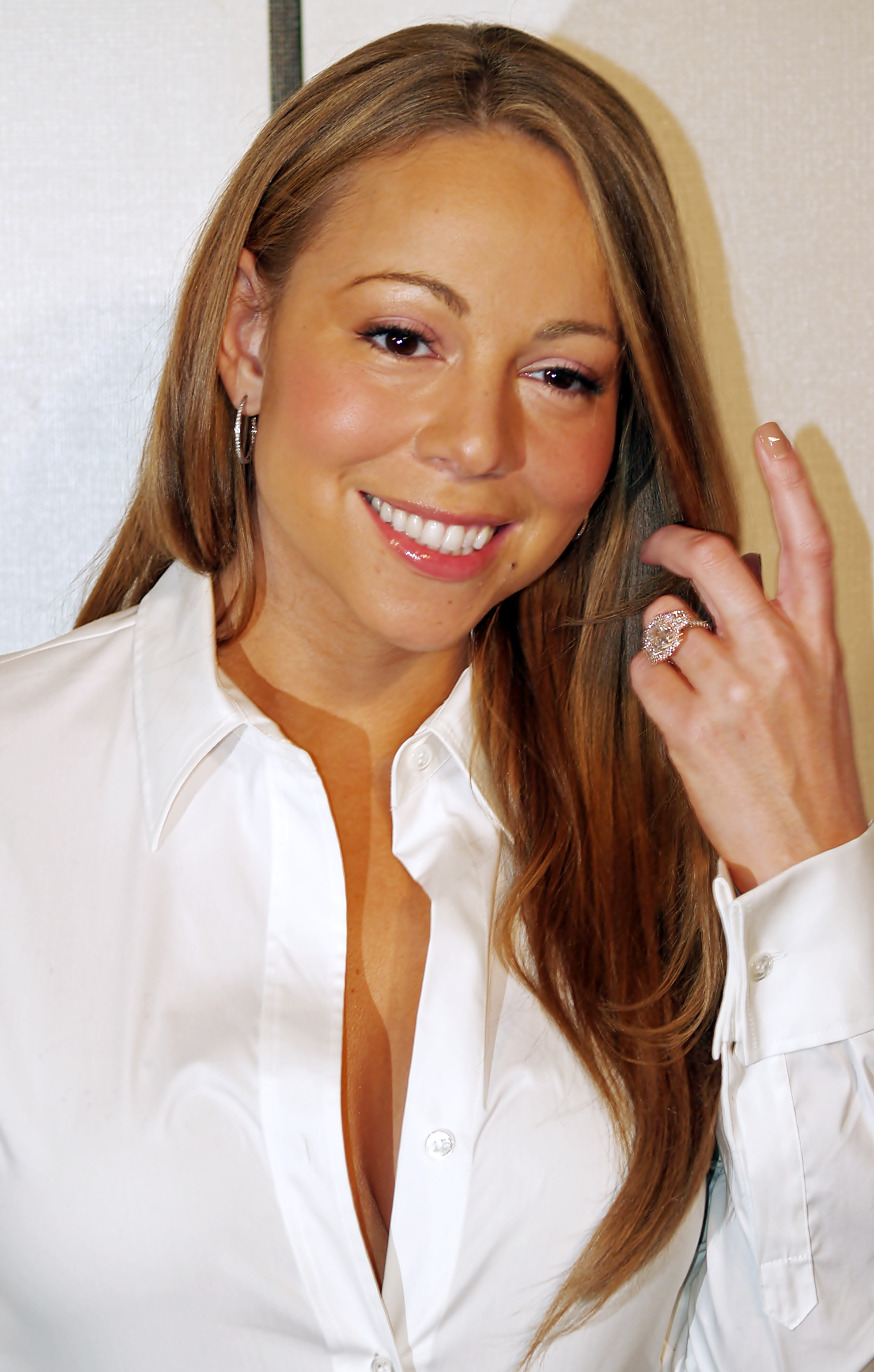
Mariah Carey

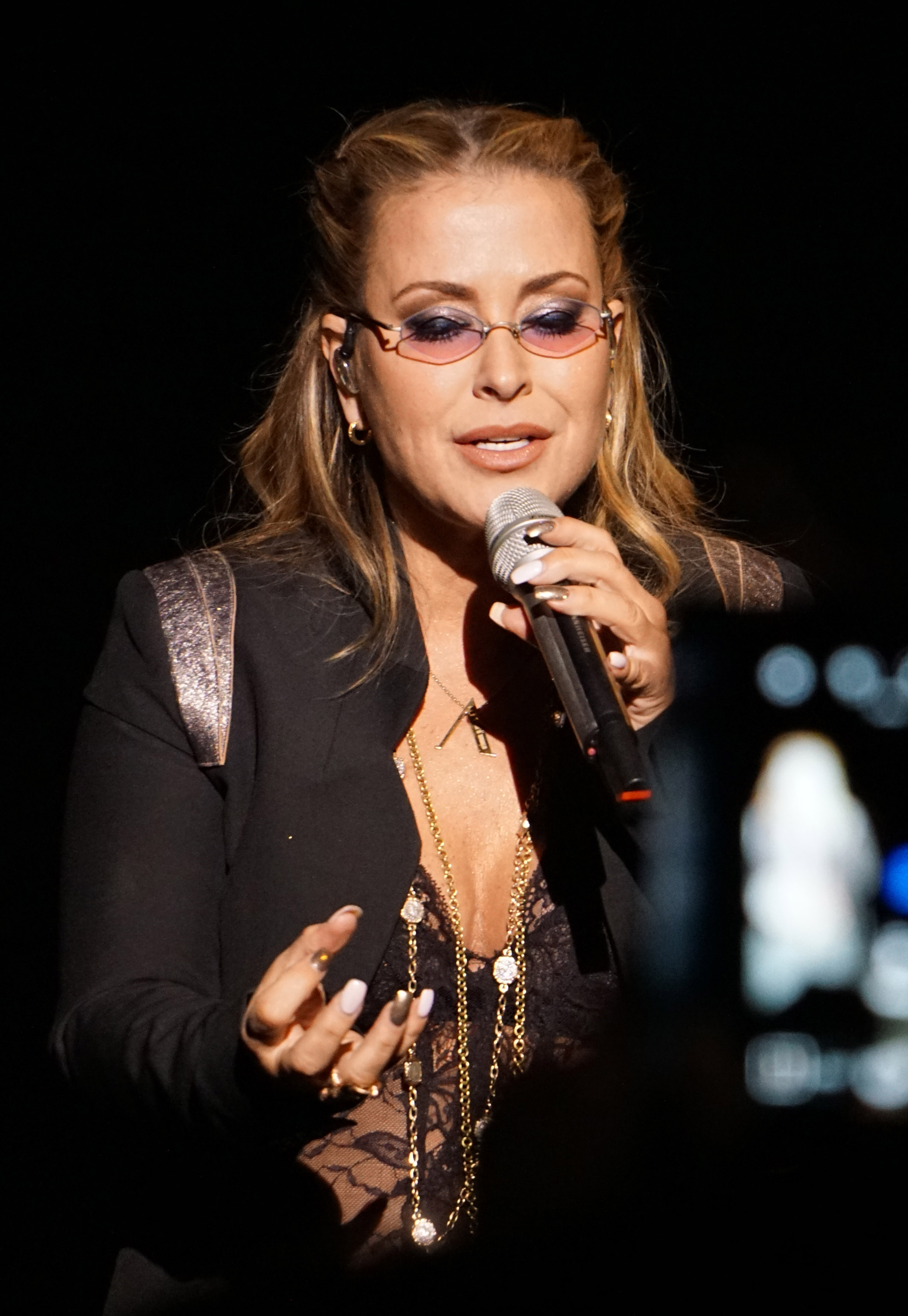
Anastacia

Artist	Appears on English version	Appears on Spanish version
3LW	Yes	No
Aaron Carter	Yes	No
Alejandro Sanz	No	Yes
Anastacia	Yes	Yes
Beyoncé	Yes	No
Billy Gilman	Yes	No
Brian McKnight	Yes	Yes
Bryton James	Yes	No
Carlos Santana	Yes	Yes
Celine Dion	Yes	Yes
Cristian Castro	No	Yes
Emilio Navaira	Yes	No
Gloria Estefan	Yes	Yes
Hanson	Yes	No
Jon Secada	Yes	Yes
Joy Enriquez	No	Yes
Juan Gabriel	No	Yes
Julio Iglesias	No	Yes
Justin Timberlake	Yes	No
La Mafia	No	Yes
Laura Pausini	No	Yes
Luis Miguel	No	Yes
Luther Vandross	Yes	Yes
Mariah Carey	Yes	Yes
Michael McCary	Yes	No
Mýa	Yes	Yes
*NSYNC	Yes	No
Nick Carter	Yes	No
Olga Tañón	No	Yes
Reba McEntire	Yes	No
Ricky Martin	Yes	Yes
Rubén Blades	No	Yes
Shakira	Yes	Yes
Shawn Stockman	Yes	No
Thalía	Yes	Yes
Tom Petty	Yes	No
Usher	Yes	No
Ziggy Marley	Yes	No

== Live performance ==
"What More Can I Give" was performed live at the 9/11 benefit concert United We Stand: What More Can I Give. Held at the Robert F. Kennedy Memorial Stadium in Washington, D.C., on October 21, 2001, the eight-hour concert featured numerous artists performing to a sell-out audience of 54,000 people. Jackson performed his song "Man in the Mirror", before he and other singers such as Rod Stewart, Al Green, James Brown, Sean Combs and Pink closed the show with "What More Can I Give". Joe D'Angelo of MTV later stated that the entire performance was held together by Jackson and Billy Gilman, who he claimed were the only two who looked like they knew the lyrics to the song. He concluded that the collective rendition of the song was altogether "choppy and disparate". Jon Pareles also wrote negatively about the performance. He stated that it "became a shambles as [a] stageful of guests missed their cues or couldn't be heard".

Jackson's appearance during the "What More Can I Give" performance was later edited out of American Broadcasting Company's airing of the show. The company were forced to take the action after representatives of Jackson informed them that CBS had demanded that the singer not perform on a network show before a Jackson special being broadcast on their channel the following month. CBS executives, however, denied their insistence on Jackson's removal from the footage. They stated that if the singer had appeared in the broadcast footage, they most probably would have been forced to delay Jackson's show, so that it would not appear too soon after the airing of United We Stand: What More Can I Give.

== Planned release as a physical single ==
I believe in my heart that the music community will come together as one and rally to the aid of thousands of innocent victims. There is a tremendous need for relief dollars right now and through this effort each one of us can play an immediate role in helping comfort so many people.

— Michael Jackson, 2001

"What More Can I Give" had been planned for release as a charity single to aid survivors and families of victims of the September 11 terrorist attacks. At the time of the attacks, Jackson stated that he hoped to raise $50 million for those affected. It was also proclaimed by Jackson's spokesman that the recording would be released as soon as possible, with further reports revealing that it could be made available in music stores within that month.

== Airplay ==
One year after the all-star recording of "What More Can I Give", it was played for the first time on radio. WKTU-FM, a radio station based in New York, debuted the song without permission and played it in heavy rotation. WKTU-FM's Program Director Frankie Blue stated at the time, "This song is a gift to the world. Michael and everyone donated their time for it, and it deserves to be heard. The song is called "What More Can I Give", and I can give the world a song they can cling onto and hopefully make them think about what they can give." It is unknown how the station acquired a copy of the song; both Jackson and Schaffel were uninvolved with it. Prior to the airing, at least 200 promo copies of the song were sent to the musicians who participated in the recording process, as well as to their representatives. Schaffel stated that he would hate to see the song not being used to raise money for charity, the intended purpose. WKTU-FM received numerous telephone calls and emails from listeners following their unauthorized playing of the song, thanking the station and asking where they could buy a copy of "What More Can I Give".

== Release as a digital single ==
"What More Can I Give" was eventually made available as a digital download on October 27, 2003. The websites whatmorecanigive.com and musicforgiving.com sold the song at a price of $2 per download, with a portion of the proceeds from the fee going towards children's charities such as Oneness, Mr. Holland's Opus Foundation and the International Child Art Foundation. The charities support arts programs to eliminate racism, increase education and connect children throughout the world, respectively. The download project had been set up by Jackson with the American media company Clear Channel Communications.

== Music video ==
The music video premiered at the 2003 Radio Music Awards; it features the song's artists (The All Stars) recording the track.

== Notes ==
1.The Spanish version is not available in its entirety.

== Bibliography ==
- Grant, Adrian (2009). Michael Jackson: The Visual Documentary. Omnibus Press. ISBN 978-1-84938-261-8.
- Halstead, Craig (2007). Michael Jackson: For the Record. Authors On Line. ISBN 978-0-7552-0267-6.
