= Speechless (Michael Jackson song) =

2001 song by Michael Jackson

Promotional single by Michael Jackson

from the album Invincible
- Released: June 21, 2001
- Recorded: 1999
- Genre: Pop; neo-soul; gospel
- Length: 3:18
- Label: Epic
- Songwriter: Michael Jackson
- Producer: Michael Jackson

Michael Jackson promotional singles chronology
"Is It Scary" (1997)	"Speechless" (2001)	"Butterflies" (2001)

Audio
- "Speechless" on YouTube

"Speechless" is a song by the American recording artist Michael Jackson, included on his tenth studio album, Invincible (2001). It was only released as a promotional single in South Korea. The singer was inspired to write the ballad after a water balloon fight with children in Germany. Jackson collaborated on the production with musicians such as Jeremy Lubbock, Brad Buxer, Novi Novoq, Stuart Bradley and Bruce Swedien. Andraé Crouch and his gospel choir provided backing vocals.

Executives at Jackson's record label, Epic Records, responded positively to the track when given a preview several months before Invincible's release. "Speechless" was issued as a promotional single. Music critics focused on the track's a cappellas, lyrics and music. A clip of Jackson singing "Speechless" was included in the 2009 documentary-concert film Michael Jackson's This Is It.

== Writing and recording ==
Michael Jackson wrote "Speechless" after a water balloon fight with children in Germany. It took him 45 minutes. In an interview with Vibe magazine, the musician commented, "I was so happy after the fight that I ran upstairs in their house and wrote 'Speechless'. Fun inspires me. I hate to say that, because it's such a romantic song." He added, "But it was the fight that did it. I was happy, and I wrote it in its entirety right there. I felt it would be good enough for the album. Out of the bliss comes magic, wonderment, and creativity." Jackson would consider "Speechless" to be one of his favorite songs on Invincible.

"Speechless" was one of only two songs from Invincible to be written solely by Jackson (the second song being "The Lost Children"). Jeremy Lubbock worked with the musician in arranging and conducting an orchestra. Instrumentalists on the track included Brad Buxer on keyboards, and Novi Novog and Thomas Tally on violas. The violinists consisted of Peter Kent, Gina Kronstadt, Robin Lorentz, Kirstin Fife and John Wittenberg. The track featured backing vocals from Andraé Crouch and his gospel choir, The Andraé Crouch Singers. "Speechless" was digitally edited by Buxer and Stuart Brawley, and was mixed by Bruce Swedien, who later said, "Everything with Michael is a stand-out moment but an absolutely gorgeous piece of music called 'Speechless' was really an event. Michael sings the first eight bars a cappella. At the end, he closes it off a cappella – it was Michael's idea to add the a cappella parts."

== Composition ==
The lyrics to "Speechless" deal with being lost for words because of love. The song opens with Jackson's singing a cappella: "Your love is magical, that's how I feel, but I have not the words here to explain", which Rick de Yampert of The Daytona Beach News-Journal felt the singer "[crooned] sweetly". The chorus includes the lines, "Speechless, speechless, that's how you make me feel. Though I'm with you, I am far away and nothing is for real." A second a cappella verse bookends the track.

"Speechless" is a pop ballad, and is labeled as "neo-gospel". According to Musicnotes.com by Alfred Music Publishing, the track was performed in common time, with a tempo of 80 beats per minute. The song starts in the key of B♭ major and transitions to C major. After the bridge the song transitions to D Major as a choir starts singing, the last two choruses in E Major, ending with a solo a cappella ending by Jackson. The song's vocal range is from F_{3} to B_{4}.

== Post-production and release ==
In June 2001, several months before the release of Invincible, "Speechless" was among several songs showcased from the album exclusively to executives of Jackson's music label, Epic Records (a subsidiary of Sony Music Entertainment). Other songs previewed included "Unbreakable", "The Lost Children", "Whatever Happens", "Break of Dawn", "Heaven Can Wait" and "Privacy", all of which featured on Invincible's track listing. Gossip blogger Roger Friedman of Fox News reported that the executives who listened to the previews liked what they heard. Epic Records' president, Dave Glew, said of the tracks, "It's wonderful and amazing. Michael is singing better than ever." He added, "The ballads! The ballads are beautiful, and they're all there." "Speechless" was later released as a promotional single in 2001. A remixed version of "You Rock My World", featuring rapper Jay-Z, served as the single's B-side. After Jackson's death, a clip of the entertainer singing "Speechless" was included in Michael Jackson's This Is It, a commercially successful documentary-concert film of the singer's rehearsals for his London concert series.

== Critical reception ==
Craig Seymour of The Buffalo News felt that the song was the only one from the album in which Jackson successfully revisited his past. The journalist said the song was reminiscent of the 1995 chart-topper "You Are Not Alone", as it sounded to him like a track that could have been written by R. Kelly, who penned the number one hit. Writing for the Chicago Sun-Times, Jim DeRogatis described "Speechless" as a "beautifully minimal, heartfelt romantic ballad". Music journalist Roger Catlin stated that the song leaned toward "neo-gospel". The New York Post said that "Speechless" was "lullaby-like" and the best song on Invincible, and Jon Pareles of The New York Times praised Jackson's "long lines and creamy overdubbed choruses [sailing] weightlessly" in the ballad, that the journalist felt it was a love song to God.

Pop music critic Robert Hilburn described "Speechless", and another song from Invincible ("Butterflies"), as being "as woefully generic as their titles". Ben Rayner of the Toronto Star contested that the a cappellas in "Speechless" were enough to make a person wish that Jackson actually was unable to make a sound. Michigan Daily writer Dustin J. Seibert wrote that the song was a "shining [example] of what happens when The Gloved One gets beside himself and writes smarmy crap that should be reserved for a CD changer somewhere in a preschool". The Fort Worth Star-Telegram said that "Speechless" was one of the weaker tracks from Invincible. Elliot Sylvester of The Independent felt that the song was "pure Jackson – almost to a formulaic fault". The Dallas Morning News' Thor Christensen said that "Speechless" was "produced by Mr. Jackson in bombastic style à la Celine Dion". He added that as the track ended with an emotional Jackson, it drew a parallel with the singer's 1972 ode to a rat, "Ben".

Vaughn Watson of The Providence Journal hailed "Speechless" as Invincible's "best song, and one of Jackson's finest of any album". He added that with the song, the musician acknowledged the pain that accompanies isolation. In a review of Invincible, The Wichita Eagle stated that "Speechless", "Don't Walk Away" and "Cry" were among the "sincere ballads" in which Jackson was exemplary. Ada Anderson of The Ball State Daily News expressed the view that "Speechless" would become a popular song, and writers for the South Florida Sun-Sentinel stated that the ballad would take time to get used to. The Dayton Daily News' Ron Rollins described the track as a "pretty love song". Music critic Kevin C. Johnson thought that "Speechless" was "one of [Jackson's] typical, whispery ballads that swells as it moves along". A journalist for The Olympian stated that the song was "gorgeous".

== Track listing ==
- Promotional CD single
1. "Speechless" – 3:18
2. "You Rock My World" (Track Masters Mix) (featuring Jay-Z) – 3:28

== Personnel ==
- Written, composed, produced, lead and background vocals by Michael Jackson.
- Orchestra arranged and conducted by Michael Jackson and Jeremy Lubbock
- Keyboards performed by Brad Buxer
- Viola performed by Novi Novog and Thomas Tally
- Violin performed by Peter Kent, Gina Kronstadt, Robin Lorentz, Kirstin Fife and John Wittenberg

== Thriller – Live cast version ==
"Speechless – A Tribute to Michael Jackson"

Single by Thriller – Live cast
- Released: June 21, 2010
- Recorded: 2010
- Genre: Pop
- Length: 4:25
- Label: Motivation
- Songwriter: Michael Jackson
- Producer: Dave Loughran

On June 21, 2010, six performers in the West End of London show Thriller – Live released "Speechless" as a single with the official name "Speechless – A Tribute to Michael Jackson" to commemorate the one-year anniversary of Jackson's death. All proceeds from the recording were donated to the charity War Child.

=== Personnel ===
- Written and originally produced by Michael Jackson
- Produced, edited and mixed by Dave Loughran
- Executive producer: Adrian Grant for Key Concerts & Entertainment
- Vocal arrangement by John Maher
- Music arranged and performed by Dave Loughran
- Hammond organ performed by John Maher
- Lead vocals: James Anderson, Jean-Mikhael Baque, Kieran Alleyne, Kuan Frye, Mitchell Zhangazha, MJ Mytton-Sanneh
- Choir: Britt Quentin, Hope Lyndsey Plumb, J Rome, Jenessa Qua, Linda John-Pierre, Olamide Oshinowo, Paul Clancy, Terrence Ryan, Wayne Anthony-Cole
- Mastered by Steve Kitch

=== Track listing ===
- Digital download
1. "Speechless – A Tribute to Michael Jackson" (single version) – 4:25

== Bibliography ==
- Grant, Adrian (2009). Michael Jackson: The Visual Documentary. Omnibus Press. ISBN 978-1-84938-261-8.
- Jones, Jel (2005). Michael Jackson, the King of Pop: The Big Picture: the Music! the Man! the Legend! the Interviews!. Amber Books Publishing. ISBN 0-9749779-0-X.
- Taraborrelli, J. Randy (2004). The Magic and the Madness. Headline. ISBN 0-330-42005-4.
