= The Definitive Collection (Michael Jackson album) =

Compilation album by Michael Jackson
- Released: August 25, 2009
- Recorded: 1969–1974; 1984 (overdubs on "Farewell My Summer Love")
- Length: 65:20
- Label: Universal Motown
- Producer: Harry Weinger

Michael Jackson chronology
The Stripped Mixes (2009)	The Definitive Collection (2009)	Hello World: The Motown Solo Collection (2009)

The Definitive Collection is a compilation album by American singer Michael Jackson released by Universal Motown on August 25, 2009, and the third album to be released since his death, being released exactly two months later. A vinyl edition was later released on August 28, 2026.

== Chart performance ==
The Definitive Collection charted on number 39 on the Billboard 200 and number 17 on Top R&B/Hip-Hop Albums charts.

== Reception ==
Stephen Thomas Erlewine of AllMusic said: "Released roughly three days after Michael Jackson's passing, The Definitive Collection is a 19-track collection of highlights from his Motown recordings, including the hits he had with his brothers in the Jackson 5. This emphasizes Michael's solo hits over the Jackson 5's—there are ten cuts of him alone, nine with his brothers (and one of those is an alternate 'minus mix' of 'I'll Be There')—which skews this a little bit toward puppy love over bubblegum, something that may be a little too syrupy for some listeners, but there's no denying that for fans lacking a collection of Michael's earliest hits, this is a useful compilation, gathering 'I Want You Back', 'ABC', 'The Love You Save', 'Who's Lovin' You', 'Never Can Say Goodbye', 'Got to Be There', 'Rockin' Robin', 'Ben', and 'Dancing Machine' in one place."

== Track listing ==
No.	Title	Writer(s)	Length
1.	"I Want You Back"	The Corporation (Berry Gordy, Freddie Perren, Deke Richards, Alphonzo Mizell)	2:58
2.	"ABC"	The Corporation	2:57
3.	"The Love You Save"	The Corporation	3:03
4.	"I'll Be There"	Berry Gordy, Bob West, Hal Davis, Willie Hutch	3:56
5.	"Never Can Say Goodbye"	Clifton Davis	2:59
6.	"Maybe Tomorrow"	The Corporation	4:45
7.	"Got to Be There"	Elliot Willensky	3:23
8.	"Rockin' Robin"	Leon Rene	2:32
9.	"I Wanna Be Where You Are"	Arthur "T-Boy" Ross, Leon Ware	2:59
10.	"Ain't No Sunshine"	Bill Withers	4:10
11.	"Ben"	Walter Scharf, Don Black	2:44
12.	"With a Child's Heart"	Vicki Basemore, Henry Cosby, Sylvia Moy	3:32
13.	"One Day in Your Life"	Sam Brown, Renée Armand	4:13
14.	"We're Almost There"	Brian Holland, Edward Holland Jr.	3:44
15.	"Dancing Machine"	Hal Davis, Don Fletcher, Dean Parks	2:37
16.	"Just a Little Bit of You"	Brian Holland, Edward Holland Jr.	3:12
17.	"Farewell My Summer Love"	Keni St. Lewis	3:41
18.	"Who's Lovin' You"	Smokey Robinson	4:00
19.	"I'll Be There" (Minus Mix)	Berry Gordy, Bob West, Hal Davis, Willie Hutch	3:55

== Charts ==
Chart (2009)	Peak position
US Billboard 200	39
US Top R&B/Hip-Hop Albums (Billboard)	17

Chart (2026)	Peak position
Dutch Vinyl Albums (Dutch Charts)	29
