= The Stripped Mixes =

Remix album by Michael Jackson
- Released: July 7, 2009
- Recorded: 1969–1972
- Length: 38:29
- Label: Motown
- Producers: Jeff Moskow; Freddie Perren; Deke Richards; Tom Rowland; Bobby Taylor; Lawrence D. Brown; The Corporation; Hal Davis; Berry Gordy Jr.; George Gordy; Alphonso Mizell; Fonce Mizell

Michael Jackson chronology
The Collection (2009)	The Stripped Mixes (2009)	The Definitive Collection (2009)

Singles from The Stripped Mixes
- 1. "I'll Be There (Minus Mix)" Released: June 9, 2009

The Stripped Mixes (released on CD for a limited time as The Motown 50 Mixes) is a collection of American singer and former Jackson 5 member Michael Jackson's classic songs. The songs featured on the album are mainly from Jackson's career as a member of the Jackson 5 from the late 1960s to the 1970s. Songs credited to Jackson as a solo artist are from his albums during his Motown era. Other songs included on the album are "stripped" mixes of Jackson material, meaning the songs are of a quieter tone and most of the drums have been removed.

Following a surge in Jackson's popularity after his death in June 2009, it was confirmed on July 7 that The Stripped Mixes would be released. The album was made available as a digital download on July 7, 2009, and as a CD on July 28. A remixed song, entitled "I'll Be There (Minus Mix)", was released on iTunes to promote the album on June 9, 2009, prior to Jackson's death. The Stripped Mixes was the second Jackson compilation album to be posthumously released, the first being The Collection, which was released over two weeks prior. The Stripped Mixes received mixed reviews from music critics. The album was a moderate commercial success.

== Concept ==
Due to the high popularity of a State Farm Insurance commercial featuring an acoustic version of the hit "I'll Be There", Motown released "I'll Be There (Minus Mix)" via iTunes on June 9, 2009, as a prelude to The Stripped Mixes. "I'll Be There (Minus Mix)" did not chart on any music charts. Shortly after Jackson's death in June 2009, his music experienced a surge in popularity, leading to re-issues of his music. Less than an hour after the memorial service for Jackson at the Staples Center on July 7, 2009, Universal Music Group announced The Stripped Mixes, a collection of Jackson's classic songs, would be released. The album features "stripped" mixes of Jackson's classic Motown-era songs as well as songs recorded while he was a member of the Jackson 5 from the 1960s to the 1980s. The songs that are "stripped" on the album have backing instruments and some studio engineering removed to make the songs have a more acoustic sound. The Stripped Mixes was made available as a digital download on July 7, and as a compact disc on July 28, 2009.

== Reception ==
=== Commercial performance ===
The Stripped Mixes charted at a peak position of #95 on the Billboard 200 in its debut week with sales of less than five thousand units. It charted at #43 on the R&B Albums Chart in 2009, and moved up to #21 in 2010. Internationally, The Stripped Mixes was more successful commercially. The album charted within the top fifty in Belgium Flanders and Belgium Wallonia, peaking at #43 and #47 for five and seven weeks, respectively. The Stripped Mixes also charted at #75 in Mexico for one week before dropping out of the top 100.

=== Critical reception ===
Professional ratings
Review scores
Source	Rating
AllMusic	link
PR Newswire	positive
TheDwarf.com.au	positive link
Tone Publications	positive link

The Stripped Mixes received mixed reviews from contemporary music critics. Writer Stephen Thomas Erlewine of AllMusic gave The Stripped Mixes two out of five stars, stating that he felt that "the logic of what is left behind doesn't quite make sense", pointing out that "I Want You Back" and "ABC" have no drums and "feel a little tipsy and top-heavy"; "Ben" and "With a Child's Heart" have echoes of strings in the background, making it hard to identify the songs as being "stripped". He added that since the genius lies in the arrangements, "having so much of the arrangement absent" means that the music "just sounds awkward and incomplete, as if it was waiting for the final round of mixing and overdubs." Erlewine's overall opinion on the album was "if the purpose of this disc is to draw attention to Michael's vocals, The Stripped Mixes does its job, but just because his voice is pushed front and center does not mean that this is the best place to appreciate his genius."

A writer for PR Newswire praised the album, describing it as "showcasing" Jackson's vocal talent and viewed The Stripped Mixes as shining a "bright, fresh light" on Jackson's early career both as a solo artist and with his brothers in the Jackson 5. Natalie Salvo of TheDwarf.com.au commented that the mix of "Ain't No Sunshine" made the album "personally" worth buying. She added that "the music does what it's supposed to do", which was "evoking the right mood but not being overly showy." Despite the praise, she did state that the album could be clinically looked at as an "element of bad taste" from a "greedy record company" and noted that it was "difficult" to "stop yourself being overcome with cynicism towards this album". Jeff Dorgay of Tone Publications described all of the album's tracks as being "quite strong" and added that "regardless of your interest in Michael Jackson" The Stripped Mixes is a disc "you should have in your collection" because it offers a "rare look" at "classic" material by Jackson when he was beginning his career.

== Track listing ==
No.	Title	Writer(s)	Original version from	Length
1.	"I'll Be There" (Minus Mix)	Berry Gordy, Bob West, Hal Davis, Willie Hutch	Third Album	3:55
2.	"Ben" (Stripped Mix)	Don Black, Walter Scharf	Ben	2:42
3.	"Who's Lovin' You" (Stripped Mix)	Smokey Robinson	Diana Ross Presents The Jackson 5	4:24
4.	"Ain't No Sunshine" (Stripped Mix)	Bill Withers	Got to Be There	4:08
5.	"I Want You Back" (Stripped Mix)	The Corporation	Diana Ross Presents the Jackson 5	3:48
6.	"ABC" (Stripped Mix)	The Corporation	ABC	3:11
7.	"We've Got a Good Thing Going" (Stripped Mix)	The Corporation	Ben	3:15
8.	"With a Child's Heart" (Stripped Mix)	Basemore, Henry Cosby, Sylvia Moy	Music & Me	4:07
9.	"Darling Dear" (Stripped Mix)	Gordy/Gordy/Story	Third Album	2:33
10.	"Got to Be There" (Stripped Mix)	Elliot Willensky	Got to Be There	3:15
11.	"Never Can Say Goodbye" (Stripped Mix)	Clifton Davis	Maybe Tomorrow	3:11

== Charts ==
Chart (2009–2010)	Peak position
Belgian Albums (Ultratop Flanders)	43
Belgian Albums (Ultratop Wallonia)	47
Mexican Albums (Top 100 Mexico)	75
US Billboard 200	95
US Top R&B/Hip-Hop Albums	21

== Personnel ==
Credits adapted from AllMusic.

- João Daltro de Almeida – photo research
- David Blumberg – arranger
- Lawrence D. Brown – producer
- Rodger Carter – studio assistant
- Neil Citron – engineer, mixing
- The Corporation – arranger, producer
- Hal Davis – producer
- Jill Ettinger – product manager
- Berry Gordy Jr. – arranger, producer, executive producer
- George Gordy – producer
- Willie Hutch – vocal arrangement
- Eddy Manson – arranger
- Monique McGuffin – production coordination
- Alphonso Mizell – arranger, producer
- Fonce Mizell – arranger, producer
- Jeff Moskow – producer, A&R
- Ryan Null – photo coordination
- Gene Page – arranger
- Freddie Perren – arranger, producer
- Deke Richards – arranger, producer
- Ryan Rogers – design
- Tom Rowland – producer, engineer, mixing, A&R
- Glen Sanatar – studio assistant
- Doug Schwartz – mastering
- Andrew Skurow – tape research
- Bobby Taylor – producer
- David Van De Pitte – arranger
- Harry Weinger – A&R
- Bob West – arranger
