= Invincible (Michael Jackson album) =

2001 studio album by Michael Jackson

- Default color for the album. Green, red, orange, and blue-colored covers were also issued.

Studio album by Michael Jackson
- Released: October 30, 2001
- Recorded: October 1997 – September 2001
- Studios: The Hit Factory (New York City); Criteria (Miami); Marvin's Room (Los Angeles); Darkchild (Los Angeles); Record Plant (Los Angeles); Future Recording (Norfolk, Virginia); Sony (New York City); Record One (Los Angeles); A Touch of Jazz (Philadelphia); Brandon's Way Recording (Los Angeles); Capitol (Hollywood)
- Genres: R&B; pop; soul
- Length: 77:01
- Labels: Epic; MJJ
- Producers: Michael Jackson; Rodney Jerkins; Teddy Riley; Dr. Freeze; Andre Harris; Babyface; R. Kelly

Michael Jackson chronology
20th Century Masters – The Millennium Collection: The Best of Michael Jackson (2000)	Invincible (2001)	Love Songs (2002)

Singles from Invincible
- 1. "You Rock My World" Released: August 22, 2001; 2. "Cry" Released: December 5, 2001

Invincible is the tenth and final studio album by American singer-songwriter Michael Jackson, released on October 30, 2001, by Epic Records. The album features appearances from Carlos Santana, the Notorious B.I.G. (posthumous), Fats, and Slash. It incorporates R&B, pop, and soul, and similarly to Jackson's previous material, explores themes such as romance, isolation, and media criticism. It was the final album of original material he released before his death in 2009.

The creation of Invincible was expensive and laborious, featuring the work of ten record producers and over 100 musicians. Jackson started the multi-genre production in 1997 and did not finish until eight weeks before the album's release. With reported expenses of close to $30 million, it remains the most expensive album ever made. The lead single, "You Rock My World", was Jackson's final hit single during his career, reaching number ten on the US Billboard Hot 100. It was nominated for Best Male Pop Vocal Performance at the 2002 Grammy Awards.

Invincible debuted at number one on the Billboard 200 chart with first-week sales of 363,000 copies. It also reached number one in 13 other countries. Besides "You Rock My World", "Cry" was also released as a single, and "Speechless" and "Butterflies" were released as promotional singles. Invincible initially received average to negative reviews, becoming Jackson's most critically derided album. However, in retrospective reviews it has been viewed more positively, with praise for its musicality and production in particular.

In July 2002, following Sony's decision to abruptly end promotion for Invincible, Jackson openly condemned the CEO of Sony Music, Tommy Mottola. Jackson refused to tour to support the album, adding to his rift with Sony. Invincible was certified double platinum in the US and has sold over eight million copies. In 2009, following Jackson's death, it was voted by online readers of Billboard as the best album of the 2000s.

== Production ==
Prior to the release of Invincible, Jackson had not released any new material since the remix album Blood on the Dance Floor: HIStory in the Mix in 1997; his last studio album was HIStory (1995). Invincible was therefore viewed as Jackson's "career comeback".

Jackson began recording new material in October 1997, and finished with "You Are My Life" being recorded only eight weeks before the album's release in October 2001 – the most extensive recording of Jackson's career. Most of the final album was written within the last year of production, with only "You Rock My World", "Privacy", "Break of Dawn", "Speechless" and "Cry" dating to an earlier period. (Note: "Break of Dawn" is the earliest known recorded song to be included on the album, with work on it beginning in August 1998 at the Record Plant studio with producer Dr. Freeze.) The tracks produced with Rodney Jerkins were recorded at Criteria Studios in Miami, Florida. Jackson had shown interest in including a rapper on at least one song, and had said that he did not want a "known rapper". Jackson's spokesperson suggested a New Jersey rapper named Fats; after Jackson heard the finished product of the song, the two agreed to record another song together for the album.

Rodney Jerkins said that Jackson wanted to explore a new direction, describing it as "edgier". Jackson received credit for writing and producing a majority of the songs on Invincible. Aside from Jackson, the album features productions by Jerkins, Teddy Riley, Andre Harris, Andraeo "Fanatic" Heard, Kenneth "Babyface" Edmonds, R. Kelly and Dr. Freeze, and writing credits from Kelly, Fred Jerkins III, LaShawn Daniels, Nora Payne and Robert Smith. Invincible was the third collaboration between Jackson and Riley after Dangerous and Blood on the Dance Floor: HIStory in the Mix. Invincible was Jackson's tenth and final studio album recorded and released during his lifetime. It reportedly cost $30 million to make, making it the most expensive album ever made.

Invincible was dedicated to the fifteen-year-old Afro-Norwegian boy Benjamin "Benny" Hermansen, who was stabbed to death by a group of neo-Nazis in Oslo, Norway, in January 2001. The reason for this tribute was partly due to the fact that another Oslo youth, Omer Bhatti, Jackson's friend, was also a good friend of Hermansen. The dedication in the album reads, "May we continue to remember not to judge a man by the color of his skin, but the content of his character. Benjamin ... we love you ... may you rest in peace." The album is also dedicated to Nicholette Sottile and Jackson's parents, Joseph and Katherine Jackson.

== Artwork ==
For the cover artwork, Jackson was inspired by the 1992 photograph The Golden Boy by Scottish photographer Albert Watson, whom he hired to create imagery for Invincible. Watson shot Jackson through mirrors, creating a sequence of poses, some of which were used in the liner notes, which also feature a sketch by Jackson's friend Uri Geller. The cover shot was inspired by Watson's 1992 work, with Jackson in gold makeup and hair. However, a desaturated form was reportedly preferred by company executives. Four color variants were also released: red, orange, blue, and green. Jackson's right eye is pixelated, as is his first name and the album title.

== Music and lyrics ==
Invincible is an R&B, pop and soul record. The album's full length lasts over 77 minutes and contains 16 songs – fourteen of which were written (or co-written) by Jackson. It was noted that the album shifts between aggressive songs and ballads. Invincible opens with "Unbreakable"; the last line in the first verse recites the lyrics, "With all that I've been through/I'm still around". Jackson said "Speechless" was inspired by the joy he felt with a water-balloon fight with children. He said: "Fun inspires me. I hate to say that because it's such a romantic song. But it was the fight that did it ... Out of the bliss comes magic, wonderment, and creativity."

"Privacy", a reflection on Jackson's personal experiences, is about media invasions and tabloid inaccuracies. "The Lost Children" is about imperiled children. Jackson sings in a third person in "Whatever Happens". The song's lyrics, described by Rolling Stone magazine as having a "jagged intensity", narrate the story of two people involved in an unnamed threatening situation. Invincible features four ballads: "You Are My Life", "Butterflies", "Don't Walk Away" and "Cry". "Cry", similar to Jackson's "Man in the Mirror", is about healing the world together. The lyrics to "Butterflies" and "Break of Dawn" were viewed as "glaringly banal" and it was implied that they could have been written by anyone. "Threatened" was viewed as being both a storyteller and a "Thriller redux". The song "You Are My Life" is about Jackson's two children at the time, Prince and Paris. The song features Jackson singing, "You are the sun, you make me shine, more like the stars."

== Release ==
=== Singles ===
"You Rock My World"
Released as the lead single from Invincible, "You Rock My World" was produced by Rodney Jerkins and recorded in 1999 at the Criteria Studios in Miami.

The album spawned two official singles ("You Rock My World" and "Cry") and three promotional singles ("Speechless", "Butterflies" and "Unbreakable"), although all were given limited releases. "You Rock My World" was only released to radio airplay in the United States, peaking at number ten on the Billboard Hot 100. Internationally, where it was released as a commercial single, it reached number one in France, number two in Norway, Finland, Denmark, Belgium, and the United Kingdom, number three in Italy, number four in Australia, and five in Sweden and Switzerland. The second single, "Cry", was not released in the United States. It was only moderately successful, with the song's most successful territories being Spain, Denmark, France, and Belgium, charting at number six, sixteen, thirty and thirty-one.

"Butterflies" was released in the United States only to radio airplay. It reached number 14 on the Billboard Hot 100 and peaked at number two for five weeks on the Hot R&B/Hip-Hop Singles Chart. A three-track commercial single of the song was scheduled for release on January 15, 2002, but its release was canceled. A remix of the song by Track Masters was released promotionally which features singer Eve. Jackson had reportedly wanted "Unbreakable" to be the album's first single, but it was ultimately only issued promotionally. The song peaked at number 62 on the Romanian Top 100 chart. "Heaven Can Wait" charted at number 72 on the Billboard R&B/Hip-Hop Chart due to radio airplay without an official release; the song did not chart internationally.

=== Promotion ===
It was reported that the album had a budget of $25 million set aside for promotion. Despite this, however, due to the conflicts between Jackson and his record label, little was done to promote the album. Unlike with Jackson's post-Thriller studio albums, there was no world tour to promote the album; a tour was planned, but canceled due to conflicts between Jackson and Sony, and the September 11 attacks (the latter of which had also motivated many other artists to cancel their then-upcoming concerts in late 2001 and early 2002.) There was, however, a special 30th Anniversary Celebration at Madison Square Garden in early September 2001 to mark Jackson's 30th year as a solo artist. Jackson performed "You Rock My World" and marked his first appearance onstage alongside his brothers since the Jacksons' Victory Tour in 1984. The show also featured performances by Britney Spears, Mýa, Usher, Whitney Houston, Tamia, Backstreet Boys, 'N Sync, 98 Degrees, and Slash, among other artists. The show aired on CBS in November 2001 as a two-hour television special and was watched by 45 million viewers according to Nielsen.

The album's promotion was met with trouble due to internal conflicts with Sony Music Entertainment and Jackson, largely based on his ownership stake within the company and the contract Jackson had originally signed with the label back in 1991. The issue stemmed back during the production of Invincible when Jackson learned that the rights to the masters of his past releases, which were supposed to revert to him after 1999, would be retained by Sony until the end of the decade. When Jackson consulted the lawyer who had negotiated his contract, he learned that the same lawyer was also working for Sony, revealing a conflict of interest of which Jackson was never aware. Not wanting to sign away his ownership to Sony Music Entertainment, Jackson elected to instead leave the company shortly after the album's release. After the announcement, Sony moved to cancel all promotional and marketing efforts for Invincible; this included stopping the release of a 9/11 charity single that Jackson had recorded.

In July 2002, Jackson publicly alleged that the CEO of Sony Music, Tommy Mottola, was a "devil" and a racist who used his African American artists only for personal gain. He accused Sony and the record industry of racism, deliberately not promoting or actively working against promotion of his album. Sony disputed claims that they had failed to promote Invincible with sufficient energy, maintaining that Jackson refused to tour in the United States.

== Critical reception ==
Professional ratings
Aggregate scores
Source	Rating
Metacritic	51/100
Review scores
Source	Rating
Blender	2/5 stars
Entertainment Weekly	C−
Lexington Herald-Leader	3/5 stars
NME	6/10
Q	3/5 stars
Rolling Stone	3/5 stars
Slant Magazine	2.5/5 stars
The News & Observer	2/5 stars
The Village Voice	A−
The Wichita Eagle	3/4 stars

=== Contemporary ===
Invincible received mixed reviews by critics. At Metacritic, which assigns a rating out of 100 to reviews from mainstream critics, the album received a mixed score of 51 based on 19 reviews. David Browne of Entertainment Weekly, felt that Invincible is Jackson's "first album since Off the Wall that offers virtually no new twists" and stated that the album "feels like an anthology of his less-than-greatest hits". James Hunter of Rolling Stone critiqued that the album's later ballads made the record too long. Hunter also commented that Jackson and Riley made "Whatever Happens" "something really handsome and smart", allowing listeners "to concentrate on the track's momentous rhythms" such as "Santana's passionate interjections and Lubbock's wonderfully arranged symphonic sweeps". In a negative review for The New York Times, Jon Pareles suggested that the album is somewhat impersonal and humorless, as Jackson rehashes ideas from his past songs and is "so busy trying to dazzle listeners that he forgets to have any fun."

Other critics were more praiseful. Mark Beaumont of NME called Invincible "a relevant and rejuvenated comeback album made overlong", while Blender also found it "long-winded". Reviewing for The Village Voice, Robert Christgau said that despite being overlooked, Jackson's "skills seem undiminished [and...] he's doing new stuff with them—his funk is steelier and his ballads are airier, both to disquieting effect." He described the album's first three tracks as being the "Rodney Jerkins of the year". Nikki Tranter of PopMatters said that it is both innovative and meaningful because exceptional songs such as "The Lost Children" and "Whatever Happens" more than make up for overly sentimental songs like "Heaven Can Wait" and "You Are My Life". Q magazine said that it is an aurally interesting, albeit inconsistent, album. Precious Collins in The Ironton Tribune was highly praiseful of the album, writing, "Once again, Michael Jackson has succeeded" and further praising Jackson by saying that Jackson and his new album are "Invincible".

Invincible received one Grammy Award nomination at the 2002 ceremony. The album's song "You Rock My World" was nominated for Best Pop Vocal Performance – Male, but lost to James Taylor's "Don't Let Me Be Lonely Tonight". Due to the album's release in October 2001, it was not eligible for any other nomination from the 2002 Grammy Awards. In a retrospective review for The Rolling Stone Album Guide in 2004, Pareles said that Invincible showed Jackson had lost his suave quality to "grim calculation".

=== Retrospective reviews ===
Retrospective ratings
Review scores
Source	Rating
AllMusic	3/5 stars
The Rolling Stone Album Guide	1/5 stars
Tom Hull – on the Web	B+

In retrospective reviews, Invincible has gained more positive reviews. AllMusic editor Stephen Thomas Erlewine commented that it has a "spark" and "sound[s] better than anything Jackson has done since Dangerous." Erlewine noted that while the album had good material it was "not enough to make Invincible the comeback Jackson needed – he really would have had to have an album that sounded free instead of constrained for that to work – but it does offer a reminder that he can really craft good pop." Writing for PopDose, Mike Heyliger wrote "Invincible isn't the piece of shit most claim it to be. A leaner structure to the album and more sympathetic production would have resulted in a classic. But when measured against the radio junk that passes for pop-R&B these days, Invincible is stronger than ever." The track "Heartbreaker" has been cited as an early development of dubstep. In 2025, Billy Frost of Screen Rant called Invincible "ahead of its time" and a feat of musicality and production. In another article from the same publication, Molly Brizzell said, "Invincible is now getting its proper appreciation, especially as it continues to age like fine wine."

In the years after its release, Invincible has drawn praise for its vocal performances and production work. Reviews on sites such as AllMusic and Sputnikmusic highlighted tracks like "Break of Dawn" and "Butterflies" for their strong vocal arrangements and mid-tempo R&B style. Andy Healy of Albumism notes that while the album has issues with its extended runtime, its individual songs possess strong individual merits, pointing to the Carlos Santana collaboration "Whatever Happens" as a late-career high point, with Healy writing, "It does have more than its fair share of stellar moments that remind you just how gifted Jackson was as a singer and songwriter."

Jackson later admitted to have been very proud of Invincible: "It is tough because you’re competing against yourself. Invincible is just as good or better than Thriller, in my true, humble opinion. It has more to offer." Producer Jerkins also give his thoughts about the album: "There's stuff we didn't put on the album that I wish was on the album. My first batch [of beats] is what I really wanted him to do. I was trying to really go vintage, old school Mike. And that's what a lot of my first stuff was, that I was presenting to him. He kept 'Rock My World'. But he wanted to go more futuristic. So I would find myself at like junkyards, and we'd be out hitting stuff, to create our sound. I think Invincible needs to be re-released. Because something happened at the record company [Sony] that caused them not to promote it no more after we done [sic] put our heart and soul in it. He had about five singles on the album. But it came down to who can stop who [sic]. And he was caught up in that mess." In December 2009, following Jackson's death that year, readers of Billboard voted Invincible the best album of the 2000s.

== Commercial performance ==
Invincible was Jackson's first studio album since HIStory six years earlier. It debuted at number one on the Billboard 200, with first-week sales of 363,000 units, ousting rapper DMX's album, The Great Depression from the position. It was Jackson's fifth Billboard 200 number-one,and his fourth solo album to chart at number one in its first week; however, it sold less than HIStory in its opening week, which sold 391,000 units. According to The Gazette, Sony expected Invincible to sell 600,000 copies in the United States during its first week, despite an overall decline in record sales compared with the previous year. In its second week, after Britney Spears replaced Invincible with Britney as its number-one album, the former slipped to number three, selling 202,000 copies with a 45% drop. Invincible also charted at number one on the Billboard R&B/Hip Hop Albums Chart for four weeks. After eight weeks of release, in December 2001, Invincible was certified gold by the Recording Industry Association of America (RIAA) for shipments of five hundred thousand units. In the same month, the album was certified platinum for the sale of one million units. On January 25, 2002, it was certified two times platinum for the sales of two million units. In the United States, it was the 45th best-selling album of 2001 selling over 1.56 million units. As of 2009, Invincible had sold 2.4 million copies in the United States.

Invincible left the Billboard 200 in June 2002 after charting there for 28 weeks. Shortly after the release of the album, in a poll conducted by Billboard magazine, "an overwhelming majority" of people—79% of 5,195 voters—were not surprised by Invincible entering the Billboard 200 at number one. Billboard also reported that 44% agreed with the statement, proclaiming that Jackson was "still the King of Pop". Another 35% said they were not surprised by the album's ranking, but doubted Invincible would hold on for a second week at the top of the chart. Only 12% of people who responded to the poll said they were surprised by the album's charting debut because of Jackson's career over the past six years and another 9% were taken aback by the album's success, in light of the negativity that preceded the album's release. Invincible reached number one in 14 countries worldwide, including the United Kingdom, Australia, Belgium, Canada, Denmark, Finland, France, Malaysia, the Netherlands, Germany, Norway, Sweden and Switzerland. It also charted within the top ten in several countries, including Austria, Japan, Italy, New Zealand, and Spain.

Invincible was certified platinum by the British Phonographic Industry, for the sales of over 300,000 units in the United Kingdom. The album was certified platinum by the International Federation of the Phonographic Industry (IFPI) for the sales of 40,000 units in Switzerland. The IFPI also certified the album gold in Austria for the sales of 15,000 units. Australian Recording Industry Association certified Invincible two times platinum for the sales of 140,000 units in Australia. Invincible was the eleventh best-selling album of 2001 according to the International Federation of the Phonographic Industry with 5.4 million copies. According to different sources the album sold 8 million, or 10 million copies worldwide.

Following Jackson's death on June 25, 2009, his music surged in popularity. Invincible charted at number twelve on the Billboard Digital Albums Chart on July 11, 2009. Having not charted on the chart prior to its peak position, the album was listed as the ninth biggest jump on that chart that week. It also charted within the top ten, peaking at number nine, on Billboard's Catalog Albums Chart on the issue date of July 18. On the week of July 19, 2009, Invincible charted at number eighteen in Italy. Invincible peaked at number sixty-four on the European Albums Chart on the charts issue date of July 25. The album also charted at number 29 in Mexico in July, and 84 on the Swiss Albums Chart on July 19, 2009.

== Track listing ==
Invincible track listing
No.	Title	Writer(s)	Producer(s)	Length
1.	"Unbreakable" (featuring The Notorious B.I.G.)	Michael Jackson; Christopher Wallace; Rodney Jerkins; Fred Jerkins III; LaShawn Daniels; Nora Payne; Robert Smith	Jackson; Jerkins	6:25
2.	"Heartbreaker" (featuring Fats)	Jackson; Jerkins; Jerkins III; Daniels; Mischke; Norman Gregg	Jackson; Jerkins	5:10
3.	"Invincible" (featuring Fats)	Jackson; Jerkins; Jerkins III; Daniels; Mischke; Gregg	Jackson; Jerkins	4:45
4.	"Break of Dawn"	Jackson; Elliot Straite; Jerkins; Edward Riley	Jackson; Dr. Freeze	5:32
5.	"Heaven Can Wait"	Jackson; Riley; Andreao Heard; Nate Smith; Teron Beal; Eritza Laues; Kenny Quiller	Jackson; Riley; Heard (co); Smith (co)	4:49
6.	"You Rock My World"	Jackson; Jerkins; Jerkins III; Daniels; Payne	Jackson; Jerkins	5:39
7.	"Butterflies"	Andre Harris; Marsha Ambrosius	Jackson; Harris	4:40
8.	"Speechless"	Jackson	Jackson	3:18
9.	"2000 Watts"	Jackson; Riley; Tyrese Gibson; JaRon Henson	Jackson; Riley	4:24
10.	"You Are My Life"	Jackson; Kenneth Edmonds; Carole Sager; John McClain	Jackson; Babyface	4:33
11.	"Privacy"	Jackson; Jerkins; Jerkins III; Daniels; Bernard Belle; David Campbell	Jackson; Jerkins	5:05
12.	"Don't Walk Away"	Jackson; Riley; Richard Stites; Reed Vertelney	Jackson; Riley	4:25
13.	"Cry"	Robert Kelly	Jackson; Kelly	5:01
14.	"The Lost Children"	Jackson	Jackson; Bradley Buxer	4:00
15.	"Whatever Happens"	Jackson; Riley; Geoffrey Williams; Gil Cang; Jasmine Quay	Jackson; Riley	4:56
16.	"Threatened"	Jackson; Jerkins; Jerkins III; Daniels	Jackson; Jerkins	4:19
Total length:				77:01

Notes

- The rap verse by the Notorious B.I.G. in "Unbreakable" was originally from the second verse of the song "You Can't Stop the Reign" by Shaquille O'Neal.
- "Break of Dawn", "2000 Watts" and "Threatened" were excluded from the original release in China. In the Chinese edition of the box set The Collection released in 2013, all 16 tracks are included.

== Personnel ==
Credits adapted from Invincible album liner notes.

=== Musicians ===
- Michael Jackson – lead vocals (all tracks), background vocals (1–7, 9–12, 15–16), arranger (8, 14), multiple instruments (1, 4, 6, 16), programming (2, 3), drum programming (4, 13), orchestral arrangements and conducting (8), keyboard programming (9, 13, 14)
- Marsha Ambrosius – background vocals (track 7)
- Maxi Anderson – vocals (track 8)
- Gloria Augustus – vocals (track 8)
- Babyface – acoustic guitar, bass guitar, background vocals, drum programming, and keyboards (track 10)
- Tom Bahler – youth choir conductor (track 14)
- Emanuel "Bucket" Baker – drums (track 11)
- Rose Beatty – youth choir (track 14)
- Edie Lehmann Boddicker – youth choir (track 14)
- Robert Bolyard – youth choir (track 14)
- Norman Jeff Bradshaw – horns (track 7)
- Brandy – additional background vocals (track 1)
- Stuart Brawley – whistle solo (track 15)
- Mary Brown – additional background vocals (track 15)
- Tim Brown – vocals (track 8)
- Brad Buxer – drum programming (tracks 4, 13), keyboards (8), keyboard programming (9, 12, 14)
- David Campbell – string arrangement (track 11)
- Matt Cappy – horns (track 7)
- Martha Cowan – youth choir (track 14)
- Andraé Crouch – vocals (track 8)
- Sandra Crouch – vocals (track 8)
- Paulinho da Costa – percussion (track 13)
- LaShawn Daniels – background vocals (tracks 2, 11)
- Valerie Doby – vocals (track 8)
- Dr. Freeze – background vocals (tracks 4, 5), multiple instruments (4)
- Monique Donally – youth choir (track 14)
- Kevin Dorsey – vocals (track 8)
- Marja Dozier – vocals (track 8)
- Alfie Silas Durio – vocals (track 8)
- Nathan East – bass guitar (track 11)
- Jason Edmonds – choir (track 10)
- Geary Lanier Faggett – vocals (track 8)
- Vonciele Faggett – vocals (track 8)
- Fats – rap (tracks 2, 3)
- Lynn Fiddmont-Lindsey – choir (track 10)
- Kirstin Fife – violin (track 8)
- Judy Gossett – vocals (track 8)
- Harold Green – vocals (track 8)
- Jonathon Hall – youth choir (track 14)
- Justine Hall – youth choir (track 14)
- Andre Harris – multiple instruments (track 7)
- Scottie Haskell – youth choir (track 14)
- Micha Haupman – youth choir (track 14)
- Tess (Teresa) Escoto – youth choir (track 14)
- Gerald Heyward – drums (track 11)
- Tabia Ivery – choir (track 10)
- Luana Jackman – youth choir (track 14)
- Prince Jackson – narrative (track 14)
- Rodney Jerkins – multiple instruments (1, 4, 6, 16), programming (2, 3)
- Tenika Johns – vocals (track 8)
- Angela Johnson – vocals (track 8)
- Daniel Johnson – vocals (track 8)
- Zaneta M. Johnson – vocals (track 8)
- Laquentan Jordan – vocals (track 8)
- R. Kelly – choir arrangement (track 13)
- Peter Kent – violin (track 8)
- Gina Kronstadt – violin (track 8)
- Michael Landau – guitar (track 13)
- James Lively – youth choir (track 14)
- Robin Lorentz – violin (track 8)
- Jeremy Lubbock – orchestral arrangements and conducting (tracks 5, 8, 15)
- Brandon Lucas – youth choir (track 14)
- Jonathon Lucas – youth choir (track 14)
- Ricky Lucchse – youth choir (track 14)
- Melissa MacKay – youth choir (track 14)
- Alex Martinez – youth choir (track 14)
- Howard McCrary – vocals (track 8)
- Linda McCrary – vocals (track 8)
- Sam McCrary – vocals (track 8)
- Alice Jean McRath – vocals (track 8)
- Sue Merriett – vocals (track 8)
- Bill Meyers – string arrangements (track 10)
- Mischke – background vocals (track 2)
- Patrice Morris – vocals (track 8)
- Kristle Murden – vocals (track 8)
- The Notorious B.I.G. – rap (track 1)
- Novi Novog – viola and contractor (track 8)
- Nora Payne – background vocals (track 2)
- Que – background vocals (track 5)
- Teddy Riley – multiple instruments (track 5) additional background vocals (9)
- John Robinson – drums (track 13)
- Baby Rubba – narrative (track 14)
- Carlos Santana – guitar and whistle solo (track 15)
- Deborah Sharp-Taylor – vocals (track 8)
- F. Sheridan – youth choir (track 14)
- Slash – guitar solo (track 11)
- Andrew Snyder – youth choir (track 14)
- Sally Stevens – youth choir (track 14)
- Richard Stites – additional background vocals (track 12)
- Thomas Tally – viola (track 8)
- Brett Tattersol – youth choir (track 14)
- Ron Taylor – vocals (track 8)
- Michael Thompson – guitar (track 11)
- Chris Tucker – introduction (track 6)
- Mario Vasquez – additional background vocals (track 15)
- Johnnie Walker – vocals (track 8)
- Nathan "N8" Walton – choir (track 10)
- Rick Williams – guitar (track 15)
- Yvonne Williams – vocals (track 8)
- Zandra Williams – vocals (track 8)
- John Wittenberg – violin (track 8)

=== Production ===
- Executive producer: Michael Jackson
- Produced by Michael Jackson (all tracks), Rodney Jerkins (1–3, 6, 11, 16), Dr. Freeze (4), Teddy Riley (tracks 5, 9, 12, 15), Andre Harris (7), Babyface (10), R. Kelly (13)
  - Co-produced by Andreao "Fanatic" Heard and Nate Smith (track 5), Richard Stites (12)
- Recorded by Bruce Swedien (tracks 2, 3, 5, 7, 8, 14, 15), Teddy Riley (5, 9, 12, 15), Rodney Jerkins (6, 11), Stuart Brawley (1–3, 6, 8, 14, 16), Brad Gilderman (4, 6, 11, 13), Dexter Simmons (4, 6), George Mayers (4, 5, 9, 12, 15), Jean-Marie Horvat (6, 11), Brad Buxer (8, 14), Mike Ging (4, 13), Paul Boutin (10), Andre Harris (7), Humberto Gatica (4, 13)
  - Assistant engineers: Rob Herrera, Craig Durrance, Kevin Scott, Steve Robillard, Franny Graham, Richard Thomas Ash, Chris Carroll, Dave Ashton, Christine Tramontano, Vidal Davis (track 7)
- Rap recorded by Bob Brown (tracks 2, 3)
- Strings recorded by Tommy Vicari (track 10)
  - Assisted by Steve Genewick
  - Production coordinator: Ivy Skoff
- Mixed by Bruce Swedien (tracks 1–3, 5–9, 12, 14–16), Teddy Riley (4, 5, 9, 12, 15), Rodney Jerkins (1–3, 6, 11, 16), Michael Jackson (13), Mick Guzauski (13), Stuart Brawley (1–3, 16), George Mayers (4, 5, 9, 12, 15), Jean-Marie Horvat (11), Jon Gass (10), Humberto Gatica (4)
  - Assisted by Kb and EQ (track 10)
- Mastered by Bernie Grundman
- Digital editing by Stuart Brawley (tracks 1–4, 6, 8, 14, 16), Brad Buxer (8, 14), Rob Herrera, Harvey Mason, Jr. (4, 6, 11), Alex Greggs (2), Fabian Marasciullo (2), Paul Cruz (11), Paul Foley (1), George Mayers (5, 9, 12, 15)
  - Additional digital editing and engineering by Michael Prince
- Art direction: Nancy Donald, David Coleman, Adam Owett
- Cover design: Steven Hankinson
- Photography: Albert Watson
- Illustration: Uri Geller
- Make-Up and hair: Karen Faye
- Vocal consultant: Seth Riggs
- Archivist: Craig Johnson

== Charts ==
=== Weekly charts ===
Weekly chart performance for Invincible
Chart (2001–2002)	Peak position
Australian Albums (ARIA)	1
Australian Urban Albums (ARIA)	1
Austrian Albums (Ö3 Austria)	2
Belgian Albums (Ultratop Flanders)	1
Belgian Albums (Ultratop Wallonia)	1
Canadian Albums (Billboard)	1
Canadian R&B Albums (Nielsen SoundScan)	1
Danish Albums (Hitlisten)	1
Dutch Albums (Album Top 100)	1
European Albums (Billboard)	1
Finnish Albums (Suomen virallinen lista)	1
French Albums (SNEP)	1
German Albums (Offizielle Top 100)	1
Greek Albums (IFPI Greece)	3
Irish Albums (IRMA)	3
Italian Albums (FIMI)	2
Japanese Albums (Oricon)	5
Malaysian Albums (RIM)	1
New Zealand Albums (RMNZ)	4
Norwegian Albums (VG-lista)	1
Portuguese Albums (AFP)	8
Scottish Albums (Official Charts)	2
Spanish Albums (AFYVE)	2
Swedish Albums (Sverigetopplistan)	1
Swiss Albums (Schweizer Hitparade)	1
UK Albums (OCC)	1
UK R&B Albums (Official Charts)	1
US Billboard 200	1
US Top R&B/Hip-Hop Albums (Billboard)	1
Chart (2009)	Peak position
Australian Albums Chart	37
European Albums Chart	64
Hungarian Albums (MAHASZ)	20
Italian Albums Chart	18
Mexican Albums Chart	29
Slovenian Albums (IFPI)	18
Swiss Albums Chart	84
UK Album Downloads	41
US Catalogue Albums Chart	9
US Digital Albums Chart	12

=== Year-end charts ===
Year-end chart performance for Invincible
Chart (2001)	Position
Australian Albums (ARIA)	44
Belgian Albums (Ultratop Flanders)	72
Belgian Albums (Ultratop Wallonia)	24
Canadian Albums (Nielsen SoundScan)	73
Canadian R&B Albums (Nielsen SoundScan)	17
Danish Albums (Hitlisten)	37
Dutch Albums (Album Top 100)	37
European Albums (Music & Media)	44
Finnish Albums (Suomen viralinen lista)	23
French Albums (SNEP)	14
German Albums (Offizielle Top 100)	81
Swedish Albums (Sverigetopplistan)	45
Swedish Albums & Compilations (Sverigetopplistan)	62
Swiss Albums (Schweizer Hitparade)	28
UK Albums (OCC)	62
US Billboard 200	148
US Top R&B/Hip-Hop Albums (Billboard)	79
Worldwide Albums (IFPI)	9

Chart (2002)	Position
US Billboard 200	43
US Top R&B/Hip-Hop Albums (Billboard)	8

Chart (2009)	Position
Belgian Midprice Albums (Ultratop Flanders)	50
Belgian Midprice Albums (Ultratop Wallonia)	15

== Certifications and sales ==
Certifications for Invincible
Region	Certification	Certified units/sales
Argentina (CAPIF)	Gold	20,000^{^}
Australia (ARIA)	2× Platinum	140,000^{^}
Austria (IFPI Austria)	Gold	20,000^{*}
Belgium (BRMA)	Platinum	50,000^{*}
Brazil	—	70,000
Canada (Music Canada)	Platinum	100,000
Denmark (IFPI Danmark)	2× Platinum	40,000^{‡}
Finland (Musiikkituottajat)	Gold	16,621
France (SNEP)	Platinum	570,000
Germany (BVMI)	Platinum	300,000^{^}
Italy (FIMI) sales since 2009	Gold	30,000^{*}
Japan (RIAJ)	Platinum	300,000
Netherlands (NVPI)	Platinum	80,000^{^}
New Zealand (RMNZ)	Platinum	15,000^{^}
Norway (IFPI Norway)	Platinum	50,000^{*}
Poland (ZPAV)	Gold	35,000^{*}
Portugal (AFP)	Gold	20,000^{^}
South Africa (RISA) Physical sales	2× Platinum	100,000^{*}
South Africa (RISA) Digital sales + streaming	Platinum	50,000^{‡}
South Korea	—	58,840
Spain (Promusicae)	Platinum	100,000^{^}
Sweden (GLF)	Gold	40,000^{^}
Switzerland (IFPI Switzerland)	Platinum	40,000^{^}
United Kingdom (BPI)	Platinum	300,000^{^}
United States (RIAA)	2× Platinum	2,400,000
Summaries
Europe (IFPI)	2× Platinum	2,000,000^{*}
^{*} Sales figures based on certification alone.^{^} Shipments figures based on certification alone.
