= Heaven Can Wait (Michael Jackson song) =

2001 song by Michael Jackson

Song by Michael Jackson

from the album Invincible
- Released: October 30, 2001
- Recorded: 2001
- Genre: R&B; quiet storm; soul
- Length: 4:49
- Label: Epic
- Songwriters: Michael Jackson; Teddy Riley; Andreao "Fanatic" Heard; Nate Smith; Teron Beal; Eritza Laues; Kenny Quiller
- Producers: Michael Jackson; Teddy Riley; Andreao Heard (co.); Nate Smith (co.)

Licensed audio
- "Heaven Can Wait" on YouTube

Audio sample
- "Heaven Can Wait": file; help

"Heaven Can Wait" is a song by Michael Jackson, released on his 2001 album Invincible. It was written by Jackson, Teddy Riley, Andreao "Fanatic" Heard, Nate Smith, Teron Beal, Eritza Laues and Kenny Quiller.

In 2026, Essence magazine placed the song in their list of the "50 Greatest R&B Songs Of All Time" at number 20.

== Background ==
Inspired by Michael Jackson's ballad "The Lady in My Life" from his 1982 album Thriller, the song was first offered by co-writer Andreao Heard to Jackson's sister Janet and later R&B singer Kevon Edmonds, who had recorded his own version. Heard eventually forwarded the song to Teddy Riley through his assistant so it could be used for Michael Jackson's Invincible album. Riley wanted the song for his shelved solo album Black Rock, but agreed to let Jackson record it. Of Jackson's enthusiasm for the song, Riley reflected, "When I did that song with him, he held his heart and he said ‘Teddy, is this mine?’ I said, ‘It’s yours if you want it, Michael’ He’s like: ‘I want it, let’s go get it!’ He was so excited. I have a couple of witnesses that were in the room when he said ‘I want that song. I need that song in my life.’"

== Reception ==
The song received mixed reviews from music critics. Mark Anthony Neal of SeeingBlack.com praised the song, saying, "['Heaven Can Wait'] features arguably one of Jackson's best vocal performance since Thriller's 'The Lady in My Life'." Milena Brown of PRessure PR thought the song was "breathless", and "clearly did not get the same recognition it deserved". Bill Johnson from The Urban Daily listed "Heaven Can Wait" as one of several songs that kept Invincible "simple and smooth [and] that excel the most". Robert Hilburn of Los Angeles Times said the song was "a tale about turning away an angel who comes to take him to heaven because he wants to stay with his darling, seem aimed at the lower end of 'N Sync's fan base—a difficult stretch for a man of 43." NME gave a mixed review to the song, saying "around this point you realise that Jackson is no longer pioneering—this would be a good Usher ballad. It has classic 'if I should die tonight' love lyrics and swelling chords, but doesn't add up to all that much." The song charted for 16 weeks on the Billboard Hot R&B/Hip-Hop Songs, peaking at number 72 on April 27, 2002.

== Charts ==
Chart (2002)	Peak position
US Hot R&B/Hip-Hop Songs (Billboard)	72

== Certifications ==
Region	Certification	Certified units/sales
Mexico (AMPROFON)	Platinum	60,000^{‡}
New Zealand (RMNZ)	Gold	15,000^{‡}
^{‡} Sales+streaming figures based on certification alone.

== Personnel ==
- Written and composed by Michael Jackson, Teddy Riley, Andreao Heard, Nate Smith, Teron Beal, Eritza Laues and Kenny Quiller
- Produced by Michael Jackson and Teddy Riley
- Co-produced by Andreao Heard and Nate Smith
- Lead and background vocals by Michael Jackson
- Additional background vocals by Dr. Freeze and "Que"
- Orchestra arranged and conducted by Jeremy Lubbock
- Recorded and mixed by Teddy Riley, Bruce Swedien and George Mayers
- Digital editing by Teddy Riley and George Mayers
