= Andreao "Fanatic" Heard =

American musician

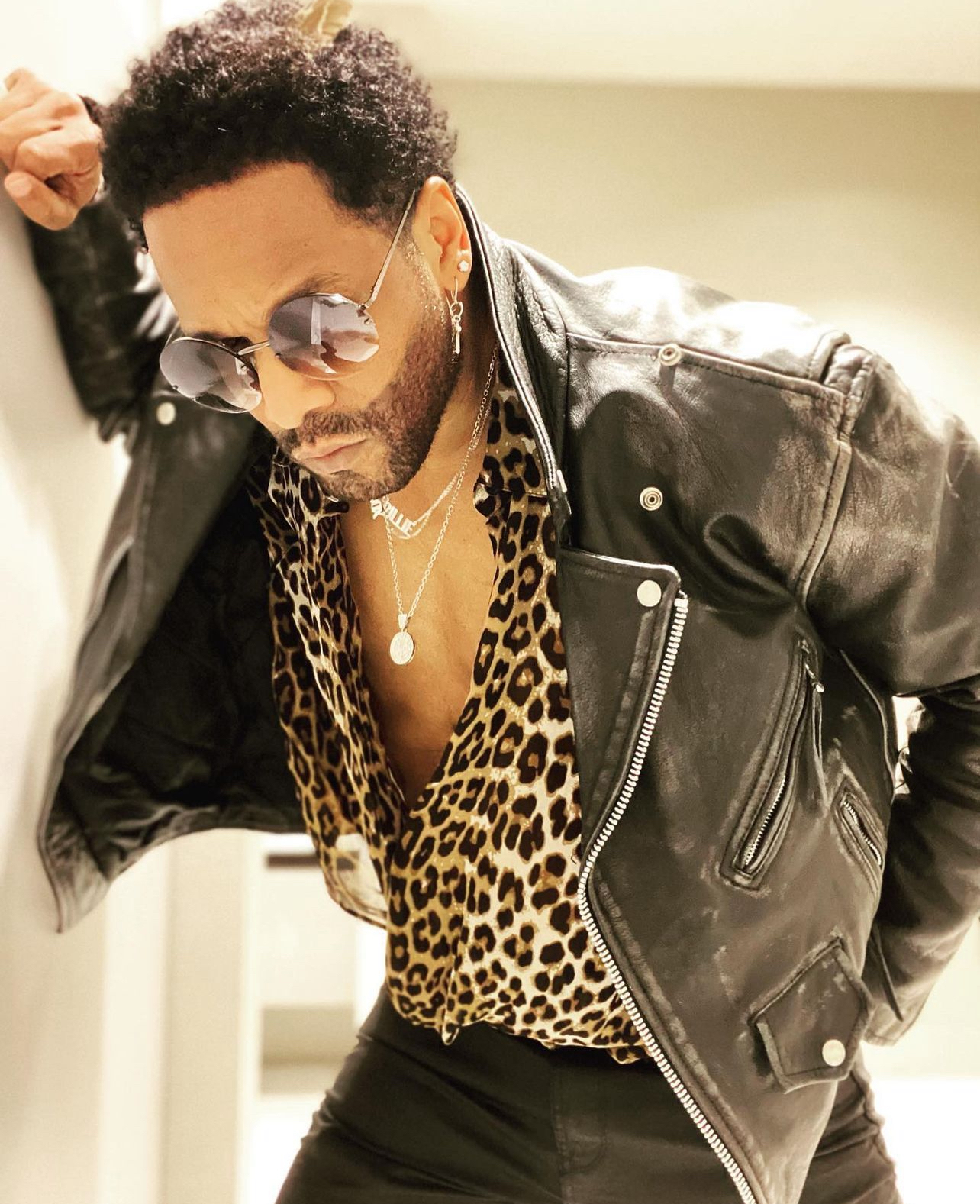

Background information
- Also known as: "Fanatic"; "Billie Lenox"
- Born: Andreao Heard; Greensboro, North Carolina, U.S.
- Origin: New York City, U.S.
- Genres: Pop; R&B; hip hop
- Occupations: Record producer; songwriter; singer
- Years active: 1987–present
- Labels: Bad Boy Records
- Formerly of: The Hitmen

Andreao "Fanatic" Heard (also known as Billie Lenox) is an American record producer from Greensboro, North Carolina.

== Career ==
Discovered by Vincent Herbert, Heard moved to New York City, where he connected with Sean Combs and became a part of his "Hitmen" production team, producing records for the Notorious B.I.G. and Ma$e.

In 1997, Heard produced "Crush on You" for Lil' Kim and "Y'all Know" for Will Smith's debut solo studio album, Big Willie Style.

In 2001, he produced the song "Heaven Can Wait" for Michael Jackson.

Heard received recognition from the Grammy association for his participation as a producer on Beyoncé's 2003 debut solo Grammy Award-winning album Dangerously in Love, Fanatic also contributed as a producer on Anthony Hamilton's 2013 Grammy nominated album Back to Love.

In 2019, Heard collaborated with Reynard Pringle, Mayor Nancy Vaughn and local artists in Greensboro, NC, to produce, A&R, and executive produce the Artists United to End Poverty album. The album features original material in various genres of music, as well as interludes of spoken word by spiritual leaders and community activists. It was released on September 9, 2019, jointly by Heard's non-profit and entertainment company, the Culture Pushers, and Sixthboro Entertainment. All proceeds from the sales of the album went to United Way of Greater Greensboro to help end local poverty.
