= You Rock My World =

Single by Michael Jackson

from the album Invincible
- Released: August 22, 2001
- Recorded: October 1999
- Studio: The Hit Factory Criteria Miami (Miami)
- Genre: Pop; R&B; disco; soul
- Length: 5:39 (album version with intro); 5:07 (album edit); 4:27 (radio edit)
- Label: Epic
- Songwriters: Michael Jackson; Rodney Jerkins; Fred Jerkins III; LaShawn Daniels; Nora Payne
- Producers: Michael Jackson; Darkchild

Michael Jackson singles chronology
"HIStory" / "Ghosts" (1997)	"You Rock My World" (2001)	"Cry" (2001)

Music videos
- "You Rock My World" (short version) on YouTube
- "You Rock My World" (long version) on YouTube

"You Rock My World" is a song by American singer Michael Jackson from his tenth and final studio album, Invincible (2001). It was released as the lead single from the album on August 22, 2001 by Epic Records.

"You Rock My World" peaked at number 10 on the US Billboard Hot 100 and was Jackson's last top-10 song in the United States in his lifetime; the posthumously released "Love Never Felt So Good" peaked at number nine in 2014. The chart position of "You Rock My World"' was attained solely on airplay alone, as no commercial single was initially issued in the United States. The track reached number one in France, Poland, Portugal, Romania, South Africa, and Spain. It also peaked within the top 10 in Australia, Austria, Canada, Denmark, Finland, Germany, Italy, the Netherlands, Sweden, Switzerland, and the United Kingdom. The song was nominated for a Grammy Award for Best Male Pop Vocal Performance at the 44th Grammy Awards.

As part of promotion for "You Rock My World", a music video was released. The video, which is thirteen-and-a-half minutes long, was directed by Paul Hunter and features Chris Tucker, Marlon Brando, and Michael Madsen. In the video, Jackson and Tucker portray men who are trying to gain a woman's affection. The video has been compared to Jackson's previous videos "Smooth Criminal" and "The Way You Make Me Feel". The music video received heavy airplay on the three major US music television channels: VH1, MTV and BET.

"You Rock My World" was performed only twice by Jackson, at Madison Square Garden in New York City at concerts on September 7 and 10, 2001, to celebrate Jackson's career as a solo artist. Footage of the performance was shown in the two-hour CBS television special titled Michael Jackson: 30th Anniversary Celebration.

== Background ==
"You Rock My World" was recorded by Michael Jackson for his studio album, Invincible (2001). The song was co-written and composed by Michael Jackson with Rodney "Darkchild" Jerkins and produced by Jackson and Jerkins. "You Rock My World" was officially released as the lead single from the album in mid-August 2001, by Epic Records. Prior to the single's official release, it was leaked to two New York radio stations on Friday, August 17. Immediately after the song's radio airplay, the radio stations received "a herd of [radio] callers asking for more." "You Rock My World" was first played on WTJM at 6 p.m., on a Friday, with WKTU airing the song 45 minutes later. Both stations had played the single every two hours until around 6 p.m. of the next day (Saturday). That Saturday (day after first spins), Jackson's record label, Epic Records, called the program director for both stations, Frankie Blue, who was also a friend of Jackson, and asked him to stop. Blue later recalled, "They informed me of the dangers of playing a song too early." He refused to say how the song came into his possession.

== Composition ==
"You Rock My World" is credited as being an uptempo pop, R&B, disco and soul song with vocal harmonies. The song is played in the time signature of common time in the key E minor, with Jackson's vocal range spanning from the tonal nodes of D_{3} to G_{5}. "You Rock My World" has a moderate tempo of 95 beats per minute. The chord progression in the song is Em7–Am7–D–Em7. The song's composition has been compared to Jackson's previous material with Quincy Jones from the late 1970s and 1980s as well as the disco-theme from Jackson's 1979 single "Don't Stop 'Til You Get Enough". Chris Tucker voices the vocal introduction of the song, while all the instruments heard on the track were played by Jackson and Rodney Jerkins. Lyrically, the song is about being in love, as well as the effect that it can have, as evident in the opening line: "My life, will never be the same, 'cause girl you came and changed, the way I walk, the way I talk; I cannot explain".

== Critical reception ==
"You Rock My World" received mixed reviews upon release. Praise was mainly directed at the song's composition, while dissatisfaction towards the song was expressed by critics because they felt that the track was not Jackson's best material. Stephen Thomas Erlewine of AllMusic listed "You Rock My World" as being a highlight for the Invincible album. Reviewer Andrew Hamilton, also of AllMusic, stated that, "If anybody other than Michael Jackson had released 'You Rock My World' with the tons of publicity and promotion it was accorded, it would have slam dunked the charts and been a multiple award winner. It sold well and got play everywhere, but too many critics panned the song and the album it came from as not being good enough for an artist on Jackson's level." Hamilton commented that people should "give Michael credit" because he was able to maintain a respectable career as a recording artist over the years of his later career.

James Hunter of Rolling Stone praised the song's vocal rhythms as being "finely sculpted" and "exquisite". He noted that the song shows similarities to Jackson's previous material with Quincy Jones. Catherine Halaby of Yale Daily News stated that the song "showcases the best of 'classic Michael'", and described the song as being "funky, catchy, upbeat, not too creepy". "You Rock My World" was nominated for a Grammy Award for Best Male Pop Vocal Performance at the 44th Grammy Awards, but it lost the award to James Taylor's "Don't Let Me Be Lonely Tonight".

== Chart performance ==
"You Rock My World" was commercially successful, generally charting within the top 10 on music charts worldwide. The song was one of Jackson's last hit singles in the United States in the final years of his career. "You Rock My World" charted in the top 20 on the Billboard Hot 100 on September 15, 2001. The following week, the song charted at its peak position, number 10. It became Jackson's highest-charting single since his 1995 number-one single, "You Are Not Alone". "You Rock My World" also charted at numbers seven and thirteen on Billboard's Mainstream Top 40 and Hot R&B/Hip-Hop Singles & Tracks charts, respectively. Notably, these chart positions were attained based on airplay alone, as no commercial single was issued in the United States. Fred Bronson, Billboard's chart expert at the time, remarked, "Certainly, if a commercial single had been available, it would have peaked higher – perhaps even at no. 1". The song also peaked at number two on the Canadian Singles Chart.

"You Rock My World" debuted on the United Kingdom Singles Chart at number two, which was its peak position in the country, on October 20. The song remained within the top 20 on the chart for four consecutive weeks, and remained within the top 100 for 15 consecutive weeks from October 20, 2001, to January 26, 2002. "You Rock My World" debuted on the French Singles Chart on October 13, 2001, at number one. The song remained at number one on the chart for three consecutive weeks, and remained within the top 20 for 10 consecutive weeks. The song debuted on the Dutch Singles Charts at number four on October 20, and the following week, charted at its peak position, number two. "You Rock My World" debuted on the Finnish Singles Chart on the 41st week of 2001, at its peak position, number two. After three weeks, the song fell off the charts.

The song debuted at its peak position, number two, in Norway in the 42nd second week of 2001. The song remained on the chart for six consecutive weeks, charting within the top 20. "You Rock My World" entered New Zealand charts on September 16, at number 31. After seven weeks, the song charted at its peak position, number 13, and remained on the chart for 12 weeks in 2001. "You Rock My World" debuted on the Australian Singles Chart at its peak position, number four. After the song charted within the top 50 for five consecutive weeks, it fell off the chart, and re-entered two weeks later at number 37, and fell off the chart for the second time on January 6, 2002. "You Rock My World" debuted on the Italian Singles Chart on November 11, at its peak position number three, and remained within the top 10 for four weeks in 2001. The song peaked at number two and four on the Belgium Flanders and Walonia charts in 2001. On the Austrian Singles Chart, the song debuted at its peak position, number nine, on October 21, and it remained on the chart for a total of eight weeks.

After Jackson's death in June 2009, "You Rock My World" re-entered music charts worldwide and re-entered Billboard charts for the first time in almost eight years. The song also peaked at number 62 on Billboard's Digital Songs chart on July 11, 2009. The song re-entered the United Kingdom Singles Chart on July 4, charting at number 97. The following week, the song charted at its peak position, number 60, and charted out of the top 100 after spending three weeks on the chart. "You Rock My World" re-entered the Australian Singles Chart for the third time on July 19, at number 50. The song remained on the chart for only one week.

== Promotion ==
In late August 2001, Jackson and Sony Music began a promotional campaign for "You Rock My World". As part of promotion for the single, as well as the album, Jackson made a public appearance by celebrating his 43rd birthday—one day late—by presiding over the NASDAQ market opening ceremony in Times Square on Thursday morning, on August 30, 2001. Jackson only performed "You Rock My World" twice. The only performances of "You Rock My World" was during two concerts in early September 2001, which was to celebrate Jackson's 30th year as solo artist, at Madison Square Garden. Tucker, who is part of the song's dialogue and video, was part of the live performance. Footage of the second concert on September 10 was shown in a two-hour television special, titled Michael Jackson: 30th Anniversary Celebration, which was aired on CBS in November of the same year.

== Music video ==
The music video for "You Rock My World" was directed by Paul Hunter and produced by Rubin Mendoza. The video was filmed from August 13 to 21, 2001, in Los Angeles, California, and was also released in 2001. The video, which is over thirteen minutes long, was described as being a short film.

The video consists of Jackson's and Tucker's characters trying to gain the affection of a woman (Kishaya Dudley) by subsequently following her around the neighborhood. Ultimately, a fight breaks out between Jackson and the gang members in a bar, who are ordered by their leader (Michael Madsen) to get rid of Jackson. Jackson, who had begun to perform before the woman, walks up the stage where his backup dancers have arrived. The gang leader causes a disruption by smashing a bottle across the counter, one of the gang members (Billy Drago) proceeds to taunt Jackson, challenging him. A dance scene begins, as a man lights his lighter and one of the gang members uses a knife on Jackson, but Jackson tosses him down. Jackson then punches him in the face, who knocks over a lamp, starting a fire. As the fire spreads, Jackson screams for Tucker, who had been dancing to the song, and he knocks out some of the gang members. During the escape, the woman who met Jackson approaches him outside the bar. The two share a kiss, and Tucker quickly rolls in with a low rider, signaling for Jackson and his new lover to escape, leaving the bar which is consumed in flames.

"You Rock My World" was thought to be the last music video to feature any participation from Jackson before the video for "One More Chance" was unearthed (his following videos would consist of archive footage of himself and others).

It has been compared to Jackson's previous 1980s music videos for his singles "Smooth Criminal" (which also was inspired by The Band Wagon), "Bad" and "The Way You Make Me Feel", all from his 1987 studio album, Bad. In the video, Jackson can be seen wearing a blazer and his traditional hat. The video features appearances from Marlon Brando, Michael Madsen and Billy Drago. The music video received heavy airplay on the three major US music television channels: VH1, MTV and BET. Also, Jackson was VH1's artist of the month in October 2001.

The video won an NAACP Image Award for Outstanding Music Video at the award show's 2002 ceremony.

The short version of the music video appears on Number Ones, and the long version appears on Michael Jackson's Vision.

== Remix ==
A remix of the song produced by the Trackmasters was included on Jay-Z's 2003 S. Carter Collection mixtape.

== Live performances ==
"You Rock My World" was performed live twice, during the 30th Anniversary Celebration concerts, which took place in late 2001. At the end of the second concert, Jackson was joined by Usher and Chris Tucker, who danced with him.

== Track listings ==
CD single
No.	Title	Length
1.	"You Rock My World"	5:39
2.	"You Rock My World" (radio edit)	4:25
3.	"You Rock My World" (instrumental)	5:07
4.	"You Rock My World" (a cappella)	4:47
Total length:		19:18

European, cassette and Australian single
No.	Title	Length
1.	"Intro"	0:32
2.	"You Rock My World" (album edit)	5:07
3.	"You Rock My World" (radio edit)	4:25
4.	"You Rock My World" (instrumental)	5:07
5.	"You Rock My World" (acappella)	4:47
Total length:		19:56

12-inch 1
No.	Title	Length
1.	"Intro"	0:32
2.	"You Rock My World" (album edit)	5:07
3.	"You Rock My World" (instrumental)	5:07
4.	"You Rock My World" (a cappella)	5:01
Total length:		15:47

12-inch 2
No.	Title	Length
1.	"You Rock My World"	3:45
Total length:		3:45

== Personnel ==
Credits adapted from Invincible album liner notes.

- Written and composed by Michael Jackson and Darkchild
- Produced and all musical instruments performed by Michael Jackson and Rodney Jerkins
- Lead and background vocals by Michael Jackson
- Intro by Chris Tucker and Michael Jackson
- Recorded by Brad Gilderman, Rodney Jerkins, Jean-Marie Horvat, Dexter Simmons and Stuart Brawley
- Digital editing by Harvey Mason Jr. and Stuart Brawley
- Mixed by Bruce Swedien, Lyndell Fraser and Rodney Jerkins
- Starring Michael Jackson, Chris Tucker, Marlon Brando, Michael Madsen, Billy Drago, introducing Kishaya Dudley
- Directed by Paul Hunter

== Charts ==
=== Weekly charts ===
Weekly chart performance for "You Rock My World"
Chart (2001–2009)	Peak position
Australia (ARIA)	4
Austria (Ö3 Austria Top 40)	9
Belgium (Ultratop 50 Flanders)	4
Belgium (Ultratop 50 Wallonia)	2
Canada (Nielsen SoundScan)	2
Croatia (HRT)	4
Denmark (Tracklisten)	2
Europe (Eurochart Hot 100)	2
Finland (Suomen virallinen lista)	2
France (SNEP)	1
Germany (GfK)	6
Greece (IFPI)	3
Hungary (Mahasz)	3
Ireland (IRMA)	4
Italy (FIMI)	3
Netherlands (Dutch Top 40)	3
Netherlands (Single Top 100)	2
New Zealand (Recorded Music NZ)	13
Norway (VG-lista)	2
Poland (ZPAV)	1
Portugal (AFP)	1
Romania (Romanian Top 100)	1
Scottish Singles Sales (Official Charts)	3
South Africa (RISA)	1
Spain (Promusicae)	1
Sweden (Sverigetopplistan)	5
Switzerland (Schweizer Hitparade)	5
UK Singles (Official Charts)	2
UK Dance (Official Charts)	7
UK Hip Hop/R&B (Official Charts)	1
US Billboard Hot 100	10
US Hot R&B/Hip-Hop Songs (Billboard)	13
US Pop Airplay (Billboard)	16
US Rhythmic Airplay (Billboard)	17
US Top 40 Tracks (Billboard)	13

Chart (2026)	Peak position
France (SNEP)	76
Global 200 (Billboard)	62
Portugal (AFP)	181
Russia Streaming (TopHit)	100

=== Year-end charts ===
2001 year-end chart performance for "You Rock My World"
Chart (2001)	Position
Belgium (Ultratop 50 Flanders)	84
Belgium (Ultratop 50 Wallonia)	29
Brazil (Crowley)	62
Canada (Nielsen SoundScan)	49
Europe (Eurochart Hot 100)	25
France (SNEP)	18
Ireland (IRMA)	76
Netherlands (Dutch Top 40)	96
Netherlands (Single Top 100)	64
Romania (Romanian Top 100)	16
Spain (AFYVE)	17
Sweden (Hitlistan)	77
Switzerland (Schweizer Hitparade)	49
UK Singles (OCC)	57
UK Urban (Music Week)	19
US Hot R&B/Hip-Hop Singles & Tracks (Billboard)	80

2002 year-end chart performance for "You Rock My World"
Chart (2002)	Position
Canada (Nielsen SoundScan)	155

== Certifications ==
Certifications and sales for "You Rock My World"
Region	Certification	Certified units/sales
Australia (ARIA)	Gold	35,000^{^}
Belgium (BRMA)	Gold	25,000^{*}
Canada (Music Canada)	Platinum	80,000^{‡}
Denmark (IFPI Danmark)	Platinum	8,000^{^}
France (SNEP)	Gold	260,378
Italy (FIMI)	Platinum	65,000
New Zealand (RMNZ)	2× Platinum	60,000^{‡}
Norway (IFPI Norway)	Gold	
South Africa (RISA)	Platinum	50,000
United Kingdom (BPI)	Platinum	600,000^{‡}
United States (RIAA)	Gold	500,000^{‡}
^{*} Sales figures based on certification alone.^{^} Shipments figures based on certification alone.^{‡} Sales+streaming figures based on certification alone.

== See also ==
- List of Romanian Top 100 number ones of the 2000s

== Bibliography ==
- Cadman and Halstead, Chris and Craig (2003). Michael Jackson The Solo Years. On-Line Ltd. ISBN 9780755200917.
