= Cry (Michael Jackson song) =

Single by Michael Jackson

from the album Invincible
- B-side: "Shout"; "Streetwalker"
- Released: December 5, 2001
- Recorded: 2000–2001
- Studio: The Hit Factory (New York City)
- Genre: R&B; gospel
- Length: 5:01 (album and video version): 4:02 (radio edit)
- Label: Epic
- Songwriter: Robert Kelly
- Producers: R. Kelly; Michael Jackson

Michael Jackson singles chronology
"You Rock My World" (2001)	"Cry" (2001)	"What More Can I Give" (2003)

Music video
- "Cry" on YouTube

Audio sample
- "Cry": file; help

"Cry" is a song recorded by American singer Michael Jackson that appears on his tenth studio album, Invincible (2001). The song was written and co-produced by R&B singer R. Kelly, who had previously written and co-produced Jackson's 1995 single "You Are Not Alone". It was released on December 5, 2001, under Epic Records as the second single from Invincible, and is Jackson's final single from a studio album. "Cry" is a contemporary R&B ballad with lyrics that highlight problems with the planet. The lyrics also urge people to unite to make the world a better place. Thus the track recalls previous Jackson songs that promote peace and environmentalism.

The song was released only in Europe with two B-side tracks; "Shout" and "Streetwalker". "Cry" received mixed reviews from music critics. The single had a moderate chart performance internationally, with its highest peak being number sixteen in Denmark, and its least successful charting country being Austria. The track was promoted with a music video, which was filmed by Nicholas Brandt. The video does not feature Jackson but shows people holding hands and standing side by side in a variety of settings, including a beach and a forest.

== Background ==
"Cry" was recorded by American singer Michael Jackson for his tenth and final studio album, Invincible (2001). The song was written by R&B singer-songwriter R. Kelly, who had previously worked with Jackson on his 1995 single, "You Are Not Alone"; Jackson and Kelly's collaboration on "Cry" is the second of what would be three collaborations. "Cry" was one of the first songs completed for the album. The track was produced by Jackson and Kelly. Outside of the United States, the song was released on December 5, 2001, as the second single from Invincible, under Epic Records. The single was released with two B-side tracks, "Shout" and "Streetwalker". "Shout" was a previously unreleased song that was originally intended for Invincible, but was replaced at the last moment by "You Are My Life". "Streetwalker" had previously appeared as a track on the 2001 special edition of Jackson's seventh studio album, Bad. Like "Shout", it was replaced last minute by "Another Part of Me".

== Composition ==
The themes of "Cry" are world issues such as isolation, war, and brotherhood. It also suggests if everyone pulls together as one, then they make a change to the world, with Jackson singing, "You can change the world/I can't do it by myself". Music critic Mark Brown of Rocky Mountain News felt that Jackson cries the lyrics "I can't do it by myself". The song's lyrics and themes are similar to the ones in Jackson's 1988 single "Man in the Mirror" and his 1992 single "Heal the World". "Cry" is composed in the key of A major and the song's time signature is common time. "Cry" has a moderate metronome of eighty four beats per minute. The single is built in the chord progression of A–G/A–A–A/G in the verses and A–A/G–D–A in the chorus. Jackson's vocal range spans from D_{3} to E♭_{5}.

== Critical reception ==
Professional ratings
Review scores
Source	Rating
AllMusic	1.5/5 stars

Jason Elias of AllMusic describes "Cry" as a moody and reflective piece of material reminiscent of Jackson's Quincy Jones-produced ballads for Bad, and indicates the song's themes are those of alienation and sorrow rather than love. He believes the strength of the strings, the competent backing vocals, and the keyboard figures prevent the listener from convulsing with laughter at Jackson's "oh-so-pained delivery" and interjections of "Hold on" or "Oh my!" Jon Pareles of The New York Times called the track the "change-the-world-song" and wrote that the single "applies its grand buildup to one of pop's strangest utopian schemes," which was asking everyone to cry at the same time, at which point Jackson may answer their prayers. Catherine Halaby of Yale Daily News felt that the song is a "less triumphant use of a contemporary's input" on the album.

NME music critic Mark Beaumont believed that Jackson "starts banging creepily on about" the lyrics which pertain to saving the children. Frank Kogan of the Village Voice noted that while "Cry" and another song from Invincible ("Speechless") are "very pretty", they give the impression that Jackson's "standing sideways, so as to let the beauty slide off him." Los Angeles Times staff writer Robert Hilburn wrote that the track "fills the social commentary role" of Jackson's "Man in the Mirror" (1988), while Hartford Courant rock music critic Roger Catlin believed that the single is a redux to Jackson's "Heal the World" (1991). Newsday staff writer Glenn Gamboa said that the song was "equally average" to other tracks on Invincible. James Hunter of Rolling Stone magazine wrote that R. Kelly "more or less succeeds with the kind of life affirming number" on the single.

Jim Farber of New York's Daily News wrote that in "Cry", Jackson "goes into his healing-the-world shtick, though rarely has he been this condescending about his role as universal savior." Chicago Tribune rock music critics Greg Kot believed that R. Kelly "reprises the formula of his big gospel-stoked anthem" ("I Believe I Can Fly") on the track. A journalist for The Wichita Eagle wrote that Jackson "shines on the sincere ballads" such as "Cry" and "Speechless". Pop music critic Thor Christensen of the Dallas Morning News described the single as being the musician's "latest batch of inspirational cotton candy." Francisco Cangiano of University Wire noted that the overall good songs from Invincible are "Heartbreaker", "Cry" and "Speechless". Pamela Davis and Gina Vininetto of St. Petersburg Times called the song "hubris- filled" and said that it was full of Jackson's "freaky messiah-savior complex."

== Chart performance ==
"Cry" was not released as a CD single in the United States, but it ranked at the bottom of Billboard music charts for three weeks within the country, peaking at number one at Bubbling Under R&B/Hip-Hop Singles. "Cry" was a moderate commercial success worldwide. On the UK Singles Chart, "Cry" debuted at its peak position of number twenty-five on December 22, 2001. The single remained on the country's chart for four consecutive weeks through January 2002. On the French Singles Chart, the track debuted at number thirty-seven on December 12, and peaked at number thirty in the succeeding week. On the Australian Singles Chart, the song charted for one week on December 12 at its peak position of forty-three. "Cry" did not chart on Belgian Ultratip Singles Chart, but did chart on the Belgian Wallonia music chart, debuting at number thirty-seven on December 15, and peaking at number thirty-one on January 12, 2002.

"Cry" charted on the Swedish Singles Chart for five consecutive weeks. It debuted at number fifty on December 21 and peaked at number forty-eight the following week. On the Swiss Singles Chart, "Cry" remained on the country's chart for six weeks, peaking at forty-two . The single's highest charting position was achieved in Spain, where it peaked at number 6 but only spent two weeks on the singles chart. In Austria, the single debuted on the country's singles chart at its peak of number sixty-five on December 16; the track spent two weeks on the chart. Regarding the song's chart performance, Halstead and Cadman wrote that it was a "setback for sure, but not a major one" for Jackson.

== Music video ==
"Cry" was promoted by a music video, or "short film", as Jackson would refer to it. The video was directed by photographer Nick Brandt, who had previously directed "Earth Song" (1995), "Childhood" (1995) and "Stranger in Moscow" (1996), all of which were featured on Jackson's HIStory: Past, Present and Future, Book I album. The video was filmed in six different locations, all were filmed in California. People featured in the video included members of a real life gospel group. The video begins with dozens of people of different ages, ethnicities and races holding hands. Long lines of people were stretched over mountains, across highways, in a forest and on the beach. Everyone stands in silence for a majority of the video. Following the bridge, everyone begins singing the chorus. Towards the final chorus, the group collectively clap their hands along with the song, taking hands once more as the song ends.

"Cry" is the only Michael Jackson video to be included on an enhanced CD of the single.

== Formats and track listings ==
UK enhanced maxi CD

1. "Cry" – 5:01
2. "Shout" – 4:17
3. "Streetwalker" – 5:49
4. "Cry" (short film in MPEG and QuickTime formats) – 5:00

UK 12" vinyl

- A. "Cry" – 5:01
- B1. "Shout" – 4:17
- B2. "Streetwalker" – 5:49

UK cassette single

- A1. "Cry" – 5:01
- A2. "Shout" – 4:17
- A3. "Streetwalker" – 5:49
- B1. "Cry" – 5:01
- B2. "Shout" – 4:17
- B3. "Streetwalker" – 5:49

Enhanced maxi CD

1. "Cry" – 5:01
2. "Shout" – 4:17
3. "Streetwalker" – 5:49
4. "Cry" (video) – 5:00

CD single

1. "Cry" – 5:01
2. "Shout" – 4:17

US 7" vinyl, 45 RPM

- A. "Cry" – 5:01
- B. "Cry" – 5:01

European promo CD single

1. "Cry" – 5:01

== Credits and personnel ==
- Written and composed by R. Kelly
- Produced by Michael Jackson and R. Kelly
- Lead vocal by Michael Jackson
- Percussion by Paulinho da Costa
- Keyboard and drum programming by Michael Jackson and Brad Buxer
- Choir arrangement by R. Kelly
- Drums by John "JR" Robinson
- Guitars by Michael Landau
- Recorded by Mike Ging, Brad Gilderman and Humberto Gatica
- Mixed by Michael Jackson and Mick Guzauski

== Charts ==
Weekly chart performance for "Cry"
Chart (2001–2002)	Peak position
Australia (ARIA)	43
Austria (Ö3 Austria Top 40)	65
Belgium (Ultratop 50 Wallonia)	31
Canada (Nielsen SoundScan)	33
Denmark (Tracklisten)	16
Denmark Airplay (Tracklisten)	17
Europe (European Hot 100 Singles)	27
France (SNEP)	30
Italy (FIMI)	21
Netherlands (Single Top 100)	39
Poland (ZPAV)	9
Romania (Romanian Top 100)	22
Spain (Promusicae)	6
Sweden (Sverigetopplistan)	48
Switzerland (Schweizer Hitparade)	42
UK Singles (Official Charts)	25
US Bubbling Under R&B/Hip-Hop Singles (Billboard)	1

== Bibliography ==
- Halstead, Craig (2007). Michael Jackson: For the Record. Authors OnLine. ISBN 978-0-7552-0267-6.
- Halstead, Craig; Cadman, Chris (2003). Michael Jackson the Solo Years. Authors OnLine. ISBN 0-7552-0091-8.
