= Cultural impact of Michael Jackson =

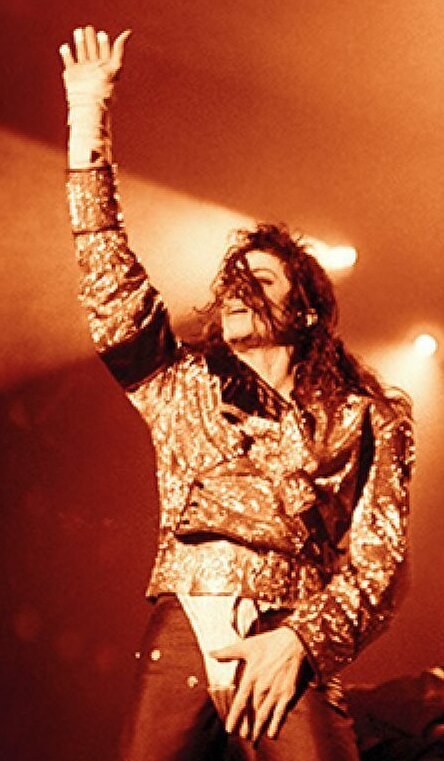
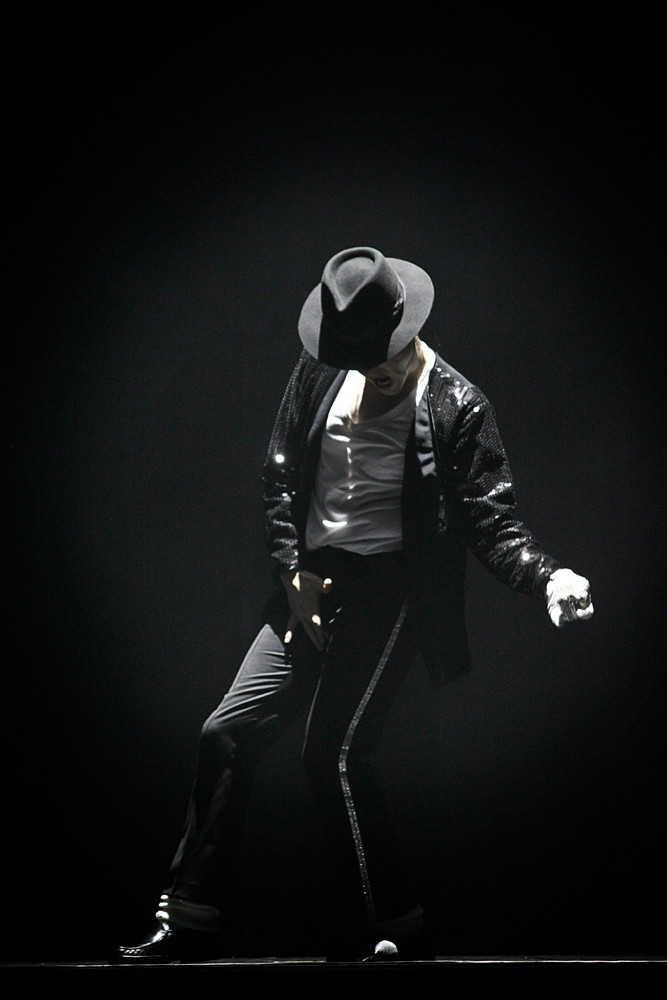
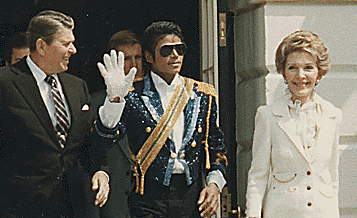
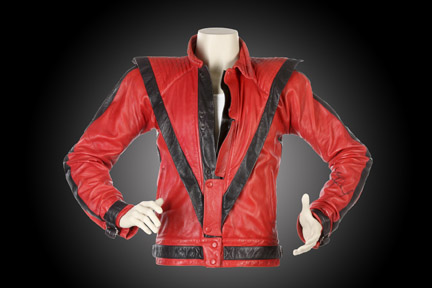
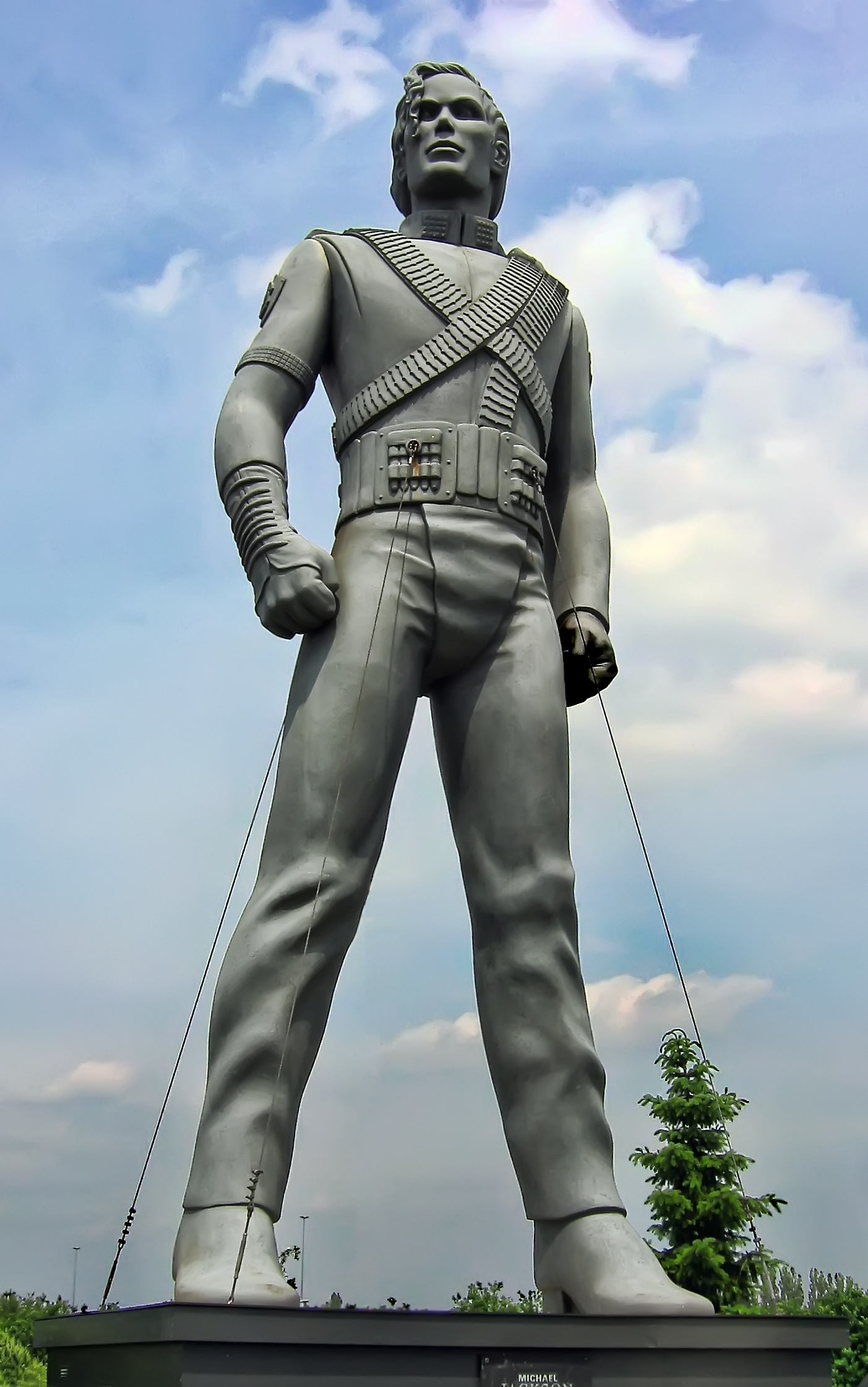
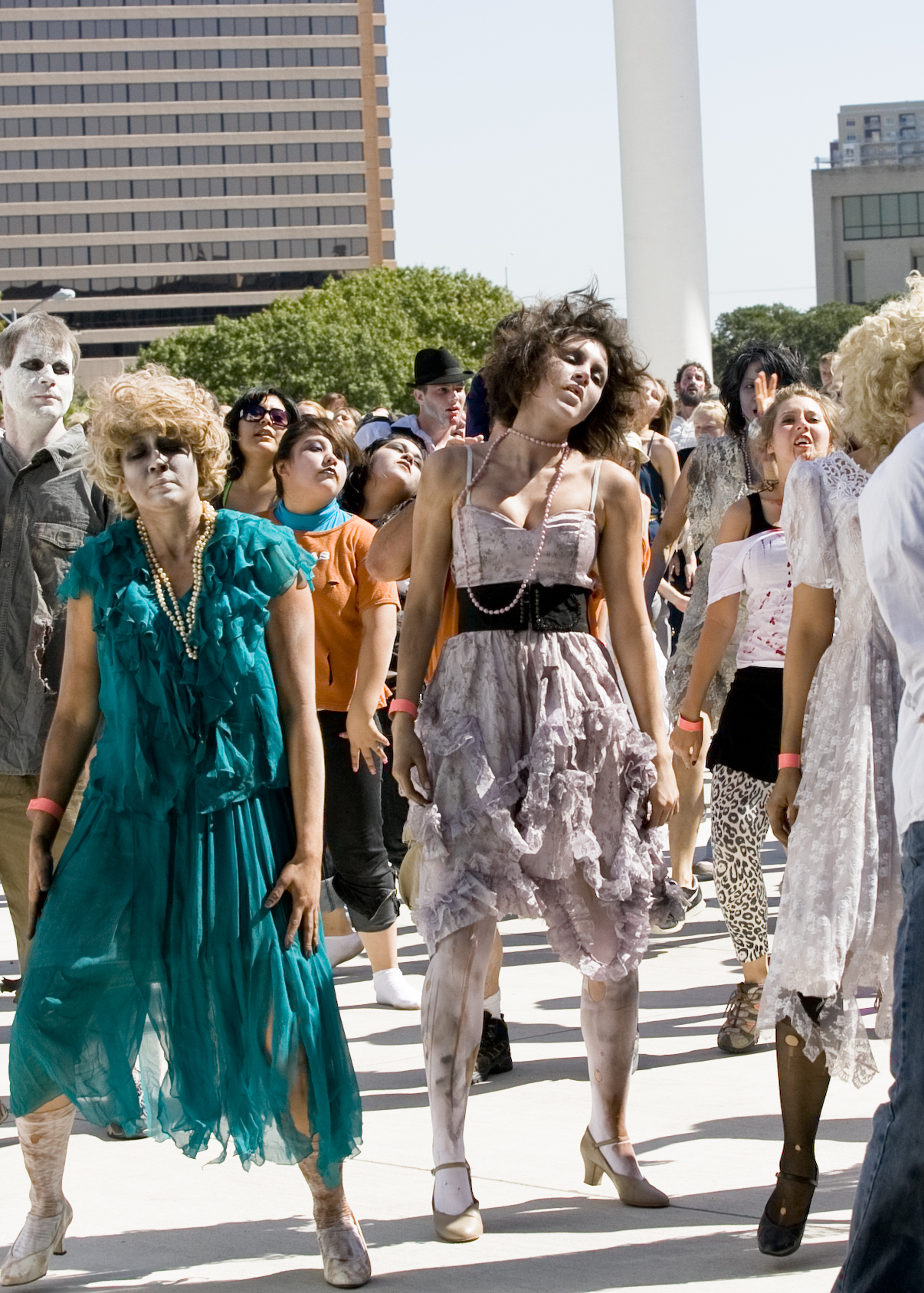
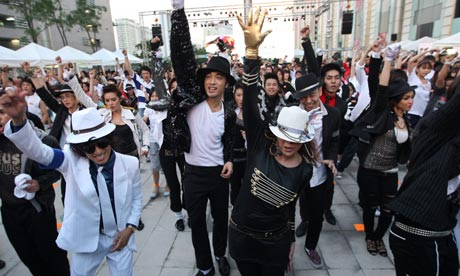
Clockwise from top: Michael Jackson live in Bucharest (1992), German Michael Jackson impersonator Andre Santisi performing "Billie Jean", Thriller jacket, Michael Jackson monument in the Netherlands, fans in Thailand dancing to "Beat It", Thrill the World event in Texas, Jackson's Romanian postal stamps, Jackson with former President Ronald Reagan and wife Nancy (1984).

American singer Michael Jackson is widely regarded as one of the most significant cultural figures of the 20th century. Often considered the greatest entertainer of all time, Jackson broke racial barriers in the United States and profoundly influenced the evolution of pop music, earning him the title of "King of Pop". He is one of the best-selling music artists in history, having sold over 500 million records worldwide.

Jackson's unparalleled success spans multiple decades; his albums Off the Wall (1979), Thriller (1982), Bad (1987), Dangerous (1991), and HIStory (1995) rank amongst the best-selling of all time; Thriller remains the best-selling album in history. Guinness World Records named him the most successful entertainer of all time. His achievements in the 1980s helped desegregate popular music in the United States and introduced an era of multiculturalism globally. Through his dance, fashion, and music videos, Jackson proliferated visual performance for musical artists. He has influenced hundreds of musicians, with songs that are among the most covered and sampled in music history. His influence extended to inspiring a vast array of trends and raising awareness for social causes around the world; as a result, Jackson is widely seen as one of the most famous figures in history. Before he died, Jackson was received by over 30 world leaders. Jackson's global brand resulted in celebrity products and commemorations such as video games, documentaries, and monuments.

The popularity of Michael Jackson began as a child star in the 1960s, when he was introduced as the lead singer of the Jackson 5, a band formed with his older brothers. The group was recognized by U.S. Congress for their contribution to American youth culture, and the American public embraced Jackson to a degree not afforded a child star since the height of Shirley Temple in the 1930s. In the early 1980s, Jackson became a dominant figure in popular culture and the first African-American entertainer to have a strong crossover fanbase on music television. As he became a rising solo star, his music videos, including those for "Beat It", "Billie Jean", and "Thriller" from his album Thriller (1982), are credited with breaking several racial barriers both in the United States and worldwide, transforming the medium into an art form and promotional tool. The popularity of these videos helped bring the television channel MTV to fame. Before Thriller, timely layoffs were occurring for radio and music record companies, which both suffered during a four-year unemployment high between 1978 and 1982 due to the early 1980s recession. Jackson's world record sales and achievements are credited with revolutionizing the music industry by initiating marketing plans on blockbuster albums with an emphasis on video presentation focus going forward.

Moonwalk, a signature move of Jackson that he named

Further development through his videos and live performances, Jackson popularized street dance moves, particularly his signature move the moonwalk, patented the anti-gravity lean and attracted a cult of impersonators throughout the world. He is credited with helping to spread dance to a global audience and having an authority comparable to dance icons such as to Fred Astaire and Sammy Davis Jr. With an aesthetic borrowed from the musical film tradition, the Thriller videos created a sub-industry of choreographers as other pop artists deliberately sought to produce sophisticated dance-oriented promotional films and concerts for music on an unprecedented scale. In the latter half of the 1980s, Jackson's personal idiosyncrasies and changing appearance became the source of fascination for the tabloid media, a phenomenon furthered by the child abuse accusations leveled against him in 1993. These eccentricities and controversies sparked major debate from both comedic and critical perspectives. As his last two albums focused more on social commentary, he matchingly pioneered charitable causes as a philanthropist, putting his wealth into several hospitals and nonprofits in various countries. His philanthropy has been described as having set a standard for celebrity charity.

Jackson influenced a wide range of subjects, from celebrity studies, music and dance production, to visual culture, to gender and sexuality studies, and many more, including ones not directly related to his profession. Various life events inspired further discussion while many cultural films, televisions, books reference or depict Jackson on a global scale to present day. According to a study published in The Journal of Pan African Studies in 2010, his influence extended to academia, with references to the singer in literature concerning mass communications, psychology, medicine, engineering, and chemistry. He inspired a wealth of products exploring his public image, some of which have been displayed, examined, or auctioned; an example being reinterpretation by leading artists in the 2018 exhibition Michael Jackson: On the Wall at London's National Portrait Gallery. The British Council named Jackson on its list of "80 Moments that Shaped the World" regarding international cultural relations. Since Jackson's death, there have been many tribute shows performed by fans in concert, Cirque du Soleil or Broadway theatre which garnered millions of tickets worldwide.

== Performing arts ==
=== Music ===
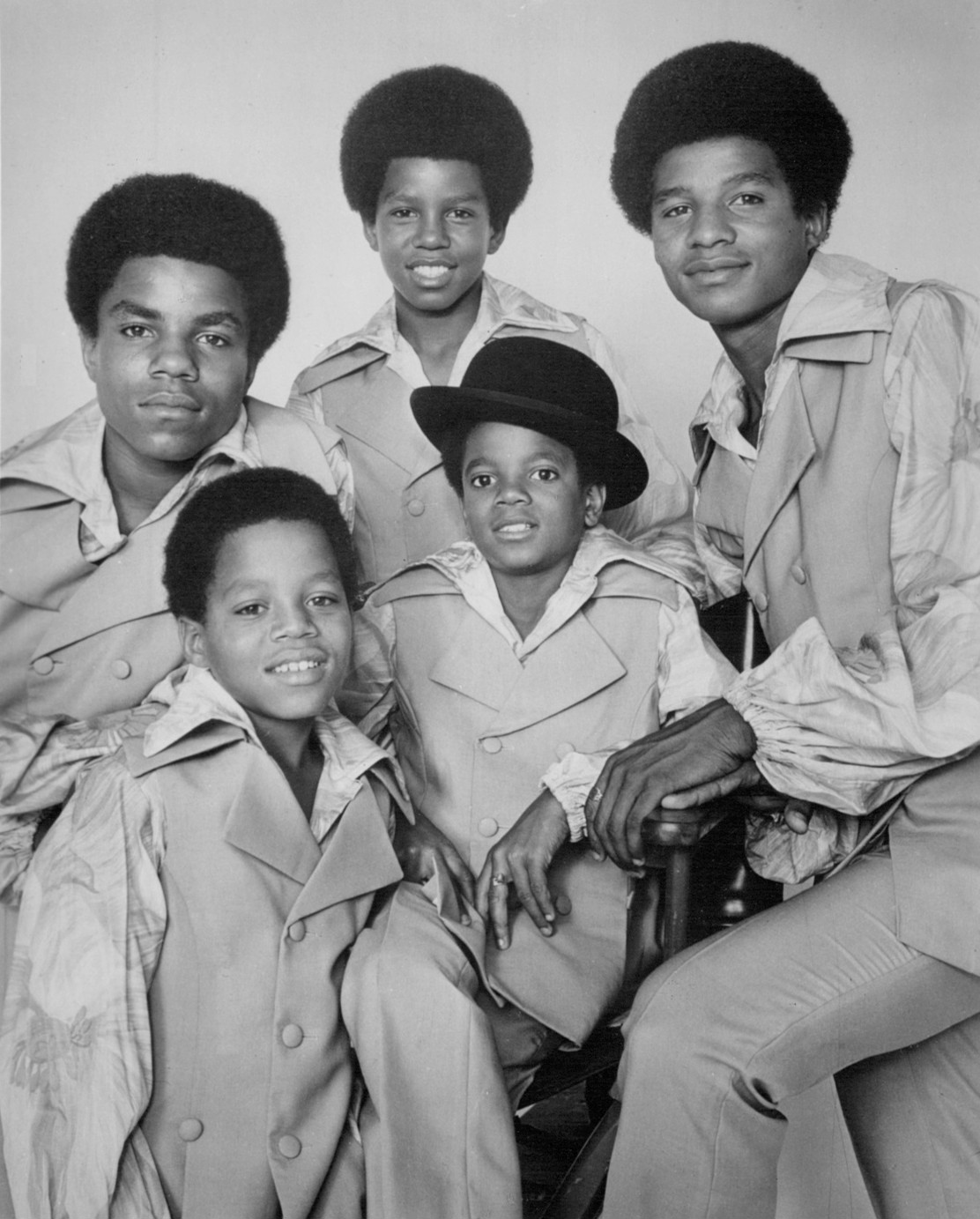
Jackson (center, wearing a hat) with the Jackson 5 in 1969

As the lead singer and youngest member of the Jackson 5 from the late 1960s, Michael Jackson was the group's focal point for the media. They became one of the most popular family acts in pop music, with many hit records, a self-titled cartoon series and, from 1976, a self-titled variety show. He and his brothers were widely viewed as role models for contemporary society; the press celebrated them as a family founded on core religious beliefs and a strong work ethic, and in 1972, the Jackson 5 received a commendation from the U.S. Congress in recognition of the brothers' contribution to American youth culture. Amid this recognition, according to the editors of Rolling Stone's Encyclopedia of Rock & Roll, Jackson captivated the nation on a level not seen in a child star since Shirley Temple in the 1930s. (Note: Music academic Jacqueline Edmondson states that "The [Jackson] family have left an indelible mark on American popular music and culture through their music, acting, and influence on fashion and pop culture.")

In the description of author and pop culture critic Joseph Vogel, Jackson's album Thriller (1982) changed the direction of popular music. Jay Cocks, writing for Time magazine in 1984, said the album was "a thorough restoration of confidence, a rejuvenation [and] its effect on listeners, especially younger ones, was nearer to a revelation". It reintroduced black music to mainstream American radio; until then, the so-called "restrictive special-format programming", a genre-driven radio content philosophy which segregated music by race, introduced in the mid-1970s, limited the airplay of black music. Jackson, whose success was compared to that of Elvis Presley and the Beatles, appeared on the cover of Time. The album established Jackson as the world's top entertainment star and, in Stanley's recollection, "you'd expect to see a copy in the corner of any room, in any town, in any country in the world." Its unprecedented commercial success also provided the model for record companies recovering from the economic downturn of the late 1970s, whereby they focused on promoting a blockbuster album at the expense of releases by their lesser-known acts. Amid his description of the cultural phenomenon that Jackson represented in 1984, Cocks deemed him "A one-man rescue team for the music business ... A singer who cuts across all boundaries of taste and style, and color too." In 2008, the Library of Congress added Thriller to the National Recording Registry for its "stratospheric national and international success".

Jackson's music has been extensively covered by other artists of various styles, including Mariah Carey, Miles Davis, Willie Nelson and Alien Ant Farm. Artists who often mention Jackson in their music include Kanye West, Lil Wayne, LL Cool J, Rick Ross and Drake. According to Jacqueline Edmondson, writing in 2013, Jackson "redefined the term pop star" and his cultural legacy is reflected "in the very landscape of the modern, genre-crossing, multimedia pop music scene".

=== Dance and choreography ===
From the start of his performing career, Jackson incorporated dance moves into a stage presence that invited comparison with James Brown, Sammy Davis Jr., Mick Jagger, and Tina Turner. He went on to popularize street dances such as popping, locking, the robot, and his signature move, the moonwalk. Professor of performance studies at NYU Tavia Nyongo said that "No dancer has done as much to popularize the art form since Fred Astaire."

Jackson first performed the moonwalk when miming to "Billie Jean" at the close of the Motown 25 television special, which aired in May 1983. An international audience of around 50 million viewed the performance which, according to Rolling Stone, "energize[d] the music scene once again and set in motion all the forces that would go on to shape the popular culture of the 1980s". Media studies academic Jaap Kooijman writes that, although the moonwalk was an additional element in his routine at Motown 25, Jackson's replication of his dancing from the already popular "Billie Jean" music video presented a new phenomenon whereby a concert performance involved re-creating a video sequence and the music, including live vocals, ceded to visual imagery such as dance.

Jackson is credited with helping to spread dance to a global audience. Nigel Lythgoe, executive producer and judge on the TV dance competition So You Think You Can Dance, said that "countless" applicants had begun dancing because of Jackson. Ronni Favors, a director at the Alvin Ailey American Dance Theater, said Jackson was "a trailblazer for his generation", setting the expectation that future pop stars, such as Britney Spears and Beyoncé, integrate dance in their performances. In Japan, as a result of him opening his Bad World Tour there, Jackson is credited with reshaping J-pop's choreography. He also influenced India's Bollywood film scene, where dance sequences, films and soundtrack music all borrowed heavily from Jackson's work.

Following the singer's death in 2009, Andy Gill of The Independent said that through Jackson's example, "the Eighties became the decade of dance stars like Prince and Madonna, neither of whom would have been able to establish themselves as quickly as they did had Jackson not moonwalked across the room and kicked down the door for them." Gill added that with thousands of dancers imitating his moves in the moonwalk and the zombie, Jackson became "the most significant mainstream dance icon since the mid-century heyday of Fred Astaire, Gene Kelly and Sammy Davis Jr." (Note: In her 2016 novel Swing Time, Zadie Smith refers to Jackson as part of a seamless dance tradition, writing: "A great dancer has no time, no generation, he moves eternally through the world, so that any dancer in any age may recognise him. Picasso would be incomprehensible to Rembrandt, but Nijinsky would understand Michael Jackson.") Jackson was posthumously inducted into the National Museum of Dance and Hall of Fame in 2010.

== Music videos ==
Jackson had a lasting influence on the music video medium, starting with the clips for his Thriller singles "Billie Jean" and "Beat It". At the time most music videos had small budgets, low production values and little narrative. Jackson's videos began a transformation, replacing low-budget montage promos with elaborate short films consisting of in-depth narratives and sophisticated visuals, and taking the form of a mini musical. Jackson collaborated with several Hollywood directors on these works, including John Landis, Martin Scorsese, Spike Lee, David Fincher and John Singleton. "Beat It" featured unusually sophisticated choreography and, according to The Rolling Stone Encyclopedia of Rock & Roll, created a "music video subindustry of dancers and choreographers" such as Paula Abdul and Toni Basil.

The "Thriller" video—which gained a commercial release as Michael Jackson's Thriller—was unusually long (at 14 minutes) and took the form of a short film presentation. It features Jackson dancing with zombies and cost more than $1 million to produce. The film sealed MTV's position as a cultural force, helped dismantle racial barriers for black artists, revolutionized music video production, popularized making-of documentaries, and drove the rental and sales of VHS tapes. It has been described as the most influential music video in history; according to Edmondson, the "Thriller" video "is credited with single-handedly revolutionizing the landscape of pop music". Former MTV executive Nina Blackwood said, "[After 'Thriller'] we saw videos get more sophisticated—more story lines, way more intricate choreography. You look at those early videos and they were shockingly bad." Music video director Brian Grant credited "Thriller" as the turning point when music videos became a "proper industry". Gill recognized the Landis-directed film as a work that "altered forever the balance of sound and vision in the entertainment industry", adding: "Prior to Jackson, music alone had been the premier conduit of cultural dissemination among young people; after Jackson, it was merely the accompaniment to a dance routine, one small element in a larger spectacle." In December 2009, the video was inducted into the National Film Registry. "Thriller" has become closely associated with Halloween. The dance is performed in major cities around the world; the largest zombie dance included 12,937 dancers, in Mexico City. A YouTube video of more than 1,500 prisoners performing the dance in the Philippines had attracted 14 million views as of 2010.

Director Guillermo del Toro cites "Thriller" as an early inspiration. He said, "I realized that the people actually making these monsters were not the men I saw in the old books in lab coats. It's young guys with long hair and rock 'n' roll shirts, who I could relate to."

With MTV's initial broadcast of the film in December 1983, the debut of a new Jackson video became a major media event. MTV's belated support signaled the end of its rock-only policy and, due to the popularity the film gained for the network, raised concerns for its commercial survival. Bob Pittman, MTV's co-founder and CEO, said that "'Thriller' brought people to MTV for the first time, and it made them stay and watch it again and again. Now everybody was into MTV." This development ensured an upswing in the economics of the music industry after its sharp decrease in revenue since the late 1970s and, with the expansion of MTV's reach in 1984, new music stars being created through the video medium as well as established acts such as Bruce Springsteen embracing high-production music videos. The Rolling Stone editors state that Jackson's breakthrough was the "turning point" for MTV, initiating a transformation in which the network "not only revolutionized virtually every aspect of the music business, from promotion to concert tours, but changed the way listeners/viewers related to music and to artists". According to Landis, the "Thriller" video project was the subject of a course at Harvard Business School, although he said this study incorrectly highlighted the role of business and legal professionals rather than Jackson's creative vision.

According to The Rolling Stone Encyclopedia of Rock & Roll, the $160,000 budget for Jackson's "Beat It" video was considered an "exorbitant" amount; the video for his 1995 single "Scream" cost an estimated $4 million, making it the most expensive clip in pop music history at that time. MTV's premiere of Jackson's "Black or White" single was broadcast simultaneously in 27 countries on November 14, 1991, and was watched by an estimated 500 million people. As of 2006, this remained the largest audience to view a music video.

== Television appearances ==
Date	Broadcast	Region	Total viewers	Type	Ref.
September 11, 1971	The Jackson 5ive - Episode I	United States	25,000,000	TV Show	
May 16, 1983	Motown 25: Yesterday, Today, Forever	United States	47,000,000	Concert	
February 26, 1984	26th Annual Grammy Awards (Thriller)	United States	51,600,000	Award Show	
March 1984	Pepsi: A New Generation	Worldwide	500,000,000	Commercial	
May 17–21, 1988	Pepsi TV Special "Pozner in America."	Soviet Union	150,000,000	Mini-Series	
November 14, 1991	Black or White (Music Video)	United States	33,000,000	Music Video	
November 14, 1991	Black or White (Music Video)	Worldwide	500,000,000	Music Video	
November 20, 1992	The Jacksons: An American Dream	United States	38,000,000	Biopic	
January 31, 1993	Super Bowl XXVII halftime show	United States	133,400,000	Concert	
January 31, 1993	Super Bowl XXVII halftime show	Worldwide	1,300,000,000	Concert	
February 10, 1993	Michael Jackson Talks ... to Oprah	United States	90,000,000	Interview	
June 14, 1995	ABC Primetime Live: Michael Jackson / Lisa Marie Presley	Worldwide	500,000,000	Interview	
November 5, 1995	Wetten, dass..?: Michael Jackson performs the Earth Song	Germany	18,000,000	TV Show	
March 1996	They Don't Care About Us (Music Video)	Worldwide	200,000,000	Music Video	
May 8, 1996	World Music Awards (w/Performance by Michael Jackson)	Worldwide	900,000,000	Award Show	
May 10, 2000	World Music Awards (Artist of the Millennium Ceremony)	Worldwide	900,000,000	Award Show	
November 13, 2001	Michael Jackson: 30th Anniversary Celebration	United States	45,000,000	Concert	
February 3–6, 2003	Living with Michael Jackson	USA / UK	53,000,000	Documentary	
December 15, 2003	Our Son: Michael Jackson	Worldwide	1,000,000,000	Documentary	
December 25, 2003	60 Minutes: Michael Jackson interview w/Ed Bradley	United States	19,700,000	Interview	
July 6, 2009	Michael Jackson: Memorial Service	Worldwide	2,500,000,000	Funeral	
	Total views	Worldwide	8,727,000,000		
	Average viewership per broadcast	United States	53,200,000		

== Fashion ==
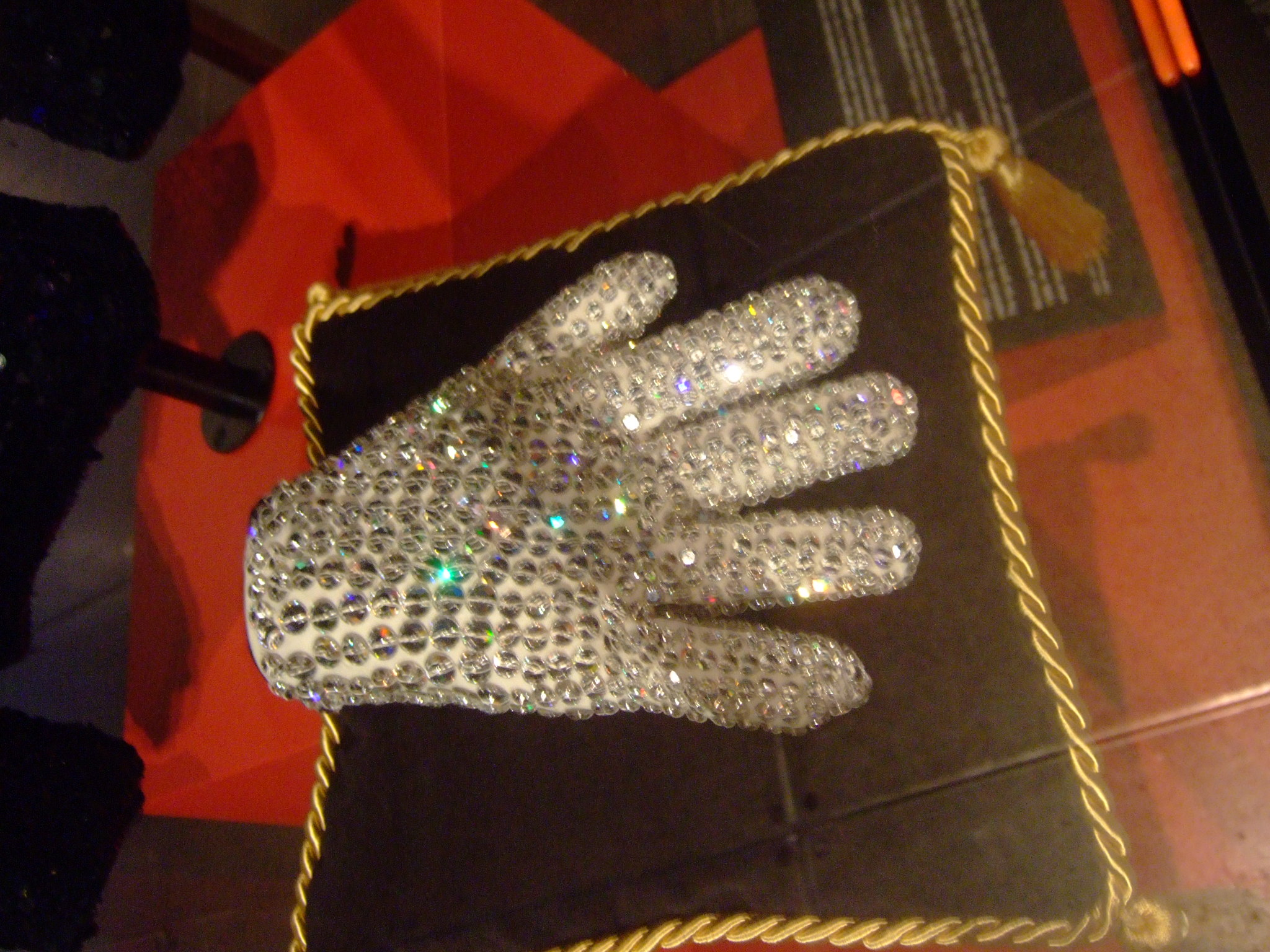
Jackson's rhinestone glove on display at the Museum of Pop Culture in Seattle, 2011

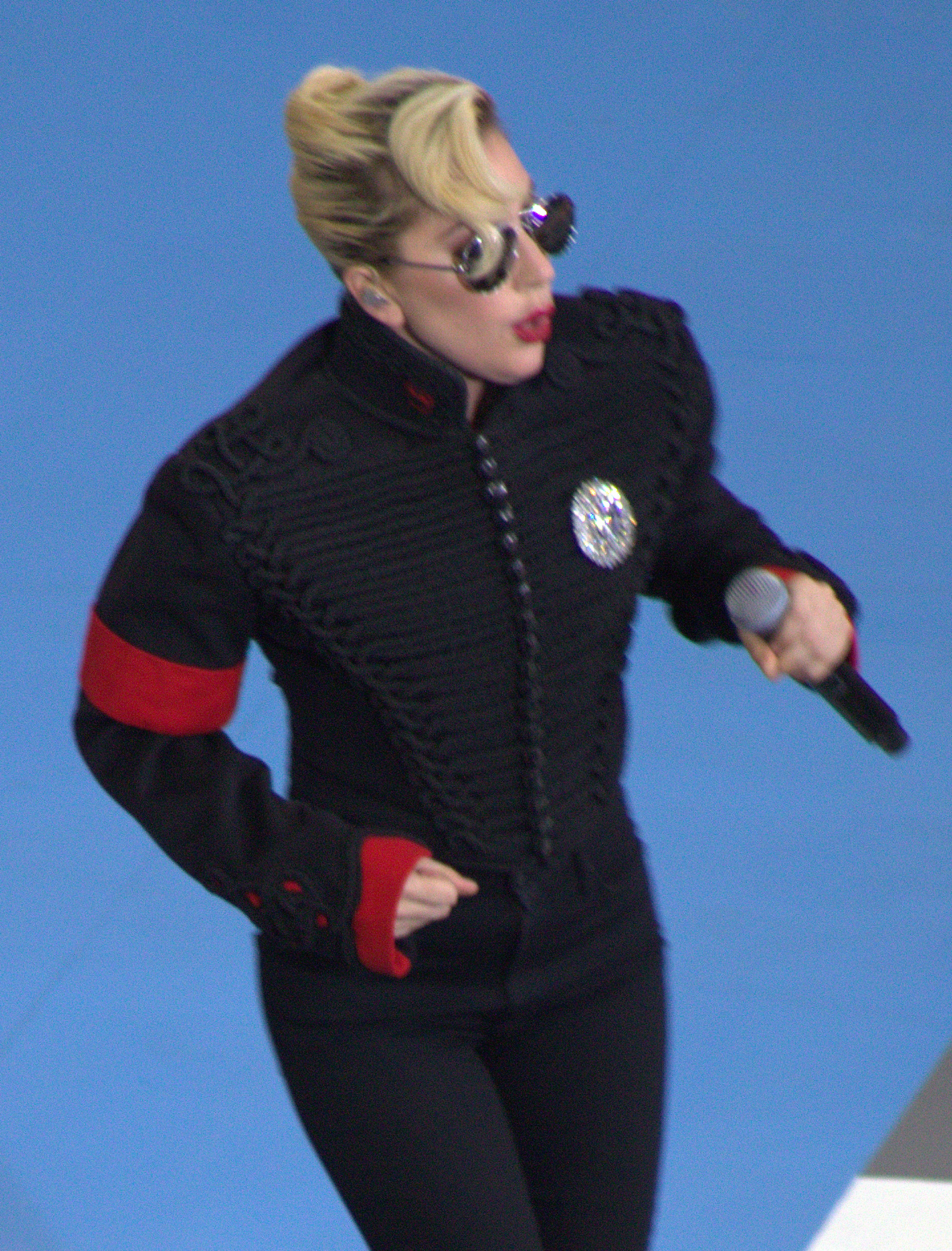
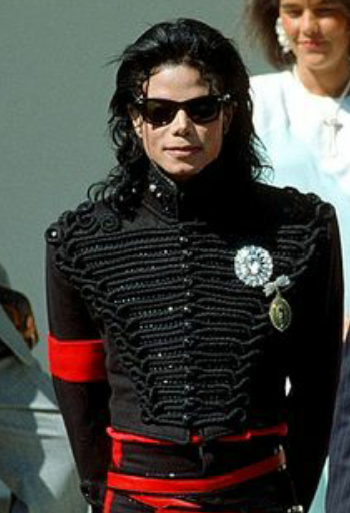
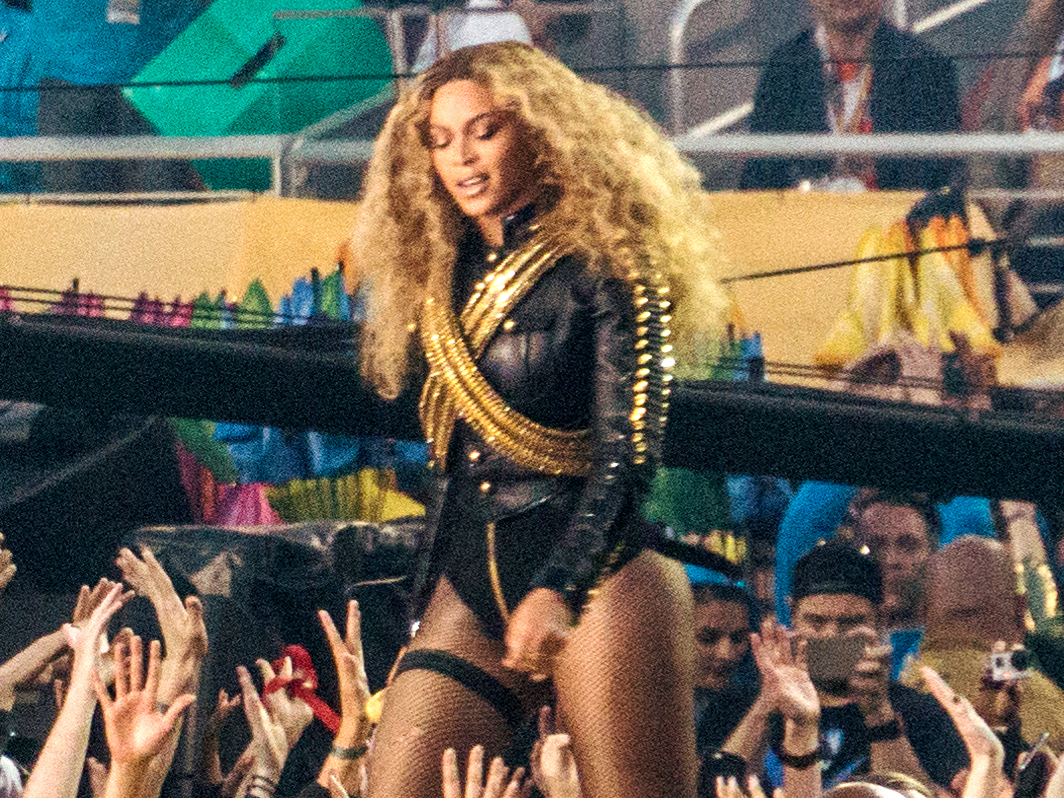
Lady Gaga (top left) wearing Jackson's (top right) jacket from his 1990 visit to the White House, at Hillary Clinton's final campaign rally during the 2016 U.S. presidential election. Beyoncé (bottom) wearing a Jackson-inspired outfit at Super Bowl 50 halftime show in 2016.

The Rolling Stone editors describe Jackson as "one of the most intriguing personas (sic) in popular music, at once childlike and obsessed with control" and comment on his ubiquitous presence, "spotlit in his trademark red zippered jacket and white sequined glove". Jackson often asked tailors to make him clothes that defied convention. His defiance led to a notable style that includes sequined gloves, a fedora, red leather jackets, sequined jackets, aviator sunglasses, black high-waisted pants, white socks, and leather penny loafers. Jackson was also interested in British and French royalty and military history from France, especially Napoleon, which resulted in his adoption of regalia and military jackets. His jackets often had a single-colored armband on one sleeve. At the height of his fame, Jackson inspired fashion trends around the world. British Vogue called him "a fashion pioneer [...] who gave new meaning to moonwalking, immortalised solitary, sparkly gloves, initiated the trophy jacket trend in the Eighties and was brave enough to couple dress with Madonna on the red carpet".

Others have been influenced by Jackson's fashion sense. In 2012, Lady Gaga named Jackson as an inspiration. She owns around 400 pieces from his personal collection. In 2016, she wore Jackson's jacket from his 1990 visit to the White House at Hillary Clinton's final campaign rally during the 2016 U.S. presidential election. Also in 2016, Beyoncé honored Michael Jackson at Super Bowl 50 by wearing a Jackson-inspired outfit, a black and gold military jacket similar to the one Jackson wore in his Super Bowl halftime show in 1993.

== Visual arts ==
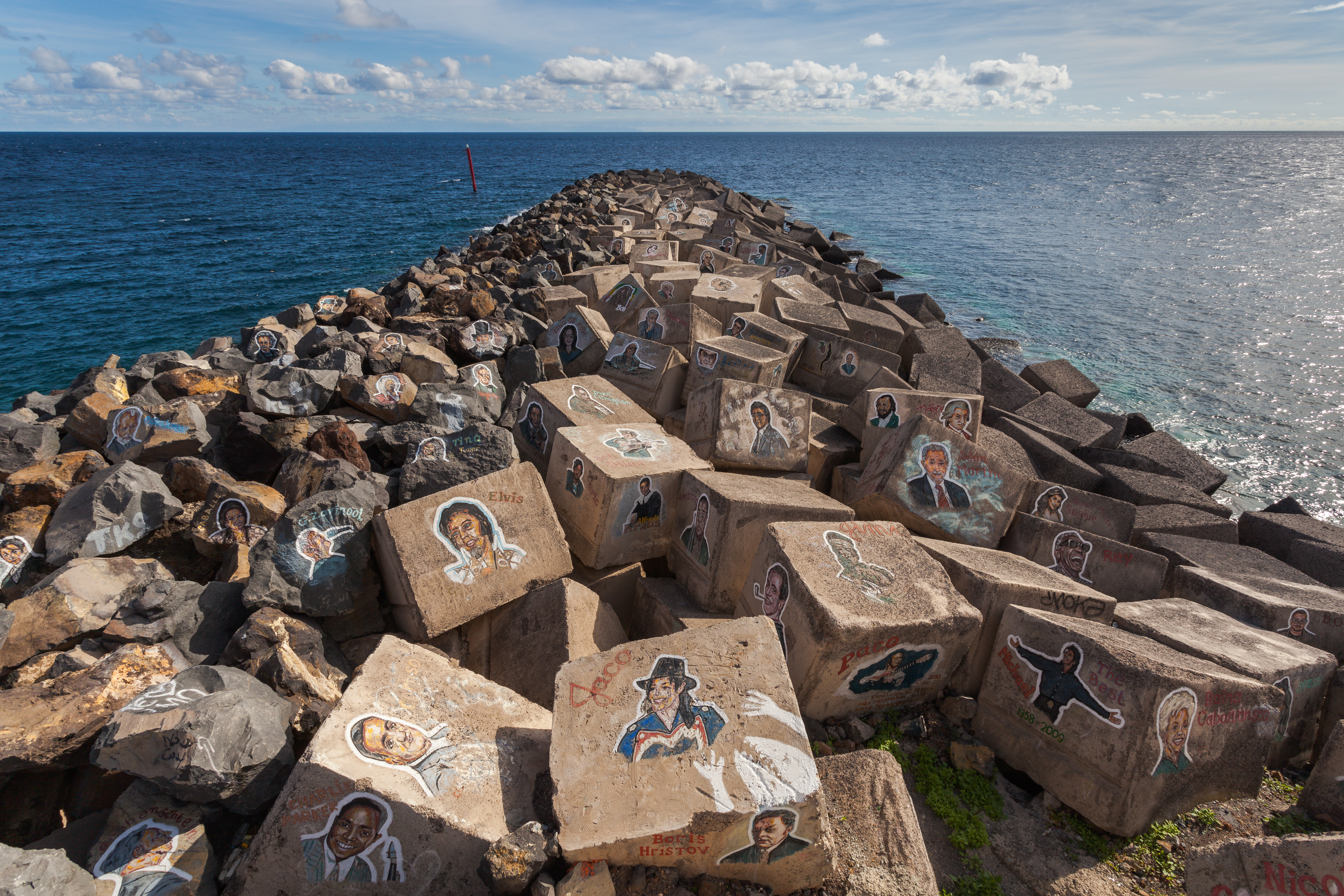
Michael Jackson (bottom-center) was part of the artwork "100 Faces of the Tenerife Auditorium".

Jackson has been depicted by a large number of contemporary artists, including Jeff Koons, Michael Craig-Martin and Grayson Perry. The silkscreen image of Jackson used on the cover of Time in 1984 was created by Andy Warhol. The final portrait Jackson commissioned before his death, by Kehinde Wiley, portrayed him as Philip II of Spain in the manner of a painting by Pieter Paul Rubens.

In June 2018, the National Portrait Gallery in London opened an exhibition titled Michael Jackson: On the Wall, featuring art inspired by Jackson and created by many leading artists. The curators stated that Jackson was "the most depicted cultural figure in visual art". The exhibition included the Warhol and Wiley pieces, and culminated in a 2005 film by Candice Breitz in which 16 young people are shown dancing to "Thriller". Guardian art critic Adrian Searle wrote that the singer's eccentricities and the common characterizations of him as "Ariel of the ghetto", a modern-day Baudelaire and Frankenstein's monster had provided artists with a wealth of imagery to explore in their work, and that as a muse he was "an inspiration, a model, a tragedy". Dick Zimmerman's portrait of Jackson used for Thriller is cited as "the world's largest distributed portrait in history". (Note: Michael Jackson: On the Wall was later displayed in Paris, Bonn and Espoo.)

=== Sculptures ===
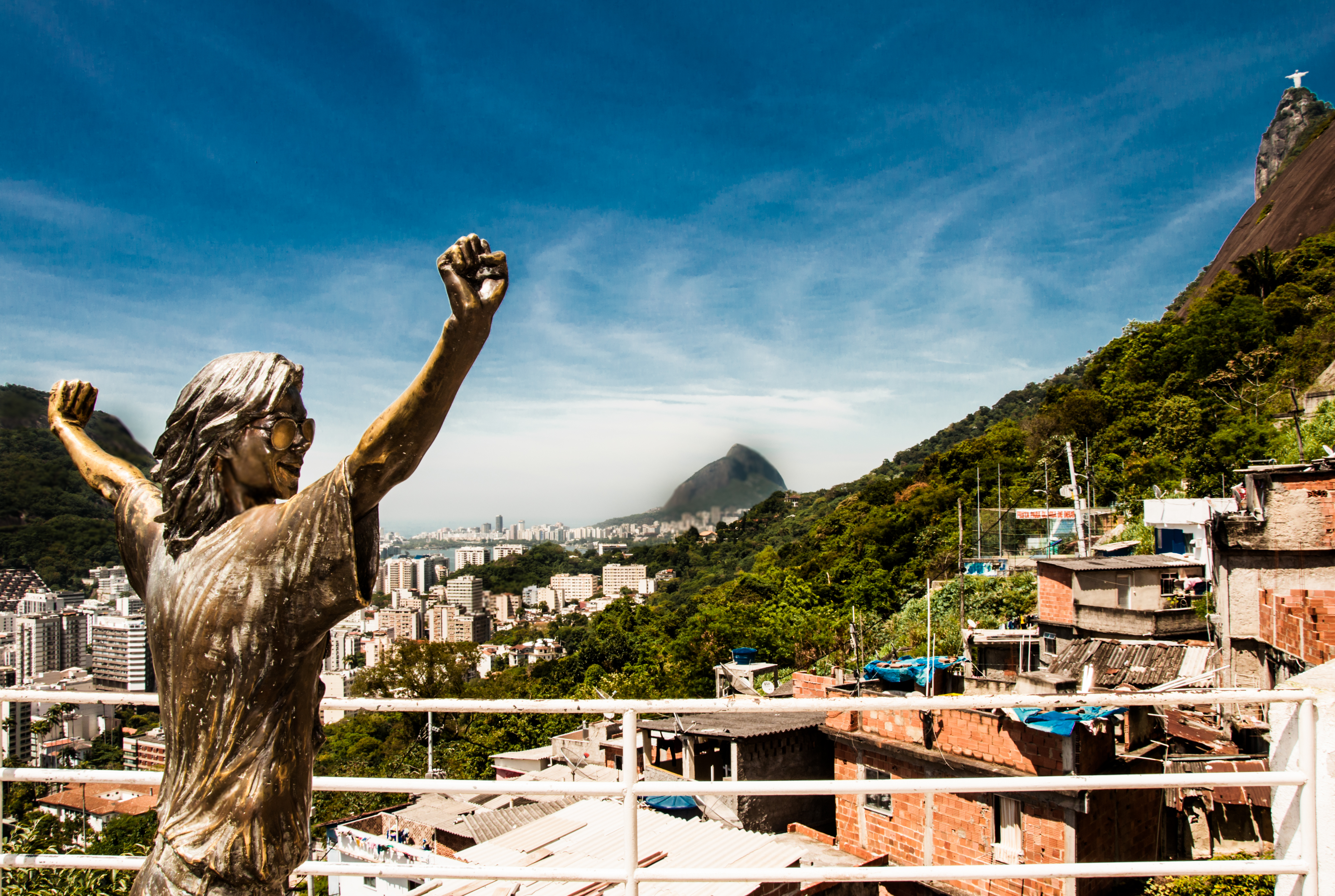
Statue of Michael Jackson in Favela Santa Marta, Rio de Janeiro, Brazil

Most of the statues and sculptures depicting Jackson are monuments dedicated to the music artist located across the world. Notable among them is the statue located in Favela Santa Marta, Rio de Janeiro, whose creation was announced the day after Jackson's death by the mayor of the city, with the intention of dedicating a memorial to the artist. Another significant example is the plaster and resin sculpture of Jackson that stood outside Craven Cottage in Fulham, London, the ground of Fulham Football Club, from 2011 until 2013, which was later moved to the National Football Museum in Manchester. Other countries and territories where statues dedicated to Jackson have been unveiled since his death include Hong Kong, Russia, Italy, Malaysia, India, China and Georgia. Currently, China has the most statues dedicated to Jackson. There are also some statues dating from before Jackson's death, such as the 10-foot sculpture of Jackson by Diana Walczak depicted on the cover of Jackson's album HIStory - PAST, PRESENT AND FUTURE - BOOK I, currently located in the lobby of the Mandalay Bay in Paradise, Nevada.

On the other hand, there are other sculptural artworks depicting Jackson that are not monuments, such as the porcelain sculpture Michael Jackson and Bubbles by the American artist Jeff Koons. It was created in 1988 within the framework of Koons's Banality series. Apart from the artist's proof, which is currently on display at The Broad in Los Angeles, three copies were made; one of them was sold at Sotheby's on 15 May 2001, when it was auctioned off to the record price of 5.6 million dollars, and the other two are in the Astrup Fearnley Museum of Modern Art in Oslo and the San Francisco Museum of Modern Art, respectively.

== Race politics ==
Early in his career, Jackson and his family were often portrayed in the press as having risen out of black ghetto culture. This stereotype reinforced their standing as role models for American youth but, as a fabrication by Motown's publicity department, it displeased the family. To many African-Americans, his youth and energy were a source of inspiration in the aftermath to Martin Luther King's 1968 assassination, at a time when the country's black-power and civil rights movements were in disarray. Jackson became a notable figure in the desegregation of US popular culture and music. Off the Wall succeeded at a time when disco was perceived as inferior to rock by critics. According to Vogel, one of the album's significant achievements was to integrate a diverse collection of talents from different races, cultures, and countries, and to coalesce them seamlessly into the record.

"Billie Jean" was one of the first music videos by a black artist to be shown on MTV, which hitherto had been a channel directed toward a white, rock-oriented audience. Although the song was already a number one hit on the Billboard charts, MTV initially refused to play the video because of the network's commitment to rock music. When CBS Records executive Walter Yetnikoff threatened to remove all of their products off MTV and expose its discriminatory policies, the network gave in. According to Edmondson, "The video [for 'Thriller'] is often cited as the musical phenomenon that completed the racial integration of popular music begun in the rock 'n' roll era."

The success of Thriller not only broke down racial barriers in music but also in other areas of contemporary society. Critic Greg Tate said, "Black people cherished Thriller's breakthrough as if it were their own battering ram [against] apartheid." Civil rights activist Al Sharpton commented, "Way before Tiger Woods or Barack Obama, Michael made black people go pop-culture global." He also attributed Obama's presidential win to "a process that Michael helped America graduate to" as crossover fans and imitators grew up to become voters. To some commentators in the 1980s, however, Jackson had betrayed his African-American roots, especially in his musical collaborations with former Beatle Paul McCartney—a point of criticism that Stanley says Jackson sought to address with his album Bad (1987).

The video for "Black or White" showed Jackson dancing with dancers of various ethnic groups and traditions, and the lyrics plead for racial tolerance and understanding. In early 1993, he launched a $1.25 million program to assist children affected by the 1992 Los Angeles riots and, in a TV interview conducted by Oprah Winfrey, discussed issues related to his African-American heritage and the abuse he suffered under his father. The viewer ratings for the show were among the highest in the history of US television. (Note: The broadcast followed Jackson's halftime concert performance at Super Bowl XXVII, in January, which Rolling Stone describes as "the most widely viewed entertainment event in [US] TV history" up to that time.)

In 1995, "They Don't Care About Us" was released as one of the singles from HIStory. In the mid-2010s, the track was used as an anthem for the Black Lives Matter movement. Originally recorded as part of the Dangerous sessions, the song was inspired by the Rodney King beating, which had led to the 1992 Los Angeles riots. The lyrics became more personal after Jackson felt dehumanized by the Santa Barbara County police's behavior during the investigation into the child sexual abuse accusations brought against him in 1993.

"They Don't Care About Us" attracted controversy over its supposedly antisemitic lyrics. Bernard Weinraub of The New York Times cited the lines "Jew me, sue me / Everybody do me / Kick me, kike me / Don't you black or white me" as "pointedly critical of Jews". Rabbi Abraham Cooper of the Simon Wiesenthal Center described the lyrics as "deeply disturbing" and potentially harmful to young people. Jackson issued statements saying that his lyrics were about "the pain of prejudice and hate" and that the song was "a way to draw attention to social and political problems". He described himself as "the voice of the accused and the attacked". The lyrics were eventually edited out with muffles.

== Global media ==
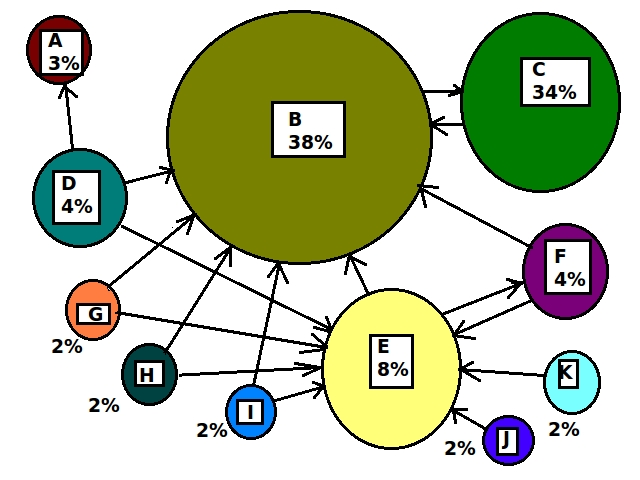
A PageRank diagram illustrating the process used to determine the most searched terms in the world

Michael Jackson's impact has been well-documented by global media outlets, statistical lists, and entertainment outlets' op-eds. Google Search using PageRank algorithm includes Michael Jackson among the 100 most Googled terms ever between 2003 to 2022, being one of a few persons to be included on the list along with technology and natural events. Branded titles including but not limited to "The King of Pop", "Biggest Pop Star" factor him as one of the most influential musical artists based on his sales, impact and acclaim. Particular descriptions by economic researchers and cultural journalists have also been detailed in various countries. Such titles, rankings, and achievements in both English and non-English languages include:

=== Historic rankings ===
Year/Era	Publication	Listed As	Ref.
Multiple	Forbes	"The World's Highest-Paid Male Solo Musician"	
Multiple	Forbes	"The World's Highest-Paid Dead Celebrity" (Note: Jackson received Forbes "world's highest paid solo male musician" a record 7 times, the most in his category. He also was Forbes "world's highest paid dead celebrity" a record 12 times, the most in said category.)	
2003–2022	Google Search/PR	"The 100 Most Googled Terms Ever"	
2016	Wikipedia	"The Most Viewed Wikipedia Page for a Musician"	
2014	Smithsonian	"The 100 Most Significant Americans of All Time"	
2013	National Institute of Health	The Most Influential People of All Time	
2014	Sydney Morning Herald	The Most Influential People of All Time	

=== English titles ===
List of published examples of English-language recognitions and titles granted to Michael Jackson
Year/Era	Publication	Listed As	Ref.
2024	Apple Music	"The Omnipresent global superstar"	
2009	ABC	"The Most Famous Person in the World"	
2019	Arab News	"The Most Recognizable Person in history"	
2010	The Atlantic	"The Most Influential Artist of the 20th Century"	
2009	BBC	"The Exciting Figure Who Defined Pop Music"	
2017	Bustle (magazine)	"The Most Famous Person in History"	
2014	BMI	"The Greatest Entertainer of All Time"	
2009	Bloomberg	"The Greatest Entertainer Who Ever Lived"	
2009	Billboard	"The King of Pop"	
2009	Billboard	"The Biggest Pop Star in History"	
2009	Billboard	"The Global Phenomenon"	
2014	CNN	"The World's Top Entertainer"	
2009	CNN	"The Biggest-Selling Recording Artist of All Time"	
2016	Complex	"The World's Greatest Pop Star"	
2018	E!	"The Pioneer in Every Sense of the World"	
2024	Esquire	"The Undisputed King of Pop"	
2024	Financial Express	"The World's First Megastar"	
2015	GQ	"The Everest of Entertainment"	
2021	The Guardian	"The Greatest Entertainer of His Generation"	
2006	Guinness World Records	"The Most Successful Entertainer of All Time"	
2006	Guinness World Records	"The Most Famous Person in the World"	
1997	Jet	"The Most Photographed Person in the World"	
2009	Los Angeles Times	"The Greatest Entertainer of All Time"	
2009	Harvard Business Review	"The World's Biggest Pop Star"	
2009	NBC	"The Most Famous Celebrity of All Time"	
2009	NBC	"The One Global Superstar"	
2009	The New York Times	"The Biggest Star in the World"	
2018	National Portrait Gallery	"The Most Depicted Figure of the 20th Century"	
2009	NPR	"The Pop Legend"	
2014	OK!	"The Most Influential Entertainer of the 20th Century"	
2023	People	"The Icon Beloved by the World"	
2003	Philippine Daily Inquirer	"The Best Selling Artist of All Time"	
2020	Pitchfork	"The Biggest Pop Star on the Planet"	
2014	Rhino	"The Biggest-Selling Artist of All Time"	
2014	Rhino	"The Most Awarded Entertainer of All Time"	
2014	Rhino	"The World's Most Famous Man"	
2014	Rhino	"The Most Popular Artist in History"	
2002	Rolling Stone	"The Biggest Star in the World"	
2010	Rolling Stone	"The World's Greatest Entertainer"	
2014	Rolling Stone	"The Greatest Pop Artist That Ever Lived"	
2016	Smithsonian	"The Throne in Pop Royalty History"	
2012	Time	"The Consummate Performer"	
2009	Time	"The Supernova"	
2009	Time	"The Vanishing-Point Talent"	
2009	Time	"The Far Right of the Bell Curve"	
1984	Variety	"The Best Selling Artist of All Time"	
2009	Vanity Fair	"The Pop King"	
2009	Vanity Fair	"The Boy Who Would Be King"	
2024	Vibe	"The Greatest Performer of All Time"	
2017	VH1	"The One and Only King of Pop"	
2021	Vogue	"The Late, Great, King of Pop"	
2009	Wall Street Journal	"The Most Gifted Pop Entertainer of His Era"	
2016	Wired	"The Biggest Pop Star in the World"	
2000	World Music Awards	"The Artist of the Millennium"	
2024	Yahoo	"The Greatest Artist of All Time"	

=== Non-English titles ===
List of published examples of non-English language recognitions and titles granted to Michael Jackson
Year/Era	Publication	Listed As / (Translation)	Ref.
2019	The Asahi Shimbun (Japan)	キング・オブ・ポップの名にふさわしい/ ("Worthy of The Name of King of Pop")	
2024	Folha (Brazil)	A maior estrela pop de todos os tempos/ ("The Biggest Pop Star of All Time")	
2025	Vogue China (China)	他不仅是流行音乐史上最伟大的象征，同时也是时尚界不朽的明星。 (the greatest symbol in the history of pop music)	
2011	CCTV (China)	他是偶像中的偶像，天王中的天王，20世纪最伟大的艺人，没有之一。这位流行音乐之王，两次入选摇滚名人堂 (He is the idol of idols, the king of kings, and the greatest artist of the 20th century)	
2010	Der Spiegel (Germany)	Ein Wunderknabe, der zum König des Pop wird/ ("A Boy Wonder Who Becomes the King of Pop")	
2009	Le Monde (France)	Le chanteur le plus connu au monde/ ("The Most Famous Singer in the World")	
2019	Corriere della Sera (Italy)	Una progressiva scalata di vette mai neppure concepite dalla storia della musica leggera/ ("A progressive climb to heights never even conceived in the history of pop music")	
2009	La Jornada (Mexico)	Pionero al comunicar un lenguaje que todos entendieron/ ("The Pioneer in Communicating A Language Everyone Understood")	
2009	Guangming (China)	歌壇天王/ ("The King of Music")	
2013	The Dong-A Ilbo (South Korea)	'대체 불가능 아티스트' 영원한 팝의 황제 / 미국 팝 역사상 가장 큰 영향력을 발휘했던/ ("The Irreplaceable Artist, Eternal King of Pop / The Most Influential in American Pop History")	
2016	Het Laatste Nieuws (Belgium)	Zijn muzikaliteit en dansmoves veranderden de muziekgeschiedenis voor altijd/ ("His musicianship and dance moves changed music history forever")	
2021	Amar Ujala (India)	दुनिया में बहुत सारे पॉप स्टार हुए हैं और आज भी हैं, लेकिन माइकल जैक्सन जैसा कोई नहीं है।/ ("There have been and still are many pop stars in the world, but there is no one like Michael Jackson")	
2018	Gazeta Wyborcza (Poland)	Najpopularniejszy piosenkarz poprockowy świata/ ("Most popular pop-rock singer in the world")	
2021	Thairath (Thailand)	เป็นศิลปินขวัญใจคนทั่วโลก สำหรับ/ ("An artist loved by people all over the world")	
2009	El Mundo (Spain)	Antes de Michael Jackson, la música era blanca o negra. Con él, se vuelve incolora/ ("Before Michael Jackson, music was black or white. With him, it became colorless")	

== Impact by country ==
Regarded as one of the most famous figures in modern history, Jackson had a major impact, both culturally and politically in various countries. Ben Beaumont-Thomas, music editor for The Guardian, said Jackson "ushered in a global culture" and that his impact extended into "areas previously untouched by Western pop culture". In an ethnographic portrait collection on the subculture of his tribute fans, writer Lorena Turner states his "ability to transcend race, gender and a wide range of cultural stigmas". His moniker "King of Pop" is accepted and used in media by other countries. Particularly during tours, Jackson additionally held a foreign affairs role, holding meetings with prime ministers, royalty and presidents as well as part of his concert proceeds funneling to orphanages of the country visited. The Sydney Morning Herald's political editor Peter Hartcher compared his 2009 death a "remarkable moment of worldwide political and popular unity is a reminder of the immensity of American soft power". Over the years, journalists have detailed his unifying ability as a cultural figure:

The reason Michael mattered — continues to matter — is because he was one of the first truly international stars. Not just transatlantic, not just big in Japan: He was global. The obvious effect was economic. Michael opened markets around the world. It is Michael Jackson selling records — but it is also a stall in Malaysia selling bootlegged Michael Jackson tapes and T-shirts [...] It is a flea market in South Africa where they sell framed illustrations of Michael Jackson and Jesus. [...] Last night, impersonators massed in Mexico City. In London, plans for a mob moonwalk this evening. In my neighborhood in New York, Michael wafts out of every car, from every window. In Taiwan, an inordinate number of kids are named "Michael" or "Jackson." Packets of information, traveling the globe.

— Pulitzer Prize-winning Cultural writer Hua Hsu, Michael Jackson: He Was The World

Furthermore, the United States House Committee on Foreign Affairs during the 111th Congress was proposed a resolution to honor Michael Jackson's global humanitarian contributions. The resolution detailed over 40 spearhead efforts of Jackson in the country and abroad which include cancer research, terminally-ill funding, education, immunization grants, anti-racism campaigns and global hunger charities.

=== Europe ===
==== Czechia ====
To celebrate Jackson's HIStory World Tour, a large statue of the singer was erected in Letná Park, the place once occupied by Joseph Stalin. Jackson's airport arrival in Prague, Czech Republic was described by a merchant civilian as equivalent to "Yuri Gagarin returning home after landing on the Moon". Other people climbed on trees and upon the roofs of buildings in effort to get a glimpse of Jackson, whose security force and associates caused multiple traffic jams and took up 5 floors of the InterContinental hotel with a crowd of over 5,000 people blocking the streets waiting to see Jackson from his Hotel suite. Jackson's concert at Prague is one of the largest in history with an estimated 125,000 in attendance and thousands more outside the fences. Before his performance, Jackson was welcomed to Prague Castle for a meeting with President Václav Havel, and toured the capital city as well as children's home in Zbraslav and the traumatology centre in Prague's Motol University Hospital. After his concert, the statue was moved to Eindhoven.

==== Germany ====
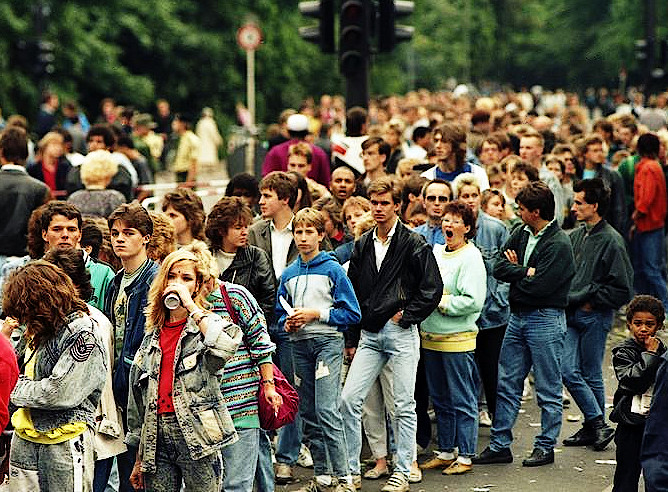
German fans lining up for the Bad tour in 1988

During the last four years of the Cold War, Jackson's popularity in Germany was notable, as his 1988 Bad tour visit to Berlin was met with immense protocol. As the city was physically divided, fans attempted to watch or hear the June 19 concert over the wall, either from behind the Brandenburg Gate area or the nearby Charite hospital. An infamous Stasi file was kept of Jackson, detailing the secret police deemed the visit a possible perceived threat, as an outlet described the police had fear of his potential to inspire and mobilize. Fearing the concert could cause rebellion if Jackson were to make any politically sensitive comments, they methodized censorship. A look-alike during his SAT 1 conference was hired, and a two-minute broadcast delay would be put in place in which they could transfer to a pre-recording. At one point, Jackson famously pointed towards the Wall and declared, "This is for all the fans over there in East Berlin!" to which a PMA journalist expressed, "In the end, Jackson's Berlin Wall concert stands as a testament to the transformative power of art and the enduring human spirit. It's a vivid reminder that even in the darkest of times, a song can light up the night, and a performance can inspire change." German newspaper Der Spiegel called Jackson "Deutschland's King of Pop" for his unique impact on the country's culture.

==== Poland ====
In front of a crowd of over 120,000 people, Michael Jackson performed his concert at the Bemowo airport, which makes it one of the largest concerts of all time and, to date, the biggest concert in Poland's history. Jackson arrived in Poland on September 18, 1996 at Okęcie International Airport and a mini ceremony welcomed by children dressed in traditional Polish attire presented him with bouquets of flowers. As he traveled to his hotel, a police motorcade escorted him, and thousands of fans lined the streets, cheering and waving with excitement. In return, Jackson frequently interacted with them and engaging in playful conversations. Before the concert, Jackson was welcomed to the Presidential Palace where he had a scheduled meeting with then President Aleksander Kwasniewski who welcomed him with his wife Jolanta Kwaśniewska. After a meeting with Warsaw mayor Marcin Święcicki, he visited an orphanage on No. 4 Rakowiecka Street in the north of Mokotów to where chorus children gathered to sing Heal the World. Jackson had a positive experience in Poland, stating he considered to "buy a castle in the beautiful country". By 1997 he met with business partners with plans to open an amusement park; learning at the time there were no major theme parks in the Warsaw area. Kwasniewski released a statement on Jackson, "He was a king, an extraordinary talent but at the same time a very sensitive person". His theme park plan was still in talks years later, though had never came to fruition after the years-long proposal.

==== Romania ====
Upon arrival in Romania in 1992 during the Dangerous World Tour, Jackson was greeted by thousands of fans in what was described at the time as "the biggest-ever performance by a Western pop star in the country that until 1989 had been isolated by Ceausescu's Stalinist regime". Likened to that of a head of state official visit, he meet with then President Ion Iliescu at the Royal Palace and proceeded to stop by orphanages prior to his concert in front of 70,000 people at Bucharest. The Seattle Times confirmed that all concert proceeds were to benefit 100,000 orphans housed in squalid state-run institutions. Over 22,000 security officers were assigned to protect Jackson during the proceedings. Mass hysteria exploded after the concert, as approximately a thousand young fans of Jackson protested that Jackson deserved "the Nobel Peace Prize because he did more to help children than any politician". Newspaper România liberă controversially claimed President Iliescu staged his meeting with Jackson during a financial crisis to help him get re-elected, which his foreign minister Adrian Năstase denied. A special live broadcast special of the event was released years later Live in Bucharest: The Dangerous Tour garnering the highest ratings for HBO in the history of the channel up until that point. Years later, a continuous cultural figure in their country, Romanian fans erected a statue for him in Bucharest after his death.

==== United Kingdom ====
In United Kingdom history, Thriller and Bad are the two highest-selling albums by a male solo artist. Only Jackson and rock band Queen have multiple entries in the top ten. His Bad tour once held London's Wembley Stadium record of 504,000 attendees over seven nights until Taylor Swift was reported to beat the record 36 years later for her eight nights at Wembley for The Eras tour. Reports stated Wembley's ticket demand for Jackson's dates exceeded 1.5 million, enough to fill the 72,000-capacity venue 20 times, though the number of nights were strictly kept as the venue reached their quota length for security maintenance. To date, Jackson holds the record for most sold out events at Wembley with 15 sold out concerts over his career. Comparably in Liverpool at Aintree Racecourse, reported amongst most-attended concerts in history with 125,000 fans, of which 1,550 fans were reported having minor injuries due to uncontrollable crowd, with an estimated 31 to 40 people requiring hospitalization. This was despite Merseyside Police drafting in 500 extra officers and a first aid team for the event, though no deaths were reported. His 2009 This Is It concert residency was to be held exclusively at The O2 Arena in London sold out of 750,000 tickets within 4 hours, to which organizers described to be "a cultural phenomenon".

=== Africa ===
Jackson first visited Africa in 1974 with the Jackson 5, a visit that inspired his Bad single "Liberian Girl". Along with Jackson compositions such as "Heal the World" and "We Are the World", fans from Liberia found the song uplifting and his message resonated there in a climate of civil war and human atrocities. By 1992, Jackson carried out a multi-nation African cultural tour to Tunisia, Gabon, Ivory Coast, Senegal, Tanzania, Egypt and South Africa, intent on visiting "orphanages, children's hospitals, churches, schools and playgrounds". Jackson's trip was a huge success as his visit drew more spectators in Gabon than Nelson Mandela and more in the Ivory Coast than the Pope, "From his sunset arrival in Gabon, where more than 100,000 people greeted him with spiritual bedlam". While in Ivory Coast, he was crowned king of the Agni people in the Kingdom of Sanwi. Later that year, he established the Heal the World Foundation to raise awareness of social issues related to children.

Until 1994, with the fall of apartheid in South Africa, Jackson was the only artist whose songs were played on white pop stations and black R&B stations there. According to Metro FM presenter Lupi Ngcayisa, his lyrics "forced black families to debate issues surrounding individualism and race". South African R&B artist Loyiso Bala, of the Bala Brothers, likened Jackson's impact to Mandela and said that as a black boy growing up in a township, "you either wanted to be Michael Jackson or a freedom fighter". NPR's Africa correspondent, Ofeibea Quist-Arcton said:

Africans all across the continent are mourning the loss. [...] A Kenyan woman, with a tremor in her voice, asked how a legend dared die, because they were not supposed to die. [...] Across the continent in West Africa, a Nigerian radio host reportedly broke down live on air. [...] But, mostly, Africans are mourning the man whose dazzling dance steps and musical genius are likely to be Jackson's lasting legacy.

Michael is said to remain a consistently popular figure in Africa with stories of his fame spread across the continent. In 2016, John Mahama, then President of Ghana, referred to "Heal the World" in a speech at the United Nations General Assembly to encourage globalization and acceptance of refugees, and to denounce xenophobia.

=== South America ===
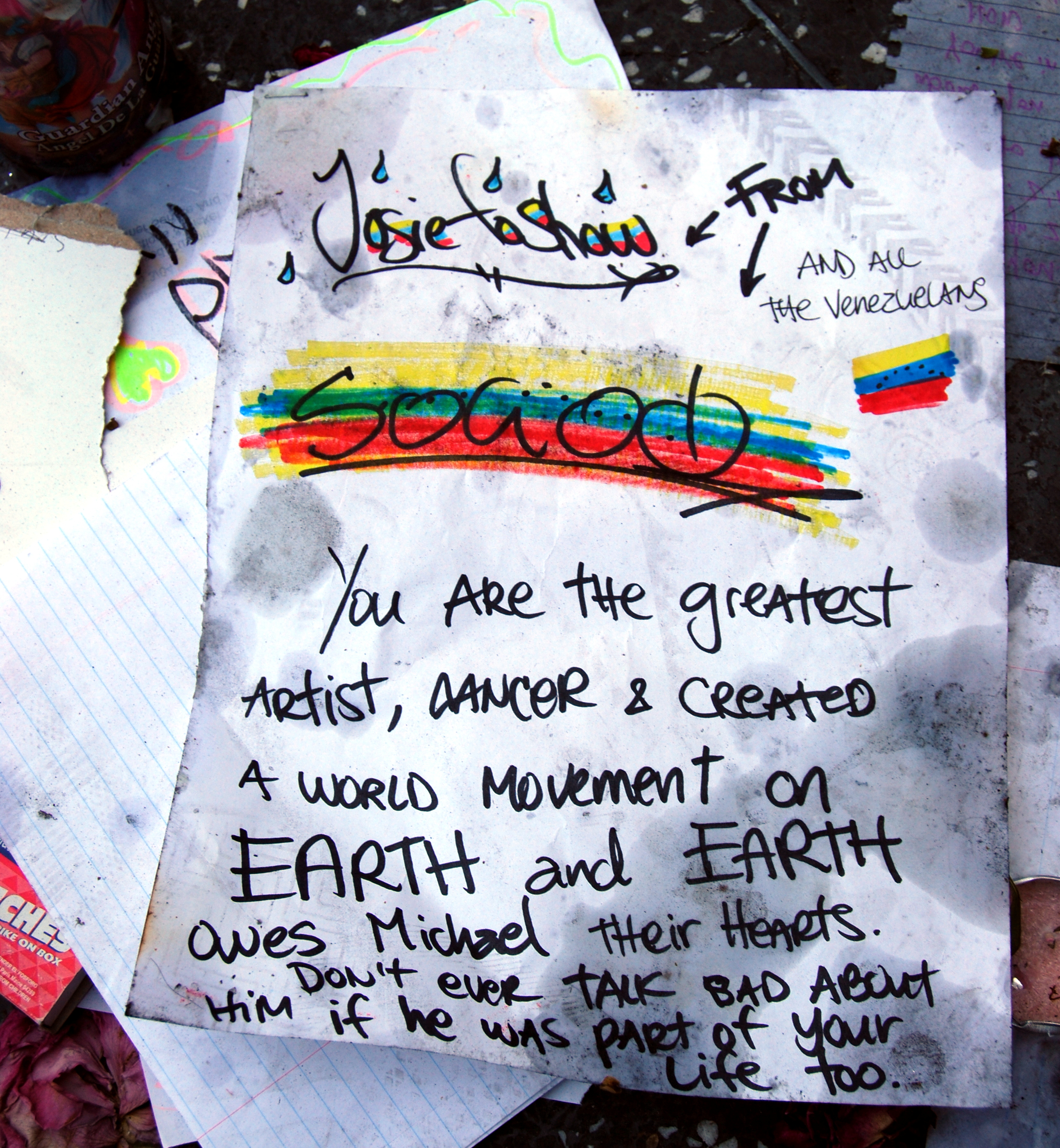
Note to Jackson from a Venezuelan fan

Before the existence of Brazilian music certification in 1990, Jackson is among Brazil's best selling albums by international artists with only Jackson and singer Julio Iglesias holding claimed sales over 2 million. In 1996, Jackson visited Santa Marta in Rio de Janeiro, Brazil to film with director Spike Lee one of the videos for "They Don't Care About Us". It was intended to bringing global attention to the social issues faced by residents of these impoverished communities. Initially, Rio's local government was concerned that Jackson would show the world an unflattering picture of poverty, which might affect tourism, and accused Jackson of exploiting the poor. Others supported Jackson's wish to bring public awareness to problems of the region, arguing that the government was embarrassed by its own failings. A judge banned all filming but this ruling was overturned by an injunction. Jackson performed with the Olodum, which runs an inner-city school for Salvador's underprivileged children centered to build self-esteem and encourage economic ascension. Speaking of the music video in The New Brazilian Cinema, Lúcia Nagib commented:

He used the favela people as extras in a visual super-spectacle [...]. The interesting aspect of Michael Jackson's strategy is the efficiency with which it gives visibility to poverty and social problems in countries like Brazil without resorting to traditional political discourse. The problematic aspect is that it does not entail a real intervention in that poverty.

In 2009, Billboard described the area as "now a model for social development" and claimed that Jackson's influence was partially responsible for this improvement. Because of his immense popularity, he has received both governmental and fan tributes in Spanish-speaking countries such as Chile, who gave him virtual presidential honors on his 1993 visit to the country Argentina, and Peru. For Spanish fans, he then released the single Todo mi amor eres tú' (You are all my love)." In 2015, a Latin project was released for Michael Jackson, Unity: The Latin Tribute to Michael Jackson.

=== Asia ===
==== China ====
According to the list of best-selling physical albums in China, Jackson is the best-selling English musician after The Lion King and Titanic soundtracks in China. MinnPost cited his appeal largely comes from his association with China's Open Door Policy and the reform and opening up, which kicked into gear in the 1980s, after American established diplomatic relations with China the previous year (1979 hegemony versus previously state-controlled radio). Due to his popularity, China currently is the country with the largest number of statues dedicated to Jackson, with 10 statues in cities such as Guangzhou, Chengdu, Nanning, Xi'an, Zhengzhou and Wuhan. He has been referenced or had songs used in many Chinese-language films such as Detective Chinatown 3, Gong Shou Dao, Art College 1994, Old Boys, Police Story, City Hunter and Shaolin Soccer. According to Adam Tsuei, President of Sony Music Entertainment Greater China division, Jackson's sales in Asia have continued to be strong despite rampant piracy. Until today, there are various impersonators scattered across China.

==== India ====
Rock may have smashed the iron curtain, but it was just the moonwalk that did it for India [...] Michael Jackson was not just a pop star for us; he represented the world beyond India we had only heard about as well as the possibility of catching up with it. Michael Jackson was the first symbol of aspiration for a generation that went from denial to obsession about it almost overnight. In the 1980s, bootleg VHS copies of Thriller went from home to home, even as we sought to work hard and study and buy into the first signs of consumerism that had started to appear. By the 1990s, with economic liberalization and the rise of satellite television channels like MTV India and Channel V, Michael Jackson, his music, image, and charisma all became a part of India, like globalization itself.

— Vamsee Juluri, Professor at University of San Francisco, The Dawn of Global India, Huffington Post

By 1983, Jackson became the representative global music star of India. Culture journalists such as Vamsee Juluri, and Kamla Bhatt have agreed he was a "huge influence on Bollywood and Indian film industry." Billboard noted,

For many people in India — a market where international repertoire accounts for just 5% of physical music sales — Michael Jackson is Western pop. Alone among Western artists, his popularity isn't confined to English-speaking urban Indians. Among the country's rural youth his celebrity competes with Bollywood stars for one reason: his trademark dance moves.

A country drawing influence from Jackson, several movies have been inspired directly by him or have him as a central theme such as Munna Michael, ABCD: Any Body Can Dance and Donga.

India's entertainment tax was waived by the ruling Shiv Sena just for Jackson to perform in the country. Jackson visited India in 1996 during his History World Tour, where he was greeted by thousands of fans; the media noted that his security force was larger than that of the Prime Minister. A journalist told Condé Nast Traveler, "These were the days when noise control norms were still lax, and one could hear his music for miles. People were going nuts - they were singing and dancing in the streets." His show in Mumbai was performed in front of a sold out audience of 70,000 in an effort to raise funds to provide jobs for young people in the state of Maharashtra. Upon his arrival, an unprecedented frenzy as 15 km of Bombay's streets were filled with fans hoping to catch a glimpse of Michael Jackson who was escorted to his hotel by a 30-car police motorcade. BBC reported this brew tensions and separations within the Shiv Sena party, as oppositions asked how a Hindu right-wing party could back a pop concert which "represented Western values". Suketu Mehta summed it up, "And well, what is culture? He represents certain values in America which India should not have any qualms in accepting. We should like to accept that part of America that is represented by Jackson." Sony Music Entertainment India stated that millions of Jackson's records had been distributed in the country with Jackson accounting for 26% of all music downloads in India following his death. British-born hip-hop star Hard Kaur explained, "Actors, established choreographers, aspiring composers, kids in dance shows [...] Go to any village, any corner in India and you'll find everyone is familiar with the name Michael Jackson." Top Bollywood actor Shah Rukh Khan stated that he was a huge fan of Jackson with Khan later brought Bollywood together two months later in order to pay tribute to Michael Jackson which was televised to Indian audiences.

In 2011, the Bombay High Court opened a case against the 1996 tax waive, which named Raj Thackeray, President of Maharashtra Navnirman Sena (MNS), Wizcraft International and Shiv Sena's employment wing, Shiv Udyog Sena as brainchilds for the event. For ten years, it was transferred to multiple courts including the Supreme Court of India, until 2021 when the Cabinet granted its approval.

==== Japan ====
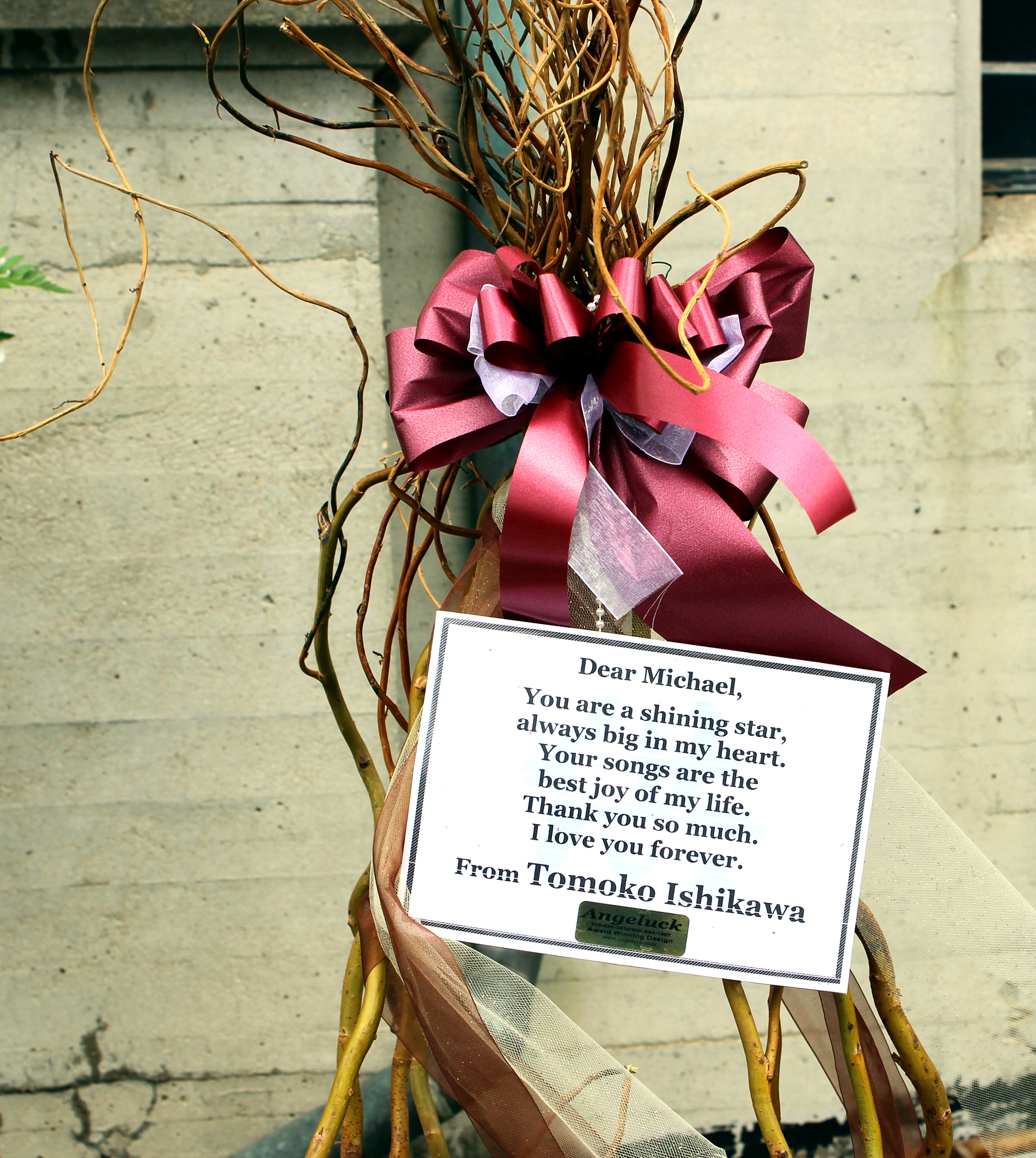
Japanese fan leaves a wreath at his memorial site with the message, "Your songs are the best joy of my life"

Indicative of Japan's devotion to Jackson was the hysteria that his visits caused. Japan's music market is second in the world with Jackson being the country's highest certified Western male soloist, even though the majority of the country's sales are not traceable before Japan's music certification RIAJ established in 1989. Defense Minister Yasukazu Hamada has credited him with building a generation with his music. Because of his immense popularity starting in the 1970s, he had several advertising deals with Suzuki's Love Scooter. For the initial leg of his first solo tour 1987's Bad, he told the Associated Press he chose Japan as his first leg of his tour, "I love Japan [...] It is one of my favorite places in the entire world." Editor Sam Jameson of LA Times released sale measurements, "No singer, foreign or Japanese, has matched that record (at that point). Nearly 400,000 tickets were sold in advance." The 9-show tour expanded to 14 performances in Tokyo, Osaka and Yokohama. His infamous note left at Capitol Hotel Tokyu was reprinted on People magazine's October 1987 release showed his handwriting, "I love every race on planet earth". MTV Video Music Awards Japan anointed him their Legend Award. While visiting for the awards ceremony, he held a Japanese banquet and invited 100 orphans and handicapped children for free.

His passing had a major cultural effect on Japan, with multi-day coverage of various television tributes and news updates. Health Minister Yōichi Masuzoe added, "He was a superstar. It is an extremely tragic loss. But it is fantastic he was able to give so many dreams and so much hope to the people of the world." A part of Japanese culture is doppelganger industry, related to impersonators, with Jackson being a popular choice to emulate.

==== Pakistan ====
Following his 2009 death, many local television channels in Pakistan shifted their focus to cover the news, temporarily setting aside the ongoing military campaign against Taliban militants. This change in programming highlights the global impact of Jackson whom at the time was regarded "internationally acclaimed" by Pakistan People's Party (PPP) Salim Qureshi Khokhar who asked the House to observe a minute of silence "as he was an Islam". Minister for Local Government Shazia Marri interjected the claims, "Jackson's brother may have been a Muslim but there's no confirmation about Jackson having converted to Islam". Professor of International Relations at Boston University Adil Najam recalled Jackson's cultural relevance in the country, which inspired vast television and music in Pakistan, "There was a time when - irrespective of your economic and social class - the way to be 'tich' was to be like Michael Jackson [...] And no stage show from Peshawar to Karachi would ever be complete without the 'performance' of a Michael Jackson clone."

==== South Korea ====
Founders of the first largest K-pop record companies Lee Soo-man (SM Entertainment) and Park Jin-young (JYP Entertainment) have named Michael Jackson's influence in their venture into music, with Park stating his journey in music began particularly when he first heard Jackson's Off the Wall album and Lee's business desire began seeing the "meteoric rise" of Jackson while studying in the states. Jackson has been honored in several shows, thematically reference in songs, and cited as a major influence to the biggest K-pop solo acts in the country such as BoA, Rain, Jay Park, Hyuna, Chung Ha, Yunho, Kim Junsu, Taemin, as well as several idol members from Exo, BTS, Super Junior, NCT, Seventeen, among others. In Seoul, fashion wholesaler Shin Ji-hyun said Jackson was the most popular foreign superstar in the country. Additionally, choreographers such as Lia Kim, Rino Nakasone and Rie Hata have cited him as their main influence.

In late 1996, Jackson performed two nights at Seoul Olympic Stadium to an audience of 100,000. He had spoken positively of the culture in Korea, and had taken a particular liking to Bibimbap. The following year, he began a friendship with President-elect Kim Dae-jung. Jackson, who rarely gets involved with politics, took part in an international video conference supporting Kim's candidacy for the 1997 South Korean presidential election, stating "Korea is a country of warmth, love, sincerity and complete innocence." He attended Kim's inaugural ceremony. Around the same time, Jackson had met a Korean adviser named Myung Ho Lee. Lee would eventually emerged as a central figure in the performer's debt binge. Another former financial adviser Alvin Malnik estimates that some of Jackson's advisers squandered $50 million to $100 million on deals that never panned out. It was eventually settled out of court. In 1999, he held MJ & Friends in Seoul. In the year of his death, tributes formed on television and memorials, with Kim Dae-jung releasing a statement, "Today, we lost a hero and a dear friend of Korea who supported our country's cause for reunification and peace."

=== North America ===
==== Mexico ====
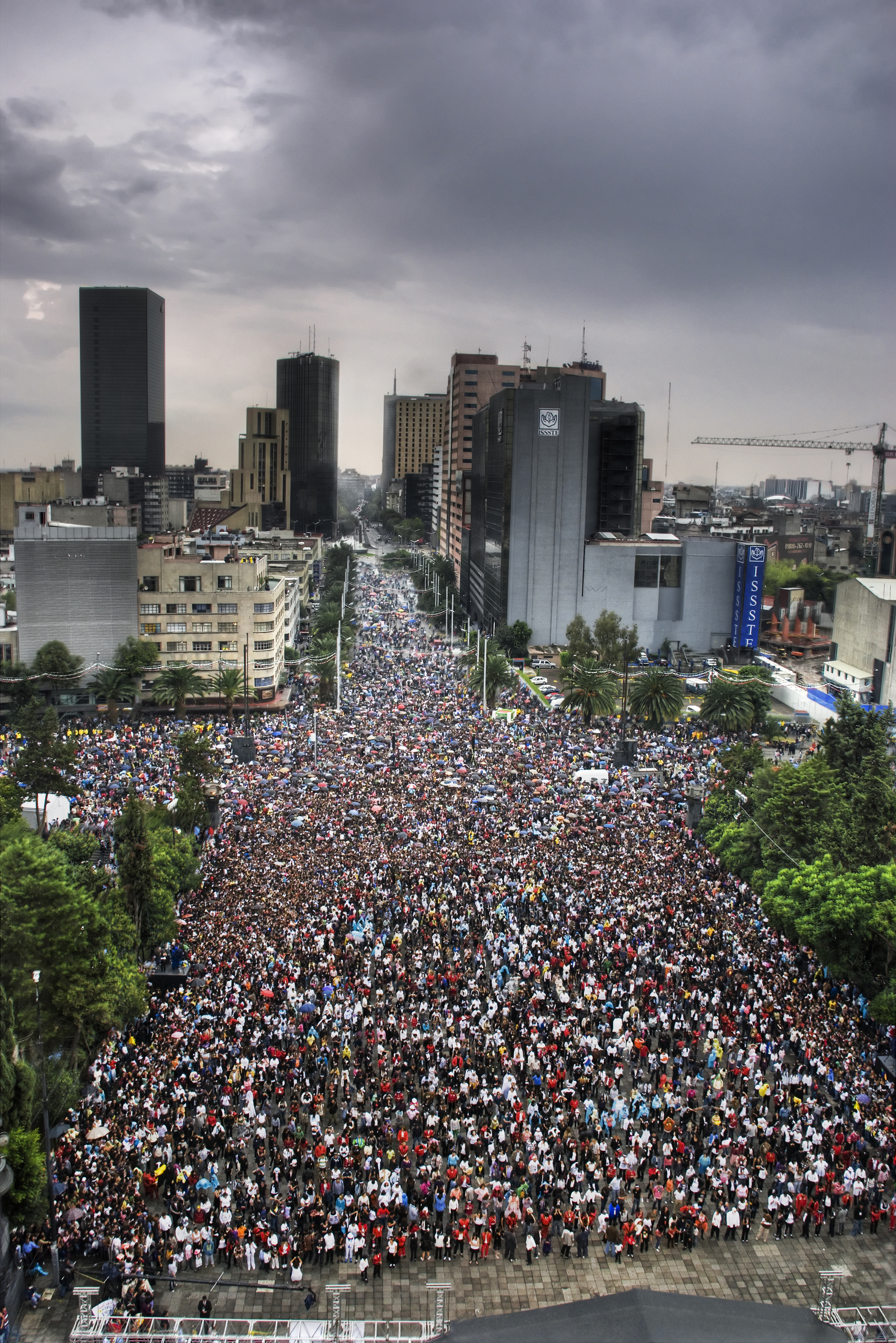
13,000 people dancing to Thriller in Mexico City

Jackson's Thriller holds the all-time record for best-selling album in Mexico, based on Asociación Mexicana de Productores de Fonogramas y Videogramas. During his 1993 Dangerous World Tour, he gave five concerts at the largest stadium in Latin America, Estadio Azteca in Mexico for 550,000 people, breaking an attendance record for greatest number of fans across a run of shows at the stadium. Through his concert run, he met with former president, Carlos Salinas de Gortari. There is an active fan community in Mexico. On his birth date following his death, 13,000 fans gathered at the Monumento a la Revolución for a Thriller flash mob, which at one point held a Guinness World Record. Mexico's Tourism Secretary Alejandro Rojas released a statement, "We are very happy because the initiative came from the people."

=== Middle East ===
==== Saudi Arabia ====
Even inside the most conservative families' households. There was just something about him and his songs that rang true. When we were teenagers, we would often smuggle music by MJ into our school in Saudi Arabia and share it among us by putting the cassettes into generic plastic covers to hide the fact that we were listening to his music. There were fears among the religious police about his "influence" on the young mind, particularly as songs such as Bad and Beat It were copied and sung, and even dubbed into Arabic, by the young and the rebellious. We didn't care about his personal life, it didn't matter. What was important were the songs. We identified with the themes of loneliness and rejection in his lyrics. After the first Gulf War, the young in countries such as Saudi Arabia, Iraq and Kuwait listened to his songs for strength and inspiration. I know I did - even if I didn't understand all of the words back then. In many ways - and despite reservations about Washington's recent foreign policy - he was a symbol of America as a land of opportunity, especially for a generation of Arabs that had grown up in conflict.

— Journalist Rym Ghazal, He meant so much to Arabs, The National (Abu Dhabi)

Michael Jackson's influence in Saudi Arabia went beyond just being a pop icon; he became a symbol of cultural transcendence and inspiration for large population of Saudis. In the 1980s, public displays of music and dance were traditionally limited and mostly banned and debunked by the Committee for the Promotion of Virtue and the Prevention of Vice, Michael Jackson's music and dance moves provided a unique outlet for self-expression. Despite his music not being openly distributed, fans listened to Jackson's music through illegal pirated copies and bootlegs made on the black market. Notably, Jackson's unique connection with Prince Al Waleed bin Talal Al Saud saw potential in Jackson, and was instrumental in Jackson's continued success and influence in the Middle East. The two formed a short-lived joint venture called Kingdom Entertainment. In recent years, Saudi Arabia has continued to honor Michael Jackson's legacy through various tribute shows and events. For instance, during the Riyadh Season, a major cultural festival in the capital, Jackson's montages were shown on giant screens every hour from 4:30 PM to midnight, a notable testament to his impact on Saudi people.

=== Soviet Union/Russia ===
Less than a decade before the 1991 cessation of the Soviet Union, Western music was particularly banned in the country. In 1984, New York Times confirmed Sovetskaya Kultura's denouncing stance of Thriller, proliferating the news ''The great show-biz swindle [...] given rise to a kind of euphoria.'' The article also accused Jackson of mesmerizing Americans and keeping them from thinking about political topics, such as violence in Miami or Lebanon, that would make the White House uncomfortable. After the Soviet Union became Russia, publications described Michael Jackson was "perhaps, the focus of all those contradictions between Soviet and later Russian society and the world of Western show business." Prior to his 1993 concert during the Dangerous World Tour, Michael Jackson's first appearance in the Soviet Union actually came during a promotional campaign with the Pepsi Corporation, where Jackson was starred in the first ever American advertisements shown on Soviet television. The TV spots were aired to an estimated 150,000,000 viewers within the Soviet Union making it one of the most watched broadcasts of all time.

A documentary Michael Jackson - Moscow Case 1993: When the King of Pop Met the Soviets detail events after the 1993 Michael Jackson sexual abuse allegations, leading up to his controversial 1993 Dangerous World Tour Moscow, Russia concert, six days before the 1993 Russian constitutional crisis arose. Jackson had been escorted by the Russian police, and met with Moscow's first-standing mayor Yuri Luzhkov. The early morning of the concert, several confusing events were reported: ticket sales stagnated at 50,000 of total 70,000 seats, though the booths had a "sold out" sign and office was closed for further sale. It had been raining and following reports of a bomb threat as well as news Michael's team brought drugs, had police officers stop activities to search the premises, such that intelligence agents dragged a police officer who was found under the stage stairs. No drugs or bomb were found. Some ticketless audience that had gathered around the stadium were allowed entry despite organizers having lost money. As it was an open-air concert, spectators were drenched, and also reportedly drunk.

Indeed, Jackson's ascent to the heights of fame occurred during an era of critical change in the Soviet Union (and all those governments that arose in its place). This era was also life-changing on the question of how Soviet popular culture related to global trends and developments. One can speak of "progress" in this case without any irony. [...] Indeed, six days later, Boris Yeltsin would issue Decree No. 1400 on the Dissolution of the Supreme Soviet, thus laying the foundation for the bloody events of October 3–4. It was precisely this time that most clearly separated the Soviet period from the history of post-Soviet Russia. And in the fact that the last days of Soviet history culminated in a carnival involving Michael Jackson, one can see some kind of sad irony, not to mention in the fact that the concert actually ended in failure: the stage at Luzhniki Stadium failed to operate at full capacity under the heavy rain, and the public was drenched under the old and still unequipped roof. As a parenthetical note, this concert was one of the last non-sports events that took place before the arena was closed for reconstruction. It was from this point that the "Era of Luzhkov" began.

— Michael Jackson and Contemporary Russian History, Russkiy Mir Foundation

The events in the past months up to September 1993 and the concert greatly impacted Jackson's health and led to the cancellation of the rest of his tour by November. It would also inspire his song "Stranger in Moscow".

== Tabloid media ==
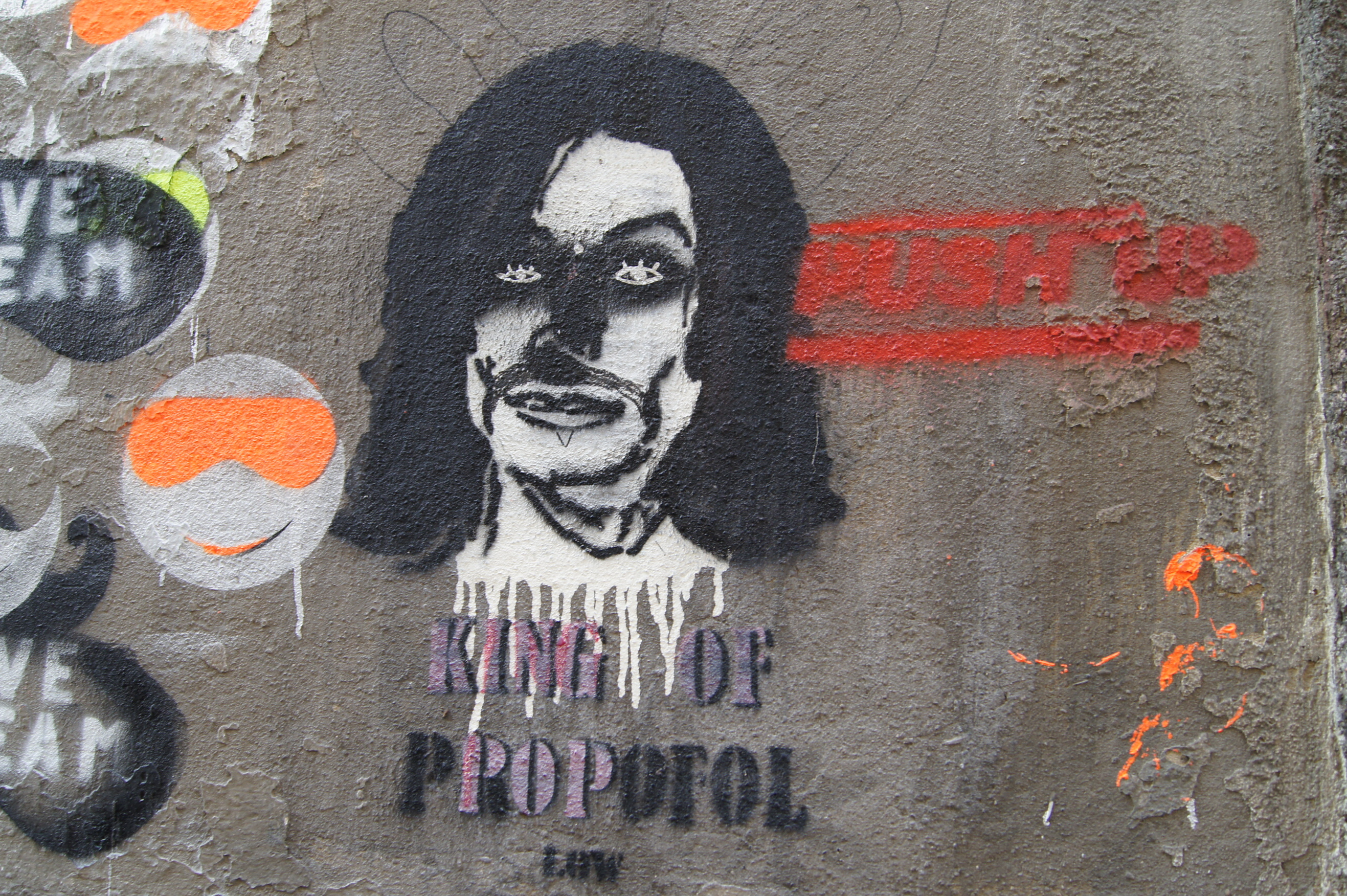
One of a few "King of Propofol" graffities of Jackson in Porto

The Michael Jackson cacophony is fascinating in that it is not about Jackson at all. I hope he has the good sense to know it and the good fortune to snatch his life out of the jaws of a carnivorous success. He will not swiftly be forgiven for having turned so many tables, for he damn sure grabbed the brass ring, and the man who broke the bank at Monte Carlo has nothing on Michael. All that noise is about America, as the dishonest custodian of black life and wealth; the blacks, especially males, in America; and the burning, buried American guilt; and sex and sexual roles and sexual panic; money, success, and despair—to all of which may now be added the bitter need to find a head on which to place the crown of Miss America.

— James Baldwin, "Freaks and the American Ideal of Manhood" (1985)

At the height of his fame, during the 1980s, Jackson began to embrace and perpetuate the public perception of his strangeness. Jackson (and his publicity team) and the media worked in tandem to cultivate this image. Early tabloid stories of his being obsessed with the Elephant Man's bones and sleeping in an "oxygen chamber" were possibly publicity stunts. Around this time, the tabloid newspaper The Sun began nicknaming Jackson "Wacko Jacko", a name he came to despise. Other tabloids and media outlets soon followed. The nickname stayed with Jackson for the rest of his career. Stories about him gradually turned negative. In Vogel's description: "Critics maligned him for buying the Beatles catalog [in 1985], mocked his changing appearance, called him a sissy, questioned whether he actually wrote his songs, reduced his art to commercial ephemera." His marriage to Lisa Marie Presley and rumours of him undergoing skin-whitening and other cosmetic surgery furthered the controversy surrounding Jackson's image and made him the subject of sensationalist biographies.

Writing in British Vogue in 1987, Barney Hoskyns said that Jackson occupied a "superstar stratosphere of his own" and part of the public's misunderstanding of the star was "because we so want to know him – as we want to know anyone that famous". Hoskyns described the tabloid image of Jackson as "despicable ... distortions", but nevertheless opined: "Michael Jackson represents a terrible, pitiful corruption of what a twenty-nine-year-old human being really should be ... His neurotic obsession with perfecting his physical appearance apparently knows no bounds. And his inability to enjoy meaningful relations with anyone except animals, small children and cartoon characters has become ridiculous. This is, in short, a singularly maladjusted young man." The Rolling Stone editors also attribute the media speculation partly to the singer's elusiveness and obsession with privacy, and add: "the massive public soul-searching the [1993] allegations against Jackson inspired were but one indication of the almost inestimable role he has played in shaping not only pop music but pop culture."

Susan Fast, writing for the same publication, gives a more sympathetic view of Jackson: "While some of [his] difference was demonstrated through what was viewed in the mass media as 'eccentric' behavior […] it was really his more substantive(sic), underlying differences that were most troubling—racial, gendered, able-bodied/disabled, child/teenager/adult, adult man who loved children, father/mother." She writes that Jackson's persona was "so unsettling to the hegemonic order that it had to be contained through ridicule, misinterpretation, sensationalism, and finally criminal indictment". It is generally regarded as unusual for a man to want to be a single parent, Fast continues, to adore children like a mother; the thought of a man obsessed with cosmetics and appearance agitated the public to disbelieve the idea of him being an object of heterosexual desire. Fast argues that such perceptions, which stemmed from anxieties of masculinity, despite the fact that he created highly heterosexual art like "Black or White" and "In the Closet"; extended to the public perception of Jackson's alleged child molestation rooted in absence of masculinity.

Scholars have described the widely acknowledged and often polarizing perception of Jackson as a postmodern spectacle, causing the "real Michael Jackson" to remain elusive. In an article for Popular Music & Society, Brian Rossiter commented:

The media, aware of the marketable potential of Jackson's ambiguities, consistently used them to manufacture the notion of an authentic or private self behind his public persona. […] Audiences were always given liberty to select which Michael Jackson they deemed to be the real or authentic one […].

== Influence on other performers ==
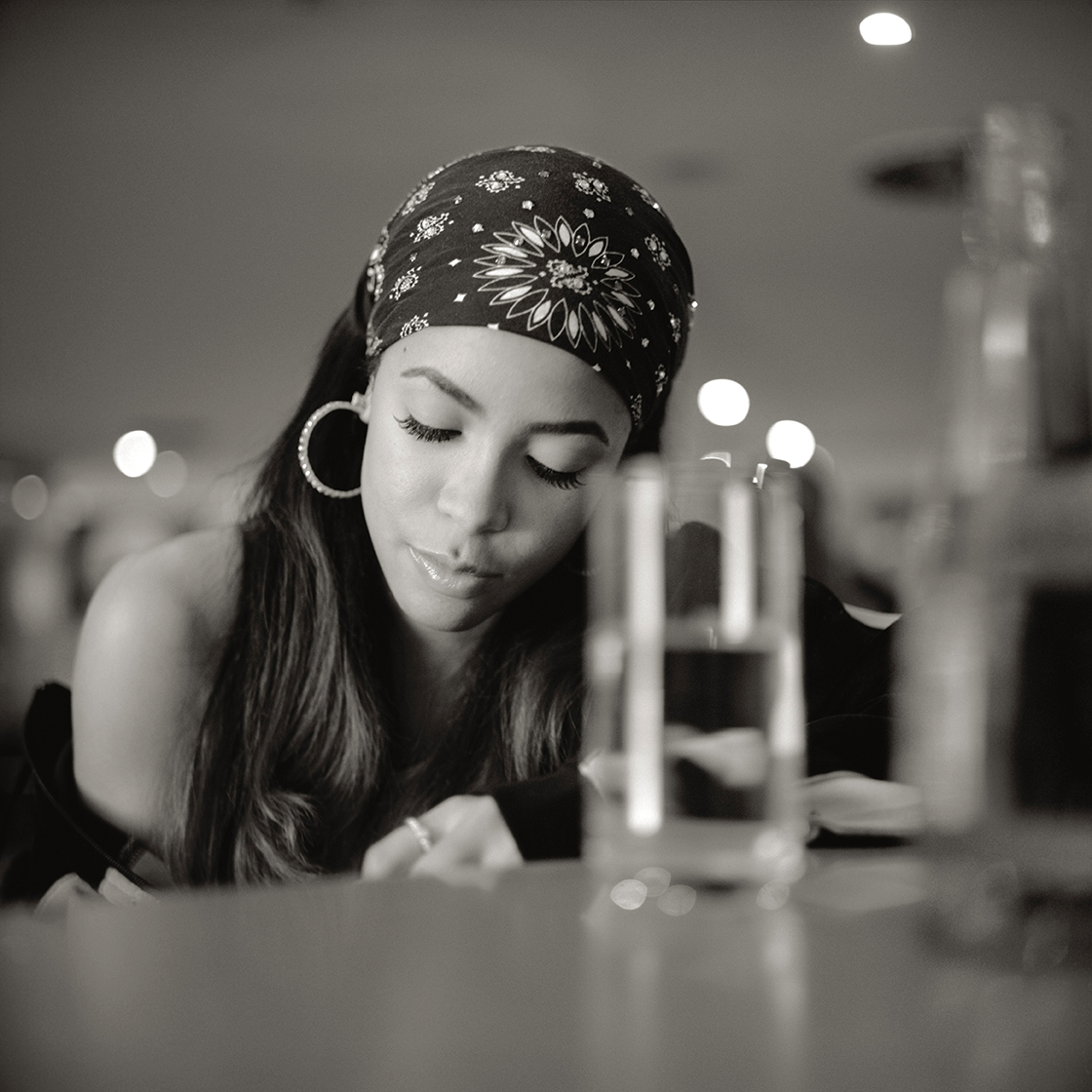
Aaliyah

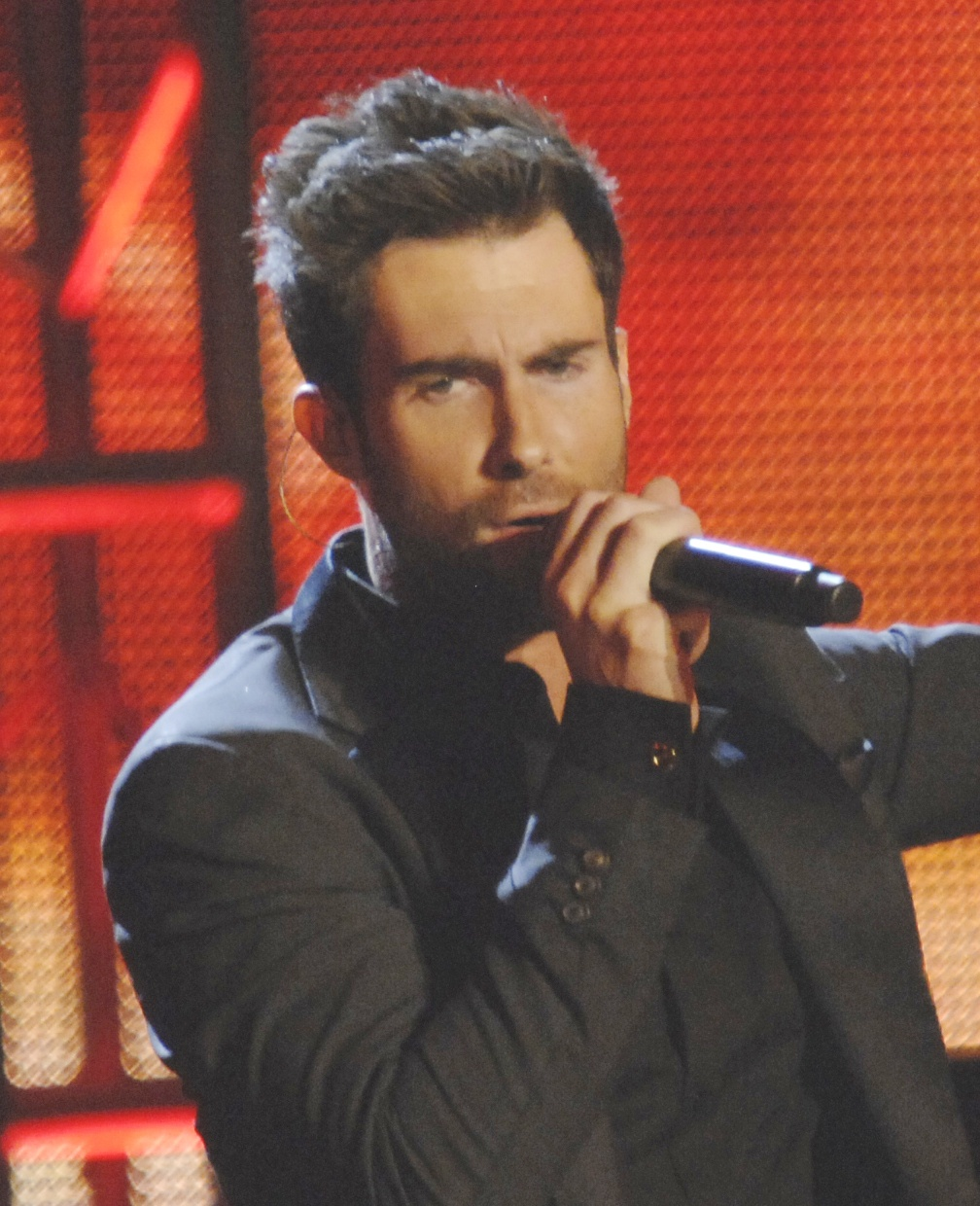
Adam Levine

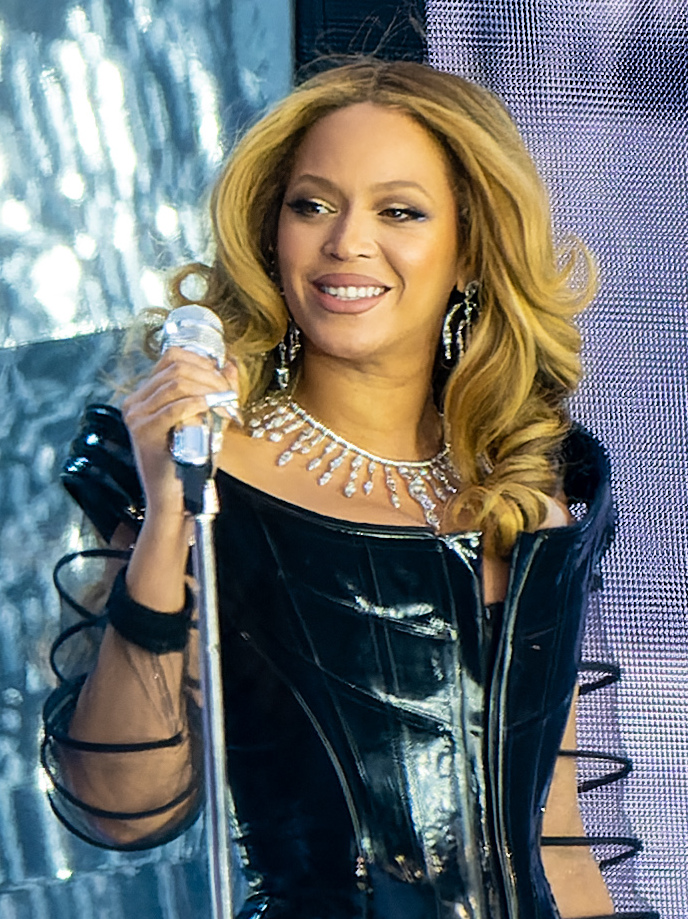
Beyoncé

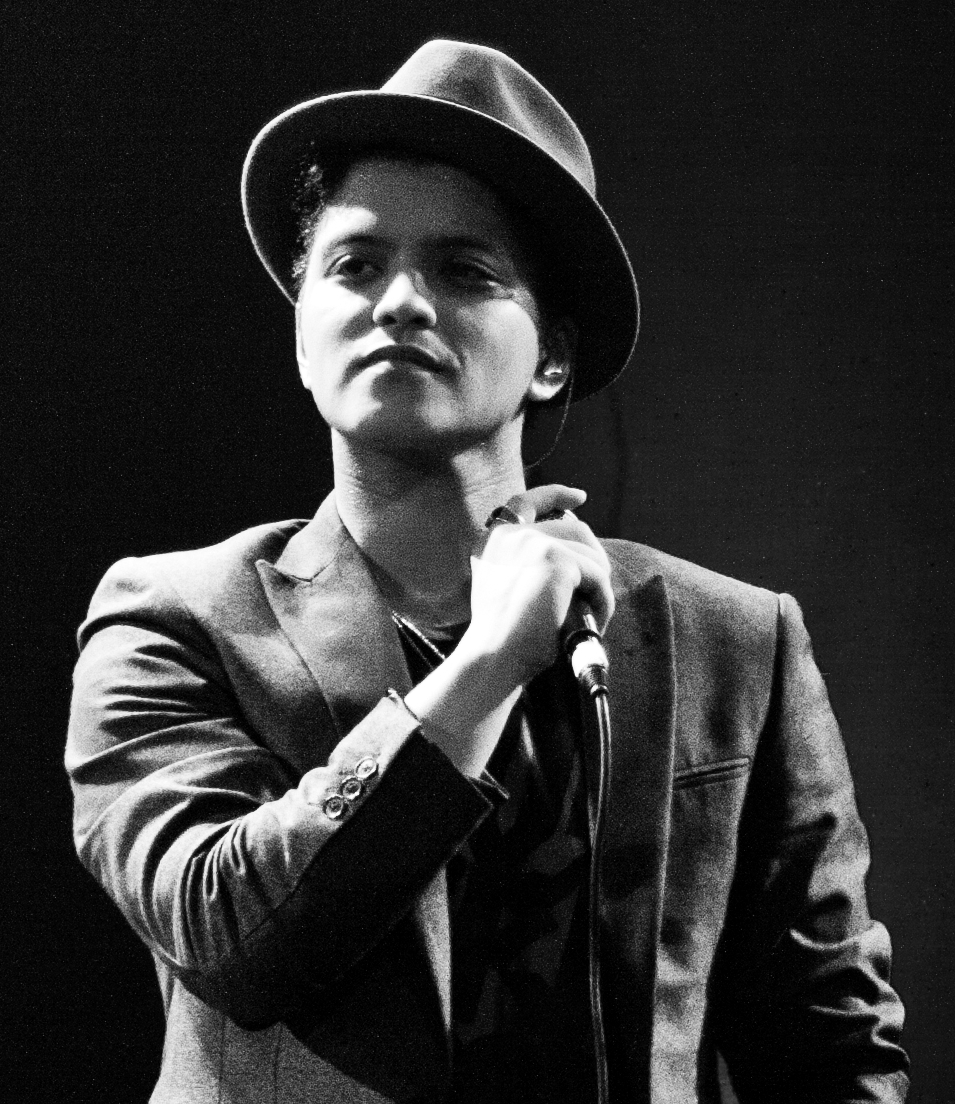
Bruno Mars

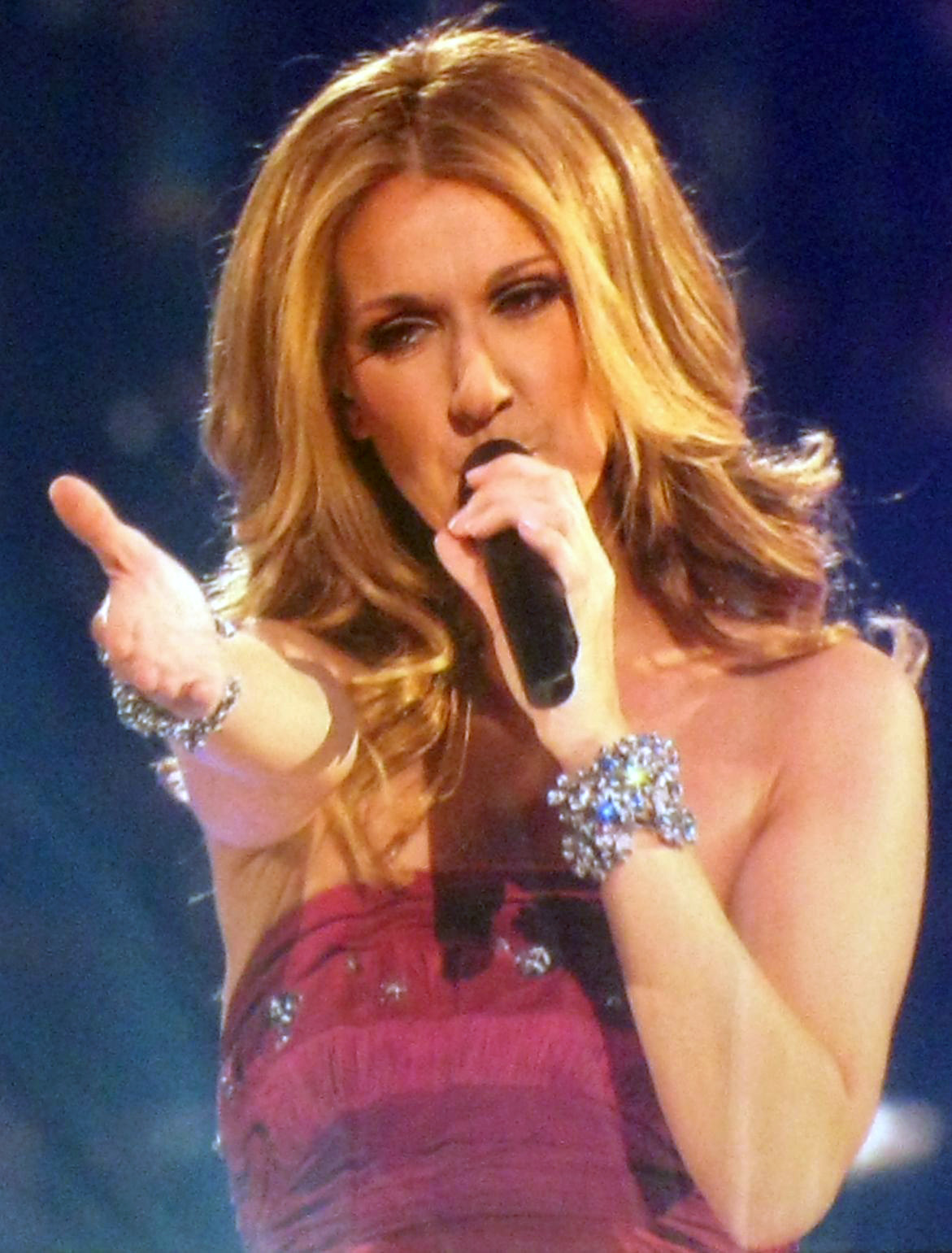
Celine Dion

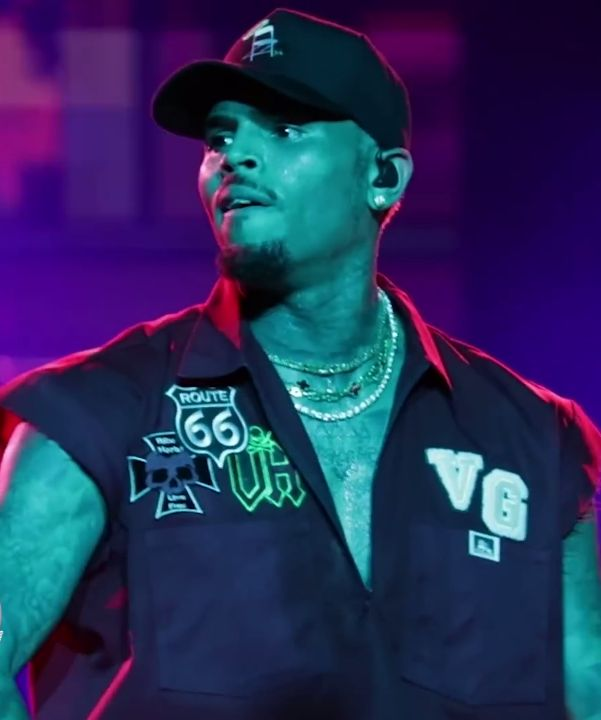
Chris Brown

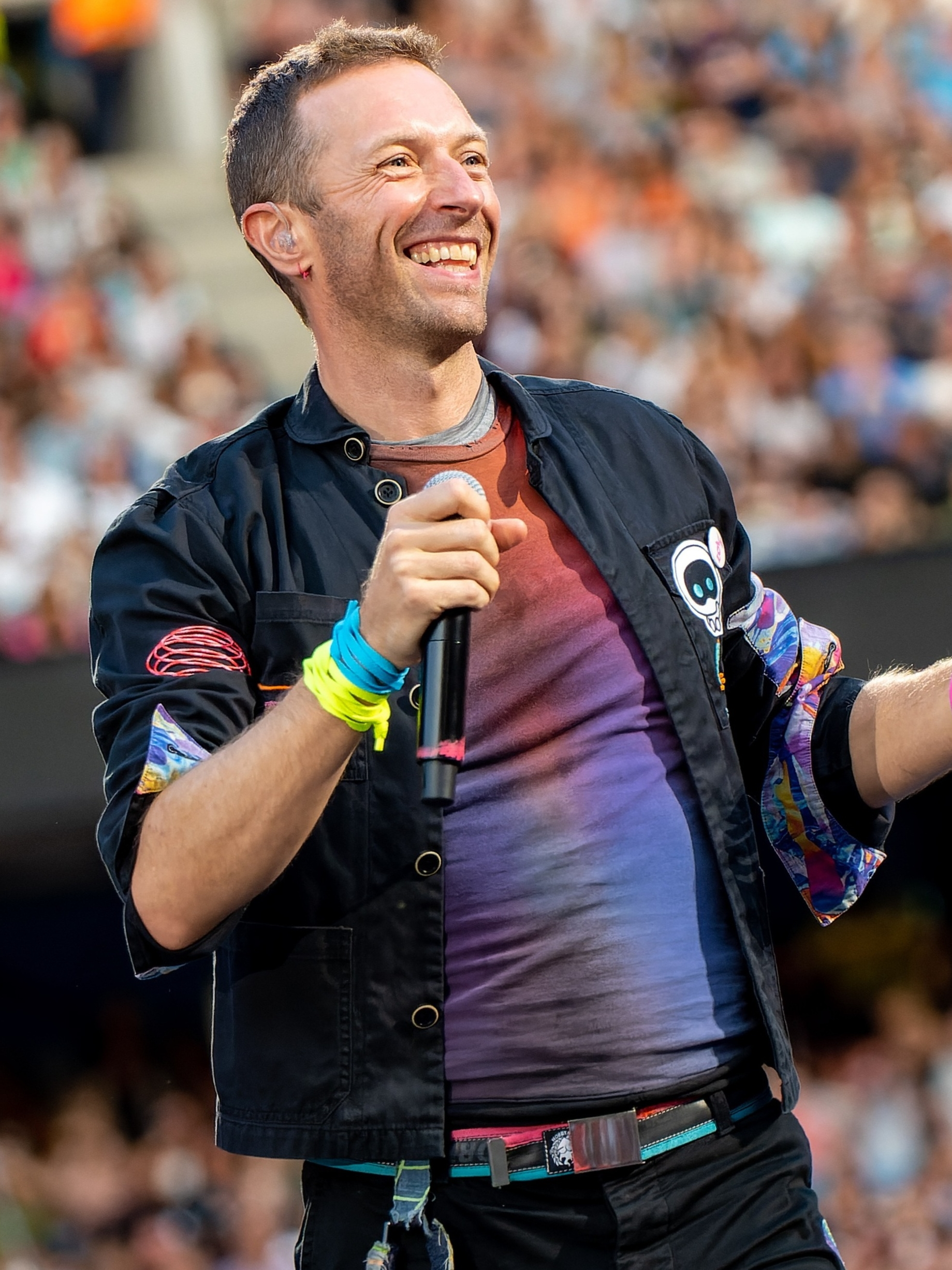
Chris Martin of Coldplay

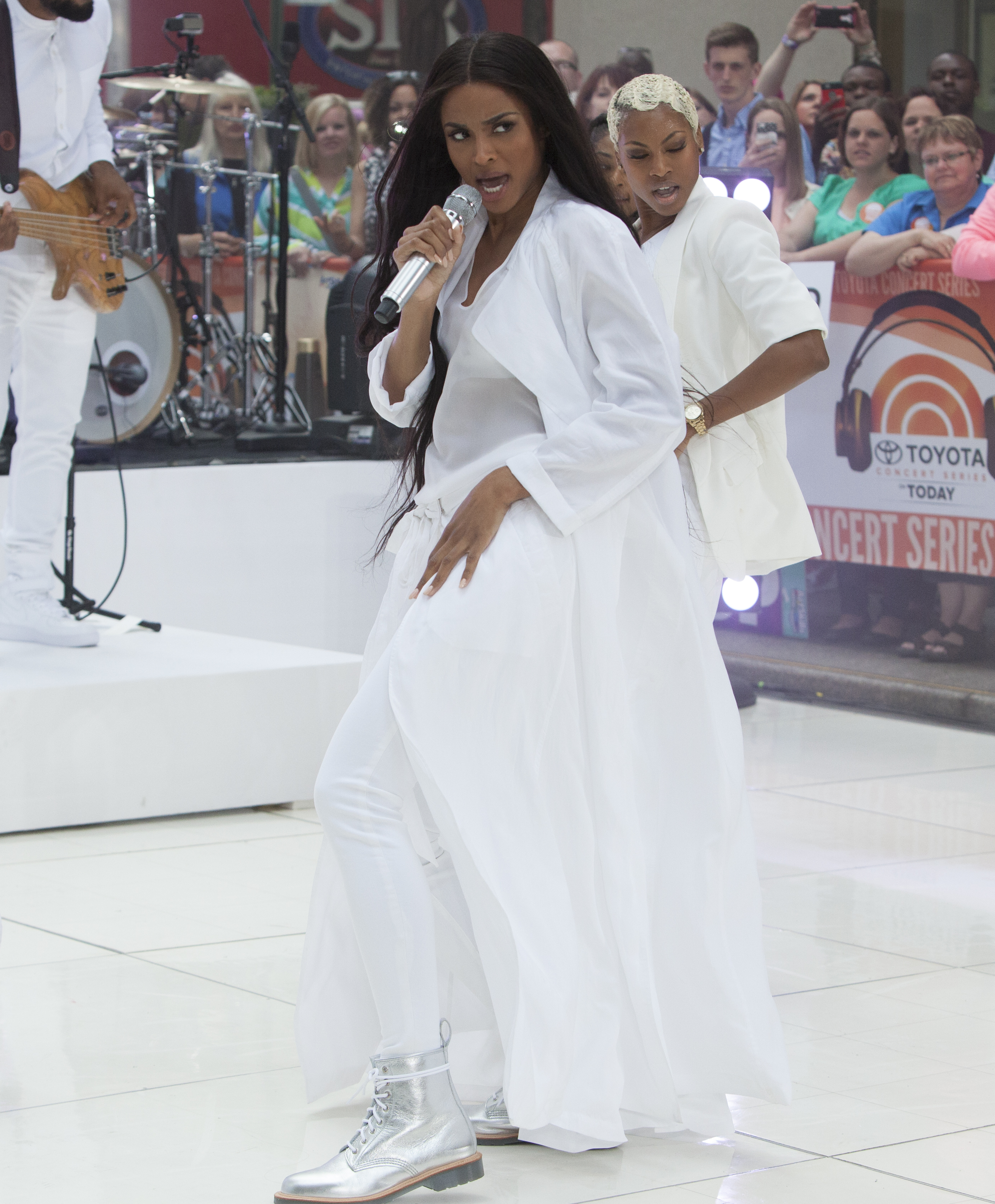
Ciara

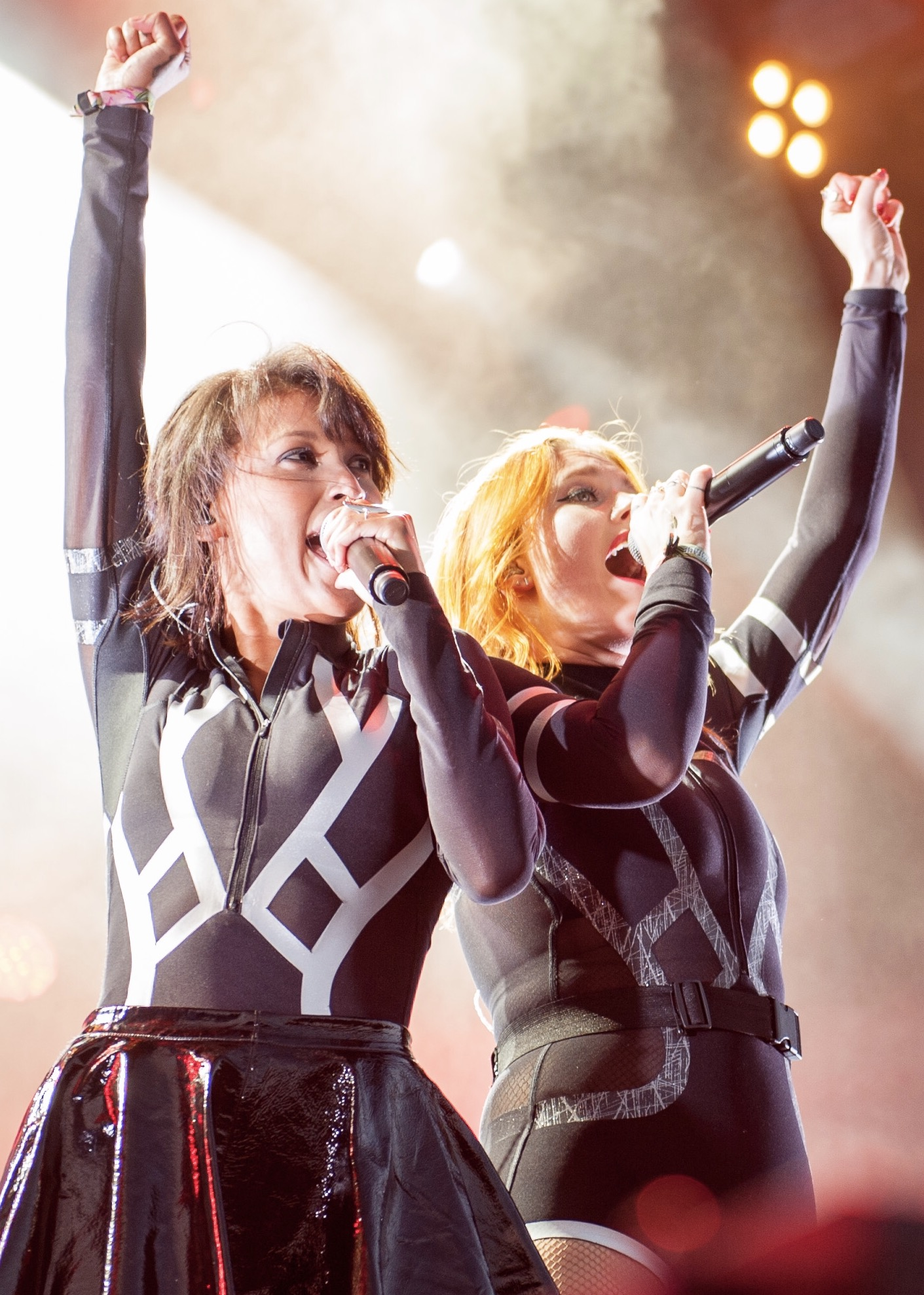
Icona Pop

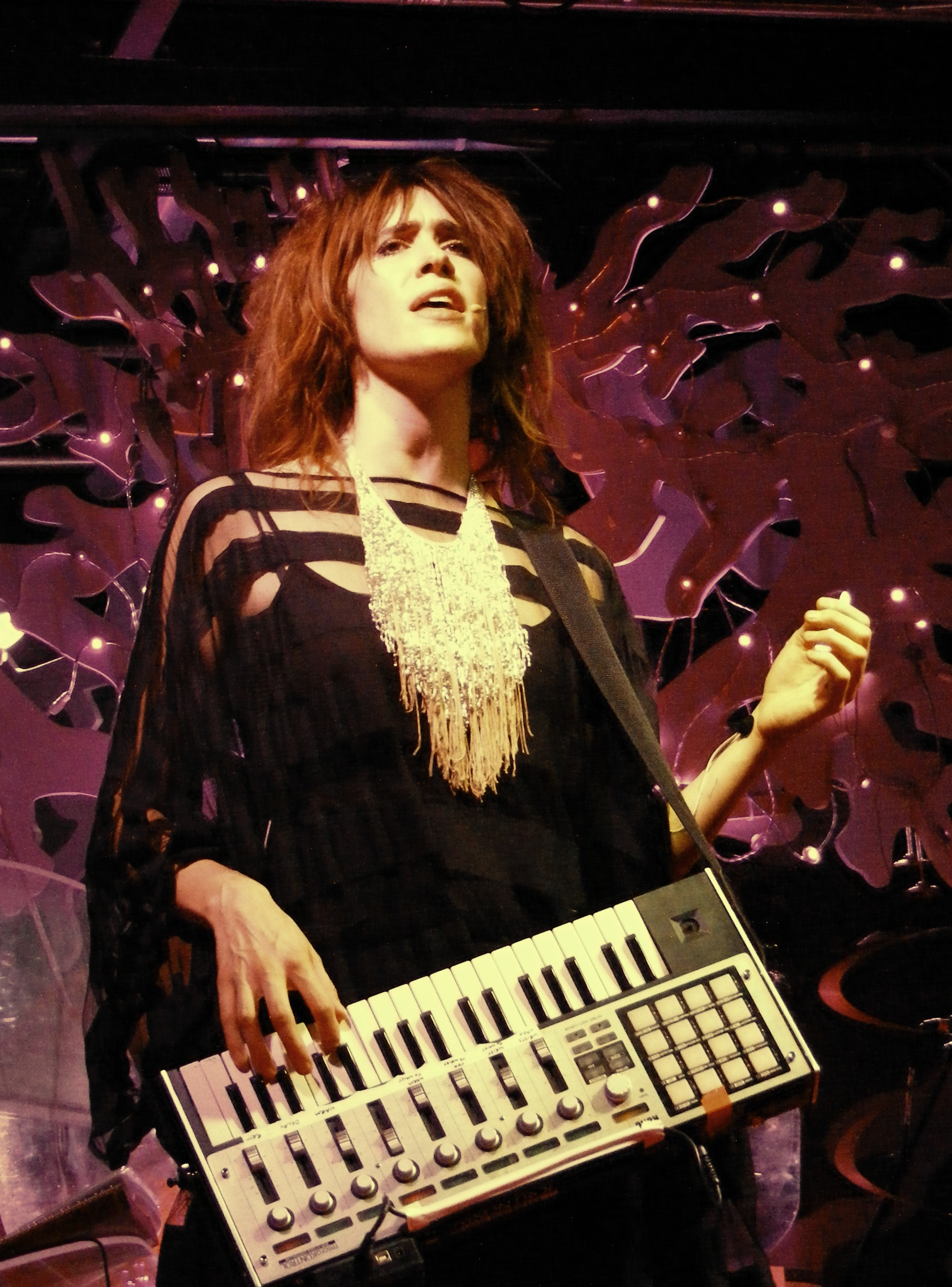
Imogen Heap

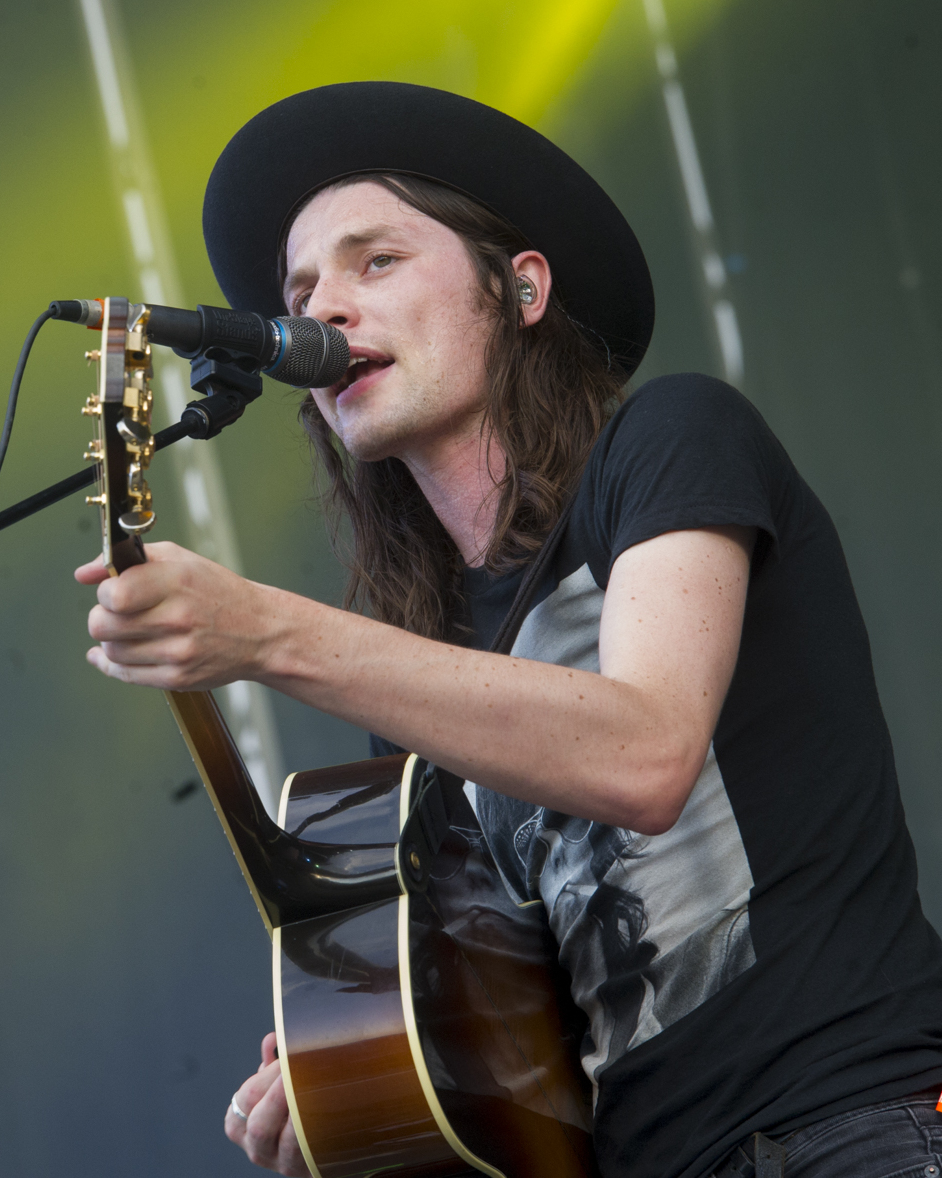
James Bay

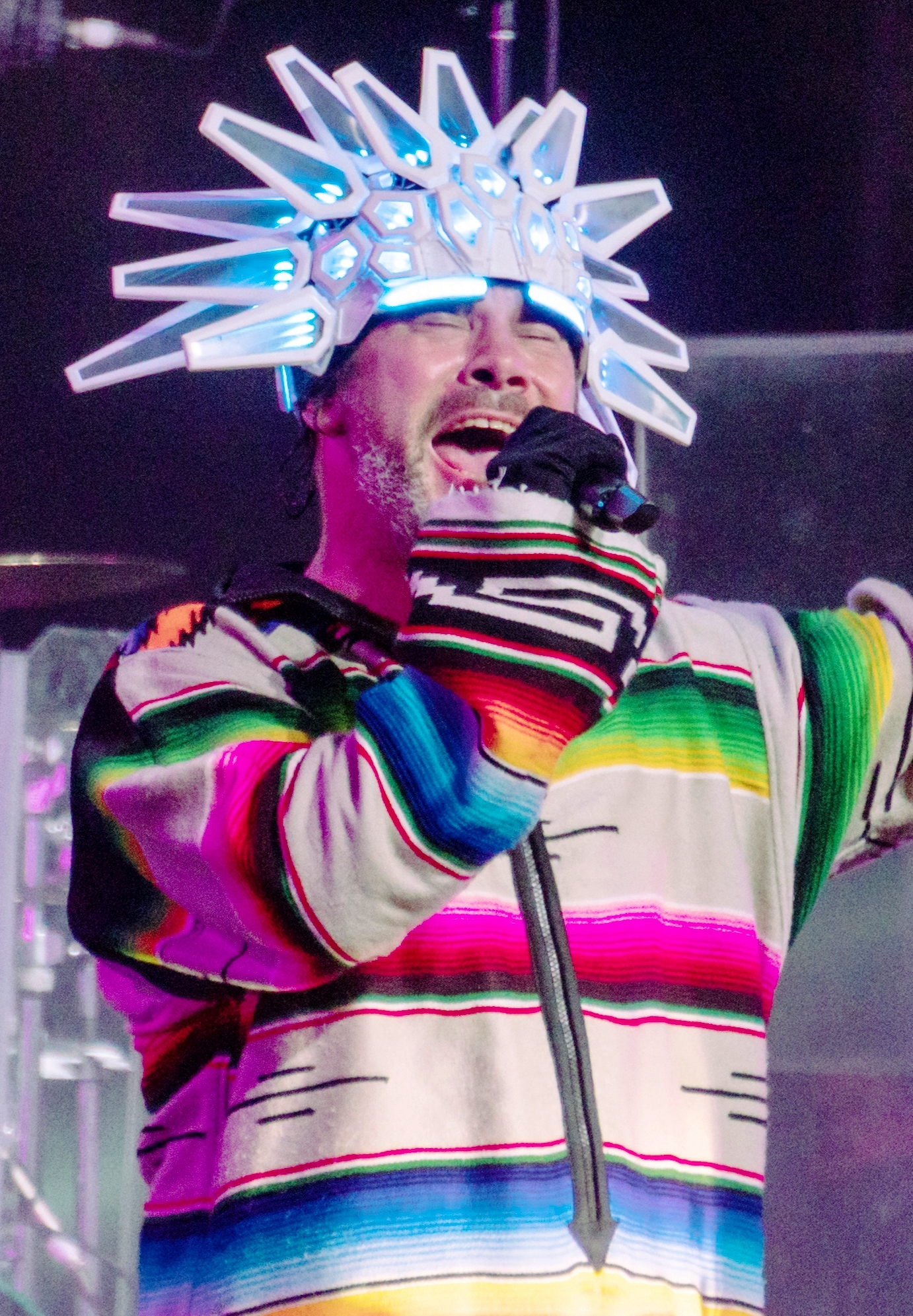
Jay Kay of Jamiroquai

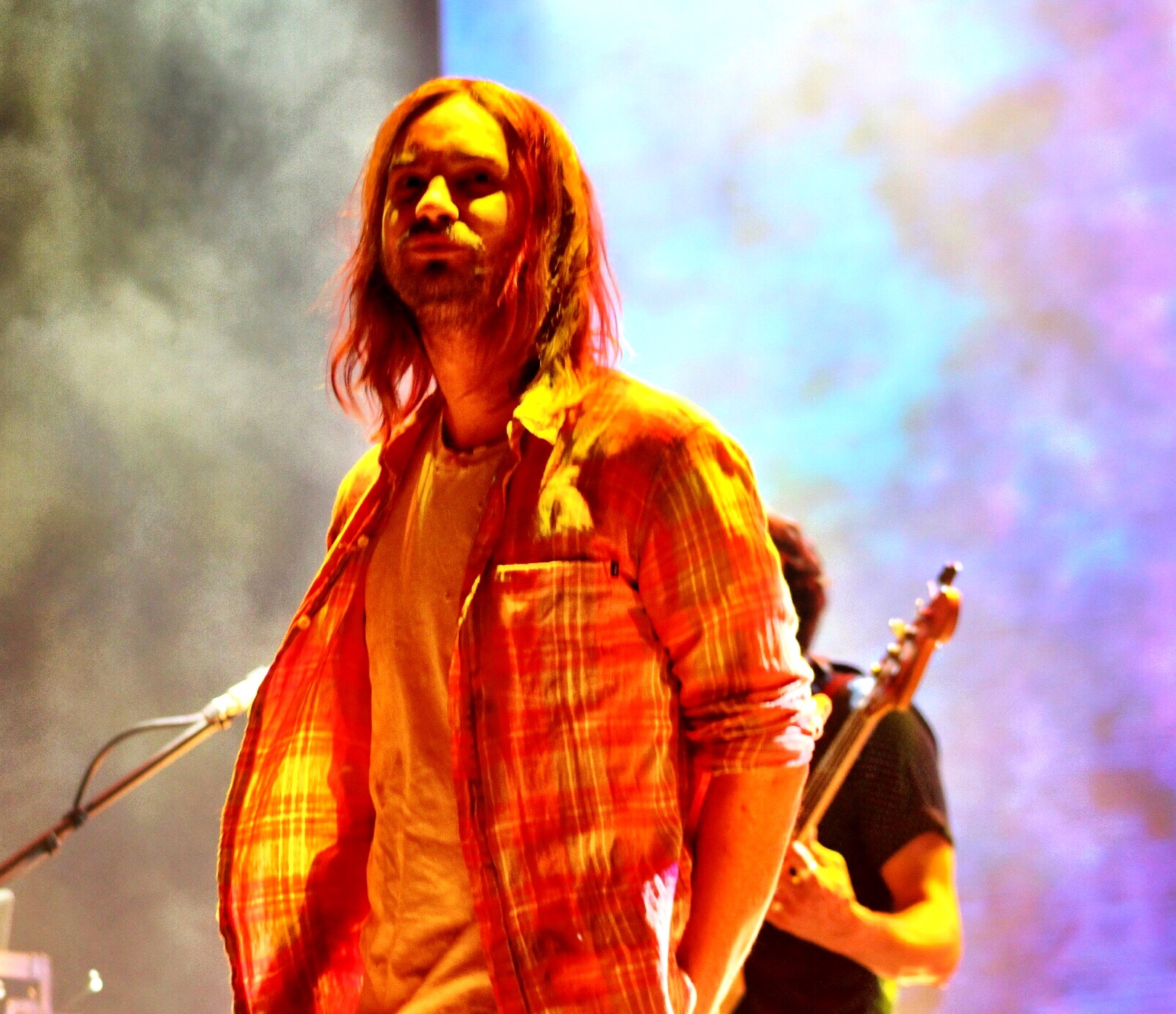
Kevin Parker of Tame Impala

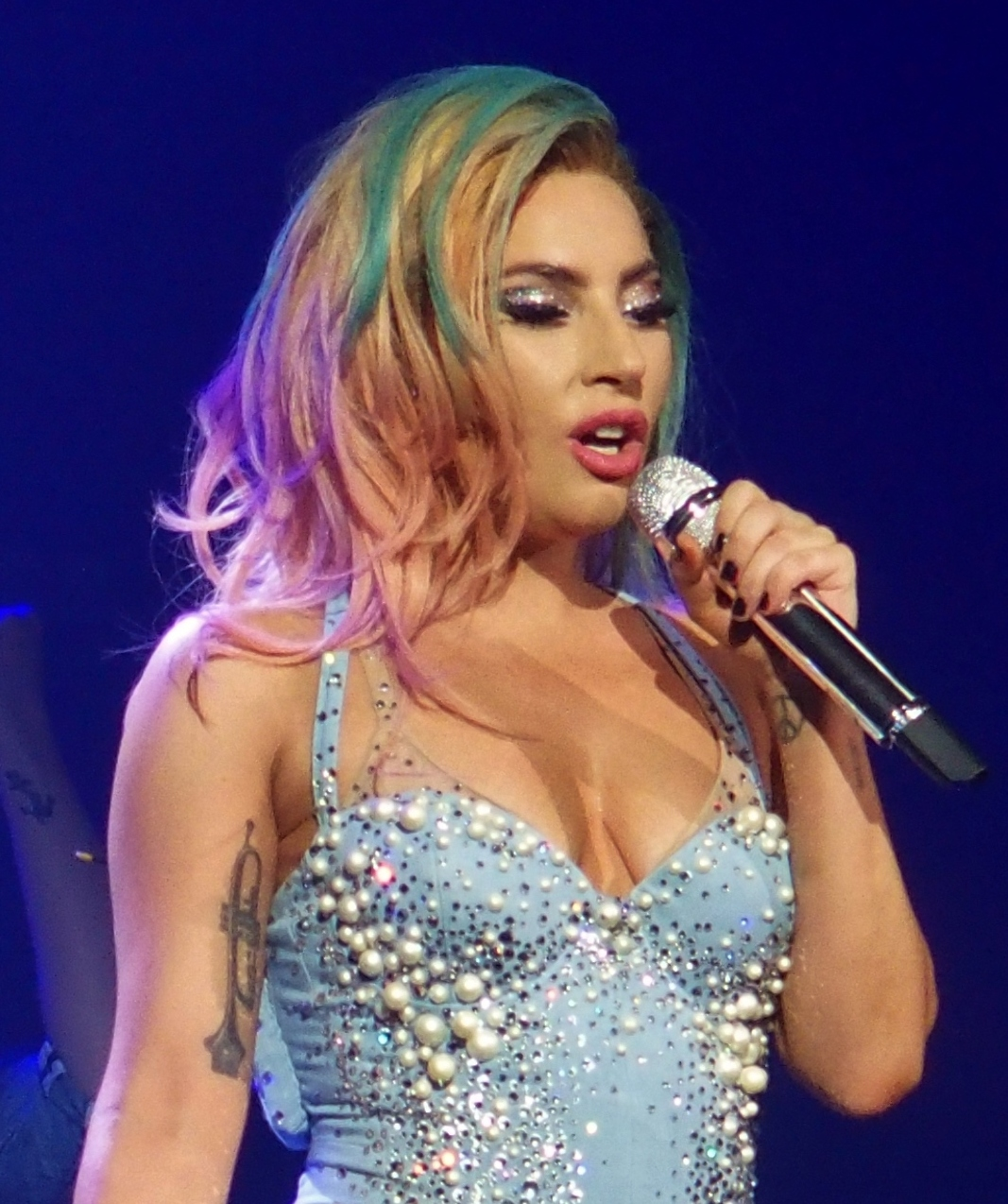
Lady Gaga

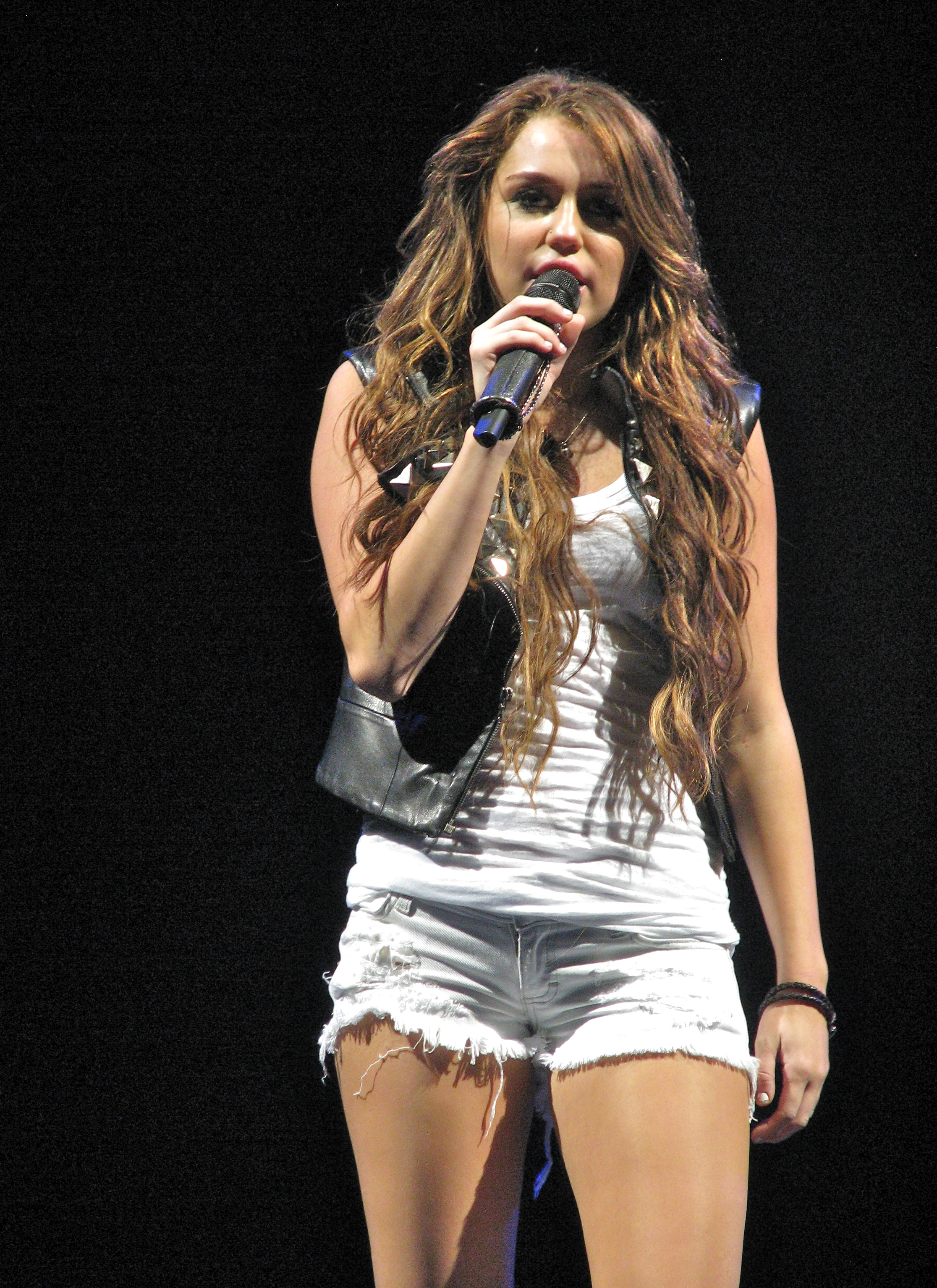
Miley Cyrus

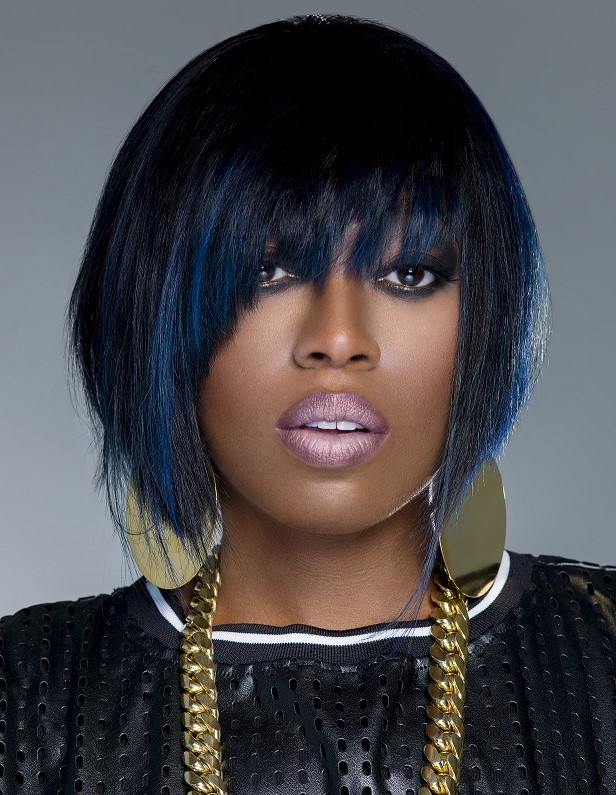
Missy Elliott

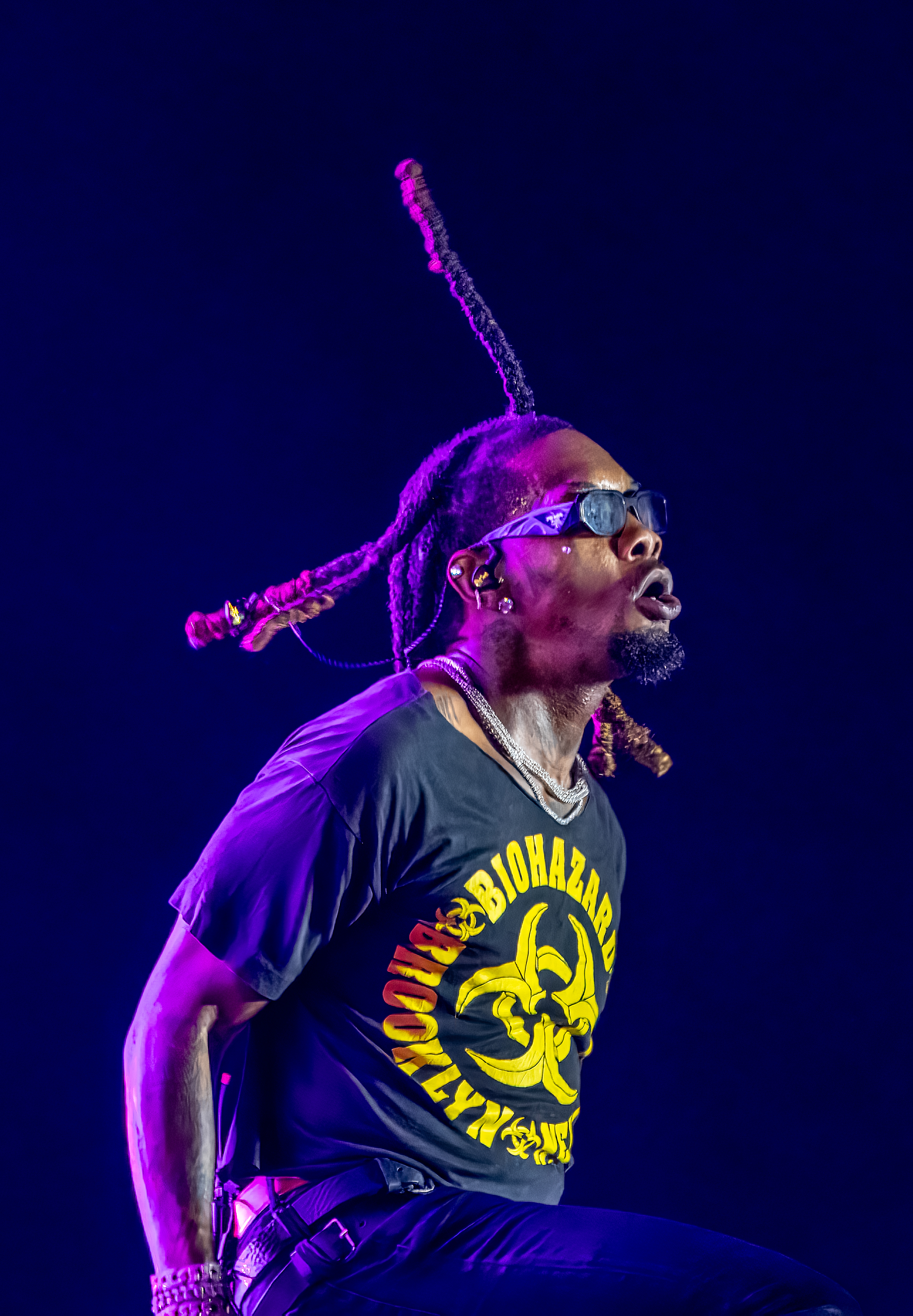
Offset

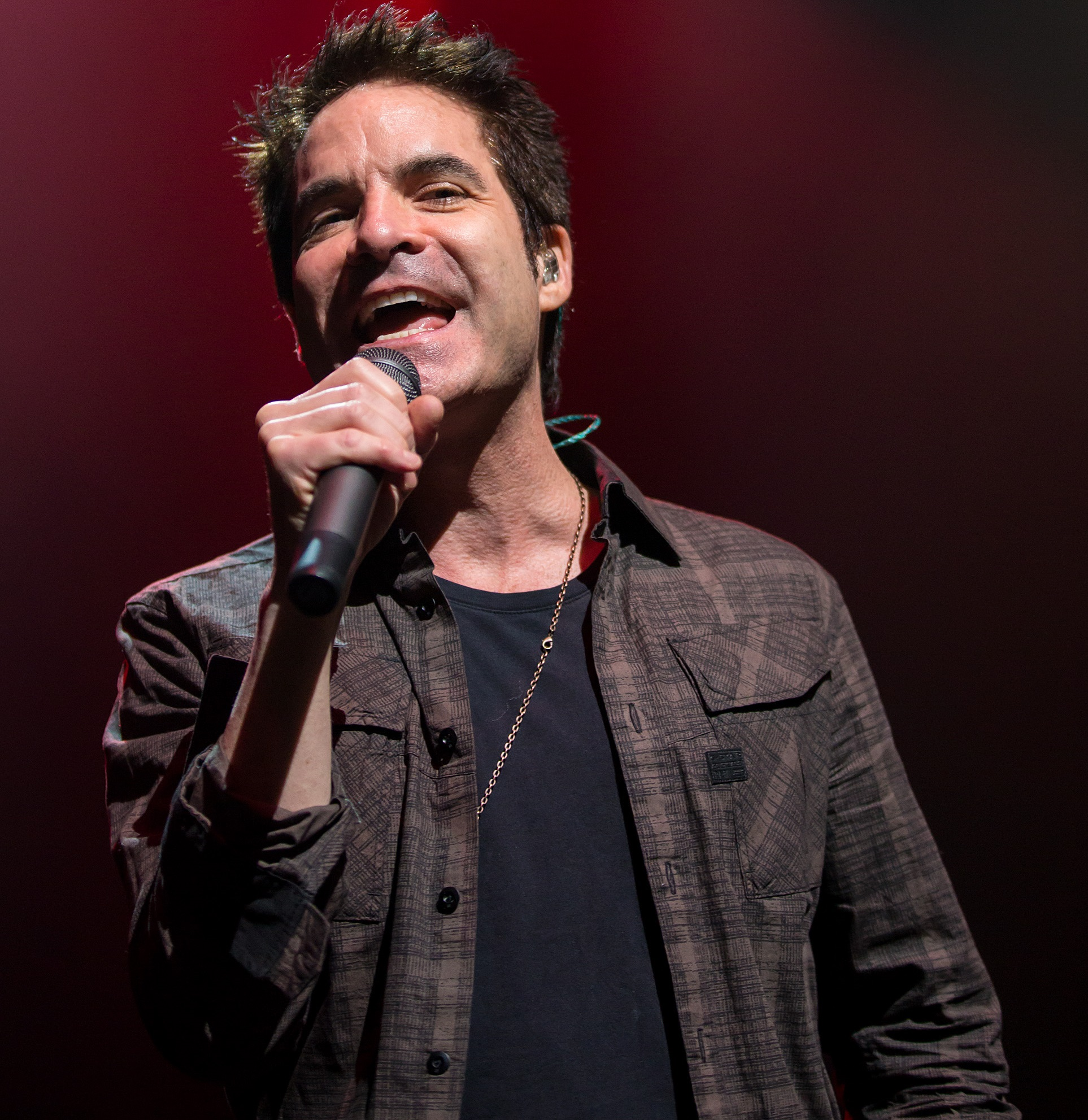
Pat Monahan of Train

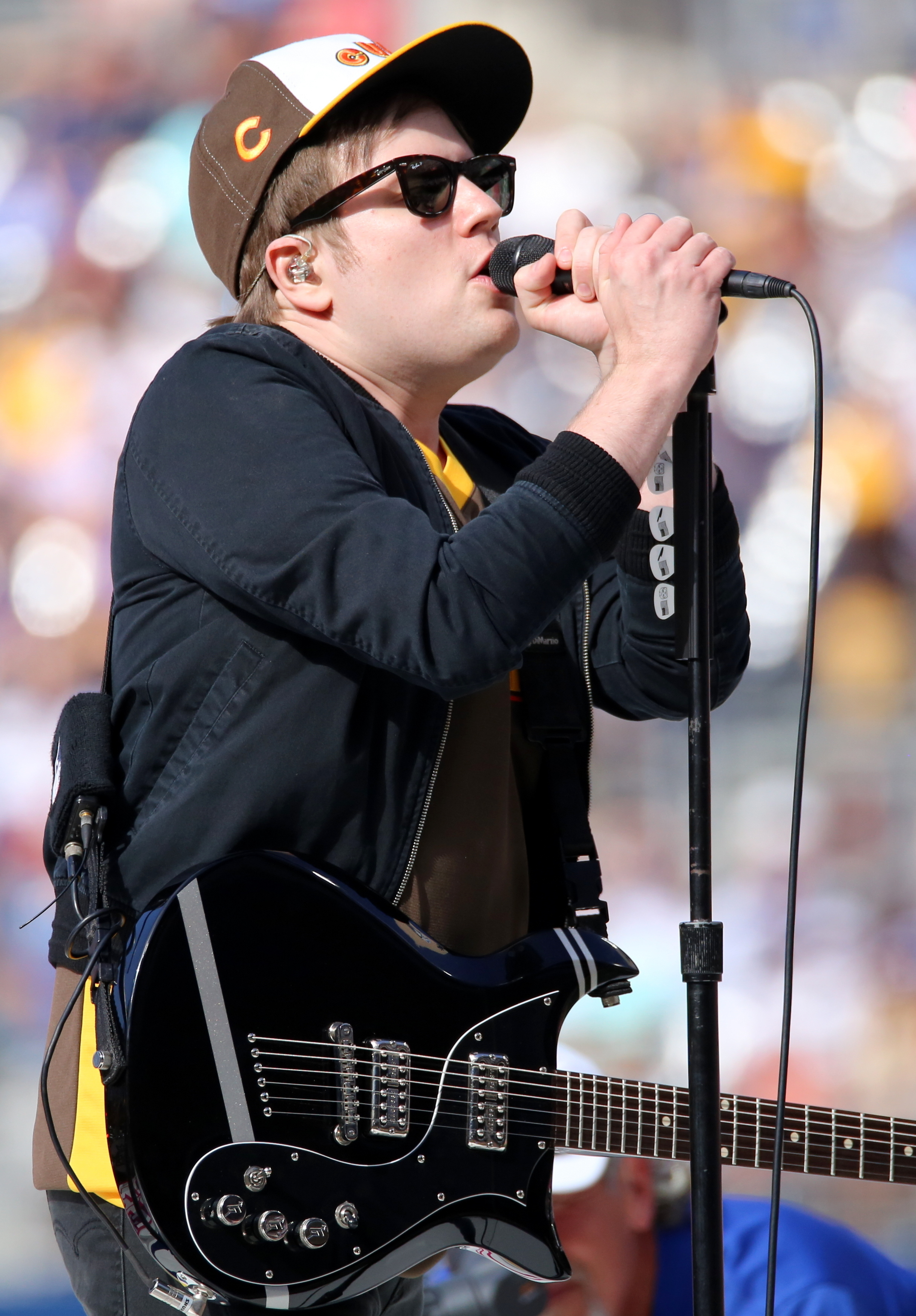
Patrick Stump of Fall Out Boy

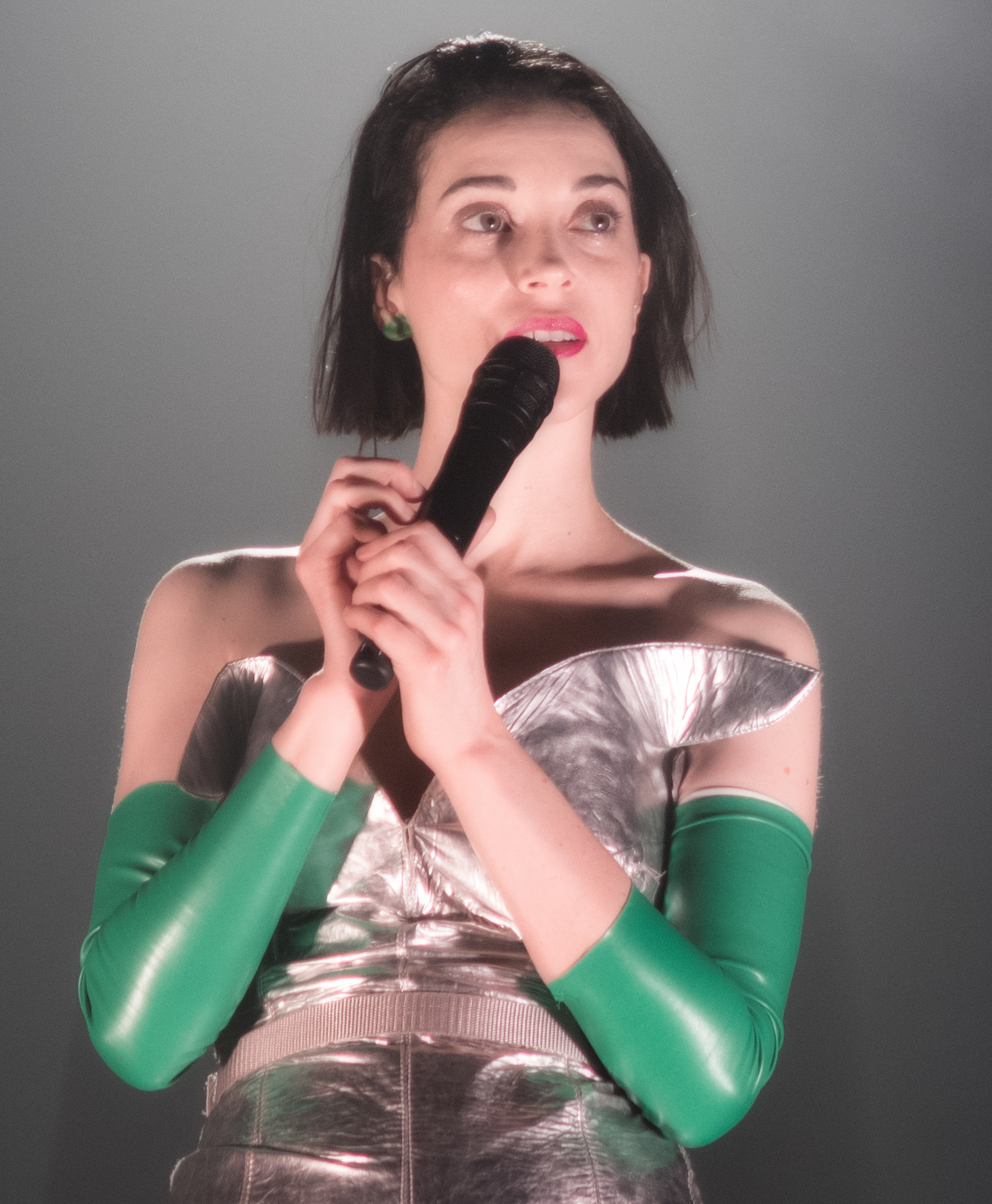
St. Vincent

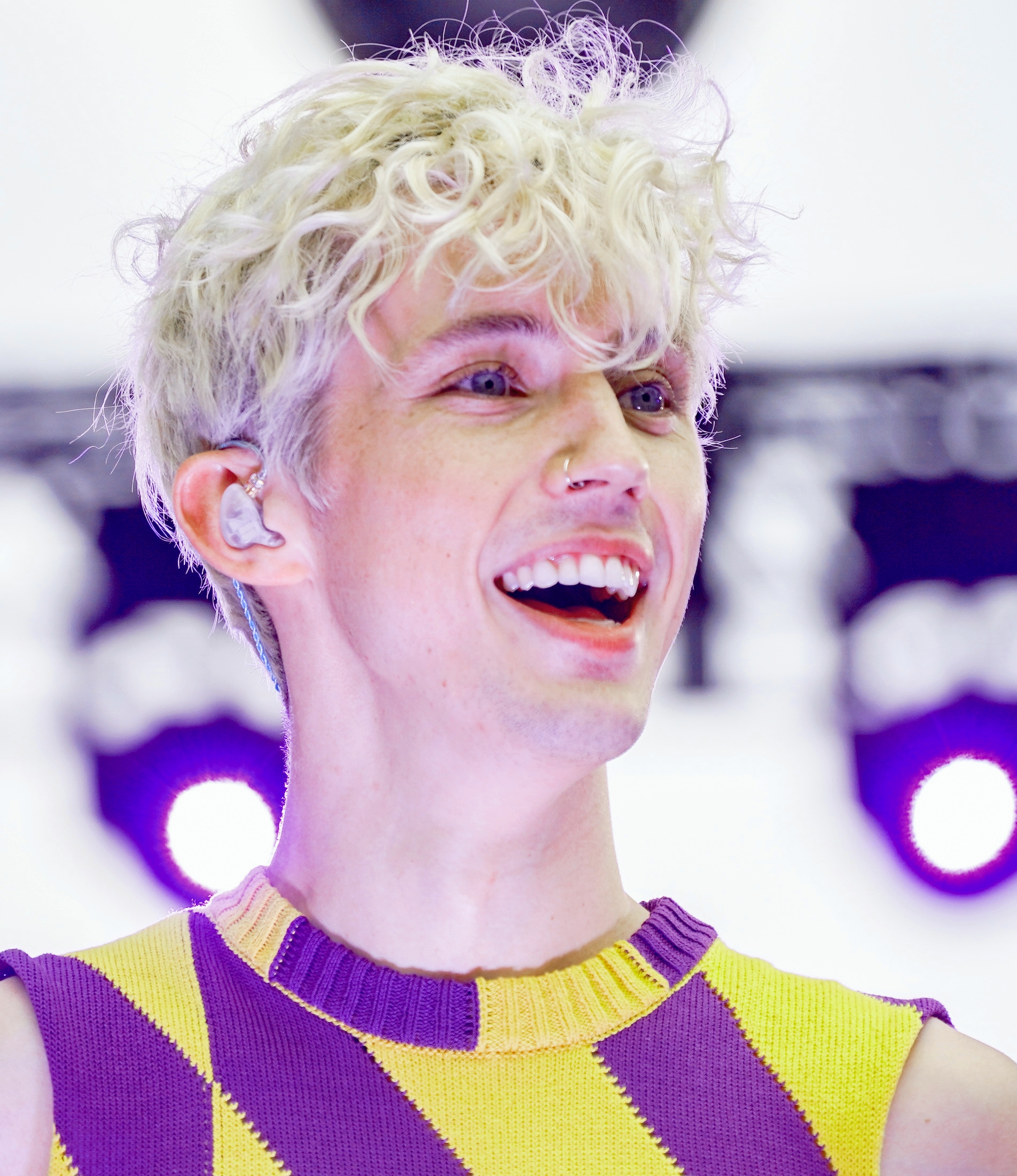
Troye Sivan

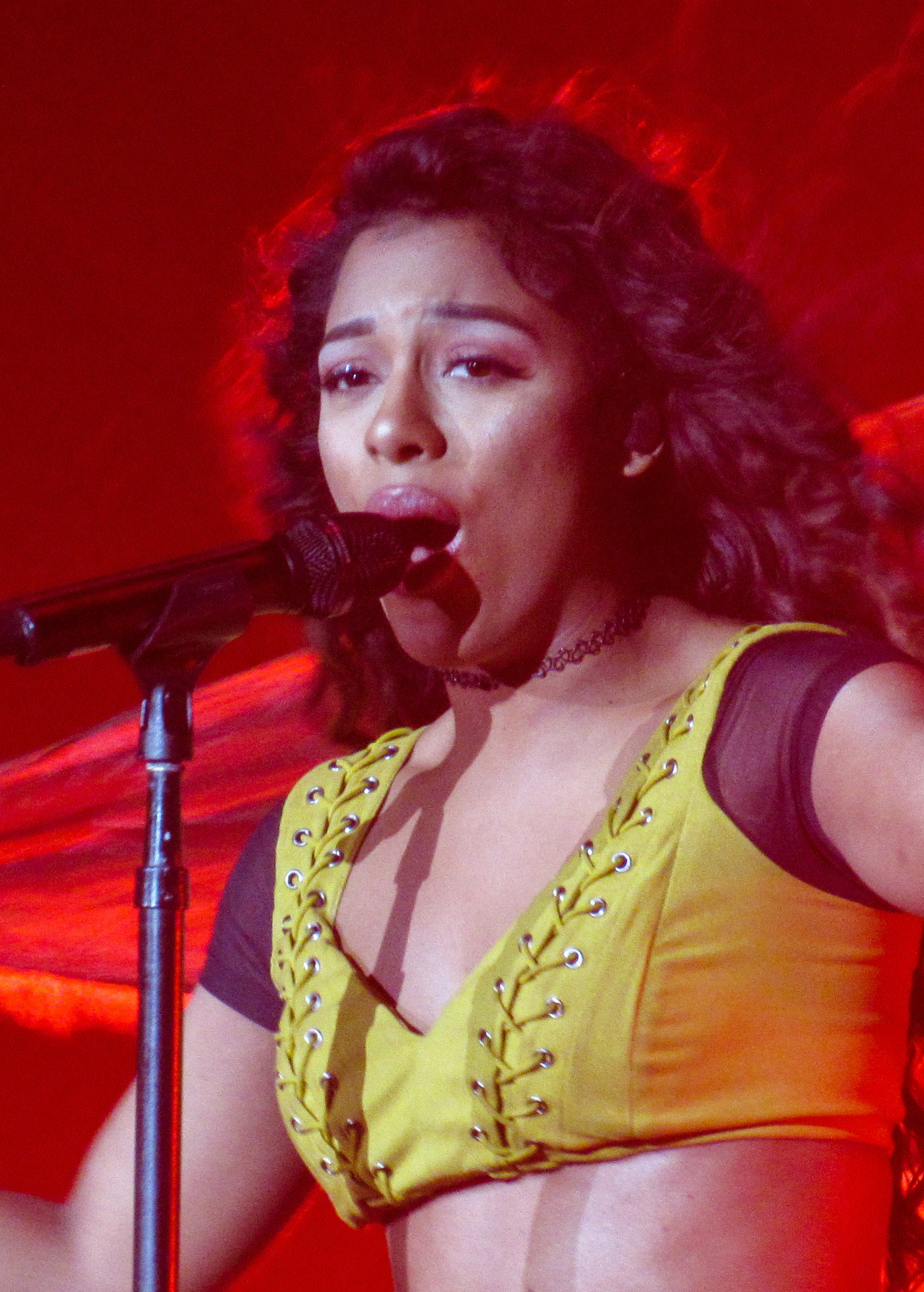
Victoria Monét

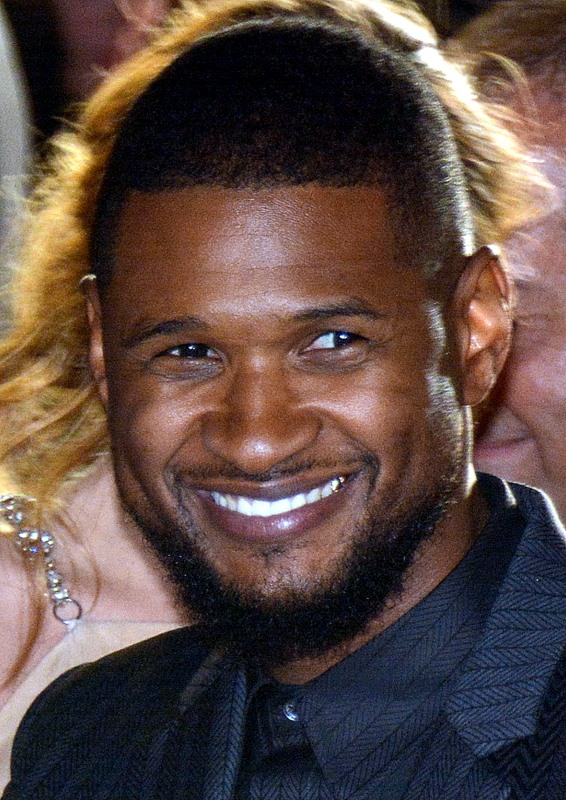
Usher

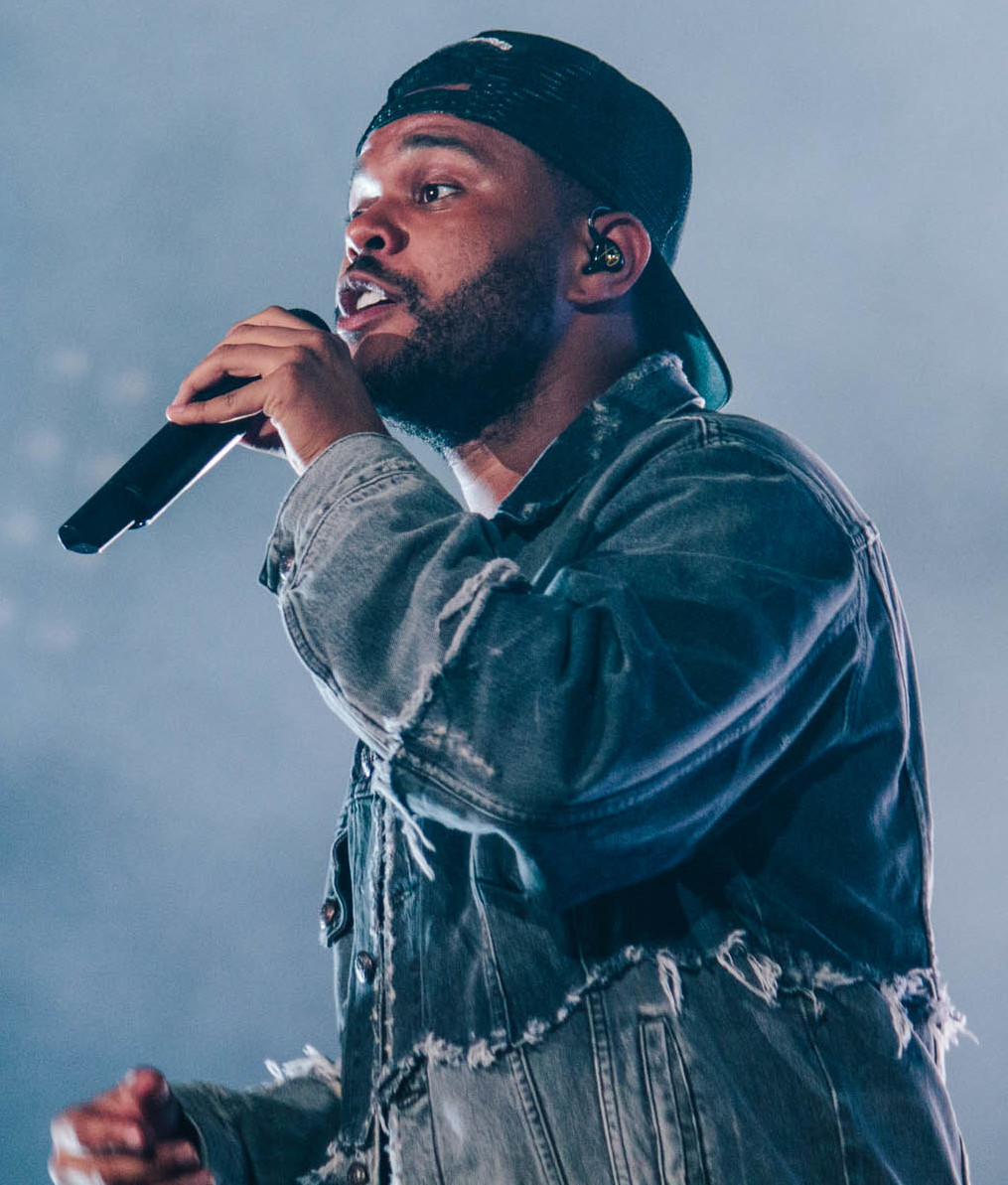
The Weeknd

Michael Jackson influenced a wide range of musicians across the 20th and 21st centuries, particularly those known for experimental and performance-driven styles.

Rolling Stone narrates, "Trying to trace Michael Jackson's influence on the pop stars that followed him is like trying to trace the influence of oxygen and gravity. So vast, far-reaching and was his impact". Jackson's use of diverse genres extended his reach from singers, to rappers, composers, and DJs such as David Guetta and Mark Ronson who studied and reinterpreted his work. As gathered on WhoSampled, Jackson's music has been officially covered, remixed or sampled a combined estimate of 4,380 times (not including unverified releases) by other artists; which is among the top ten most reinterpreted music artists in modern history. Over the years, hundreds of artists have specifically cite Michael Jackson as being their early inspiration, or reference him in their creative process, or as a specified influence.

=== Earliest inspiration ===
Major soloists have spoken of Michael Jackson's pivotal effect on their dream of becoming a singer or as an early inspiration:

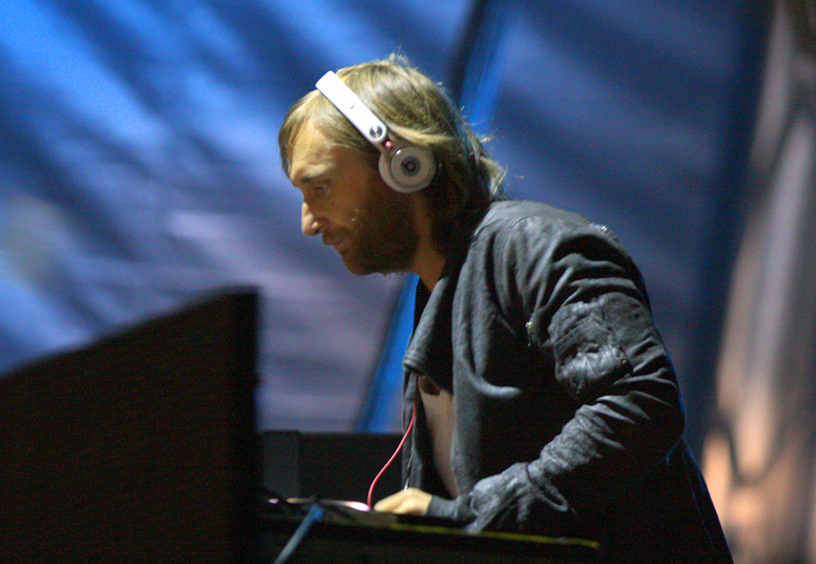
David Guetta

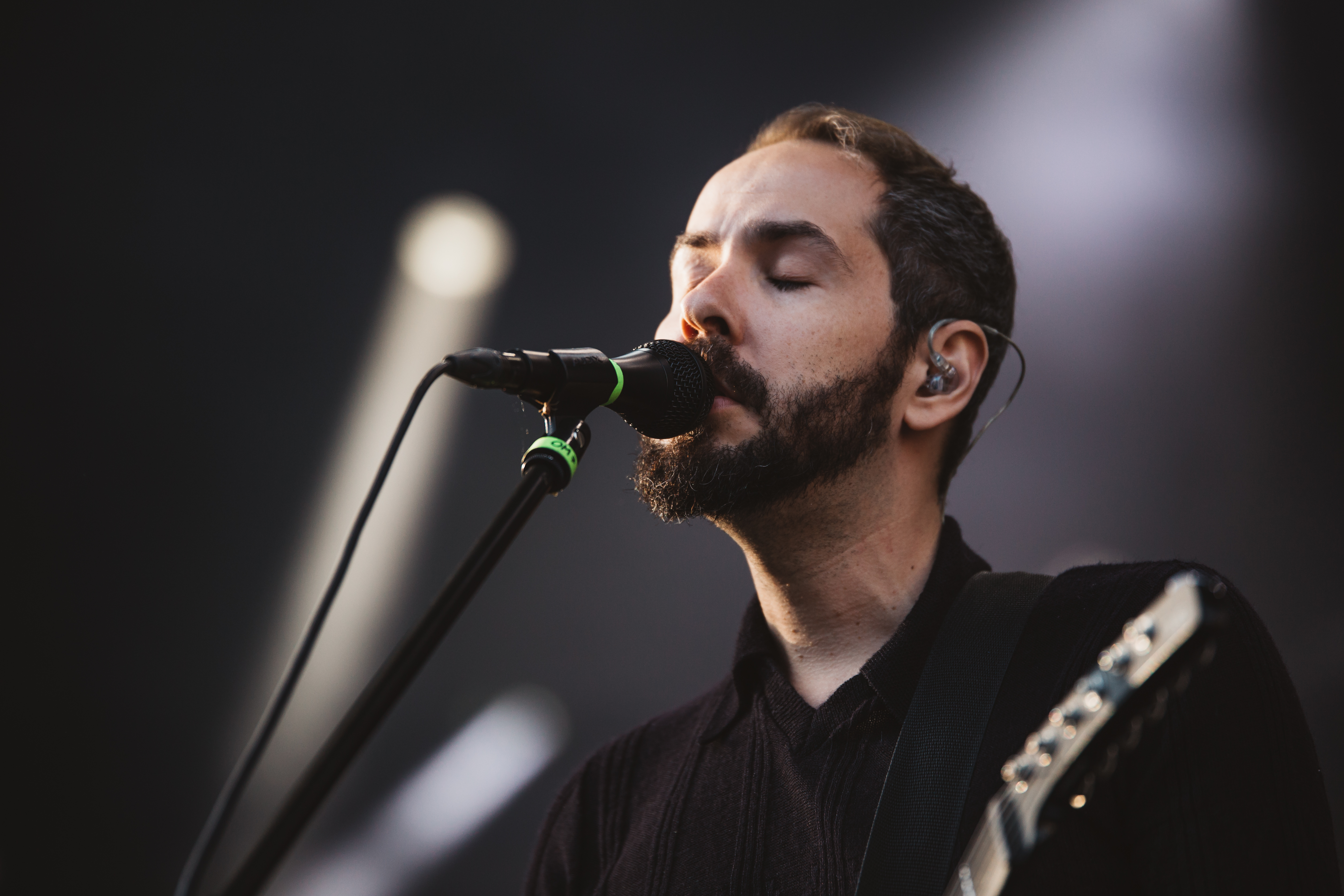
Cigarettes After Sex

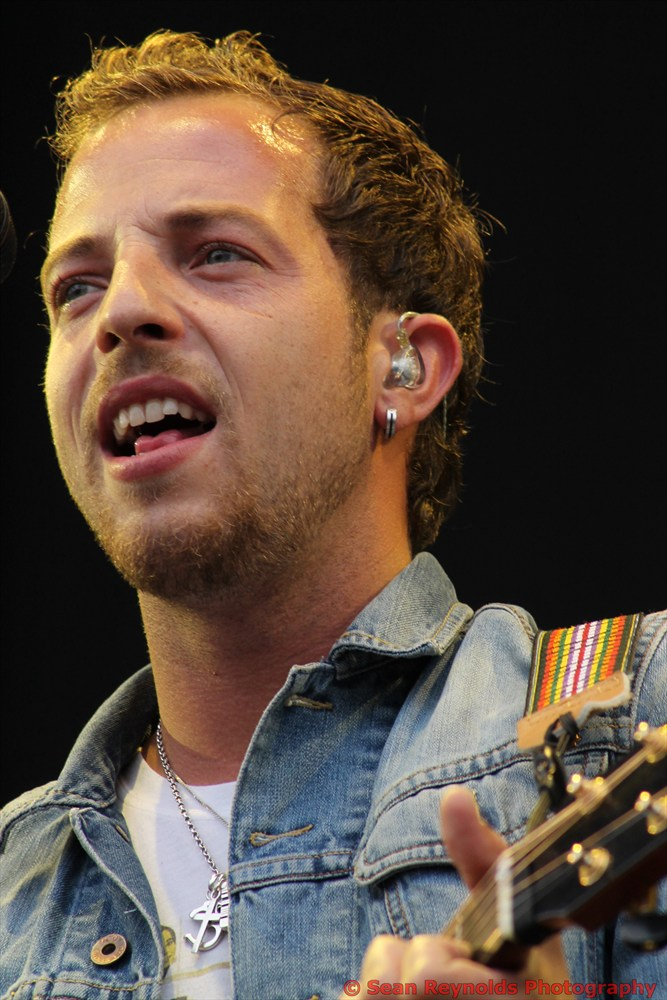
James Morrison

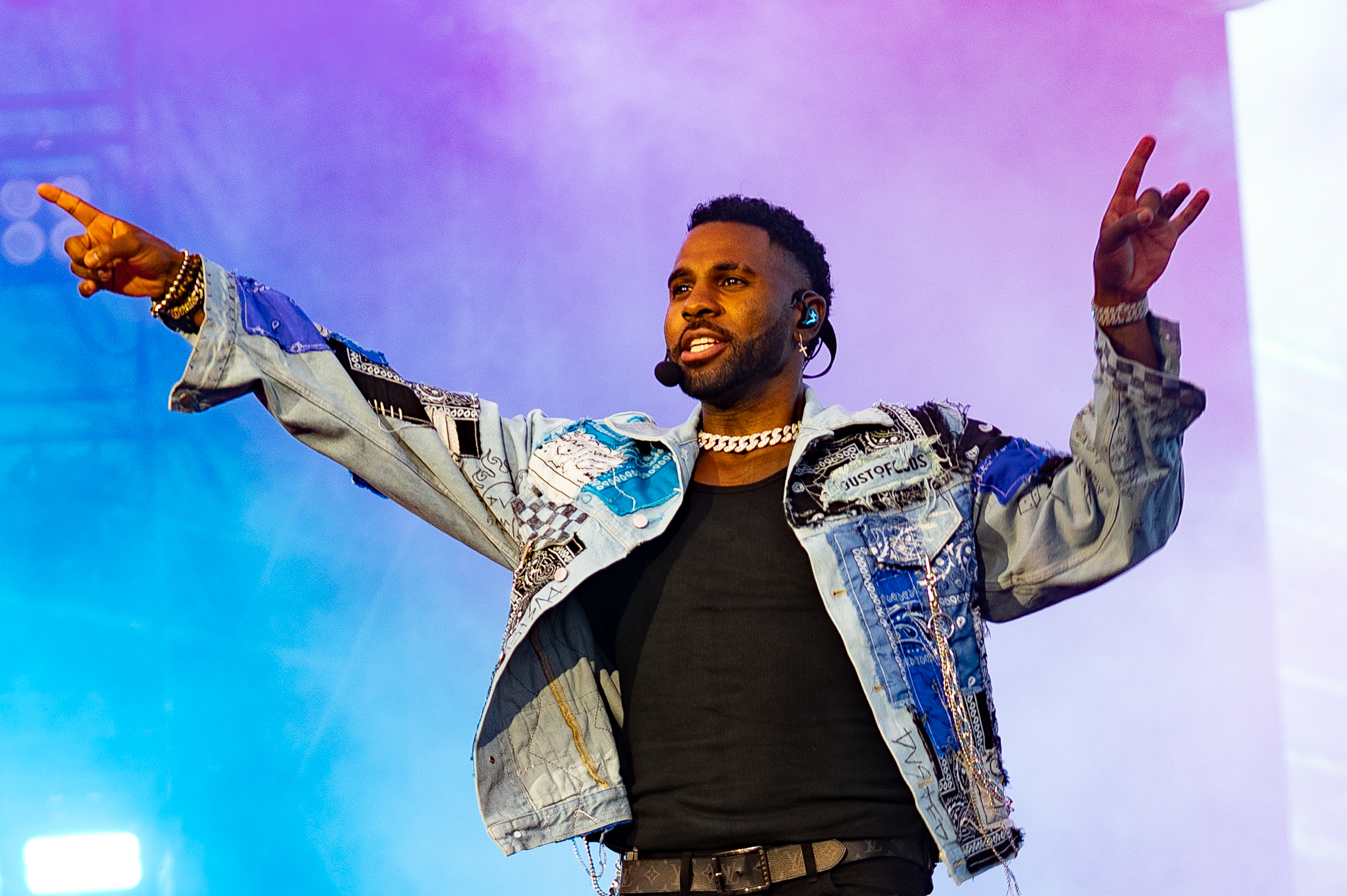
Jason Derulo

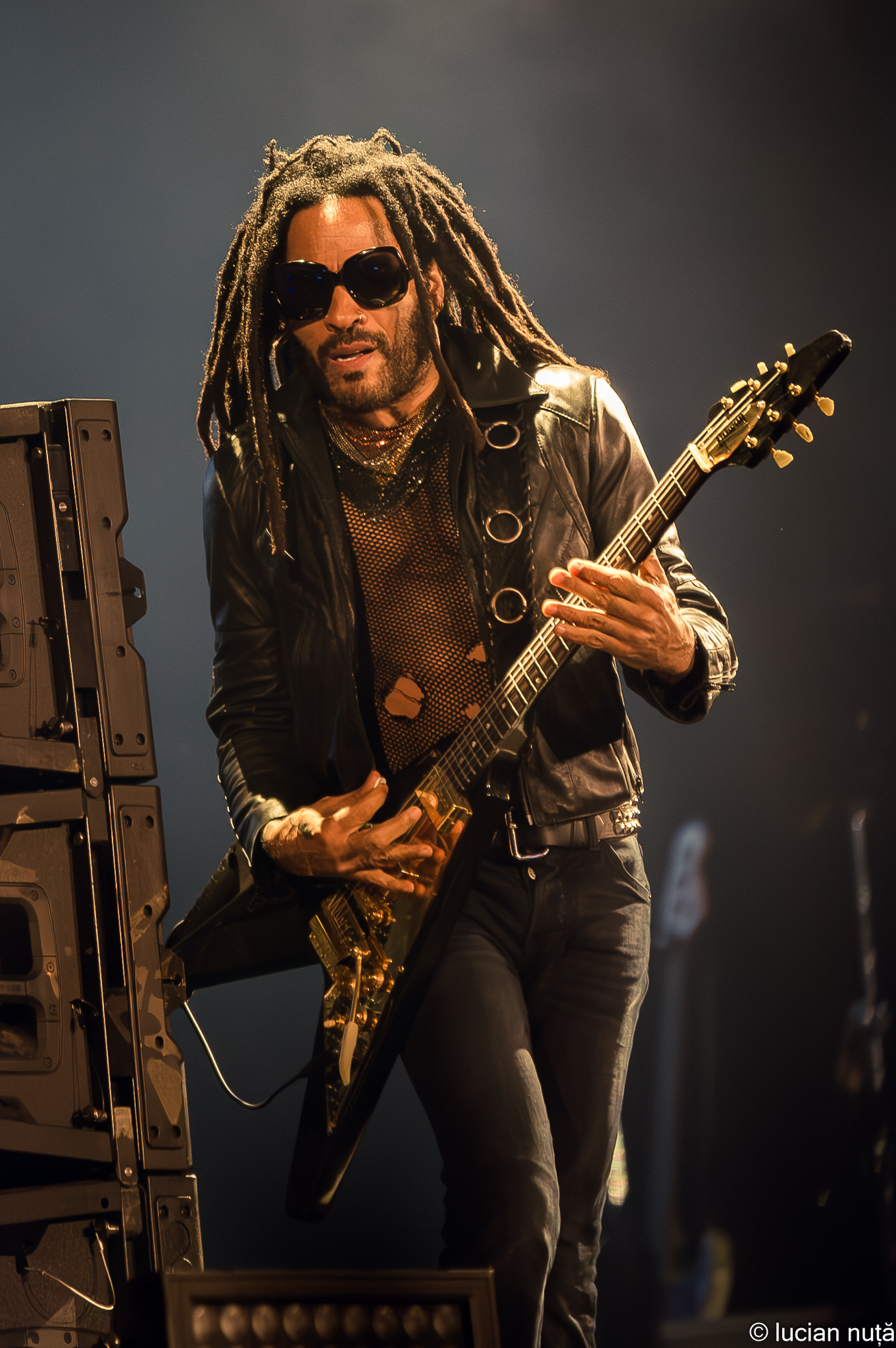
Lenny Kravitz

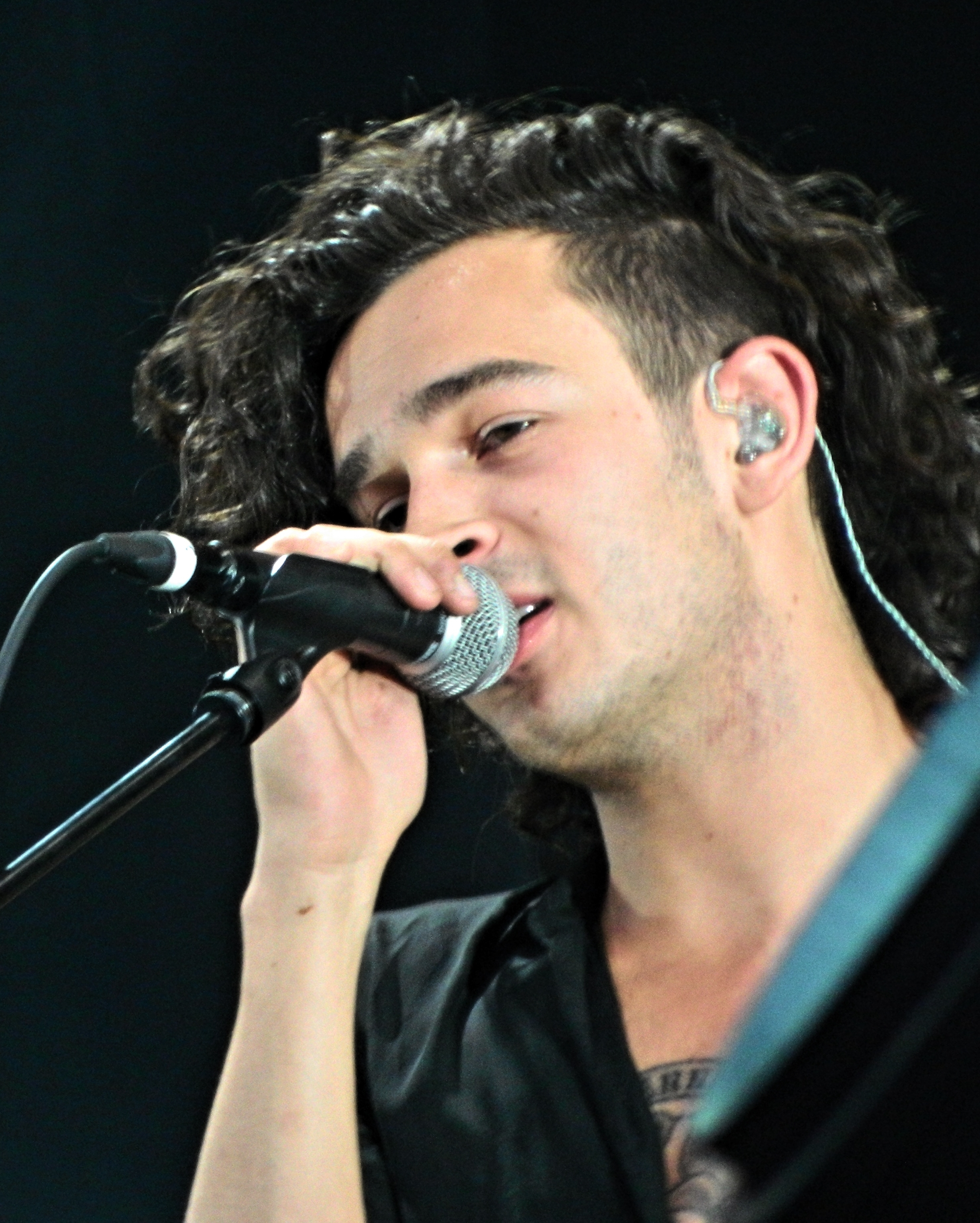
Matty Healy

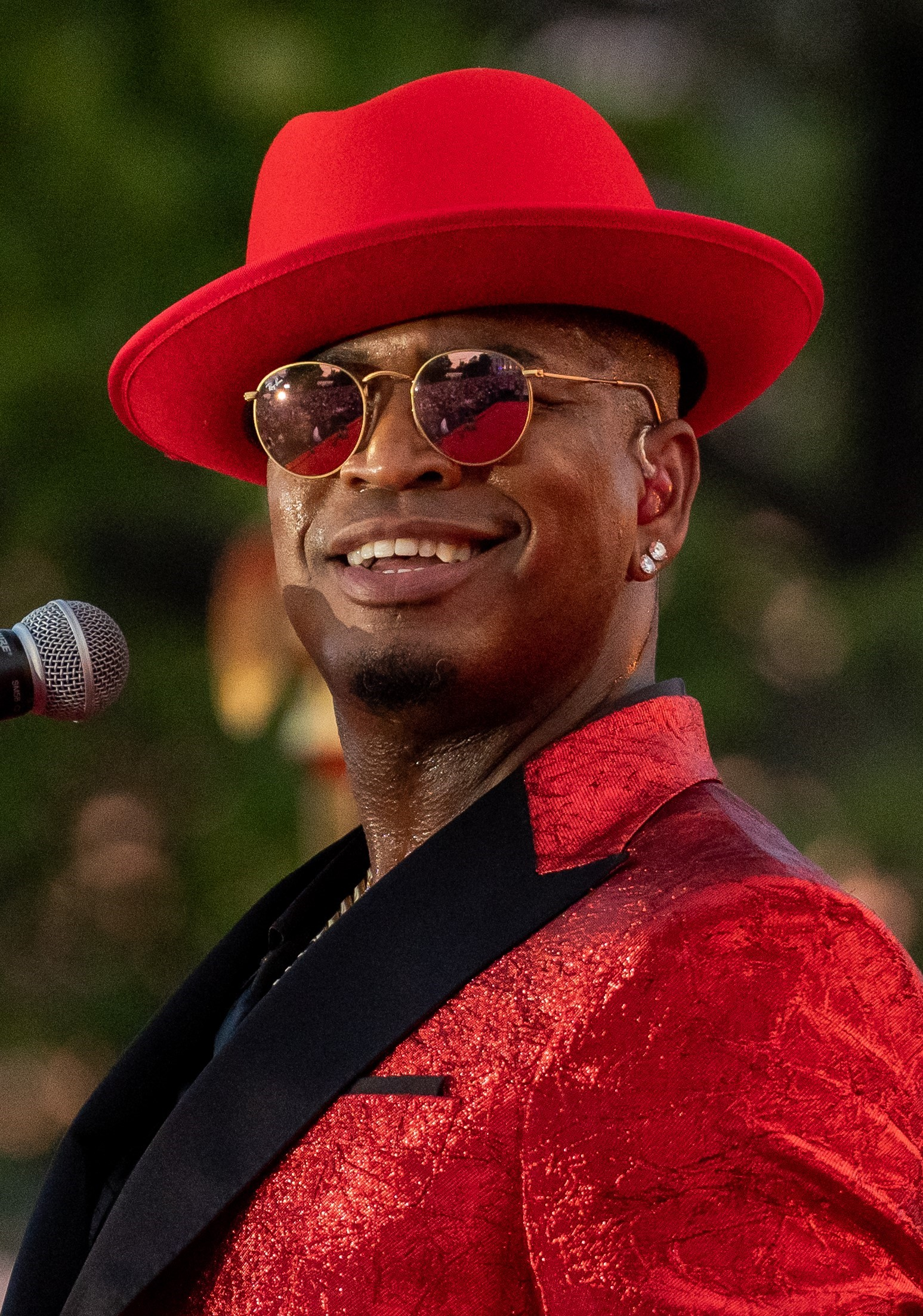
Ne-Yo

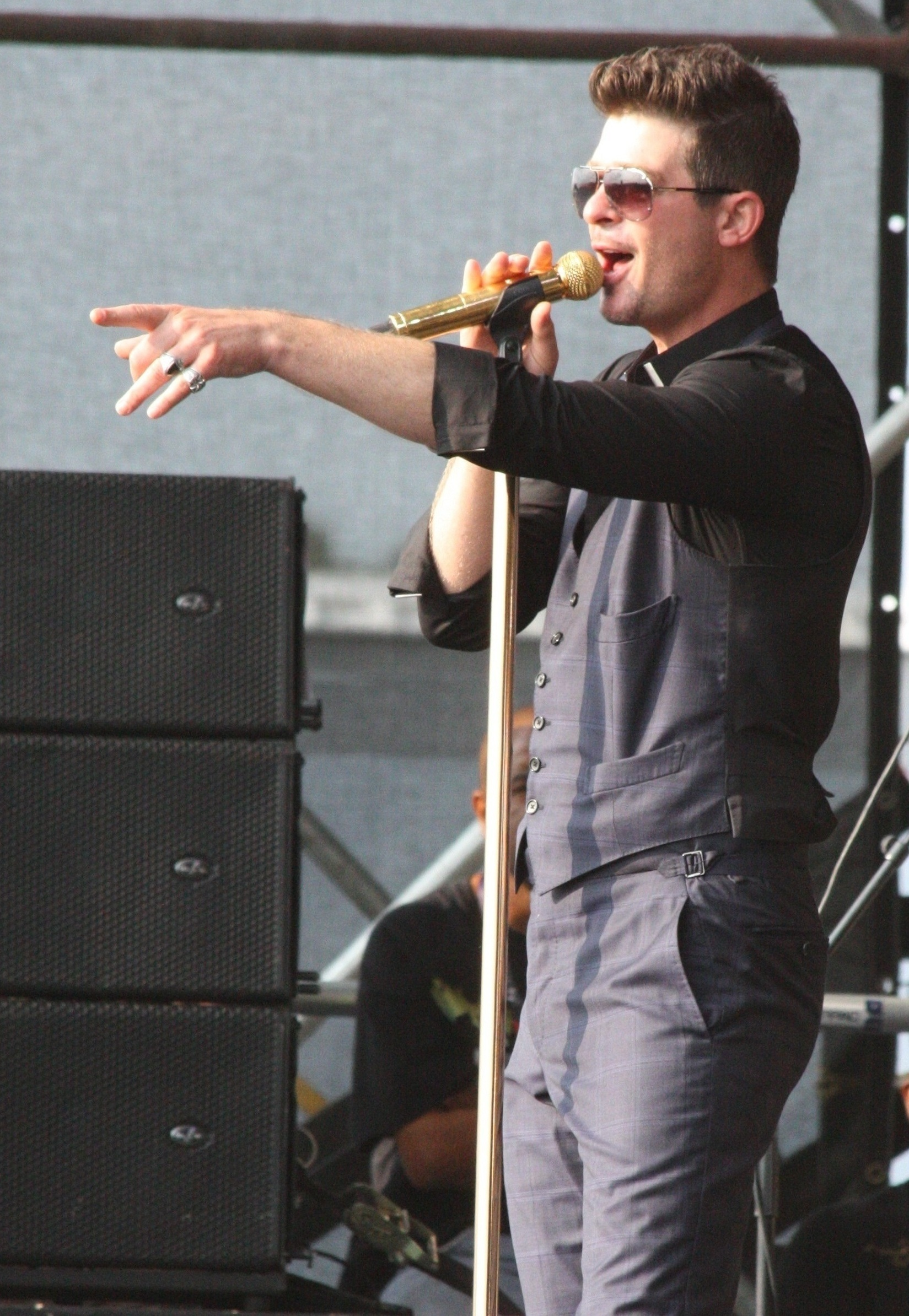
Robin Thicke

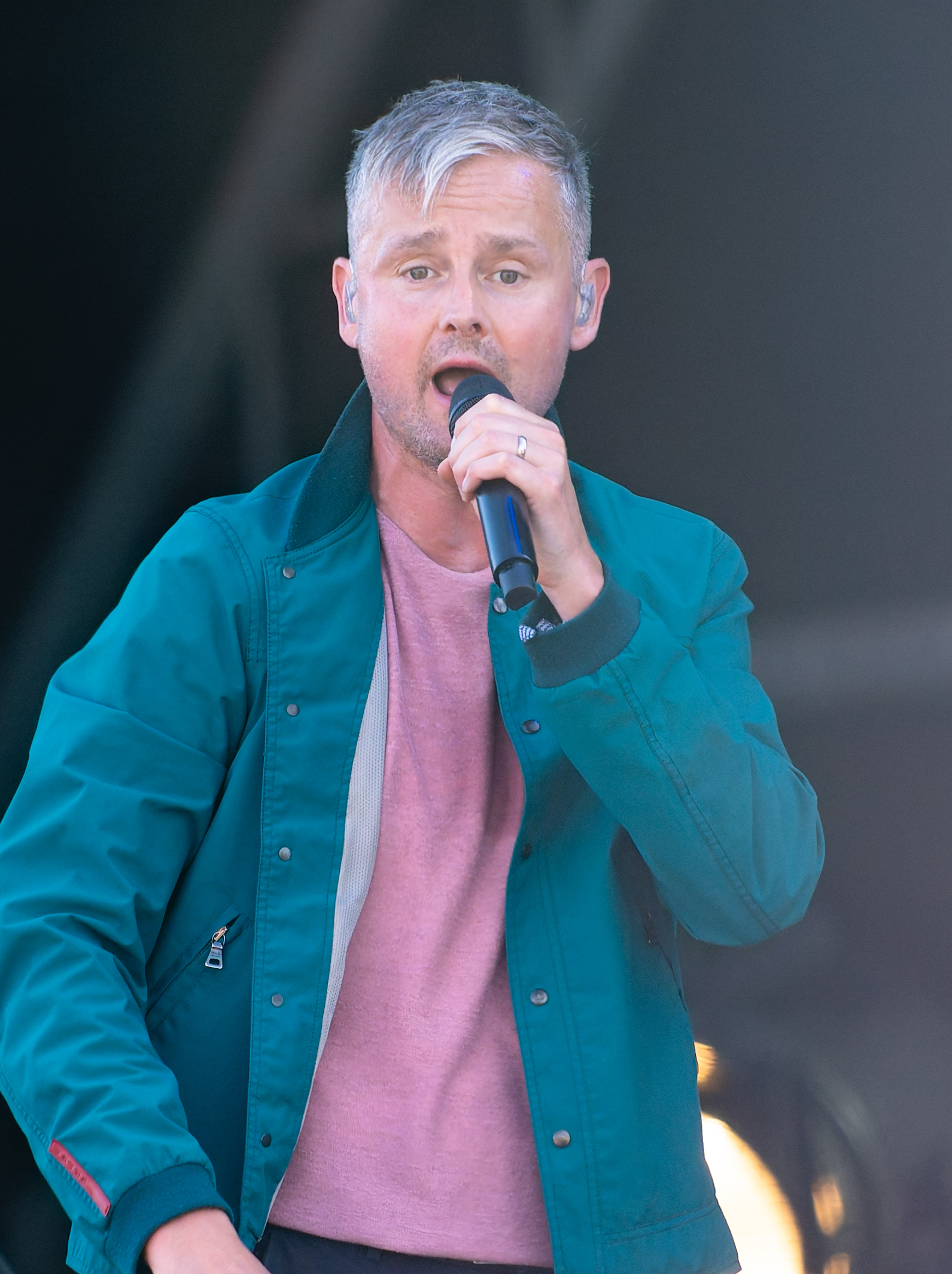
Tom Chaplin

- Beyoncé went to see Jackson in concert for the first time at age 5 and claims to have realized her sole purpose, saying "If it wasn't for Michael Jackson, I would never ever have performed."
- Celine Dion, who had posters of Jackson in her bedroom growing up, cited Jackson as a major motivation for her to learn English and fueled her desire to want to be a megastar.
- Chris Brown has claimed Michael Jackson as his biggest inspiration of all time, stating "Michael Jackson is the reason why I do music and the reason I am an entertainer [...] Being able to see Michael Jackson's success, to be able to inspire the world as well as his talent and musical ability, his eye for detail – automatically inspires me to try to be better and try to be great."
- Chris Martin of Coldplay has said Jackson was his early introduction to music through Bad and Off the Wall album, and dedicated a letter in Martins' handwriting on Coldplay's official website, "Michael Jackson was the best of the best. His music and performances made the world a brighter place. His light will shine on forever."
- Ciara explained, "Whenever someone asks me who inspires me to do what I do, I always say Michael. That's it for me. He's everything to me [...] I feel it's important for me to continue to let my generation know how important he was to music."
- Dave Keuning, lead guitarist of The Killers, says listening to "Thriller" made him love music and inspired him to become a musician. David Guetta's beginning in audio mixing was a "beat mash paying homage to Michael Jackson's "Billie Jean". Guetta names him as a primary influence. He voiced regret they had not collaborated before his passing, after his Jackson-inspired 2014 single "Bad" went number one in several countries.
- Eddie Vedder from Pearl Jam has said that listening to Jackson's music got him into singing "And my parents became the new foster parents for seven kids in this group home. They were mostly African-American kids and some Irish kids. [...] I started singing to Michael Jackson records." Eddie also notes that his first album was "Got to Be There".
- Greg Gonzalez of Cigarettes After Sex credits Jackson as his primary influence to become a musician, "Yeah for me I started young, I think I was born the year that Thriller came out and pretty much Michael Jackson became like this immediate idol, and I wanted to be a performer; just sing and perform and just seeing everything that he was doing."
- Icona Pop's initial track that made them want to make music was Black or White by Michael Jackson. "I think it was because it's such a powerful pop song. Even though I was really young when I first heard it, I really felt what it was all about. I guess at even such an early age I knew that I wanted to be making music and I can thank Michael Jackson for that."
- Iron & Wine's earliest impression of music was with his friend to "Beat It", saying "I still remember, to this day sitting on his couch" narrating their amazed reaction listening on a cassette tape.
- James Morrison explained "I was four or five and I used to watch Moonwalker every day, there was a clip of him singing "Man in the Mirror" at a concert where everyone's lighters are out and that was a massive moment in my life. Something clicked in my head, which was 'I want to do that, I want to sing.' [...] Michael Jackson was my first love singing wise."
- Janet Jackson, his sister, says he inspired her in many ways and helped her perform, recalling
  Michael and I would tape every old musical, and we made a collage. All the dance numbers, we put them all on one tape and we used to just watch them and watch them. He was Fred Astaire, i was Ginger Rogers, and we'd learn every routine. Our mirror was the reflection off the window [...] Seeing all the things that he's accomplished, and saying okay I've got to keep growing, I've got to keep pushing forward, move on, on and upward. [...] And I think he's the greatest there is.
- Jason Derulo states, "He is the reason I am who I am today. When I was four years old, I saw him for the first time. I saw how he moved the crowd and how people were just so touched."
- Jeremiah Green of Modest Mouse, said that he was a big fan of Jackson musically. When he was asked what he wanted to be as a grown up, he responded, "Well, duh, dude, I might be Michael Jackson".
- Kevin Parker of psychedelic super project Tame Impala has said of one of his earliest introductions to music,
  My brother Steve, who was a few years older than me, had Bad on tape and I remember listening to Smooth Criminal and just thinking it was the coolest thing ever. I must have been five or six at the time and I remember walking around school by myself thinking I was Michael Jackson. I wasn't dancing, exactly – more like walking musically. It seemed like a good idea at the time.
  Additionally, he says, "Michael Jackson's one of my favorite artists of my whole life [...] In fact, I think he is my favorite."
- Lenny Kravitz, "Michael Jackson, just because he was the first thing that made me want to play music. The Jackson 5 was monumental to me — in my development, in my music, in my childhood, in my adult life." He mentions seeing him in concert, "It was magical. He was six or seven years old. It was crazy. I had a picture in my bedroom that my father took of them that night on stage. It was my earliest memory of what changed my life."
- Matty Healy, frontman of The 1975, cites Jackson as his earliest musical influence, "Michael Jackson [...] The first gig I went to was Michael Jackson at Wembley when I was six. It was the HIStory tour. Watching him catalysed a real drive in me. He was such a phenomenal performer."
- Ne-Yo said in 2008, "Michael Jackson is one of the reasons why I sing." Additionally, on 2019 Larry King Live and 2024, "Without Michael Jackson, there would be no Ne-Yo." Particularly for his Libra Scale album, he referenced Jackson's need for quality was a motivation to make his music better.
- Pat Monahan from Train described that he left his basketball career behind after listening to Jackson's music in a carpool ride back home. He claims the whole car including himself was singing to a song by Jackson, until the others in the car turned to him in shock from his vocal quality. He also named Off the Wall as one of five albums he couldn't live without.
- Robin Thicke, "Michael's music was one of the first things that made me want to become an artist. When I was on the school bus at seven or eight years old I would sing Michael songs to get attention. It was one of the first times I knew that I wanted to be an artist."
- Tom Chaplin of Keane says, "[Bad] was the first album that had a huge impact, and kick-started feelings of making music myself."
- Troye Sivan credits Jackson for making performing his dream career, after seeing footage of the Bad tour on VHS tape.
- Usher has on many occasions named Jackson as his biggest influence, "I wouldn't be who I am today without Michael Jackson. [...] You can't say you are an artist in this century and wasn't inspired by Michael ... and I'm always gonna remember. I'll be a fan for life." They performed together at the Michael Jackson: 30th Anniversary Special for "You Rock My World".
- Victoria Monét was asked what made her want to be a musician, said,
  It was after watching a Michael Jackson concert on tape when I was around six or seven. He had a certain magic about him, seeing how many people were having a great time in the crowd, it was like they had no worries, they were just so overjoyed to be celebrating together in the one space. To child-me, it looked like there were millions of people in the audience, and they were so emotional – people bursting into tears, or passing out – the passion he exuded in every move. [...] So I was like, 'I wanna do that!'.
- The Weeknd referenced Michael Jackson in a Complex magazine article, he says "He's everything to me, so you're going to hear it in my music. Off the Wall was the album that inspired me to sing." Tesfaye covered "Dirty Diana" re-titled "D.D." on his third mixtape Echoes of Silence. The Weeknd also cites Jackson's falsetto on Don't Stop 'til You Get Enough helped him train his own falsetto.

=== Specific creative methods ===
Various musicians have referenced Michael Jackson for specific creative methods.

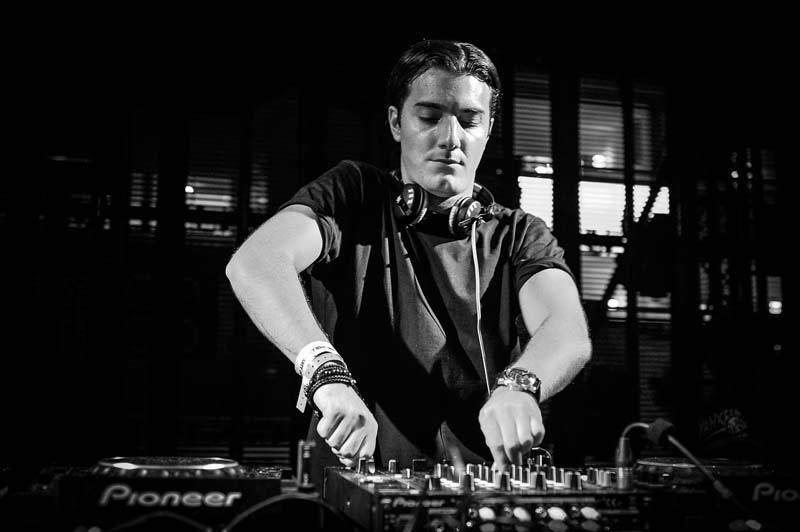
Alesso

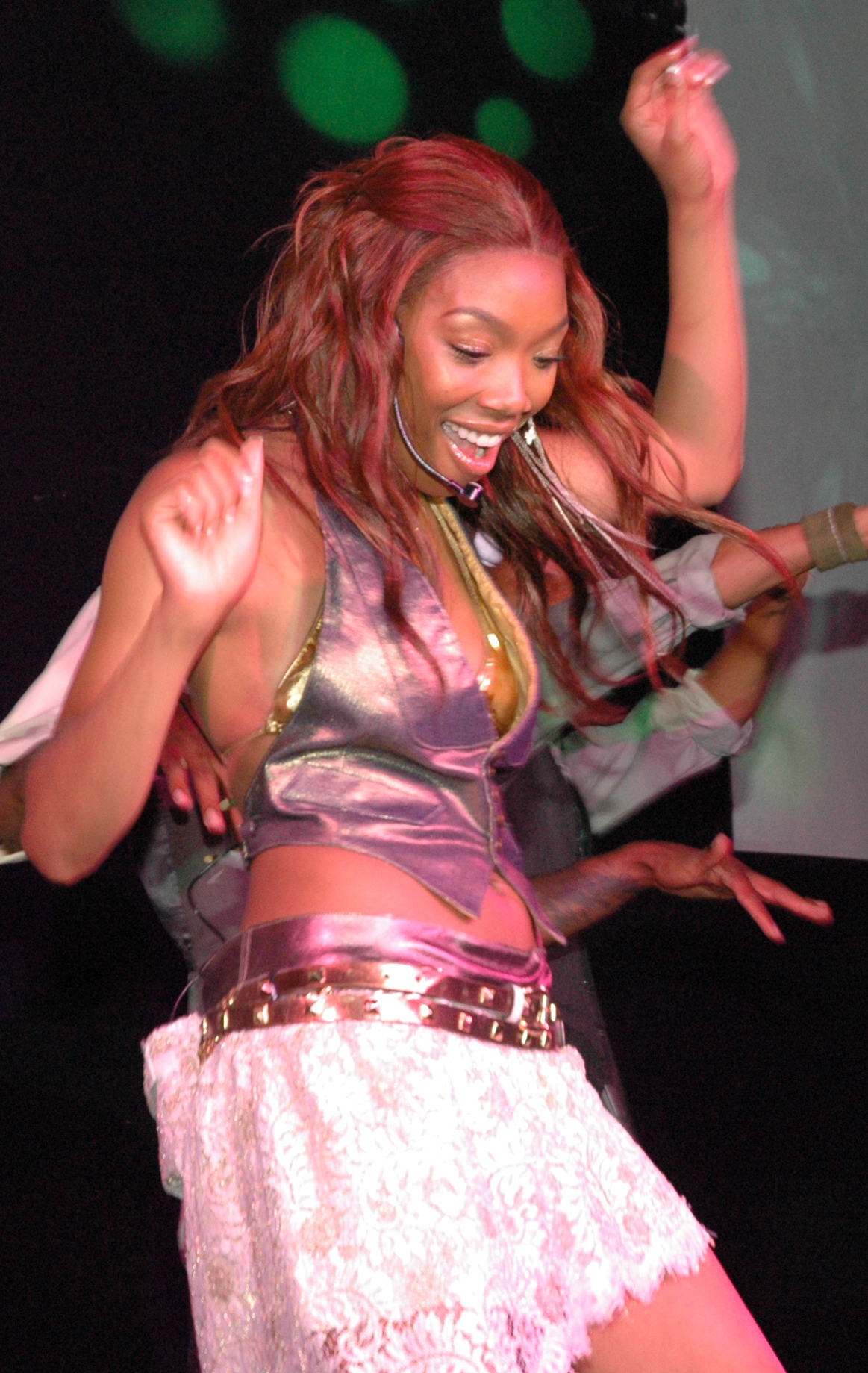
Brandy Norwood

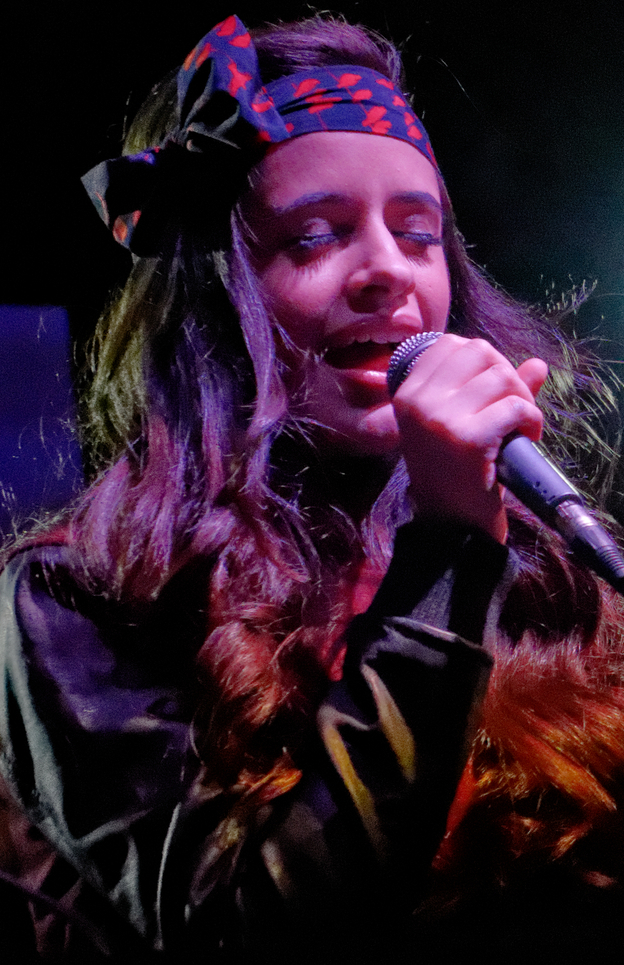
Camila Cabello

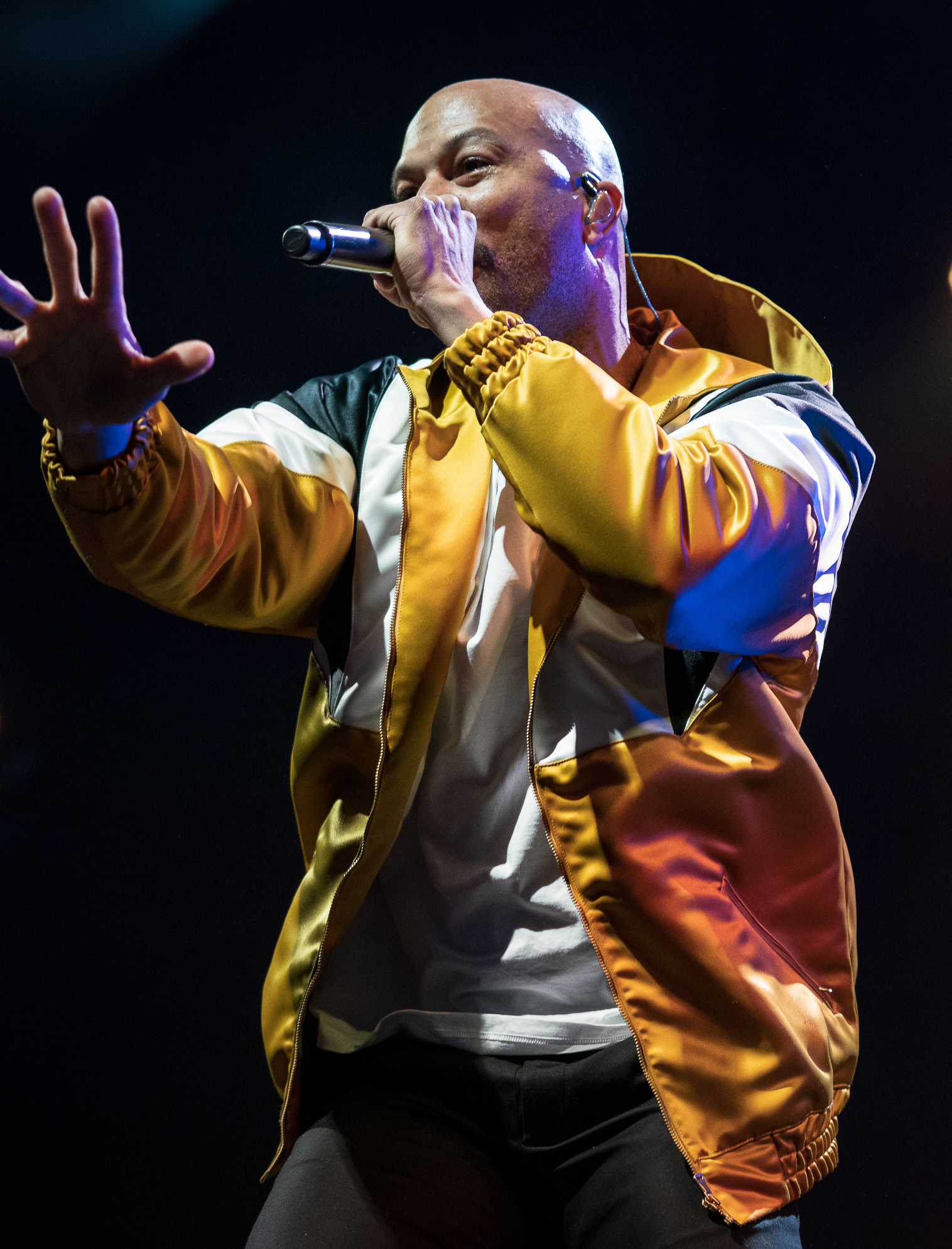
Common

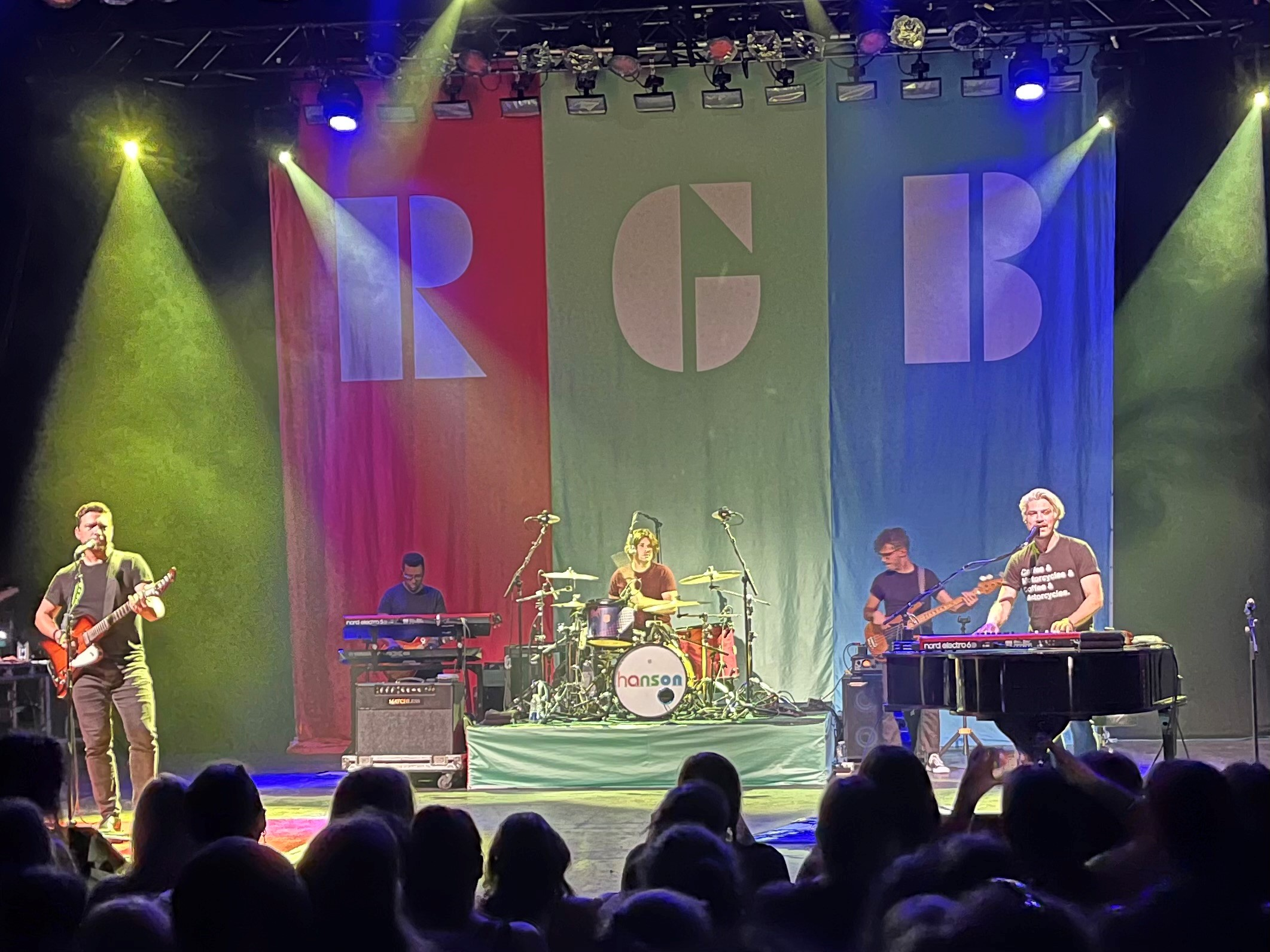
Hanson

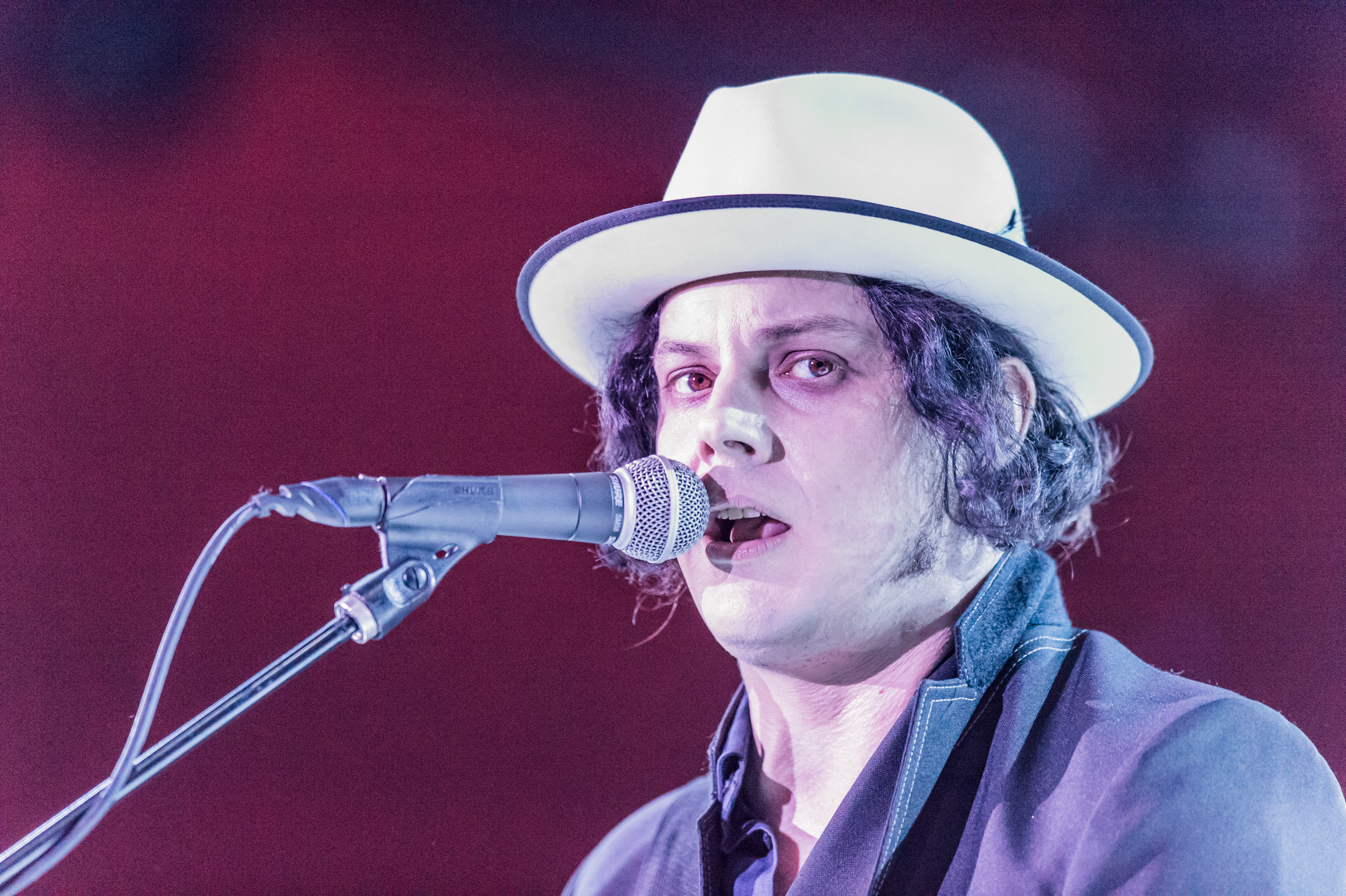
Jack White

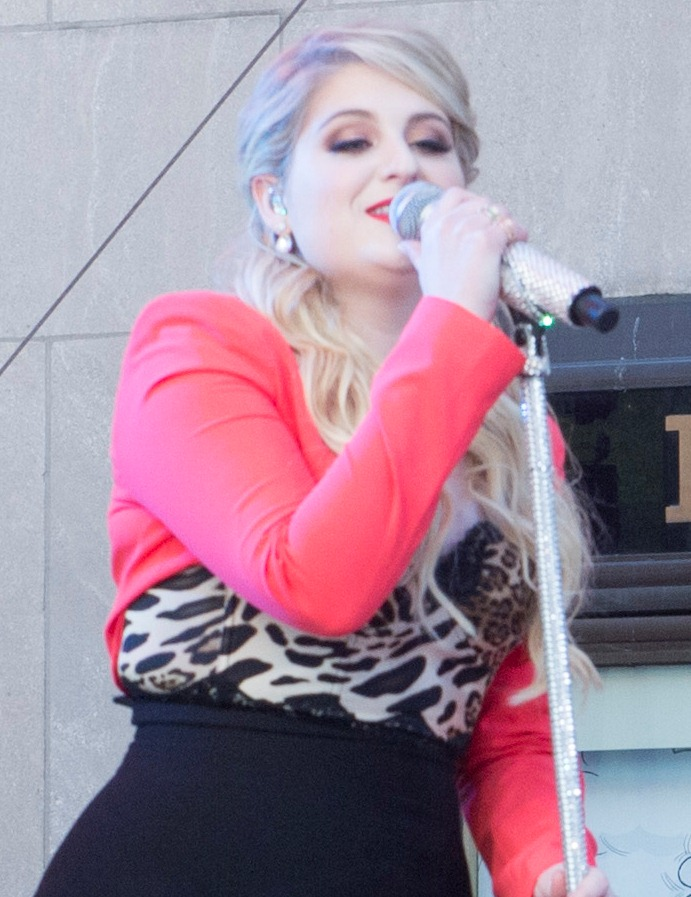
Meghan Trainor

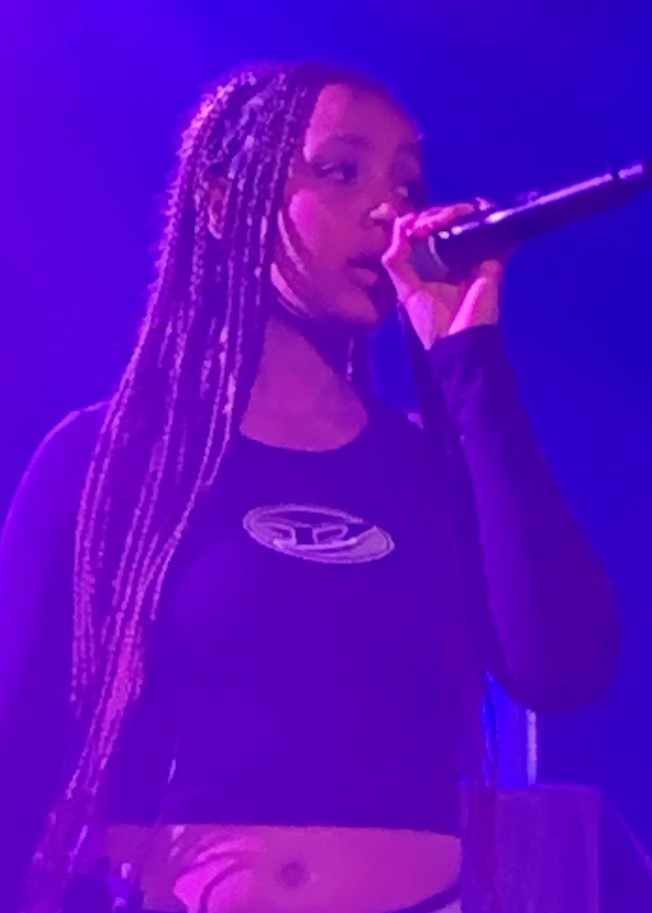
PinkPantheress

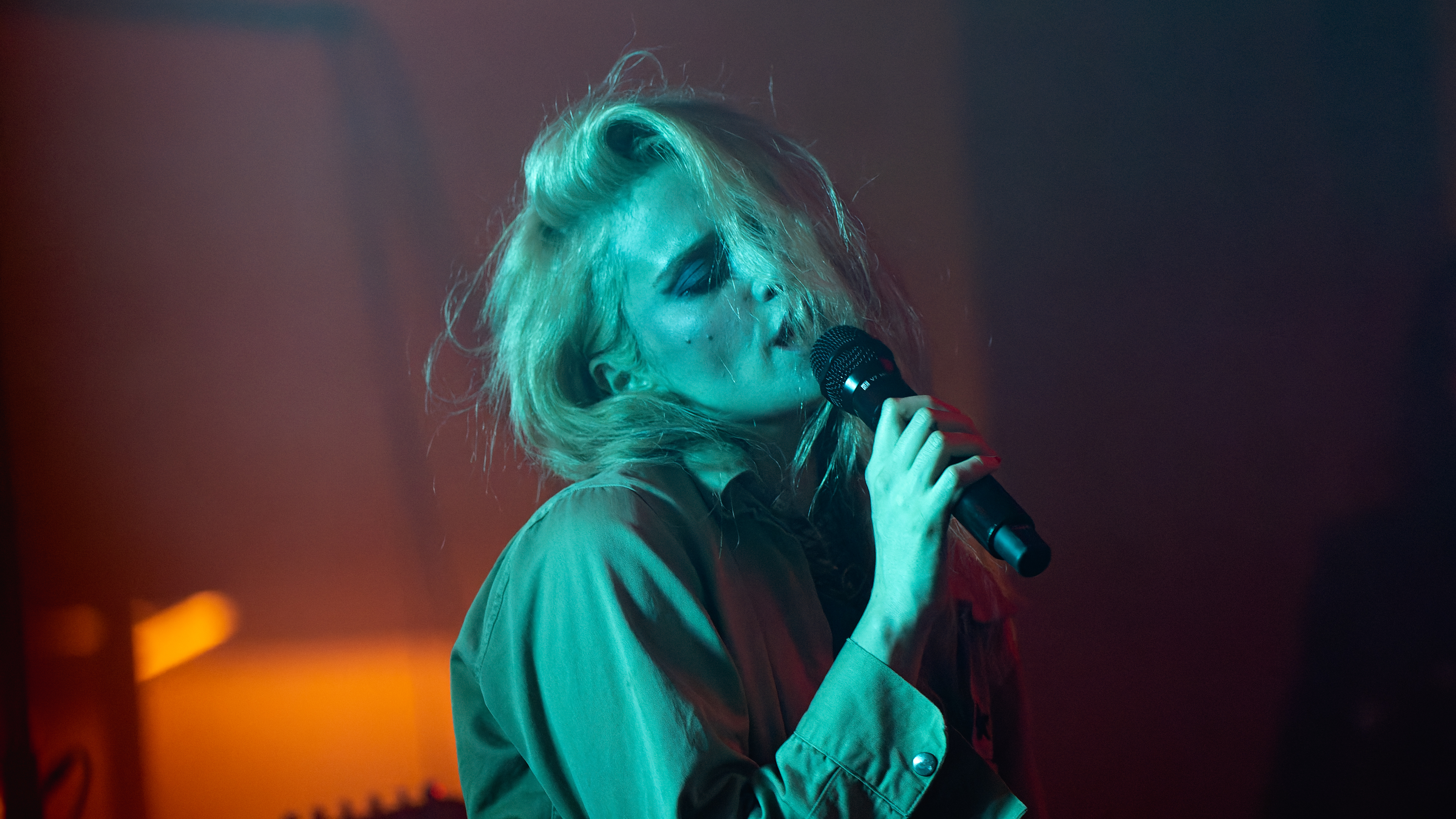
Sky Ferreira

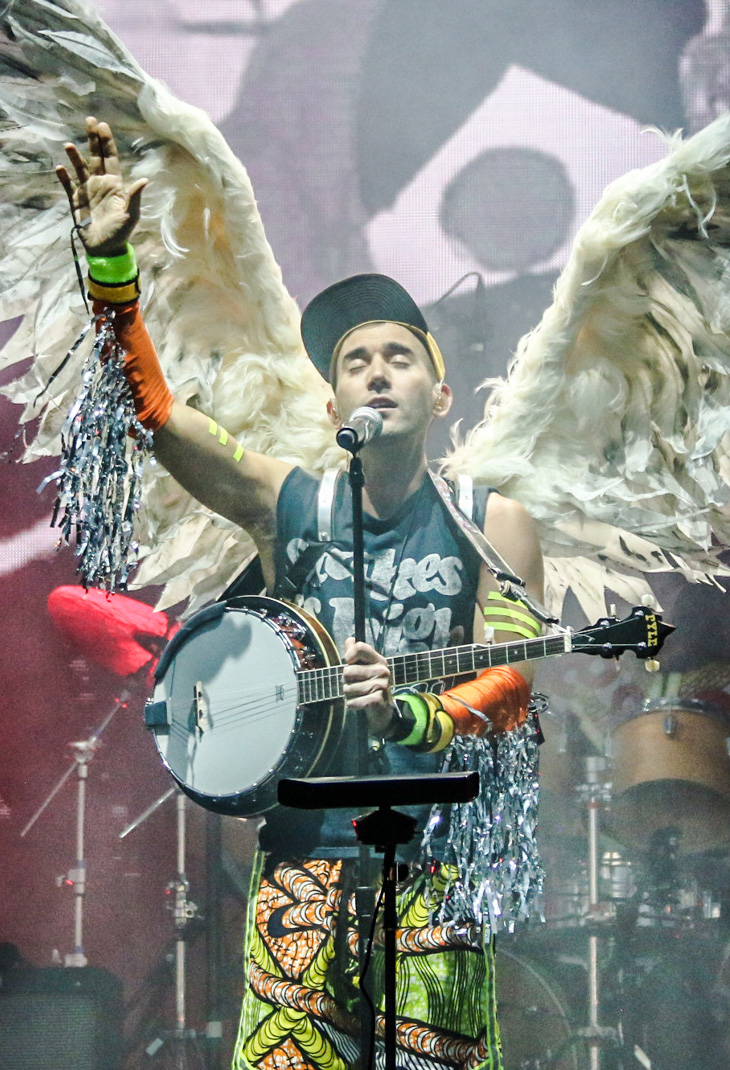
Sufjan Stevens

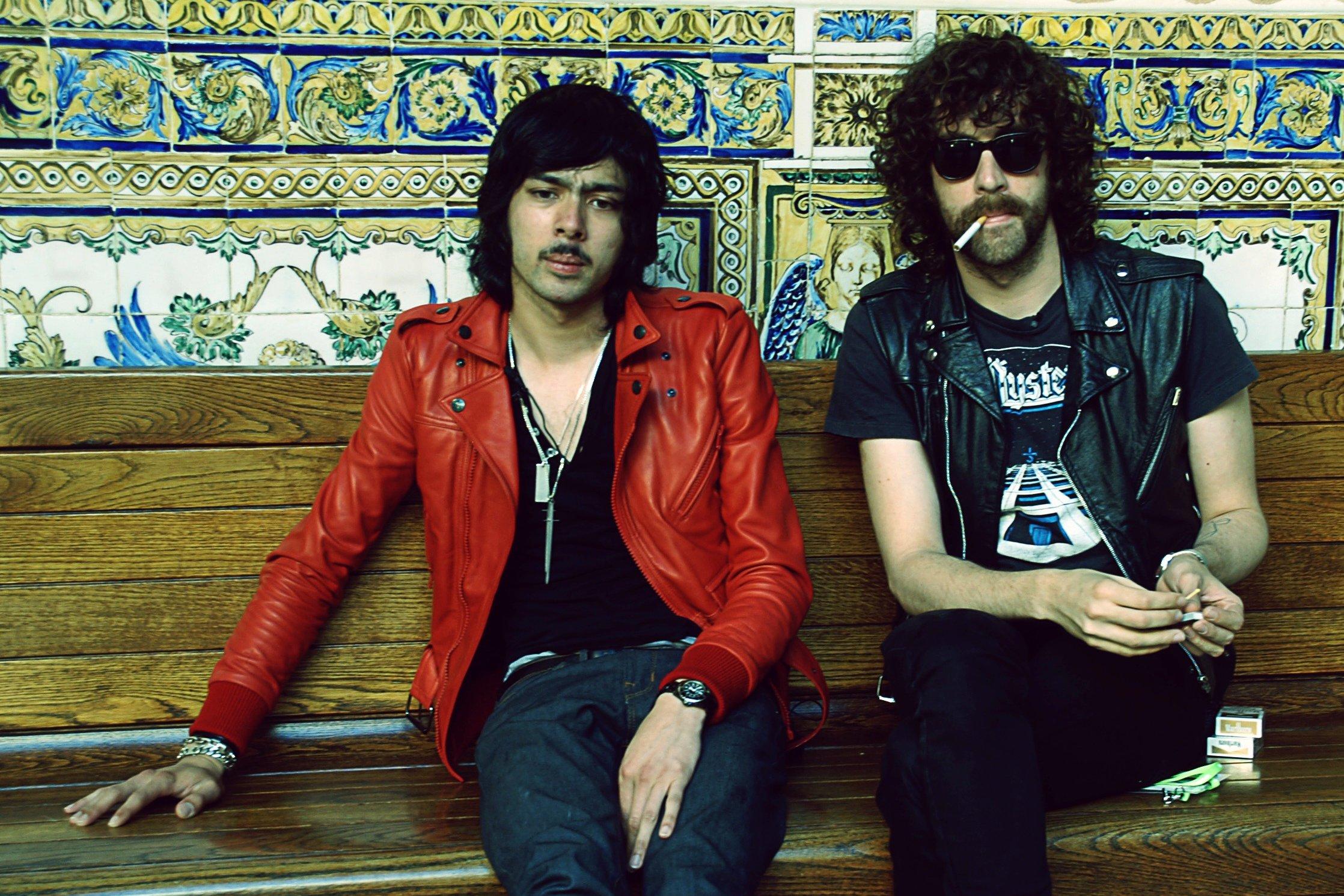
Xavier de Rosnay (left)

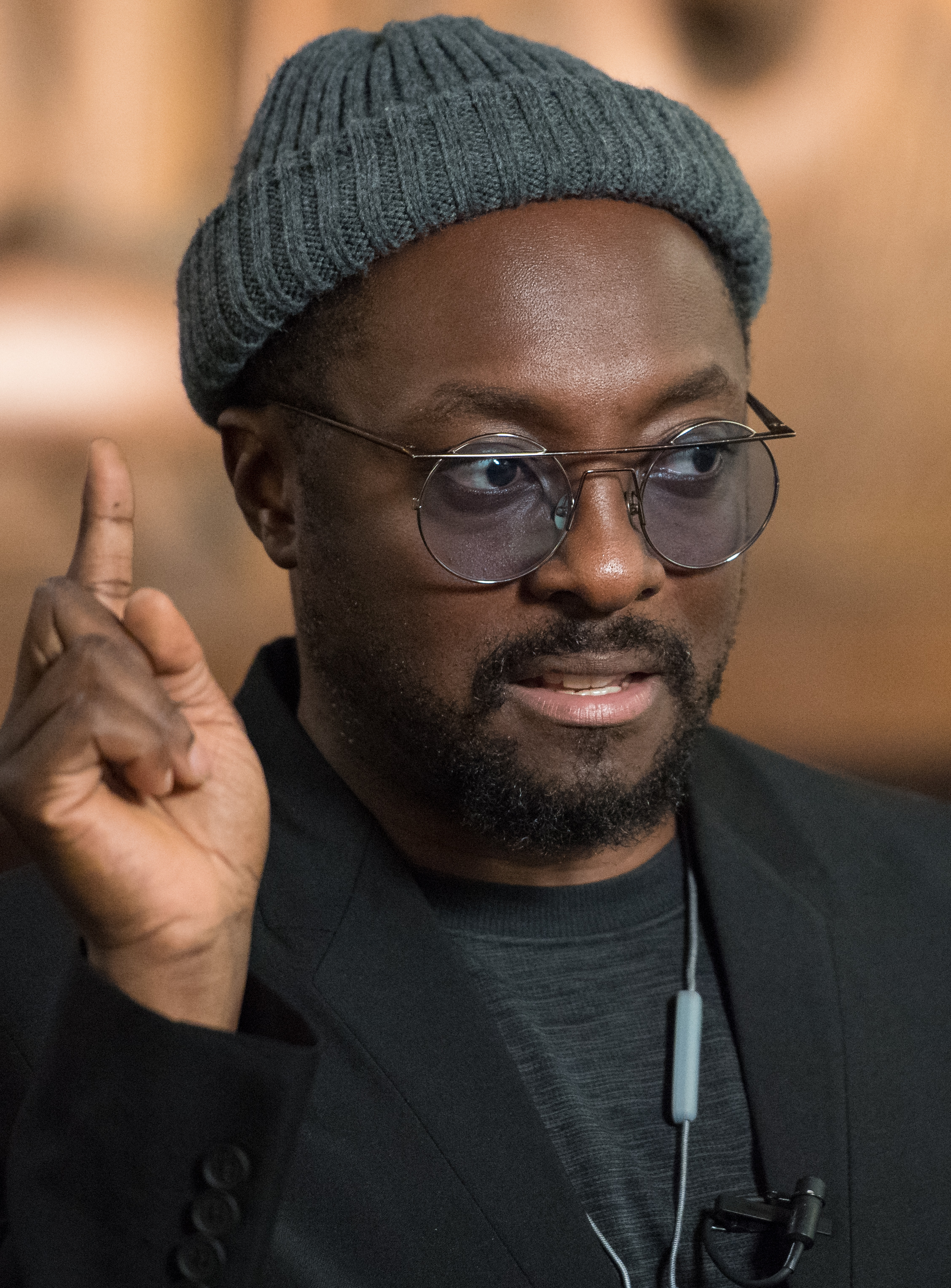
will.i.am

- Alesso described to DJ Mag that disc jockeys must constantly reinvent their music but it should still sound like them. So, he harnessed Jackson who is creatively his biggest influence, "Always evolving, always coming up with new ideas but still managed to stay himself the whole time".
- Brandy, who admires Jackson, has influenced her to stack vocals in an unconventional way for Full Moon.
- Camila Cabello credits Michael with inspiring the content of her debut album, Camila. She also explains the music video for "Thriller" inspired her to make an extended version of "Havana".
- Charlie Puth's virtual music class on sound reproduction uses Quincy Jones and Michael Jackson's vocal recording trick as a focused case study on 2-note phrasing (also tie notes) using Pro Tools.
- Clean Bandit's Jack says of him and Grace's emphasis to focus on their music videos was from Jackson, "I used to watch so much MTV 2 and VH1 Classics when I was like 15 or 14. I guess the first music video I had was the Michael Jackson Greatest Hits on VHS [...] I completely wore out that tape. Since I started working with Grace [...] we realised that she had worn out the same tape. I think Michael Jackson music videos are the pinnacle of that medium."
- Common has said watching Jackson on Motown 25 stuck with him as a performer for his energy, "I can see it now. I remember where I was; a friend videotaped it and I rewound it and watched it so many times. It was one of those moments where it was out of body in a way, because his energy was so incredible. [...] It became part of the breakdance culture at some point, too." He highlights this move motivated him to use energetic movements when he's on stage.
- Hanson, the group popular for "MMMBop", implement the term "apply the "Michael Jackson theory" during their production process to emphasize their songs must have the standard of "lots of groove and melody".
- Both members of Honne, describes that Michael Jackson is a main influence to their music, "For me, growing up I loved Michael Jackson." They borrowed 80s style drum and snare elements, like the Simmons snare that Michael Jackson used.
- Imogen Heap appeared on Thrillercast podcast in 2008, to talk in depth about Jackson's methodology,
  As a singer, the way that you would breathe, people kind of dip down their breaths, when it comes down to their vocal take, I love the way he incorporates it. The breaths are just as important as the vocal melody. [...] Michael Jackson's collection of words that don't exist in the English language or perhaps any language apart from Michael Jackson's own special dictionary. Words like shamone, I have no idea what shamone means but what's great about that is it leaves a door wide open for people like myself to also make up entirely nonsensical words and create even whole songs about them!
- Jack White of The White Stripes has praised him numerous times, "["Let God in the room"] [...] I saw Michael Jackson say that once. I thought, Wow, I've been saying that to myself for a long time, and I was glad to hear him say that. The ultimate thing to do is to relinquish all control." "And I want to write like Michael Jackson would write—instead of writing parts on the instruments or humming melodies, you think of them. To do everything in my head and to do it in silence and use only one room." He copied Jackson's melody-before-lyrics approach specifically for Boarding House Reach.
- James Bay mentioned as a child he was obsessed with Michael Jackson, attributing his trademark wide-brimmed hat was inspired by the image of Jackson's single silvery glove.
- Junior Senior's "Move Your Feet" was a song often mistaken for Jackson's voice. Junior Senior said in a 2005 The Reykjavík Grapevine interview that this wasn't the listener's imagination, it was intentional.
- Meghan Trainor listed Jackson amongst four other entertainers who inspired her,
  Just how much he was involved with every music video, every photo shoot, every production. I didn't know any of that. I've been watching recently because I'm like, 'Am I doing too much stuff?' I'm involved in every little thing you see (in my career). I looked it up because I was like, 'Am I alone?' and I was like, 'No, that's what Michael did. You're doing the right thing.
- Muse's song "Time Is Running Out" was specifically created during a studio session where the band wanted to have a sound similar to "Billie Jean".
- The Newton Brothers infused retro music of Radiohead and Michael Jackson for their composition work in the X-Men '97 soundtrack.
- Maxwell covered "The Lady in My Life" at the 2022 Billboard Music Awards. He said ever since, he wanted to make such songs like Jackson that were used at his friends weddings to walk down the aisle to, just like Lady in My Life.
- Pharrell Williams has expressed admiration for Jackson, having once said "I met Michael at his video shoot in California. I told him from the age of 6 I would burn holes in my socks moonwalking in the bathroom." Williams stated he was motivated to write songs for Jackson, though it would eventually end up on Justin Timberlake's album Justified.
- PinkPantheress created songs on GarageBand in her college dormitory. Influenced by Jackson's music style, she became a viral sensation from her Michael Jackson-remix track "Just A Waste" on TikTok in 2020. It both sampled Off the Wall and lyrically copied Wanna Be Startin' Somethin'. It never officially released due to his estate rejecting authorization but helped her land a record deal with Parlophone four months later.
- Roddy Ricch credits Michael Jackson as inspiration behind his Grammy-nominated song, "The Box," explaining on HBO's The Shop that he saw Jackson do the iconic "EE RR" adlib, "I seen Michael Jackson do it...That's what made me want to do it. Cause he was in the studio one time and he was talking about some song that he made but he started beatboxing and he said he put that in the beat."
- Sky Ferreira's grandmother was Jackson's hair stylist, and she mentions he suggested at age 9 that she join a gospel choir. She was saddened by his passing, and recalls his advice, "He was like, 'Don't focus on things that are just around you – you need to look back to the history of music.' And that's what I did."
- Sufjan Stevens expressed admiration for Michael Jackson in a 2011 interview by stating "I watched the Michael Jackson documentary This Is It [...] just the work that goes into that kind of production and how invested the dancers were and also how hands-on Michael Jackson was. [...] I realized for the first time that all of his music is based on physical ideas. They'd be working through something, and he would explain a musical gesture with his body." Jackson's techniques influenced his tour, The Age of Adz.
- Xavier de Rosnay from Justice says electro hit single D.A.N.C.E was a creative homage to Michael Jackson, "The music of Michael Jackson is something we believe in. So, we built the lyrics mainly around the titles of his songs." P.Y.T., A.B.C., Black or White, Working Day and Night and Whatever Happens are lyrics in the song.
- Composer and rapper Will.i.am for Thriller 40 documentary did a recording session breakdown of the track layering on "Beat It", "It shows the freedom and how comfortable he felt in the studio without worrying about people's judgement or like 'What's that' cause you know he was bringing freaking skill. You knew he was bringing ultra talent, and imagination for him for him to be like 'You know what I feel like yawning right here.'" In another interview, he predicts the future of "perfecting" music, "It's a peek of what's coming [...] In the future, I would bet that tomorrow's Michael Jackson is not a person. It's a machine that will be able to talk to millions of people at the same time. Tomorrow's big superstar will be able to make custom songs Michael Jackson wasn't able to record. Tomorrow's superstar is going to be perfect." He has founded the AI-powered company RAiDiO.FYI that intends to be used for radio consumption.

=== Other major influence ===
Various named him a main or major influence or have known to heavily reference him.

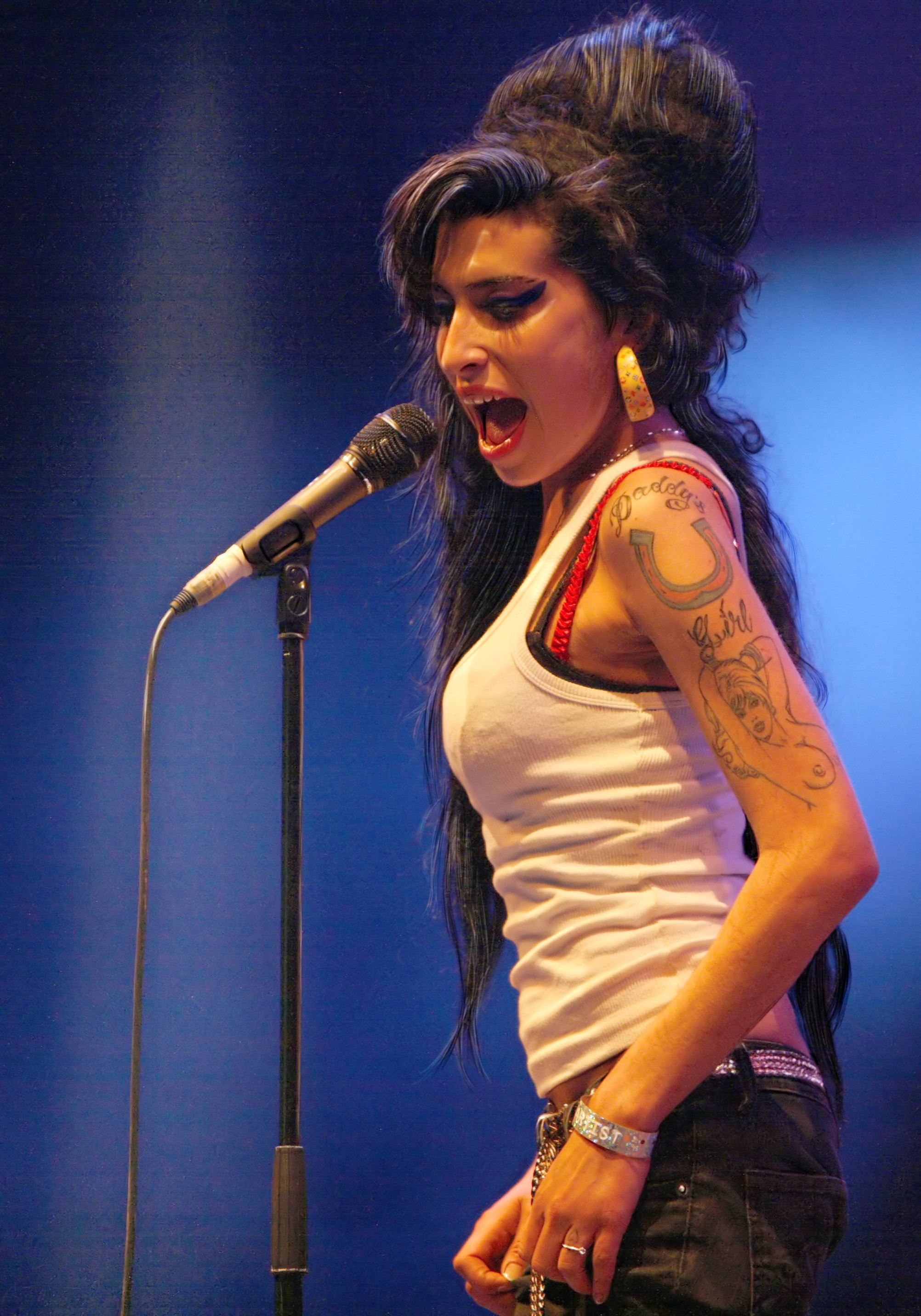
Amy Winehouse

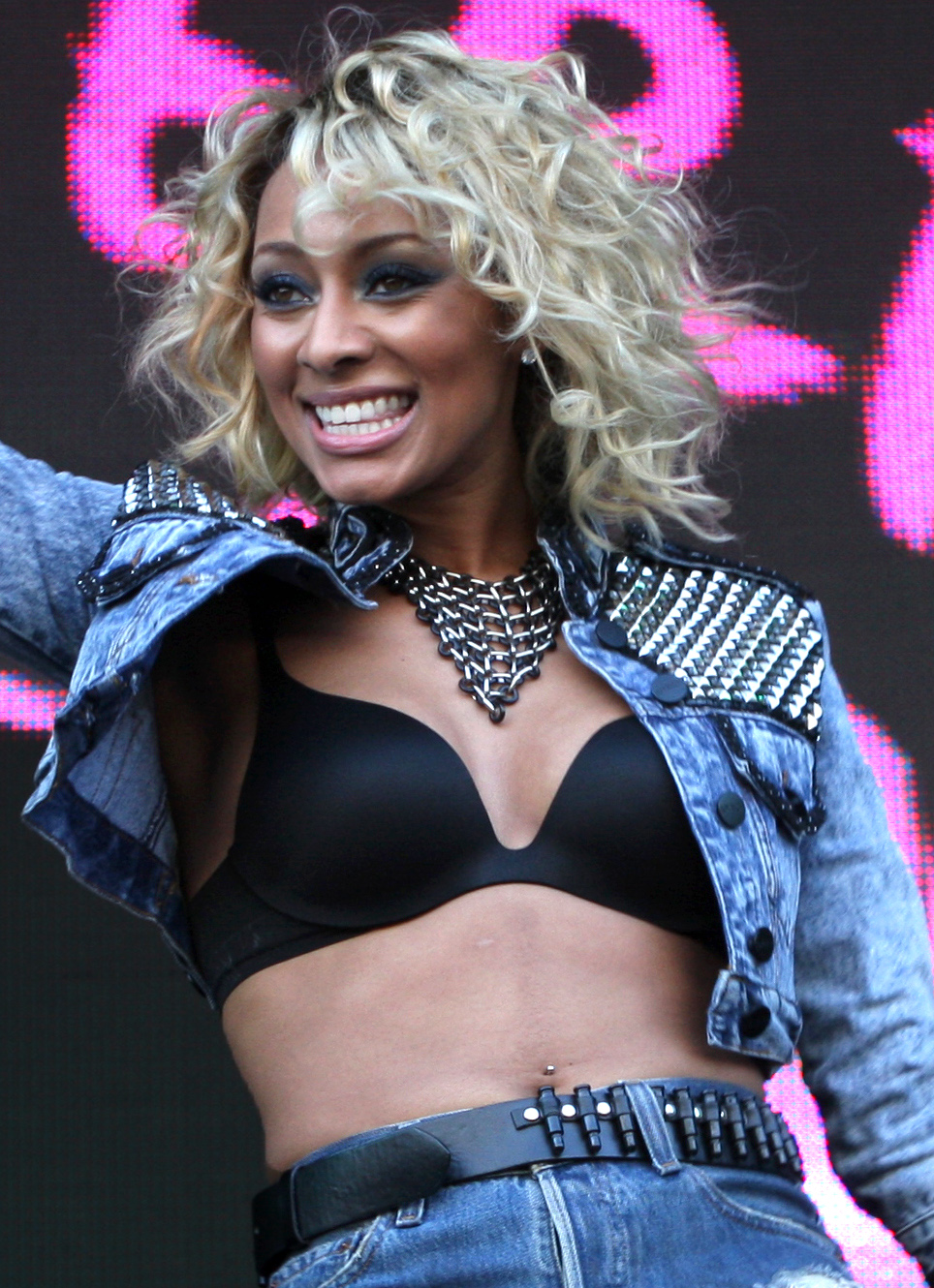
Keri Hilson

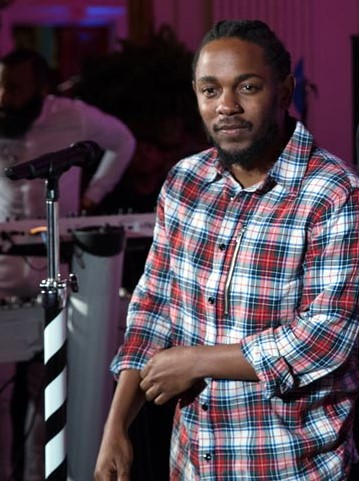
Kendrick Lamar

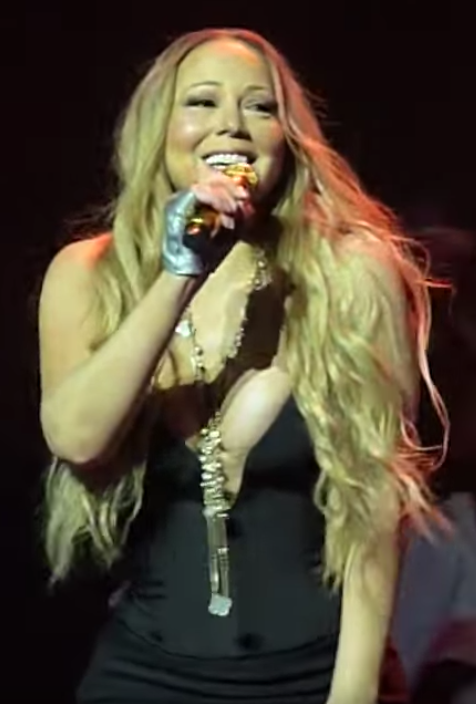
Mariah Carey

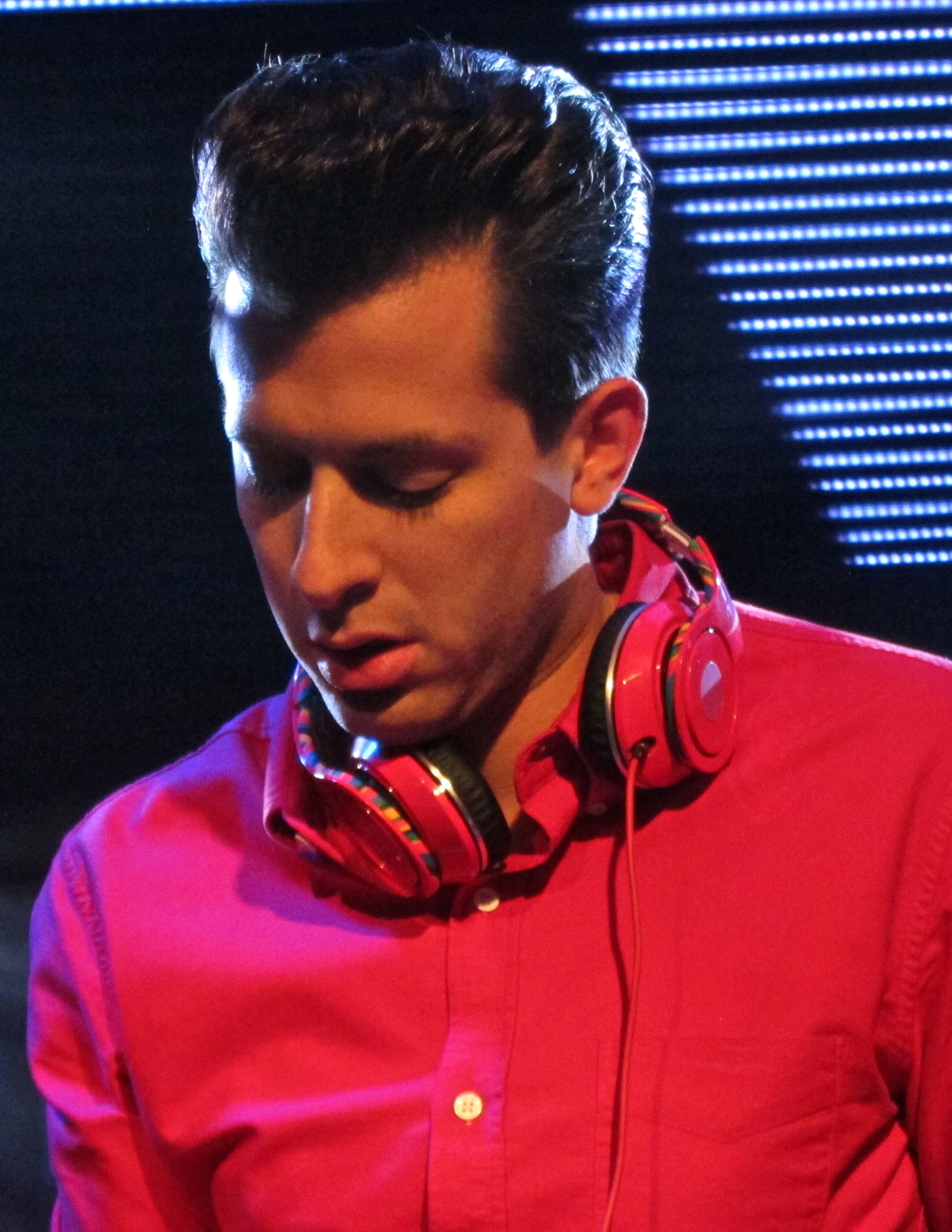
Mark Ronson

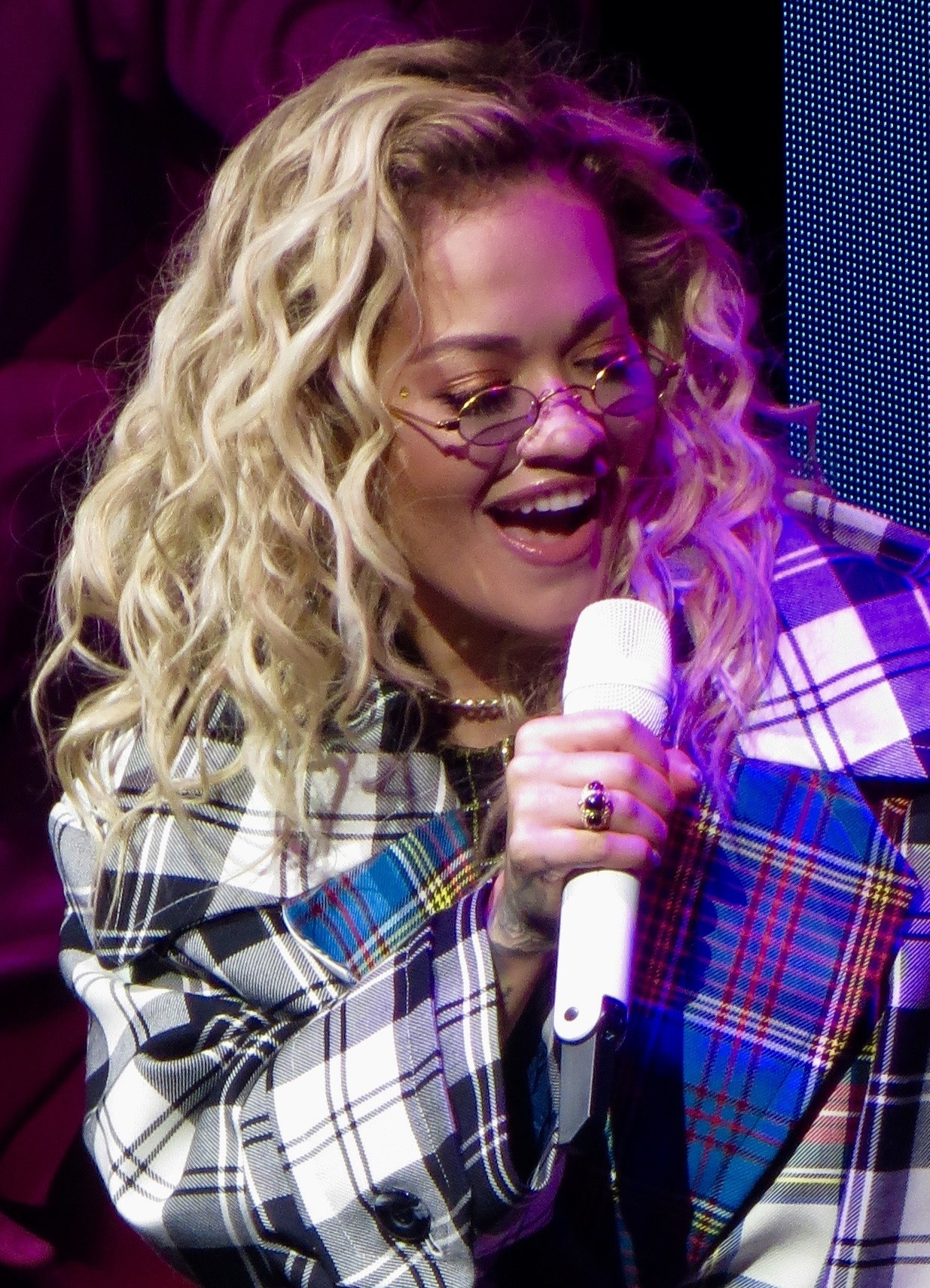
Rita Ora

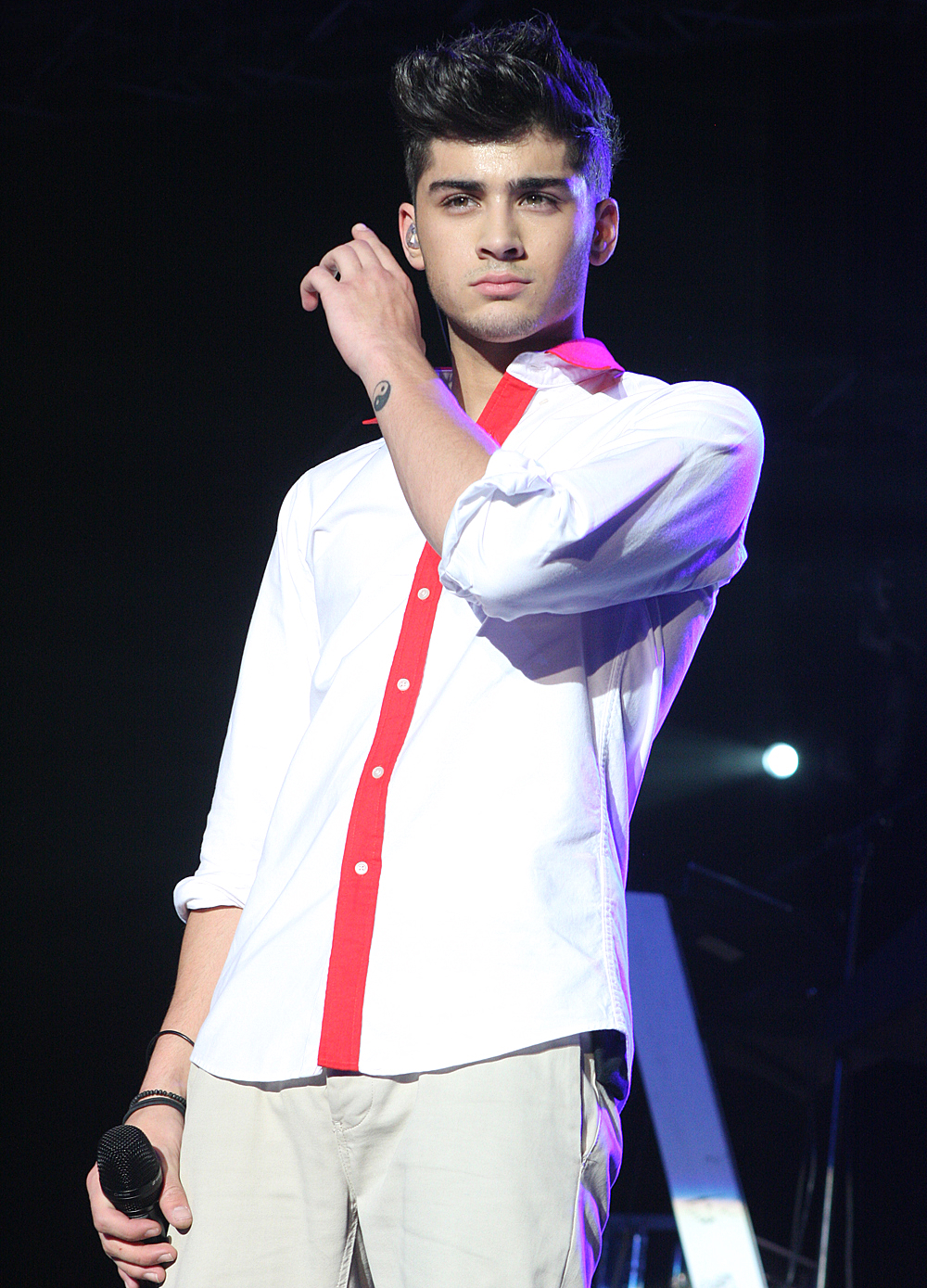
Zayn Malik

- Adam Levine of Maroon 5 contributed to a Rolling Stones column declaring that "I never met him, but he was probably the single most important musical influence for me."
- Amy Winehouse, who said in a 2004 interview, "I could never decide whether I wanted to be Michael Jackson or marry him. I don't care what people say about him now because he's a fucking genius."
- Ariana Grande's early UK screen test for Nickelodeon contained a question on who would she trade places with for one day to which she chose Michael Jackson. Her tribute to him, "ABC" she put in the description, "I have his music to inspire me."
- Billy Martin of Good Charlotte, "I've got every Michael Jackson album [...] He is one of my major musical influences."
- Bruno Mars, a long-time fan, explains Jackson set the bar for music artists for his "attention to detail [...] Any artist, I don't care what genre you do, you should always aspire to be like Michael Jackson." Mars wrote a dedication across on his social media platforms that Michael Jackson "will forever be the man that turned music into magic."
- South Korean band BTS has cited Jackson as a major influence, and the members also own various memorabilia of Jackson. Their dance cover of "Black or White" and "Love Never Felt So Good" were aired on television. Their first English single "Dynamite" is an indirect homage to Jackson's dance moves while their second English single "Butter" begins with a Smooth Criminal reference.
- China Anne McClain has credited Jackson as one of her influences, citing the Thriller music video was inspiration for her Calling All the Monsters music video.
- Jay Kay of acid jazz band Jamiroquai mentioned Jackson in a statement, "I was hugely influenced by Off the Wall particularly. He will always be remembered for that level of brilliance which will doubtless never be replicated again."
- Kendrick Lamar is influenced by Jackson and in a CBS Morning interview says he is his dream collaboration. In an interview on The Tonight Show Starring Jimmy Fallon, he called Michael Jackson "the legend". Lamar's award-winning album To Pimp a Butterfly references Jackson twice, in "King Kunta" and "Mortal Man".
- Keri Hilson, "Michael Jackson has been an influence so much to why I love the stage. I remember particularly a performance of his song, "Dirty Diana". I was in the nosebleeds section, but I felt so much a part of his whole show. That has never happened since, never happened before that, and don't think it will ever happen again."
- Lady Gaga has named Jackson as a source of her influence, both musically and fashionably. She owns around 400 pieces from his personal collection, buying them through auction. In 2016, she wore Jackson's jacket from his 1990 visit to the White House at Hillary Clinton's final campaign rally, during the 2016 U.S. presidential election.
- Mariah Carey has mentioned Michael Jackson as one of the major influences who helped shape her artistry. When asked in an interview who her inspirations were, she said "Looking at the time I was little, Michael Jackson when he was a kid, and then when he did Motown 25 when he was there making history."
- Mark Ronson, producer of Uptown Funk, is a fan of Jackson's music, and dedicated a tribute mixtape for him called "Mark Ronson Presents Rhymefest - Man In The Mirror". In Thriller 40 documentary he says, "Michael saw that he could touch greatness with Off The Wall. Knew he was still going against racist radio and people that wanted to put him in a box. But you'd have to be in the rare .0001% to be able to project yourself to that."
- Miley Cyrus has a "Bad" font tattoo on her fingers in honor of her favorite album of Jackson, and expressed great admiration. "I wish I would have had some kind of determination to be like 'How can I get in touch with Michael Jackson and let him know how much he means to me?"
- Pete Wentz of Fall Out Boy stated, "Michael Jackson has been a part of my life for as long I have heard music. He in my mind is the ultimate entertainer of our generation. I can remember exact moments of my life based on Michael Jackson songs and videos." Fall Out Boy officially covered Jackson's music, releasing a studio version of "Beat It" on Live in Phoenix.
- Rita Ora references Jackson as her "king" and greatest inspiration: "I've always been a big fan but I didn't really understand how amazing he was until I got older. When you start to understand his music, it's like, "Whoa. What was he drinking? What was he breathing?" P.Y.T. (Pretty Young Thing) is my favourite song. He's an inspiration to me, and the whole world, because he was himself throughout his whole career. He wrote whatever he wanted to write and wore whatever he wanted to wear. I really admire anyone with that sort of confidence. You don't have to be famous; it's really admirable in anyone." On some concerts, she notes she wears Michael Jackson socks to keep up a high energy.
- Nigerian duo P-Square has named Jackson as their major music inspiration. In the late 1990s, the dancing group they belonged to majorly mimed Jackson's dance routines in Africa. The costumes for Invasion, which won Album of the Year in Africa was inspired by Jackson as well.
- Tyla in an interview for Vogue Japan on the artist who has the greatest influence on her is Michael Jackson, "He is loved by people of all ages all over the world and is an eternal presence." Actor Zac Efron has cited Jackson as his childhood hero, crediting HIStory as "probably the reason I'm here". Zayn Malik says Michael Jackson is his greatest inspiration. Actress and singer Zendaya says Michael Jackson's lack of profanity in every song was admirable, "I've loved Michael Jackson since the minute I was born. He always had a positive way of doing what he did. He had such a love for the art of music and tried to make people feel better through that."

=== Widening the craft ===
Michael Jackson is given mention by artists to have widened particular aspects of the music industry or expanded their view on their own ability.

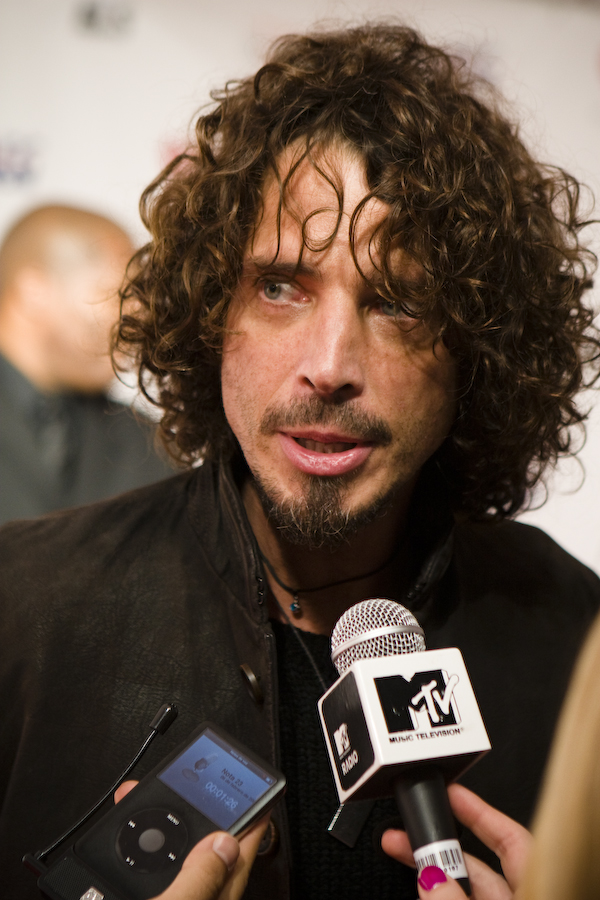
Chris Cornell

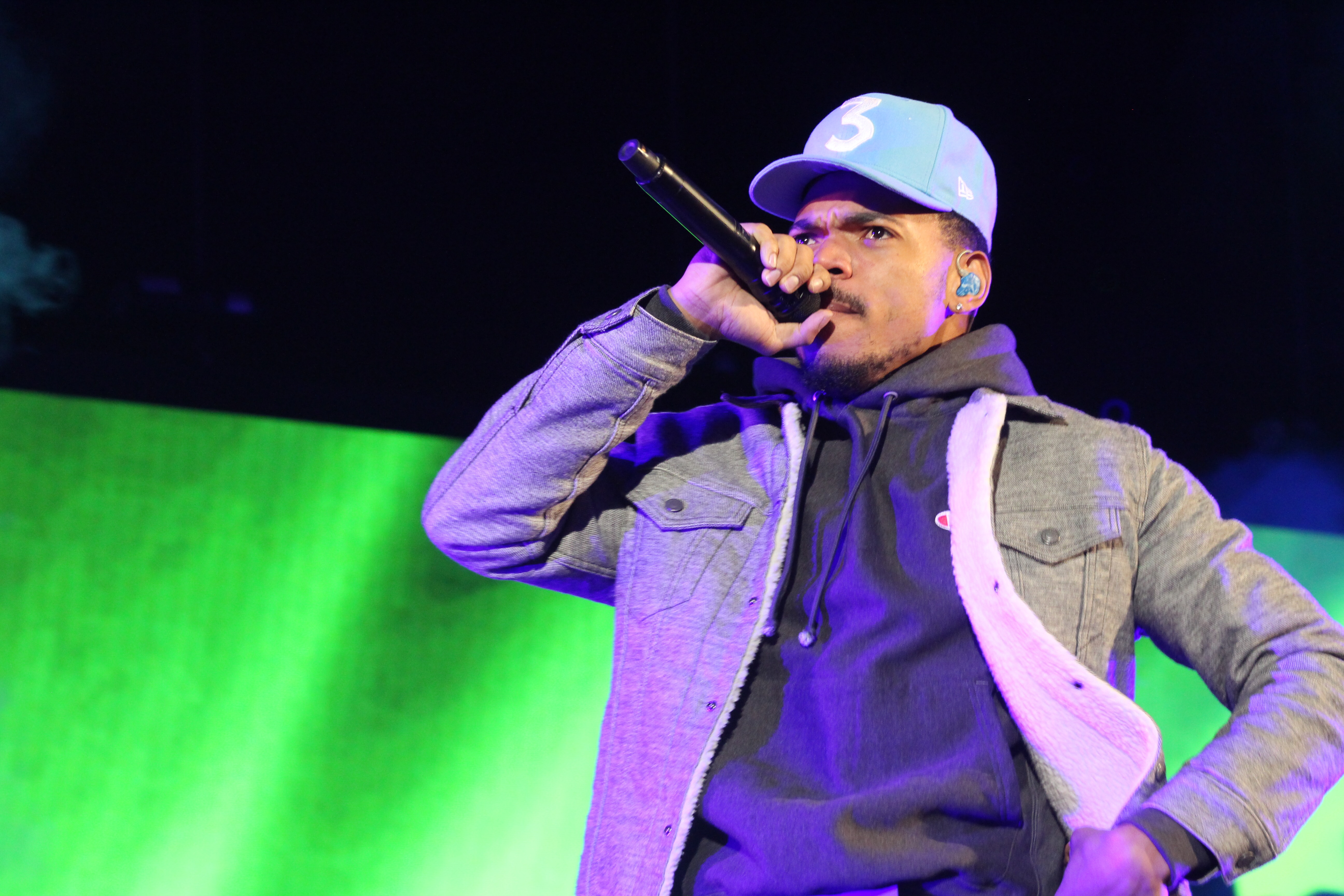
Chance the Rapper

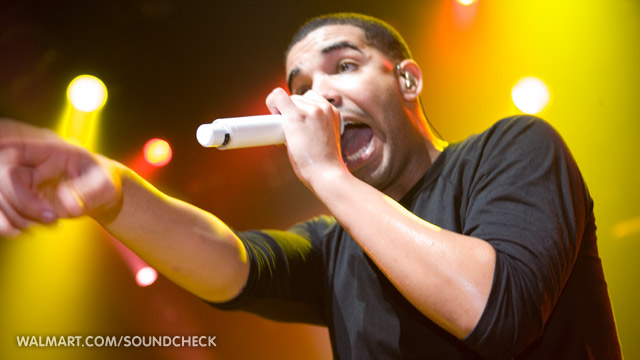
Drake

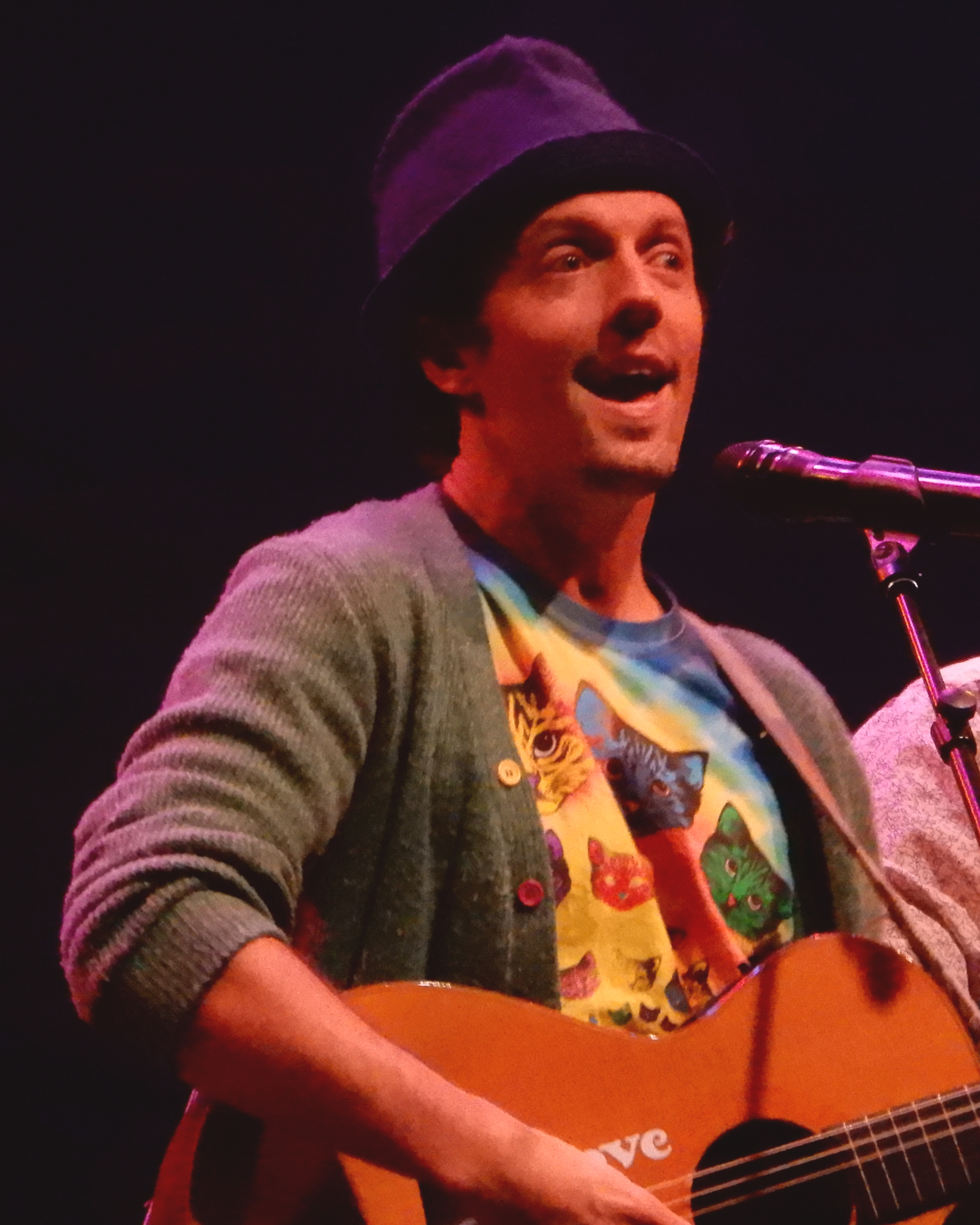
Jason Mraz

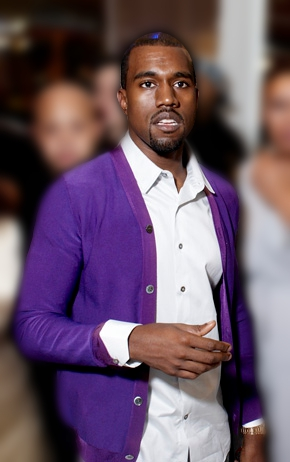
Kanye West

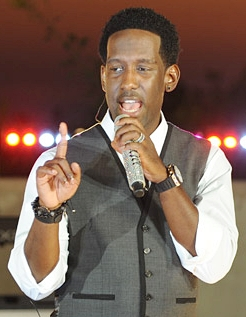
Shawn Stockman

- Chris Cornell, the singer of Soundgarden and Audioslave, "The next thing that had a clear impact was when I was already a musician, probably about 18 years old, and was working in restaurants but was also starting different bands at the time, and was obviously watching MTV all the time, just to see what was on it. I wasn't a fan of most of it. Then, "Thriller" happened, and to see that shift from pretty much an entirely white audience watching an entirely white music channel change because of this one guy [Michael Jackson]."
- Chance the Rapper did Michael Jackson impersonations at his school talent shows and exclusively only listened to him up until the fifth grade. Once becoming a musician, Michael Jackson's philanthropic side and social commentary greatly inspired him and helped shape his desire to make activism part of his artistry.
- Drake challenged the snub of "One Dance" in other categories following his 2017 Grammys Award for Best Rap Song win for Hotline Bling, "There's pop obligations that [the Recording Academy] have," he said. "And I fluked out and got one of the biggest songs of the year, that is a pop song, and I'm proud of that. I love the rap world, and I love the rap community, but I write pop songs for a reason. I want to be like Michael Jackson." Scorpion and Certified Lover Boy have featured or were inspired by Jackson posthumously.
- Jason Mraz who is known primarily for acoustic songs, says he wanted to make a dance album, "[Michael Jackson] That brilliant falsetto, the groovy songs, the harmony with his brothers. It dominated music through the 1970s and 1980s. It was how I learned to dance through his records."
- Kanye West interviewed with BBC Radio 1's Zane Lowe, "There would be no Kanye West without Michael Jackson [...] I would not be Kanye West were it not for Michael Jackson. He had to fight to get his video played because he was black." West has name dropped him in multiple songs, most controversially the line "[I am] The only rapper compared to Michael" for "I Am a God". West also credits Jackson for his inspiration to make his 2008 album 808s & Heartbreak as he mentioned that when the pair met in New York City a year prior, West had played him "Good Life" and said Jackson loved his singing voice.
- Shawn Stockman of Boyz II Men said witnessing the achievements of Jackson was a massive inspiration to the black community. On June 27, 2009 in Atlantic City, they sang a tribute to him and following a playback of Billie Jean he ranted, "I have to say something about this song. This song right here revolutionized music as we know it. Here's the bug out. MTV did not want to play (broadcast) this song. I remember that. For those that don't remember, there was a big controversy around this song. They didn't want to play it because it was R&B music." He also declared, "If there wasn't Michael Jackson, there would be no little dudes from South Philly like myself trying to emulate his moves [...] There would be no Boyz II Men."

=== Overall impact ===
Michael Jackson has also been referenced by artists as a major influence on the music industry.

- Alicia Keys gave her thoughts, "I think Michael Jackson has influenced every performer on the face of the earth. What he really inspired me to do and influenced me to do is my best, and I feel like what he represented is quality and craftsmanship with his performance."
- David Cook, winner of American Idol season 7 highlighted Jackson, "I think the impact that Michael Jackson has on me as an artists is the same impact he's really had on everyone as an artist," says Cook. "He blew pop music wide open, you know, and made it bigger than just music."
- Ed Sheeran hailed Michael Jackson as the most influential artist of the past 25 years in an interview with Q Magazine. John Mayer wrote a Time article on Jackson's influence on himself and music as a whole, "I mean, what are the '80s? A Rubik's Cube, 3-D glasses and Michael Jackson. [...] As a musician, the man was one of the purest substances ever in music. [...] They don't want to remember that that kind of greatness is achievable because it skews the bell curve completely." Katy B described, "You can have the youngest boy who wanted to be Michael Jackson learning his dance routines, and the girliest girl [also]. I just think his music can just connect with different kinds of people. [...] I just think that's amazing."

== Academia ==
In academia, there are several courses available on Michael Jackson in universities. Librarians from Texas Tech University gathered a list of scholarly papers and peer-reviewed articles which found him referenced in psychology, medical, chemistry, mass communications and engineering journals. They gathered 100 databases information for a special issue of The Journal of Pan African Studies on Jackson, calling the breadth of his influence "truly astounding". A 2026 study by researchers at Radboud University and the Delft University of Technology found that since the 1990s, at least 65 peer-reviewed papers across various disciplines had titles quoting or making puns related to Jackson's song names or lyrics, making him the third most quoted band and musician, behind The Beatles (3200 references) and Elvis Presley (195 references).

=== Academic programs ===
Examples of academic courses and programs
Academic institution	Type and description	Ref.
American University	Seminar, Reading Michael Jackson	
Arizona State University	Course, MUS 354 Popular Music: Michael Jackson	
Berklee College of Music	Course, ENDS-405 Pop Icons: the Music of Michael Jackson, Prince, and Whitney Houston	
Clark Atlanta University	MBA Course, Michael Jackson: The Business of Music	
Duke University	Course, MUSIC 336 The Black Performance Tradition: Michael Jackson and Prince	
Harvard Business School	Case, Negotiating in a Hurricane: John Branca and the Michael Jackson Estate	
Rockefeller University	Seminar, The Role of Clinical Pharmacology in the Michael Jackson Trial	
Sonoma State University	Program, Michael Jackson's Impact in the 1980s	
Temple University	Course, DANC 1821: Michael Jackson - Entertainer, Artist, Celebrity	
University of Washington Tacoma	Course, TCORE 104 C: The King of Pop, Reading Michael Jackson	
Yale University	Conference, Regarding Michael Jackson: Performing Racial, Gender, and Sexual Difference Center Stage	

=== Research works ===
Examples of research journals and lab publications
Discipline and topic	Publishing institution, article and publication year
Economics, Post-industrial society	Oxford University Press, Unfinished business: Michael Jackson, Detroit, and the figural economy of American Deindustrialization (2017)
Zoology, Entomology	American Association for the Advancement of Science, The Michael Jackson Fly (2014)
Dermatology, Vitiligo studies	Journal of Clinical and Aesthetic Dermatology, The Michael Jackson and Winnie Harlow Effect: Impact on Vitiligo Awareness on the Internet (2019)
Music, Human–computer interaction	Zhejiang University, Hearing with the eyes: modulating lyrics typography for music visualization (2024)
Kinesiology, Biomechanics	Ternopil Volodymyr Hnatiuk National Pedagogical University, Kinesiology of Michael Jackson's Gravitational Tilt (2023)
Semiotics, Social semiotics	Routledge, The Face of Ruin: Evidentiary Spectacle and the Trial of Michael Jackson (2007)
Ethics, Advertising management	Journal of Business Ethics, An Ethical Perspective on Necro-Advertising: The Moderating Effect of Brand Equity (2017)
Anthropology, Mythicism	University of Warsaw, Michael Jackson as a mythical hero. An anthropological perspective (2021)
Medicine, Anesthesiology	Science Translational Medicine, Awakenings; The untimely death of pop icon Michael Jackson highlighted the potentially lethal effects of the intravenous anesthetic propofol (2012)
Philosophy, Imagination	Springer Science+Business Media, Ruach Hakodesh: The Epiphanic and Cosmic Nature of Imagination in the Art of Michael Jackson and His Influence on My Image-Making (2016)
Cultural studies, Chinese hip-hop	Inter-Asia Cultural Studies, Moonwalking in Beijing: Michael Jackson, piliwu, and the origins of Chinese hip-hop (2022)
Cultural studies, Gabon postcolonialism	Journal of African Cultural Studies, 'They don't care about us': representing the black postcolonial subject through the appropriation of Michael Jackson in Gabonese urban dance (2017)
Sociology, Sociotechnology	Bulletin of Science, Technology & Society, Tweeting Prayers and Communicating Grief Over Michael Jackson Online (2010)
Law, Medical malpractice	Springer Publishing, Criminal Homicide Versus Medical Malpractice: Lessons from the Michael Jackson Case and Others (2021)
Audiometry, Vocality	International Association for the Study of Popular Music, 'The Voice in the Mirror'.Michael Jackson: From a Vocal Identity to its Double in Sound (2011)
Cultural psychology, Archetypes	Taylor & Francis, Androgyny and Stardom: Cultural Meanings of Michael Jackson (2013)
Media, Sensationalism	Duke University Press, News, Celebrity, and Vortextuality: A Study of the Media Coverage of the Michael Jackson Verdict (2010)
Accounting, Intellectual property valuation	University of New Hampshire, Pop & Perjury: The IRS Valuation War with the Estate of Michael Jackson (2023)
Language, Lexical semantics	Indonesian Journal of English Language Studies at Sanata Dharma University, Types of Idiom and Their Meaning in Michael Jackson "Thriller" Album (2021)
Neuropsychology, Precocious development	Journal for the Education of the Gifted, From Mozart to Michael Jackson: Giftedness and frailty (2012)
Language, Linguistics	Goiás State University, The importance of linguistic studies in improving Google Translate: language, neuroscience and artificial intelligence (2022)
Religion, Religious Studies	Boston University, HIStory against the World: Religion, Black Iconicity, and the Haunting Stretcher Photos of Michael Jackson and Tupac Shakur. (2023)
Anthropology, Humanism	RMIT University, Michael Jackson in a Borneo Village; or Autobricolage and Other Acts of Erasure (2021)
Psychology, Psychoanalysis	Babeș-Bolyai University, The Lost Children of Neverland (Considerations about J. M. Barrie, Peter Pan and... Michael Jackson). (2021)
Film, Film Studies	Unisinos, Horror cinematográfico e experimentação no videoclipe Thriller, de Michael Jackson (2015)
Anthropology, Ethnology	University of São Paulo, The "social life" of Michael Jackson's statue in favela Santa Marta, Rio de Janeiro: a mobile perspective over 'regimes of value' (2023)
Dance, Performance Studies	Cambridge University, The Labors of Michael Jackson: Virtuosity, Deindustrialization, and Dancing Work. (2012)
Rhetoric, Rhetorical Studies	Rhetoric Society of America, "It's Just Business": Michael Jackson's Purchase of the Beatles Catalog as Counterpunch, Copia, and Rhythmic Reparations. (2023)
Psychology, Psychopathology	Equinox Publishing, Mircea Eliade, Michael Jackson, and the Normalization of Psychopathology (2019)
Cultural Studies, Political Science	University of Hong Kong, The Roots and Routes of Michael Jackson's Global Identity (2012)
Sociology, Gender Studies	Taylor and Francis, Dilemmas of Femininity: Gender Differences in the Social Construction of Sexual Imagery (1993)
Cultural Studies, Communication	Kean University, Ritual Transformation through Michael Jackson's Music Video (2001)
Media Studies, Race Studies	Television and News Media, Michael Jackson, Television and post OP Disasters (2006)
Linguistics, Pragmatics	International Pragmatics Association, Using a category to accomplish resistance in the context of an emergency call: Michael Jackson's doctor (2016)
Psychology, Cognitive psychology	Taylor and Francis, Michael Jackson, Bin Laden and I: Functions of positive and negative, public and private flashbulb memories (2014)
Music, Orientalism	Taylor and Francis, "When You Have to Say 'I Do'": Orientalism in Michael Jackson's "Liberian Girl" (2012)
Cultural Studies, Cross-Cultural Communication	University of South Carolina, From Mao Zedong to Michael Jackson: Revisualizing culture and history in the YouTube age (2015)
Philosophy, Semiotics	Taylor and Francis, Construction of Identity in Michael Jackson's Jam (2000)
Religious Studies, Hagiography and Teratology	George State University, Hagiography, Teratology, and the "History" of Michael Jackson (2011)
Divinity, Hermeneutics	Journal of Consumer Research, Hermeneutics and Consumer Research (1994)
Criminology, rehabilitation	University of Montreal, Dance in prison, a beautiful escape from the walls? (2011)
Physics, Complex Systems	Harvard University, Synchronization in human musical rhythms and mutually interacting complex systems (2014)
Geography, Cultural Geography	Geographical Review, Revisiting Rio de Janeiro and São Paulo (1999)
Education, African American Studies	The Journal of Blacks in Higher Education, Michael Jackson at Oxford University (2001)
International Studies, Global Politics	Oxford University, "They Don't Really Care About Us!" On Political Worldviews in Popular Music (2013)
History, Cultural History	Central European History, Babylon Berlin: Media, Spectacle, and History (2020)
Forensic Science, Forensic Anesthesiology	Columbia University, The Michael Jackson Autopsy: Insights Provided by a Forensic Anesthesiologist (2011)
Neuroscience, Biomechanics	Journal of Neurosurgery, How did Michael Jackson challenge our understanding of spine biomechanics? (2018)
Urban Studies, Urban Tourism	Tourist Studies, Overcoming urban frontiers: Ordering Favela tourism actor-networks (2022)
Political Science, Identity Politics	State University of New York Press, Michael Jackson and the Quandary of a Black Identity (2021)
Fashion, Fashion Design	Celebrity Studies, 'Freaky or fabulous? Michael Jackson in Balmain': the re-evaluation of Michael Jackson as fashion icon (2010)
Visual Arts, African Art	Visual Communication Quarterly, Going Beyond the Eye: The Visual and Oral Aesthetics of Michael Jackson from an African Perspective (2013)
Literature, Figurative Language	Nommensen HKBP University, An Analysis of Figurative Language in Michael Jackson Song Lyrics (2021)
Theater, Variety Show	Dance Research / Cambridge University Press, Crossover and Commercial Dance: Race, Class and Capitalism on The Jacksons Variety Show (2025)
Marketing, Celebrity Endorsement	Advances in Economics, Management and Political Sciences, The Impact of Advertising Marketing on Pepsi Sales (2025)
Environmental Studies, Environmental Psychology	Masaryk University, Connecting to Nature in the Lab through "Earth Song": The Malleability of Implicit and Explicit Attitudes towards Nature (2015)
Peace and Conflict Studies, Peacebuilding	University of the Western Cape, Harmony amidst Conflict: Using "Heal the World" as Advocacy for Peace between Palestine and Israel (2024)
Communication Studies, Journalism	International Journal of Media & Cultural Politics, News, Celebrity, and Vortextuality: Study of the Media Coverage of the Michael Jackson Verdict (2010)
Critical Theory, Semiotics	University of Colombo, Creating Critical Theory Using Cinema-Semiotics for the Music Video Art (2018)
Ethics, Medical Ethics	Pediatric Sedation Outside of the Operating Room, Michael Jackson: Medical Ethics and What Went Wrong (2015)
Mythology, Sanctification	Celebrity Studies, Michael Jackson's 1992 concert in Bucharest: Transforming a star into a saint (2011)
Jewish Studies, Feminism Studies	Bridges: A Jewish Feminist Journal, Bridges - Eulogy for Michael Jackson (2010)
Library Studies, Bibliographic Studies	American Libraries, Making Sense of Michael Jackson (2003)

== See also ==
- List of cover versions of Michael Jackson songs
- Michael Jackson awards and nominations
- Michael Jackson records and achievements
