= Thriller (song) =

1983 single by Michael Jackson

- United States 12-inch single

Single by Michael Jackson

from the album Thriller
- B-side: "Can't Get Outta the Rain"
- Released: November 11, 1983
- Recorded: 1982
- Studio: Westlake (Los Angeles)
- Genre: Disco; funk; Halloween
- Length: 5:57 (album version/video version); 5:13 (2003 edit); 4:37 (special edit); 4:05 (remixed short version)
- Label: Epic
- Songwriter: Rod Temperton
- Producer: Quincy Jones

Michael Jackson singles chronology
"Say Say Say" (1983)	"Thriller" (1983)	"Farewell My Summer Love" (1984)

Music video
- "Thriller" on YouTube

"Thriller" is a song by the American singer Michael Jackson. It was released by Epic Records on November 11, 1983, in the UK and on January 23, 1984, in the US, as the seventh and final single from his sixth album, Thriller (1982).

"Thriller" is a disco song featuring a synthesizer bassline, lyrics, and sound effects evoking horror films. It includes a spoken-word poem performed by the horror actor Vincent Price. It was produced by Quincy Jones and written by Rod Temperton, who wanted to write a theatrical song to suit Jackson's love of film.

The "Thriller" music video, directed by John Landis, depicts Jackson dancing with a horde of zombies. It has been named the greatest music video of all time by various publications and readers' polls, and doubled sales of Thriller, helping it become the best-selling album in history.

Jackson decided to release "Thriller" as a single after its parent album left the top of the Billboard 200 chart. It became the seventh Thriller single to enter the top ten of the Billboard Hot 100, reaching number four, and reached number one in Flanders, France, Portugal, and Spain, and the top ten in many other countries. In the week of Jackson's death in 2009, it was Jackson's best-selling track in the United States, with sales of 167,000 copies. It entered the Billboard Hot Digital Songs at number two, and remained in the charts' top ten for three weeks. It appears on several of Jackson's greatest-hits albums. "Thriller" is one of the best-selling singles of all time and is certified diamond in the US. It has returned to the Billboard Hot 100 chart multiple times due to its popularity around Halloween, peaking as high as number two in 2026, forty-two years and nine months after it first made the chart, in addition to reaching number one on the Digital Song Sales and Streaming Songs charts for the first time.

"Thriller"
Jackson's song "Thriller", released as a single in 1984; Nelson George wrote that it uses cinematic sound effects, horror film motifs, and vocal trickery to convey a sense of danger.

== Composition ==
"Thriller" is a disco-funk song. It was written by the English songwriter Rod Temperton, who had previously written "Rock with You" and "Off the Wall" for Jackson's 1979 album Off the Wall. Temperton wanted to write something theatrical to suit Jackson's love of film. He improvised with bass and drum patterns until he developed the bassline that runs through the song, then wrote a chord progression that built to a climax. He recalled: "I wanted it to build and build–a bit like stretching an elastic band throughout the tune to heighten suspense." According to Hooktheory.com, "Thriller" is in the key of C♯ Dorian (the second mode of the B major scale, in which C♯ is used as the tonic) with a moderate tempo of 118 beats per minute. Classic Pop likened the bassline to that of "Give It to Me Baby" by Rick James (1981) and the synth stabs to "1999" (1982) by Prince.

Temperton's first version was titled "Starlight", with the chorus lyric: "Give me some starlight / Starlight sun". The production team, led by Quincy Jones, believed the song should be the title track, but they thought that "Starlight" was not a strong album title. Instead, they wanted something "mysterious" to match Jackson's "evolving persona". Temperton considered several titles, including "Midnight Man", which Jones felt was "going in the right direction". Finally, he conceived "Thriller", but worried that it was "a crap word to sing ... It sounded terrible! However, we got Michael to spit it into the microphone a few times and it worked."

With the title decided, Temperton wrote lyrics within "a couple of hours". The intro features sound effects such as a creaking door, thunder, footsteps, winds, and howling wolves. For the ending, Temperton envisioned a spoken-word sequence, but did not know what form it should take. Temperton wanted somebody from the horror genre to perform the rap and first suggested Cassandra Peterson in character as Elvira, Mistress of the Dark. Jones suggested Vincent Price as then-wife, Peggy Lipton. knew him. Temperton composed the words for Price's part in a taxi on the way to the studio on the day of recording.

== Recording ==
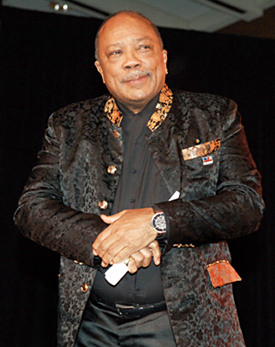
Quincy Jones produced "Thriller".

Along with the rest of the album, "Thriller" was recorded over eight weeks in 1982. It was recorded at Westlake Recording Studios on Santa Monica Boulevard in Los Angeles, California. The engineer Bruce Swedien had Jackson record his vocals in different approaches, doubling takes and recording at different distances from the microphone. Some background vocals were recorded in the studio's shower stall.

According to the synthesizer programmer, Anthony Marinelli, the bassline was performed on an ARP 2600 synthesizer, and the verse pads were performed on a Roland Jupiter-8 layered with a Prophet-5. The percussion was created with a LinnDrum drum machine modified with sound chips from two other drum machines: a snare, hi-hat and congas from an LM-1 and a clap from a TR-808. The Rhodes piano was performed by Greg Phillinganes and the guitar by David Williams.

To record the howls, Swedien set up tape recorders around his dog in a barn overnight, but it never howled. Instead, Jackson recorded the wolf howls himself, combined with sound library effects. For the creaking doors, Swedien rented doors designed for sound effects from the Universal Studios Lot and recorded the hinges. Vincent Price recorded his part in two takes; Jones, acknowledging that doing a voice-over for a song is difficult, praised Price and described his takes as "fabulous".

== Release ==
The album Thriller was released in November 1982 on Epic Records and spent months at the top of the Billboard 200. "Thriller" was not initially planned for release as a single, as Epic saw it as a novelty song. The Epic executive Walter Yetnikoff asked: "Who wants a single about monsters?"

By mid-1983, sales of the album had begun to decline. Jackson, who was "obsessive" about his sales figures, urged Yetnikoff and another Epic executive, Larry Stessel, to help conceive a plan to return the album to the top of the charts. Jackson's manager Frank DiLeo suggested releasing "Thriller", backed by a new music video. It was the final single from the album, released in the US in January 1984. Alternative versions of "Thriller", including the "Starlight" demo, were released on the 2022 anniversary reissue Thriller 40. The 2025 song "Wake Me Up" by the Canadian singer the Weeknd and French electronic duo Justice contains an interpolation of "Thriller".

== Music video ==
The music video for "Thriller" was directed by John Landis. It references numerous horror films and stars Jackson performing a dance routine with a horde of the undead. Jackson contacted Landis after seeing An American Werewolf in London, and they conceived a 13-minute short film with a budget much larger than previous music videos. Jackson's record company refused to finance it, believing Thriller had peaked, so a making-of documentary, Making Michael Jackson's Thriller, was produced to receive financing from television networks.

Michael Jackson's Thriller premiered on MTV on December 2, 1983. It was launched to great anticipation and played regularly on MTV. It doubled sales of Thriller, and the documentary sold over a million copies, becoming the best-selling videotape at the time. It is credited for transforming music videos into a serious art form, breaking down racial barriers in popular entertainment, and popularizing the making-of documentary format.

Many elements have had a lasting impact on popular culture, such as the zombie dance and Jackson's Thriller jacket, designed by Landis's wife Deborah Nadoolman Landis. The zombie dance, choreographed by Michael Peters for the music video, is re-enacted worldwide by fans and remains popular on YouTube. The Library of Congress described it as "the most famous music video of all time". In 2009, it became the first music video inducted into the National Film Registry as "culturally, historically or aesthetically" significant. In September 2024, Michael Jackson's Thriller became the fourth Jackson video to reach one billion YouTube views.

== Chart performance ==
"Thriller" entered the Billboard Hot 100 charts at number 20. It reached number seven the following week, number five the next, and hit number four in the following week, where it stayed for two weeks. It finished at number 78 on the Hot 100's year-end chart for 1984. "Thriller" debuted at number 46 on the Billboard Hot Black Singles chart, later reached its peak at number 3 on March 10, 1984. The song debuted on the UK singles chart on November 19, 1983, at number 24, and the following week hit number ten; it appeared on the chart for 52 weeks. From February 5, 1984, "Thriller" was at number one on the French Singles Chart for four weeks. It also topped the Belgian VRT Top 30 Chart for two weeks in January 1984.

Following Jackson's death in 2009, his music surged in popularity. In the week of his death, "Thriller" was Jackson's best-selling track in the US, with sales of 167,000 copies. It subsequently reached number two on the Billboard Hot Digital Songs chart dated July 11 and remained in the top ten for three consecutive weeks, yet its classification as a recurrent song made it ineligible to re-enter the Hot 100 per chart rules at the time. In the United Kingdom, it reached number 23 the week of Jackson's death and climbed to number 12 the following week. On July 12, "Thriller" reached number two on the Italian Singles Chart, and was later certified gold by the Federation of the Italian Music Industry. It also reached number three on both the Australian ARIA Chart and Swiss Singles Chart, number nine on the German Singles Chart, seven on the Norwegian Singles Chart, eight on the Irish Singles Chart and 25 on the Danish Singles Chart, and topped the Spanish Singles Chart for one week. In the third week of July, "Thriller" reached number 11 in Finland.

"Thriller" has returned to the Billboard Hot 100 chart multiple times due to its popularity around Halloween. It re-entered the chart in October 2013 at number 42, number 31 in November 2018, and number 19 in November 2021, its highest placement since 1984. This gave Jackson at least one top-20 hit across seven consecutive decades from 1969 on the Billboard Hot 100. "Thriller" reached number one on the Billboard R&B/Hip-Hop Streaming Songs, R&B Streaming Songs and R&B Digital Song Sales charts the week of November 8, 2023, more than a decade after Jackson's death. On the week of November 9, 2024, "Thriller" topped a Billboard multimetric chart for the first time, reaching the top spot on Hot R&B Songs.

In 2025, "Thriller" reached number 10 on the Billboard Hot 100, making Jackson the first artist to secure a top-ten position in six different decades, discounting his top-ten entry as a member of the Jackson 5 in 1969 with "I Want You Back". On the week of November 14, 2026, "Thriller" reached a new peak at number 2 on the Hot 100, forty-two years and nine months after its chart debut. It soared to 17.4 million streams, 11.3 million in radio reach and 4,000 sold in the tracking week, reaching number one on the Digital Song Sales and Streaming Songs charts for the first time. "Thriller" also achieved its highest position in the UK singles chart in November 2026, reaching number five.

"Thriller" was certified platinum in the US on December 4, 1989, for sales of over one million physical copies. As of August 2016, it had sold 4,024,398 copies in the US. It was later certified diamond for sales over 10 million equivalent-units.

== Critical reception ==
Ashley Lasimone, of AOL's Spinner.com, noted that it "became a signature for Jackson" and described "the groove of its bassline, paired with Michael's killer vocals and sleek moves" as having "produced a frighteningly great single." Jon Pareles of The New York Times noted that "'Billie Jean', 'Beat It', 'Wanna Be Startin' Somethin' ' and "the movie in the song 'Thriller'", were the songs, unlike the "fluff" "P.Y.T.", that were "the hits that made Thriller a world-beater; along with Mr. Jackson's stage and video presence, listeners must have identified with his willingness to admit terror." Ann Powers of the Los Angeles Times described "Thriller" as "adequately groovy" with a "funked-out beat" and lyrics "seemingly lifted from some little kid's 'scary storybook'".

== Personnel ==
- Written and composed by Rod Temperton

Musicians

- Michael Jackson – lead and background vocals
- Vincent Price – spoken word
- Rod Temperton and Brian Banks – synthesizers
- Greg Phillinganes – synthesizers, Rhodes piano
- David Williams – guitar
- Jerry Hey, Gary Grant – trumpets, flugelhorns
- Larry Williams – saxophone, flute
- Bill Reichenbach – trombone
- Michael Boddicker (uncredited) – synthesizers and drum machine
- Leon "Ndugu" Chancler (uncredited) – drums

Technical team

- Produced by Quincy Jones
- Recorded and mixed by Bruce Swedien
- Vocal, rhythm and synthesizer arrangement by Rod Temperton
- Horn arrangement by Jerry Hey
- Effects by Bruce Cannon and Bruce Swedien
- Synthesizer programming by Anthony Marinelli

== Charts ==
=== Weekly charts ===
Weekly chart performance
Chart (1983–1985)	Peak position
Argentina (CAPIF)	1
Australia (Kent Music Report)	4
Belgium (Ultratop 50 Flanders)	1
Canada Top Singles (The Record)	4
Canada Top Singles (RPM)	3
Chile (UPI)	2
Europe (European Hot 100 Singles)	4
Finland (Suomen virallinen singlelista)	7
Finland Jukebox (Suomen virallinen singlelista)	3
France (SNEP)	1
Ireland (IRMA)	4
Netherlands (Dutch Top 40)	3
Netherlands (Single Top 100)	4
New Zealand (Recorded Music NZ)	6
Peru (UPI)	2
Portugal (AFP)	1
South Africa (Springbok)	26
Spain (AFYVE)	1
UK singles (OC)	10
US Cashbox	4
US Billboard Hot 100	4
US Billboard Hot Black Singles	3
US Billboard Adult Contemporary	24
US Billboard Album Rock Tracks	42
US Radio & Records CHR/Pop Airplay Chart	1
West Germany (GfK)	9

Weekly chart performance
Chart (2006)	Peak position
France (SNEP)	35
Germany (Media Control Charts)	9
Ireland (IRMA)	8
Italy (FIMI)	5
Netherlands (Single Top 100)	34
Spain (PROMUSICAE)	1
Switzerland (Schweizer Hitparade)	43

Weekly chart performance
Chart (2007)	Peak position
Spain (Promusicae)	20
UK singles (OC)	57

Weekly chart performance
Chart (2008)	Peak position
Austria (Ö3 Austria Top 40)	55
Norway (VG-lista)	13
Switzerland (Schweizer Hitparade)	53
UK singles (OC)	35

Weekly chart performance
Chart (2009)	Peak position
Australia (ARIA)	3
Austria (Ö3 Austria Top 40)	5
Belgium (Ultratop 50 Back Catalogue Singles Flanders)	3
Belgium (Ultratop 30 Back Catalogue Singles Wallonia)	2
Denmark (Tracklisten)	25
Europe (European Hot 100 Singles)	16
Finland (Suomen virallinen lista)	11
France (SNEP)	3
Ireland (IRMA)	8
Italy (FIMI)	2
Japan Singles Top 100 (Oricon)	41
Netherlands (Single Top 100)	9
New Zealand (RIANZ)	12
Norway (VG-lista)	7
Spain (Promusicae)	1
Sweden (Sverigetopplistan)	10
Switzerland (Schweizer Hitparade)	3
UK singles (OC)	12
US Digital Song Sales (Billboard)	2

Weekly chart performance
Chart (2010)	Peak position
Spain (Promusicae)	12
Switzerland (Schweizer Hitparade)	68
UK singles (OC)	68

Weekly chart performance
Chart (2012)	Peak position
France (SNEP)	143
Ireland (IRMA)	30
UK singles (OC)	49

Weekly chart performance
Chart (2013)	Peak position
France (SNEP)	159
UK singles (OC)	48
US Billboard Hot 100	42
US Billboard Hot R&B/Hip-Hop Songs	14

Weekly chart performance
Chart (2014)	Peak position
France (SNEP)	152
Spain (Promusicae)	38
UK singles (OC)	57
US Billboard Hot 100	35
US Billboard Hot R&B/Hip-Hop Songs	9

Weekly chart performance
Chart (2015)	Peak position
France (SNEP)	145
Spain (Promusicae)	48
UK singles (OC)	61
US Billboard Hot 100	45
US Billboard Hot R&B/Hip-Hop Songs	16

Weekly chart performance
Chart (2016)	Peak position
France (SNEP)	164
UK singles (OC)	62

Weekly chart performance
Chart (2017)	Peak position
France (SNEP)	46
Spain (Promusicae)	32
UK singles (OC)	34

Weekly chart performance
Chart (2018)	Peak position
Canada Hot 100 (Billboard)	25
UK singles (OC)	63
US Billboard Hot 100	31

Weekly chart performance
Chart (2019)	Peak position
US Billboard Hot 100	44

Weekly chart performance
Chart (2020)	Peak position
Global 200	51
UK singles (OC)	57
US Billboard Hot 100	48

Weekly chart performance
Chart (2021)	Peak position
Canada (Canadian Hot 100)	16
Global 200 (Billboard)	28
UK Singles (Official Charts)	40
US Billboard Hot 100	19

Weekly chart performance
Chart (2022)	Peak position
Canada (Canadian Hot 100)	25
Global 200	37
UK singles (OC)	41
US Billboard Hot 100	26

Weekly chart performance
Chart (2023)	Peak position
Canada (Canadian Hot 100)	22
Global 200	39
UK Singles (Official Charts)	20
US Billboard Hot 100	21
US Billboard Hot R&B/Hip-Hop Songs	3

Weekly chart performance
Chart (2024)	Peak position
Canada (Canadian Hot 100)	19
Global 200	29
UK singles (OC)	51
US Billboard Hot 100	20
US Billboard Hot R&B/Hip-Hop Songs	7

Weekly chart performance
Chart (2025)	Peak position
Canada (Canadian Hot 100)	8
Germany (Media Control Charts)	73
Global 200 (Billboard)	18
Ireland (IRMA)	11
Panama International (PRODUCE)	50
Portugal (AFP)	96
UK singles (OC)	9
US Billboard Hot 100	10
US Billboard Hot R&B/Hip-Hop Songs	3

Weekly chart performance
Chart (2026)	Peak position
Canada Hot 100 (Billboard)	4
Croatia International Airplay (Top lista)	46
France (SNEP)	51
Global 200 (Billboard)	4
Greece International (IFPI)	32
Iceland (Billboard)	20
Ireland (IRMA)	8
Italy (FIMI)	68
Luxembourg (Billboard)	11
Panama Streaming (PRODUCE)	100
Portugal (AFP)	55
Russia Streaming (TopHit) Anton Neumark remix	83
UK singles (OC)	5
UK Hip Hop/R&B (Official Charts)	1
US Billboard Hot 100	2

=== Year-end charts ===
Year-end chart performance
Chart (1984)	Position
Australia (Kent Music Report)	17
Belgium (Ultratop Flanders)	26
Chile (UPI)	1
US Billboard Hot 100	78

Year-end chart performance
Chart (2009)	Position
Sweden (Sverigetopplistan)	88
Switzerland (Schweizer Hitparade)	81
UK Singles (Official Charts Company)	143

== Certifications ==
Certifications
Region	Certification	Certified units/sales
Australia (ARIA)	6× Platinum	420,000^{‡}
Canada (Music Canada)	6× Platinum	480,000^{‡}
Denmark (IFPI Danmark)	Platinum	90,000^{‡}
France (SNEP)	Platinum	1,000,000^{*}
Germany (BVMI)	Gold	250,000^{‡}
Italy (FIMI)	Platinum	30,000^{‡}
Mexico (AMPROFON)	Diamond+3× Platinum+Gold	510,000^{‡}
New Zealand (RMNZ)	3× Platinum	90,000^{‡}
Portugal (AFP)	Gold	5,000^{‡}
Spain (Promusicae) Digital sales through 2014	2× Platinum	80,000^{*}
Spain (Promusicae) Sales + streams since 2015	2× Platinum	200,000^{‡}
United Kingdom (BPI) Digital sales since 2004	3× Platinum	1,800,000^{‡}
United Kingdom (BPI) other release	Gold	500,000^{‡}
United States (RIAA)	Diamond	10,000,000^{‡}
Streaming
Greece (IFPI Greece)	Gold	1,000,000^{†}
Ringtone
Japan (RIAJ) Full-length ringtone	Platinum	250,000^{*}
United States (RIAA) Mastertone	Gold	500,000^{*}
Summaries
Worldwide Physical / Pure Sales	—	9,000,000
^{*} Sales figures based on certification alone.^{‡} Sales+streaming figures based on certification alone.^{†} Streaming-only figures based on certification alone.

== See also ==
- List of best-selling singles
- List of highest-certified digital singles in the United States
- List of most expensive music videos
- Michael Jackson's Thriller
- Thriller (viral video)
- Thrill the World

== Bibliography ==
- Brooks, Darren (2002). Michael Jackson: An Exceptional Journey. Chrome Dreams. ISBN 1-84240-178-5.
- George, Nelson (2004). Michael Jackson: The Ultimate Collection (booklet). Sony BMG.
- Grant, Adrian (2009). Michael Jackson: The Visual Documentary. Omnibus Press. ISBN 978-1-84938-261-8.
- Jones, Jel (2005). Michael Jackson, the King of Pop: The Big Picture: the Music! the Man! the Legend! the Interviews!. Amber Books Publishing. ISBN 0-9749779-0-X.
- Taraborrelli, J. Randy (2004). The Magic and the Madness. Terra Alta, WV: Headline. ISBN 0-330-42005-4.
- Halstead, Craig (2003). Michael Jackson The Solo Years. On-Line Ltd. ISBN 978-0-7552-0091-7.
