= Julien's Auctions =

Privately held auction house based in Beverly Hills, California

- Type: Private
- Industry: Art, auctions
- Founded: 2003; 23 years ago
- Headquarters: 13007 S. Western Avenue, Gardena, California 90249
- Key people: Darren Julien (Founder, President); Martin J. Nolan (Executive Director, Founder)
- Website: www.juliensauctions.com

Julien's Auctions is a privately held auction house based in Beverly Hills, California. Founded in 2003 by Darren Julien and co-owned with Martin Nolan, the company specializes in auctions related to television (TV), film, music, sports, fashion, and contemporary or fine art.

The auction house is known for managing the sales of collections and estates from numerous high-profile entertainers. They have handled memorabilia from notable figures including; Marilyn Monroe, John Lennon, Ringo Starr, Banksy, Cher, Bob Mackie, Michael Jackson, Tompkins and Bush, Slash, Ronnie Wood, Bill Wyman, Frank Zappa, Greta Garbo, Nirvana, Hugh Hefner, Sharon Tate, Pelé, Elvis Presley, Burt Reynolds, Johnny Cash, Neil Young, Sylvester Stallone, Frank Sinatra, Whitney Houston, Prince, Madonna, Olivia Newton-John, Bette Midler, Mae West, Barbra Streisand, Jane Fonda, Aretha Franklin, Janet Jackson, Amy Winehouse, Elizabeth Taylor, Doris Day, Betty White, Don McLean, Fleetwood Mac, Christine McVie, Bruce Lee, Rick Ross, Bob Dylan, Sir Laurence Olivier & Dame Joan Plowright, Tony Bennett, James Arness, Dennis Weaver, Leonard Cohen, Harry Belafonte, David Lynch, Gwyneth Paltrow.

Julien's Auctions gained significant public attention in 2009 for the sale of one of Michael Jackson's bejeweled white gloves, which realized a final price of $420,000.

In the years since gaining worldwide popularity, the auction house has also become the exclusive auction partner for Gibson, Turner Classic Movies, MusiCares, The Black Music Action Coalition, and many other notable charities.

== Notable auctions and sales records ==
- In June 2025, a 1988 Bellville Sassoon floral day dress belonging to Princess Diana sold for $520,000. The dress' value was significantly heightened by its history as a staple in her working wardrobe and its nickname, the "Caring Dress," which it earned because Diana specifically chose the cheerful floral print for her many visits to hospitals and with patients, making it a tangible symbol of her renowned humanitarian work.
- In February 2025, Banksy's original "TV Girl" street art mural sold for $222,250, its value rooted in a detailed and unique provenance. Executed on a transformer box door in Berlin during his 2003/2004 German tour—prior to the formation of his authentication body, Pest Control—the work was sold with authenticating marks from other street artists still intact. Its rare journey from a public urban landscape to the auction block was further solidified by a letter of provenance from the city work crew that officially removed the panels, documenting the preservation of this ephemeral piece.
- In November 2024, an original hero Phaser prop used by William Shatner as Captain Kirk in Star Trek: The Original Series sold for a stunning $910,000. The exceptional price for this iconic, screen-matched prop was driven by its extreme rarity, as it is one of only four "hero" versions created for the show that featured the intricate details and moving parts seen on-screen.
- Similarly, in November 2024, Captain Kirk's hero Communicator prop from Star Trek: The Original Series commanded a remarkable $780,000.The prop's high value and desirability were attributed to it being one of only two hero Communicator props ever created for and used by William Shatner during the production of the show.
- In September 2024, the St. Vincent-St. Mary high school jersey photo-matched to LeBron James' legendary "The Chosen One" Sports Illustrated cover sold for $1,300,000. The jersey's immense historical value is tied to its unique, dual provenance: it is the exact jersey James wore during the February 2002 photoshoot for his first-ever cover that anointed him as basketball's heir apparent, and he also wore it in a high school game later that same day where he scored 32 points, making it a definitive artifact from the beginning of his celebrated career.
- In May 2024, John Lennon's 12-string Hootenanny, heard on Help! album and film, had not been seen or played for half a century sold for $2.9 million, setting a new world record for the highest-selling guitar at auction in Beatles history.

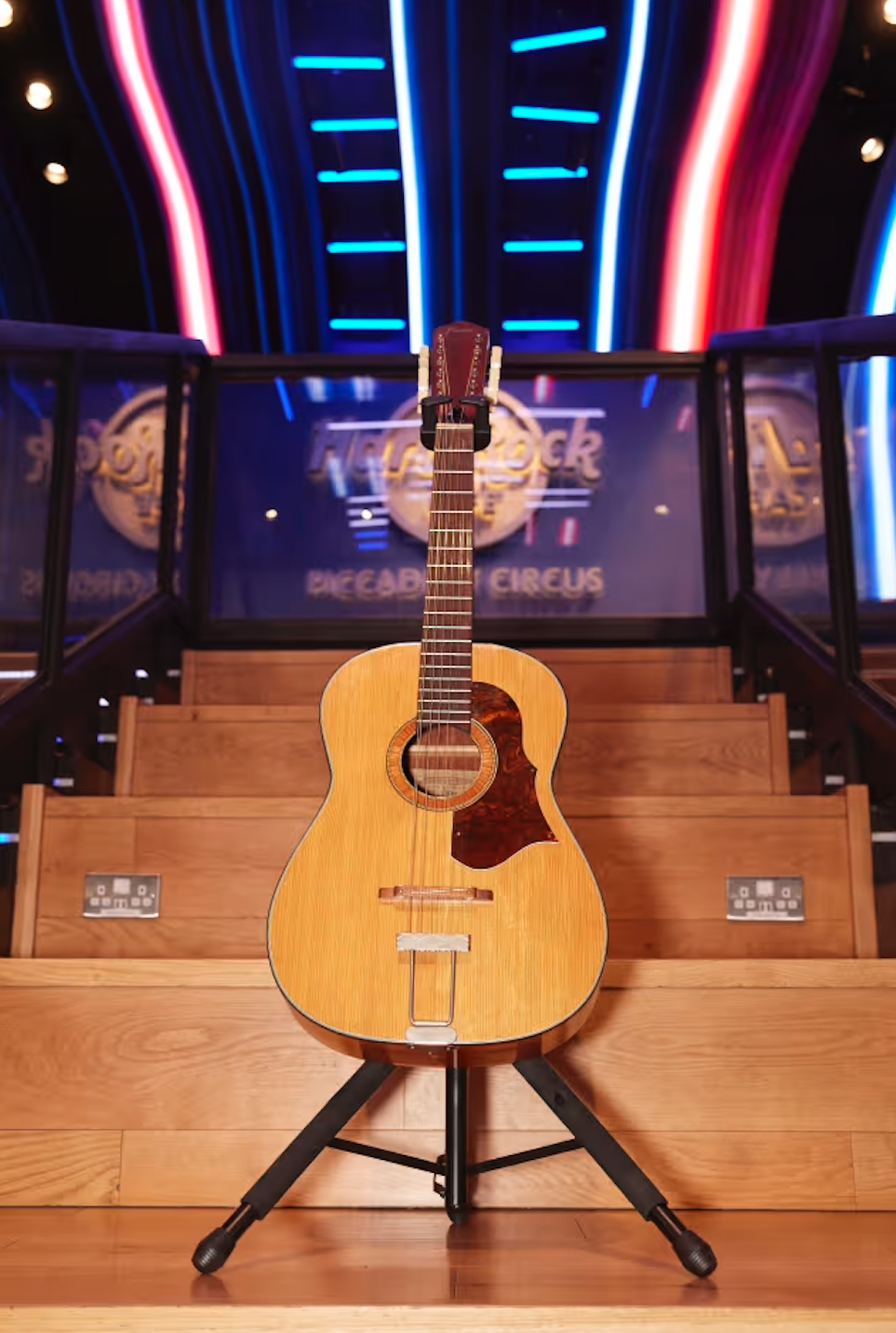
John Lennon guitar

- In December 2023, a Jacques Azagury black and blue evening dress worn by Princess Diana sold for $1.15 million, setting a new world record for the most expensive Princess Diana dress ever sold.
- In June 2020, the guitar used by Kurt Cobain on Nirvana's MTV Unplugged in New York sold for $6 million.
- In December 2017, Neil Young's 1953 Buick Roadmaster sold for $400,000.
- In June 2016, world association football icon Pelé auctioned off his personal career-related memorabilia totaling over $5,000,000.
- In November 2016, Marilyn Monroe's "Happy Birthday, Mr. President" dress sold for $4,800,000. As of 2022, it remains the most expensive gown ever bought at an auction.
- In November 2015, a Gibson J-160E guitar that was stolen from John Lennon in the late 1960s sold for $2,410,000. The same auction also sold Ringo Starr's 1964 drumhead from The Ed Sullivan Show for $5,050,000.
- In December 2015, Ringo Starr's drum kit achieved a World Record for "Most Expensive Drum Kit" when it sold for $9,110,000; in that same auction, Starr's personal copy of The Beatles White Album sold for $990,000.
- In December 2011, a 1915 prototype for Coca-Cola's iconic bottle sold for $240,000 with its original concept drawing selling for $228,000.
- In October 2010, the company's first auction in Asia took place at Ponte 16 Macau, the 'Most Expensive Basketball' is sold from a Michael Jackson and Michael Jordan video for $304,000.
- In 2009, Michael Jackson's signature white glove sold for $420,000 and his white socks sold for $65,000; in 2011 the jacket he wore in his 1983 "Thriller" music video sold for $1,800,000.
- A left-handed 1989 Takamine FP360SC guitar played by Kurt Cobain during a 1991 Nirvana recording session is expected to sell for up to $500,000 at Julien’s Auctions in late May 2025. Although it was a rental guitar and not owned by Cobain, the guitar was used in a session featuring rare tracks and recordings by Nirvana, including an unreleased demo.
