= Thrill the World =

Annual dance event based on "Thriller"

- Status: Active
- Genre: International dance event and world record attempt
- Date: Saturday preceding Halloween
- Frequency: Annually
- Location: Worldwide
- Years active: 2006–present
- Inaugurated: October 29, 2006
- Founder: Ines Markeljevic
- Website: thrilltheworld.com

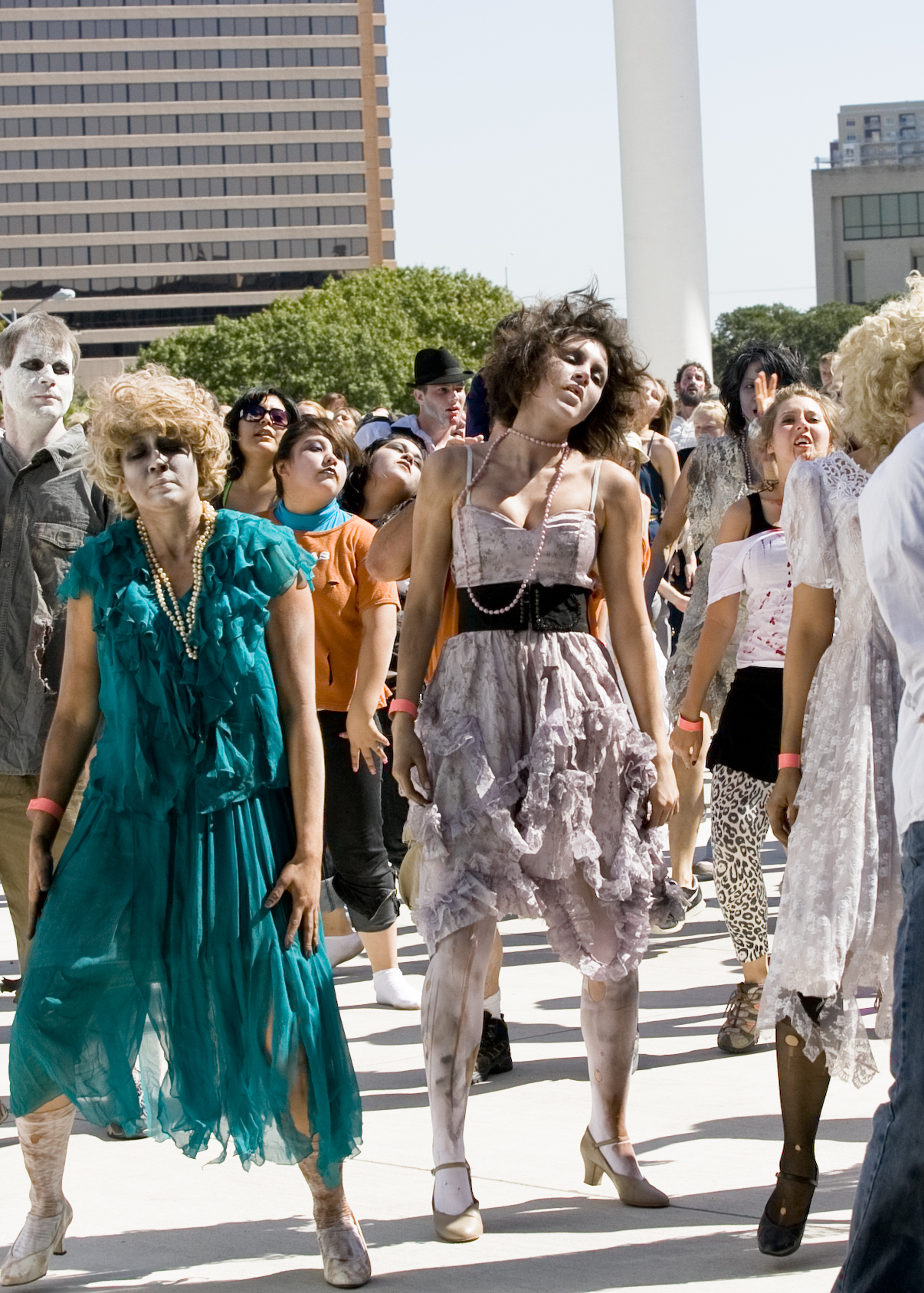
Zombie dancers at Thrill the World 2008 in Austin, Texas

Thrill the World is an annual international dance event and world record breaking attempt, in which participants simultaneously emulate the zombie dance seen in the music video of Michael Jackson's "Thriller", originally choreographed by Michael Peters and assisted by Vincent Paterson. The dancers perform in unison at locations throughout the world, and can range from kids and pre-teens to the elderly. Canadian dance instructor and entrepreneur Ines Markeljevic created the event "Thrill Toronto" where she taught a group of 62 zombies the dance in a mere couple of hours and they set the first Guinness World Records for Largest Thriller Dance in one location, at a community hall in Canada.

Following the Guinness World Record setting event in Toronto, Canada in 2006, Ines Markeljevic launched Thrill The World in 2007. 1,722 people in 80 cities from 17 countries participated in the event. Donations were made during the Irvine, California dance to the American Red Cross, who used the money to aid victims of the October 2007 California wildfires. The year after, Thrill the World returned for its second event, in which 91 venues from 13 countries participated. The event coincided with the 25th anniversary of Jackson's album Thriller. The event takes place every year on the Saturday preceding Halloween.

== Background ==
The idea to create an international event, in which participants simultaneously emulate the zombie dance in the music video of Michael Jackson's "Thriller", came about in 2006. At the time, a group of 62 zombies set a Guinness World Record for Largest Thriller Dance in one location, at a community hall in Canada. The event garnered worldwide attention. The world record, however, was subsequently broken, when 1722 people from 52 cities on five different continents emulated Jackson's zombie dance. The event—part-charity fundraiser, part-world record attempt—evolved into Thrill the World, one of the world's largest simultaneous dance events. Ines Markeljevic, a dance instructor, aimed to unite the world in dance and followed this event up with Thrill Toronto. The popularity of the event spread, and it visited Croatia, Honduras, New Zealand, the Philippines and Sierra Leone. The majority of people discovered Thrill the World through their official website and YouTube, where Markeljevic posted instructional step by step videos on the Thriller dance. Markeljevic stated that she chose Thriller because it has a special hold on people. "Regardless of where people are in the world, they love Thriller, they want to do the dance."

== Events ==
=== 2000s ===
On Sunday, October 29, 2006, Thrill Toronto's 62 zombies officially set the first Guinness World Record for "Largest Thriller Dance!" (in one location)

Thrill the World's official website expected the 2007 event to include 60 separate dancing events in 15 countries. On the day of the performance, October 27, 2007, it was revealed that 1,722 people in 80 cities from 17 countries had actually participated. The dancers in Irvine, California's event ranged from teenagers to women in their late 50s. One female participant danced to "Thriller" with her 4 ½-month daughter strapped to her waist. Another participant, 57-year-old Valerie Cardinal, wore a lime-green wig and scary makeup. "This is more fun than ballet", she proclaimed. "It's life affirming, even though it's about death." The Irvine event was organized by resident Tom Nguyen and dance instructor Jeremy Heckman. The pair arranged rehearsals and the main show in two weeks, upon hearing that a Canadian dance instructor was aiming for the "Largest Simultaneous Thriller Dance" world record. During the event, Nguyen and Heckman collected donations for the American Red Cross, which would then be used to aid victims of the October 2007 California wildfires. One of the wildfire victims, 26-year-old Kim Deans, participated in Irvine's "Thrill the World" event. At the time, Deans had been evacuated from her home and not allowed back. She later spoke of the escapism in performing at the event. "It's a break – a physical and mental break. It was either this or Disneyland."

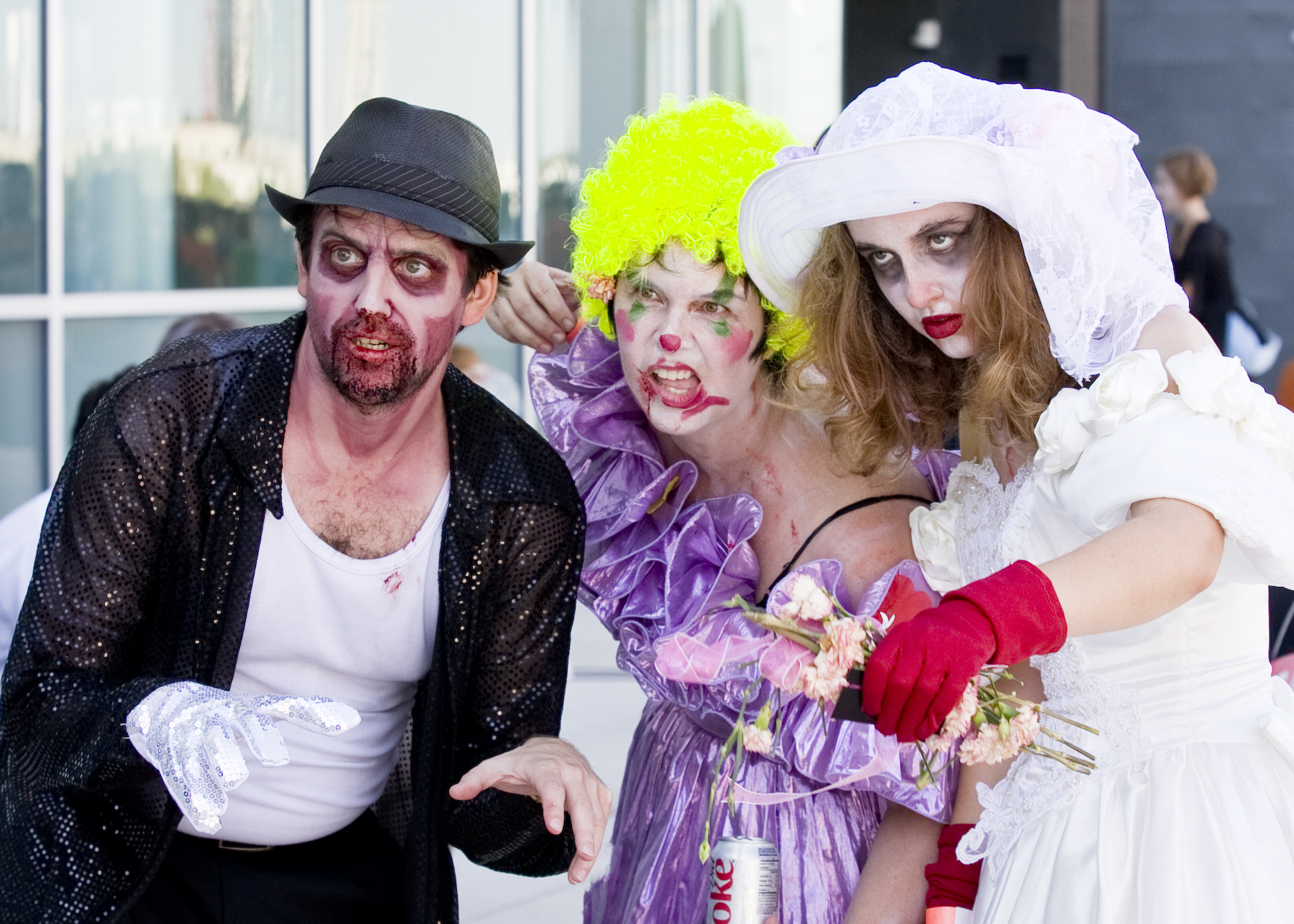
Thrill the World 2008 in Austin, Texas

4,179 people in 91 venues from 13 countries participated in the 2008 Thrill the World dance. Thrill the World 2008 featured Australia participating for the first time. Their Brisbane event was coordinated by Andrew Curnock, a Queensland University of Technology tutor and gaming software sound engineer. The tutor sought to have Australia join the dance event after watching a viral video of prison inmates dancing to "Thriller". "We basically came across that viral video that featured a bunch of (prison) inmates performing the Thriller dance", Curnock revealed. "One YouTube clip really just led to another and that's how we found out about Thrill the World and recognised the potential to get involved locally." Participants went through weeks of dance classes and costume preparation before the event, although Curnock added that those involved didn't have to be great dancers. "It's more about getting out there and getting involved." Curnock stated that he hoped Thrill the World wouldn't be a passing fad for Brisbane, but would be a permanent fixture on their social calendar.

The 2008 event, which coincided with the 25th anniversary of Thriller, also had Austin, Texas participate in their record break attempt. Texan artist Shawn Sides oversaw the rehearsals for the Austin dance. Some classes drew more than 200 people at a time. Sides became interested in the event after watching a commercial featuring lizards emulating the Thriller choreography. "I realized that Thriller is like the national choreography of the United States", Sides explained. "I'm so excited that there's this choreography in the world that our entire nation recognizes." Indiana Adams, who also helped with the Austin dance, remembered being so obsessed with Thriller as a child that she started to tell people her mother had been one of the zombies in the video. "It was just the most amazing choreography a 4-year-old had ever seen", Adams added. Although only in its third year, it marked the final Thrill event to take place during Jackson's lifetime.

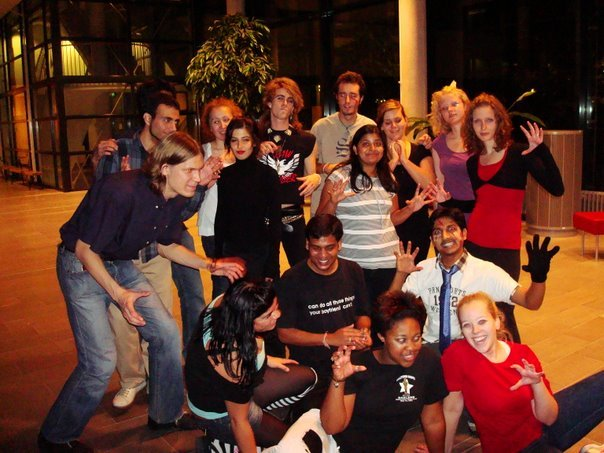
Thrill the World 2009 in Västerås, Sweden

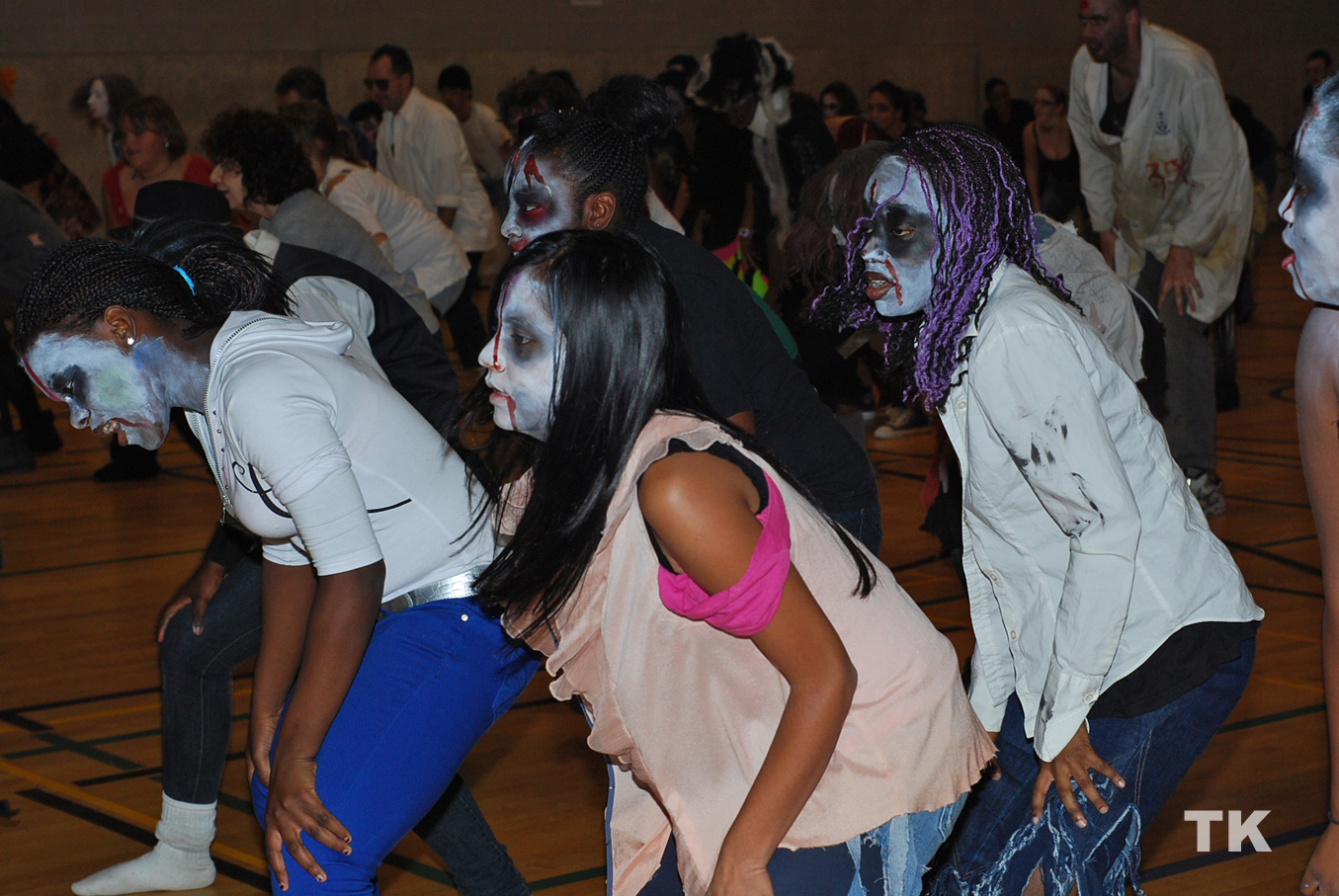
Thrill the World 2009 in Toronto, Ontario

Thrill the World 2009 was performed on October 24/25. There were a total of 22,923 participants, in 264 cities from 33 countries, setting a new world record.

The event raised considerable publicity across most forms of media, including TV, radio, online and print. The events raised over US$100,000 for 80 charities. It was first Thrill the World event to take place after Jackson's death.

=== 2010 to present ===
Thrill the World 2010 took place on Saturday October 23, with two events taking place, 12 hours apart, to avoid the problem of some countries having unsociable hours. There were a total of 13,042 zombies participating in 221 events around the world.

Thrill Day was October 29, 2011 at 2 p.m. and 2 a.m. UTC. There were 227 events, which raised money for the victims of the 2011 Van earthquake.

On October 27, 2012, around 9,450 dancers took part in 174 locations, raising money for causes such as the NSPCC, SOS Children's Villages and Animal Aid.

The 2013 event took place at 9 p.m. UTC on October 26. There were 6,451 zombies at 134 events in 22 countries, raising funds of over $68,000 plus food/clothing/charitable donations.

The event took place on October 25, 2014, at 10 p.m. UTC.

The event took place on Saturday, October 24 at 10 p.m. UTC.

== Events inspired by Thrill the World ==
On June 6, 2011, an organized flashmob "Thriller" dance was performed in front of the presidential palace of La Moneda in Santiago, Chile as a peaceful protest against the government's education policies. The demonstrators dressed as zombies and other creatures inspired by the original Michael Jackson video. The Thrill the World-inspired event caught the attention of the international press. The event was also intended to demonstrate that it is possible to protest without violence.
