= Thriller jacket =

Jacket worn by Michael Jackson in the Thriller music video

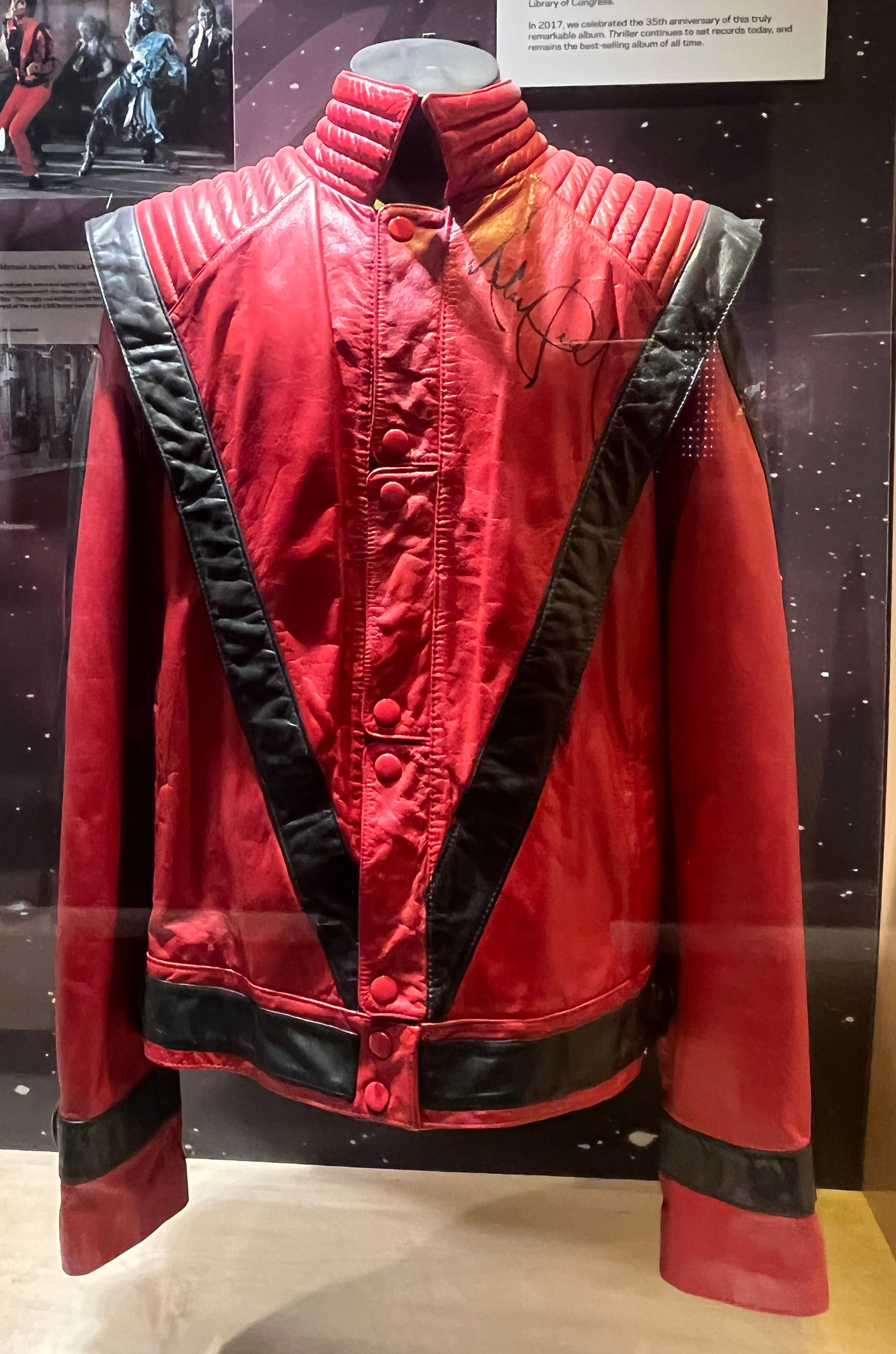
The Thriller jacket at the Grammy Museum

The Thriller jacket is the red jacket worn by Michael Jackson in the music video for his 1983 hit "Thriller". Designed by Deborah Nadoolman Landis, the candy-apple-red jacket featured black stripes and raised shoulders forming an inverted triangle. The jacket became the "hottest outerwear fad of the mid-1980s" and was widely emulated. Because counterfeit copies of the jacket could sell at over $500, in 1984 Jackson filed a lawsuit in New York City to prevent unauthorized copies of the jacket and his other merchandise.

On 27 June 2011, the jacket sold for $1.8 million at Julien's Auctions. The buyer, Milton Verret, described the jacket as "the greatest piece of rock and roll memorabilia in history". The proceeds from the jacket were donated to the Shambala Animal Kingdom, where Jackson's Bengal tigers were housed when he left Neverland Ranch in 2006.

== Design ==
The jacket was designed by Deborah Nadoolman Landis, and made in a tannery in Solofra, in the province of Avellino. She had also designed Indiana Jones' jacket in Raiders of the Lost Ark, among other things. The red jacket was noted for its V-shaped black stripes, the unusual style of the front buttons, and the angular, rigid shoulders protruding out over the tops of the arms. These characteristics of the jacket had the goal of enhancing Jackson's frame. At 25 years old, Landis states Michael Jackson weighed only 99 pounds and had a 26-inch waist, so the shape was specifically designed for him to seem larger and more "virile" on camera. Deborah Landis also particularly chose for the jacket to be red to help him "pop" in front of the ghouls and in the dark scenery.

== Production Variants ==
For the iconic music video in 1983, there were actually two variants of the Thriller jacket. One of them was a clean, perfect jacket, and it was used for dialogue scenes in the video. This version was sold for close to $2 million at auction. The other variant was purposely scuffed and torn up for when Jackson turns into a zombie, which is owned by the Michael Jackson estate. In addition to the two jackets created for the music video, there was a third variant that was redesigned for the planned This Is It concert residency in 2009. However, the concert was canceled due to Michael Jackson's death. Fashion designer Zaldy was responsible for the redesign of the jacket, featuring an imitation of blood on the shoulders along with a stamp on the inside resembling the beast Jackson turns into.

== Reception ==
Jackson wearing the Thriller jacket

The jacket became the "hottest outerwear fad of the mid-1980s" and was widely emulated. It is sometimes emulated by celebrities today such as Chris Brown and Kanye West. It also became one of the most sought after by many people and the epitome of the 1980s teen cool. The jacket he wore in the Thriller video, along with a copy of the black and white leather jacket he wore in one of the Pepsi commercials and in the dance rehearsal portions behinds the scenes of The Making of Michael Jackson's Thriller, are among his best-selling jackets. Expensive counterfeits were mass-produced and often sold for over $500 to people thinking they were getting the real thing. Because of this mass counterfeiting and the profits it earned, in 1984 Jackson filed a lawsuit in New York City to prevent unauthorized copies of the jacket and his other merchandise.

== Leaving Neverland ==
In the 2019 documentary Leaving Neverland, choreographer Wade Robson, burns Jackson memorabilia including a Thriller jacket. Director Dan Reed said that the jacket was genuine, but Robson claimed that it was custom-made for his childhood performances. According to auction house Julien's Auctions, in 2011 Robson sold a jacket from "Thriller" for $49,920. The actual jacket was owned by the Verret family in Austin, Texas, and was added temporarily to the Rock and Roll Hall of Fame in Cleveland, Ohio, in May, 2022, under "high security" surveillance.
