= Michael Jackson's Thriller (music video) =

1983 music video

- Title card
- Directed by: John Landis
- Written by: John Landis; Michael Jackson
- Produced by: George Folsey Jr.; Michael Jackson; John Landis
- Starring: Michael Jackson; Ola Ray
- Narrated by: Vincent Price
- Cinematography: Robert Paynter
- Edited by: Malcolm Campbell; George Folsey Jr.
- Music by: Elmer Bernstein; Rod Temperton; Michael Jackson
- Production companies: MJJ Productions; Optimum Productions
- Distributed by: Epic Records; Sony Music Entertainment
- Release date: December 2, 1983
- Running time: 14 minutes
- Country: United States
- Language: English
- Budget: $500,000

Michael Jackson's Thriller is the music video for the song "Thriller" by the American singer Michael Jackson, released on December 2, 1983. It was directed by John Landis, written by Jackson and Landis, and stars Jackson and Ola Ray. It references numerous horror films and has Jackson dancing with a horde of zombies.

Jackson's sixth album, Thriller, was released in November 1982 and spent months at the top of the Billboard 200, backed by successful videos for the singles "Billie Jean" and "Beat It". In July 1983, after Thriller was displaced from the top of the chart, Jackson and his team decided to release "Thriller" as a single. Jackson hired Landis to direct the video after seeing his 1981 film An American Werewolf in London. It was filmed at various locations in Los Angeles, including the Palace Theater, with a budget much larger than previous music videos. A making-of documentary, Making Michael Jackson's Thriller, was produced to sell to television networks.

Michael Jackson's Thriller was launched to great anticipation and played regularly on MTV. It doubled sales of Thriller, helping it become the best-selling album in history, and the documentary sold over a million copies, becoming the best-selling VHS tape at the time. "Thriller" is credited for transforming music videos into a serious art form, breaking down racial barriers in popular entertainment, popularizing the making-of documentary format and driving home video sales. The success made Jackson a dominant force in global pop culture.

Michael Jackson's Thriller has been named the greatest music video by various publications and readers' polls. It is closely associated with Halloween, and fans worldwide re-enact its zombie dance. Many elements have had a lasting impact on popular culture, such as the zombie dance and Jackson's red jacket, designed by Landis's wife, Deborah Nadoolman. In 2009, Thriller became the first music video selected for preservation in the US National Film Registry by the Library of Congress, which described it as the most famous music video of all time. It reached one billion views on YouTube in 2024.

== Plot ==
Jackson dancing with zombies in the video

In the 1950s, Michael Jackson and Ola Ray run out of gas while driving in a wooded area. They walk into the forest and Ray accepts Jackson's invitation to be his girlfriend. He warns her that he is "not like other guys", transforms into a werecat and attacks her.

In the present, Jackson and Ray are watching the werecat film in a theater. Ray leaves, scared by the film. Walking down a street at night, Jackson teases her by performing the verses of "Thriller". They pass a graveyard, where zombies rise from their graves and surround them in the street. Jackson becomes a zombie and dances with the horde, performing the choruses of the song.

Jackson and the zombies chase Ray into an abandoned house. She screams and wakes up, realizing it was a nightmare. Jackson embraces her and takes her home, but looks at the camera and grins, revealing his werecat eyes.

== Horror elements ==
The Thriller video makes many allusions to horror films. The opening scene parodies 1950s B-movies, with Jackson and Ray dressed as 1950s teenagers. The metamorphosis of the polite "boy next door" into a werecat has been interpreted as a depiction of male sexuality as bestial, predatory and aggressive. The critic Kobena Mercer found similarities to the werewolf in The Company of Wolves (1984).

The zombie dance sequence corresponds with the lyric about a masquerade ball of the dead. Jackson's makeup casts "a ghostly pallor" over his skin and emphasizes the outline of his skull, an allusion to the mask from The Phantom of the Opera (1925). According to the academic Peter Dendle, the zombie invasion sequence was inspired by Night of the Living Dead (1968) and captures the feelings of claustrophobia and helplessness essential to zombie films.

== Development ==
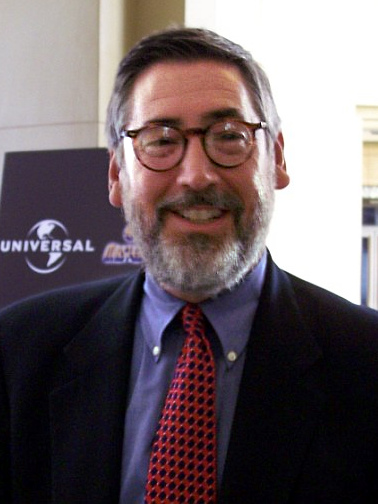
John Landis (pictured in 2005) directed the video.

Jackson's album Thriller was released in November 1982 on Epic Records and spent months at the top of the Billboard 200. It was backed by successful music videos for the singles "Billie Jean" and "Beat It", which are credited for raising creative standards for music videos and demonstrating their promotional power.

In June 1983, Thriller was displaced from the top of the Billboard 200 chart by the Flashdance soundtrack. It briefly regained the position in July, before being displaced by Synchronicity by the Police. Jackson urged the Epic executives Walter Yetnikoff and Larry Stessel to help conceive a plan to return the album to the top of the charts.

The horror-themed "Thriller" was not planned for release as a single. Epic saw it as a novelty song; Yetnikoff asked, "Who wants a single about monsters?" Jackson's manager, Frank DiLeo, suggested making a music video, and recalled telling Jackson: "It's simple—all you've got to do is dance, sing, and make it scary." According to Vanity Fair, Jackson preferred "benign Disney-esque fantasies where people were nice and children were safe", which ensured the video would be "creepy-comical, not genuinely terrifying".

In early August, after seeing his horror film An American Werewolf in London (1981), Jackson contacted the director John Landis. At the time, commercial directors did not direct music videos, but Landis was intrigued. He wanted to make a theatrical short rather than a standard music video, and hoped to use Jackson's celebrity to return theatrical shorts to popularity. Landis and Jackson conceived a short film shot on 35mm film with the production values of a feature film, with a budget of $900,000, much larger than any previous music video. Landis said the final video cost $500,000, around 10 times more than the average music video at the time.

=== Funding ===
According to Landis, when he called Yetnikoff to propose the film, he swore so loudly he had to remove the phone from his ear. Epic had little interest in making another video for Thriller, believing it had peaked, and agreed to contribute only $100,000. Initially, television networks refused to finance the project, sharing the view that Thriller was "last year's news". MTV, which had found success with Jackson's earlier videos, had a policy of not financing music videos, instead expecting record companies to pay for them. However, after the new channel Showtime agreed to pay half the budget, MTV agreed to pay the rest, justifying the expenditure as financing for a motion picture and not a music video.

To help finance the production, Landis's producer, George Folsey Jr., suggested a making-of documentary that, combined with the "Thriller" video, would produce an hour-long film that could be sold to television. The documentary, Making Michael Jackson's Thriller, was directed by Jerry Kramer. It includes home video footage of a young Jackson dancing and footage of his performances from The Ed Sullivan Show and Motown 25: Yesterday, Today, Forever. MTV paid $250,000 for the exclusive rights to show the documentary; Showtime paid $300,000 for pay-cable rights. Jackson covered additional costs, for which he was reimbursed. Vestron Music Video offered to distribute Making Michael Jackson's Thriller on VHS and Betamax; this was a pioneering concept, as most video cassettes at the time were sold to rental stores rather than directly to viewers. Vestron paid an additional $500,000 to market the cassettes.

== Production ==
=== Makeup and wardrobe ===
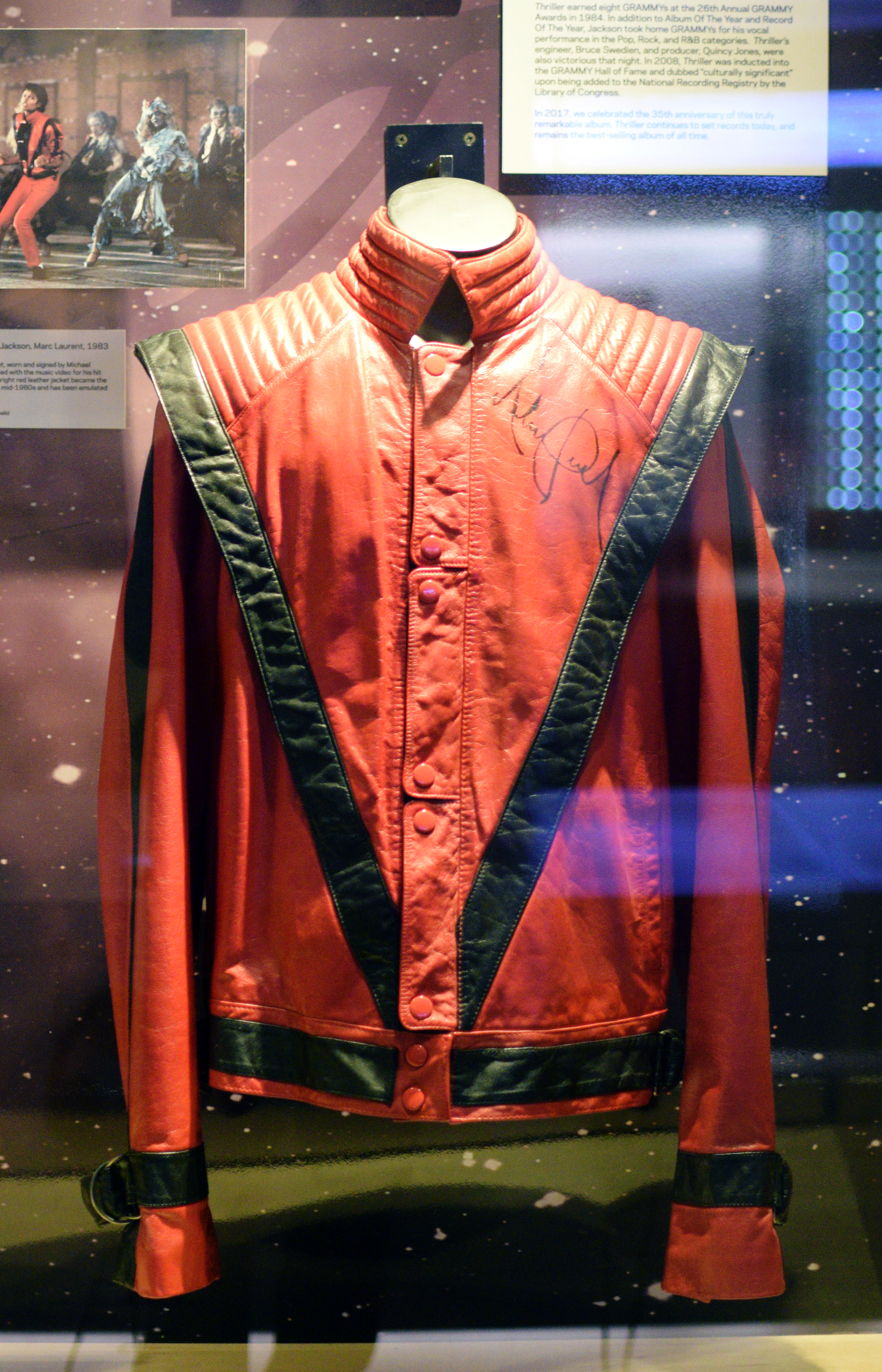
The jacket worn by Jackson

Jackson wanted to make a video in which he transformed into a four-legged beast, similarly to the transformation scene in An American Werewolf in London. This idea was replaced with a two-legged monster, as this made it easier for him to dance. Landis felt Jackson should become scary and creepy, but not ugly. He suggested that Jackson should become a werewolf in a 1950s setting, inspired by the 1957 film I Was a Teenage Werewolf. The makeup artist Rick Baker decided to turn Jackson into a werecat as he did not want to create another werewolf. He initially imagined the werecat would resemble a black panther, but added a longer mane and larger ears.

According to Landis, the production involved the largest makeup team in film history up to that point, with 40 makeup artists. His wife, Deborah Nadoolman, who had recently worked on the film Raiders of the Lost Ark (1981), designed the costumes, including Jackson's red jacket. She dressed Jackson in "hip", casual clothes that would be comfortable to dance in. She used red to contrast with the night setting and dark palette, and used the same color for Jackson's jeans to make him appear taller.

=== Casting ===
Thriller was the first time Jackson had interacted with a woman in a video, which Landis described as a "breakthrough". Jennifer Beals turned down an offer to play Jackson's girlfriend. According to Landis, Ola Ray, a former Playboy Playmate, was cast as she was "crazy for Michael" and had a "great smile". Landis encouraged Jackson and Ray to improvise during their scenes, and urged Jackson to act "sexy" and "show virility" for his female fans. According to Ray, the chemistry between them was real and they shared "intimate moments" during the shoot.

=== Filming ===
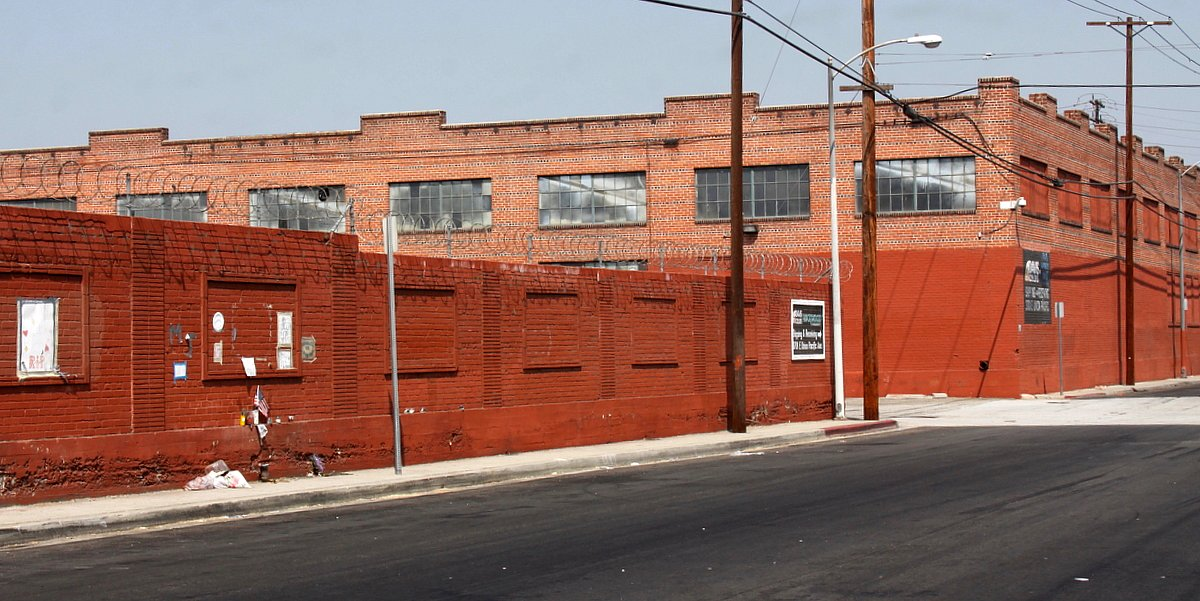
3701 East Union Pacific Avenue in Boyle Heights, Los Angeles, where the zombie dance was filmed

Thriller was filmed at the Palace Theatre in downtown Los Angeles, the junction of Union Pacific Avenue and South Calzona Street in the Boyle Heights neighborhood (for the zombie scene), and 1345 Carroll Avenue in the Angeleno Heights neighborhood of Echo Park (for the final house scene). The director of photography was Robert Paynter, who had worked with Landis on Trading Places. The zombie dance was choreographed by Michael Peters, who had choreographed the "Beat It" video.

Landis said directing Jackson was "like dealing with a gifted 10-year-old". He described Jackson as "emotionally damaged ... He was tortured, but he was happy-go-lucky for a lot of it. He worked very hard. He really was childlike." Entertainment figures including Marlon Brando, Fred Astaire, Rock Hudson and Jackie Kennedy Onassis visited the set, along with Jackson's parents, Joseph and Katherine Jackson. According to Landis, Michael asked Joseph to be removed, but he refused and was escorted off the set by police; Joseph denied this.

=== Jehovah's Witnesses dispute ===
Weeks before the premiere, Jackson, then a Jehovah's Witness, was told by organization leaders that the music video promoted demonology and that he would be excommunicated. Jackson called his lawyer, John Branca, and ordered him to destroy the negatives. The production team agreed to protect the negatives and locked them in Branca's office. Branca mollified Jackson by suggesting they include a disclaimer at the start of the video stating that it did not reflect Jackson's personal convictions.

In a statement published in Awake!, a magazine published by the Watch Tower Bible and Tract Society of Pennsylvania, Jackson said: "I just intended to do a good, fun short film, not to purposely bring to the screen something to scare people or to do anything bad. I want to do what's right. I would never do anything like that again." He said he had blocked further distribution and promotion of the film where he had been able. In 2001, Jackson said he remained a Jehovah's Witness, and the versions of the video on YouTube retains his disclaimer that it "in no way endorses a belief in the occult". However, according to multiple sources, Jackson ceased actively participating in church in 1987 after the video controversy.

== Release and reception ==
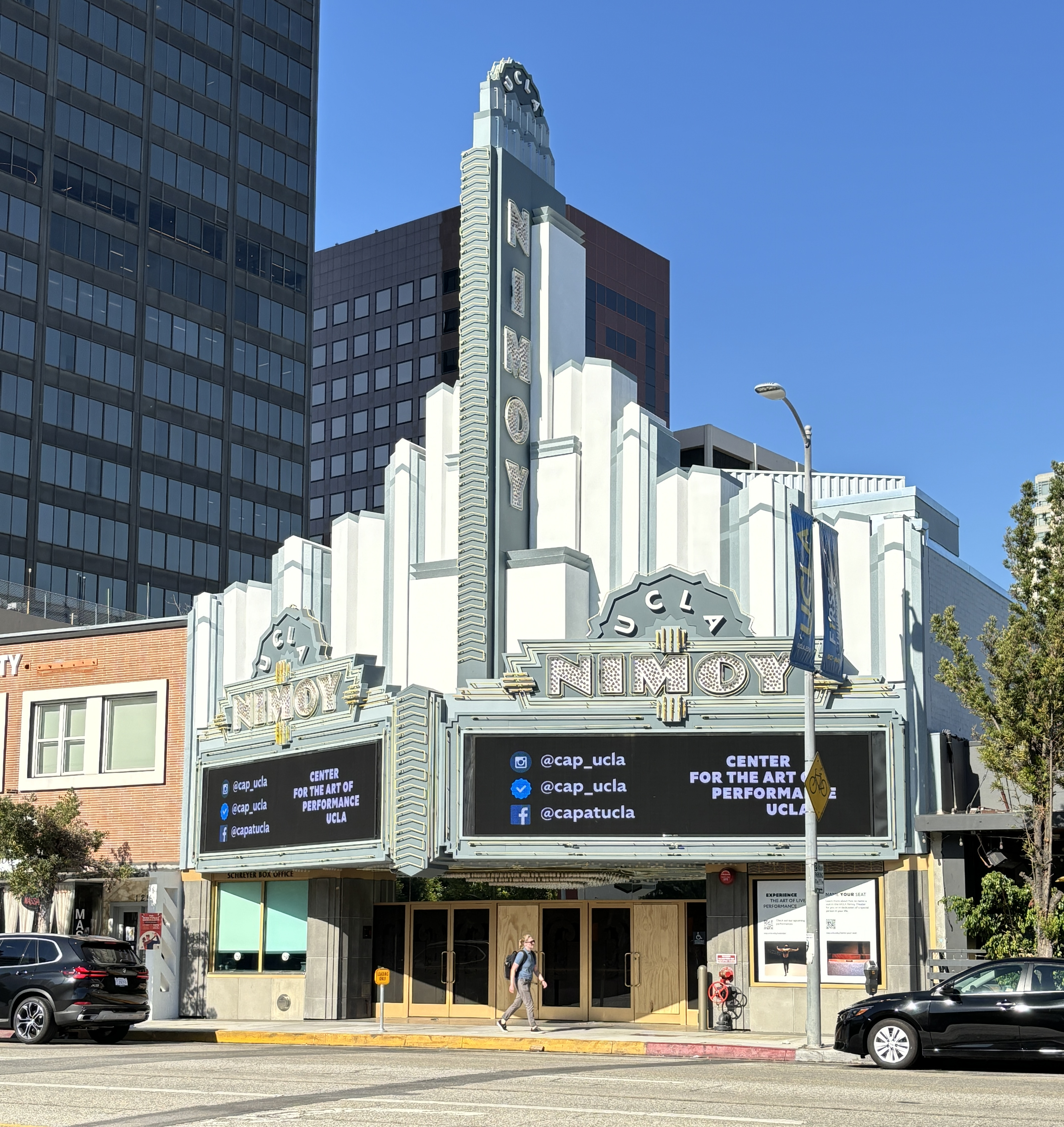
The Los Angeles Nimoy Theater, formerly known as the Crest Theater, where Michael Jackson's Thriller premiered in 1983

On November 14, 1983, Thriller was shown to a private audience at the Crest Theater in Los Angeles. In attendance were celebrities including Diana Ross, Warren Beatty, Prince and Eddie Murphy. Jackson stayed in the projection booth, declining Ray's invitation to join the audience. The audience gave the film a standing ovation. At Murphy's insistence, it was played again.

The video debuted on MTV alongside the documentary Making Michael Jackson's Thriller on December 2, 1983. After each broadcast, MTV advertised when they would next play it, and recorded audience figures ten times the norm. Showtime aired the video six times in February. Within months, Making Michael Jackson's Thriller sold a million copies on VHS, more than any prior video release. It went on to sell up to 10 million copies.

As films required theatrical screenings to be eligible for Academy Awards, Landis had the video played before screenings of Fantasia (1940) at a Los Angeles cinema, though it was not nominated. The film critics Gene Siskel and Roger Ebert both gave the video a "thumbs down", criticizing its horror tropes.

The video doubled sales of the Thriller album, which sold a million copies a week following the video debut and became the bestselling album of all time. At the 1984 MTV Video Music Awards, Thriller won the awards for Viewers Choice, Best Overall Performance and Best Choreography, and was nominated for Best Concept Video, Best Male Video and Video of the Year. The success transformed Jackson into a dominant force in global pop culture, and cemented his status as the "king of pop". According to Landis, the response was "a surprise to everyone but Michael".

In 1984, the National Coalition on Television Violence reviewed 200 MTV videos and classified more than half as too violent, including Michael Jackson's Thriller. The chairman, Thomas Radecki, said: "It's not hard to imagine young viewers after seeing Thriller saying, 'Gee, if Michael Jackson can terrorize his girlfriend, why can't I do it too?'"

=== Legacy ===
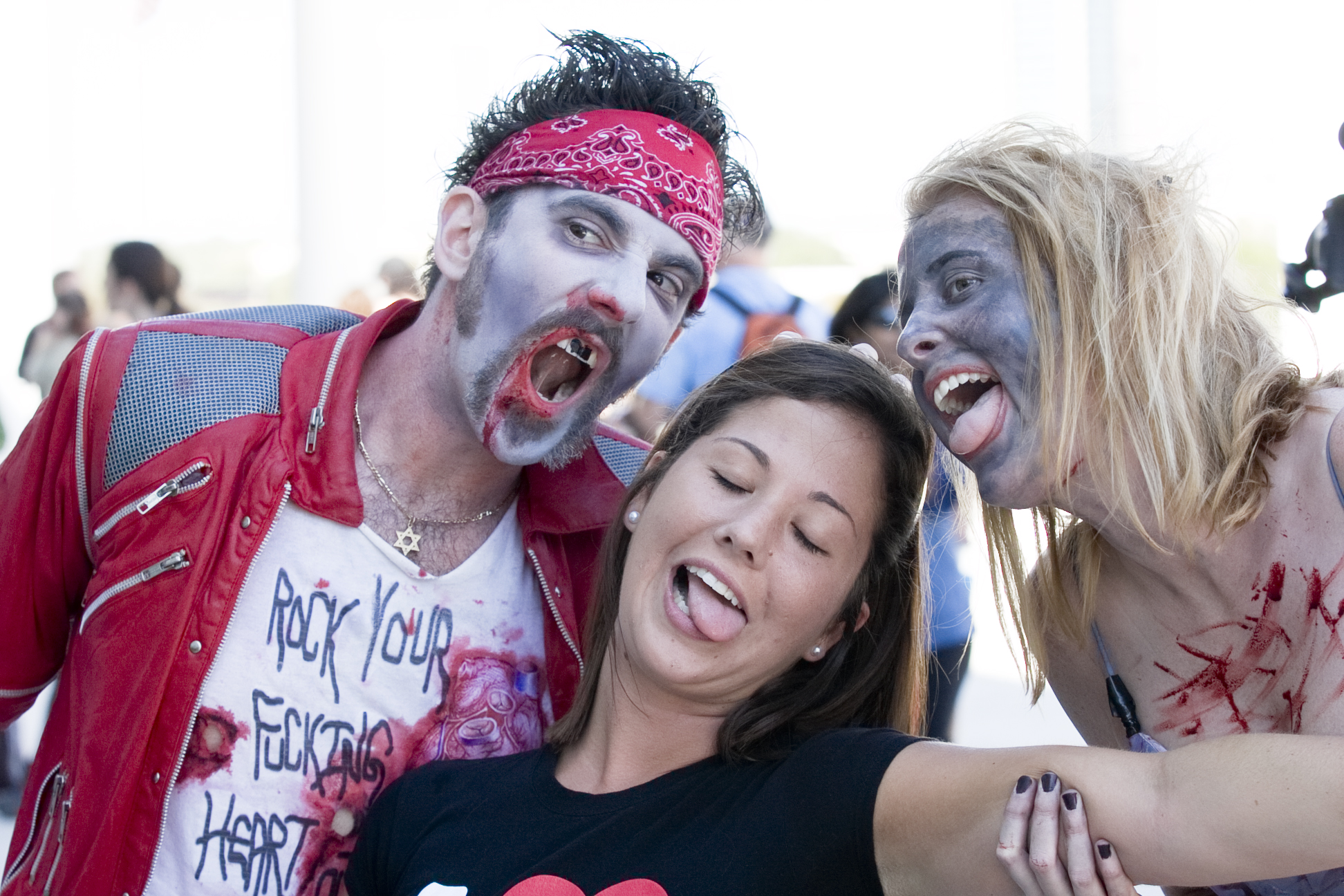
Participants of the 2008 Thrill the World event in Austin, Texas

The Thriller video sealed MTV's position as a major cultural force, helped disassemble racial barriers for black artists, revolutionized music video production, popularized making-of documentaries, and drove rentals and sales of VHS tapes. Gil Kaufman of MTV described it as iconic and one of Jackson's most enduring legacies. He said it was the "mini-movie that revolutionized music videos" and "cemented Jackson's status as one of the most ambitious, innovative pop stars of all time".

The director Spike Jonze described Thriller as a touchpoint for his work, and the music video director Brian Grant credited it as the turning point when music videos became a "proper industry". The British director Trudy Bellinger said prior videos had been more "performance-based", whereas "Thriller" was more cinematic. Nina Blackwood, a former MTV executive, said music videos improved after Thriller, with more storylines and more intricate choreography; by comparison, earlier videos appeared "shockingly bad".

Michael Jackson's Thriller was named the greatest video by MTV in 1999, by VH1 in 2001, and by Time in 2011. Vinny Marino of ABC News said the video's selection by VH1 was a "no-brainer", and that it "continues to be considered the greatest video ever by just about everyone". In 2009, Michael Jackson's Thriller became the first music video to be selected for the National Film Registry by the Library of Congress, which described it as "the most famous music video of all time". The National Film Preservation Board coordinator, Steve Legett, said it had been considered for induction for years, but was chosen mainly due to Jackson's death that year. In a poll of more than 1,000 people conducted by Myspace in 2010, it was voted the most influential music video.

Jackson's red leather jacket became a fashion icon and has been widely emulated. In 2011, one of the two jackets worn by Jackson in the video sold at auction for $1.8 million. The Thriller dance is performed in major cities around the world. The largest zombie dance included 12,937 dancers, in Mexico City. The annual Thrill the World event aims to have people in cities around the world perform the dance.

Michael Jackson's Thriller is popular on YouTube, which hosts reenactments of the dance. A YouTube video of more than 1,500 prisoners performing the dance attracted 14 million views by 2010. In September 2024, Michael Jackson's Thriller became the fourth Jackson video to reach one billion YouTube views after "Beat It", "Billie Jean" and "They Don't Care About Us".

== Rereleases and adaptations ==
In 2009, Jackson sold the Michael Jackson's Thriller rights to the Nederlander Organization, which planned to adapt it as a Broadway musical. In 2017, remastered versions of Thriller (in 3D) and the documentary were played at the 74th annual Venice Film Festival. That year, Thriller was also screened at the Toronto International Film Festival, followed by a US premiere at the Grauman's Chinese Theatre. In 2018, was remastered in IMAX 3D for a limited engagement, preceding screenings of The House With a Clock in Its Walls in North America for its first week. In 2024, Netflix, Universal Pictures and Illumination released an animated short, Sing: Thriller, that combines Thriller with characters from the animated film franchise Sing.

== Litigation ==
In January 2009, Landis sued Jackson in a dispute over royalties for the video, saying Jackson had failed to pay him 50% of the proceeds. The lawsuit was settled in 2012 for an undisclosed amount. In 2013, Landis said: "My deal was with Michael's company and Michael's company was mismanaged ... I was suing him for 14 years." Ray sued Jackson's estate for unpaid royalties in May 2009, one month before his death. In 2013, she settled for $75,000. The 2009 video game Plants vs. Zombies by PopCap Games contained enemies resembling the zombie Jackson until Jackson's estate objected in 2010.

== Accolades ==
=== Grammy Award ===
| Year | Category | Result | Notes |
|---|---|---|---|
| 1985 | Best Video Album | Won | Making Michael Jackson's Thriller |

=== MTV Video Music Award ===
| Year | Category | Result |
|---|---|---|
| 1984 | Best Overall Performance in a Video | Won |
| 1984 | Best Choreography (Michael Peters) | Won |
| 1984 | Viewer's Choice | Won |
| 1999 | 100 Greatest Music Videos of all Time | Won |

== See also ==
- List of most expensive music videos
- Thriller viral video featuring the CPDRC Dancing Inmates of Cebu Provincial Detention and Rehabilitation Center, Cebu, in the Cebu Province of the Philippines
- Donga, the "Indian Thriller" internet meme
- Michael Jackson's Ghosts
- Thrill the World

== Bibliography ==
- Dendle, Peter (2001), "Thriller", The Zombie Movie Encyclopedia, McFarland & Company, ISBN 978-0786455201
- Mercer, Kobena (1991), "Monster Metaphors: Notes on Michael Jackson's Thriller", in Gledhill, Christine (ed.), Stardom: Industry of Desire, Psychology Press, ISBN 978-0415052177
- Mercer, Kobena (2005), "Monster Metaphors: Notes on Michael Jackson's Thriller", in Frith, Simon; Goodwin, Andrew; Grossberg, Larence (eds.), Sound and Vision: The Music Video Reader, Routledge, ISBN 978-1134869237
