= Deborah Nadoolman Landis =

American film costume designer (born 1952)

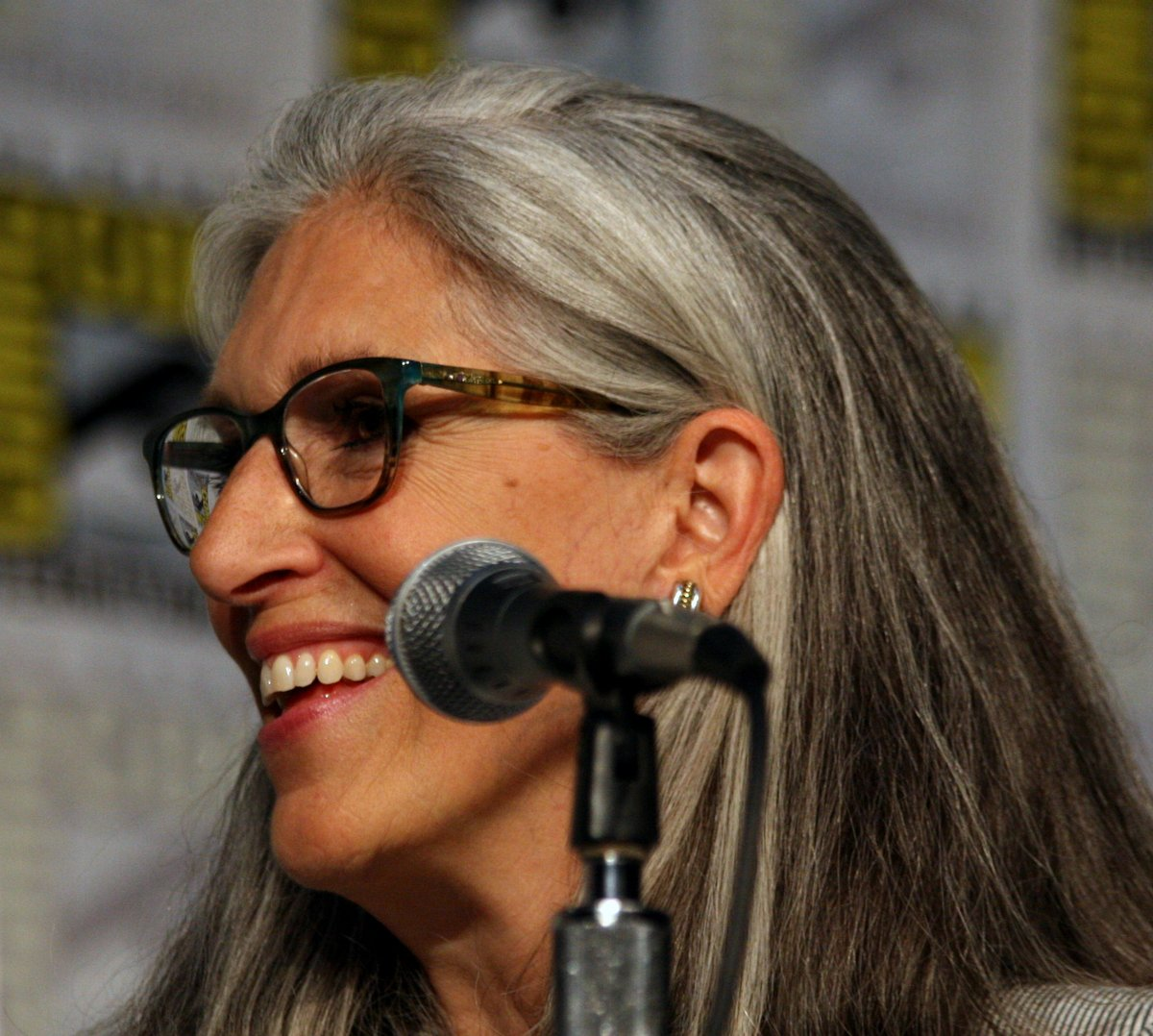
- Landis at San Diego Comic-Con in 2016
- Born: May 26, 1952 (age 74)
- Other name: Deborah Nadoolman
- Education: UCLA (MFA); Royal College of Art (PhD)
- Occupation: Costume designer
- Years active: 1977–2010
- Spouse: John Landis (m. 1980)
- Children: 2, including Max

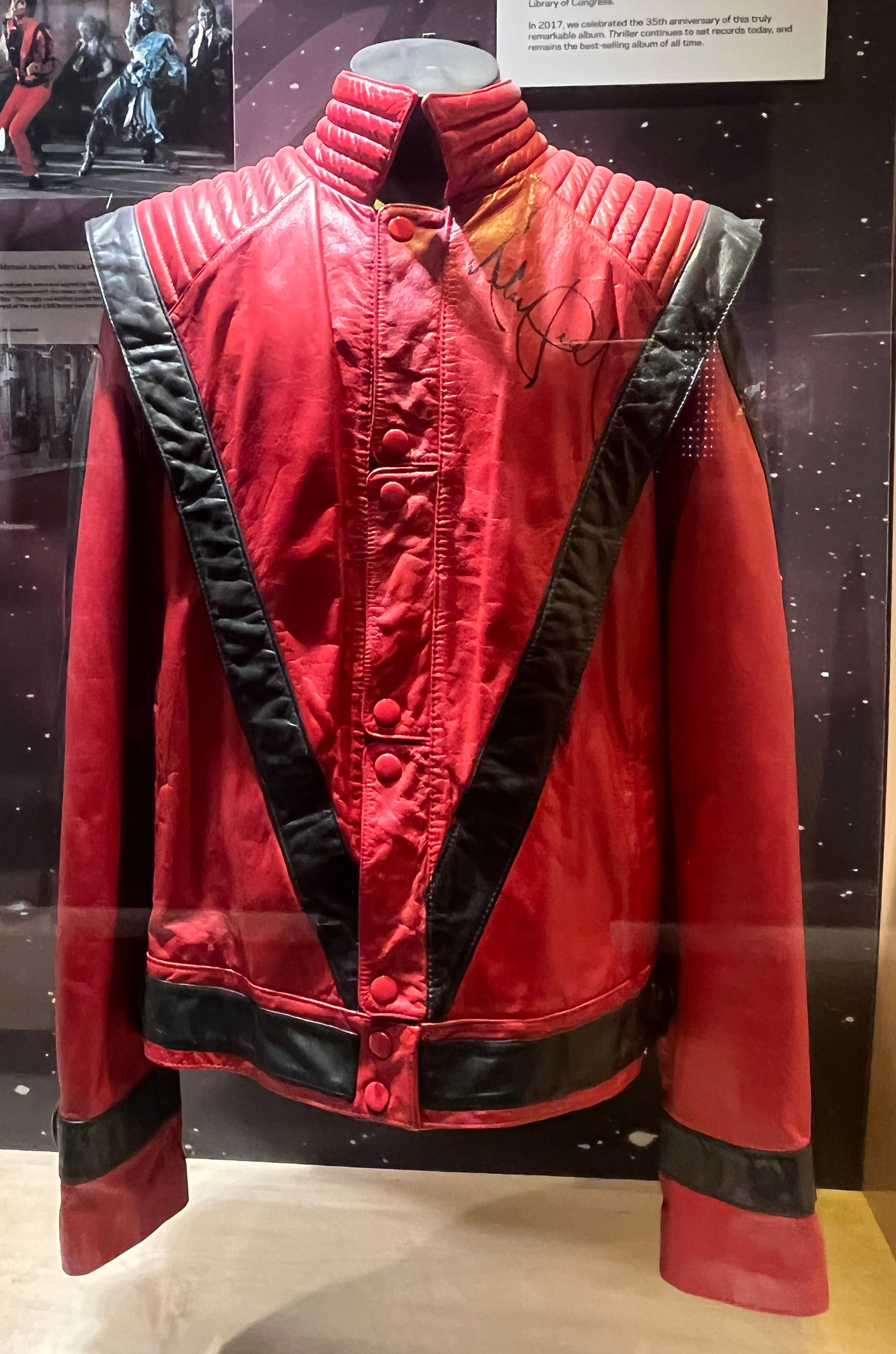
The Thriller jacket, designed by Landis, at the Grammy Museum

Deborah Nadoolman Landis (born May 26, 1952) is an American costume designer, author, and professor. She has worked on notable films such as Animal House, The Blues Brothers, Raiders of the Lost Ark and Three Amigos, all of which credited her as Deborah Nadoolman. Landis served two terms as president of the Costume Designers Guild of which she has been a member for more than thirty years. She is married to director John Landis; their son is screenwriter Max Landis.

== Biography ==
Born to a Jewish family, Landis graduated from UCLA with an M.F.A. in costume design in 1975. She earned a Ph.D. in history of design from the Royal College of Art in London. She has created a number of notable costumes, such as the fedora and jacket of Indiana Jones (Harrison Ford), the "college" sweatshirt worn by John "Bluto" Blutarsky (John Belushi), and Michael Jackson's red jacket in Thriller. In addition to Drama-Logue Awards for her theater designs, she was nominated for an Academy Award in 1988 for Coming to America.

After receiving her doctorate, Landis wrote and edited a number of books. "Hollywood Costume" (the V&A catalogue of the eponymous exhibition) is the Kraszna-Krausz Foundation's 2013 Moving Image Book Award winner.

Landis has lectured on costume design and has taught at the University of Southern California, the AFI Conservatory, and is a professor at the University of the Arts London. She was inducted as a Distinguished Alumna at the UCLA Department of Theater, Film and Television in 2005, and honored as a William Randolph Hearst Fellow at the University of Texas, Austin in 2006. In 2007, she served on the Cinefondation Jury at the 60th Cannes Film Festival. In 2009, Landis became the David C. Copley Chair and the Director of the David C. Copley Center of Costume Design at UCLA, School of Theater, Film & Television.

She is mentioned in "The 21-Second Excitation" episode of The Big Bang Theory for her work on Raiders of the Lost Ark and Michael Jackson's Thriller.

== Filmography ==
(credited as Deborah Nadoolman)

- The Kentucky Fried Movie (1977)
- Animal House (1978)
- 1941 (1979)
- The Blues Brothers (1980)
- Raiders of the Lost Ark (1981)
- An American Werewolf in London (1981)
- Trading Places (1983)
- Twilight Zone: The Movie (1983) (segment 1)
- Michael Jackson's Thriller (1983)
- Crackers (1984)
- Into the Night (1985/I)
- Spies Like Us (1985)
- Three Amigos (1986)
- Coming to America (1988) (Academy Award nomination)
- Nothing but Trouble (1991)
- Innocent Blood (1992)
- The Stupids (1996)
- Mad City (1997)
- Blues Brothers 2000 (1998)
- Susan's Plan (1998)
- Burke & Hare (2010)

== Bibliography ==
- Screencraft/Costume Design (Focal Press, 2003)
- Dressed: A Century of Hollywood Costume Design (HarperCollins, 2007)
- Hollywood Sketchbook: A Century of Costume Illustration (Harper Collins, 2012)
- FilmCraft: Costume Design (Focal Press, 2012)

Edited by Landis:

1. 50 Costumes/50 Designers: Concept to Character (University of California Press. 2004)
2. Hollywood Costume (V&A Publishing, 2012)
