= Michael Peters (choreographer) =

American choreographer, dancer (1948–1994)

- Portrait by Martha Swope, 1984 (Billy Rose Theatre Division T-VIM 2010-048, New York Public Library)
- Born: Michael Douglas Peters; August 6, 1948; Brooklyn, New York, U.S.
- Died: August 29, 1994 (aged 46); Los Angeles, California, U.S.
- Occupations: Choreographer; dancer; director
- Years active: 1970s−1994

Michael Douglas Peters (August 6, 1948 – August 29, 1994) was an American choreographer, dancer and director who is best known for his innovative choreography in music videos.

== Early years ==
Michael Peters was born on August 8, 1948 in Brooklyn, New York. At the age of four, his mother enrolled him in a dance class. Later on, Peters decided he wanted to be a professional dancer after he had watched the original Broadway production of West Side Story. He told the Chicago Tribune: "I came from a housing project in Brooklyn where there were gang wars, and as I watched something I could relate to translated into musical terms, I decided this was something I could do and that I wanted to do."

Peters attended the High School of Performing Arts in Manhattan, which he attended for four years. However, he disliked school and never graduated. Instead, Peters learned to dance at the Bernice Johnson Cultural Arts Center in Queens.

== Career ==
Peters started his career in modern dance. During the 1960s and 1970s, he worked with Talley Beatty, Alvin Ailey, and Bernice Johnson Reagon among others. In 1979, Peters was the choreographer for the Broadway musical Comin' Uptown, an all-Black version of Charles Dickens's A Christmas Carol, which starred Gregory Hines.

Peters choreographed some of the most memorable videos during the 1980s. His most well-known choreography work was for Michael Jackson's "Beat It", released in March 1983. For the music video, Peters taught choreography to nearly 80 real-life gang members who had no prior dance experience, filming in the Skid Row neighborhood of Los Angeles. He also appeared in the video as a rival gang leader dressed in white and wearing sunglasses. He collaborated again with Jackson and choreographed the dancing sequence for Michael Jackson's Thriller music video. Aside from his role as choreographer, Peters portrayed one of the zombies. In 1984, Peters was awarded the American Video Award for Best Choreography for "Beat It" and the MTV Video Music Award for Best Choreography for "Thriller".

Aside from his collaborations with Jackson, Peters choreographed Diana Ross's For One & For All Central Park concert in July 1983, in which he danced with Ross for the "Maniac" and "Pieces of Ice" numbers. He also choreographed Lionel Richie's music video for "Hello" and Pat Benatar's "Love Is a Battlefield."

In 1982, Peters was the co-recipient of the Tony Award for Best Choreography for Dreamgirls, along with Michael Bennett. He later directed his first Broadway musical Leader of the Pack, which was based on the life and songs of Ellie Greenwich. It premiered at the Ambassador Theatre on April 8, 1985. It closed on July 21, 1985 after 120 performances.

Peters won two Primetime Emmy Awards for the Liberty Weekend 1986 — Closing Ceremonies and The Jacksons: An American Dream (1992). Among his final credits was serving as choreographer for What's Love Got to Do with It (1993), which starred Angela Bassett as Tina Turner. Prior to production, Bassett endured intense physical preparation, working with Peters for 10 hours a day of cardio and dance training over a month to master Turner's signature stage movements.

== Death ==
On August 29, 1994, Peters died at his Los Angeles home from complications of AIDS.

== Awards and nominations ==
- 1982 Tony Award for Best Choreography – Dreamgirls
- 1987 Primetime Emmy Award for Outstanding Choreography – Liberty Weekend
- 1993 Primetime Emmy Award for Outstanding Choreography – The Jacksons: An American Dream
- 1994 American Choreography Award for Outstanding Achievement in a Feature Film – What's Love Got to Do with It
