= Midway on High =

Bar in Columbus, Ohio

General information
- Location: 1728 North High Street; Columbus, Ohio, United States
- Opened: 2012

Technical details
- Floor count: 2

Website
- https://midwayonhigh.com

Midway on High, also known as Midway Bar and Restaurant or simply Midway, is a bar located in Columbus, Ohio, adjacent to the main campus of Ohio State University. Directly across the street from the Ohio Union, the High Street bar has been open since 2012 and since its opening has been owned by local firm A&R Creative.

== History ==
=== Opening and first years ===
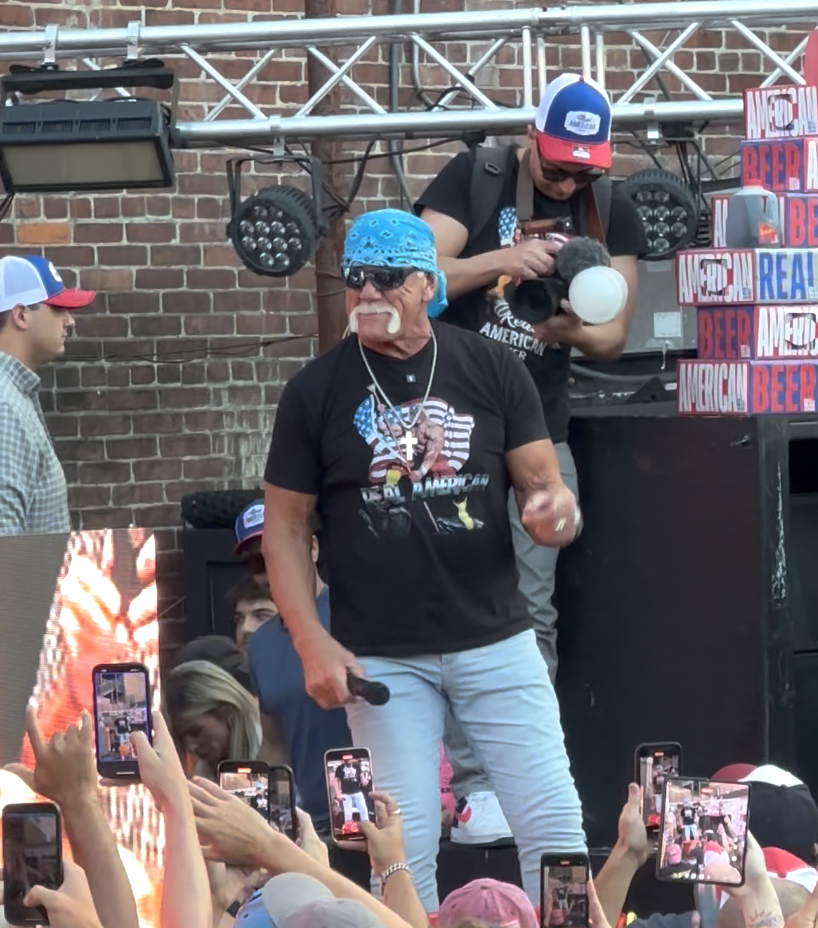
Hulk Hogan promoting Real American Beer at Midway in 2024

Midway was opened in January 2012 by Ali Alshahal, who set up A&R Creative to be the holding company for Midway. The bar was built on the site of Bento Go-Go, a bar and restaurant across the street from the Ohio Union and next door to the Newport Music Hall. A&R, which already managed the Fourth Street Tavern, was noted for having a good reputation among Ohio State students who spoke to The Lantern. Alshahal purchased the lot from Bento Go-Go for an undisclosed price, though the Franklin County auditors office valued the lot at $880,000 in 2012.

In its early days Midway was intended by Alshahal to be a training spot for his cooks to expand into other restaurants. He intended for these cooks to work for him at The Crest, another A&R restaurant then open.

Midway's entrance floor is located in a flood-prone area which has affected other local businesses. The bar's issues were covered during The Columbus Dispatch's reporting on the need for Ohio State and Columbus to install new drainage systems near and along High Street.

=== Violations and renovations ===
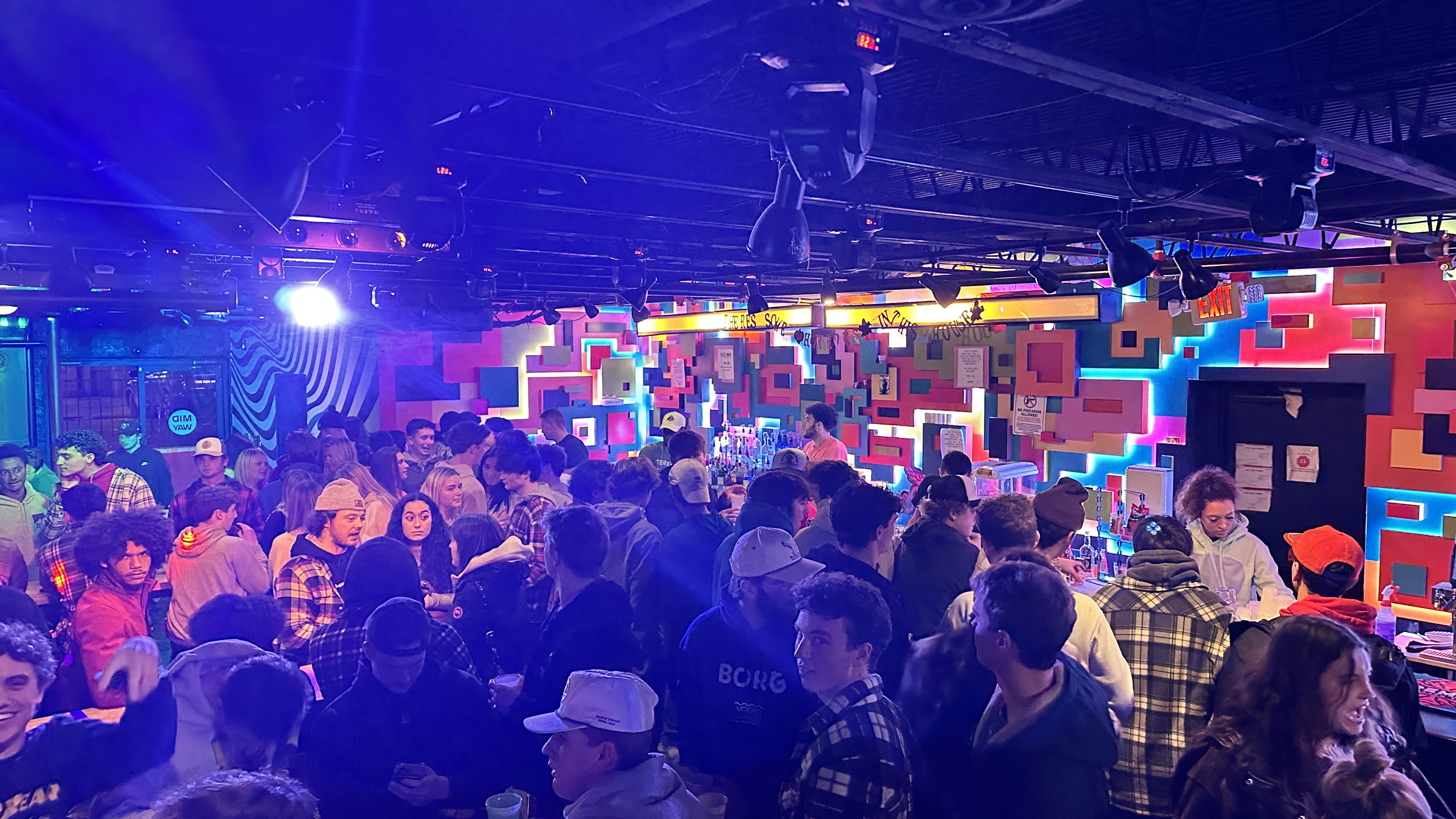
Midway's lower level during a crowded night

One of Midway's earlier controversies was in 2015, where the bar was noted for attracting various older individuals engaging in theft and other illegal activity at night amongst a mostly-student population. Midway's non-ideal demographics coming to the bar resulted in nearly 25 police reports at the location of the bar between 2014 and 2015. In response, Midway announced it would require student IDs in addition to driver's licenses for identification.

Through the early 2020s, Midway was consistently cited by the Columbus Division of Police for various violations, notably serving alcohol to persons under 21, robbery, and noise complaints. Midway also was cited during the COVID-19 pandemic for failing to comply with social distancing measures; on April 23, 2021, Midway received three citations for improper conduct, disorderly activity, and no posted permit on premises, all of which came in response to patrons of the bar flouting requirements for people inside the venue to wear face masks. The pandemic and Ohio State's shift to online learning contributed to A&R's revenue being cut by 75%.

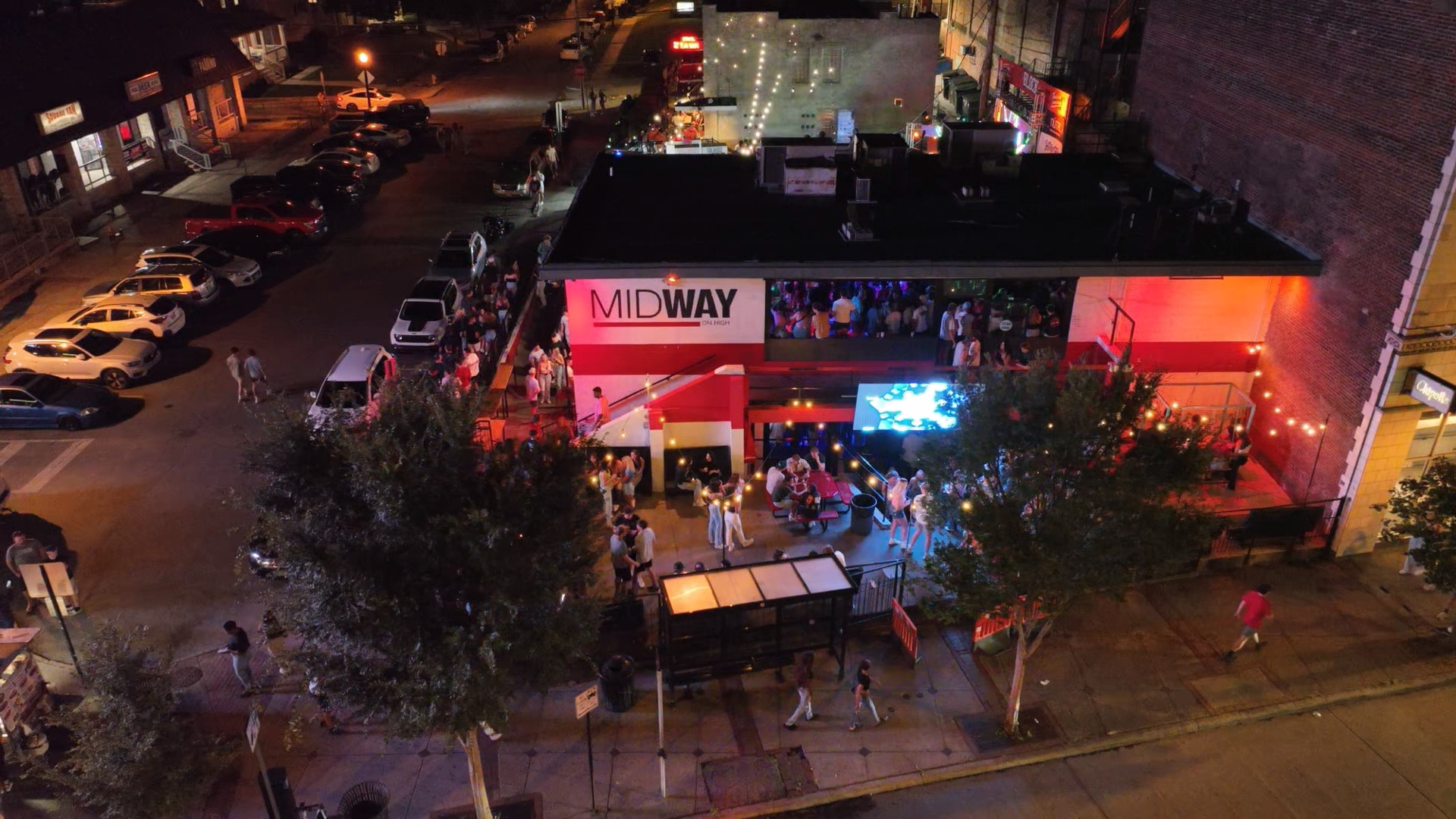
An aerial view of Midway

It was around this time that Midway also began renovating its space to become a more DJ-centric venue after A&R's closure of Trism, located two blocks to the south of Midway. Alshahal, long sitting on plans to remake Midway into a newer venue, partnered with What? Productions, the operators of the What Music and Arts Festival, to design the renovation. The upstairs bar had new LED screens built in, and was remade to look more like a stage.

2022 saw Midway almost lose its liquor license after another string of violations. A Columbus police commander who oversaw Midway's district, Dennis Jeffery, cited Midway 34 times from January 2020 to November 2021. A common complaint cited by Jeffery was the use of outdoor speakers after 11PM, which according to Jeffery Midway consistently violated. Midway refuted that Jeffery's accounts were inaccurate and that the bar should not be associated with other groups nearby the property engaging in illegal activity; A&R further hired local audio technicians to refute claims made against them that their music was being heard as far away as the Columbus suburb of Clintonville, complaints which residents of the northern Columbus neighborhood have made since 2018.

== Future ==
In August 2023, A&R unveiled a proposal to construct a new establishment at a parking lot in between Midway and fellow A&R property Ethyl & Tank. The 7,000 square foot project, dubbed the Block on 13th, was proposed by Alshahal's company to reduce crowding at both bars, give patrons a rooftop, and provide Ohio State student organizations an additional venue and establishment for events. Construction, if all approvals and permits are granted, is estimated to start in the spring and/or summer of 2024.

The proposal received criticism from commissioners on the University Impact District Review Board, who expressed concerns about the bar's previous noise-level complaints. To mitigate these concerns, A&R and project architect Tim Lai stated that the new building would include vinyl curtains and a fabric roof. The proposal eventually was recommended to the Columbus City Council in November, though still awaits full approval.
