= Hulk Hogan =

American professional wrestler (1953–2025)

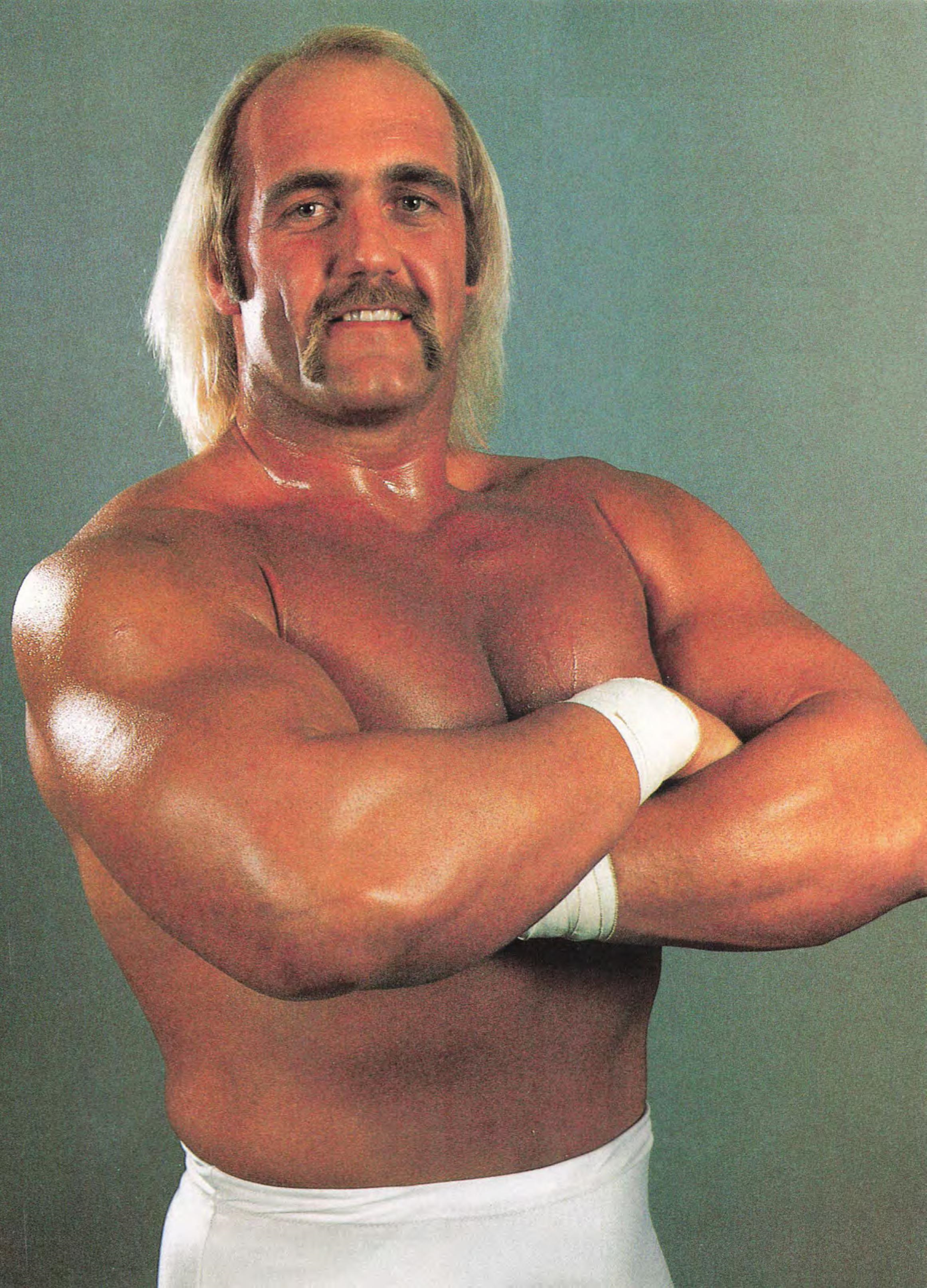
- Hogan in 1985
- Born: Terry Gene Bollea; August 11, 1953; Augusta, Georgia, U.S.
- Died: July 24, 2025 (aged 71); Clearwater, Florida, U.S.
- Occupations: Professional wrestler; television personality; actor; entrepreneur
- Years active: 1977–2025
- Spouses: Linda Claridge (m. 1983; div. 2009); Jennifer McDaniel (m. 2010; div. 2021); Sky Daily (m. 2023)
- Children: Brooke; Nick
- Relatives: Horace Hogan (nephew)
- Professional wrestling career
- Ring name(s): Hollywood Hogan; Hollywood Hulk Hogan; Hulk Boulder; Hulk Hogan; Hulk Machine; Mr. America; Sterling Golden; Terry Boulder; The Super Destroyer
- Billed height: 6 ft 7 in (201 cm)
- Billed weight: 302 lb (137 kg)
- Billed from: Hollywood, California (as Hollywood Hogan); Venice Beach, California (as Hulk Hogan); Washington, D.C. (as Mr. America)
- Trained by: Hiro Matsuda
- Debut: August 9, 1977
- Retired: January 27, 2012
- Website: hulkhogan.com

Terry Gene Bollea (/bəˈleɪə/; August 11, 1953 – July 24, 2025), better known by his ring name Hulk Hogan, was an American professional wrestler and media personality. Widely regarded as one of the greatest and most recognized wrestlers of all time, Hogan won multiple championships worldwide, most notably being a six-time WWF/WWE Champion. He is best known for his work in the World Wrestling Federation (WWF, now WWE) and World Championship Wrestling (WCW). Hogan also competed in promotions such as Total Nonstop Action Wrestling (TNA), the American Wrestling Association (AWA), and New Japan Pro-Wrestling (NJPW).

Known for his showmanship, large physique, trademark blond horseshoe moustache and bandanas, Hogan began training in 1977 with Championship Wrestling from Florida and achieved global stardom after joining the WWF in 1983. His heroic, all-American persona helped usher in the 1980s professional wrestling boom, during which he headlined eight of the first nine editions of WWF's flagship annual event WrestleMania and regularly headlined Saturday Night's Main Event. His first reign as WWF Champion lasted 1,474 days—the third-longest in the title's history (Note: During his first title reign, Bob Backlund lost the title to Antonio Inoki and regained it six days later, getting two reigns of 648 and 1,470 days; however, WWE does not recognize the title change and recognized Backlund's reigns with 2,135 days.)—and he became the first wrestler to win back-to-back Royal Rumbles in 1990 and 1991.

In 1994, Hogan joined WCW and won the WCW World Heavyweight Championship six times. His reinvention as the villainous Hollywood Hogan and leadership of the New World Order (nWo) revitalized his career and significantly contributed to the success of the "Monday Night War" wrestling boom of the mid-late 1990s, including three headline appearances at Starrcade. Hogan returned to WWF in 2002—after WWF acquired WCW—winning the Undisputed WWF Championship for a then-record-equalling sixth reign before departing in 2003. He was inducted into the WWE Hall of Fame in 2005, a second time in 2020 as part of the nWo, and a third time posthumously in 2026 when his match with André the Giant at WrestleMania III was inducted into the Immortal Moments category.

Outside wrestling, Hogan appeared in films such as Rocky III (1982), No Holds Barred (1989), and Suburban Commando (1991), and starred in television shows including Thunder in Paradise and Hogan Knows Best. He also fronted the Wrestling Boot Band; their sole record, Hulk Rules, reached number 12 on the Billboard Top Kid Audio chart in 1995.

Several controversies damaged Hogan's public image. In 1994, he faced scrutiny after admitting he used anabolic steroids dating back to 1976 and admitted to discouraging efforts to unionize professional wrestlers. In 2012, his reputation was more severely damaged when the internet media company Gawker published portions of a sex tape, which later had portions leak in which Hogan was heard using racial slurs and openly admitting to being racist. Hogan sued Gawker, which was found liable and subsequently declared bankruptcy. Despite this legal victory, Hogan's reputation was negatively affected, a view reflected in the mixed public reaction to his death in 2025.

== Early life ==
Hogan was born Terry Gene Bollea in Augusta, Georgia, on August 11, 1953, the son of construction foreman Pietro "Peter" Bollea (December 6, 1913 – December 18, 2001) and homemaker and dance teacher Vernice "Ruth" (née Moody; January 16, 1920 – January 1, 2011). Hogan was of Italian, Panamanian, Scottish, and French descent; his paternal grandfather, also named Pietro, was born in 1886 in Cigliano, Province of Vercelli in Piedmont. Hogan had an older brother named Allan (1947–1986) who died at the age of 38 from a drug overdose. When he was one and a half years old, his family moved to Port Tampa, Florida.

As a boy, he was a pitcher in Little League Baseball. Hogan attended Robinson High School. He began watching professional wrestling at 16 years old. While in high school, he regularly attended cards at the Tampa Sportatorium. It was at one of those wrestling cards where he first noticed "Superstar" Billy Graham and began looking to him for inspiration; since he first saw Graham on television, Hogan wanted to match his "inhuman" look.

Hogan was also a musician, spending a decade playing fretless bass guitar in several Florida-based rock bands. He went on to study at Hillsborough Community College and the University of South Florida. After music gigs began to get in the way of his time in college, he dropped out of the University of South Florida. Eventually, Hogan and two local musicians formed a band called Ruckus in 1976. The band soon became popular in the Tampa Bay region. During his spare time, Hogan worked out at Hector's Gym in the Tampa Bay area, where he began lifting. Many of the wrestlers who were competing in the Florida region visited the bars where Ruckus was performing. Among those attending his performances were Jack and Gerald Brisco.

== Professional wrestling career ==
=== Early years (1977–1979) ===
Jack and Gerald Brisco got Hogan connected with Hiro Matsuda—the man who trained wrestlers working for Championship Wrestling from Florida (CWF)—to make him a potential trainee. During the first session in training, Matsuda broke Hogan's leg. After 10 weeks of rehab, Hogan returned to train with Matsuda and blocked him when he tried to break his leg again. In Hogan's professional wrestling debut, CWF promoter Eddie Graham booked him against Brian Blair in Fort Myers, Florida, on August 10, 1977. A short time later, Hogan donned a mask and assumed the persona of "The Super Destroyer", a hooded character previously played by Don Jardine and subsequently used by other wrestlers.

After a brief career hiatus, Hogan wrestled for the Alabama-based promotion Gulf Coast Championship Wrestling (GCCW) in 1978. He formed a tag team with Ed Leslie known as the Boulder Brothers under the names Terry and Ed Boulder. During his time in Alabama, Hogan had early encounters with André the Giant, including two matches and a televised arm-wrestling contest that generated significant local interest. On May 24, 1979, Hogan wrestled his first world championship match against NWA World Heavyweight Champion Harley Race at Rip Hewes Sports Complex in Dothan, Alabama. Hogan pinned Race during the match and was briefly announced as the new champion on GCCW television. However, the NWA later overturned the decision, declaring a disqualification and nullifying the title change. Hogan went on to win the Southeastern Heavyweight Championship twice later in the year; first defeating Ox Baker, then again after regaining it from Professor Tanaka, following a brief loss to Austin Idol.

Later that year, Hogan and Leslie joined Jerry Jarrett's Memphis-based promotion Continental Wrestling Association (CWA). While in Memphis, Hogan made a talk show appearance alongside actor Lou Ferrigno, star of the television series The Incredible Hulk. The host commented that Hogan, standing 6 ft 7 in (201 cm) and weighing 295 lbs (134 kg) with 24-inch (61 cm) biceps, dwarfed Ferrigno. Inspired by this, Mary Jarrett suggested the nickname "The Hulk," resulting in Hogan wrestling as Terry "The Hulk" Boulder. He also occasionally performed under the name Sterling Golden.

=== World Wrestling Federation (1979–1981) ===
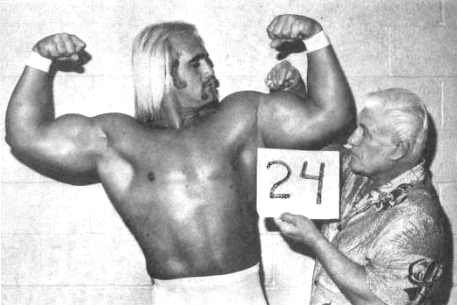
Hogan and his manager Freddie Blassie, c. 1980

According to his autobiography My Life Outside the Ring, Bollea briefly left professional wrestling in 1979 and was working on the Tampa docks when he was spotted by Gerald Brisco. Brisco and his brother encouraged Hogan to return to wrestling and helped arrange a meeting with World Wide Wrestling Federation promoter Vincent J. McMahon. However this claim is disputed, with some wrestling historians crediting Terry Funk with recommending Hogan to McMahon, having recognized his potential during Hogan's early matches. Funk, who previously appeared in the 1978 Sylvester Stallone film Paradise Alley, would also later recommend Hogan to Stallone for the role of Thunderlips in Rocky III.

McMahon, impressed with Bollea's charisma and physical stature, offered him a spot on the WWWF roster as an opponent for André the Giant. McMahon, who wanted to use an Irish name, gave him the last name Hogan, and suggested he dye his hair red. Hogan, whose hair was already thinning, declined, quipping, "I'll be a blond Irishman." Hogan wrestled his first match in the WWWF under the ring name "Hulk Hogan" by defeating Harry Valdez on the November 17 episode of Championship Wrestling. He was presented as a villain in the WWWF, and was managed by "Classy" Freddie Blassie.

The next year, Hogan began a high-profile feud with André the Giant. On August 9, 1980, at Showdown at Shea, André defeated Hogan. Hogan notably body-slammed André during the bout, an early version of the iconic moment that would later be immortalized at WrestleMania III. They faced off again on August 30, 1980, at Madison Square Garden in a televised match with Gorilla Monsoon serving as special guest referee. Once again, Hogan managed to body-slam André, but again lost to him.

=== New Japan Pro-Wrestling (1980–1985) ===
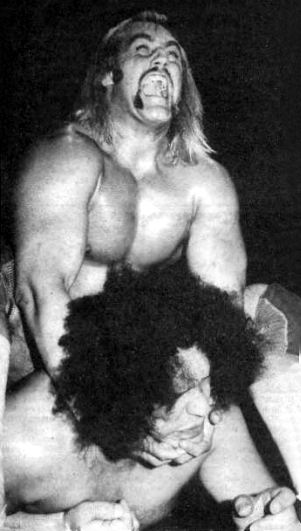
Hulk Hogan and André the Giant during the Superdome Showdown professional wrestling event on August 2, 1980, in New Orleans

In 1980, Hulk Hogan began wrestling for New Japan Pro-Wrestling (NJPW), where he was nicknamed "Ichiban" (一番; "Number One"). by Japanese fans. He made his debut on May 13, 1980, while still under contract with the WWF, and continued to tour Japan occasionally over the next few years. During his time in NJPW, Hogan used a more technical wrestling style than the power-based approach he used in the United States. He also used the Axe Bomber, a crooked arm lariat, as his finisher in Japan instead of the running leg drop.

While still appearing for the WWF, including wrestling Pedro Morales for the Intercontinental Championship on March 26, 1981, Hogan achieved major success in Japan. On June 2, 1983, he won the inaugural International Wrestling Grand Prix (IWGP) tournament by defeating Antonio Inoki by knockout, becoming the first holder of the original version of the IWGP Heavyweight Championship. Hogan also teamed with Inoki to win the MSG Tag League tournament in both 1982 and 1983.

In 1984, Hogan returned to NJPW to defend the IWGP title against Inoki, who had earned a title shot by winning that year's IWGP League. Hogan lost the match and therefore the title by countout after interference from Riki Choshu. During this period, Hogan also defended his WWF World Heavyweight Championship in Japan against opponents like Seiji Sakaguchi and Tatsumi Fujinami. His final match of that tour was on June 13, 1984, where he again lost to Inoki by countout in an IWGP title match. Hogan was the only IWGP champion to defend the title without winning the qualifying tournament.

=== American Wrestling Association (1981–1983) ===
After accepting a role in Rocky III, a decision that led to Vincent J. McMahon releasing him from the WWF, Hogan joined the American Wrestling Association (AWA), owned by Verne Gagne, in August 1981. He initially debuted as a villain managed by "Luscious" Johnny Valiant, but quickly became a fan favorite due to his charisma and popularity with the crowd. Hogan soon began feuding with the villainous Heenan Family and Nick Bockwinkel. His official turn to a hero occurred in mid-1981 during a televised segment where he saved Brad Rheingans from an attack by Jerry Blackwell. This sparked a feud with Blackwell, which Hogan eventually won, leading to his first title matches against Bockwinkel by the end of the year.

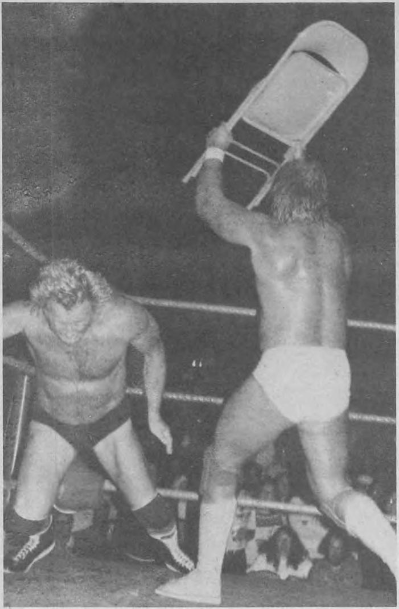
Hulk Hogan (right) wrestling Nick Bockwinkel in 1982.

In March 1982, Hogan defeated Bockwinkel and his manager Bobby Heenan in a non-title handicap match in the International Amphitheatre in Chicago, Illinois. He repeatedly challenged Bockwinkel for the AWA World Heavyweight Championship, with most of their matches ended in disqualification, preventing a title change. In April 1982, Hogan seemingly won the championship in St. Paul, Minnesota, but the decision was later overturned by AWA President Stanley Blackburn due to the use of a foreign object.

Hogan introduced the term "Hulkamania" during a June 15, 1982, appearance on The Tonight Show with Johnny Carson. Following his role in Rocky III, "Hulkamania" gained widespread popularity. It was also during his time in the AWA that Hogan would first claim "Hulkamania is running wild," a recurring catchphrase of his over his career.

Despite his growing popularity, Gagne resisted making Hogan the AWA World Champion, personally preferring traditional technical and mat wrestling over Hogan's muscle-bound, flamboyant, entertainment-driven style, and remaining firm about having the AWA being built around one of its best technical wrestlers. Gagne later agreed to have Hogan win the title at AWA's Super Sunday event on April 24, 1983, but only if Hogan gave him the majority share of his merchandise and earnings in New Japan Pro-Wrestling. Hogan declined, offering only a 50/50 split, and Gagne withheld the championship. While Hogan still pinned Bockwinkel at Super Sunday, the decision was reversed later that night. After further unsuccessful title attempts, a storyline teased Hogan leaving the promotion. However he returned on July 31, 1983, wearing an "American Made" shirt and focusing on a new feud with Masa Saito.

Later that year, Vince McMahon Jr. secretly visited Hogan in Minneapolis and offered him a leading role in the WWF. Hogan accepted and abruptly left the AWA in November 1983, reportedly sending his resignation by telegram. Gagne initially believed it was a prank until he realized Hogan was not showing up for AWA shows. In his memoir My Life Outside the Wrestling Ring, Hogan stated that he left because McMahon promised him the WWF Heavyweight Championship and a key role in expanding the company nationally.

=== World Wrestling Federation (1983–1993) ===
==== Rise of Hulkamania (1983–1984) ====
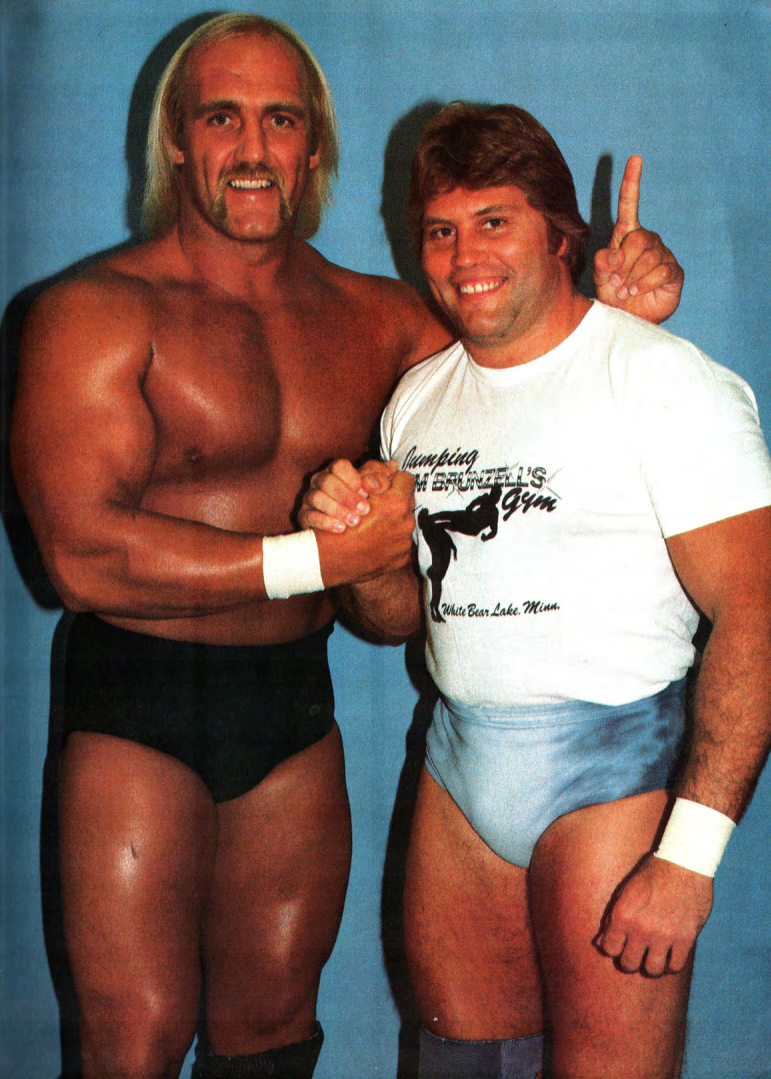
Hulk Hogan (left) and Jim Brunzell, December 1983

After purchasing the WWF from his father in 1982, Vincent K. McMahon planned to expand the company nationally and selected Hulk Hogan as its top star, citing his charisma and widespread recognition. Hogan returned to the WWF at a television taping in St. Louis, Missouri, on December 27, 1983, defeating Bill Dixon.

On the January 7, 1984, episode of Championship Wrestling, Hogan solidified his status as a fan favorite by rescuing Bob Backlund from an attack by the Wild Samoans. On January 23, 1984, Hogan won his first WWF World Heavyweight Championship by defeating The Iron Sheik at Madison Square Garden, becoming the first wrestler to escape the Sheik's finishing move, the camel clutch, in the process.

Following his victory, commentator Gorilla Monsoon famously declared, "Hulkamania is here!" Hogan quickly became the face of the WWF, referring to his fans as "Hulkamaniacs" and promoting his "three demandments": training, saying prayers, and eating vitamins. A fourth, "believing in yourself," was later added during his 1990 feud with Earthquake. Hogan's ring attire adopted a red-and-yellow color scheme, and his entrances featured him tearing his shirt, posing, and encouraging the crowd to cheer.

His matches during this period often followed a formula: after an initial offense, he would appear to be on the verge of defeat after being beaten down by his opponent, before "Hulking up" drawing on crowd energy to make a sudden comeback. This would be then followed by his signature sequence of moves: finger-pointing, punches, an Irish whip, the big boot and running leg drop to secure victory.

==== International renown (1985–1989) ====
Rise to Stardom

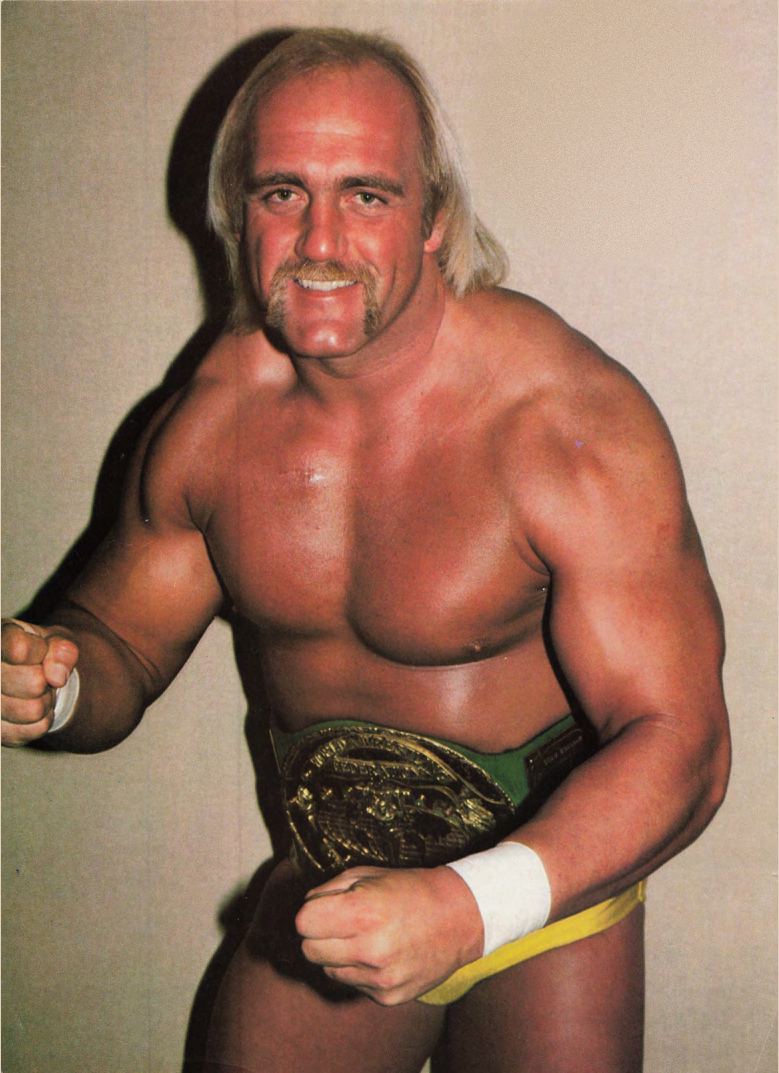
Hulk Hogan, c. 1984, during his first reign as WWF World Champion

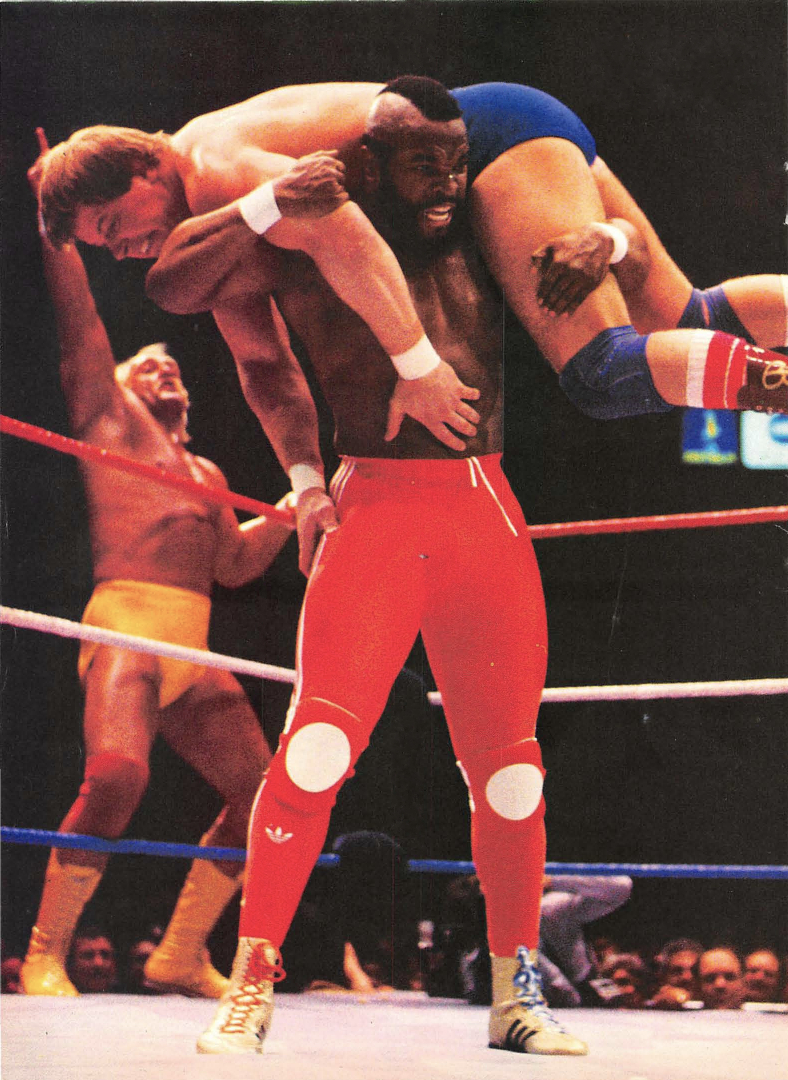
Mr. T hoists Roddy Piper up onto his shoulders as Hulk Hogan cheers in the background during the main event of the first ever Wrestlemania.

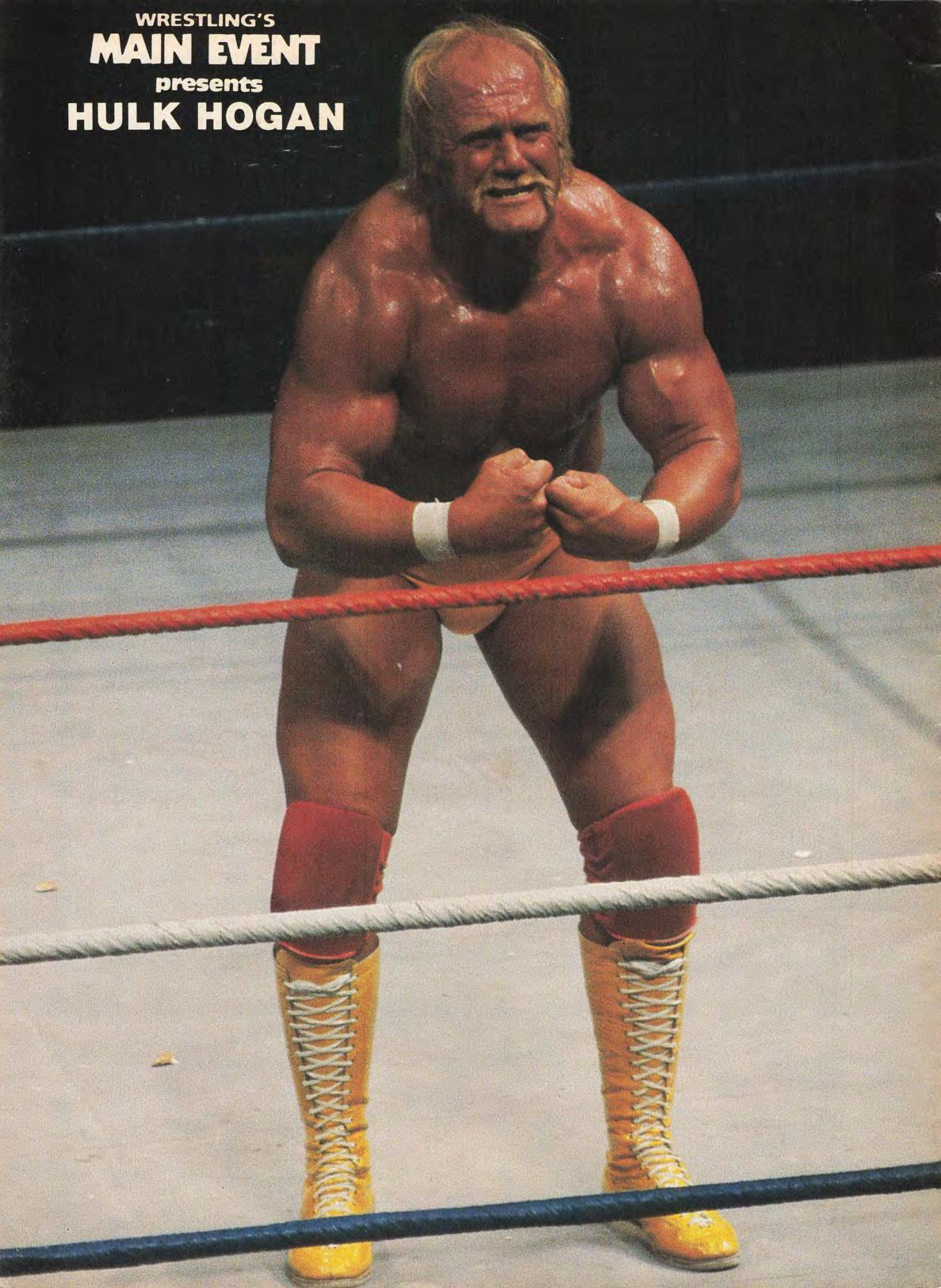
Hulk Hogan in 1987

Over the following year, Hulk Hogan became the face of professional wrestling as Vince McMahon expanded the WWF into mainstream pop culture through the Rock 'n' Wrestling Connection on MTV. This period saw large increases in attendance, television ratings, and pay-per-view buys. Hogan was the main attraction at the first WrestleMania, held on March 31, 1985, where he teamed with actor and wrestler Mr. T to defeat "Rowdy" Roddy Piper and "Mr. Wonderful" Paul Orndorff. He later faced Piper again at The Wrestling Classic in November 1985. Throughout 1986, Hogan made multiple successful title defenses, including against King Kong Bundy at WrestleMania 2 and Orndorff at The Big Event and Saturday Night's Main Event IX. In the fall he occasionally wrestled in tag team matches with The Machines as Hulk Machine under a mask copied from NJPW's gimmick "Super Strong Machine".

At WrestleMania III in 1987, Hogan defended his title against André the Giant, promoted as undefeated for 15 years. André turned heel by aligning with manager Bobby Heenan in the lead-up to a match at WrestleMania III, which was billed as one of the biggest matches in wrestling history. At the event, Hogan successfully defended the title by body-slamming André, winning the match with a leg drop. However, he went on to lose the championship to André on The Main Event I in February 1988, after a setup involving Ted DiBiase and referee Earl Hebner, who had replaced his twin brother, the assigned official. André then gave the title to DiBiase, leading WWF President Jack Tunney to vacate it. This was a storyline excuse because Hogan was forced to give up the title so that he can take time off after WrestleMania IV to film No Holds Barred and spend time with his newborn daughter Brooke.

At WrestleMania IV, Hogan was eliminated from a tournament to determine a new champion after a match with André ended in a double disqualification. After this, he formed a partnership with the winner of the tournament, Randy Savage, known as the Mega Powers. The duo feuded with the Mega Bucks and the Twin Towers throughout the rest of 1988. However, by the end of 1988, the alliance had begun to fall apart after the storyline saw Savage grow jealous of Hogan and begin to suspect romantic tension between Hogan and his wife and manager, Miss Elizabeth, leading to a break-up at The Main Event II. This culminated at WrestleMania V, where Hogan defeated Savage to win his second WWF World Heavyweight Championship.

==== Further WWF Championship reigns and departure (1989–1993) ====
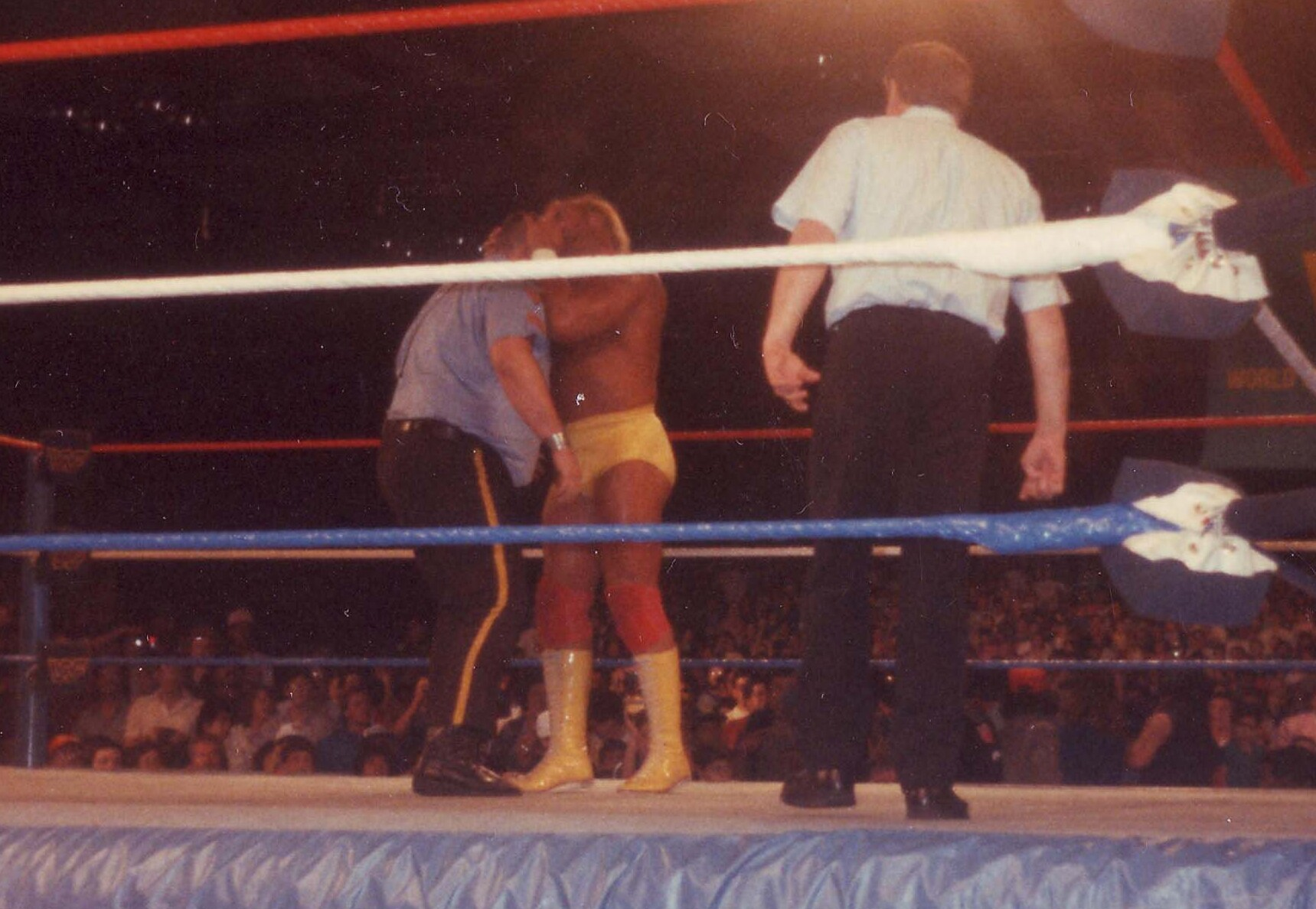
Hulk Hogan against Big Boss Man in March 1989

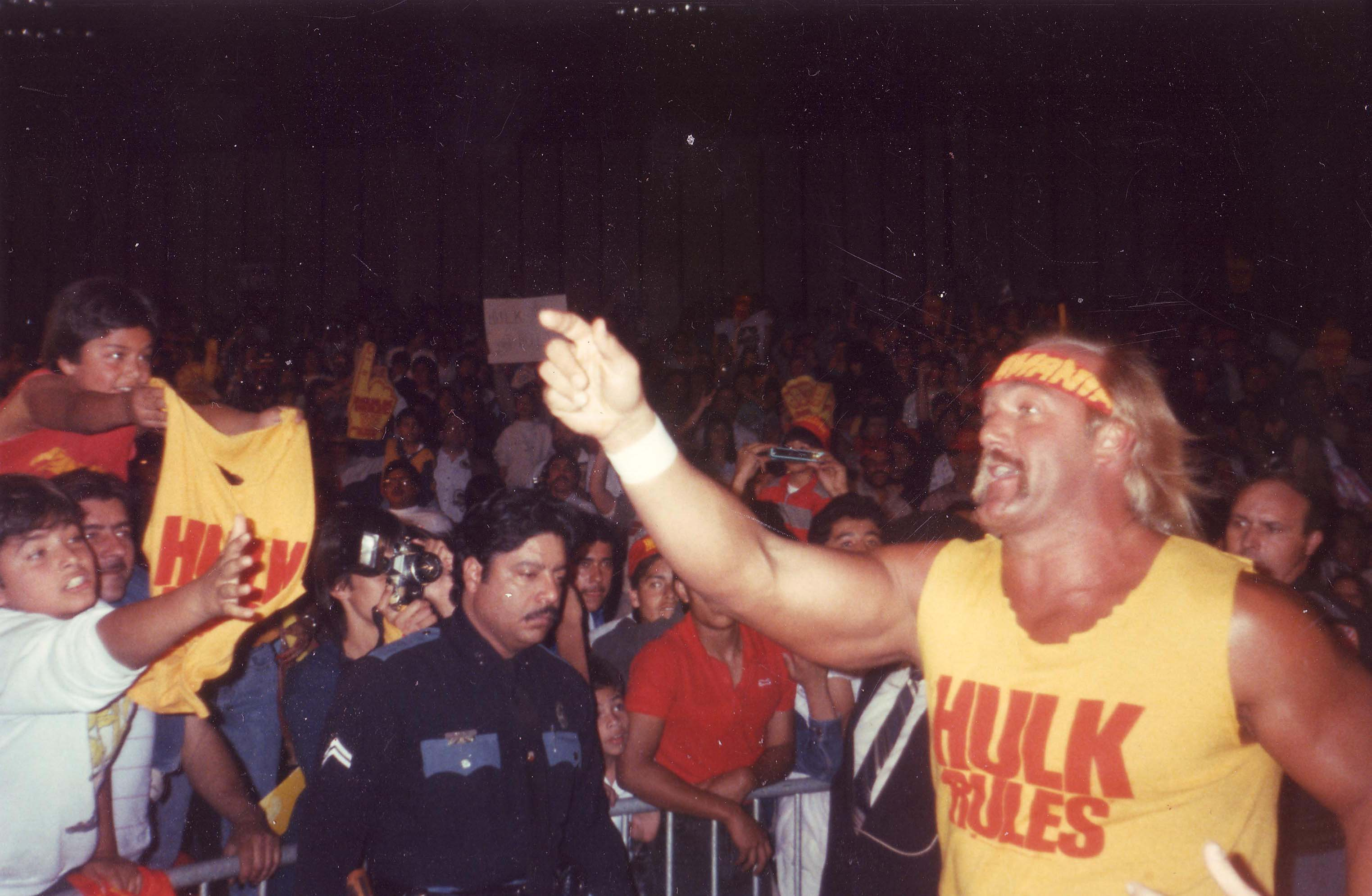
Hogan making his way to the ring at the El Paso Convention Center on March 7, 1989, for a Superstars of Wrestling televised event

During Hogan's second reign as champion, he starred in the film No Holds Barred, which was the inspiration of a feud with Hogan's co-star Tom Lister Jr., who appeared at wrestling events as his film character Zeus. The duo would fight multiple times across the country during late 1989, including tag team matches at SummerSlam and at the No Holds Barred pay-per-view, with Hogan winning each match. He also won the 1990 Royal Rumble match, during which he encountered Ultimate Warrior for the first time.

Their brief interaction in the match led to a feud between the pair, culminating in Hogan losing his championship to Warrior in a title vs title match at WrestleMania VI. Afterwards, Hogan began feuding with Earthquake in a sneak attack on The Brother Love Show in which Earthquake injured Hogan's ribs and was carried out and was out of action for a few months, in reality, Hogan needed time off because around this time, his son Nick Hogan was born and also Hogan was going to film the movie Suburban Commando. Hogan returned in mid-summer 1990 and challenged Earthquake to a match at SummerSlam and originally wanted Tugboat to be in his corner while Dino Bravo and Jimmy Hart would be in Earthquake's corner. However Tugboat was also injured by Earthquake and Hogan got his former rival Big Boss Man to replace Tugboat and be in Hogan's corner and Hogan defeated Earthquake by a count out. Hogan and Earthquake continued to feud until February 1991.

Hogan became the first wrestler to win two Royal Rumble matches in a row after winning the 1991 Royal Rumble match. He subsequently defeated Sgt. Slaughter at WrestleMania VII, and lost the title to The Undertaker at Survivor Series later that year following interference from Ric Flair. Hogan regained the championship at This Tuesday in Texas six days later after throwing ashes from The Undertaker's urn in his face. The championship was later declared vacant due to two succeeding controversial title changes.

It was decided that the vacant WWF Championship would be decided in the 1992 Royal Rumble match. During the match, Hogan was eliminated by Sid Justice, who in turn Hogan helped Flair to eliminate, leading to Flair's victory. Hogan and Flair subsequently faced each other at several live events leading up to WrestleMania VIII, although the two were never featured in a major televised WWF match. Instead, Hogan defeated Sid via disqualification at WrestleMania after interference by Sid's manager Harvey Wippleman. During this time, news sources began to allege that George Zahorian, a doctor for the Pennsylvania State Athletic Commission, had been selling steroids illegally to WWF wrestlers, including Hogan. Amidst public scrutiny, Hogan took a leave of absence from the company in late 1992.

Hogan returned to the WWF in February 1993, helping his friend Brutus Beefcake in his feud with Money Inc. and taking on Jimmy Hart, who had recently turned face, as his manager. Renaming themselves the Mega-Maniacs, at WrestleMania IX Hogan and Beefcake lost by disqualification to Money Inc. in a match for the WWF Tag Team Championship. Later that night, Hogan won his fifth WWF Championship by pinning Yokozuna in an impromptu match only moments after Yokozuna had defeated Bret Hart for the championship. Hogan reportedly used his influence to have the finish of WrestleMania changed the weekend of the event so he would be champion during an upcoming international and de facto farewell tour. WWF Official Bruce Prichard has said in interviews Hogan was made champion to help ticket sales for a WWF tour of Europe.

At the first annual King of the Ring pay-per-view on June 13, Hogan lost the WWF Championship to Yokozuna after Hogan was blinded by a fireball shot by Harvey Wippleman disguised as a "Japanese photographer". This was Hogan's last WWF pay-per-view appearance until 2002; after continuing his feud on the international house show circuit with Yokozuna until August 1993, Hogan sat out the rest of his contract which expired later that year.

In 1993, Hogan opted to leave the WWF in order to distance himself from the ongoing steroid scandal surrounding Vince McMahon. By November 1993, Hogan had ended his affiliation with the WWF and was now focusing on filming his television series Thunder in Paradise. On the February 10, 2026, episode of his YouTube show "Something to Wrestle with Bruce Prichard," longtime WWE official Bruce Prichard acknowledged to Conrad Thompson that like other employees who left around the time, Hogan's decision to join World Championship Wrestling (WCW) after leaving the WWF was in fact on his own terms, with Hogan cutting off ties to the WWF after being offered a lucrative deal for more money, which WCW overall owner Ted Turner could easily provide. However, Prichard also stated that Vince in fact "made excuses" for Hogan with regards to Hogan's decision to end ties with him, putting more blame on Ted Turner and Hogan's ties to Turner's company which he got through Thunder in Paradise. Regardless of what McMahon thought, though, it was acknowledged on a broadcast which aired on local Florida TV station WESH 2 on November 9, 1993, that Hogan's main business collaborator for Thunder in Paradise was in fact the Walt Disney Company, which even lent him its biggest soundstage at Disney-MGM Studios, which was even described on the broadcast as Hogan's "new home;" however, the Disney-MGM Studios was also at the time being used for WCW tapings.

=== Return to NJPW (1993–1994) ===
On May 3, 1993, Hogan returned to NJPW as WWF Champion and defeated IWGP Heavyweight Champion The Great Muta at Wrestling Dontaku. Hogan also wrestled the Hell Raisers with Muta and Masahiro Chono as his tag team partners. His last match in Japan was on January 4, 1994, at Battlefield, when he defeated Tatsumi Fujinami.

=== World Championship Wrestling (1994–2000) ===
==== World Heavyweight Champion; feud with Alliance to End Hulkamania (1994–1996) ====
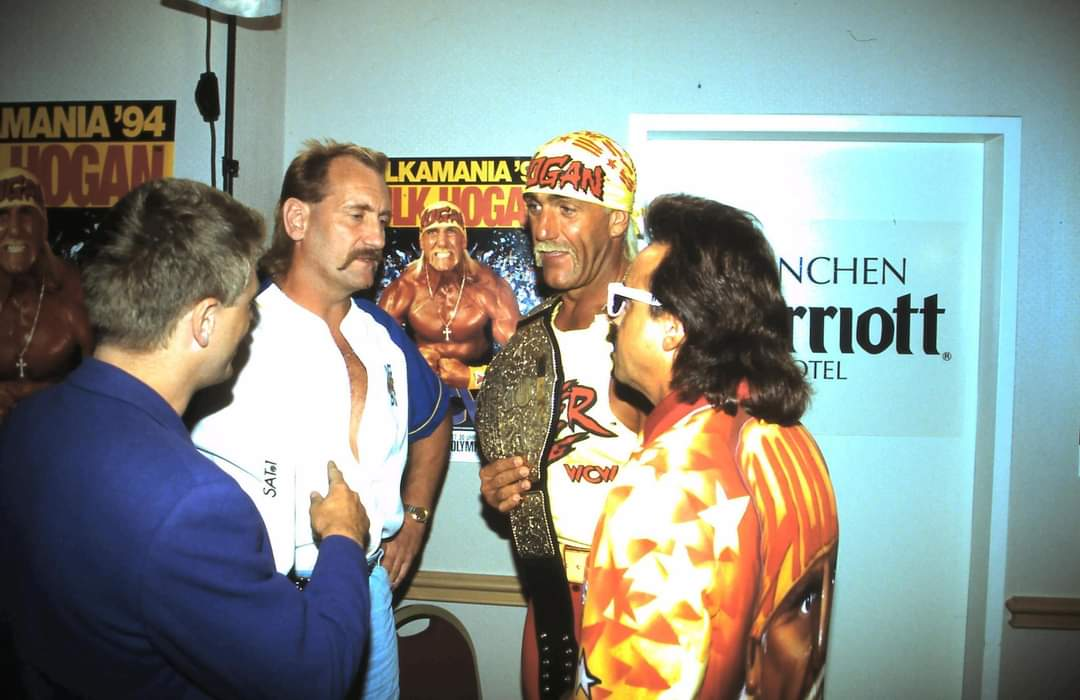
Hogan with Jimmy Hart in 1994

Starting in March 1994, Hogan began making appearances on World Championship Wrestling (WCW) television, with interviewer Gene Okerlund visiting him on the set of Thunder in Paradise episodes. On June 11, 1994, Hogan officially signed with WCW in a ceremony that was held at Disney-MGM Studios. Jimmy Hart remained Hogan's manager. The next month, Hogan made his in-ring debut at Bash at the Beach defeating Ric Flair to win the WCW World Heavyweight Championship. Hogan's arrival was seen as a turning point for the company, bringing mainstream attention, increased pay-per-view sales, and new sponsorships. Afterwards, Hogan continued feuding with Flair and later faced other top stars like The Butcher and Vader over the WCW World Heavyweight Championship. Hogan also reunited with Randy Savage, reforming the Mega Powers in WCW.

In September 1995, Hogan headlined the debut episode of WCW Monday Nitro, marking the beginning of the Monday Night Wars with the WWF. Hogan feuded with the Dungeon of Doom, leading to a WarGames match at Fall Brawl where Hogan's team claimed victory. As the feud continued afterwards, Hogan began wearing all black and claimed he had crossed over to "the dark side." Hogan's 469-day title reign, the longest in the title's history, ended at Halloween Havoc after a disqualification loss to The Giant. During the event, Jimmy Hart also turned on Hogan and aligned himself with the Dungeon of Doom. On November 8, 1995, of Nitro, it was revealed that the title was allowed to change hands under such circumstances due to Hart secretly putting in an agreed contract clause, but the controversy led to the title being vacated. Despite this, Hogan was unsuccessful in reclaiming the title at World War 3. Hogan would have afterwards only have one more title shot during this period in his WCW run, against Ric Flair on the January 1, 1996, of Nitro, but would be unsuccessful in taking the belt from Flair due to Flair being disqualified; he would not get another title shot until the summer of 1996. Hogan would end his singles feud with The Giant with a cage match victory at SuperBrawl VI. In early 1996, Hogan and Savage formed a team to battle The Alliance to End Hulkamania, defeating them at Uncensored in a Doomsday Cage match.

==== New World Order (1996–1999) ====
At Bash at the Beach 1996, Hulk Hogan turned heel for the first time in nearly fifteen years by attacking Randy Savage and aligning with The Outsiders (Kevin Nash and Scott Hall), cutting a promo afterwards in which he announced the formation of the New World Order (nWo). Rebranding himself as "Hollywood" Hulk Hogan or simply "Hollywood Hogan," he adopted a new black-and-white persona and grew a black beard and dominated WCW, capturing his second WCW World Heavyweight Championship at Hog Wild on August 10 by defeating The Giant for the title. In early summer 1997, he began using the Jimi Hendrix song Voodoo Child (Slight Return) as his entrance music, he would play air guitar (either with the championship belt or not) and lip sync the song while walking to the ring. He briefly lost the WCW title to Lex Luger on the August 4, 1997, episode of Nitro, only to regain it five days later at Road Wild. Meanwhile, a lengthy storyline between Sting and the nWo reached its pinnacle at Starrcade on December 28, where Sting defeated Hogan to win the championship in a controversial finish.

A feud with fellow nWo members Randy Savage and Kevin Nash led to the group's split into "nWo Hollywood" led by Hogan and "nWo Wolfpac" led by Nash; Hogan defeated Savage to win his fourth WCW World Heavyweight Championship on the April 20, 1998, episode of Nitro. He lost the title to the then-undefeated Bill Goldberg on the July 6, 1998, episode of Nitro. After this, he spent the rest of 1998 feuding with Diamond Dallas Page in high-profile celebrity matches at various WCW PPVs, involving the likes of Dennis Rodman, Karl Malone (Bash at the Beach), and Jay Leno (Road Wild). and then the Warrior. Hogan would have a critically panned rematch with the Warrior at Halloween Havoc on October 25, where his nephew Horace Hogan aided his victory. In late 1998, he announced a presidential run and retirement from wrestling, which were later revealed as publicity stunts derived from professional wrestler Jesse Ventura's recent Minnesota gubernatorial win.

Hogan returned to WCW in January 1999 during the infamous "Fingerpoke of Doom" match, where he reclaimed the WCW Championship from Kevin Nash via a simple poke to Nash's chest, with the pair afterwards reunifying the nWo factions. The incident is widely seen as a key factor in WCW's decline in ratings and popularity. Later that year in March, he lost the title to Ric Flair at Uncensored.

==== Final years in WCW (1999–2000) ====
Hogan returned as a babyface in July 1999, defeating Savage to win his sixth and final WCW World Heavyweight Championship on the July 12 episode of Nitro. In August 1999, he reverted to wearing red and yellow ring attire. On August 9, Hogan defeated Nash at Road Wild to retain the championship. At Fall Brawl, Hogan lost the title to Sting. In the rematch at Halloween Havoc, Hogan came to the ring in street clothes, laid down for the pin, and left the ring. Hogan was convinced shortly after by head booker Vince Russo to take time off.

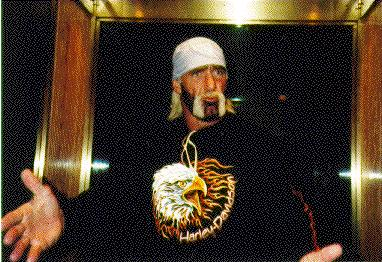
Hogan in 2000

After Russo was ousted as booker January 2000, Hogan returned in February 2000 back in his full red and yellow Hulkamania gimmick again, entering into a feud with Lex Luger & Ric Flair. His laying down for Sting at Halloween Havoc was completely ignored and forgotten. He defeated Luger at SuperBrawl 2000 and Flair at Uncensored.

After the Russo & Bischoff WCW reboot in April 2000, Hogan returned and formed a new stable, the Millionaire's Club, which feuded with the New Blood stable. His gimmick changed to a more realistic, anti-hero character similar to Stone Cold Steve Austin. His real name, Terry Bollea, was openly referenced on television during the gimmick change. He began wearing all black with an open, sleeveless shirt that said "FUNB" on the back, a pejorative referring to the New Blood. He began feuding with the New Blood member cruiserweight Billy Kidman, leading to matches at Slamboree and The Great American Bash. Their feud had a negative reception, being voted worst feud of the year by readers of the Wrestling Observer Newsletter. After his feud with Kidman concluded, Hogan dropped the "FUNB" gimmick and returned to being Hollywood Hogan.

At Bash at the Beach on July 9, 2000, Hogan was involved in a controversial segment. Hogan was scheduled to challenge Jeff Jarrett for the WCW World Heavyweight Championship, however before the match, there was a backstage dispute between Hogan and Russo. The match ending was changed to a worked shoot where Jarrett laid down for Hogan, with Hogan after winning, disparaging Russo and the company on the microphone. Moments later, Russo came to the ring and said this would be "the last time fans would ever see that piece of shit in a WCW ring" while revealing Hogan's creative control clause in his contract. As a result, Hogan filed a defamation of character lawsuit against Russo, which was eventually dismissed in 2002. Russo claims the entire incident was a work, and Hogan claimed that Russo had turned it into a shoot when Russo went into the ring. WCW President Eric Bischoff agreed with Hogan's side of the story, saying he and Hogan celebrated after the event over the success of the angle, but that Russo coming out to fire Hogan was unplanned. Regardless, the incident marked Hogan's final appearance in WCW.

In March 2001, Hogan underwent surgery on his knees, wrestling in a match for Xcitement Wrestling Federation (XWF) in November 2001 in preparation for his return to the WWF in February 2002.

=== Second return to WWF/WWE (2002–2003) ===
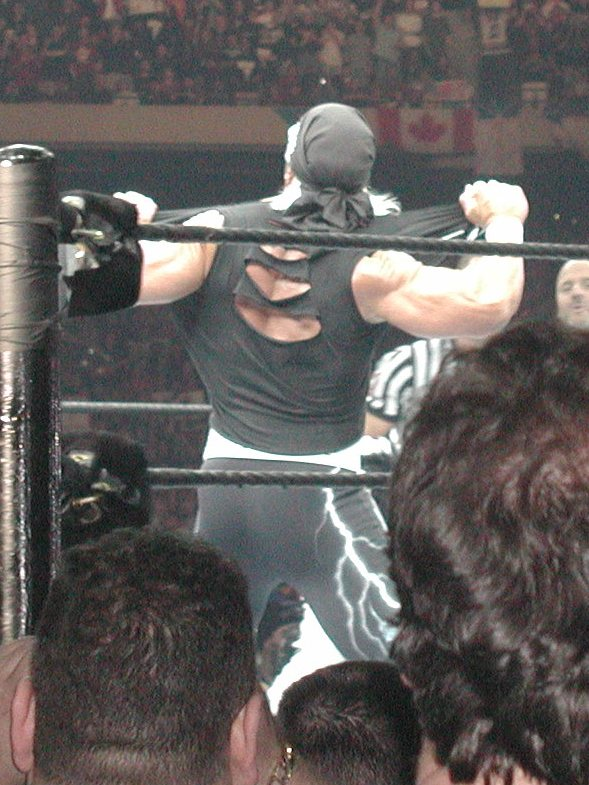
Hogan making his entrance at WrestleMania X8 in March 2002, his first WrestleMania in nine years

At No Way Out on February 17, 2002, Hogan returned to the WWF as a heel, reuniting with Scott Hall and Kevin Nash as the original nWo. The group attacked The Rock and cost Stone Cold Steve Austin a chance at becoming the Undisputed WWF Champion, which led to them feuding with both Austin and The Rock. This resulted in a match between Hogan and The Rock at WrestleMania X8 on March 17.

Although Hogan entered as a heel, the WrestleMania crowd supported him and cheered him heavily. After losing the match, Hogan shook hands with The Rock and turned face, distancing himself from the nWo. Following WrestleMania X8, Hogan revived his red and yellow "Hulkamania" persona, though he initially kept elements of his "Hollywood" character such as his blonde mustache and black beard combination and also began using Voodoo Child as his entrance music again. On the March 25 episode of Raw, Hogan was drafted to the SmackDown! brand, where he began a feud with Triple H. Hogan defeated Triple H at Backlash on April 21 to win the Undisputed WWF Championship, becoming the final WWF Champion before the company was renamed WWE in May 2002.

Hogan lost the title to The Undertaker at Judgment Day on May 19. Hogan later feuded with Kurt Angle, losing to him by submission at King of the Ring on June 23; notably the first time Hogan had lost by submission in WWE. On the July 4 episode of SmackDown!, Hogan teamed with Edge to defeat Billy and Chuck to win the WWE Tag Team Championship, before losing the titles to The Un-Americans (Christian and Lance Storm) at Vengeance on July 21. Hogan was also notably defeated by Brock Lesnar by technical submission on the August 8 episode of SmackDown!.

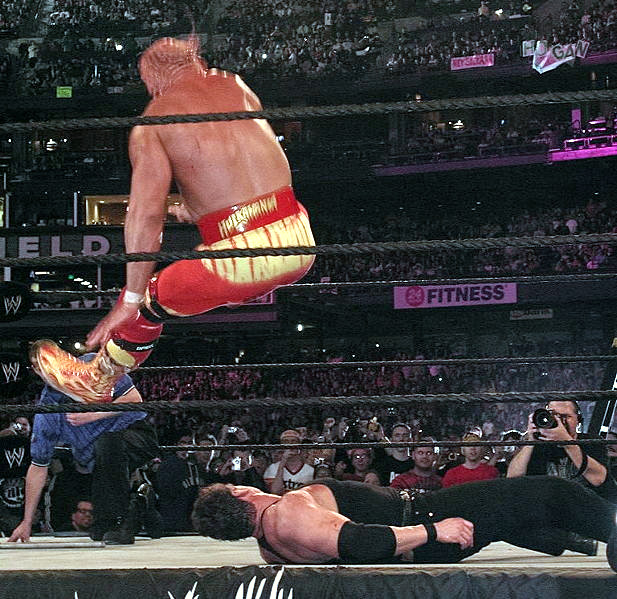
Hogan performing his signature leg drop on Mr. McMahon at WrestleMania XIX

After his loss to Lesnar, Hogan went on a brief hiatus before returning on January 23, 2003. He dropped the "Hollywood" name and went by simply Hulk Hogan, but continued to use Voodoo Child as his entrance music. Hogan faced The Rock again at No Way Out on February 23, losing the match. At WrestleMania XIX on March 30, Hogan defeated Vince McMahon in a street fight billed as "20 years in the making".

After WrestleMania XIX, Hogan was "fired" by McMahon. Subsequently, SmackDown general manager Stephanie McMahon announced the signing of a new wrestler, "Mr. America", whose debut was promoted over several weeks via a series of patriotic vignettes. Mr. America made his first appearance on the May 1, 2003, episode of SmackDown; despite wearing a mask, his mannerisms and promos made it obvious that he was Hogan. after McMahon tried to force him out of the WWE. Despite McMahon's attempts to prove Mr. America's identity, the masked wrestler continued to appear through May and June, including a victory over "Rowdy" Roddy Piper at Judgment Day on May 18. Mr. America's final appearance was on the June 26 episode of SmackDown! in a six-man tag team match, as he teamed with Brock Lesnar and Kurt Angle against Big Show and The World's Greatest Tag Team (Charlie Haas and Shelton Benjamin) in a losing effort. The following week, Hogan quit WWE due to creative frustrations, unhappy with the payoffs for his matches after his comeback under the Mr. America gimmick. On the July 3 episode of SmackDown!, McMahon aired footage of Hogan unmasking after the June 26 episode of SmackDown! and "fired" him on-screen, although Hogan had already left the company.

=== Second return to NJPW (2003) ===
Hogan returned to NJPW in October 2003, when he defeated Masahiro Chono at Ultimate Crush II in the Tokyo Dome. Shortly after Hogan left WWE, Total Nonstop Action Wrestling (TNA) began making overtures to Hogan, culminating in Jeff Jarrett, co-founder of TNA and then NWA World Heavyweight Champion, launching an on-air attack on Hogan in Japan after the Chono match. The attack was supposed to be a precursor to Hogan battling Jarrett for the NWA World Heavyweight Championship at TNA's first three-hour pay-per-view. Due to recurring knee and hip problems, Hogan did not appear in TNA.

=== Third return to WWE (2005–2007) ===
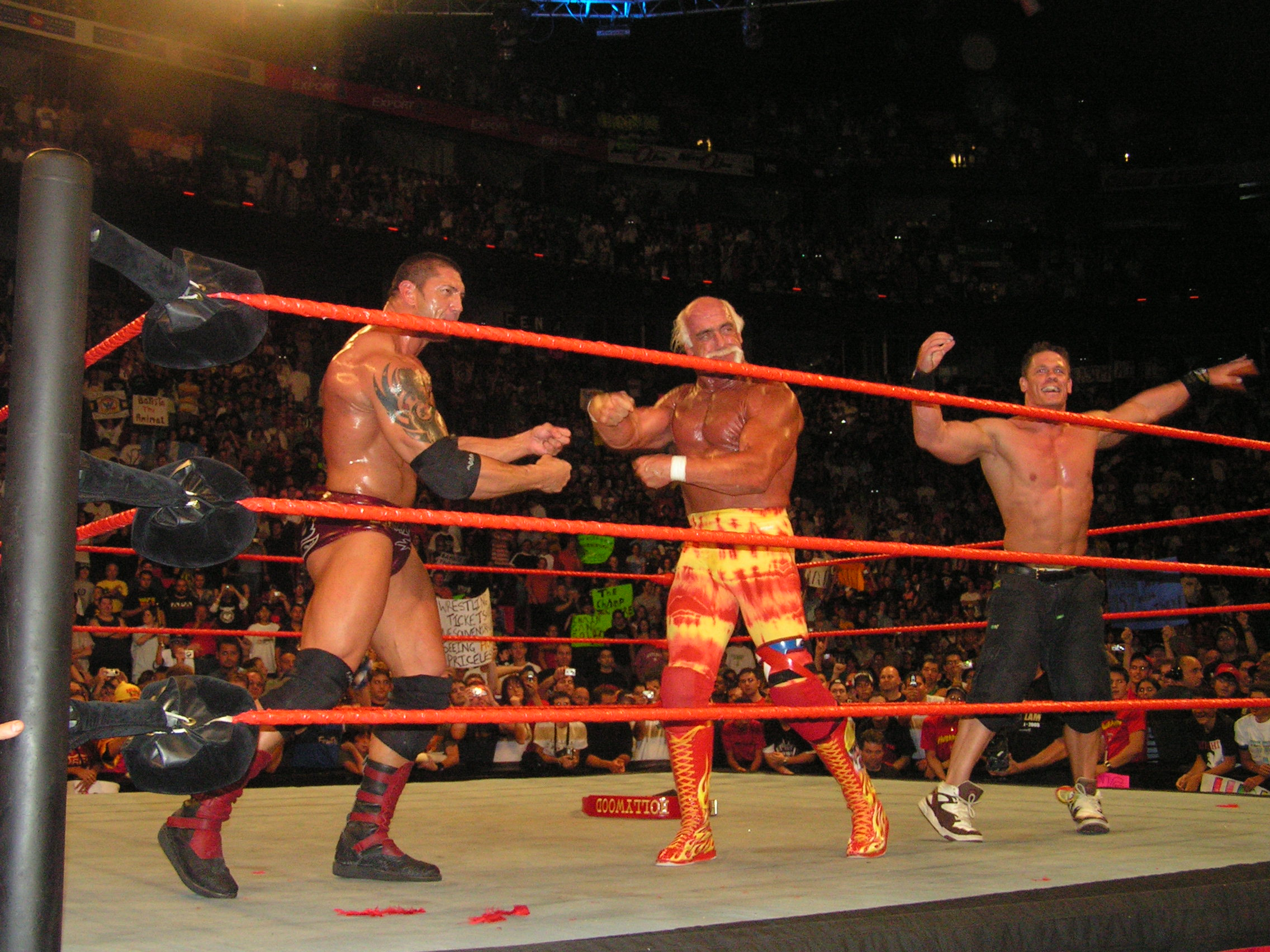
Batista, Hulk Hogan and John Cena

On April 2, 2005, Hulk Hogan was inducted into the WWE Hall of Fame class of 2005 by Sylvester Stallone. The following night at WrestleMania 21, Hogan made a surprise appearance to save Eugene from an attack from Muhammad Hassan and Khosrow Daivari. The lead-up to his induction and WrestleMania appearance was featured in the first season of Hogan Knows Best. At Backlash, Hogan teamed with Shawn Michaels to defeat Hassan and Daivari. Hogan and Michaels were later victorious in a match on the July 4 episode of Raw against Carlito and Kurt Angle, after which Michaels turned on Hogan. This led to a match at SummerSlam on August 21, where Hogan defeated Michaels. The two made up after the match, shaking hands.

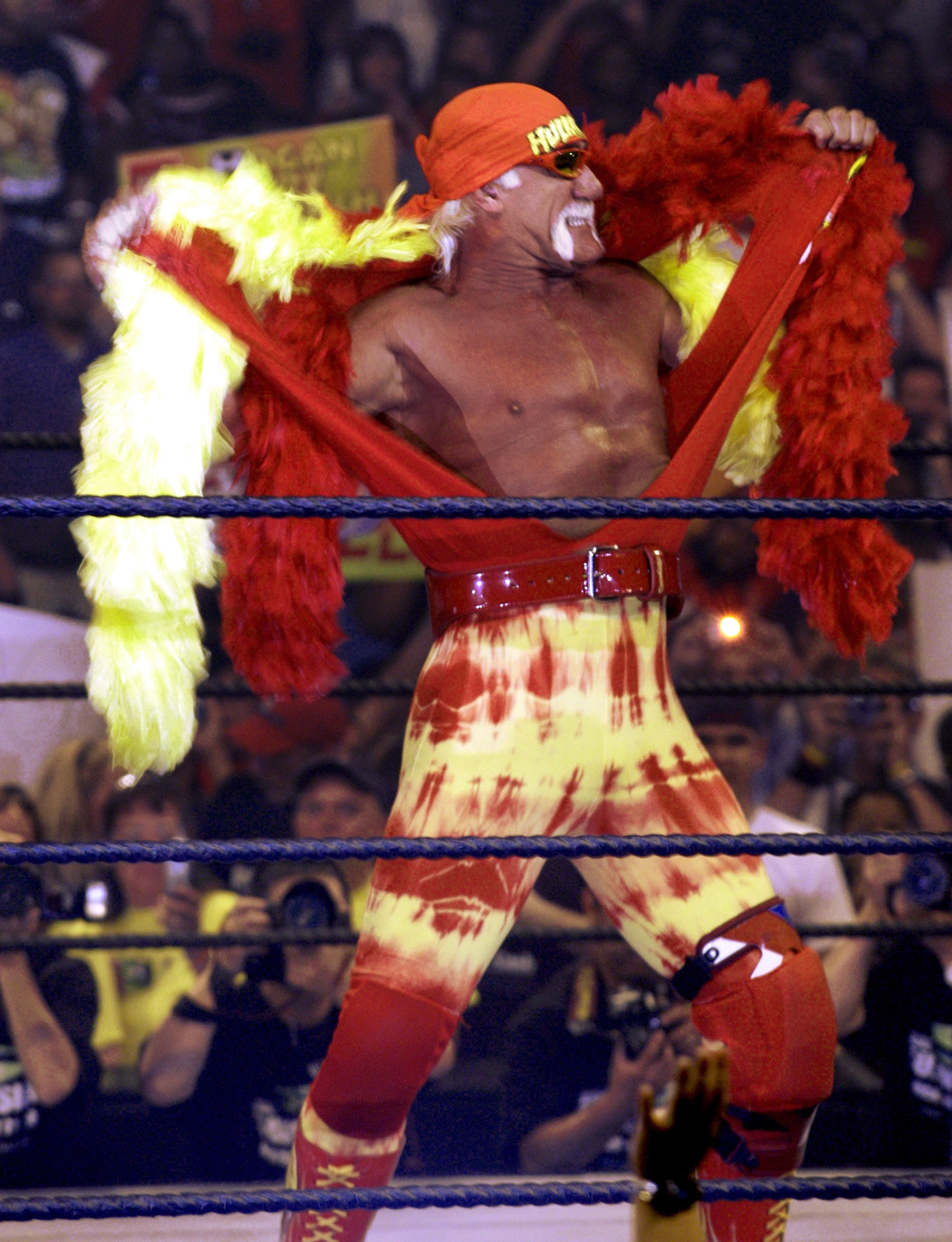
Hogan making his entrance at SummerSlam in 2005

Before WrestleMania 22 in 2006, Hogan inducted Gene Okerlund into the WWE Hall of Fame. He returned at Saturday Night's Main Event XXXIII alongside Brooke Hogan, where he was attacked by Randy Orton. Hogan later defeated Orton at SummerSlam. This marked Hogan's final WWE match, despite later talks of a potential bout with John Cena at WrestleMania 25 which ultimately fell through.

=== Independent circuit (2007, 2009) ===
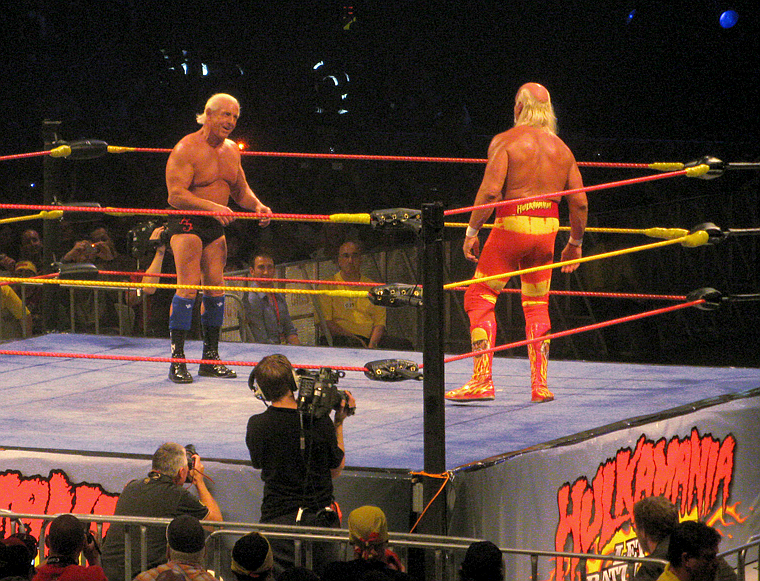
Hogan facing Ric Flair on the Hulkamania Tour

During this time Hogan was invited to join Memphis Wrestling to face Jerry Lawler. Although the match had been promoted for months, contractual obligations prevented Lawler from participating, and he was replaced by Paul Wight. Hogan defeated Wight at the PMG Clash of Legends event on April 27, 2007.

Throughout November 2009, Hogan performed in an independent wrestling tour across Australia titled Hulkamania: Let The Battle Begin. The main event of each show was a rematch between Hogan and Ric Flair, with Hogan winning each match.

=== Total Nonstop Action Wrestling (2009–2013) ===
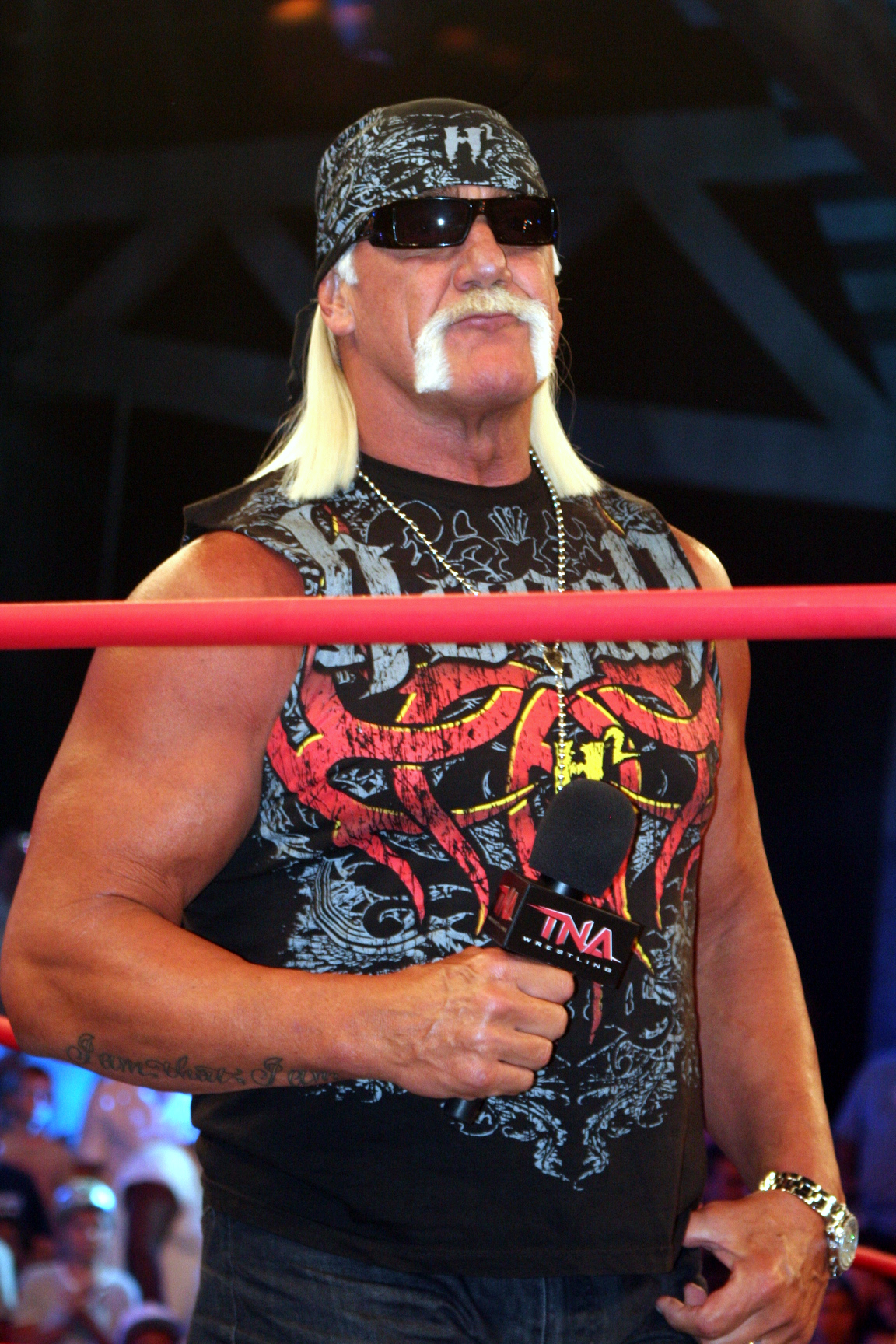
Hogan in July 2010

On October 27, 2009, it was announced that Hogan had signed with Total Nonstop Action Wrestling (TNA). Hogan debuted on the January 4, 2010, episode of Impact! alongside Eric Bischoff in an executive role. Over the next few weeks, Hogan began an on-screen mentorship with Abyss, and the two teamed to defeat A.J. Styles and Ric Flair in Hogan's first TNA match on the March 8 episode of Impact!. At Lockdown on April 18, Team Hogan (Abyss, Jeff Jarrett, Jeff Hardy and Rob Van Dam) defeated Team Flair (Sting, Desmond Wolfe, Robert Roode and James Storm) in a Lethal Lockdown match.

After months of storylines involving speculation about a secretive controlling force in TNA, Hogan turned heel by helping Hardy win the TNA World Heavyweight Championship at Bound for Glory on October 10, forming Immortal with Hardy, Bischoff, Abyss and Jarrett. As part of the angle, it was revealed on the October 14 episode of Impact! that Bischoff had tricked TNA President Dixie Carter into signing paperwork to turn the company over to him and Hogan. The storyline concluded at Bound for Glory on October 16, 2011, when Hogan lost to Sting in a match that returned control of TNA to Carter. After the match, Hogan aided Sting during a post-match attack by members of Immortal, marking his return to a fan favorite role.

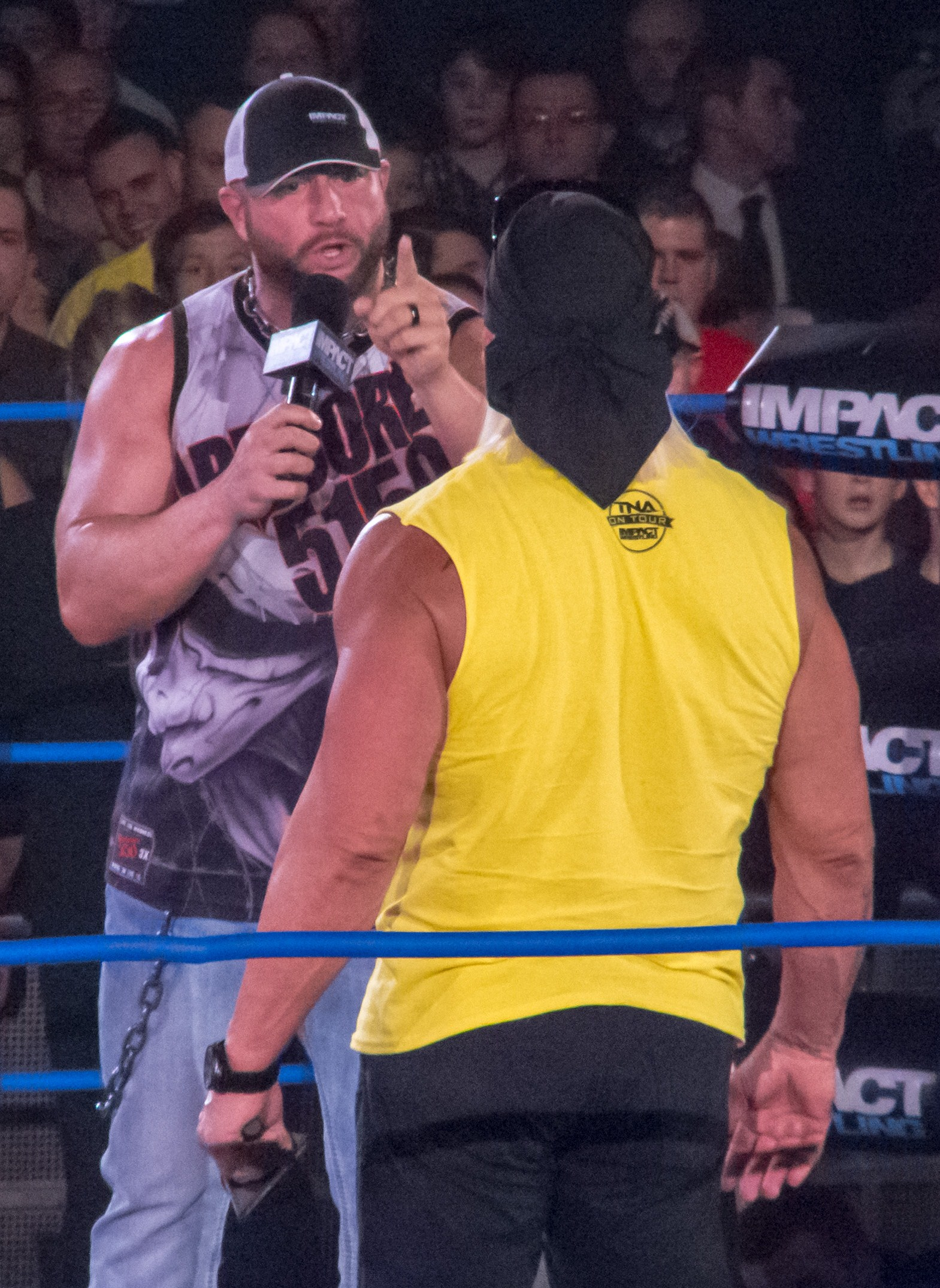
Bully Ray addresses Hogan in Wembley, England in January 2013

Hogan wrestled his final matches during TNA's tour of the United Kingdom, on January 26 and 27, 2012, at house shows in Nottingham and Manchester, where he, James Storm and Sting defeated Bobby Roode, Bully Ray and Kurt Angle in a six-man tag team main event at both events. Two months later, Hogan assumed the role of TNA's on-screen general manager. His last major storyline in TNA was with the mysterious masked group Aces & Eights; the storyline included an angle where Bully Ray was in a relationship with his daughter Brooke, culminating at Lockdown on March 10, 2013, where Ray was revealed to be the leader of Aces & Eights. Hogan left TNA in October 2013 upon the expiration of his contract. His final appearance was on the October 3 episode of Impact Wrestling.

=== Fourth return to WWE (2014–2015) ===
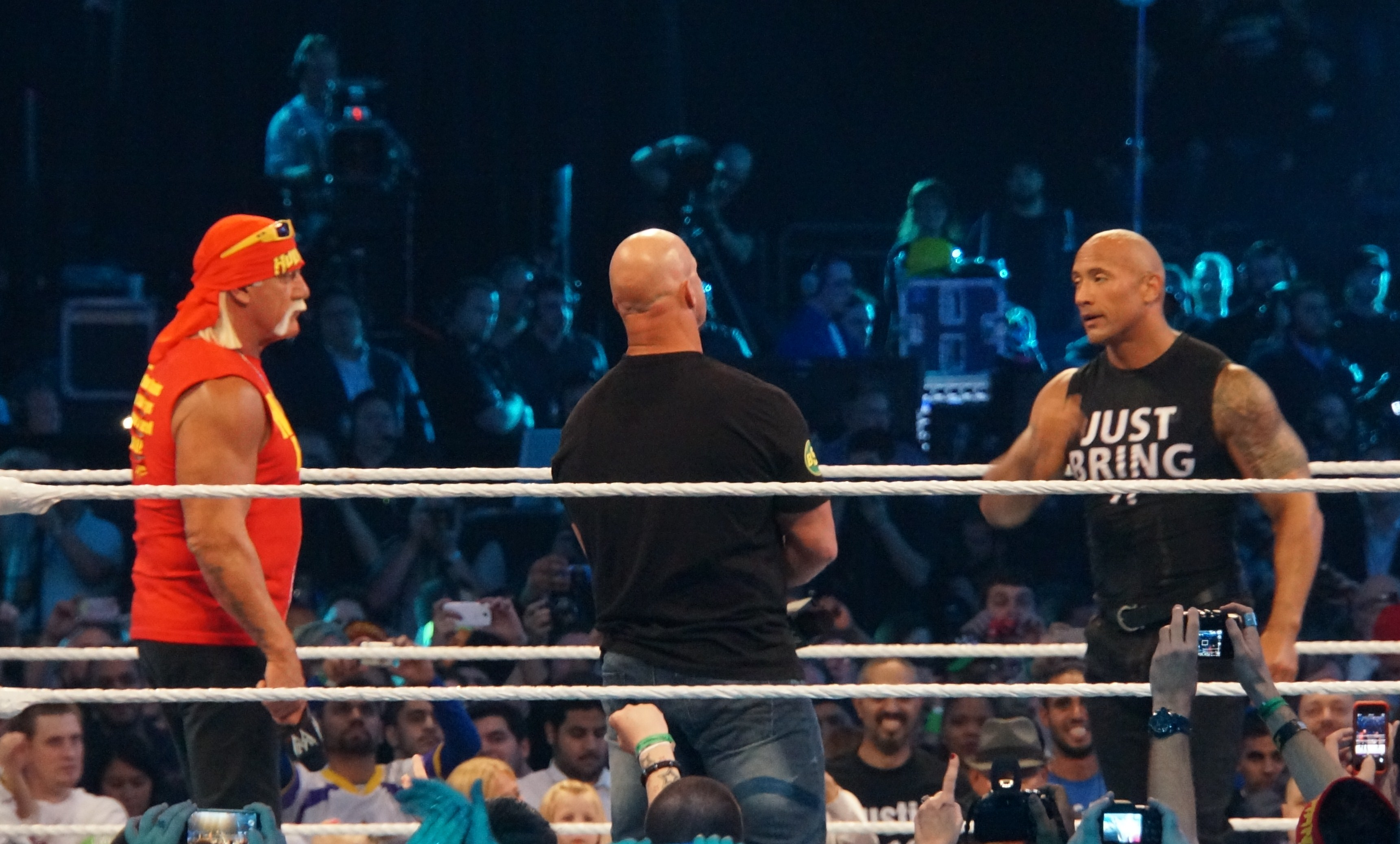
Hogan (left) alongside Stone Cold Steve Austin and The Rock at WrestleMania XXX in April 2014

Hogan returned to WWE in early 2014, appearing on Raw to promote the WWE Network on February 24, and alongside Arnold Schwarzenegger and Joe Manganiello on March 24. During WrestleMania XXX, Hogan served as the host, making several appearances throughout the night.

WWE honored Hogan's career during a live event at Madison Square Garden dubbed "Hulk Hogan Appreciation Night" with a special commemorative banner hanging from the rafters on February 27, 2015. The following month, he appeared on the March 23 episode of Raw in a segment with Snoop Dogg and Curtis Axel. Hogan posthumously inducted "Macho Man" Randy Savage into the WWE Hall of Fame class of 2015 three days later. The next night at WrestleMania 31, Hogan, Scott Hall and Kevin Nash, representing the nWo, interfered in the Sting–Triple H match on behalf of Sting, where they battled D-Generation X (DX) members Billy Gunn, X-Pac, Road Dogg, and Shawn Michaels.

==== Racism scandal and departure ====
In July 2015, National Enquirer and Radar Online publicized an anti-black rant made by Hogan on a leaked sex tape recorded in 2007. In the recording, he is heard expressing disgust with the notion of his daughter dating a black man, referenced by repeated use of the racial slur "nigger". Hogan also said that he was "a racist, to a point". Once the recordings went public erupting in a media scandal, Hogan apologized for the remarks, which he said is "language that is offensive and inconsistent with [his] own beliefs". Hogan reportedly also used homophobic slurs in the taped conversation. It was later reported that Hogan had used racist language in a 2008 call to his then-imprisoned son, Nick, and also said that he hoped they would not be reincarnated as black males.

On July 24, WWE terminated their contract with Hogan; however, Hogan's lawyer said Hogan chose to resign. In response to the scandal, WWE removed almost all references to Hogan from their website, including his entry from its WWE Hall of Fame page and his merchandise from WWE Shop. Hogan's characters were removed from WWE video games, Mattel halted production of his action figures, and retailers including Target, Toys "R" Us, and Walmart pulled his merchandise from their online stores. Hogan gave an interview with Good Morning America on August 31 in which he pleaded forgiveness for his racist comments, attributing these to a racial bias inherited from his neighborhood while growing up. Hogan said that the term "nigger" was used liberally among friends in Tampa; former neighbors disputed this.

The scandal spurred a range of responses from across the professional wrestling industry. Hogan received some support from his African-American peers. Virgil, Dennis Rodman and Kamala each spoke positively about their experiences with Hogan and did not believe he was racist. Other black wrestlers working in the WWE made more critical comments, including Mark Henry, who said he was pleased by WWE's "no tolerance approach to racism" response and that he was hurt and offended by Hogan's manner and tone. Booker T said he was shocked and called the statements unfortunate. In the time that followed, numerous African-Americans associated with wrestling expressed some level of support for Hogan including: Rodman, The Rock, Booker T Kamala, Virgil, Mr. T, Henry, and Big E.

=== Fifth return to WWE (2018–2025) ===
Hogan returned to the WWE in 2018, and apologized to WWE wrestlers in a backstage statement. Several African-American wrestlers, including The New Day, Titus O'Neil, Mark Henry, Shelton Benjamin and JTG doubted the sincerity of Hogan's apology, due to Hogan warning wrestlers to be "mindful about being recorded without their knowledge" during his apology instead of addressing his comments. On July 15, 2018, he was reinstated into the WWE Hall of Fame. Vince McMahon stated, "I knew he wasn't racist. ... He said some racist things. He should pay for that, and he did." Hogan made his on-screen return on November 2, 2018, as the host of Crown Jewel. On January 7, 2019, Hogan returned to Raw to present a tribute to Gene Okerlund, who had died five days prior.

During the following years, Hogan appeared on several WWE events, like the 2019 and 2020 Hall of Fame ceremonies, where he inducted Brutus Beefcake in 2019 and was inducted for a second time as part of the New World Order (with Scott Hall, Kevin Nash and Sean Waltman) in 2020. He also hosted the 35th and 37th editions of WrestleMania, along with Alexa Bliss and Titus O'Neil respectively. He also participated at Crown Jewel 2019, where he was the captain of a team opposing Ric Flair's team. On January 23, 2023, Hogan appeared on RAW's 30th anniversary show. On January 6, 2025, Hogan made his final appearance at a professional wrestling event during the Raw debut on Netflix, where alongside Jimmy Hart he cut a promo advertising his Real American Beer. Hogan was heavily booed by the crowd, which received widespread coverage in the media.

== Endorsements and business ventures ==
=== Food, beverage, restaurants and wrestling shops ===
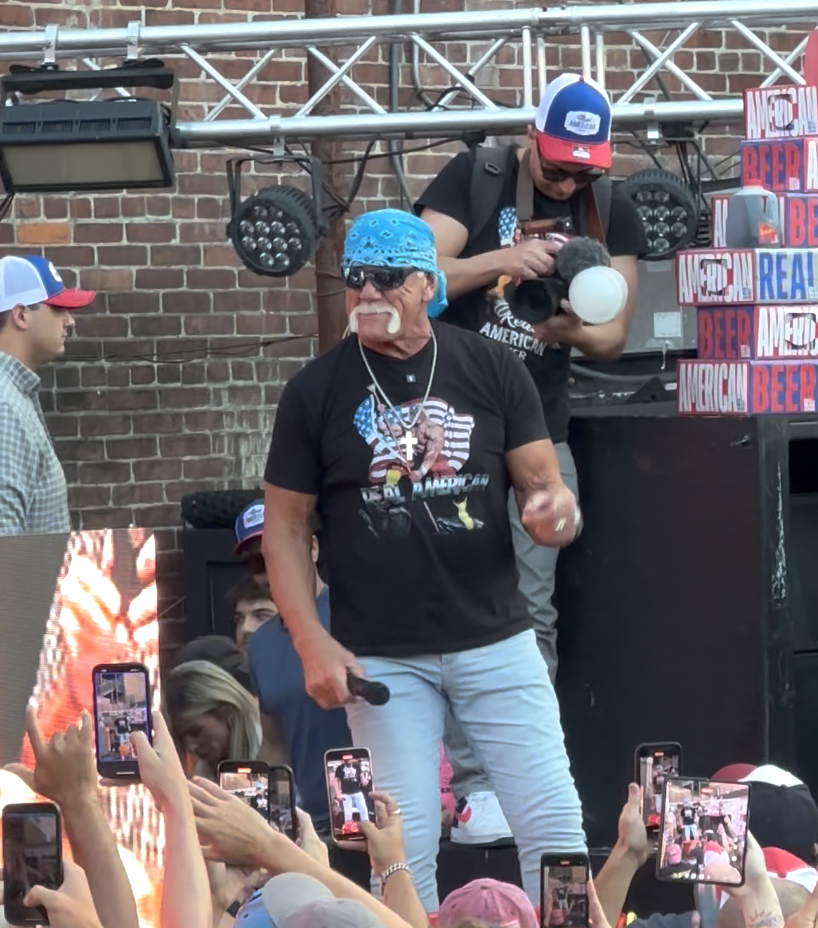
Hogan promoting Real American Beer at the Ohio State bar Midway on High in 2024

Hogan created and financed a restaurant called Pastamania located in the Mall of America in Bloomington, Minnesota. It opened on the Labor Day weekend of 1995 and was heavily promoted on WCW's live show Monday Nitro. The restaurant, which remained in operation for less than a year, featured such dishes as Hulk-U's and Hulk-A-Roos. In the 1990s, Hogan endorsed a blender, known as the Hulk Hogan Thunder Mixer. He later endorsed a grill known as The Hulk Hogan Ultimate Grill, voluntarily recalled as a fire hazard in 2008 along with other QVC and Tristar grills.

In 2006, Hogan unveiled Hogan Energy, a drink distributed by Socko Energy. His name and likeness were also applied to a line of microwavable hamburgers, cheeseburgers, and chicken sandwiches sold at Wal-Mart called Hulkster Burgers. On November 1, 2011, Hogan launched a website called Hogan Nutrition featuring many nutritional and dietary products.

On New Year's Eve 2012, Hogan opened a beachfront restaurant called Hogan's Beach near Tampa, Florida. The restaurant dropped Hogan's name in October 2015. Hogan later opened Hogan's Hangout in Clearwater Beach. In 2017, Hogan opened a memorabilia store in Orlando. A second store was opened in New York City in 2024, and a third opened in Pigeon Forge in 2025, shortly before his death. In 2024, Hogan launched Real American Beer, a light beer brand.

=== Politics ===
In 2008, Hogan endorsed Barack Obama for president. In 2011, he recanted his endorsement after Obama used Hogan's "Real American" theme song without his permission during that year's White House Correspondents' Dinner. Hogan endorsed Mitt Romney in the 2012 United States presidential election. In the leadup to the 2016 United States presidential election, Hogan said he wanted to be Donald Trump's pick for vice president. Hogan formally endorsed Trump for president at the 2024 Republican National Convention. He also spoke at the 2024 Trump rally at Madison Square Garden.

=== Other ===
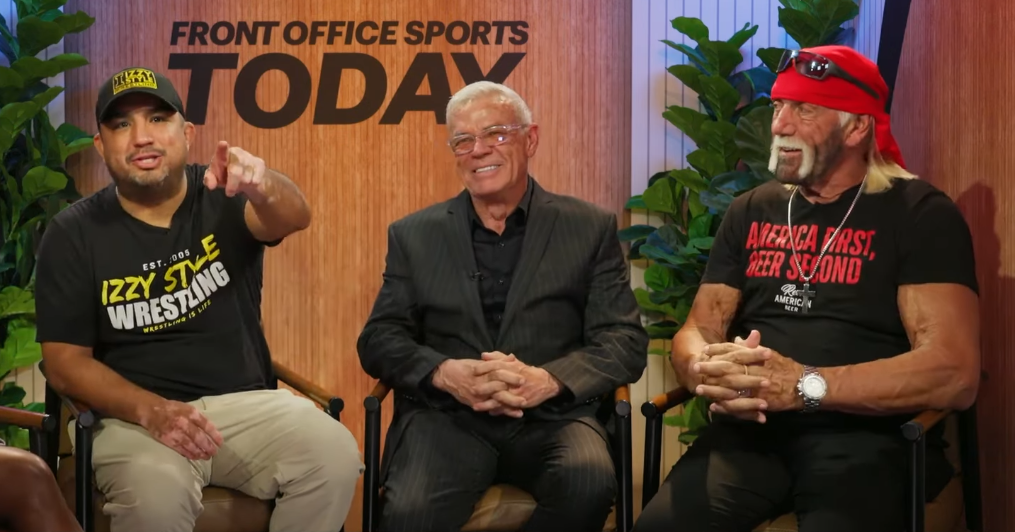
RAF COO Izzy Martinez (left), CMO Eric Bischoff, and co-founder Hulk Hogan during their May 2025 press tour

In October 2007, Hogan transferred all trademarks referring to himself to his liability company named Hogan Holdings Limited. The trademarks include Hulk Hogan, "Hollywood" Hulk Hogan, Hulkster, Hogan Knows Grillin, Hulkamania.com, and Hulkapedia.com. In April 2008, Hogan announced that he would license Gameloft to create a Hulkamania Wrestling video game for mobile phones. In 2010, Hogan starred alongside Troy Aikman in commercials for Rent-A-Center. On March 24, 2011, Hogan made an appearance on American Idol, surprising Paul McDonald and James Durbin, who were both wrestling fans. On October 15, 2010, Endemol Games UK announced Hulk Hogan's Hulkamania, an online gambling game featuring video footage of Hogan.

In October 2013, Hogan partnered with Tech Assets, Inc. to open a web hosting service called Hostamania. A commercial video promoting the service featured Hogan parodying Jean-Claude Van Damme's GoDaddy.com commercials and Miley Cyrus' "Wrecking Ball" music video. Hogan became a distributor for multi-level marketing company ViSalus Sciences after looking for business opportunities outside of wrestling. Hogan supported the American Diabetes Association. In 2019, it was announced that Chris Hemsworth would portray Hogan in a biopic, directed by Todd Phillips. However, plans for the film had been scrapped by 2024. Hogan co-founded Real American Freestyle (RAF) with Chad Bronstein and Terri Francis in April 2025, and he served as the promotion's commissioner.

== Other media ==
=== Acting ===
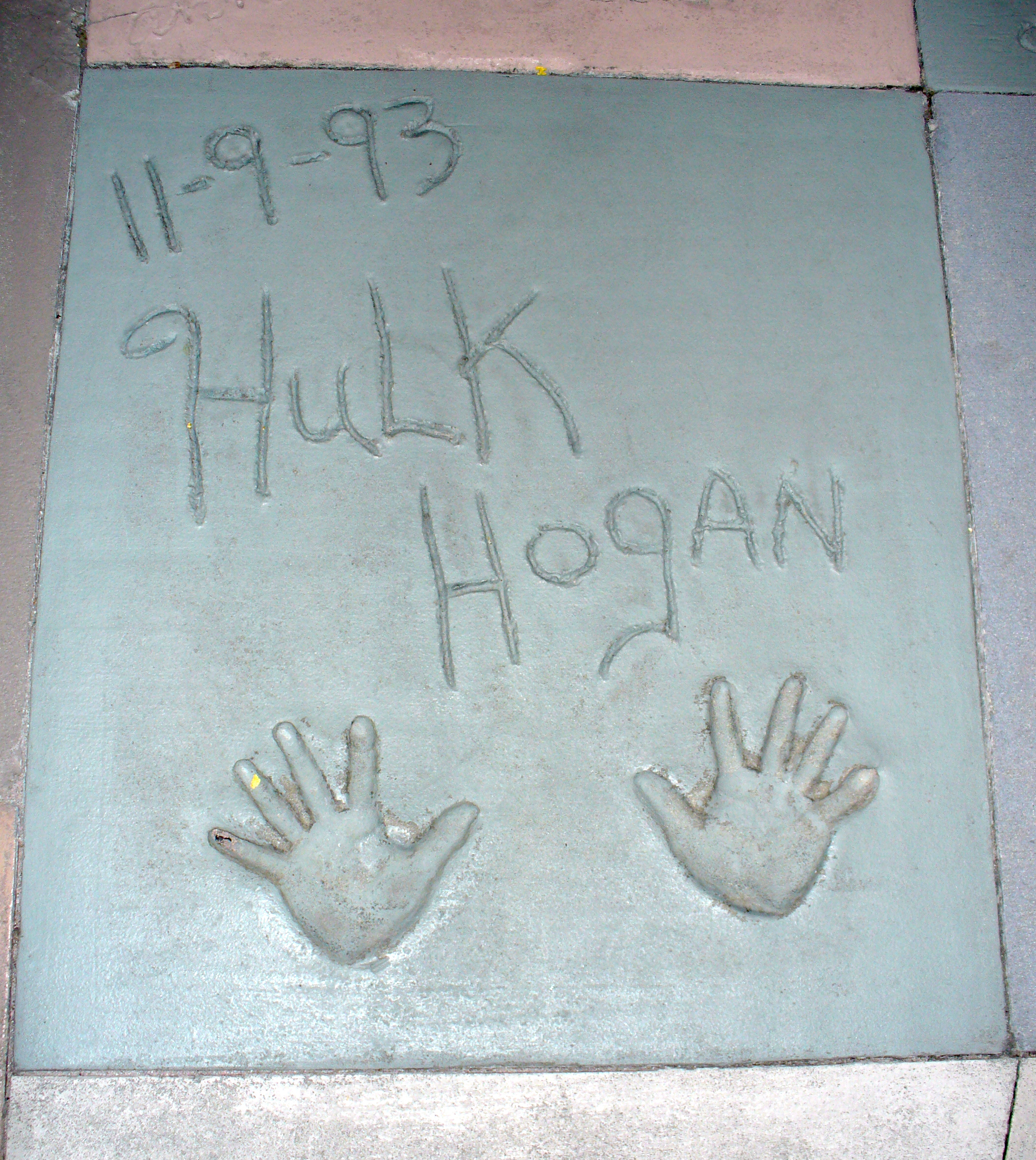
The handprints of Hulk Hogan in front of The Great Movie Ride at Walt Disney World's Disney's Hollywood Studios theme park

Hogan's crossover popularity led to several television and film roles. Early in his career Hogan played the part of Thunderlips in Rocky III (1982). He also appeared in No Holds Barred (1989), before starring in family films Suburban Commando (1991), Mr. Nanny (1993), Santa with Muscles (1996), and 3 Ninjas: High Noon at Mega Mountain (1998). Hogan also appeared in 1992 commercials for Right Guard deodorant. He starred in his own television series, Thunder in Paradise, in 1994. He is the star of The Ultimate Weapon (1998), in which Brutus Beefcake also appears in a cameo.

In 1997, Hogan starred in the TNT original film Assault on Devil's Island, as the leader of a commando unit featuring fellow genre veterans Carl Weathers and Shannon Tweed. Eric Bischoff was also listed as an executive producer. The characters were considered for a regular series, but instead received a second feature-length showcase two years later, called Assault on Death Mountain.

In 1995, he appeared on TBN's Kids Against Crime. Hogan made cameo appearances in Muppets from Space, Gremlins 2: The New Batch (the theatrical cut) and Spy Hard as himself. Hogan played the role of Zeus in Little Hercules in 3D. Hogan made two appearances on The A-Team in 1985 and 1986, along with Roddy Piper. He appeared on Suddenly Susan in 1999. Hogan voiced "The Dean" in the 2011 animated show China, IL.

=== Reality television and hosting ===
In July 2005, VH1 premiered Hogan Knows Best a reality show which centered around Hogan, his then-wife Linda, and their children Brooke and Nick. In July 2008, a spin-off entitled Brooke Knows Best premiered, which focused primarily on Hogan's daughter Brooke. In 2008, Hogan hosted the comeback series of American Gladiators on NBC. He also hosted and judged the short-lived reality show, Hulk Hogan's Celebrity Championship Wrestling. Hogan had a special titled Finding Hulk Hogan on A&E on November 17, 2010. In 2015, Hogan was a judge on the sixth season of Tough Enough, alongside Paige and Daniel Bryan, but due to that year's Hogan scandal, he was replaced by The Miz.

=== Music and radio ===
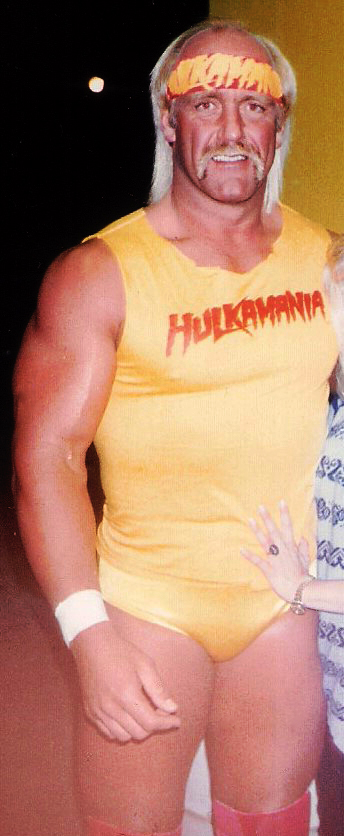
Hulk Hogan in 1988

Hogan released a music CD, Hulk Rules, as Hulk Hogan and the Wrestling Boot Band, which also included Jimmy "Mouth of the South" Hart, his then-wife Linda and J.J Maguire. Despite negative reviews, Hulk Rules reached No. 12 on the Billboard Top Kid Audio chart in 1995. One of the songs, "Hulkster in Heaven", was purportedly written about murder victim James Bulger. Hogan and Green Jellÿ in 1993 performed a cover version of Gary Glitter's song "I'm the Leader of the Gang (I Am)". In the 1980s, Hogan appeared in the music video for Dolly Parton's wrestling-themed love song "Headlock on My Heart" for Parton's show Dolly. Hogan was a regular guest on Bubba the Love Sponge's radio show. He also served as the best man at Bubba's January 2007 wedding. On March 12, 2010, Hogan hosted his own radio show titled Hogan Uncensored, on Sirius Satellite Radio's Howard 101.

=== Merchandising ===
The Wrestling Figure Checklist records Hogan as having 171 different action figures, produced between the 1980s and 2010s from numerous manufacturers and promotions.

=== Video games ===
Hogan provided his voice for the 2011 game Saints Row: The Third as Angel de la Muerte, a member of the Saints. In October 2011, he released a video game called Hulk Hogan's Main Event.

== Legal issues and controversies ==
=== Firearm possession ===
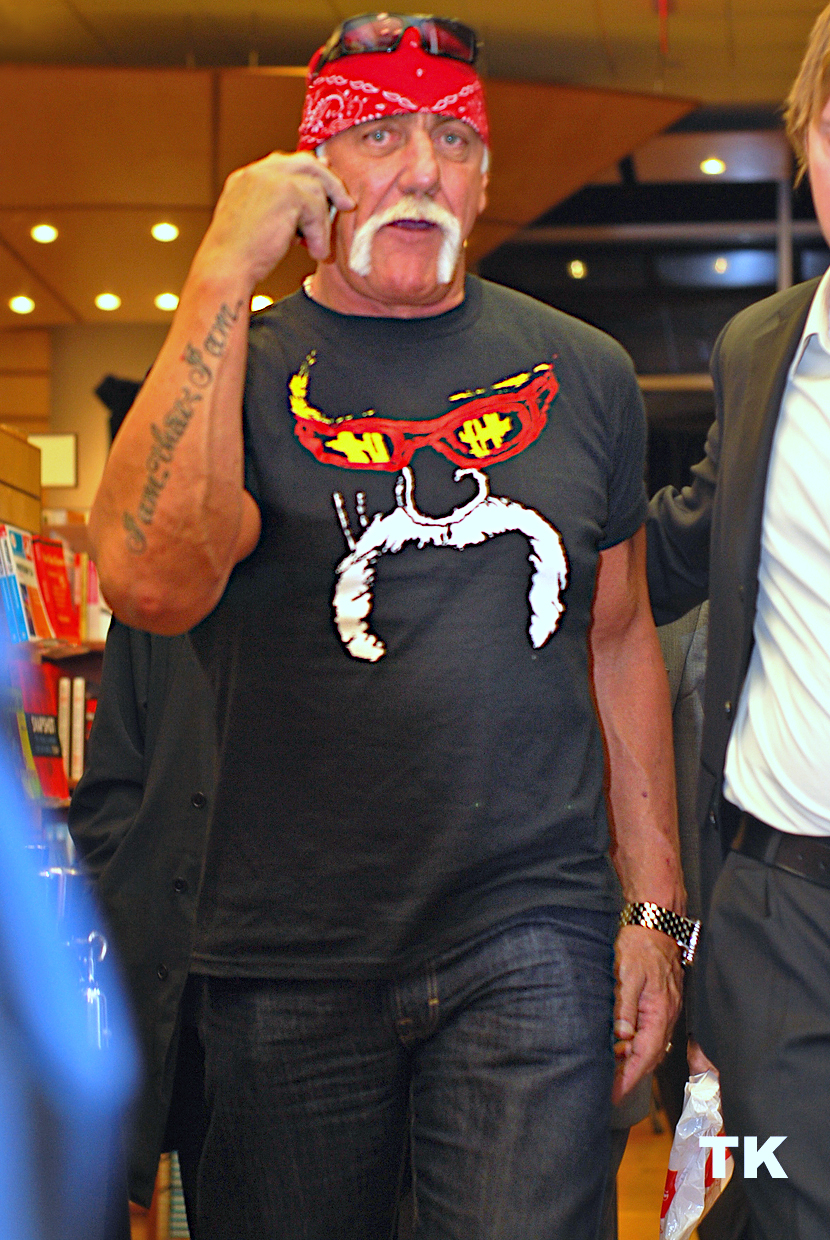
Hogan in Toronto in 2009

In 1980, Hogan was arrested in New Jersey for possession of a firearm. He entered into a pretrial intervention program, then served six months' probation resulting in the felony charge being dropped.

=== Marvel Comics trademark agreement ===
In 1984, similarities between Hogan and Marvel Comics' Incredible Hulk led to a legal agreement. Titan Sports, Marvel, and Hogan signed a deal granting Marvel the trademarks to "Hulk Hogan", "Hulkster", and "Hulkamania" for 20 years. As part of the agreement, the WWF could no longer refer to Hogan as "The Incredible Hulk" or "Hulk", or use purple and green in his presentation. Marvel also received 0.9% of Hogan-related merchandise revenue, $100 per match, and 10% of Hogan's other earnings under the name. This agreement would carry over into Hogan's time in WCW, which by 1996, had become a sister company to Marvel rival DC Comics through their parent company Time Warner. Hogan was using the "Hollywood Hogan" persona at that time, avoiding potential legal conflicts. In reference to the dispute, a story in 1988's Marvel Comics Presents #45 had a panel where a wrestler resembling Hogan was tossed through an arena roof by the Incredible Hulk as he had "picked the wrong name."

=== Belzer lawsuit ===
On March 27, 1985, Richard Belzer requested on his cable television talk show Hot Properties that Hogan demonstrate one of his signature wrestling moves. Hogan put Belzer in a modified guillotine choke, which caused Belzer to pass out. When Hogan released him, Belzer hit his head on the floor, sustaining a laceration to the scalp that required a brief hospitalization. Belzer sued Hogan for $5 million and later settled out of court. In 2006, it was claimed that the settlement totaled $5 million, half from Hogan and half from Vince McMahon. However, Belzer suggested that the settlement amount was closer to $400,000.

=== Steroid usage and testimony in McMahon trial ===
In 1991, on The Arsenio Hall Show, Hogan denied using steroids, stating "I trained 20 years two hours a day to look like I do. But the things that I'm not, I am not a steroid abuser and I do not use steroids." Billy Graham, a fellow wrestler, in a 1991 interview on Inside Edition, stated that he injected Hogan with steroids in the 1980s. In 1993, media reports indicated that Hogan was a heavy steroid user.

In 1994, Hogan, having received legal immunity, testified in the trial of Vince McMahon relating to shipments of steroids received by both parties from WWF physician George T. Zahorian III. Under oath, Hogan admitted that he had used anabolic steroids since 1976 to gain size and weight, but that McMahon had neither sold him the drugs nor ordered him to take them. The evidence given by Hogan proved extremely costly to the government's case against McMahon. Due to this and jurisdictional issues, McMahon was found not guilty.

During his testimony, Hogan said that he and King Kong Bundy had gone to McMahon to tip him off over Jesse Ventura's unionization efforts in 1986. Hogan later stated "Vince already knew about it, I just said I didn't think it was a good idea. [Ventura] was running his mouth like usual, trying to get everyone on board, everyone knew". This led to criticism; no professional wrestlers' union has been established.

=== Sexual assault allegation and extortion lawsuit ===
In January 1996, Hogan was accused of sexual assault by a 29-year-old businesswoman on Labor Day weekend in 1995, at the first WCW Nitro taping at the Mall of America in Minneapolis. Gene Okerlund claimed he was with Hogan the whole day and denied the allegations. The woman and her lawyer sent Hogan a letter offering to settle the case financially before making it public, and Hogan sued for extortion. The woman filed a counter-suit against Hogan in 1997.

=== Gawker lawsuit ===
In 2012, Gawker released a short clip of a sex tape between Hogan and Heather Clem, the estranged wife of radio personality Bubba the Love Sponge. Hogan stated that the tape was made without his knowledge or consent, and he sued Bubba and Heather Clem for invading his privacy on October 15, 2012. A settlement with Bubba was announced later that month, who subsequently issued a public apology. In a lawsuit financed by Silicon Valley billionaire Peter Thiel, Hogan also sued Gawker for $100 million for defamation, loss of privacy, and emotional pain. In 2015, clips from the tape with Hogan using slurs led to Hogan departing WWE. After a 2016 trial, Hogan was awarded $115 million. Also, on August 11, 2016, a Florida judge gave Hogan control of the assets of A. J. Daulerio, former Gawker editor-in-chief, who was involved in the posting of Hogan's sex tape. Gawker ultimately reached a $31 million settlement with Hogan in November 2016.

=== Alleged fabrications ===
Hogan was accused multiple times of fabricating elements of his past. The Independent called Hogan "a great believer in self-mythologising". According to The Independent, Hogan claimed that Elvis Presley was a big fan of his, although Hogan had been a professional wrestler for less than a week at the time of Presley's death. Hogan once claimed that the "difference in time zones" flying between the United States and Japan caused him to wrestle "400 days in a single year".

After Survivor Series in 1991, Hogan accused The Undertaker of injuring his neck with a Tombstone piledriver. The Undertaker later denied injuring Hogan, stating he had performed the move safely. In 2009, Hogan claimed that both the Rolling Stones and Metallica wanted him to play bass guitar for them. Metallica singer James Hetfield and Rolling Stones singer Mick Jagger have both denied Hogan's claim. Hogan also claimed that he turned down advances from both Cher and Madonna.

In 2014, Hogan claimed that a missed phone call resulted in him missing an opportunity to endorse what became the George Foreman Grill. Foreman's son later said Hogan was not considered. In 2010, Hogan said that he was offered the starring role in the film The Wrestler but turned it down. Director Darren Aronofsky later said he never considered Hogan. Hogan claimed in a radio interview to have a 10-inch (25 cm) penis; however, during the Gawker trial, he admitted this was not true, stating he was speaking in character.

== Personal life ==
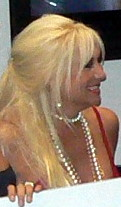
Linda Hogan

In 1983, Hogan married his first wife, Linda Claridge. They had two children: a daughter, Brooke, and a son, Nick. On November 20, 2007, Linda filed for divorce, stating publicly that she decided to end her marriage after discovering that Hogan had an affair. Hogan denied ever cheating on Linda, and stated if he could change one thing in his life it would be to "get divorced right after Nick was born". In the divorce settlement, Hogan retained around 30% of the couple's liquid assets, totaling around $10 million. Hogan said he contemplated suicide after the divorce and credited American Gladiators co-star Laila Ali with preventing it.

Hogan began a relationship with Jennifer McDaniel in early 2008. The two were engaged in November 2009 and married on December 14, 2010, in Clearwater, Florida. The couple divorced in 2021. Hogan became engaged to yoga instructor Sky Daily in July 2023, proposing to her at actor Corin Nemec's wedding reception. They married on September 22, 2023.

Hogan had two grandchildren through Brooke who were born in January 2025. Due to their estrangement he had not met them by the time he died in July 2025. Although Sky was listed in Hogan's will as his "surviving spouse", his son Nick was the only person named in Hogan's will as a beneficiary.

=== Religious beliefs ===
Hogan was public about his Christian faith, stating that he was "saved" at the age of 14 and had "leaned on" his religion throughout his life. Hogan attributed his salvation to the Youth Ranches of Hank Lindstrom, where he would specifically emphasize John 3:16 and salvation by faith alone. He and his wife, Sky Daily, were baptized at Indian Rocks Baptist Church in Largo, Florida on December 20, 2023. However, his wife Sky's family are Scientologists, which contributed to Hogan's daughter Brooke distancing herself from the family, due to fear of the church's litigious nature.

=== Health issues ===
Hogan suffered numerous health issues, particularly with his back, since retiring as a wrestler following years of heavy weight-training and jolting as a wrestler. He underwent at least 25 medical procedures, including back surgeries, and knee and hip replacements. After the procedures failed to cure his back problems, Hogan underwent traditional spinal fusion surgery in December 2010, which enabled him to return to his professional activities. In January 2013, Hogan filed a medical malpractice lawsuit against the Laser Spine Institute for $50 million, saying that the medical firm persuaded him to undergo a half-dozen "unnecessary and ineffective" spinal operations that worsened his back problems. He claimed that the six procedures he underwent over a period of 19 months only gave him short-term relief. In addition, the Laser Spine Institute used his name on their advertisements, which Hogan claimed was without his permission. The Laser Spine Institute shut down in 2019. In July 2025, Brooke Hogan stated that Hogan's health had already been declining in 2023, and that he had undergone numerous surgeries by that point in time.

== Death ==
On May 14, 2025, Hogan underwent a four-level anterior cervical discectomy and fusion operation. During the procedure, Hogan's phrenic nerve, which helps the diaphragm contract and expand to allow the lungs to inhale and exhale air, was severed. Close friends Jimmy Hart and Eric Bischoff noted a rapid decline in Hogan's health following his neck fusion surgery. Hart shared that Hogan avoided visitors to prevent infection, while Bischoff recalled Hogan sounding weak and expressing embarrassment over his condition. On June 18, 2025, radio host Bubba the Love Sponge reported that Hogan was seriously ill in the hospital and "might not make it".

Hogan died at his Clearwater, Florida, home on the morning of July 24, 2025, at the age of 71. He collapsed while doing therapy after returning home from the hospital, and was taken by paramedics to Morton Plant Hospital, where he was pronounced dead at 11:17 am. His official cause of death was acute myocardial infarction (a heart attack). His medical records later revealed he had also had chronic lymphocytic leukemia and atrial fibrillation. In June 2026, a report of an investigation into Hogan's death by the Clearwater Police Department was released where it was determined that he died of natural causes and that his health had been very poor since he had a spinal fusion surgery on his neck approximately six weeks before his death.

On August 5, 2025, Hogan's first funeral service was held at Indian Rocks Baptist Church in Largo, Florida with widow Sky Daily, ex-wife Linda Hogan, Jimmy Hart, Eric Bischoff, Hacksaw Jim Duggan, Kevin Nash, Paul Wight, Ted DiBiase, Sting, Lex Luger, Vince McMahon, Triple H, Stephanie McMahon, Ric Flair, Dennis Rodman, Kid Rock, Theo Von, Bam Margera, Tito Ortiz, Dean Malenko, and Brutus Beefcake among those in attendance. Hogan's daughter Brooke, who was estranged from her father since 2023, did not attend his funeral services. Following another funeral service which was held at Sylvan Abbey Memorial Park & Funeral Home in Clearwater, Florida, Hogan was cremated. Nick Hogan was named as the sole heir of his estate and took over his role as commissioner of Real American Freestyle.

== Tributes and legacy ==
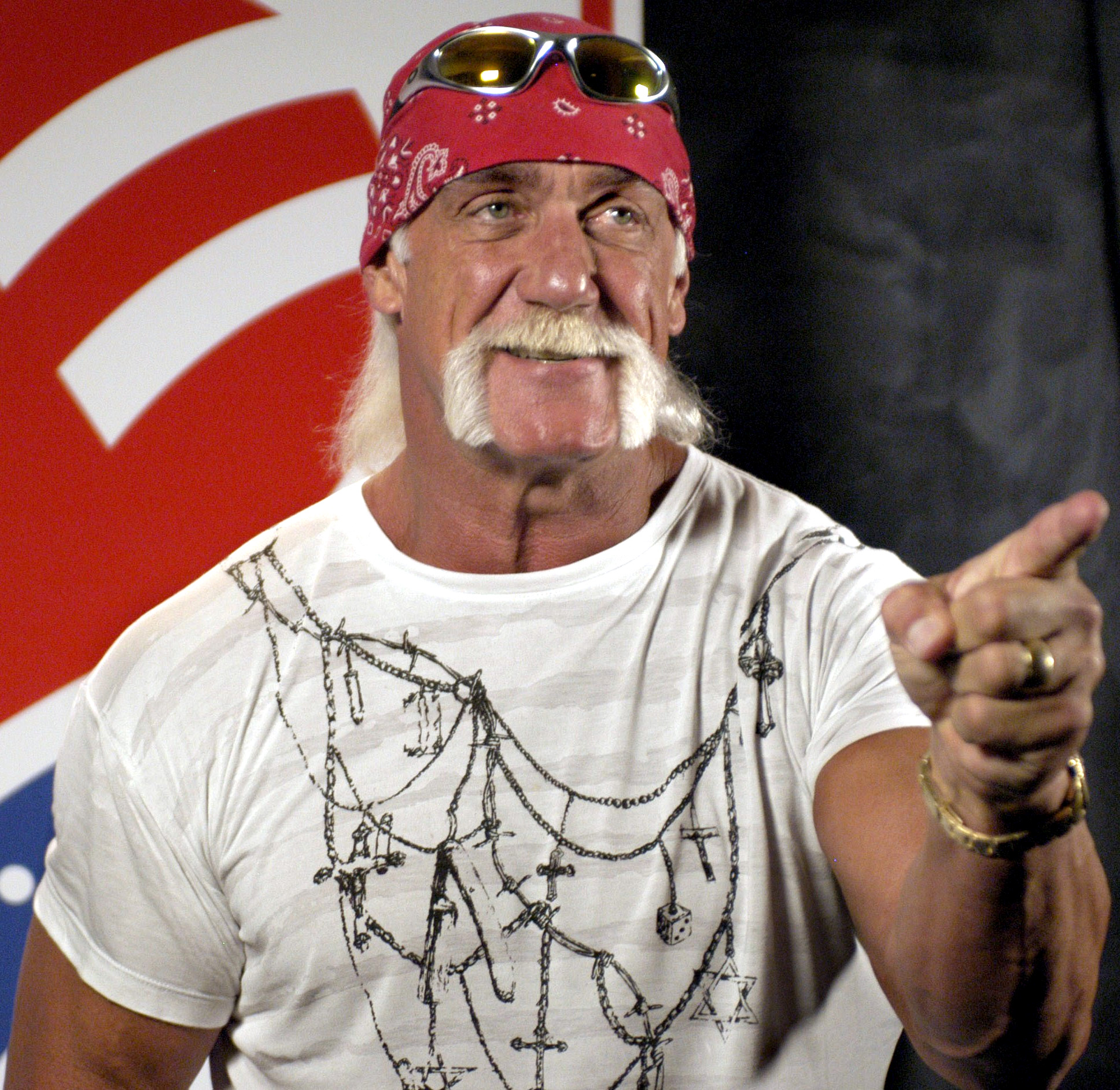
Hogan in August 2005

Hogan has been described as one of the largest attractions in professional wrestling history and a major reason why Vince McMahon's expansion of his promotion worked. Wrestling historian and journalist Dave Meltzer stated: "You can't possibly overrate his significance in the history of the business. And he sold more tickets to wrestling shows than any man who ever lived." Hogan himself had previously said he was the second-greatest wrestler ever, after Ric Flair, although Chris Jericho has stated that Hogan was a better worker than Flair and that working with him was one of the favorite moments of his career. Meanwhile, Cody Rhodes has said numerous times that Hogan's WrestleMania X8 match with The Rock is the greatest match in wrestling history and that it epitomized what professional wrestling is. Bret Hart has issued both praise and criticism for Hogan, lauding his look and describing him as a "hero" to both fans and fellow wrestlers, but calling his in-ring abilities "very limited". Hogan has been ranked as one of the top ten greatest pro wrestlers of all time by both Sports Illustrated and IGN. In 2018, David Levin of Bleacher Report wrote "Hulkamania is the greatest concept ever created in wrestling." Adding, "Hogan made wrestling a national phenomenon in the mid-1980s."

Hogan was named the most requested celebrity of the 1980s for the Make-A-Wish Foundation children's charity. He was featured on the covers of Sports Illustrated (the first and as of 2013, only professional wrestler to do so), TV Guide, and People magazines, while also appearing on The Tonight Show and having his own CBS Saturday morning cartoon titled Hulk Hogan's Rock 'n' Wrestling. He also co-hosted Saturday Night Live on March 30, 1985. AT&T reported that the 900 number information line he ran while with the WWF was the single biggest 900 number from 1991 to 1993. Hogan continued to run a 900 number after joining World Championship Wrestling (WCW).

Following Hogan's death on July 24, 2025, many wrestlers paid tribute to Hogan on social media, such as Vince McMahon, The Rock, The Undertaker, Steve Austin, Rob Van Dam, Shawn Michaels, John Cena, Triple H, Ric Flair, Kane, Sting, Jake Roberts, Ted DiBiase Sr., Kurt Angle, The Miz, and Matt Hardy. Hogan was also remembered by people outside professional wrestling, including actor Sylvester Stallone, UFC President Dana White and U.S. President Donald Trump. Ron DeSantis, governor of Hogan's home state of Florida, declared August 1 as Hulk Hogan Day and ordered flags at the Florida State Capitol flown at half-staff. In October 2025, a waterfront trail in the Florida Gulf Coast city of Clearwater was renamed in Hogan's honor.

WWE honored Hogan with multiple tributes: first with a ten-bell salute, on the July 25 episode of SmackDown; then, on the following episodes of Raw and NXT, and also at SummerSlam. Meanwhile, TNA dedicated its July 24 episode of Impact! to Hogan. In NJPW, Hogan was given a ten-bell salute, as well as a tribute ceremony, during the sixth night of the G1 Climax 35 tournament on July 26. Two days later, Hogan was honored on AEW Collision with a tribute from former WCW commentator Tony Schiavone. At the same time, many commentators noted his complicated legacy due to his backstage politics, his racial comments, and his support for Donald Trump. Mark Henry, who was critical of Hogan following his racism scandal, spoke of his legacy after his death: "Regardless of his shortcomings, it didn't make him less of a wrestler. It didn't make him less of an entertainer. It's never going to take away from his greatness."

In 2026, Hogan's iconic boots from WrestleMania X8, in his match against The Rock, were sold for a record $1,037,000 at Heritage Auctions. During the WrestleMania 42 weekend, the first one since his death, the WWE hosted the "Hulk Hogan Experience" at WWE World, an exhibit featuring multiple photos and pieces of memorabilia from his career.
