= E! True Hollywood Story =

American television documentary series

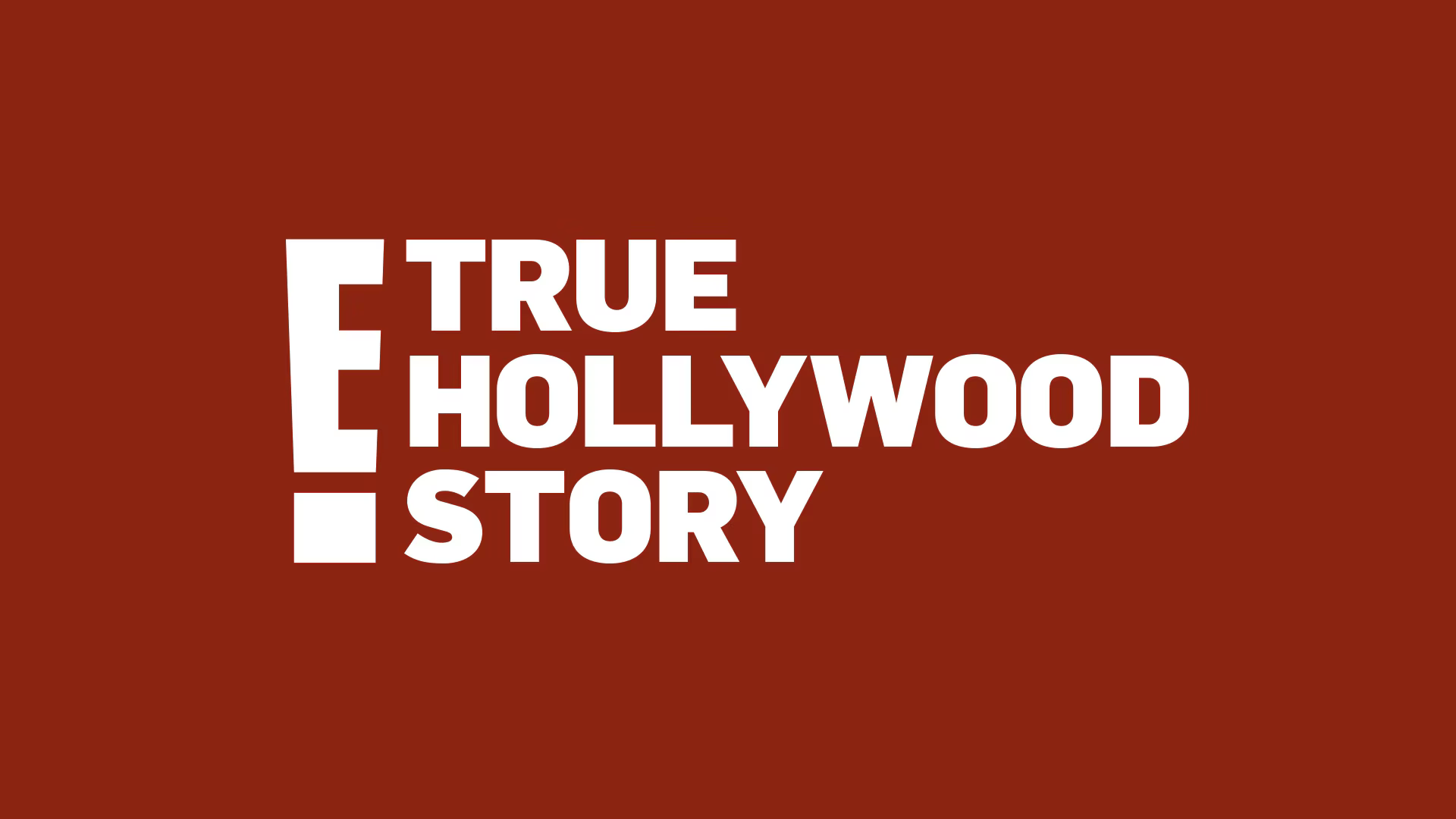
- Starring: Various
- Narrated by: Don Morrow; Neil Ross; Kieran Mulroney; Michael Bell; Chip Bolcik; Phil Crowley; Christina Pickles; Ivan Allen; Beng Spies; Angela Bishop (only in Australia); Nick Omana; Pete Brooks; Mara Junot (2019)
- Country of origin: United States
- No. of seasons: 17
- No. of episodes: 501

Production
- Executive producer: Jeffrey Shore
- Running time: 45–90 minutes
- Production company: Comcast Entertainment Studios

Original release
- Network: E!
- Release: March 29, 1996 – November 22, 2021

E! True Hollywood Story is an American television documentary series on E!

== Overview ==
E! True Hollywood Story originally started as a series of specials beginning on March 29, 1996, but evolved into a weekly biographical documentary series. The regular run as a series began in October 1996. The first True Hollywood Story focused on the murder of Rebecca Schaeffer.

Episodes are either one or two hours long, depending on the topic being covered. There have been more than 500 True Hollywood Stories. On August 22, 2019, it was announced that the series would return on October 6, 2019. On November 12, 2020, the reboot series was renewed for a second season which premiered in 2021.

== List of episodes ==
Unless otherwise indicated, all original airdates are primarily when the episode first aired in the United States

=== Adult industry performers ===
- Bob Guccione (December 19, 1999)
- John Holmes ("John Holmes & Wonderland Murders")
  (June 18, 2000)
- Jenna Jameson (August 10, 2003)
- Traci Lords (August 16, 1998)
- Linda Lovelace (November 5, 2000)
- Ginger Lynn (August 4, 2002)
- Jim and Artie Mitchell
  ("Blood Brothers: Jim & Artie Mitchell") (March 16, 2003)
- Savannah (October 3, 1999)

=== Athletes ===
- Tai Babilonia and Randy Gardner
  ("Tai & Randy") (February 6, 2002)
- Oksana Baiul (February 8, 1998)
- Chris Benoit (Canada: September 3, 2008)
  ("Chris Benoit: Wrestling with Demons") (August 27, 2008)
- Kobe Bryant (November 16, 2003)
- Dave Draper (July 8, 2001)
- Female Bodybuilders (August 19, 2009)
- Rudy Galindo (December 13, 1998)
- Tonya Harding (January 17, 1999)
- Scott Hamilton (January 30, 2000)
- Hulk Hogan (December 19, 1999)
- Bruce Jenner (September 17, 2000)
- Anna Kournikova (August 17, 2003)
  ("Tennis: Anna Kournikova") (October 3, 2009)
- NASCAR: Life in the Fast Lane (May 30, 2005)
- Dennis Rodman (June 13, 1999)
- O. J. Simpson (September 8, 2002)
  (Also: "O.J. Simpson Interview") (August 23, 1998)
  ("OJ, Nicole & Ron: Countdown to Murder") (June 14, 1998)
- Tim Tebow (July 2012)
- Serena and Venus Williams
  ("Williams Sisters") (May 23, 2004)
- Tiger Woods (April 14, 2010)

=== Comedians ===
- John Belushi (May 31, 1998)
- Lenny Bruce (April 25, 1999)
- Brett Butler (August 23, 1999)
- Jim Carrey (September 10, 1998)
  (Canada: August 27, 2008)
- Cheech & Chong (February 20, 2000)
- Ray Combs (November 16, 1997)
- Ellen DeGeneres (January 4, 2004)
  (January 11, 2004)
- Andrew Dice Clay (July 4, 1999)
- Andy Dick (September 15, 2002)
- Phyllis Diller (January 28, 2001)
- Chris Farley (January 10, 1999)
- Redd Foxx (April 25, 1999)
- Gallagher (April 4, 2001)
- Kathy Griffin (October 20, 2007)
- Phil Hartman (September 6, 1998)
- Andy Kaufman (October 25, 1998)
- Sam Kinison (August 31, 1996)
- Martin Lawrence (July 27, 2003)
- Jerry Lewis (May 18, 2003)
- Joe Piscopo (December 19, 2000)
- Paula Poundstone (December 12, 2001)
- Richard Pryor (February 2, 2003)
- Gilda Radner (October 19, 1997)
- Joan Rivers (A parody of her career) (February 22, 2001)
  (April 1, 2001)

=== Couples and families ===
- Alice and Calico Cooper (December 7, 2003)
- The Baldwin Brothers (January 8, 2006)
- Goldie Hawn and Kate Hudson (March 8, 2004)
- Paris and Nicky Hilton
  ("Hilton Sisters") (February 20, 2005)
- Hulk Hogan and Family (November 7, 2008)
  (Linda Hogan, Brooke Hogan & Nick Hogan)
- Whitney Houston and Bobby Brown (February 18, 2001)
- Ice-T and Coco (February 12, 2012)
- Mick Jagger and Jerry Hall (September 5, 1999)
- Jessica, Ashlee, and the Simpson Family (August 7, 2005)
  (Jessica, Ashlee, Joe, and Tina Simpson)
- The Judds (June 6, 2004)
  (Naomi, Wynonna, and Ashley Judd)
- The Kardashians (April 4, 2008)
  (Robert, Sr; Kourtney; Kimberley; Khloé; Robert, Jr.; Bruce Jenner; Kris Jenner; Kendall Jenner and Kylie Jenner)
- The Kennedys
  ("The Kennedys: Power, Seduction and Hollywood") (April 5, 1998)
- Kate and Pippa Middleton
  ("Kate & Pippa") (October 12, 2011)
- The O'Neals (November 18, 2001)
  (Tatum, Ryan, and Griffin O'Neal)
- The Osbournes (May 17, 2007)
  (Ozzy, Sharon, Kelly, and Jack Osbourne)
- Sean Penn and Madonna (August 29, 1999)
- Posh and Becks (February 16, 2008)
- Lionel and Nicole Richie (December 12, 2004)
  (December 14, 2004)
- Joan and Melissa Rivers (May 13, 2012)
- Rick Rockwell and Darva Conger
  ("Rick & Darva: Million Dollar Mistake") (July 9, 2000)
- Arnold Schwarzenegger and Maria Shriver
  ("Arnold & Maria") (February 15, 2004)
- Charlie Sheen and Denise Richards
- Britney Spears and Kevin Federline
  ("Britney & Kevin") (October 9, 2005)
- Rod and Kimberly Stewart (June 11, 2006)
- Steven and Liv Tyler (June 16, 2007)
- Mike Tyson and Robin Givens (June 2, 2002)
- Luke and Owen Wilson (April 11, 2008)
- Kevin Jonas and Danielle Deleasa

=== Criminals ===
- Michael Alig
  ("Death by Disco") (April 16, 2000)
- Casey Anthony (October 19, 2011)
- Christian Brando (June 8, 1997)
- Heidi Fleiss (July 12, 1998)
- Mary Kay Letourneau (January 2, 2005)
- Claudine Longet
  ("Claudine Longet & Spider Sabich") (June 11, 2000)
- The Menendez Brothers (April 29, 2001)
- NXIVM: Self Help or Sex Cult? (October 6, 2019)
- Sam Sheppard
  ("Sam Sheppard Murder Case") (May 21, 2000)
- Women Who Kill (October 30, 2005)
  (featuring Kristin Rossum and Margaret Rudin)
- Andrea Yates (November 6, 2005)

=== Directors and producers ===
- Al Adamson
  ("Al Adamson: Murder of a B-Movie King") (March 26, 2000)
- James Cameron (May 21, 2009)
- Bob Fosse (January 3, 1999)
  (February 3, 1999)
- Joe Francis
  ("Joe Francis Gone Wild") (August 1, 2008)
- Alfred Hitchcock (August 8, 1999)
- Russ Meyer (November 7, 1999)
- Julia Phillips
  ("Julia Phillips: Hollywood Outcast") (June 27, 1999)
- Roman Polanski (January 4, 1998)
- Dawn Steel (November 15, 1998)

=== Entertainers and actors ===
- Paula Abdul (September 14, 2003)
- Ben Affleck & Matt Damon (August 3, 2003)
- Kirstie Alley (October 20, 2002)
- Loni Anderson (June 24, 2001)
- Jennifer Aniston (May 22, 2005)
  (December 26, 2008)
- Drew Barrymore (June 13, 2004)
  (November 28, 2007)
- Mischa Barton and Kristin Cavallari
  ("Mischa & Kristin: Babes of the O.C.") (September 10, 2006)
- Kim Basinger (June 29, 2003)
- Justine Bateman (May 25, 2003)
- Halle Berry (April 21, 2007)
- Valerie Bertinelli (November 4, 2009)
- Bill Bixby (August 15, 1999)
- Robert Blake (April 28, 2002)
- Linda Blair (October 24, 1999)
- Sonny Bono (October 10, 1999)
- Lara Flynn Boyle (February 22, 2004)
- Marlon Brando (October 6, 2002)
- The Brat Pack (March 28, 1999)
- Jim J. Bullock (May 7, 2000)
- Gary Busey (February 16, 1998)
- Amanda Bynes (December 16, 2012)
- John Candy (April 3, 2001)
- Karen Carpenter
- Lynda Carter (May 5, 2002)
- Jeanne Carmen
  ("Jeannie Carmen: Queen of the B-Movies") (October 4, 1998)
- David Carradine
  ("Kung Fu: David Carradine Story") (July 30, 2000)
- Kim Cattrall (April 6, 2009)
- Lauren Chapin (April 4, 1999)
- Duane "Dog" Chapman
  ("Dog the Bounty Hunter") (May 24, 2010)
- Chippendales (July 25, 2004)
- Ray Combs (November 16, 1997)
- Simon Cowell (May 14, 2006)
- Courteney Cox (October 21, 2009)
- Bob Crane (January 26, 1998)
- Macaulay Culkin
  ("Macaulay Culkin: A Child's Rise, A Family's Fall") (March 16, 1997)
- Patrick Dempsey (November 10, 2007)
- Johnny Depp (November 23, 2003)
- Bo Derek (October 17, 1999)
- Phyllis Diller (January 28, 2001)
- Kara DioGuardi (October 26, 2011)
- Divine (March 7, 1999)
- Shannen Doherty (July 13, 2003)
- Robert Downey Jr. (1998)
- Peter Duel (November 1, 1999)
- Dominique Dunne
  ("Dominique Dunne: American Tragedy") (February 23, 1997)
- Chris Farley (January 10, 1999)
- Colin Farrell (March 26, 2006)
- Farrah Fawcett (June 20, 1999)
  (August 5, 2009)
- Corey Feldman (January 4, 1998)
- Jane Fonda (November 19, 2000)
- Michael J. Fox (September 4, 2006)
- Bethenny Frankel (September 21, 2011)
- Judy Garland (June 27, 2009)
  ("Last Days of Judy Garland") (January 14, 2001)
- Mel Gibson (August 22, 2004)
- Kate Gosselin (February 2, 2011)
- Melanie Griffith (October 10, 2004)
- Corey Haim (October 17, 2001)
- Daryl Hannah (April 4, 2004)
- Mariska Hargitay (April 18, 2008)
- Rodney Harvey
  ("Poisoned Dreams: Rodney Harvey") (August 23, 1999)
  (November 21, 1999)
- David Hasselhoff (December 16, 2006)
- Joey Heatherton (April 15, 2001)
- Paul Reubens/"Pee-wee Herman" (June 21, 1998)
- Dennis Hopper (April 11, 1999)
- Kate Hudson (September 5, 2008)
- Rock Hudson (July 11, 1999)
- Elizabeth Hurley (June 20, 2004)
- Angelina Jolie (October 16, 2005)
- Anissa Jones
  ("Family Affair: The Anissa Jones Story") (April 18, 1999)
- Christopher Jones (April 19, 1999)
- Margot Kidder (February 15, 1998)
- Nicole Kidman (December 15, 2007)
- Tawny Kitaen (September 29, 2002)
- Sid and Marty Krofft
  ("H.R. Pufnstuf: The Strange World of Sid and Marty Krofft") (December 24, 2000)
- Karyn Kupcinet (September 29, 1999)
- Michael Landon (June 29, 1997)
- Heath Ledger (July 11, 2008)
- Brandon Lee (September 7, 1997)
  (September 17, 1997)
- Emmanuel Lewis (June 22, 2003)
- Jerry Lewis (May 18, 2003)
- Heather Locklear (June 27, 2004)
- Lindsay Lohan (June 12, 2005)
  (February 20, 2012)
- Eva Longoria
  ("Eva Longoria Parker") (May 20, 2009)
- Jennifer Lopez (October 24, 2004)
- Mario Lopez (February 6, 2009)
- Howie Mandel (July 31, 2008)
  (Canada: July 30, 2008)
- Dean Martin (January 24, 1999)
- Kristy McNichol (March 21, 1999)
- Steve McQueen (September 27, 1998)
- Marilyn Monroe
  ("Many Loves of Marilyn Monroe") (March 4, 2001)
- Elizabeth Montgomery
- Demi Moore (June 1, 2003)
- Dudley Moore (March 14, 1999)
- Mary Tyler Moore (May 8, 2005)
- Mr. T (February 7, 1999)
- Jack Nicholson (May 22, 2005)
- Brigitte Nielsen (September 10, 2000)
- Nick Nolte (February 9, 2003)
- Jay North
  ("Dennis the Menace Revealed: Jay North Story") (January 9, 2000)
- Rosie O'Donnell (March 2, 2003)
- Ron O'Neal
  ("Superfly: The Ron O'Neal Story") (February 27, 2000)
- Jennifer O'Neill (1999)
  (2000)
- Ty Pennington (November 17, 2007)
- Anthony Perkins (November 9, 1997)
- Dr. Phil (September 7, 2003)
- Mackenzie Phillips (July 19, 1998)
- River Phoenix (February 16, 1997)
- Dana Plato (November 21, 1999)
- Freddie Prinze (October 18, 1998)
- The Rat Pack (December 5, 2001)
- Rachael Ray (May 5, 2007)
- Keanu Reeves (November 9, 2003)
- Tara Reid (March 21, 2004)
- Burt Reynolds (March 5, 2000)
- Natasha Richardson (July 15, 2009)
- Kelly Ripa (August 6, 2006)
- John Ritter (April 24, 2005)
- Mickey Rourke (August 31, 1999)
- Meg Ryan (October 2, 2005)
- Winona Ryder (April 7, 2002)
- Rebecca Schaeffer
  ("Dark Obsession: The Rebecca Schaeffer Story") (1996)
- Scott Schwartz (October 1, 2000)
- Steven Seagal (October 13, 2002)
- Rod Serling (January 25, 2000)
- William Shatner (December 8, 2002)
- Charlie Sheen (August 11, 2010)
- Cybill Shepherd (October 15, 2006)
- Richard Simmons (2000)
- Christian Slater (May 3, 1998)
- Will Smith (December 8, 2007)
- Snooki (July 27, 2011)
- Suzanne Somers (March 17, 2002)
- Tori Spelling (March 24, 2006)
- James Stacy (April 19, 1999)
- Sylvester Stallone (February 27, 2005)
- John Stamos (September 29, 2007)
- Sharon Stone (January 26, 2004)
- David Strickland (June 4, 2000)
- Patrick Swayze (June 9, 2009)
- Sharon Tate
  ("Last Days of Sharon Tate") (July 25, 1999)
- Elizabeth Taylor (November 29, 1998)
- Charlize Theron (June 20, 2008)
- Uma Thurman (April 18, 2004)
- Jean-Claude Van Damme (May 19, 2002)
- Jim Varney (December 31, 2000)
  ("Ernest Goes to Hollywood") (January 9, 2001)
- Hervé Villechaize (August 15, 1999)
- Jan-Michael Vincent (July 13, 1997)
- Dita Von Teese (May 28, 2009)
- Andy Warhol (March 15, 1998)
- Mark Wahlberg (February 2, 2004)
- Michael Weatherly
  ("Just a Little More Beauty...Michael Weatherly's Life") (April 11, 2012)
  ("NCIS Star Michael Weatherly Gets Silly") (July 30, 2012)
- Adam West
- Who is Kim Kardashian West? (October 13, 2019)
- Reese Witherspoon (November 28, 2008)
- Montel Williams
- Vanessa Williams
- Oprah Winfrey (October 17, 2004)
- Natalie Wood (December 14, 1997)
- Young Hollywood: A to Zac (December 19, 2008)
  (Miley Cyrus, Zac Efron, Jonas Brothers, Taylor Swift)
- Sean Young (June 30, 2002)
- Pia Zadora (May 26, 2002)
- Renée Zellweger

=== Fashion designers ===
- Halston (February 21, 1999)
- Erin Hughes
- Gianni Versace

=== Fashion models ===
- Tyra Banks (November 13, 2005)
- Christie Brinkley
- Naomi Campbell
- Gia Carangi
  ("Gia: Supermodel") (April 22, 2001)
- Janice Dickinson (March 27, 2005)
- Fabio (February 11, 2001)
  (February 14, 2001)
- Jerry Hall
- Margaux Hemingway (January 12, 1997)
- Lauren Hutton (November 25, 2001)
- Heidi Klum (October 24, 2008)
- Kate Moss
- Carré Otis (January 6, 2002)
- Brooke Shields (September 11, 2005)
- Kimora Lee Simmons (October 3, 2008)
- Supermodels: Beyond Skin Deep
- Niki Taylor (June 16, 2002)

=== Game shows ===
- Family Feud (July 28, 2002)
- The Gong Show (January 5, 2003)
- Hollywood Squares (March 30, 2003)
- The Price Is Right (January 27, 2002)
- Wheel of Fortune (January 23, 2005)

=== Movies ===
- American Pie
  ("American Pie Uncovered")
- Billy Jack (March 12, 2000)
- Clueless (December 19, 2001)
- The Cotton Club
  ("Cotton Club Movie") (May 25, 1997)
- Diner (May 12, 2002)
- Dirty Dancing (September 3, 2000)
- The Exorcist
  ("Curse of the Exorcist") (August 15, 2004)
- Fast Times at Ridgemont High (January 13, 2002)
- Flashdance (April 2, 2000)
- Jaws (June 9, 2002)
- Mean Girls (March 16, 2007)
- Our Gang/The Little Rascals
  ("Curse of The Little Rascals") (November 24, 2000)
- Poltergeist
  ("Curse of the Poltergeist") (October 19, 2002)
  (featuring Heather O'Rourke and Dominique Dunne)
- Scarface (October 7, 2006)
- Scream (October 31, 2001)
- Sixteen Candles (June 10, 2001)
- The Terminator (April 14, 2002)
- The Texas Chainsaw Massacre (October 1, 2006)
- Tropic Thunder
- Twilight Zone: The Movie
  ("The Twilight Zone Trial") (January 23, 2000)

=== Musicians ===
- Aaliyah (October 21, 2001)
- Paula Abdul (August 28, 2005)
- Christina Aguilera (September 14, 2005)
- Clay Aiken (December 12, 2008)
- The Beach Boys (July 7, 2002)
- Brandy
- Mariah Carey (November 28, 2001)
- Karen Carpenter (April 13, 1997)
- Johnny Cash (June 28, 1998)
- Cher (September 28, 2003)
- Sean Combs
- Sheryl Crow (January 23, 2009)
- Sammy Davis Jr. (July 29, 2001)
- Doris Day (February 3, 2003)
- Celine Dion (Canada: August 6, 2008)
- Country Divas (Shania Twain, Shelby Lynne, Faith Hill, Dixie Chicks, Trisha Yearwood & Gretchen Wilson)
- John Denver (May 10, 1998)
- Mama Cass Elliot (February 19, 2001)
- Missy Elliott
- Eminem (July 6, 2003)
- Nelly Furtado (August 13, 2008)
- Judy Garland
- Marvin Gaye (January 28, 1998)
- CeeLo Green (September 16, 2013)
- Michael Hutchence (December 5, 1999)
- Janet Jackson
- La Toya Jackson (February 27, 2000)
- Michael Jackson (June 8, 2003)
  ("2005 Trial") (December 23, 2008)
- Janis Joplin
- Adam Lambert (November 21, 2010)
- Justin Bieber
- Tommy Lee (August 23, 1998)
- John Lennon
  ("John Lennon: Final Days") (October 11, 1998)
- Liberace (July 26, 1998)
- Little Richard (July 16, 2000)
- LL Cool J (April 15, 2009)
- Jennifer Lopez
- Courtney Love (October 5, 2003)
- Dean Martin
- George Michael (February 26, 2002)
- Bret Michaels (March 6, 2009)
- Nicki Minaj (April 22, 2012)
- Liza Minnelli (July 21, 2002)
- The Monkees (August 1, 1999)
- New Kids on the Block (June 17, 2001)
- *NSYNC
- Wayne Newton (December 3, 2000)
- Olivia Newton-John
- Dolly Parton (May 10, 2005)
- Katy Perry
- Pink (July 23, 2006)
- Elvis Presley
  ("Elvis: Hollywood Years") (March 29, 1998)
  ("Last Days of Elvis") (September 19, 1999)
- Lisa Marie Presley (March 9, 2003)
- The Pussycat Dolls (May 23, 2008)
- Diana Ross (February 16, 2003)
- Selena (December 7, 1996) (A recreation of her 1995 murder trial)
- Frank Sinatra (May 14, 1998)
  ("Sinatra in Hollywood") (May 17, 1998)
- Snoop Dogg (July 31, 2005)
- Britney Spears
  ("Britney Spears: The Price of Fame") (July 25, 2008)
  ("Britney Spears: Fall from Grace")
- Nicole Scherzinger
- Spice Girls (October 14, 2001)
- Taylor Swift (April 7, 2010)
- Tiffany (July 14, 2002)
- Timbaland (December 20, 2011)
- Tiny Tim (December 31, 2000)
  (March 25, 2001)
- Tanya Tucker (April 13, 2003)
- Usher (January 27, 2010)
- Village People (January 2, 2000)
- Amy Winehouse (February 9, 2008)

=== News anchors, reporters and journalists ===
- James Bacon
- Rona Barrett
- Katie Couric (January 4, 2004)
- Star Jones (October 31, 2008)
- Jane Pauley (November 7, 2004)
- Giuliana Rancic (April 1, 2012)
- Geraldo Rivera (November 21, 2004)

=== Playboy personalities ===
- Pamela Anderson (November 6, 2008)
- Rebekka Armstrong
- The Barbi Twins (May 27, 2001)
- Carmen Electra (February 4, 2001)
- Jessica Hahn (November 8, 1998)
- Hugh Hefner
- Claudia Jennings
- Holly Madison (March 30, 2011)
- Jenny McCarthy (May 9, 2004)
- Bettie Page
  ("Bettie Page: From Pinup to Sex Queen") (March 27, 1997)
  (April 27, 1997)
- Anna Nicole Smith (May 11, 1997)
- Dorothy Stratten (January 16, 2000)
- Shannon Tweed (April 30, 2009)
- Kendra Wilkinson
  ("Kendra") (March 17, 2010)

=== Royalty and billionaires ===
- Princess Diana (August 30, 1998)
  (also "Diana: Legacy of a Princess") (August 31, 2003)
- Rebecca Ferratti and Sultan of Brunei
  ("Sultan and Centerfold") (December 6, 1998)
- First Daughters (April 14, 2007)
  (Daughters of United States presidents)
- Grace Kelly, Princess Caroline, and Princess Stéphanie
  ("Grace, Caroline, Stephanie: Curse of the Royal Family")
  (April 7, 1998)
- Sarah: Duchess of York (December 21, 2010)
- Society Girls (Daughters of high society's wealthiest figures)
- Donald Trump (April 9, 2000)
- Trust Fund Babies (May 31, 2004)
  (Daughters of rich and famous parents, such as Paris Hilton)
- Young Royals (Seven European royals)

=== Television / reality shows ===
- 24 (January 13, 2007)
- All in the Family (August 27, 2000)
- American Idol
- American Idol: Girls Rule (December 11, 2005)
  (Kelly Clarkson, Carrie Underwood, and Fantasia Barrino)
- America's Next Top Model
- The Andy Griffith Show
  ("Andy of Mayberry") (February 6, 2000)
- The Apprentice
- The Bachelor
- Bad Girls of Reality TV (Omarosa, Trishelle Cannatella and Alison Irwin)
- Batman
- Baywatch (May 16, 1999) (also July 1, 2001)
- Beverly Hills, 90210 (July 22, 2001)
- The Beverly Hillbillies (January 7, 2001)
- Bewitched (August 22, 1999)
- Big Brother
- Blossom (August 21, 2005)
- The Brady Bunch (June 6, 1999)
- Charles in Charge (May 21, 2006)
- Cheers (November 26, 2000)
- CHiPs (December 26, 1999)
- Clueless
- The Cosby Show
  ("The Cosby Kids") (August 12, 2001)
- Dallas (August 13, 2000)
- Dancing with the Stars (May 12, 2007)
- Dawson's Creek
  ("The Kids of Dawson's Creek") (December 4, 2005)
- Desperate Housewives
  ("Women of Desperate Housewives") (September 25, 2005)
- Diff'rent Strokes (September 20, 1998)
- Duck Dynasty (July 10, 2014)
- The Dukes of Hazzard (January 21, 2001)
- Dynasty (November 11, 2001)
- Dog the Bounty Hunter
- Eight Is Enough (August 6, 2000)
- The Facts of Life
  ("Facts of Life Girls") (November 28, 1999)
- Friends (November 19, 2006)
- Full House (March 13, 2005)
- Gimme a Break! (April 27, 2003)
- Gilligan's Island (December 12, 1999)
- Good Times (August 20, 2000)
- Growing Pains (August 19, 2001)
- Home Improvement (December 18, 2005)
- I Dream of Jeannie (November 27, 2000)
- I Love Lucy (May 1, 2005)
- The Jenny Jones Show (February 25, 2001)
- L.A. Law (October 28, 2001)
- The Little Rascals
  ("Curse of the Little Rascals") (November 24, 2002)
- Magnum, P.I. (August 5, 2001)
- Married... with Children (August 26, 2001)
- Melrose Place (June 15, 2003)
- Miami Vice (June 3, 2001)
- Modern Family
- The Mickey Mouse Club (June 9, 2007)
  (All three versions, 1955–58, 1977–79, and 1989–96)
- The Mod Squad (February 13, 2000)
- The Monkees
- The Partridge Family (September 13, 1999)
- Punky Brewster (August 20, 2006)
  (also its star Soleil Moon Frye)
- The Real World (August 24, 2003)
- Reality Ex-wives (Adrianne Curry, LuAnn de Lesseps, Linda Bollea, Courtney Stodden, and Jennifer Williams)
- Roseanne (April 23, 2000)
- Saved by the Bell (December 1, 2002)
- Seinfeld (December 23, 2006)
- Sex and the City
  ("Women of Sex and the City") (April 16, 2006)
- The Sopranos (April 20, 2003)
- Survivor (May 2, 2001)
- Three's Company (December 27, 1998)
- That '70s Show (May 7, 2006)
- The View
- Who's the Boss? (December 24, 2005)
- Welcome Back Kotter (October 8, 2000)
- The Young and the Restless (May 20, 2001)

=== THS Investigates ===
- Bridal to Homicidal
- Chandra Levy and the Capitol Murders (February 26, 2006)
- Cheerleading
- Cults, Religion and Mind Control (September 26, 2008)
- Curse of the Lottery (September 24, 2006)
- Curse of the Lottery 2 (September 8, 2010)
- Dating Nightmares (June 13, 2012)
- Deadly Waters (June 18, 2006)
- Diet Fads (March 21, 2008)
- Does Hip-Hop Reject Women? (October 20, 2019)
- Hazing (December 1, 2007)
- Horror Movies: Cursed or Coincidence? (October 27, 2019)
- Hot for Student (September 1, 2007)
- Husbands Who Kill (November 14, 2008)
- Inside the Mind of a Serial Killer (July 17, 2005)
- Is Fame an Addiction? (November 3, 2019)
- Kidnapping (October 6, 2007)
- Love Behind Bars (April 17, 2005)
- Murder and the Media Machine (October 3, 2004)
- NXIVM: Self Help or Sex Cult? (October 6, 2019)
- Online Nightmares (December 2, 2006)
- Original Night Stalker (May 6, 2009)
- Paparazzi (February 10, 2007)
- Plastic Surgery Nightmares (November 28, 2005)
- Prom Nightmares (May 2, 2008)
- The Real-Life CSI (July 24, 2005)
- Rich Kids Who Kill (May 12, 2010)
- Serial Killers on the Loose (September 12, 2008)
- Social Media Nightmares (February 25, 2015)
- Spring Break Nightmares
- Starving for Perfection (October 8, 2006)
- Teen Pregnancy Nightmares (April 29, 2009)
- Teenage Trafficking
- Vegas Winners & Losers (June 13, 2008)
- What's Killing Music's Biggest Stars? (November 17, 2019)
- Young Stars in Trouble with the Law (September 29, 2014)

=== United States presidents ===
- Bill Clinton
  ("Bill Clinton: All the President's Women") (December 14, 2003)
- John F. Kennedy
- Donald Trump

=== Venues ===
- The Comedy Store
- Studio 54
  ("Studio 54: Sex, Drugs & Disco") (May 24, 1998)

=== Other ===
- Criss Angel (June 24, 2009)
- Baseball Wives (July 8, 2009)
- Basketball Wives (February 10, 2010)
- The Beatle Wives (February 14, 1999)
- Beauty Pageants
- Biggest Scandals Ever
- The Bond Girls (November 17, 2002)
- Mary Jo Buttafuoco, Joey Buttafuoco and Amy Fisher
  ("Long Island Scandal: The Buttafuocos & Amy Fisher")
  (September 14, 1999)
  (November 14, 1999)
- Canadian Hollywood Heartthrobs (March 30, 2009)
- Country Divas (November 20, 2005)
- Paula Deen (October 14, 2013)
- John DeLorean (May 9, 1999)
- Pamela Des Barres (January 31, 1999)
- Does Hip-Hop Reject Women? (October 20, 2019)
- Larry Flynt (December 10, 2000)
- Football Wives
- Amber Frey (June 26, 2005)
- Wally George (July 23, 2000)
- Elizabeth Glaser (November 22, 1998)
- Patty Hearst (November 12, 2000)
- Hip Hop Wives
- Hollywood Ex-Wives (October 7, 2009)
- Hollywood Heartthrobs (March 30, 2009)
- Jacqueline Kennedy Onassis
  ("Last Days of Jackie O") (October 29, 2000)
- John F. Kennedy, Jr. (December 13, 2010)
  ("The Last Days of John F. Kennedy, Jr.") (July 15, 2001)
- Evel Knievel (December 20, 1998)
- Lobster Boy (October 22, 2000)
- Heather Mills
- Charlie Minor
  ("The Murder of Music Mogul Charlie Minor") (March 1, 1998)
- Murder in Las Vegas (November 10, 2002)
- Sarah Palin (April 21, 2011)
- Laci Peterson (May 2, 2004)
- JonBenét Ramsey (October 26, 2003)
- Rapper Wives (May 13, 2009)
- Reality Ex-Wives (May 22, 2014)
- Reality Splits (December 4, 2014)
- Rock Daughters (September 30, 2009)
- Rock Star Kids (January 29, 2005)
- Rock Star Wives
- Rock Wives Part 2
- Laura Schlessinger
- Scream Queens (October 31, 2004)
- Siegfried & Roy (April 30, 2000)
- Richard Simmons (June 25, 2000)
- Linda Sobek (November 1, 1998)
- Martha Stewart (May 13, 2001)
- The Sunset Strip (May 2, 1999)
- Jacqueline Susann (June 7, 1998)
- Teen Idols of the '80s (June 20, 2005)
- Jesse Ventura (July 2, 2000)
- Heidi von Beltz (May 23, 1999)
- John Walsh
  ("America's Crime Fighter: John Walsh") (October 15, 2000)
- Jill Ann Weatherwax
  ("The Murder of Miss Hollywood") (October 31, 1999)

== Accolades ==
The series won a Gracie Award in 1998 for the episode on Gilda Radner and was nominated for Emmy Awards in 2001, 2002, and 2003, and Prism Awards in 2009.

== See also ==
- The Insider
