= About Us (song) =

Single by Brooke Hogan featuring Paul Wall

from the album Undiscovered
- Released: June 13, 2006
- Genre: Dance-pop; hip-hop; R&B
- Length: 3:27 (Album Version); 3:18 (Remix Version)
- Label: Storch Music Company, SoBe Entertainment
- Songwriters: Paul Slayton, Scott Storch, Jason Boyd
- Producers: Scott Storch (2006 version), Rodney Jerkins (2007 version)

Brooke Hogan singles chronology
"Everything to Me" (2004)	"About Us" (2006)	"Falling" (2009)

Paul Wall singles chronology
"Holla at Me" (2006)	"About Us" (2006)	"Way I Be Leanin'" (2006)

"About Us" is a dance-pop song by Brooke Hogan, featuring Paul Wall. It was released as the first single from Hogan's debut album Undiscovered in June 2006 in the US and remained the only successful single in her career. The music video premiered on June 25, 2006, after the season two finale of Hogan Knows Best, in which Hogan prepares and then films the video for the song. The song is the first single released by Scott Storch's record label, Storch Music Company; Hogan was the first act to sign with this label.

DJ E-Rock collaborated a Bay Area hyphy remix of the single, featuring lyrics from E-40 and beats from Traxamillion.

== Track listing ==
US Promo CD

1. About Us [Pop Mix] 3:29
2. About Us [Tony Moran & Warren Rigg Up In My Bizness Radio Mix] 3:58
3. About Us [Crossover Mix] 3:24
4. About Us [Call Out Hook] 0:07

Remixes

1. About Us [Up In My Bizness Club Mix] 9:11
2. About Us [TM / WR / JdB Infusion Dub] 9:33

Moran & Rigg Remixes Promo CD

1. About Us [Up In My Bizness Edit] 3:41
2. About Us [Up In My Bizness Club Mix] 9:12
3. About Us [Up In My Bizness Mixshow Edit] 6:57
4. About Us [TM / WR / JdB Infusion Dub] 9:35
5. About Us [Accapella) 9:19

== Music video ==
The budget for the video was $300,000 and was shot in California. In the video, Brooke does a work-out/dance routine in a gym with a jump rope. Later, she goes to a club and dances along with her backup dancers. The video ends in the club with a dance competition between Brooke's "crew" and a rival crew. In some scenes she is seen wearing rhinestone-encrusted sunglasses, a pair of grills given to her by Paul Wall for her 18th birthday. She also is depicted in a nightclub and has a dance-off with other girls.

The video premiered on Hogan Knows Best on June 25, 2006. The music video also premiered on Total Request Live on July 24, 2006, as a PRE-RL. Later on, WWE Raw premiered the video.

A snippet of this video was seen on The Soup weeks later, infamously mocking the lyrics "I'm just trying to live, but you're all up in my grill...".

== Chart performance ==
"About Us" debuted on the Billboard Hot 100 for the week ending August 19, 2006. The song was the Hot Shot Debut of the week, landing at number 53. In its second week, the song went to its peak of number 33. It is the highest-peaking song of Brooke Hogan, and the second highest-peaking song of Paul Wall. On the Rhythmic Top 40 chart, it peaked at number 21.

=== Weekly charts ===
Chart (2006)	Peak position
Canada CHR/Top 40 (Billboard)	34
US Billboard Hot 100	33
US Dance Club Songs (Billboard)	29
US Dance Airplay (Billboard)	9
US Pop Airplay (Billboard)	23

== Release history ==
Release dates and formats for "About Us"
Region	Date	Format	Label(s)	Ref.
United States	August 8, 2006	Mainstream airplay	SoBe	
