= World Cry =

Studio album by Jah Cure
- Released: May 14, 2013 (U.S.)
- Genre: Reggae
- Label: SoBe Entertainment
- Producer: Siccature Alcock, James Beard, Jason Boyd, Shaun Chablal, Raymond Diaz, S. Flaherty, Jussi Jaakola, Adam Lukas, Wayne Morris, Justin Nation, Mark Thompson, Wayne Thompson, David Bowes

Jah Cure chronology
The Universal Cure (2009)	World Cry (2013)	The Cure (2015)

World Cry is a reggae album by Jah Cure. It was released on May 14, 2013. The album has guest appearances from artists such as Jazmine Sullivan and Mavado, crossing the Reggae, Hip-hop, Latin, Pop and R&B genres.

== Reception ==
The album peaked at No. 7 on the Billboard Reggae Albums Chart.

== Track listing ==
1. "Nothing Is Impossible"
2. "Can't Wait"
3. "Co-Sign"
4. "Before I Leave"
5. "Unconditional Love"
6. "Only Vice"
7. "Choose Up" (featuring Jazmine Sullivan)
8. "Me Miss"
9. "Like I See It" (featuring Mavado)
10. "World Cry"
11. "Reach Out"
12. "Save Yourself"
13. "Praises to Jah" (featuring Phyllisia)
14. "All by Myself"

== Charts ==
Chart (2013)	Peak position
US Reggae Albums (Billboard)	7
