= True Reflections...A New Beginning =

Studio album by Jah Cure
- Released: July 31, 2007
- Genre: Reggae, Roots
- Length: 58:53
- Label: VP Records

Jah Cure chronology
Freedom Blues (2005)	True Reflections...A New Beginning (2007)	Universal Cure (2009)

True Reflections...A New Beginning is the fourth album from Jamaican reggae musician Jah Cure. It was released in 2007 and is his first album since being released from prison on 27 July 2007. It features contributions from Fantan Mojah and Gentleman.

== Track listing ==
1. True Reflections - 4:08
2. Dem Na Build Great Man feat. Fantan Mojah - 3:59
3. Longing For - 3:52
4. To Your Arms Of Love - 3:48
5. What Will It Take You - 3:44
6. Love You - 4:27
7. Same Way - 3:55
8. Searching For A Girl - 3:30
9. Jamaica - 3:39
10. Cease All War - 3:27
11. Share the Love feat. Gentleman - 4:21
12. Love Is - 3:38
13. The Sound - 3:23
14. Conga Man - 3:49
15. Most High Cup Full - 5:13
