= Glenn Douglas Packard =

Multimedia artist

- Born: January 21, 1969 (age 57); Clare, Michigan
- Known for: Dance and choreography
- Notable work: Michael Jackson: 30th Anniversary Special; Brooke Knows Best; Pitchfork (film)

Glenn Douglas Packard (born January 21, 1969) is a choreographer, dancer, reality television star, recording artist and film director born in Clare, Michigan, United States. He starred on two seasons of the VH1 reality series Brooke Knows Best. Packard made his directorial debut with the slasher film Pitchfork, which was released in January 2017.

As a choreographer, Packard earned a Primetime Emmy Award nomination for his work on the Michael Jackson: 30th Anniversary Special. His choreography has also appeared in the televised "Lance Loves Michael Wedding Special" for former N'Sync member Lance Bass, various music videos and the Bollywood film "Rhythm." Packard also established a professional dance company, The INstitute of Dancers, in 2017. It is located in Lansing, Michigan.

== Early life ==
Born in Detroit, Packard is the eldest of three to parents Roger and Paulette Packard. He spent his early life on a dairy farm in Clare, MI, and went on to study Dairy Management at Michigan State University. After an ATV accident resulted in a compound fracture in his right tibia and fibula, doctors suggested amputating his leg from the knee down. After taking months to heal, and learn to walk again, Packard decided to pursue his dreams of dancing instead of entering the family business.

== Career ==
As a choreographer, Packard has worked with some of biggest names in pop music, from Pink and Usher to Whitney Houston and Liza Minnelli. Perhaps his most recognized work is the Emmy-nominated artistic direction for "The King of Pop" Michael Jackson. Shortly after his 2002 Emmy nomination, Packard was scouted by pop music entrepreneur Lou Pearlman, manager of Backstreet Boys, N'Sync and many other successful boy bands. He joined the group twONEty (21), which toured Europe extensively before disbanding.

While working with Pearlman, Packard met then 13-year-old aspiring singer Brooke Hogan, daughter of professional wrestling legend Hulk Hogan. In addition to costarring with the younger Hogan for two years on the VH1 reality series Brooke Knows Best, he also choreographed her 2004 music video "Everything to Me."

Packard parlayed experience reinventing the Chippendales male revue for its 25th anniversary into a costarring role as choreographer for the E! Network television event Men of the Strip, which focused on the discovery and cultivation of the next great Las Vegas male revue.

Currently, Packard owns and mentors the professional dance company, The INstitute of Dancers. It was established in early 2017, and is located in East Lansing, Michigan.
