= Undiscovered (Brooke Hogan album) =

Studio album by Brooke Hogan
- Released: October 24, 2006
- Recorded: 2003–2006
- Genres: Dance-pop; hip hop; R&B
- Length: 51:09
- Labels: Storch, SoBe
- Producers: Scott Storch; KayGee

Brooke Hogan chronology
Undiscovered (2006)	The Redemption (2009)

Singles from Undiscovered
- 1. "About Us" Released: June 13, 2006; 2. "Heaven Baby" Released: January 2, 2007

Professional ratings
Review scores
Source	Rating
Allmusic	2/5 stars
Commonsense Media	3/5 stars

Undiscovered is the debut album from American singer Brooke Hogan, released on October 24, 2006, by Storch Music Company and SoBe Entertainment.

The album sold 30,000 copies in its first week, debuting at number 28 on the US Billboard 200. By April 2007, it sold another 97,000.

== Background ==
Brooke Hogan first signed a record deal with Trans Continental Records in 2002. She began work on her debut album in mid-2003 and had an album recorded and ready to be released in September 2004. After her first single, "Everything to Me", bombed the charts, the release of her debut album This Voice was canceled and she was dropped from the label. Two years later, Hogan signed to Storch Music Company, as well as SoBe Entertainment to release her debut album, which she had been recording for three years.

== Recording ==
Hogan recorded the album in Miami, Florida with producer Scott Storch. The song "Beautiful Transformation" was originally to feature a rap by Stacks, but they changed it at the last minute to feature the original lyrics written for the song and sung by Hogan. Brooke stated in August 2007 that she was very unhappy with the record, and she also felt it did not reflect her as an artist like her second album.

== Singles ==
The lead single from the album "About Us" premiered on the season two finale of Hogan Knows Best. It was officially released on June 13, 2006. The song debuted on the Billboard Hot 100 at No. 33 for the week ending August 19, 2006. The music video premiered on Hogan Knows Best on June 25, 2006. The music video also appeared on Total Request Live on July 24, 2006 as a PRE-RL.

"Heaven Baby" was released as the album's second single on January 2, 2007, and received minimal pop airplay throughout the month of January 2007. A video was going to be filmed in February 2007, but after the song had no success, the plans of making it the second single were cancelled, as was the video.

"For a Moment" was released as a promotional single on March 6, 2007. Later that month, Brooke released a music video for the song, which featured clips of seasons three and four of Hogan Knows Best.

== Track listing ==
No.	Title	Writer(s)	Producer(s)	Length
1.	"About Us" (featuring Paul Wall)	Jason Boyd; Paul Slayton; Scott Storch	Storch	3:23
2.	"Heaven Baby" (featuring Beenie Man)	Nelly Furtado; Moses Davis; Storch	Storch	4:15
3.	"Next Time"	Makeba Riddick; Robert Waller; Kam Houff; Storch	Storch	3:19
4.	"For a Moment"	Anthony Asher; Storch	Storch	3:48
5.	"My Space"	Boyd; Storch	Storch	3:24
6.	"All About Me"	Boyd; Storch	Storch	3:51
7.	"My Number" (featuring Stack$)	Boyd; Yannique Barker; Storch	Storch	3:40
8.	"Beautiful Transformation"	Brooke Bollea; Steve Morales; Balewa Muhammed	Morales	4:12
9.	"One Sided Love"	Boyd; Storch	Storch	3:34
10.	"Letting Go"	Houff; Storch	Storch	4:21
11.	"Dance Alone" (featuring Nox)	Boyd; Rene Pichardo; Storch	Storch	3:24
12.	"Love You, Hate You"	Tawanna Dabney; Joel Kipnis; Dan Wilenski; Bert Keyes; Sylvia Robinson	Kaygee; JK; Dan Strong	3:39
13.	"Incognito"	Keir Gist; Kipnis; Wilenski; Terence Abney; Addaryll Wilson; Brian Coleman; Dabney; Claude Kelly	Kaygee; JK; Dan Strong; Terence "Tramp" Abney; BK	3:04
14.	"Low Rider Jeans"	Bollea; Damon Elliott	Elliott	3:23

Digital edition bonus track
No.	Title	Length
9.	"Certified"	2:36

Walmart edition bonus track
No.	Title	Length
9.	"Crazy Love"	3:06

Japanese edition bonus tracks
No.	Title	Length
9.	"Certified"	2:35
16.	"Crazy Love"	3:06

Note: "Love You, Hate You" samples the 1970 The Moments song "Love on a Two-Way Street"

== Charts ==
Chart performance for Undiscovered
Chart (2007)	Peak position
US Billboard 200	28
US Independent Albums (Billboard)	1

== Release history ==
Country	Date	Format	Label
United States	October 24, 2006	CD, digital download	SMC, SoBe Entertainment
Canada	November 7, 2006	CD	SMC, SoBe Entertainment
Canada	January 9, 2007	Digital download	SMC, SoBe Entertainment
