= The Redemption (album) =

Studio album by Brooke Hogan
- Released: July 21, 2009
- Length: 47:35
- Label: SoBe; Fontana
- Producer: Keith Pittman; Derek Allen; Trevor James; Ken Gioia; Shep Goodman; Raymond Diaz; Jared Hancock; Oak; Aaron Accetta

Brooke Hogan chronology
Undiscovered (2006)	The Redemption (2009)	I Wanna Be Your Girlfriend (2015)

Singles from The Redemption
- 1. "Falling" Released: March 31, 2009; 2. "Hey Yo!" Released: June 30, 2009

The Redemption is the second studio album by American singer Brooke Hogan. The album was released on July 21, 2009, under SoBe Entertainment and Fontana Records. Brooke collaborated with several artists for the album, including Stack$, Colby O'Donis, and Flo Rida.

== Singles ==
"Falling" was released as the first official single from the album on March 31, 2009. "Hey Yo!" was released as the second official single from the album on June 30, 2009.

== Critical reception ==
Professional ratings
Review scores
Source	Rating
AllMusic	2.5/5 stars
US Weekly	3/4 stars
Associated Press	(unfavorable)

Reviews for the album have been fairly mixed, but more positive than reviews for her debut album Undiscovered.

Us Weekly gave the album a positive 3 out of 4 stars review, stating: "Brooke Hogan knows best . . . not to put out a CD like her weak 2006 debut. Luckily, the VH1 reality star, 21, has whipped up a much-improved set of pop love songs for her second effort."

AllMusic gave the album a mixed 2 and 1/2 stars, stating: "In a sense, there's a crass purity to the bad taste of Redemption, as it's nothing more than the product of a pretty, curvy girl who just wants to sing, and producers who create tracks to fit those curves, and if it's not a lot of fun to hear Hogan and team race toward the same goal on parallel tracks, at least it produces a whole lot of bewildered fascination."

Ron Harris of the Associated Press wrote: "Brooke Hogan may know best on her reality show, but she should have known better than churning out the lackluster album The Redemption. It's all tricks, and few treats. On most songs it's hard to tell where the vocoder and production tricks end and Hogan's own voice begins. This is bad, since Hogan has a perfectly fine pop music voice. But she lets the folks behind the mixing board overpower her to a fault."

== Commercial reception ==
The Redemption debuted at number 144 on the Billboard 200.

== Track listing ==
No.	Title	Writer(s)	Producer(s)	Length
1.	"Intro"	Keith Pittman, Yannique Barker	Keith Pittman	1:01
2.	"Strip"	Brooke Bollea; Derek Allen	Derek Allen	3:16
3.	"Hey Yo!" (featuring Colby O'Donis)	Pittman; Colby O'Donis; Charles Harris, Jr.; Bollea; Barker	Keith Pittman	3:38
4.	"Trust Me" (featuring Urban Mystic)	Bollea; Trevor James	Trevor James	3:45
5.	"Falling" (featuring Stacks)	Bollea; Allen	Derek Allen	3:04
6.	"All I Want Is You"	Ken Gioia; Michael Goodman	Ken Gioia; Shep Goodman	3:26
7.	"Dear Mom..."	Bollea; Raymond Diaz	Raymond Diaz	4:35
8.	"Handcuffed"	Bollea; Jared Hancock	Jared Hancock	3:37
9.	"Ruff Me Up" (featuring Flo Rida)	Bollea; Diaz; Tramar Dillard	Raymond Diaz	3:13
10.	"BeDDable"	Bollea; Warren Felder	Oak	3:57
11.	"You'll Never Be Like Him"	Aaron Accetta; Gioia; Goodman; Amanda Ventrice	Aaron Accetta	3:09
12.	"The One That Got Away" (featuring Stack$)	Bollea; Barker; Hancock	Jared Hancock	3:33
13.	"Redemption"	Bollea; Pittman	Keith Pittman	3:54
14.	"Finish Line"	Bollea; Pittman	Keith Pittman	3:33

== Charts ==
Chart performance for The Redemption
Chart (2009)	Peak position
US Billboard 200	144
US Independent Albums (Billboard)	27
