= Brooke Knows Best =

American reality television show

- Genre: Reality
- Directed by: John Ehrhard
- Starring: Brooke Hogan; Glenn Douglas Packard; Ashley Menendez
- Opening theme: "It's My Life" by Brooke Hogan
- Country of origin: United States
- No. of seasons: 2
- No. of episodes: 20

Production
- Executive producers: Brad Abramson; Kimberly Belcher Cowin; Jeff Olde; Shelly Tatro
- Production locations: Miami, Florida
- Running time: 30 mins.
- Production company: Pink Sneakers Productions

Original release
- Network: VH1
- Release: July 13, 2008 – August 9, 2009

Related
- Hogan Knows Best

Brooke Knows Best is a VH1 reality series spin-off from the hit VH1 reality program, Hogan Knows Best. The series first aired July 13, 2008. Shot in South Beach, Miami, the show follows Brooke Hogan entering adulthood independent from her parents, no longer living under their roof or being supported by them.

== Overview ==
Brooke Knows Best focuses on singer and daughter of legendary professional wrestler Hulk Hogan, Brooke Hogan, and her friendships with her two roommates, Glenn and Ashley. The series features Hogan dealing with her family's problems, her music career, and her life as she's no longer dependent upon her parents nor lives with her family. The show consists of her friends, Glenn and Ashley – who are often encouraging Brooke to get out, have fun, and party. Brooke, Glenn, and Ashley live in a penthouse in South Beach. Two major problems Brooke deals with in the show's first season are dating and coping through the trials and tribulations of her family which is why the series came about as a spin-off of Hogan Knows Best. Her family is no longer together due to Hulk and Linda Hogan's divorce, as well as Nick Hogan's prior arrest related to a serious car crash in which he permanently injured his best friend; for these reasons, the predecessor show was cancelled. As of the first season of Brooke Knows Best, Hulk Hogan has made many guest appearances, usually to the frustrations of Brooke and her two roommates; Linda has made a couple (one in which she's seen heartbroken and crying over the circumstances surrounding her family); Nick has made one.

== Cast ==
- Brooke Hogan, now out on her own with the love and support of her family, Brooke often finds herself unsure of how to handle many situations. As one example, she's become confused with what she wants to do in life, reconsidering going to college as opposed to continuing on with her career in music. Because of her passiveness, admittedly hating confrontation, Hogan has had numerous issues being direct and up-front with people, especially considering the fact that her father took over in this area when they lived together. Brooke is not without her goofy and playful side that was seen on Hogan Knows Best. Occasionally, Hogan also finds herself depressed and saddened from reflecting on her family's troubles, as well as in terms of romantic relationships. Despite no longer having her father as an obstacle in meeting boys, Hogan has found that an even bigger obstacle is finding the right one.
- Glenn Douglas Packard is Brooke's affable, jovial, fun-loving roommate. Glenn is a music director and choreographer from Clare, Michigan, who handles the choreography for Brooke's music. Glenn is openly gay and Hulk Hogan was quick to make sure of this upon finding out that he would be rooming with Brooke, making it clear that he wasn't ok with any heterosexual or bisexual men living with his daughter. With her parents now out of the picture, Glenn acts as a support system for Brooke, especially when she is feeling sad about something or confused on how to handle certain situations. Very supportive and open-minded, Glenn helps Brooke in making decisions, offers advice, and is always open to whatever decisions Brooke ends up making.
- Ashley Menendez is Brooke's second roommate to move in. When Brooke and Glenn were unable to find a fitting second roommate in their area, they both decided on Ashley, who was an old high school friend of Brooke's. Prior to the series, Menendez had moved to New York to become a dancer but had to stop due to an injury.

== Episodes ==
=== Season 1 (2008) ===
Season 1 began on July 13, 2008, and ended on October 5, 2008.

1. "Movin' In" – With her 20th birthday approaching, Brooke Hogan prepares to leave the family home and move into her own apartment in Miami Beach. Despite the divorce, both of her parents are there to aid in her move but Brooke fears that her overprotective father may not be as ready to let her go as she is to leave the nest.
2. "Best Roommate Ever" – Brooke's mom, Linda, comes to visit her home for the first time. Brooke and Glenn decide to interview potential roommates to help with the rent.
3. "House Party" – Brooke throws a big house party and invites a guy she likes. She becomes jealous when her ex shows up and hits on her new roommate, Ashley.
4. "Spring Break Smackdown" – Brooke is asked to be a celebrity guest for Panama City Beach, Florida's spring break festivities. Friends and family collide when her dad and Knobs invite themselves along.
5. "Brooke's Extreme Boyfriend" – Brooke dates a guy who is an extreme sports fan; she accompanies him for wakeboarding and paintball. She soon finds out that one of his hobbies isn't for her.
6. "The Guest From Hell" – Glenn's friend Ray comes to stay at the condo for a few weeks, but it only takes a few days for him to get on Brooke and Ashley's nerves.
7. "Brooke's First Prom" – Brooke begins promoting an organization that provides prom dresses to girls who cannot afford one. To raise money for the cause, she auctions off a date with herself and is bought by a nerdy high school boy who wants to impress his friends.
8. "Tattoo Me" – Brooke decides that she needs to mark her independence, so she gets a tattoo with Linda's approval but is worried over how Hulk will react and has to face the music when Hulk invites her and her roommates to visit him on the set of American Gladiators.
9. "Strip To Be Fit" – Brooke tries to convince Linda to get in shape by going to try a "pole exercise" class with her and Ashley. Brooke likes the class so much that she decides to buy a pole of her own so that she can work out in the apartment. But when some of her friends post a video of her doing the moves on the Internet, she has to deal with the embarrassment and the fury of Hulk.
10. "The Old College Try" – With no label, manager, or contract, Brooke finds her music career nearly dead in the water. With her options limited, Brooke starts to look into something many girls her age do, college. With her friends supporting her to return to school but her dreams of fame distracting her, Brooke must decide what direction her life is going to take.

=== Season 2 (2009) ===
Season 2 began on June 7, 2009, and ended on August 9, 2009.

1. "State of the Hogans" – Brooke's parents are in the middle of a nasty divorce. With her parents both dating new (younger) people, can she keep her sanity and be the rock of the broken family? Brooke and her roomies go to Clearwater Beach to meet with Hulk and his new girlfriend.
2. "I Kissed a Girl" – After a flurry of disappointing dates, Glenn is frustrated with the state of his love life. Brooke makes a shocking suggestion – maybe he should think about dating girls again. Glenn says you can't just switch teams, and challenges Brooke to think of it the same way: how does she know she doesn't like girls? So all the roommates decide to date girls for a night to see how the other half lives.
3. "Creepy Cruise" – Ashley and Brooke are paid to party on a yacht by a sleazy Italian millionaire but decide to get off when things get creepy. They end up in the Bahamas, trying to find a way back to Miami.
4. "My Mother's With Another" – Linda and Brooke try to reconcile; Nick visits Brooke's apartment for the first time since being released from jail.
5. "Brooke's New Beau" – Hulk sets up a musical collaboration for Brooke and Colby O'Donis.
6. "Hogans in Space" – When Hulk is invited to check out NASA's training center, he brings Brooke, Glenn, Ashley, and his girlfriend, Jennifer.
7. "Hometown Hero" – Glenn returns to his hometown in Michigan to give a speech at his old high school. Since revealing that he is gay, Glenn fears what his family and friends will think of him.
8. "Lost and Found" – Brooke and Ashley find a dog, but they are not allowed to have pets in the apartment. Unable to find the owner before their trip to Key West, they ask Hulk and Brian Knobs to watch the dog.
9. "Brooke Goes Green" – Ashley gets inspired by the green movement and tries to persuade her reluctant roommates to join the cause. But when she starts cutting off Brooke's showers and shutting lights off around the house, everyone gets annoyed at her.
10. "Hulk's Surgery" – While Brooke is preparing for her big comeback at Miami's annual Calle Ocho concert, she gets an unexpected call about her dad's health. Hulk was rushed to the hospital after collapsing at his home. He then decides to go under surgery to correct the problem on his back that has been bothering him for years. With Brooke worried about her dad's health, she is also concerned about how her performance will turn out at the concert.

== Reception ==
Melissa Camacho of Common Sense Media gave the show 2 out of 5 stars.
