= Hail the King =

Hail The King

Studio album by Fantan Mojah
- Released: November 8, 2005
- Genre: Reggae
- Label: Greensleeves Records
- Producer: Donovan Bennett, Matt Downs, Andrew Pendergrast, Cleveland Scott

Professional ratings
Review scores
| Source | Rating |
|---|---|
| Allmusic | 3/5 stars |

Hail the King is the debut album by reggae singer Fantan Mojah. It features the single "Hail the King", as well as a collaboration with Jah Cure entitled "Nuh Build Great Man".

== Track listing ==
1. Hail The King
2. Feel The Pain
3. Nuh Build Great Man (with Jah Cure)
4. Corruption
5. Hungry
6. Thanks & Praise
7. Love Grows
8. She Makes Me Feel So Nice
9. Rastafari Is The Ruler (with Mr. Flash)
10. Uplift Yourself (with First Born)
11. Search
12. Hail The King (remix)
13. Don't Bow Out
14. Murderer
15. Kings Of Kings
16. Corruption - (remix)
17. Authentic Love (with Mr. Flash)
18. Will I See You Again
