= For a Moment =

For a Moment may refer to:

- For a Moment (song), a song by Brooke Hogan
- For a Moment, a song from The Little Mermaid II: Return to the Sea
- For a Moment (album), a 2007 album by Maria Arredondo
- For a Moment, a song from Wonka
