= Murder of Jill Ann Weatherwax =

1998 homicide in California, United States

Jill Ann Weatherwax
- Born: October 26, 1970; Fenton, Michigan
- Died: March 24, 1998 (aged 27); Fresno, California, U.S.
- Cause of death: Homicide
- Resting place: Oakwood Cemetery, Fenton, Michigan
- Occupation: Model

Jill Ann Weatherwax (October 26, 1970 – March 24, 1998) was an American model and aspiring singer. A former "Miss Hollywood", Weatherwax was found stabbed on March 25, 1998, in Fresno, California. Her murder remains unsolved.

Weatherwax's life and death was the subject of a 1999 episode of E! True Hollywood Story entitled "The Murder of Miss Hollywood". She was interred in her hometown of Fenton, Michigan at Oakwood Cemetery.
