= Pitchfork (film) =

2016 film by Glenn Douglas Packard

- Directed by: Glenn Douglas Packard
- Written by: Darryl F. Gariglio; Glenn Douglas Packard
- Produced by: Shaun Cairo; Noreen Marriott; Darryl F. Gariglio; Glenn Douglas Packard
- Starring: Daniel Wilkinson; Brian Raetz; Lindsey Nicole; Ryan Moore
- Cinematography: Rey Gutierrez
- Edited by: Kristin Gerhart; Rey Gutierrez
- Music by: Christie Beu
- Production company: Pioneer Motion Pictures
- Distributed by: Uncork'd Entertainment
- Release dates: September 23, 2016 (Hot Springs Horror Film Festival); January 6, 2017; Limited Release
- Running time: 1:34:00
- Country: United States
- Language: English

Pitchfork is a 2016 award winning horror film and the directorial debut of Glenn Douglas Packard. It premiered on September 23, 2016, at the Hot Springs Horror Film Festival, where it won "Best First Time Filmmaker Horror". By September 20, 2016, it was announced in Deadline Hollywood that Uncork’d Entertainment had acquired the film and it would have a limited theatrical release on January 6, 2017, and would be released on VOD January 13 of the same year.

== Synopsis ==
Hunter and friends travel back to his family farm in rural Michigan after sharing a deep secret with his conservative family. A festive night turns into horror as one by one they are all stalked by a deranged killer wielding a pitchfork.

== Cast ==
- Daniel Wilkinson as Ben Holister Jr. / Pitchfork
- Brian Raetz as Hunter Killian
- Lindsey Nicole as Clare
- Ryan Moore as Matt
- Celina Beach as Lenox
- Nicole Dambro as Flo
- Keith Webb as Rocky
- Sheila Leason as Janelle
- Vibhu K Raghave as Gordon
- Rachel Carter as Judy Holister / Ma
- Andrew Dawe-Collins as Ben Holister Sr. / Pa
- Derek Reynolds as Wayne Killian
- Carol Ludwick as Ruth Killian
- Addisyn Wallace as Jenny Killian
- Anisbel Lopez as Trisha

== Reception ==
Pitchfork reviews have been mixed and the movie currently has a rating of 20% on Rotten Tomatoes with an average rating of 2/10, based on 5 reviews. The Hollywood Reporter and Los Angeles Times both criticized the film, which the Los Angeles Times felt was "tediously routine." Horror website Bloody Disgusting was more favorable, stating that "there is still some fun to be had with Pitchfork. The classic slasher formula works for a reason, and the movie does have some of that low-budget charm that’s so illusive in this age of digital film." Another horror website, Heaven of Horror, gave it a 3/5 rating and called it "a hardcore horror movie with a few campy elements and some truly awesome moments".
