= Stronger (Fantan Mojah album) =

Studio album by Fantan Mojah
- Released: November 19, 2008
- Genre: Reggae
- Label: Greensleeves Records
- Producer: Oliver Chastan, Phillip 'Titus' Harnett & Frenchie

Stronger is the second album by reggae singer Fantan Mojah. It features the single "Stronger", as well as a collaborations with Ninja Ford & Zareb.

== Track listing ==
1. Intro
2. Stronger
3. Jah Jah You Are The One feat. Ninja Ford
4. Dun Dem
5. Can't Frame I (judgement time riddim, Bost & Bim / Special delivery music)
6. Stay Positive
7. So Many Problems
8. No Ordinary Herb
9. Jah Time
10. How Can I Be Ungrateful feat. Zareb
11. Most High Jah
12. No Mercy feat. Zareb
13. Tell Lie Pon Rasta
14. Fight to Survive
15. Where Is Love
16. You Can Make It feat. Ninja Ford
