= Michael Jackson: 30th Anniversary Celebration =

2001 concert show by Michael Jackson

- Concert by Michael Jackson
- Promotional poster for Jackson's New York City show
- Associated album: Invincible
- Start date: September 7, 2001
- End date: September 10, 2001
- No. of shows: 2
- Box office: $10,072,105

Michael Jackson concert chronology
- MJ & Friends (1999); Michael Jackson: 30th Anniversary Celebration (2001); United We Stand: What More Can I Give (2001)

The Michael Jackson: 30th Anniversary Celebration was a concert show and television special by Michael Jackson. It was staged in Madison Square Garden in New York City on September 7 and 10, 2001. On November 13, 2001, the CBS television network aired the concerts as a two-hour special in honor of Jackson's thirtieth year as a solo entertainer (his first solo single, "Got to Be There", was recorded and released in 1971). The show was edited from footage of the two performances. Nielsen Media Research reported that an estimated 45 million people watched all or part of the special, making it one of the highest-rated musical specials in television history. Coincidentally, the 30th anniversary concert was also watched by 30 million viewers, on CBS, when it aired later the same year.

The shows sold out in two hours. Ticket prices were among the most expensive ever for an event; the best seats (with VIP access) cost $10,000, but included a dinner with Jackson and a signed poster. The show was choreographed by Glenn Douglas Packard and Brian Thomas, who were nominated for an Emmy Award for Outstanding Choreography. It was presented by David Gest, World Events LLC, and Clear Channel Entertainment. Jackson reportedly earned $7.5 million for each of the two concerts. The concert's official box-office taking was $10,072,105 for both concerts.

To some fans, Jackson appeared more disoriented in the first concert, as he only did one short moonwalk and improvised the ending of the "Billie Jean" performance. In 2011, presenter David Gest claimed that Jackson was on drugs during the concerts, in the documentary Michael Jackson: The Life of an Icon; however, despite taking pain medication, Jackson himself explained that he merely had not rehearsed for the first concert and was self-conscious of his performance. Contradictorily, in his book You Are Not Alone: Michael Through a Brother's Eyes, Michael's brother Jermaine Jackson said that during this time, Michael was taking Demerol, a pain-relieving medicine with reported psychotropic effects.

Regardless, the show was a major success, with appearances by numerous celebrities, athletes and actors, and performances with/by other musicians; Jackson himself performed "The Way You Make Me Feel" with Britney Spears, and Mya, Usher and Whitney Houston gave a rousing performance of "Wanna Be Startin' Somethin'". The two concerts were the only times Jackson performed any song from his album Invincible live.

== Setlists ==
=== Friday, September 7 ===
Performer(s)	Song
Samuel L. Jackson	Introduction
Usher; Mýa; Whitney Houston	"Wanna Be Startin' Somethin'"
Marlon Brando	Humanitarian Speech
Billy Gilman	"Ben"
Shaggy; Rayvon; Rikrok	"Angel" / "It Wasn't Me"
Monica; Al Jarreau; Jill Scott; Deborah Cox	"Home" "You Can't Win" "Ease On Down The Road"
James Ingram; Gloria Estefan	"I Just Can't Stop Loving You"
Marc Anthony	"She's Out Of My Life"
Monica, Tamia, Mýa, Deborah Cox and Rah Digga	"Heal the World"
Liza Minnelli	"You Are Not Alone" "Never Never Land" / "Over The Rainbow"
Destiny's Child	"Bootylicious"
Ray Charles; Cassandra Wilson	"Crying Time"
Elizabeth Taylor	Introducing The Jacksons
The Jacksons	The Jacksons's Ultimate Medley "Can You Feel It" (contains elements from "Great Gates Of Kiev") "ABC" "The Love You Save" "I'll Be There" "I Want You Back" "Dancing Machine" (with *NSYNC) "Shake Your Body (Down to the Ground)"
Michael Jackson; Britney Spears	"The Way You Make Me Feel"
Chris Tucker	Introducing Michael Jackson
Michael Jackson	"Billie Jean" "Black or White" / "Beat It" (with Jason Paige and Slash) "You Rock My World"
All artists	"We Are the World" "You Rock My World (Reprise)"

=== Monday, September 10 ===
Performer(s)	Song
Usher, Mýa and Deborah Cox	"Wanna Be Startin' Somethin'"
Dionne Warwick	"I'll Never Love This Way Again"
Lil' Romeo and Master P	"My Baby"
Gloria Gaynor	"I Will Survive"
98 Degrees, Usher and Luther Vandross	"Man in the Mirror"
Missy Elliott and Nelly Furtado	"Get Ur Freak On"
Billy Gilman	"Ben"
Liza Minnelli	"You Are Not Alone" "Never Never Land/Over The Rainbow"
Monica; Al Jarreau; Jill Scott; Deborah Cox	"Home" "You Can't Win" "Ease On Down The Road"
Gladys Knight	"I Heard It Though The Grapevine" "Midnight Train To Georgia"
Aaron Carter	"I Want Candy"
Monica, Tamia, Mýa, Deborah Cox and Rah Digga	"Heal The World"
Elizabeth Taylor	Introducing The Jacksons
The Jacksons	The Jacksons's Ultimate Medley "Can You Feel It" (contains elements from "Great Gates Of Kiev") "ABC" "The Love You Save" "I'll Be There" "I Want You Back" "Shake Your Body (Down to the Ground)"
Michael Jackson	"The Way You Make Me Feel"
Chris Tucker	Introducing Michael Jackson
Michael Jackson	"Billie Jean" "Black or White" / "Beat It" (with Jason Paige and Slash) "You Rock My World" (featuring Usher and Chris Tucker)

== Concert dates ==
Date	City	Country	Venue
September 7, 2001	New York City	United States	Madison Square Garden
September 10, 2001	New York City	United States	Madison Square Garden

Note: The second show was added two days earlier due to high demand.

== Aftermath ==
According to some sources, on September 11, 2001, Jackson, along with his personal assistant, Frank Cascio, were scheduled for a meeting at the World Trade Center, to return a "two million" dollar watch Jackson used for the concert, and a diamond necklace for Elizabeth Taylor, but overslept and did not make it. In a 2002 interview, Jackson made no mention of a meeting and said that he "got a call from friends in Saudi Arabia" of the attacks and watched the collapse of the Twin Towers on television. The claim that Jackson fled the city with Taylor and Marlon Brando has been disputed; he simply got his children packed for New Jersey. He also arranged to have dozens of stranded fans relocated and taken care of. In the aftermath of the attacks, Jackson sponsored a charity concert titled United We Stand: What More Can I Give. The concerts were held in Washington, D.C. Other featured artists that also performed in the benefit concert were the Backstreet Boys, Slash, Krystal Harris, Huey Lewis and the News, James Brown, Billy Gilman, O-Town, Usher, Christina Milian, Carole King, Al Green, Pink, Bette Midler, CeCe Peniston, Aerosmith, America, P. Diddy, NSYNC, Destiny's Child, Rod Stewart, Goo Goo Dolls, Train, Britney Spears, Mariah Carey, and Mary J. Blige. In addition, his sister Janet Jackson performed with him.

This event also marked Randy Jackson's final concert with his brothers. He would contribute backup vocals for Michael's posthumous 2009 song, "This Is It", along with his brothers Jackie, Tito, and Jermaine, before announcing his retirement from entertainment. From 2012 to 2013, the remaining brothers (without Randy) reunited for the Unity Tour, which was held in North America, Europe, Asia, Africa, and Oceania.

== Personnel ==
Lead performer

- Vocals, dance and choreographer: Michael Jackson

Additional performers

- Vocals: Marlon Jackson, Jermaine Jackson, Tito Jackson, Jackie Jackson, Randy Jackson and others

Band members

- Musical director: Greg Phillinganes and Joey Melotti
- Keyboards: Greg Phillinganes, Brad Buxer, Michael Boddicker, Michael Bearden and Randy Jackson
- Drums: Jonathan Moffett and Michael Baker
- Percussion: Bashiri Johnson
- Guitars: Slash, David Williams, Dwight Sills, Greg Moore and Tito Jackson
- Bass: Alex Al, Tom Barney and Jermaine Jackson

Music department

- Music supervisor: Sam Harris
- Arrangements: Greg Phillinganes, Joey Melotti and Jonathan Barrick
- Music mixer: Brad Buxer, Michael Durham Prince, Jim Caruana and Thomas Cadley
- Music recordist: Kooster McAllister
- Vocal director: Sam Harris

Choreographer

- Choreographer and dancer: Glenn Douglas Packard and Brian Thomas

Head of makeup department: Sajata Robinson
