= Urban Mystic =

American singer

- Born: Brandon Oneal Williams; November 30, 1984 (age 41); Fort Lauderdale, Florida, U.S.
- Genres: R&B; soul; Neo soul
- Occupations: Singer; songwriter
- Years active: 2003–present
- Labels: Urban Life Music Group; Realionaire Entertainment; Warner Bros.; SoBe Entertainment

Brandon Oneal Williams (born November 30, 1987), better known by his stage name Urban Mystic, is an American recording artist from Fort Lauderdale, Florida, United States. He is best known for his hit singles, "Where Were You" and "I Refuse". Mystic signed a record deal with indie label SoBe Entertainment and released his debut album Ghetto Revelations in 2004.

His second album Ghetto Revelations II was released in 2006. His third album GRIII: Old School 2 Nu Skool was released in 2009. His fourth album Ghetto Revelations IV: Love Intervention was released in 2013. His fifth album Soulful Classics was released in 2015.

== Early life ==
Williams was born the son of a church minister in 1987 in Fort Lauderdale, Florida, where he was also raised. In his early years, he developed an interest for music at his father's church. He attended Dillard High School in Fort Lauderdale where he sang at every pep rally, show and event that was held in order to get noticed. He even performed at the local "Sistrunk Historical Festival" held every year in honor of Dr. James Sistrunk, one of the first African-American Physicians in Broward County, Florida. He was looking forward to pursuing a musical career with support from his brother Christopher. He grew more familiar with the music industry and became active as songwriter and producer.

== Career ==
In 2003, Williams gave himself the moniker Urban Mystic which reflects both his street mentality and his singing talent. In 2004, Williams entered into a record deal with SoBe Entertainment. His debut album, Ghetto Revelations, released on November 30, 2004, included the Billboard R&B hit single "Where Were You", produced by KayGee. He also had worked with Red Spyda and El DeBarge on the album. The first single from his second album, "It's You", was released in 2005 and featured Paul Wall. In the same year, Williams joined the newfangled Spitkicker collective.

His second studio album, Ghetto Revelations II was released on March 21, 2006, and produced by Scott Storch, KayGee and Terence "Tramp-Baby" Abney. It reached #10 in the Heatseekers albums chart. The second single, "I Refuse", produced by Scott Storch and released in 2006, reached #36 in the Billboard Hot R&B/Hip-Hop Songs chart.

His third studio album, titled GRIII: Old School 2 Nu Skool, was released in April 2009. The album featured a genre mix of Neo soul and Contemporary R&B. His fourth studio album entitled Love Intervention, was released on February 26, 2013, via digital outlets. The first single off the album is called "In the Morning" featuring producer MDMA, it was released for a digital download on February 23, 2010. The second single "Name On It", it was released on April 3, 2012, via iTunes. The third single "I Promise" released on October 9, 2012, on iTunes. Love Intervention was released for physical retailers on April 16, 2013

Mystic released his fifth album Soulful Classics on July 31, 2015. It was preceded by the release of the singles "No Matter How High" and "Feel Good".

== Discography ==
=== Albums ===
List of albums, with selected chart positions
Title	Album details	Peak chart positions			
Title	Album details	US Heat	US Heat (SA)	US Heat (SC)	US R&B/HH
Ghetto Revelations	Released: November 30, 2004; Label: SoBe Entertainment; Format: CD, digital download	15	5	3	50
Ghetto Revelations II	Released: March 21, 2006; Label: SoBe Entertainment, Warner Bros. Records; Format: CD, digital download	10	6	5	28
GRIII: Old School 2 Nu Skool	Released: April 28, 2009; Label: SoBe Entertainment, Fontana Distribution; Format: CD, digital download	36	8	—	51
Ghetto Revelations IV: Love Intervention	Released: April 16, 2013; Label: SoBe Entertainment, INgrooves, Fontana Distribution; Format: CD, digital download	—	10	—	71
Soulful Classics	Released: July 31, 2015; Label: SoBe Entertainment; Format: CD, digital download	—	—	—	—

=== Singles ===
Year	Single	Chart position				Album
Year	Single	US Bub.	US R&B/ HH	US Adult R&B	US R&B/HH Airplay	Album
2004	"Where Were You?"	—	73	—	72	Ghetto Revelations
2005	"It's You" (featuring Paul Wall)	—	61	—	—	Ghetto Revelations II
2006	"I Refuse"	—	36	5	35	Ghetto Revelations II
2008	"Can't Stop, Won't Stop"	—	—	—	—	GRIII: Old School 2 Nu Skool
2008	"Main Squeeze" (featuring Yung Joc)	—	13	—	—	GRIII: Old School 2 Nu Skool
2009	"Best Part of the Day"	—	66	16	66	GRIII: Old School 2 Nu Skool
2010	"In the Morning" (featuring MDMA)	—	51	12	51	Ghetto Revelations IV: Love Intervention
2012	"Name On It"	—	45	7	45	Ghetto Revelations IV: Love Intervention
2012	"I Promise"	—	—	10	44	Ghetto Revelations IV: Love Intervention
2014	"No Matter How High"	—	—	—	—	Soulful Classics
2014	"Feel Good"	—	—	22	—	Soulful Classics
2018	"Be Mine"	—	—	—	—	
2019	"Love High" (feat. Steve Casper)	—	—	—	—	Underrated
2019	"She Want It"	—	—	—	—	Underrated
2020	"Lockdown"	—	—	—	—	Underrated
2020	"Change"	—	—	—	—	
2020	"Quarantine (feat. Swayfromdaway)"	—	—	—	—	
2021	"Emotions"	—	—	—	—	
2022	Love Like This Again	—	—	—	—	
2022	Pulling Out	—	—	—	—	
2023	Keep It Moving	—	—	—	—	
2023	Feenin	—	—	—	—	
"—" denotes a recording that did not chart or was not released in that territory.
