= Nick Hogan =

American reality TV personality (born 1990)

- Born: 1990 (age 35–36); Los Angeles, California, U.S.
- Occupation: Freestyle Wrestling Commissioner
- Years active: 2005–2009
- Organization: Real American Freestyle
- Television: Hogan Knows Best (2005–2007); Brooke Knows Best (2008–2009)
- Spouse: Tana Lea (m. 2025)
- Parent(s): Hulk Hogan (father); Linda Claridge (mother)
- Family: Brooke Hogan (sister); Horace Hogan (cousin)

Nick Bollea (born 1990), also known as Nick Hogan, is an American wrestling commissioner and former television personality. He is known for his appearances on the reality show Hogan Knows Best, and its spin-off Brooke Knows Best, featuring his father Hulk Hogan and older sister Brooke Hogan. Hogan became the acting commissioner of Real American Freestyle (RAF) in 2025, following his father's death.

== Motorsports ==
Hogan earned a Formula D competition license in 2006 from Formula Drift, the only professional drifting series in North America, and competed in one of their competitions, the event in Atlanta on May 12, 2007.

Hogan was active in the NOPI Drift series, qualified 10th at the Denver NOPI drift event of 2007, and placed third at their Pittsburgh event. He occasionally attended amateur drifting competitions. According to Chris Tyler, a drift event organizer, Hogan attended an event the Friday prior to his 2007 crash. Hogan did not compete; he gave drifting demonstrations between the runs of competitors.

Hogan's celebrity status and enthusiasm for drifting attracted sponsors. He was briefly signed to Dodge, but company spokesman Todd Goyer said that he "is not a Dodge driver or a Mopar driver", and that his relationship with Dodge/Mopar ended two months prior to his 2007 crash. He was sponsored for the 2007 season by Polaroid, Mac Tools, BF Goodrich and Sparco. Polaroid did not renew their sponsorship of Hogan for the 2008 race season.

Hogan had two Dodge Vipers with steering modified to enhance their drifting capability, but his last competition vehicle was a Nissan 350Z.

== Vehicular incidents ==
On September 13, 2006, in Bay Harbor Islands, Florida, Hogan was driving a yellow 2001 Lamborghini Diablo VT owned by Cecile Barker (chairman of SoBe Entertainment, the record label attached to his sister) when it caught on fire. Miami-Dade Fire Rescue spokesman Paul Perry said, "It was a normal car fire. It happens a bunch of times every day and nobody notices."

=== 2007 crash and imprisonment ===
On the evening of August 26, 2007, just 16 days after his fourth speeding ticket in 11 months, the 17-year-old Hogan was driving his Toyota Supra and was involved in a serious crash in Clearwater, Florida. Hogan and his passenger, 22-year-old John Graziano, were flown to Bayfront Medical Center in St. Petersburg, Florida. Hogan was released from care on August 27 and said to be "OK". Graziano, a U.S. Marine and a member of Hogan's pit crew, was not wearing a seatbelt.

The eye and brain injuries he sustained were expected to leave him in a nursing home for the rest of his life. In September 2009, Graziano returned to his home where he continued to receive full-time care.

Hogan was charged with several violations for the crash, including a felony. He turned himself in to authorities on Wednesday, November 7, 2007, and was released within hours on $10,000 bail. Hogan was charged with reckless driving involving serious bodily injury (a 3rd degree felony, punishable by up to 5 years in prison plus fines), use of a motor vehicle in commission of a felony, a person under the age of 21 operating a vehicle with a blood alcohol level of 0.02% or higher, and illegal window tint. Two hours after the wreck, Hogan's blood alcohol content was 0.055%.

On May 9, 2008, Hogan entered a no contest plea and was sentenced to eight months in Pinellas County Jail. The sentence also called for Hogan to serve five years of probation, 500 community service hours, and his driver's license was suspended for three years. Hogan was separated from the general jail population because he was a minor. Soon after, Hogan was moved to join three other juvenile inmates.

On October 21, 2008, Hogan was released from the Pinellas County Jail due to "good time" credit and moved to his mother's home in Clearwater, Florida. On May 4, 2012, Hogan was granted early release from felony probation.

=== 2023 DUI charge and probation ===
On November 18, 2023, Hogan was arrested for DUI in Clearwater, Florida. Hogan's father was on the scene during the arrest for aid. On June 21, 2024, Hogan was sentenced to one year of probation for the incident.

== Personal life ==
Hogan began dating Tana Lea in 2019 and married her in January 2025.

Hogan and his wife appeared onstage during the July 28, 2025 episode of WWE Raw during a ten-bell salute ceremony after his father's death. They appeared in the audience at Summer Slam on August 2, 2025 as the WWE event played his father's classic theme song, "Real American," at the end of a tribute video.

Following his father's death, Hogan was named the sole heir of his estate, and took over his role as commissioner of Real American Freestyle.
