= Freedom Blues =

Studio album by Jah Cure
- Released: March 28, 2005 (UK)
- Genre: Reggae, Roots
- Length: 63:28
- Label: VP Records
- Producer: Phillip Burrell, Morgan Heritage, Beres Hammond, Melbourne George Miller, Syl Gordon, Colin Levy, Shadow Man

Jah Cure chronology
Ghetto Life (2003)	Freedom Blues (2005)	True Reflections...A New Beginning (2007)

Freedom Blues is the third album from Jamaican reggae musician Jah Cure. It was released in 2005 and includes contributions from Sizzla.

== Track listing ==
1. Songs Of Freedom
2. Jah Bless Me
3. Good Morning Jah Jah
4. Sunny Day
5. King In The Jungle
6. Chant
7. Troddin' The Valley
8. Spread Jah Love
9. Love Is The Solution
10. Guide Us Jah
11. Praises
12. Get Up Stand Up
13. Give It To Them
14. Dancehall Vibe
15. Move On
16. Hi Hi
