= Ghetto Life =

Studio album by Jah Cure
- Released: March 17, 2003 (UK)
- Genre: Reggae, Roots
- Length: 57:25
- Label: VP Records
- Producer: Beres Hammond

Jah Cure chronology
Free Jah's Cure The Album the Truth (2000)	Ghetto Life (2003)	Freedom Blues (2005)

Professional ratings
Review scores
Source	Rating
Allmusic	4/5 stars

Ghetto Life is the second album from Jamaican reggae musician Jah Cure. It was released in 2003 and includes contributions from Sizzla and Jah Mason.

== Track listing ==
1. Every Song I Sing
2. King in This Jungle featuring Sizzla
3. Western Region
4. Zion Way
5. Run Come Love Me featuring Jah Mason
6. Zion Await
7. Hail to the King
8. Trust Me
9. Ghetto Life
10. How Can I
11. The Love of My Life
12. Hanging Slowly
13. Dung in Deh
14. Vibes Man a Build
15. Keep On
