= Baldwin brothers (disambiguation) =

The Baldwin brothers are four American actors.

Baldwin brothers may also refer to:

- The Baldwin Brothers, a Chicago band (including no one named Baldwin)
- The Baldwin Brothers (film), a 1996 television documentary about the acting family
