= Brooke Hogan =

American television personality and singer (born 1988)

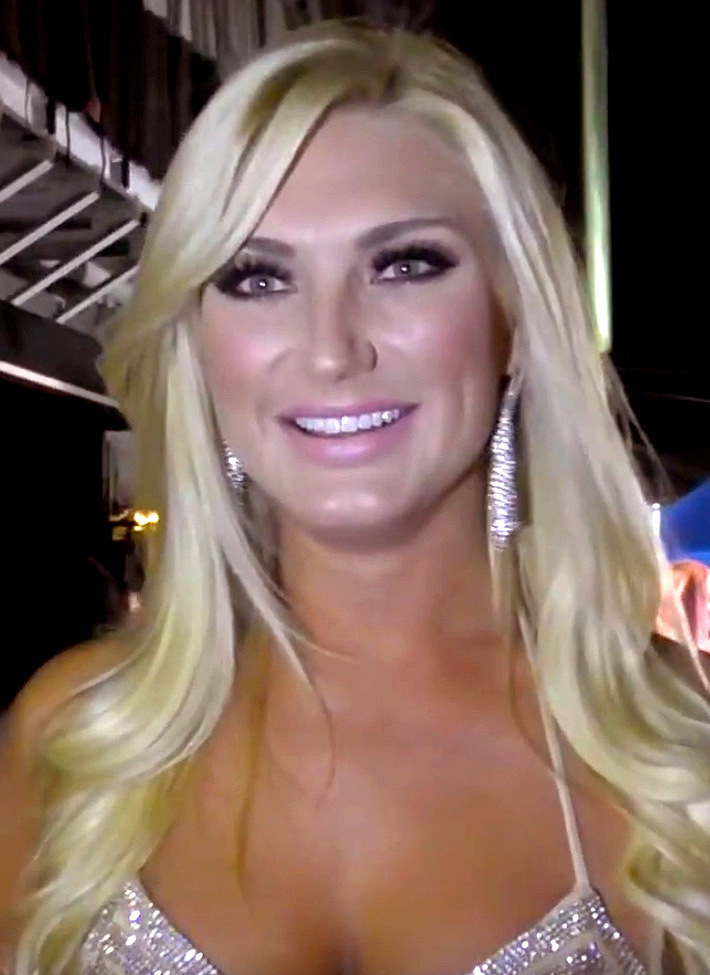
- Hogan in 2016
- Born: Brooke Ellen Bollea; May 5, 1988 (age 38); Tampa, Florida, U.S.
- Occupations: Television personality; singer
- Years active: 2002–present
- Spouse: Steven Oleksy (m. 2022)
- Children: 2
- Parent(s): Hulk Hogan (father); Linda Claridge (mother)
- Relatives: Nick Hogan (brother); Horace Hogan (cousin)
- Musical career
- Genres: Pop; dance-pop; R&B
- Instrument: Vocals
- Labels: Fontana; Storch; SoBe
- Website: brookehogan.com

Brooke Ellen Oleksy (née Bollea, born May 5, 1988), better known by her stage name Brooke Hogan, is an American television personality and singer. The daughter of professional wrestler Hulk Hogan, she starred in the reality television series Hogan Knows Best from 2005 to 2007. The show saw a then-teenage Brooke struggling with her father while pursuing her musical career.

As a recording artist, she used the show and her appearance on a one-hour special on VH1 to promote her musical work. She signed with SoBe Entertainment and record producer Scott Storch to release her debut studio album, Undiscovered (2006), which moderately entered the Billboard 200. It was led by the single "About Us" (featuring Paul Wall), which peaked within the top 40 of the Billboard Hot 100.

From 2008 to 2009, Hogan starred in her own television series, Brooke Knows Best. Though her parents and brother made numerous appearances throughout the series, it mainly focused on Brooke and the recording of her music. Her second album, The Redemption (2009), was released independently and narrowly entered the Billboard 200. Following the conclusion of Brooke Knows Best, Hogan has made numerous appearances in various media. In 2012, Hogan signed with Total Nonstop Action Wrestling (TNA) as an on-screen personality manager for their female division, The Knockouts.

== Early life ==
Brooke Ellen Bollea was born May 5, 1988, in Tampa, Florida, the daughter of Hulk Hogan (Terry Gene Bollea; 1953–2025) and Linda Claridge. She has a younger brother, Nick.

In high school, she took dance classes, voice lessons, piano lessons, and gymnastics. She joined the cheerleading squad of her Clearwater, Florida school, Clearwater Central Catholic High School, in her first year (though she only stayed at the school for the first half of first year). She also sang in chorus for CCCHS. Hogan graduated from high school at the age of sixteen.

== Career ==
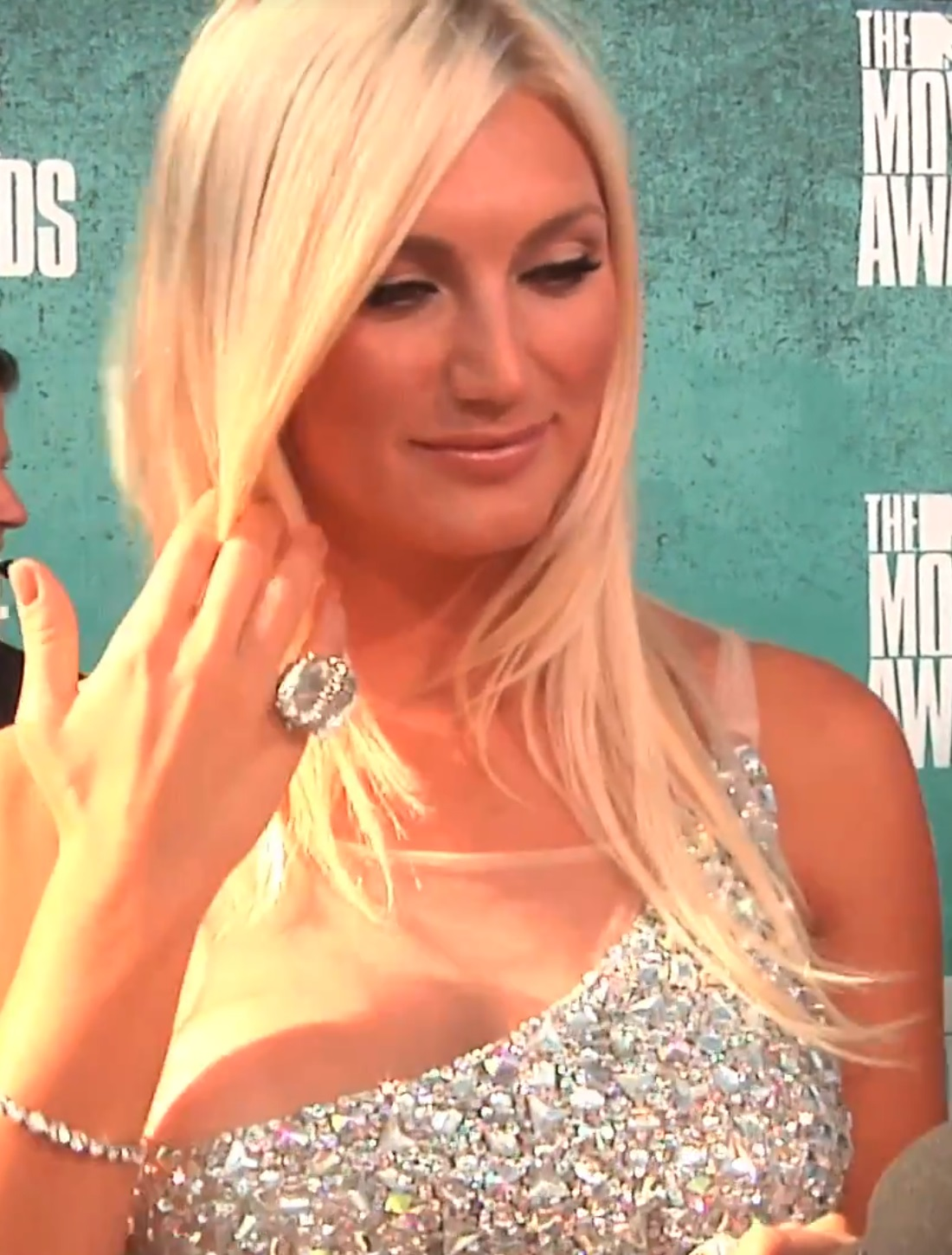
Hogan being interviewed at the MTV Movie Awards 2012

=== 2002–2005: Music beginnings and reality series ===
Hogan was signed to Trans Continental Records in 2002. Some music was produced with LFO member Rich Cronin's assistance. The album's lead single, "Everything to Me", was released in July 2004. The song appeared at number one on the Hot 100 Singles Sales chart in the United States, and number 97 on the Billboard Hot 100. To promote the album, Hogan toured with Hilary Duff on her Most Wanted Tour throughout the US, as well as with the Backstreet Boys on their Up Close & Personal Tour, both of which took place from mid 2004 to early 2005. The album, Brooke Hogan: This Voice, was slated for a September 21, 2004 release date, but the album was not released due to TransContinental Records' bankruptcy.

Hogan and her father appeared in the hour-long profile (Inside) Out: Hulk Hogan, Stage Dad on VH1. The television special chronicled Hogan working on her debut album, as well as showed her father chaperoning her in the album making process. Her father later stated that one aim of the show was to help promote Brooke and her upcoming music career. The special was a major success for the network, which led to VH1 turning it into an entire television series, titled Hogan Knows Best. The series premiered in July 2005, and was the highest rated series in the network's history. The show chronicled the Hogan family's life together, although it mainly focused on Brooke and her over protective father. On the show, Hulk placed a GPS tracker on Brooke's vehicle that enabled him to track her whereabouts and shut down the engine of her car remotely.

=== 2006–2008: Undiscovered and Brooke Knows Best ===
In 2006, Hogan became the first artist signed to Scott Storch's label, initially called Storchaveli Records, but later named Storch Music Company. She also signed with SoBe Entertainment. Storch also became the album's main producer. During an interview, Hogan stated that she was recording the album at The Hit Factory in Miami, Florida, where rapper Paul Wall heard a clip of the song "About Us" and asked to be on the song.

The lead single from the album, "About Us", was premiered on the season two finale of Hogan Knows Best. It quickly began receiving heavy radio rotation, and peaked at number 33 the Billboard Hot 100. Undiscovered was released on October 24, 2006 in the United States and Canada. The album debuted at number 28 on the Billboard 200, and number 1 on the Independent Albums charts in the US, selling an estimated 30,000 copies in its first week of release.

To help promote the album, Hogan appeared in the November 2006 edition of FHM, becoming the first FHM cover model under 21 years old. As a result, the November issue had no liquor advertising. Dana Leslie Fields, executive publisher and president of FHM, said: "In the very rare instance that you might have a cover star under the age of 21, they don't want to be in the position of seeming to market to anyone under age."

To further promote the album, Hogan announced its second single would be "Heaven Baby", which featured Beenie Man on guest vocals. The song was released to pop radio in January 2007. On March 6, "For A Moment" was released as a promotional single from the album, with a music video featuring clips of the third and fourth seasons of Hogan Knows Best.

While working on her second studio album, the series Hogan Knows Best was discontinued due to controversies involving Brooke's immediate family. As a result, Brooke was approached by VH1 awhile thereafter and signed on to do her own series, Brooke Knows Best. The series premiered on July 13, 2008, and featured Hogan dealing with her family's problems, her music career, and her life while no longer living with her parents nor dependent on them. The show consisted of her friends, Glenn and Ashley – who are often encouraging Brooke to get out, have fun, and party. Brooke, Glenn, and Ashley live in a penthouse in South Beach. The show chronicled the problems Brooke faced while dealing with the divorce of her parents, as well as brother Nick Hogan's prior arrest related to a serious car accident in which he permanently injured his best friend. The series ended in 2009 after two seasons.

=== 2009–present: The Redemption and film debut ===
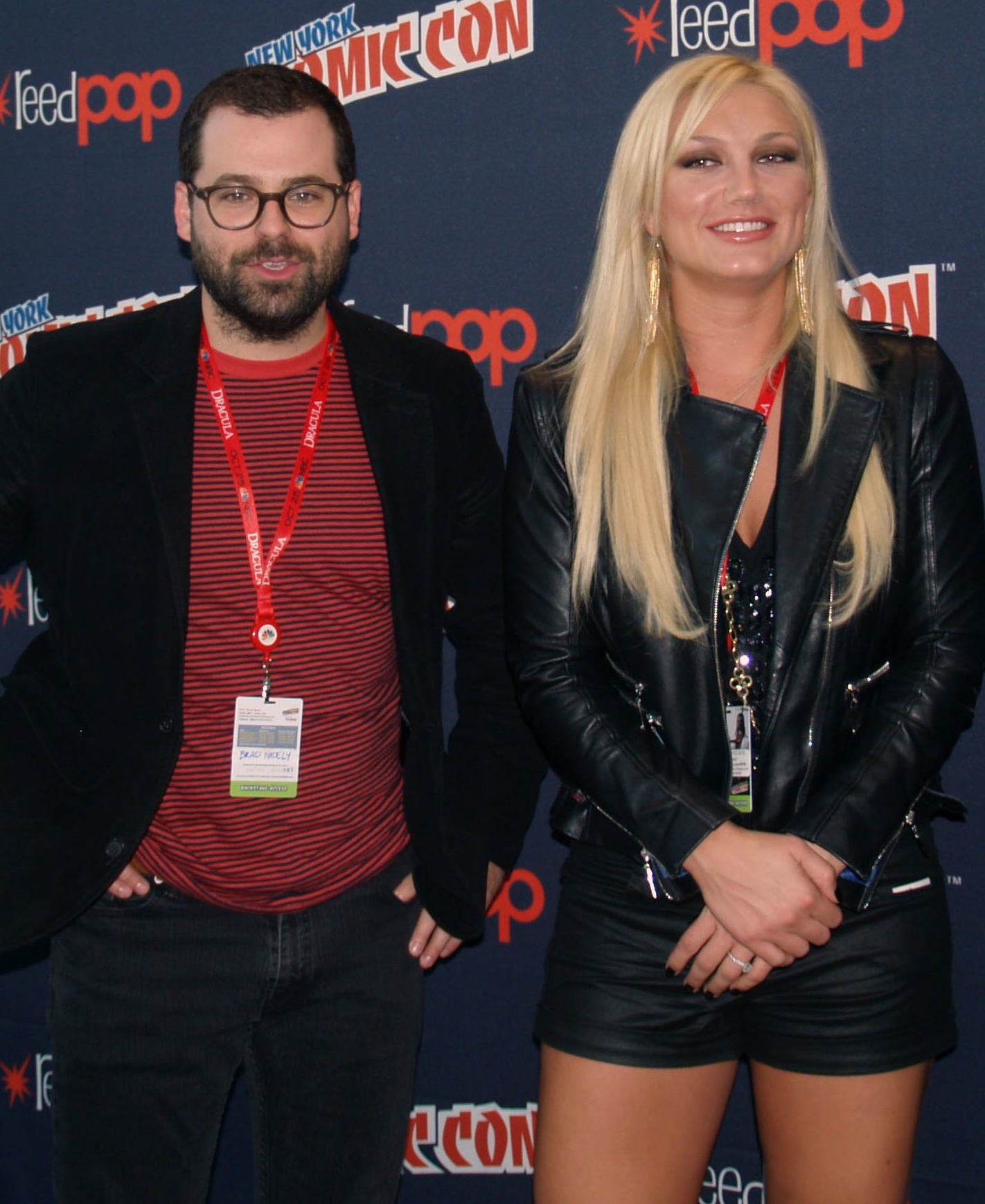
Hogan with Brad Neely, creator of the animated TV series China, IL, on which she has done voice work

In early 2009, Hogan announced the title of her second album to be The Redemption. The album's lead single, "Falling", featured rapper Stacks, and was released on March 31, 2009. On June 30, Hogan released the album's second single, "Hey Yo!", which featured Colby O'Donis on guest vocals. On July 4, Hogan released a mixtape, titled "Judgement Day", to help promote the release of the album. The mixtape caused a buzz online after the song 'Ur Not That Hot' was seen as a diss toward The Hills star, and fellow pop singer, Heidi Montag. The song also includes a fake voicemail that Hogan implies was sent to her from Montag. The Redemption was released on July 21 in the US and Canada for digital download and as a physical copy. It debuted at number 144 on the Billboard 200, and 27 on the Independent Albums chart, selling 3,381 copies in its first week. She parted ways with SoBe Entertainment after the promotion for the album concluded.

In November 2009 Hogan was featured in Toni Braxton's music video for "Yesterday". In late 2009, Hogan made her first film appearance in the live action film Little Hercules in 3D, which was only released in certain territories outside of the US. It was released on October 8, 2009 in Kazakhstan and Russia, and in the Czech Republic on January 7, 2010.

Hogan appeared as Kate in the science fiction film 2 Headed Shark Attack, which was released on January 17, 2012 in the United States. She also appeared as Sandy Powers in the film "Sand Sharks", which was released on January 9 in the United Kingdom. She also performed as a voice actor for multiple characters on Adult Swim’s show, China, IL.

She confirmed on June 12, 2014 via her official Instagram account, that her new single would be called "Beautiful" and set a release date for fall of 2014. On July 13, 2015, Hogan released her first alternative country track titled "Girlfriend" on iTunes. In September 2015 Hogan released her first extended play ‘I Wanna Be Your Girlfriend’. In 2018 she released a follow-up EP ‘So Many Summers’. On November 1, 2019, Hogan released her newest pop single titled "Touch My Body." An accompanying music video was released a week later on November 8, 2019.

Brooke started her own design company in 2018. Brooke Hogan is the founder of BB Designs by Brooke. BB Designs By Brooke creates residential home staging.

On May 15, 2026, Hogan released a cover version of Aaliyah's 2000 number-one single "Try Again". She faced criticism online, with people thinking Hogan shouldn't do an Aaliyah cover as the former isn't black.

== Professional wrestling career ==
=== World Wrestling Entertainment (2006) ===
Brooke made her WWE debut on the July 15, 2006 episode of Saturday Night's Main Event XXXIII, appearing with her father. Randy Orton came out and flirted with Brooke then challenged Hulk to a match at SummerSlam. Later in the parking lot after more flirting, Brooke got in their car and was unaware Orton would RKO Hulk. Orton would later appear on WWE Raw with a fake Hogan family and kissed the fake Brooke.

=== Total Nonstop Action Wrestling (2012–2013) ===
On May 17, 2012, Total Nonstop Action Wrestling (TNA), the wrestling promotion where her father worked, announced that Brooke had signed on to work in the promotion as an on-screen authority figure and a backstage consultant to the TNA Knockouts.

In July 2012, Brooke confirmed via her official Twitter account, that she has continued to write and develop her third studio album. Throughout the mid-2012, she has been appearing on Total Nonstop Action Wrestling (TNA), weekly on Thursday nights to help promote the female's wrestling division. On the June 7 episode of Impact Wrestling, a week after Hogan's TNA debut, Hogan gave Mickie James, Tara, Velvet Sky and Miss Tessmacher (now changed back to Brooke Tessmacher) a chance in a four-way match to earn another shot at Gail Kim's TNA Women's Knockout Championship, which was won by Miss Tessmacher. In June 2012, Hogan gave Velvet Sky a part featured in Montgomery Gentry's music video for their song "So Called Life". On the June 21 episode of Impact Wrestling, Hogan chose James over Sky as the next challenger for the Women's Knockout Championship, but failed to recapture the title from Miss Tessmacher.

In July, Hulk Hogan, alongside Sting, began feuding with a mysterious group of masked men, who had dubbed themselves the Aces & Eights. The group's attack on Hulk Hogan on the July 12 episode of Impact Wrestling was used to write Hulk Hogan off the show, as he was set to undergo another back surgery. On the August 16, 2012 episode of Impact, Hogan hired Taryn Terrell, as the referee for the TNA Women's Knockout Championship match between Madison Rayne and Miss Tessmacher. In November, Hogan would move into a storyline with her father and Bully Ray after Austin Aries revealed a secret relationship between herself and Ray. After seeing them kissing in a parking garage on the December 20 episode of Impact Wrestling, Hulk suspended Ray indefinitely on the January 3, 2013, episode. The following week, after Ray saved Hogan from a kidnapping by the Aces & Eights, Hogan accepted his marriage proposal much to her father's dismay. The ceremony took place the next week on Impact Wrestling, where Ray's groomsman Tazz interrupted and revealed himself to be a member of Aces & Eights, leading to the group attacking Ray, Hulk Hogan, and the rest of the groomsmen. On the February 21 edition of Impact, after listening to Hogan plea, Hulk Hogan named Bully Ray the number one contender for the World Heavyweight Championship at Lockdown. At this event, Bully Ray would turn his back on Hogan and TNA by revealing himself as the president of the Aces & Eights. On the following episodes of Impact, Bully Ray touted the fact that the public bought into his deceptive act the entire time to earn the trust of Sting, Hogan, and Hulk Hogan as a way to get a chance to capture the TNA World Title. Hogan continued to seek a divorce from her husband and got it ending the storyline. On August 16, 2013 it was reported that Hogan had parted ways with TNA.

== Personal life ==
Hogan was engaged to former Dallas Cowboys center Phil Costa. She ended the engagement in November 2013.

In 2015, an audio recording (and its transcripts) of her father Hulk Hogan making comments about her and using racial slurs in regard to her dating a black man at the time became the center of controversy that resulted in his contract with the WWE ending. Hulk Hogan's comments described himself as the ideal husband and that he would bring "Hulkamania" on anyone who married his daughter. In response, she wrote a poem defending him.

Brooke married professional ice hockey defenseman Steven Oleksy on June 8, 2022, in a private ceremony in Orlando, Florida.

On January 18, 2025, it was announced that the couple had fraternal twins, born January 15, 2025.

Brooke has been long estranged from her mother, and eventually also became estranged from her father in 2023. Her father never met Brooke's first two children, who were also at the time his only grandchildren, before his death in July 2025.

Brooke Hogan did not attend her father Hulk Hogan's funeral after years of estrangement, claiming he "didn't want" an official memorial service. She posted at length on Instagram about her father's death, her grieving process, and her visit to the beach with her husband and children to commemorate her father.

== Awards and nominations ==
Award	Year	Nominee(s)	Category	Result	Ref.
Teen Choice Awards	2006	Herself	Choice Grill	Won	
Teen Choice Awards	2006	Herself	Choice TV: Female Reality Star	Nominated	

== Filmography ==
Film
Year	Name	Role	Notes
2005	Day of the Dead 2: Contagium	Nurse	
2009	Little Hercules in 3D	Robin	Cameo role
2011	Sand Sharks	Sandy Powers	
2012	2-Headed Shark Attack	Kate	
2015	L.A. Slasher	The Reality Star	
2017	Give Me My Baby	Shannon	

Television
Year	Name	Role	Notes
2005–2007	Hogan Knows Best	Herself	35 episodes
2007	Wild 'n Out	Herself	Episode: "The Jump Off Special"
2008	America's Prom Queen	Herself/Panelist	6 episodes
2008–2009	Brooke Knows Best	Herself	21 episodes
2012	Scare Tactics	Female Zombie	Episode: "Driver's Dead"
2012–2013	China, IL	Various	10 episodes
2012–2013	Impact Wrestling	Herself	3 episodes
2017	Glow	Amber Fredrickson	Episode: "Maybe It's All the Disco"
2018	The Challenge: Champs vs. Stars (season 2)	Herself	9 episodes

== Discography ==
Studio albums

Year	Album details	Peak chart positions		US Sales
Year	Album details	US	US Indie	US Sales
2006	Undiscovered: Released: October 24, 2006; Label: SoBe, SMC; Format: CD, digital download	28	1	US sales: 127,000
2009	The Redemption: Released: July 21, 2009; Label: SoBe, Fontana; Format: CD, digital download	144	27	

=== Mixtapes ===
List of mixtapes, with year released
Title	Album details
Judgement Day	Released: July 4, 2009; Label: Self-released; Format: Digital download

=== Extended plays ===
List of extended plays with selected chart positions
Title	Details	Peak chart positions					
Title	Details	US	US R&B	US Country	AUS	CAN	NZ
I Wanna Be Your Girlfriend	Released: September 4, 2015; Label: MollyDog Entertainment; Format: CD, digital download	—	—	—	—	—	—
So Many Summers	Released: April 13, 2018; Label: MollyDog Entertainment; Format: Digital download	—	—	—	—	—	—

=== Singles ===
Year	Title	U.S. Billboard Chart positions				Album
Year	Title	U.S.	U.S. Pop	U.S. Dance	Rhythmic Top 40	Album
2004	Everything to Me	97	—	—	—	Non-album single
2006	"About Us" (featuring Paul Wall)	33	34	35	21	Undiscovered
2009	"Falling" (featuring Stacks)	—	—	—	—	The Redemption
2009	"Hey Yo!" (featuring Colby O'Donis)	—	—	—	—	The Redemption
2015	"Girfriend"	―	―	―	―	I Wanna Be Your Girlfriend
2017	"Taste Like Summer"	―	―	―	―	Non-album single
2018	"Ride the WAV"	―	―	―	―	Non-album single
2019	"Touch My Body"	―	―	―	―	Non-album single
2020	"Move"	―	―	―	―	Non-album single
2024	"Boomerang"	—	—	—	—	Non-album single
2024	"Love People"	—	—	—	—	Non-album single
2024	"Don’t Know It Yet"	—	—	—	—	Non-album single
2024	"Boys Trip"	—	—	—	—	Non-album single
2026	"Try Again"	―	―	―	―	Non-album single
