= Jah Cure =

Jamaican musician

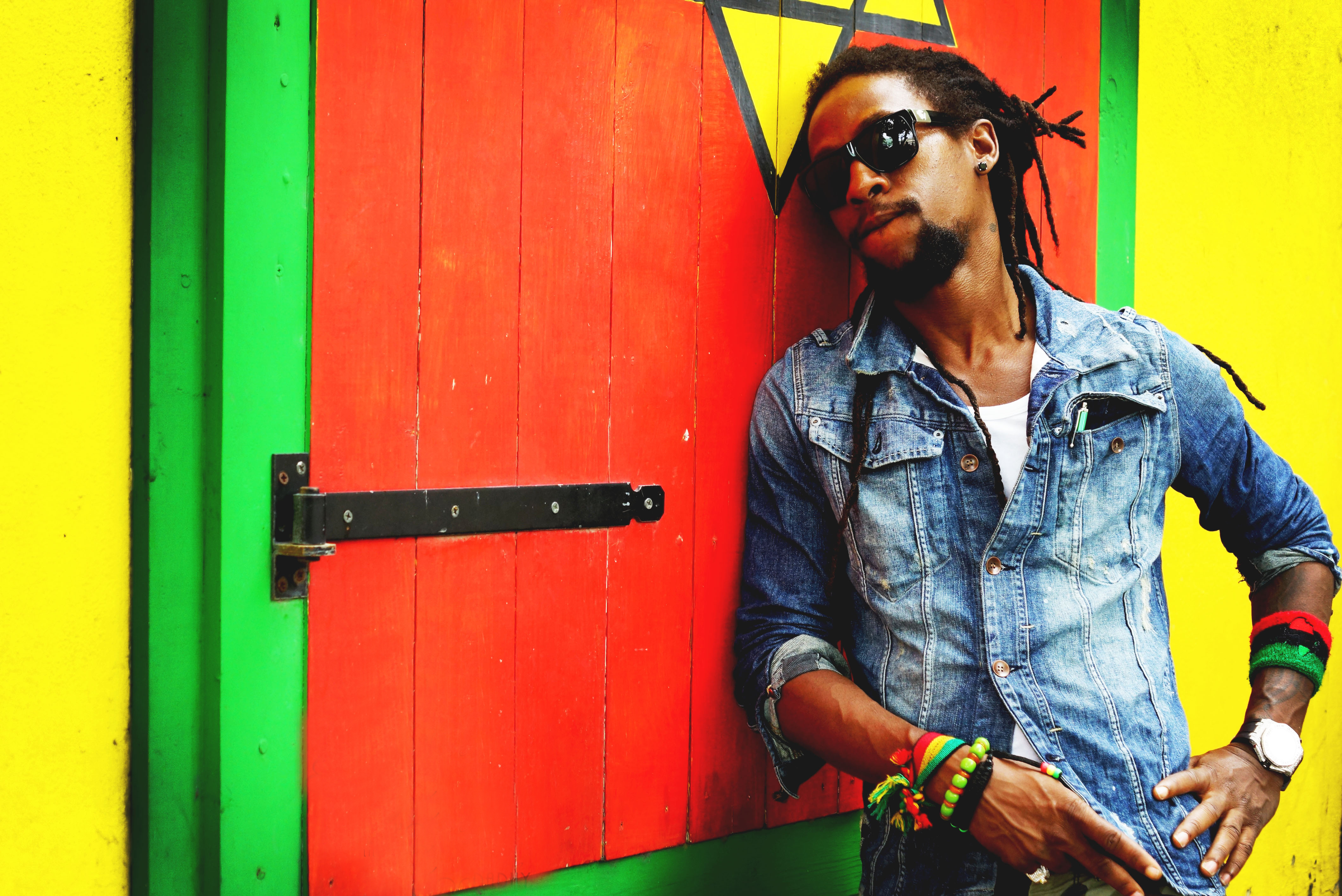

Background information
- Born: Siccature Alcock; 11 October 1978 (age 47); Hanover Parish, Jamaica
- Origin: Kingston, Jamaica
- Genres: Reggae, lovers rock, roots reggae
- Years active: 1997–present
- Labels: VP Records, Iyah Cure Music Ltd., SoBe Entertainment

Jah Cure, or Iyah Cure (born Siccature Alcock on 11 October 1978) is a Jamaican reggae musician. Raised in Kingston, he was given the name Jah Cure by Capleton.

== Career ==
Cure was born in Hanover, Jamaica. His first major break came in March 1997 with the release of the single "King in This Jungle", a duet with Sizzla produced by Beres Hammond. Hammond subsequently went on to become Cure's mentor, guiding his early career and producing much of his studio work. In 1998, Cure joined Hammond and the Harmony House family on a European tour and performed across several Caribbean islands.

Cure released three albums and a number of singles from prison, some of which have topped the Jamaican chart. His first album Free Jah's Cure The Album the Truth was released in 2000, it was followed by Ghetto Life in 2003 and Freedom Blues in 2005. More recently Cure has released the songs "Love Is", "Longing For" and "True Reflections", showing his unique voice and lyrical ability. Three days later releasing from the prison, his fourth album, True Reflections...A New Beginning was released.

His first concert after he was released took place in the Netherlands at the Reggae Sundance festival in August 2007. He was the last and headlining act.

He is signed to Iyah Cure Productions and VP Records.

In 2008, Jah Cure released "Hot Long Time" feat. Junior Reid Universal Cure, Jah Cure's 5th studio album, was to be released on 25 November 2008, but was postponed to a "mid 2009" release and " Call On Me " featuring Phyllisia. "The Universal Cure was released in the US on 14 April 2009. The album features "Hot Long Time" (featuring Junior Reid, Flo Rida, and Mavado.), as well as "Mr. Jailer" and "Journey", he also released "Never Find" that same year. The album was the first recorded album since his release from prison. At the end of 2010, following the success of Jah Cure's single "Unconditional Love" again featuring Phyllisia. SoBe Entertainment released the second single off Jah Cure's upcoming World Cry album, titled "Like I See It" featuring Rick Ross and Mavado. And a soca version of "Call On Me" featuring Alison Hinds. On October, SoBe Entertainment digitally released Jah Cure's 6th studio album, World Cry. The physical release was scheduled for 29 January 2013.

His album The Cure was released in July 2015. It topped the Billboard Reggae Albums chart in its first week of release and was nominated for a Grammy Award for Best Reggae Album in 2016.

His album "Royal Soldier" was released in August 2019 on VP Records. It debuted at number one on the Billboard Reggae Chart. Singles off the album include "Telephone Love", "Risk It All", "Life is Real", "Marijuana" and "Pretty Face".

== Legal issues ==
In November 1998, while driving around Montego Bay, Cure was pulled over by police and arrested on charges of gun possession, robbery and rape. He was prosecuted before the Gun Court. In April 1999, found guilty and sentenced to 15 years in prison. Cure was transferred from the St. Catherine Adult Correctional Centre to the Tower Street Adult Correctional Centre, which had a digital recording studio the inmates could use. He was released on parole on 28 July 2007, after serving eight years.

On 1 October 2021, Cure was arrested in Amsterdam after having stabbed a music promoter in the stomach. On 22 March 2022, he was found guilty and was initially sentenced to six years in prison, but following an appeal, the sentence was increased to nine and a half years.

== Personal life ==
Jah Cure married TV host & producer Kamila McDonald on 7 August 2011 in Sandy Bay Hanover. Their daughter was born on 20 February 2012, named Kailani Belle which means "Beautiful Chief from the heavens". The couple divorced in August 2017.

== Discography ==
Year	Album title	Label
2000	Free Jah's Cure The Album the Truth	J&D; Charm; Jet Star; Ernie B's
2003	Ghetto Life	VP
2005	Freedom Blues	VP
2007	True Reflections...A New Beginning	VP
2009	The Universal Cure	SoBe
2013	World Cry	SoBe
2015	The Cure	VP
2019	Royal Soldier	VP
2023	Undeniable	VP
