= Hogan Knows Best =

American reality television series

- Genre: Reality
- Directed by: Scott Bennett
- Starring: Terry "Hulk Hogan" Bollea; Linda Hogan; Brooke Hogan; Nick Hogan
- Country of origin: United States
- No. of seasons: 4
- No. of episodes: 43

Production
- Executive producers: Brad Abramson; Kimberly Belcher Cowin; Michael Hirschorn; Shelly Tatro
- Producer: John Ehrhard
- Production location: Florida
- Running time: 20 to 23 minutes (excluding commercials)
- Production company: Pink Sneakers Productions

Original release
- Network: VH1
- Release: July 10, 2005 – October 21, 2007

Related
- Brooke Knows Best

Hogan Knows Best is an American reality documentary television series on VH1. The series debuted on July 10, 2005, and centered on the family life of professional wrestler Hulk Hogan (Terry Bollea). Often focusing on the Hogans' raising of their children, and on Hulk Hogan's attempts to manage and assist in his children's burgeoning careers, the title of the show is a spoof of the 1950s television series, Father Knows Best.

After the cancellation of Hogan Knows Best in 2007, a spin-off entitled Brooke Knows Best debuted in 2008, and ran for two seasons.

== Cast ==
- Terry "Hulk Hogan" Bollea is represented on the show as a protective and somewhat strict father, particularly with regard to the opposite sex being anywhere near his daughter, Brooke. On more than one occasion, he has schemed ways to spy on her when hanging out with guys. However, because of a competition involving finding the right boyfriend for Brooke, Terry wanted to win so badly that he actually encouraged Brooke to be together with the young man he chose for her. The young man was Davey Boy Smith's son, Harry Smith. His career as a wrestler has taken its toll on his body, including weak knees and an artificial hip replacement, though he still works out in order to maintain his physique. He has also claimed, on the show, that he had his teeth knocked out six times and his nose broken twelve times. In an effort to conceal his baldness, he usually wears a bandana or occasionally a hat. Hulk Hogan died on July 24, 2025, aged 71.
- Linda Hogan is Hogan's wife. An ardent animal lover, she temporarily took a baby chimpanzee into the house in one episode, and seriously considered adopting it. Between her and Hulk, she is the more lenient parent. She has serious reservations about Hulk returning to the ring, and about her son contemplating a wrestling career.
- Brooke Hogan is Hulk and Linda's teenage daughter, who produced a new song to kick off her career, and signed a $1.3 million contract when she turned eighteen. Hulk's nickname for her is "Brooke-tini." On the show, she made crude remarks about Harry Smith's appearance and the two never hit it off.
- Nick Hogan is Hulk and Linda's son, who is two years younger than Brooke. Nick is always up to antics. Although Nick and Brooke have an amicable relationship overall, there are moments when they take pleasure in getting one another in trouble. Nick aspires to be a professional wrestler, though his father has encouraged him to take acting lessons in order to improve his sense of showmanship. Nick was a professional drifter for Dodge until July 2007. He got his Formula-D license in 2006.
- Brian Knobbs is Hulk's longtime friend and former wrestler, half of the Tag team The Nasty Boys. Knobbs often comes to stay with the family, much to Linda's dismay. He also comes to babysit Nick and Brooke when Hulk and Linda go on romantic trips. Brooke and Nick refer to him as "Uncle Knobs." He is often seen being joking and sarcastic.

== Production history ==
The series premiered on July 10, 2005, with a 1.9 (cable Nielsen rating), representing the largest audience for a VH1 premiere ever at that time. It began airing on CMT in early 2006 and also aired on Viva, MTV and Bio. in the UK and Ireland, TVtropolis in Canada, MusiquePlus in Quebec (in Quebec French, the show was called Hogan a raison, "Hogan is right"), Both VH1 (Seasons 1 - 3) and MTV (Season 4) in Australia, MTV Italia in Italy (in English with Italian subtitles), MTV Central in Germany and Austria (in English with German subtitles), VH1, MTV Portugal in Portugal (in English with Portuguese subtitles), in The Netherlands on MTV Netherlands with Dutch subtitles and in India on VH1, in France on Game one (le monde merveilleux de Hulk Hogan, "The Wonderful World of Hulk Hogan"), C4 and The Box in New Zealand. in Norway both on MTV Norway and VH1 with Norwegian subtitles, in Latin America with Spanish subtitles on VH1 (in Spanish, the show is Papá Hogan a la Lucha!) and in Brazil with Portuguese subtitles on VH1 (the show is called Papai Hogan Sabe Tudo or "'Daddy Hogan Knows All'"). In Finland with Finnish subtitles on Sub and MTV Finland (the show is called Hurjat Hoganit, Furious Hogans).

The show was originally pitched and offered to Hulk Hogan prior to his famous WrestleMania X8 "Icon vs. Icon" match with The Rock in 2002. It chronicled Hogan's return to the World Wrestling Entertainment after the demise of the World Championship Wrestling and surgery on both of his knees. Hogan declined. However, after later noticing the success of pop stars such as Hilary Duff and Britney Spears, Hogan accepted a deal to do the show as a way to help promote daughter Brooke's singing career. In the episode "Hulkamania Forever", Hulk also mentions that the family has no source of income as lawyer and music studio bills in excess of $200,000 had come in recently.

=== Filming ===
Hogan explains in his 2009 autobiography My Life Outside the Ring, that paying unionized camera crews to film subjects continuously until something telegenic or dramatic occurs would be prohibitively expensive, and that as a result, shows such as Hogan Knows Best are "soft-scripted", and follow a tightly regimented shooting schedule that allows for typical work-related considerations such as lunch breaks. When filming soft-scripted shows, the subjects are given a scenario by the producers to act out, perhaps an exaggerated version of something likely to be encountered in their real lives, are informed of the outcome, and possible "beats" in between, and instructed to improvise, which Hogan says is a version of what he did as a professional wrestler. According to Hogan, this would result in behavior that members of his family would never exhibit in real life, as when his son Nick tossed water balloons at neighbors from a window, or when his wife would wake up early to apply makeup and do her hair before camera crews arrived to film shots of the couple sleeping.

=== Cancellation ===
It was reported that taping for an additional season of Hogan Knows Best halted in the summer of 2007, before it was finally determined that the show was canceled in early 2008 due to problems involving Nick, Linda, and Terry Bollea.

On August 26, 2007, Nick was involved in a car crash while speeding in his Toyota Supra in Clearwater. Nick was sent to the hospital and released the following morning. However, his friend was seriously injured as a result of the car accident. Nick was charged with a felony for reckless driving and underage drinking, as well as violating limits on blood alcohol levels while driving. He was arrested on November 7, 2007, and sent to jail. However, his parents released him on a $10,000 bond shortly thereafter. As of 2022, Nick's friend, active-duty Marine John Graziano — who was 22 years old at the time of the crash — is on life support with serious brain injuries. It is now expected that he will require lifelong care, requiring him to spend the remainder of his life in a nursing home. The Hogan family issued a statement on how they were saddened that criminal charges had been filed against Nick, and how John was not wearing his seatbelt, but that Nick was. On May 9, 2008, Bollea entered a no contest plea and was sentenced to eight months in Pinellas County Jail.

It was also in 2007, while the Hogan family was shooting Hogan Knows Best, that Hulk allegedly cheated on Linda Claridge with a female friend of his daughter's, Christiane Plante. Plante, who confessed to an affair with Hulk Hogan, worked with Brooke Hogan on her 2006 album. Plante, 21 years younger than Hulk Hogan, claimed: "My relationship with Terry began at a time when Terry and Linda privately knew their marriage was ending. She had already left him, although no official papers had been filed. Terry is a good man, a good father, and a good friend, and he and I grew close during a very difficult period for him. It seemed right then, but I know it was wrong. Having felt the guilt and pain build up, I gave Brooke a note apologizing for my actions. I will never be able to fully forgive myself for this. I have lost an amazing friend."

On November 24, 2007, it was announced that Linda filed for divorce from Hulk Hogan after 24 years of marriage. Hogan was unaware of this until a reporter showed him the paperwork his wife had submitted. Linda had been away from him for three weeks in California when she submitted the paperwork. In court papers, Linda states the marriage is "irretrievably broken." In the court papers, she also addresses custody of their son, Nick, asking for primary physical custody, while Hulk would receive "liberal visitation and access to the child." Linda is reportedly seeking half of the couple's $9.5m in assets, including a stake in their Belleair mansion in Florida. In addition, Linda also asks for alimony, child support, and Hulk to pay for Nick's health insurance and take out a life insurance policy to cover child support for Nick if necessary.

After filing for divorce in November 2007, Linda (48 at the time) began dating Charlie Hill (19 at the time) in December 2007. Hill was a student at Brooke and Nick's high school, one grade above Nick and one grade below Brooke. In November 2008, Linda revealed to the public that she made the decision to end her marriage after finding out about Hulk Hogan's alleged affair.

Due to the accident and legal issues surrounding Nick and the divorce between Linda and Terry, the show was canceled. After the show's cancellation, a spin-off came out entitled Brooke Knows Best which focuses on Brooke Hogan independent from her parents, living with two roommates. The spin-off was cancelled the following year, after surviving only two seasons.

== Episodes ==
=== Series overview ===
Season	Episodes	Originally released	
Season	Episodes	First released	Last released
1	7	July 10, 2005	September 4, 2005
2	13	March 19, 2006	June 25, 2006
3	12	October 22, 2006	February 25, 2007
4	11	July 22, 2007	October 21, 2007

=== Season 1 (2005) ===
No. overall	No. in season	Title	Original release date
1	1	"Brooke's First Date"	July 10, 2005
2	2	"Nick's Girlfriend"	July 17, 2005
3	3	"Brooke's Big Break"	July 24, 2005
4	4	"WrestleMania"	July 31, 2005
5	5	"Romantic Getaway"	August 14, 2005
6	6	"Hogans vs. City Hall"	August 21, 2005
7	7	"Hulk's Hobbies"	September 4, 2005

=== Season 2 (2006) ===
No. overall	No. in season	Title	Original release date
8	1	"Brooke Breaks Away"	March 19, 2006
9	2	"Kids Get a Reality Check"	March 26, 2006
10	3	"Family Vacation"	April 2, 2006
11	4	"Nick Gets the Bug"	April 9, 2006
12	5	"Hogans Go Hollywood"	April 16, 2006
13	6	"Anniversary Surprise"	April 23, 2006
14	7	"The Hogan Boyfriend Test"	April 30, 2006
15	8	"Twilight of a God"	May 7, 2006
16	9	"Rent-a-Guru"	May 21, 2006
17	10	"Monkey Business"	May 28, 2006
18	11	"Nick's Growing Pains"	June 4, 2006
19	12	"Brooke Signs a Record Deal"	June 11, 2006
20	13	"Brooke's Video Dreams"	June 25, 2006

=== Season 3 (2006–2007) ===
No. overall	No. in season	Title	Original release date
21	1	"The Big Move"	October 22, 2006
22	2	"Hogans on the High Seas"	October 29, 2006
23	3	"Brooke Faces the Music"	November 5, 2006
24	4	"Koshermania"	November 12, 2006
25	5	"Brooke's Dating Game"	November 19, 2006
26	6	"Superfan"	January 7, 2007
27	7	"Que Vas Hacer, Hermano"	January 14, 2007
28	8	"Brooke Bares All"	January 21, 2007
29	9	"Nick in the Driver's Seat"	January 28, 2007
30	10	"Knobbs Invades"	February 11, 2007
31	11	"Hulkamania Forever"	February 11, 2007
32	12	"The Canine Mutiny"	February 25, 2007

=== Season 4 (2007) ===
No. overall	No. in season	Title	Original release date
33	1	"Wedlock Headlock"	July 22, 2007
34	2	"Brooke's Bodyguard"	July 29, 2007
35	3	"Hulk's Extreme Makeover"	August 5, 2007
36	4	"Keeping Up with Nick"	August 12, 2007
37	5	"Hogan Knows Workouts"	August 19, 2007
38	6	"Brooke's Older Boyfriend"	August 26, 2007
39	7	"Hogans Go West"	September 2, 2007
40	8	"Birds and the Bees"	September 6, 2007
41	9	"Hogans in Disguise"	September 23, 2007
42	10	"Brooke Breaks the Bank"	October 14, 2007
43	11	"Father of the Year"	October 21, 2007

== Reception ==
Jill Murphy from Common Sense Media gave the show 3 out of 5 stars.

== DVD release ==
Hogan Knows Best Seasons 1, 2, & 3 were released on DVD on September 25, 2007, exclusively at Suncoast and FYE. Hogan Knows Best Season 1 was released on DVD regions 2 and 4 in early 2008. Known release countries are Germany, Norway and Australia. Hogan Knows Best Season 2 was released on region 4 DVD by Magna Pacific in May 2010.

== See also ==
- The Osbournes (2002)
- Gene Simmons Family Jewels (2006)
- Rock of Love with Bret Michaels (2007)
