= Linda Hogan (TV personality) =

American television personality (born 1959)

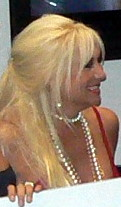
- Hogan in 2007
- Born: Linda Marie Claridge; August 24, 1959 (age 67); Los Angeles, California, U.S.
- Occupation: Television personality
- Years active: 1978–present
- Television: Hogan Knows Best (2005–2007)
- Spouse: Hulk Hogan (m. 1983; div. 2009)
- Partner: Charley Hill (2008–2012)
- Children: Brooke Hogan; Nick Hogan

Linda Marie Claridge (born August 24, 1959), also known as Linda Hogan, is an American television personality who was the first wife of professional wrestler Hulk Hogan. She is best known for her role on the American reality television show Hogan Knows Best.

== Early years ==
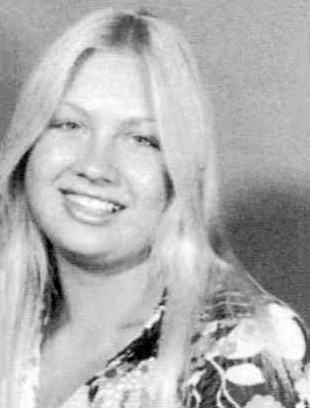
Claridge in 1976

Claridge was raised Catholic and is of British and Irish descent. She is the older sister of actress Christie Claridge. In 1977, she graduated from Chatsworth High School in California. She was a winning contestant on Match Game in 1978.

== Career ==
In 1995, Claridge appeared on Hulk Hogan's album Hulk Rules, where she sang back-up vocals along with The Wrestling Boot Band. Claridge entered the spotlight in 2005 as "Linda Hogan", due to the VH1 reality show Hogan Knows Best. A 2005 documentary DVD on street racers, called Vehicular Lunatics, includes a segment with Claridge. Claridge wrote a book, Wrestling the Hulk: My Life Against the Ropes, which was published in 2011. She appeared on the Season 3, episode 8 of Bar Rescue.

== Personal life ==
Claridge met Terry Bollea, known professionally as Hulk Hogan, in a restaurant in Los Angeles. For nearly two years, the couple had a long-distance relationship mostly over the telephone. They married in 1983 in a wedding attended by André the Giant, Vince McMahon, and other wrestling personalities. They have two children together, Brooke (1988) and Nick (1990). Claridge filed for divorce from Bollea on November 20, 2007. The divorce was finalized on July 28, 2009.

Claridge received media attention when she began dating Charlie Hill in 2008, when she was 48 and Hill was 19. Hill proposed to her on an episode of the VH1 reality television show Couples Therapy in 2012; the couple split up later that year.

In October 2012, Claridge was arrested in Malibu, California, for driving under the influence, with an alcohol level of 0.084. She pleaded guilty to DUI. She was released several hours later after posting bail.

She has had a strained relationship with her daughter, Brooke.

Claridge would pay tribute to her ex-husband following his death on July 24, 2025, writing on Instagram that his death came as a "big surprise" and that she had been hit "so hard" by the news, as well as reminiscing about their 26-year marriage. On August 5, 2025, Claridge attended her ex-husband's funeral service.
