= SoBe Entertainment =

Entertainment company

SoBe Entertainment International, LLC.
- Company type: Records & Films
- Industry: Music & Entertainment
- Genre: various
- Founded: 2003
- Headquarters: Miami Beach, FL, USA
- Key people: Cecile Barker CEO & Chairman; Yannique Barker President
- Products: Music & Films & Entertainment
- Website: SoBe Entertainment

SoBe Entertainment, LLC is an international entertainment parent company founded by Cecile D. Barker with music, film, TV, night club, management and digital subsidiaries.

The record label is a subsidiary of Fontana Distribution and Universal Music Group and has signed several recording artists who perform in the R&B, Hip Hop, Rap, Pop, Rock and Reggae genres. The company's corporate offices are based in South Beach, Miami, Florida.

The night club, SoBe Live, is located on Washington Avenue in South Beach and has been voted # 1 in the country by VH-1. Monika Olimpiew is the President and GM of SoBe Live.

SoBe Films is located on Lincoln Road in South Beach. The film company produces reality TV shows, short story films, documentaries, music videos and full-length movies for theaters. Yannique Barker is the CEO of the film and TV company.

SoBe Entertainment's recording artists include Jah Cure, Stack$, LP, The New Rivals, Brooke Hogan, Urban Mystic, and Phyllisia.

== Present Artists ==
- Brooke Hogan (2006–2011; 2025-Present)
- Ja'Rae
- Ce'Cile
- Ragga Bear
- J N A

== Former Artists ==
- 4MULA 1 (2003–2008)
- Phyllisia (2007-2012)
- Jah Cure (2007-2012)
- Lola (2005-2010)
- LP (2007-2010)
- Urban Mystic (2004-2017)
