= Bad (tour) =

1987–1989 concert tour by Michael Jackson

- World tour by Michael Jackson
- Promotional logo for the tour
- Location: Asia; Europe; North America; Oceania
- Associated album: Bad
- Start date: September 12, 1987
- End date: January 27, 1989
- Legs: 7
- No. of shows: 123
- Attendance: 4.4 million
- Box office: US$125 million ($324.66 million in 2025 dollars)

Michael Jackson concert chronology
- Victory Tour (1984); Bad (1987–1989); Dangerous World Tour (1992–1993)

Bad was the first solo concert tour by the American singer Michael Jackson, launched in support of his seventh album, Bad (1987). The 123-show world tour began on September 12, 1987, in Japan, and concluded on January 27, 1989, in the United States, sponsored by soft drink manufacturer Pepsi.

The tour was recognized three times by the Guinness World Records for sales and attendance. It grossed a total of $125 million, making it the second highest-grossing tour of the 1980s. It was Jackson's only solo tour of the US, with the subsequent Dangerous and HIStory world tours being almost exclusively non-domestic.

== Background ==
On June 29, 1987, Jackson's manager, Frank DiLeo, held a press conference in Tokyo to announce that Jackson would embark on his first concert tour as a solo artist. It marked his first concerts since the Victory Tour in 1984 which he performed with his brothers as the Jacksons. DiLeo said the tour would start with a Japanese leg because of the country's loyal fans. In a written statement, Jackson, who was completing Bad in Los Angeles, promised "thrilling and exciting" concerts. The soft drink manufacturer Pepsi, with whom Jackson and his brothers had a deal worth an estimated $5 million per year, sponsored the tour. Sales of the drink in Japan doubled during the summer following the announcement, helped by an advertising campaign that offered free tickets and 30,000 souvenirs. The entire entourage were instructed not to be seen drinking a product from rival Coca-Cola in public. Marlon Brando's son Miko joined the tour as a production assistant.

Auditions for Jackson's backing band, and subsequent rehearsals, were held at the Leeds facility in North Hollywood. Keyboardist Rory Kaplan, who had played on the Victory Tour, was touring with the Chick Corea Elektric Band when he was asked by Jackson's secretary to join his group as musical director, which Kaplan accepted. Jackson intended to include two more musicians who had been part of the Victory Tour band, drummer Jonathan Moffett and guitarist David Williams. However, both were on tour with Madonna at the time and thus unavailable. Jackson wanted the music on stage to sound like the original recordings, and asked Chris Currell, who had played the Synclavier synthesizer/sampler on Bad, to play it live. Currell arranged to have three complete systems: two to handle the music on stage and one for his hotel room for Jackson to record ideas while traveling, plus a dismantled setup for spare parts in case of a problem, and a full time technician. Currell estimated the Synclaviers alone cost $1.4 million. Since he was primarily a guitarist and not a keyboardist, he purchased a SynthAxe MIDI controller guitar to trigger cues to a computer which operated the Synclavier. The audition performances were filmed and played to Jackson at his home in the evening. The band had just two weeks to rehearse at Leeds before production rehearsals followed at Universal Studios for another three, although no full production in its entirety happened until the first show.

== Overview ==
=== Japan and Australia (1987) ===
The tour began with a 14-date leg across Japan, marking Jackson's first performances in the country since 1973 as part of the Jackson 5. Nine shows were originally announced but they sold out within hours, so five more were added due to the high demand. The shows cost the sponsors $8.6 million to stage. Jackson arrived at Tokyo's Narita International Airport on September 9, where over 300 reporters and photographers greeted him upon his arrival. The staging, lighting, and musical equipment for the 1987 dates weighed 110,000 lbs. Jackson assisted in the stage design, which consisted of 700 lights, 100 speakers, 40 lasers, three mirrors, and two 24-by-18 foot screens. Performers wore 70 costumes, four of which were attached with fiber optic lights.

While in Osaka, Jackson received the key to the city by the mayor. In Tokyo, Jackson donated $20,000 to the parents of Yoshiaki Hagiwara, a five-year-old boy who was kidnapped and murdered, after he watched a news report about the tragedy. Attendance figures for the first 14 dates in Japan totaled a record-breaking 570,000. Crowds of 200,000 were what past performers could manage to draw for a single tour. Some shows were filmed by Nippon TV and the September 26 show in Yokohama was broadcast on Japanese television. Jackson wrapped the Japanese leg by donating several personalised items for a charity auction, including clothes and glasses worn during the tour.

Jackson left Japan for a rest period in Hong Kong and China before the Australian leg. On October 30, a planned New Zealand leg was cancelled as local promoters were unable to meet demands that the audience be seated, although dates there and Australia were also cancelled due to low ticket sales. Between November 13 and 28, Jackson performed five concerts in Melbourne, Sydney, and Brisbane. The loud and enthusiastic crowds were a contrast to the Japanese audience, who were instructed to remain quiet and make little noise, and made it difficult for the group to hear the count-ins at the beginning of a number. The November 28 show in Brisbane was recorded and broadcast. During the concert, Jackson brought Stevie Wonder on stage to sing "Bad" with him.

=== North America (1988) ===
Promotional poster for the tour

Following the 1987 dates Jackson wanted to revamp the production with a larger stage set-up, the addition of new numbers including "Smooth Criminal" and "Man in the Mirror", and new musical arrangements. Kaplan revisited the studio recordings and prepared tapes for each band member to follow. During this time Phillinganes took over as musical director and Kaplan became technical director. Rehearsals for the new set-up took place at the Pensacola Civic Center in Florida from January 22 to February 18, 1988. Vincent Paterson, who had worked with Jackson on several videos, was brought in to choreograph and co-direct the tour. On the final day, Jackson allowed 420 school pupils to watch him perform a full dress rehearsal after the children made him a rap music video in his honor. The band rehearsed "Speed Demon" from Bad prior to Jackson's arrival two weeks in, and he liked the performance, but it was dropped from the set as he had no choreography to accompany the song. Siegfried and Roy were brought in to advise on some stage illusions.

The first performances were to begin in Atlanta, but Pepsi officials objected the plan as it was home to Coca-Cola. For both Atlanta shows, Jackson gave 100 tickets to the Children's Wish Foundation for terminally ill children to attend. The first of three concerts at Madison Square Garden in New York City in March served as a benefit to raise $500,000 to the United Negro College Fund. Jackson presented a check of $600,000 to the fund. He performed "The Way You Make Me Feel" and "Man in the Mirror" during the 30th anniversary of the Grammy Awards on March 2.

=== Europe (1988) ===
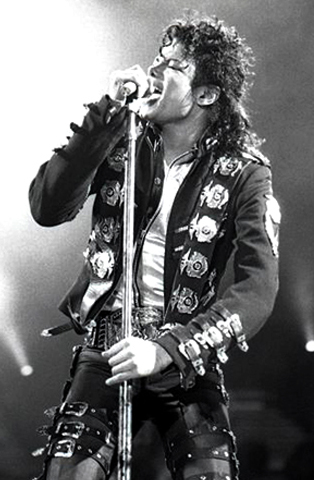
Jackson performing in Vienna on June 2, 1988

The European leg began in Rome on May 23, where police and security guards rescued hundreds of fans from being crushed in the crowd of 35,000. Police reported 130 women had fainted at the concert in Vienna. While in Switzerland, Jackson went to Vevey to meet Oona O'Neill, the widow of actor Charlie Chaplin. On June 19, Jackson performed in West Berlin close to the Berlin Wall in front of the Reichstag Building. After Jackson's death it was revealed that the Stasi had kept a file on him, making extensive preparations to prevent East German fans to gather at the Brandenburg Gate to listen to the concert. The plan also involved broadcasting the concert in a stadium in East Berlin with a two-minute delay, so the East Germans could replace the live performance with a videotape of a previous performance in case Jackson made any undesirable political comments.

The most successful of the European dates were those in London at Wembley Stadium, where demand for the five July dates exceeded 1.5 million, enough to fill the 72,000-capacity venue 20 times. Jackson went on to perform seven sold-out shows at Wembley for a total of 504,000 people which entered him into the Guinness World Records, the first of three times from the tour alone. The record surpassed the previous attendance record shared by Madonna, Bruce Springsteen, and Genesis. More shows could have been added, but the venue had reached its quota for live performances. The third concert was attended by Diana, Princess of Wales and Prince Charles, and subsequently released as Live at Wembley July 16, 1988. On July 30, NBC aired Michael Jackson Around the World, a 90-minute special documenting the singer on tour. On August 29, after a birthday performance in Leeds, Jackson donated $130,000 to Give for Life. The final European show was held in Liverpool at Aintree Racecourse, where 1,550 fans were reported injured among the crowd of 125,000, the largest show of the tour.

=== North America and Japan (1988–1989) ===
Jackson toured the United States for a second time between September 1988 and January 1989, with a return to Tokyo for nine shows in December which included a concert on Christmas Day. This would be the last time he toured his native country, aside from two shows in Hawaii in 1997 and a handful of one-off appearances in 2001 and 2002. On October 23, 1988, he donated $125,000, the net proceeds of the first show in Auburn Hills, to the city's Motown Museum. This second American tour alone grossed a total of $20.3 million, the sixth largest of the year. The tour was planned to end in Tokyo, but Jackson suffered from swollen vocal cords after the first of six concerts in Los Angeles in November, and the remaining five were rescheduled for January 1989. Due to this rescheduling, Phillinganes had to disembark from the tour in early January, having already made commitments to tour with Eric Clapton. Studio musician John Barnes was hired to take Phillinganes' place.

During the run of shows in Tokyo, nine-year-old Ayana Takada was selected to receive a certificate by Jackson to commemorate the four millionth person to attend the tour.

Five performances in Los Angeles were held to conclude the tour on January 27, 1989. Currell remembered a minor earthquake shook the stage as the band were taking their final bow at the end of the final show. In 16 months, Jackson performed 123 concerts in 15 countries to an audience of 4.5 million for a total gross of $125 million. The American tour alone grossed a total of $20.3 million, the sixth largest of the year. Guinness World Records recognized the tour as the largest grossing in history and the tour to play to the most people ever. In April 1989, the tour was nominated for "Tour of the Year 1988" at the inaugural International Rock Awards, but it lost to Amnesty International. It was the second highest-grossing tour of the 1980s after Pink Floyd's Momentary Lapse of Reason tour.

The tour ended up being Jackson's only tour of the US as a solo artist. It was followed by the Dangerous World Tour (1992–1993) and the HIStory World Tour (1996–1997), of which only the latter featured two US shows, in Hawaii.

== Concert DVD and other recordings ==
A live album and DVD of the July 16, 1988, concert in London titled Live at Wembley July 16, 1988 was released along with the special edition reissue of the Bad album titled Bad 25 on September 18, 2012, as well as a stand-alone DVD. Video of the September 26, 1987, Concert in Yokohama, Japan, was broadcast on Nippon Television and is available on YouTube. A number of amateur-shot concerts and short snippets were leaked on YouTube a few years later. Half-show footage of Rome (May 23, 1988) and Brisbane (November 28, 1987), and a high-quality 30-minute segment of live footage of Tokyo (December 9, 1988), as well as full low-quality leaks of Tokyo (September 12 & 13, 1987) and Osaka (October 10, 1987) are also available online. Audio recordings of the final Los Angeles (January 27, 1989) concert have been crowdfunded and released on YouTube. Audio recordings from the rehearsal at Pensacola, Florida (February 18, 1988) have also been released as well. Atlanta (April 13, 1988), Auburn Hills (October 24, 1988), Osaka (October 12, 1987), Tokyo (September 13, 1987), have been leaked.

== Opening acts ==
- Kim Wilde (Europe)
- Taylor Dayne (Europe – August 5–23, 1988)
- Gianna Nannini (Gelsenkirchen)

== Set lists ==
=== 1987 ===
The following set list was performed during the first leg of the tour, but is not intended to represent the majority of performances.

1. "Wanna Be Startin' Somethin'"
2. "Things I Do for You"
3. "Off the Wall"
4. "Human Nature"
5. "Heartbreak Hotel"
6. "She's Out of My Life"
7. "Jackson 5 Medley": "I Want You Back" / "The Love You Save" / "I'll Be There"
8. "Rock with You"
9. "Lovely One"
10. "Working Day and Night"
11. "Beat It"
12. "Billie Jean"
13. "Shake Your Body (Down to the Ground)"
14. "Thriller"
15. "I Just Can't Stop Loving You"
16. "Bad"

=== 1988–1989 ===
The following set list was performed during the second leg of the tour, but is not intended to represent the majority of performances.

1. "Wanna Be Startin' Somethin'"
2. "Heartbreak Hotel"
3. "Another Part of Me"
4. "Human Nature"
5. "Smooth Criminal"
6. "I Just Can't Stop Loving You"
7. "She's Out of My Life"
8. "Jackson 5 Medley": "I Want You Back" / "The Love You Save" / "I'll Be There"
9. "Rock with You"
10. "Dirty Diana"
11. "Thriller"
12. "Working Day and Night"
13. "Beat It"
14. "Billie Jean"
15. "Bad"
16. "The Way You Make Me Feel"
17. "Man in the Mirror"

== Tour dates ==
List of 1987 concerts, showing date, city, country, venue, tickets sold, number of available tickets and amount of gross revenue
Date	City	Country	Venue	Attendance	Revenue
September 12, 1987	Tokyo	Japan	Korakuen Stadium	135,000 / 135,000	$52,423,603
September 13, 1987	Tokyo	Japan	Korakuen Stadium	135,000 / 135,000	$52,423,603
September 14, 1987	Tokyo	Japan	Korakuen Stadium	135,000 / 135,000	$52,423,603
September 19, 1987	Nishinomiya	Japan	Hankyu Nishinomiya Stadium	120,000 / 120,000	$52,423,603
September 20, 1987	Nishinomiya	Japan	Hankyu Nishinomiya Stadium	120,000 / 120,000	$52,423,603
September 21, 1987	Nishinomiya	Japan	Hankyu Nishinomiya Stadium	120,000 / 120,000	$52,423,603
September 25, 1987	Yokohama	Japan	Yokohama Stadium	240,000 / 240,000	$52,423,603
September 26, 1987	Yokohama	Japan	Yokohama Stadium	240,000 / 240,000	$52,423,603
September 27, 1987	Yokohama	Japan	Yokohama Stadium	240,000 / 240,000	$52,423,603
October 3, 1987	Yokohama	Japan	Yokohama Stadium	240,000 / 240,000	$52,423,603
October 4, 1987	Yokohama	Japan	Yokohama Stadium	240,000 / 240,000	$52,423,603
October 10, 1987	Osaka	Japan	Osaka Stadium	120,000 / 120,000	$52,423,603
October 11, 1987	Osaka	Japan	Osaka Stadium	120,000 / 120,000	$52,423,603
October 12, 1987	Osaka	Japan	Osaka Stadium	120,000 / 120,000	$52,423,603
November 13, 1987	Melbourne	Australia	Olympic Park Stadium	45,000 / 45,000	—N/a
November 20, 1987	Sydney	Australia	Parramatta Stadium	90,000 / 90,000	—N/a
November 21, 1987	Sydney	Australia	Parramatta Stadium	90,000 / 90,000	—N/a
November 27, 1987	Brisbane	Australia	Brisbane Entertainment Centre	27,000 / 27,000	—N/a
November 28, 1987	Brisbane	Australia	Brisbane Entertainment Centre	27,000 / 27,000	—N/a

List of 1988 concerts, showing date, city, country, venue, tickets sold, number of available tickets and amount of gross revenue
Date	City	Country	Venue	Attendance	Revenue
February 23, 1988	Kansas City	United States	Kemper Arena	33,918 / 33,918	$642,091
February 24, 1988	Kansas City	United States	Kemper Arena	33,918 / 33,918	$642,091
March 3, 1988	New York City	United States	Madison Square Garden	57,000 / 57,000	$1,800,000
March 5, 1988	New York City	United States	Madison Square Garden	57,000 / 57,000	$1,800,000
March 6, 1988	New York City	United States	Madison Square Garden	57,000 / 57,000	$1,800,000
March 13, 1988	St. Louis	United States	St. Louis Arena	17,000 / 17,000	—N/a
March 18, 1988	Indianapolis	United States	Market Square Arena	34,000 / 34,000	—N/a
March 19, 1988	Indianapolis	United States	Market Square Arena	34,000 / 34,000	—N/a
March 20, 1988	Louisville	United States	Freedom Hall	19,000 / 19,000	—N/a
March 24, 1988	Denver	United States	McNichols Sports Arena	40,251 / 40,251	$842,918
March 25, 1988	Denver	United States	McNichols Sports Arena	40,251 / 40,251	$842,918
March 26, 1988	Denver	United States	McNichols Sports Arena	40,251 / 40,251	$842,918
March 30, 1988	Hartford	United States	Hartford Civic Center	45,188 / 45,188	$1,071,148
March 31, 1988	Hartford	United States	Hartford Civic Center	45,188 / 45,188	$1,071,148
April 1, 1988	Hartford	United States	Hartford Civic Center	45,188 / 45,188	$1,071,148
April 8, 1988	Houston	United States	The Summit	51,000 / 51,000	—N/a
April 9, 1988	Houston	United States	The Summit	51,000 / 51,000	—N/a
April 10, 1988	Houston	United States	The Summit	51,000 / 51,000	—N/a
April 13, 1988	Atlanta	United States	Omni Coliseum	51,000 / 51,000	—N/a
April 14, 1988	Atlanta	United States	Omni Coliseum	51,000 / 51,000	—N/a
April 15, 1988	Atlanta	United States	Omni Coliseum	51,000 / 51,000	—N/a
April 19, 1988	Rosemont	United States	Rosemont Horizon	40,000 / 40,000	—N/a
April 20, 1988	Rosemont	United States	Rosemont Horizon	40,000 / 40,000	—N/a
April 21, 1988	Rosemont	United States	Rosemont Horizon	40,000 / 40,000	—N/a
April 25, 1988	Dallas	United States	Reunion Arena	57,000 / 57,000	—N/a
April 26, 1988	Dallas	United States	Reunion Arena	57,000 / 57,000	—N/a
April 27, 1988	Dallas	United States	Reunion Arena	57,000 / 57,000	—N/a
May 4, 1988	Bloomington	United States	Met Center	50,662 / 50,662	$1,139,895
May 5, 1988	Bloomington	United States	Met Center	50,662 / 50,662	$1,139,895
May 6, 1988	Bloomington	United States	Met Center	50,662 / 50,662	$1,139,895
May 23, 1988	Rome	Italy	Stadio Flaminio	80,000 / 80,000	—N/a
May 24, 1988	Rome	Italy	Stadio Flaminio	80,000 / 80,000	—N/a
May 29, 1988	Turin	Italy	Stadio Comunale	60,000 / 60,000	—N/a
June 2, 1988	Vienna	Austria	Praterstadion	55,000 / 55,000	—N/a
June 5, 1988	Rotterdam	Netherlands	Stadion Feijenoord	145,200 / 145,200	—N/a
June 6, 1988	Rotterdam	Netherlands	Stadion Feijenoord	145,200 / 145,200	—N/a
June 7, 1988	Rotterdam	Netherlands	Stadion Feijenoord	145,200 / 145,200	—N/a
June 11, 1988	Gothenburg	Sweden	Eriksberg	106,000 / 106,000	—N/a
June 12, 1988	Gothenburg	Sweden	Eriksberg	106,000 / 106,000	—N/a
June 16, 1988	Basel	Switzerland	St. Jakob Stadium	50,000 / 50,000	—N/a
June 19, 1988	West Berlin	West Germany	Platz der Republik	43,000 / 43,000	—N/a
June 27, 1988	Paris	France	Parc des Princes	63,000 / 63,000	—N/a
June 28, 1988	Paris	France	Parc des Princes	63,000 / 63,000	—N/a
July 1, 1988	Hamburg	West Germany	Volksparkstadion	50,000 / 50,000	—N/a
July 3, 1988	Cologne	West Germany	Müngersdorfer Stadion	70,000 / 70,000	—N/a
July 8, 1988	Munich	West Germany	Olympiastadion	72,000 / 72,000	—N/a
July 10, 1988	Hockenheim	West Germany	Hockenheimring	80,000 / 80,000	—N/a
July 14, 1988	London	England	Wembley Stadium	504,000 / 504,000 (Note: Attendance combined with the attendance from July 14–16, and 22–23, and August 26–27, 1988.)	—N/a
July 15, 1988	London	England	Wembley Stadium	504,000 / 504,000	—N/a
July 16, 1988	London	England	Wembley Stadium	504,000 / 504,000	—N/a
July 22, 1988	London	England	Wembley Stadium	504,000 / 504,000	—N/a
July 23, 1988	London	England	Wembley Stadium	504,000 / 504,000	—N/a
July 26, 1988	Cardiff	Wales	Cardiff Arms Park	55,000 / 55,000	—N/a
July 30, 1988	Cork	Ireland	Páirc Uí Chaoimh	130,000 / 130,000	—N/a
July 31, 1988	Cork	Ireland	Páirc Uí Chaoimh	130,000 / 130,000	—N/a
August 5, 1988	Marbella	Spain	Estadio Municipal de Marbella	28,000 / 28,000	—N/a
August 7, 1988	Madrid	Spain	Vicente Calderón Stadium	60,000 / 60,000	—N/a
August 9, 1988	Barcelona	Spain	Camp Nou	95,000 / 95,000	—N/a
August 12, 1988	Montpellier	France	Stade Richter	35,000 / 35,000	—N/a
August 14, 1988	Nice	France	Stade Charles-Ehrmann	35,000 / 35,000	—N/a
August 19, 1988	Lausanne	Switzerland	Stade olympique de la Pontaise	45,000 / 45,000	—N/a
August 21, 1988	Würzburg	West Germany	Talavera Mainwiesen	43,000 / 43,000	—N/a
August 23, 1988	Werchter	Belgium	Werchter festival ground	55,000 / 55,000	—N/a
August 26, 1988	London	England	Wembley Stadium	—	—N/a
August 27, 1988	London	England	Wembley Stadium	—	—N/a
August 29, 1988	Leeds	England	Roundhay Park	90,000 / 90,000	—N/a
September 2, 1988	Hannover	West Germany	Niedersachsenstadion	40,000 / 40,000	—N/a
September 4, 1988	Gelsenkirchen	West Germany	Parkstadion	52,000 / 52,000	—N/a
September 6, 1988	Linz	Austria	Linzer Stadion	40,000 / 40,000	—N/a
September 10, 1988	Milton Keynes	England	Milton Keynes Bowl	60,000 / 60,000	—N/a
September 11, 1988	Liverpool	England	Aintree Racecourse	125,000 / 125,000	—N/a
September 26, 1988	Pittsburgh	United States	Civic Arena	48,694 / 48,694	$1,144,917
September 27, 1988	Pittsburgh	United States	Civic Arena	48,694 / 48,694	$1,144,917
September 28, 1988	Pittsburgh	United States	Civic Arena	48,694 / 48,694	$1,144,917
October 3, 1988	East Rutherford	United States	Brendan Byrne Arena	61,061 / 61,061	$1,600,755
October 4, 1988	East Rutherford	United States	Brendan Byrne Arena	61,061 / 61,061	$1,600,755
October 5, 1988	East Rutherford	United States	Brendan Byrne Arena	61,061 / 61,061	$1,600,755
October 10, 1988	Richfield	United States	Richfield Coliseum	38,000 / 38,000	—N/a
October 11, 1988	Richfield	United States	Richfield Coliseum	38,000 / 38,000	—N/a
October 13, 1988	Landover	United States	Capital Centre	69,883 / 69,883	$1,747,075
October 17, 1988	Landover	United States	Capital Centre	69,883 / 69,883	$1,747,075
October 18, 1988	Landover	United States	Capital Centre	69,883 / 69,883	$1,747,075
October 19, 1988	Landover	United States	Capital Centre	69,883 / 69,883	$1,747,075
October 24, 1988	Auburn Hills	United States	The Palace of Auburn Hills	50,010 / 50,010	—N/a
October 25, 1988	Auburn Hills	United States	The Palace of Auburn Hills	50,010 / 50,010	—N/a
October 26, 1988	Auburn Hills	United States	The Palace of Auburn Hills	50,010 / 50,010	—N/a
November 7, 1988	Irvine	United States	Irvine Meadows Amphitheatre	45,000 / 45,000	—N/a
November 8, 1988	Irvine	United States	Irvine Meadows Amphitheatre	45,000 / 45,000	—N/a
November 9, 1988	Irvine	United States	Irvine Meadows Amphitheatre	45,000 / 45,000	—N/a
November 13, 1988	Los Angeles	United States	Los Angeles Memorial Sports Arena	93,198 / 93,198 (Note: Boxscore combined with the boxscore from November 13, 1988, and January 16–18 and 26–27, 1989.)	$2,423,603
December 9, 1988	Tokyo	Japan	Tokyo Dome	450,000 / 450,000	—N/a
December 10, 1988	Tokyo	Japan	Tokyo Dome	450,000 / 450,000	—N/a
December 11, 1988	Tokyo	Japan	Tokyo Dome	450,000 / 450,000	—N/a
December 17, 1988	Tokyo	Japan	Tokyo Dome	450,000 / 450,000	—N/a
December 18, 1988	Tokyo	Japan	Tokyo Dome	450,000 / 450,000	—N/a
December 19, 1988	Tokyo	Japan	Tokyo Dome	450,000 / 450,000	—N/a
December 24, 1988	Tokyo	Japan	Tokyo Dome	450,000 / 450,000	—N/a
December 25, 1988	Tokyo	Japan	Tokyo Dome	450,000 / 450,000	—N/a
December 26, 1988	Tokyo	Japan	Tokyo Dome	450,000 / 450,000	—N/a

List of 1989 concerts, showing date, city, country, venue, tickets sold, number of available tickets and amount of gross revenue
Date	City	Country	Venue	Attendance	Revenue
January 16, 1989 (Note: Originally scheduled for November 14, 1988)	Los Angeles	United States	Los Angeles Memorial Sports Arena	—	—
January 17, 1989 (Note: Originally scheduled for November 15, 1988)	Los Angeles	United States	Los Angeles Memorial Sports Arena	—	—
January 18, 1989 (Note: Originally scheduled for November 20, 1988)	Los Angeles	United States	Los Angeles Memorial Sports Arena	—	—
January 26, 1989 (Note: Originally scheduled for November 21, 1988)	Los Angeles	United States	Los Angeles Memorial Sports Arena	—	—
January 27, 1989 (Note: Originally scheduled for November 22, 1988)	Los Angeles	United States	Los Angeles Memorial Sports Arena	—	—
Total				4,559,065 / 4,559,065 (100%)	$63,212,402

=== Cancelled dates ===
List of cancelled concerts, showing date, city, country, venue, and reason for cancellation
Date	City	Country	Venue	Reason
October 17, 1987	Hong Kong		Hong Kong Coliseum	Cancelled for unknown reasons
October 18, 1987	Hong Kong		Hong Kong Coliseum	Cancelled for unknown reasons
November 3, 1987	Perth	Australia	WACA Ground	Cancelled for unknown reasons
November 8, 1987	Adelaide	Australia	Thebarton Oval	Cancelled for unknown reasons
December 2, 1987	Wellington	New Zealand	Athletic Park	Cancelled for unknown reasons
December 6, 1987	Auckland	New Zealand	Mount Smart Stadium	Cancelled for unknown reasons
March 14, 1988	St. Louis	United States	St. Louis Arena	Laryngitis
April 1, 1988	Cincinnati	United States	Riverfront Coliseum	Tour restructuring (Note: There were also initial plans to take the tour to Birmingham, Alabama, and Chapel Hill, North Carolina.)
April 2, 1988	Cincinnati	United States	Riverfront Coliseum	Tour restructuring
May 31, 1988	Milan	Italy	San Siro	Tour restructuring (Note: Jackson was initially planned to do 2 concerts in Milan between late May and early June, but the San Siro stadium was unusable due to renovations.)
June 1, 1988	Milan	Italy	San Siro	Tour restructuring
June 23, 1988	Lyon	France	Stade de Gerland	Low ticket sales
October 31, 1988	Tacoma	United States	Tacoma Dome	Laryngitis
November 1, 1988	Tacoma	United States	Tacoma Dome	Laryngitis
November 2, 1988	Tacoma	United States	Tacoma Dome	Laryngitis

== Personnel ==
=== Band ===
- Michael Jackson – co-director, co-choreographer, lead vocals, dancing
- Greg Phillinganes – musical director, keyboards (1987–1988)
- Rory Kaplan – keyboards
- Christopher Currell – Synclavier synthesizers, digital guitar, sound effects
- Ricky Lawson – drums, percussion
- Jennifer Batten – rhythm and lead guitar
- Jon Clark – lead and rhythm guitar
- Don Boyette – bass guitar, synth bass

=== Vocals ===
- Darryl Phinnessee – backing vocals
- Sheryl Crow – backing vocals
- Dorian Holley – backing vocals
- Kevin Dorsey – vocal music director, backing vocals

=== Dancers ===
- Randy Allaire
- Evaldo "Eddie" Garcia
- Dominic Lucero
- LaVelle Smith Jr.

=== Wardrobe and crew ===
- Karen Faye – hair and makeup
- Tommy Simms – stylist
- Bill Frank Whitten – costume design
- Dennis Tompkins – costume design
- Michael Bush – costume design
- Jolie Levine – Jackson's personal assistant
- Meredith Besser – assistant

=== Production and management ===
- Juan C. Marin – assistant director
- Vincent Paterson – co-director, choreographer
- Tom McPhillips – set designer
- Allen Branton – lighting designer
- Frank DiLeo – Jackson's manager
- Sal Bonafede – tour co-ordinator
- John Draper – tour manager
- Benny Collins – production manager
- Nelson Hayes – production co-ordinator
- Rob Henry – production co-ordinator
- Gerry Bakalian – stage manager
- Tait Towers, Inc. – set construction
- Clair Bros. – sound
- Kevin Elison – house sound engineer
- Rick Coberly – monitor engineer
- Ziffren, Brittenham and Branca – attorneys
- Gelfand, Rennert and Feldman – business management
- Solters/Roskin, Friedman Inc. – public relations
- Bob Jones – VP of communications
- Glen Brunman – media relations
- Michael Mitchell – tour publicist
- Gretta Walsh of Revel Travel – travel agent
- Patrick "Bubba" Morrow – Nocturne Video
- Mo Morrison – production team

== See also ==
- List of highest-grossing concert tours
- List of most-attended concert tours
- List of most-attended ticketed multi-night concerts
