= Live at Wembley July 16, 1988 =

Video by Michael Jackson
- Released: September 18, 2012
- Recorded: July 16, 1988
- Venue: Wembley Stadium (London)
- Genre: Pop; rock; soul
- Length: 1:58:15
- Label: Epic; Legacy; Sony; Optimum Productions

Michael Jackson chronology
Michael Jackson's Vision (2010)	Live at Wembley July 16, 1988 (2012)	-

Live at Wembley July 16, 1988 is a live concert DVD by American recording artist Michael Jackson released on September 18, 2012. It was included with the Bad 25 reissue, as well as by itself. This is the third Jackson tour stop released on home video (after the DVD Live in Bucharest: The Dangerous Tour and the VHS HIStory World Tour: Live in Seoul (Note: The music video for the song "Another Part of Me" features footage from other concerts in Wembley as well as Paris.)). The recording is a performance of the Bad World Tour, which took place from 1987–1989.

This particular concert took place on July 16, 1988, at Wembley Stadium in Wembley, London, to a sold-out crowd of 72,000, which included Diana, Princess of Wales and Charles, Prince of Wales. Jackson originally removed "Dirty Diana" from this night's performance, worried that he would offend Princess Diana or the royal family. However, the princess informed Jackson it was her favorite song. In an interview (Michael Jackson's Private Home Movies), Jackson stated that he was unable to put the song into the set, which led some fans to believe "Dirty Diana" was not performed on July 16. However, leaked audio snippets prove that the song was re-added to the setlist.

The DVD also includes "The Way You Make Me Feel", from July 14 (The audio for this bonus is from July 15, the song was not performed on July 16 due to a late start of the show) and "I Just Can't Stop Loving You", and "Bad", performed on September 26, 1987, in Yokohama, Japan. The Bad 25 deluxe package also contains a CD of the audio from the July 16 concert as well, with audio edited down to 80 minutes from the original two hours.

== Audio/video controversy ==
According to the official Bad 25 statement released by the Estate of Michael Jackson, the video is sourced from Jackson's personal VHS copy of the show, the only known copy in existence. The audio, however, has been sourced by a high-quality multitrack recording, snippets of which have leaked online in mid-2011 to positive fan reception; some of this is from the July 15 show. These concerts are the only known multitrack audio recordings of the Bad World Tour.

Some fans have taken concern over the video quality of the DVD, after a portion of Jackson's performance of "Bad" from the DVD was shown on ITV. On May 31, 2012, co-heads of Jackson's estate, John McClain and John Branca, released an official statement regarding the quality concerns. It was revealed that, due to poor storage and possible carelessness, dozens of U-matic performance masters (including those from Wembley) could not be located, confirming that Jackson's VHS copy is the only known copy of the concert.

McClain and Branca also revealed that multiple U-matic masters of other performances from the tour did exist, but were unusable. One of the few usable master recordings the Estate possesses from the Bad World Tour was the performance in Yokohama, Japan in 1987. However, the Estate opted not to release this, as they considered it to be nothing more than a modified version of the Victory Tour with three extra songs. This concert also aired on Japanese television. As a result, the Estate stated that a video enhancement lab was hired to restore the VHS copy of Wembley.

== Critical reception ==
Critical reception on the concert itself has mostly been positive. Chaz Lipp described the concert as "simply incredible from start to finish". There has still been a mixed reaction among some fans with regard to the quality of the video. Some felt that the original U-matic video elements should have been located before the release was authorized.

Randall Roberts of the Los Angeles Times criticized the audio mix, saying, "It's a solid, if thinly recorded, document that lacks sonic heft. The rhythm section sounds a mile away, and lacks the pop of a well-recorded concert."

Michael Jones of Blogcritics said "These two recordings just exude pure energy and while watching it I'm thunderstruck by how effortless this lithe little man seems to make spending over two hours singing and dancing his absolute heart out for thousands of adoring fans. (I get tired just lip-syncing and trying to do the occasional move with just my arms, while watching.)" The Second Disc had a glowing review of the Wembley DVD, saying, "The picture quality is clearly that of a videocassette, but it doesn't detract from a stunning performance, and the camera work is generally strong with well-chosen angles. Within moments of opening with 'Wanna Be Startin' Somethin'', Jackson is posing, gyrating, spinning, kicking, stomping and slithering with a sleek fleetness of foot that whips the audience into a frenzied state. He's both graceful and sexually charged, and he is the production. While the singer appears to be lip-synching to a handful of the songs, his performance is, largely, overwhelming and frequently playful. The remarkably well-sequenced concert shows Jackson as an utterly comfortable presence, smiling and taking the stage with ease. There's very little patter as he prefers to concentrate on his angular, Bob Fosse-in-the-future choreographic moves and unstoppable anthems. By the time he dons his famous glove and launches into that mesmerizing moonwalk on 'Billie Jean', it seems that Jackson can't possibly give any more. But he does, dancing with a chorus line of kids in the closing 'Bad' and literally dropping to the floor for the encore of 'Man in the Mirror'."

Evan Sawdey of PopMatters gave a positive review of the DVD, giving it a 7 out of 10, saying, "Here, Jackson is at the peak of his powers, absolutely bursting with energy. Extended dance breaks are added into the songs, his backing quartet of dancers are extremely precise, and yes, that's 80s Sheryl Crow coming out to duet with him on 'I Just Can't Stop Loving You'... Yet the show is remarkably fun, and relatively fast-paced. There are multiple costume changes throughout, with Jackson wearing whatever jacket is appropriate for the song he's singing (a letterman jacket for 'Thriller', a white coat and fedora for 'Smooth Criminal', that signature black leather for 'Bad'). At first, he and his dancers could not be tighter. They exude energy, and perhaps what's most remarkable is how Jackson is able to still sing/sustain notes while doing his numerous laser-precise moves. By the time he starts Moonwalking during 'Billie Jean' (and let there be no mistake: this is as spectacular and smooth as he has ever executed the move), the already-nuts crowd simply goes into overdrive."

Chaz Lipp of The Morton Report had this to say about Jackson's performance: "Perhaps the best part of Bad 25 is the full concert recorded live at London's Wembley Stadium, July 16, 1988. This is simply prime Michael Jackson. He's in fantastic voice throughout, always in control of his instrument—even during the most delicate moments, such as 'She's Out of My Life'. I'd list some highlights, but at the risk of sounding hyperbolic, the whole thing functions as a highlight. This concert is relatively stripped down visually, making it a perfect contrast to the more elaborately produced Live in Bucharest: The Dangerous Tour DVD. Jackson's dancing is as mesmerizing as ever, on full display during tunes such as 'Smooth Criminal' and, of course, 'Billie Jean'."

== Track listing ==
All tracks are written by Michael Jackson, except where noted.

No.	Title	Writer(s)	Length
1.	"Wanna Be Startin' Somethin'"		6:32
2.	"This Place Hotel"		4:43
3.	"Another Part of Me"		4:24
4.	"I Just Can't Stop Loving You" (duet with Sheryl Crow)		4:55
5.	"She's Out of My Life"	Tom Bahler	3:53
6.	"I Want You Back/The Love You Save/I'll Be There"	Berry Gordy; Freddie Perren; Alphonzo Mizell; Deke Richards; Bob West; Willie Hutch; Hal Davis	7:17
7.	"Rock with You"	Rod Temperton	4:23
8.	"Human Nature"	Steve Porcaro; John Bettis	5:12
9.	"Smooth Criminal"		6:24
10.	"Dirty Diana"		6:24
11.	"Thriller"	Temperton	5:29
12.	"Bad Groove (The Band Jam Section)"	Greg Phillinganes; Eric Clapton; Jim Gordon; Phil Collins; Maurice Gibb; Barry Gibb; Robin Gibb; Jackson	13:55
13.	"Workin' Day and Night"		7:59
14.	"Beat It"		6:45
15.	"Billie Jean"		8:36
16.	"Bad"		10:06
17.	"Man in the Mirror"	Siedah Garrett; Glen Ballard	9:24
18.	"The Way You Make Me Feel" (Performed at Wembley Stadium, London on July 14, 1988. (Note: Labelled as July 15, 1988 on the back cover))		5:22
19.	"I Just Can't Stop Loving You/Bad" (duet with Sheryl Crow) (Performed at Yokohama Stadium, Yokohama on September 26, 1987)		11:23

- "Bad Groove (The Band Jam Section)" contains the following pieces:
  - "Band Jam" (composed by Greg Phillinganes)
  - "Layla" (composed by Eric Clapton and Jim Gordon)
  - "Sussudio" (composed by Phil Collins)
  - "You Win Again" (composed by Barry Gibb, Maurice Gibb and Robin Gibb)
  - "Don't Stop 'Til You Get Enough" (composed by Michael Jackson)
- The "Bad Groove" interlude involved the band playing an extended instrumental of "It's Gonna Be a Beautiful Night" by Prince from his 1987 album Sign o' the Times, but was removed during editing of the DVD. Amateur audio of the performance, however, can be found online.

== Personnel ==
Performers

- Michael Jackson – lead vocals, dancer and choreographer

Dancers

- LaVelle Smith – backup dancer
- Evaldo Garcia – backup dancer
- Randy Allaire – backup dancer
- Dominic Lucero – backup dancer

Musicians

- Greg Phillinganes – keyboards, synthesizer, musical director
- Rory Kaplan – keyboards, synthesizers
- Christopher Currell – Synclavier synthesizer, SynthAxe, sound effects
- Ricky Lawson – drums, percussion
- Jennifer Batten – lead guitar, rhythm guitar
- Jon Clark – lead and rhythm guitar
- Don Boyette – bass guitar, synth bass

Vocalists

- Darryl Phinnessee – backing vocals
- Dorian Holley – backing vocals
- Sheryl Crow – backing vocals
- Kevin Dorsey – vocal director, backing vocals

== Charts ==
Chart (2012)	Peak position
Argentinian Music DVDs Chart	2
Australian Music DVDs Chart	2
Austrian Music DVDs Chart	1
Belgian (Flanders) Music DVDs Chart	1
Belgian (Wallonia) Music DVDs Chart	1
Danish Music DVDs Chart	5
Dutch Music DVDs Chart	1
German Albums Chart	64
Italian Music DVDs Chart	1
Norwegian Music DVDs Chart	1
Portuguese Music DVDs Chart	9
Spanish Music DVDs Chart	2
Swedish Music DVDs Chart	1
Swiss Music DVDs Chart	2
UK Video Charts	2
US Billboard DVDs Chart	1

== Certifications ==
Region	Certification	Certified units/sales
Australia (ARIA)	Gold	7,500^{^}
Poland (ZPAV)	Gold	5,000^{*}
United Kingdom (BPI)	Gold	25,000^{*}
United States (RIAA)	Gold	50,000^{^}
^{*} Sales figures based on certification alone.^{^} Shipments figures based on certification alone.
