= I'm So Blue =

I'm So Blue may refer to:

- "I'm So Blue", song by Melanie from Photograph
- I'm So Blue (Michael Jackson song)
- "I'm So Blue", song written by Randy Sharp
- "I'm So Blue", song by Katie Thompson
