= The Way You Make Me Feel =

1987 single by Michael Jackson

Single by Michael Jackson

from the album Bad
- B-side: "The Way You Make Me Feel" (instrumental)
- Released: October 31, 1987
- Recorded: 1987
- Studio: Westlake (studio D), Los Angeles
- Genre: Pop; R&B; new wave
- Length: 4:58 (album version); 4:26 (single version); 7:53 (extended dance mix)
- Label: Epic; CBS
- Songwriter: Michael Jackson
- Producers: Quincy Jones; Michael Jackson (co.)

Michael Jackson singles chronology
"Twenty-Five Miles" (1987)	"The Way You Make Me Feel" (1987)	"Man in the Mirror" (1988)

Music video
- "The Way You Make Me Feel" on YouTube

Audio sample
- "The Way You Make Me Feel": file; help

"The Way You Make Me Feel" is a song by the American singer Michael Jackson, released by Epic Records on October 31, 1987, as the third single from his seventh studio album, Bad. It was written by Jackson and produced by Jackson and Quincy Jones.

The song received positive reviews from contemporary critics. It became Bad's third consecutive single to peak at number one on the Billboard Hot 100 and charted mainly within the top ten and twenty internationally. The music video showed Jackson pursuing and dancing with the model Tatiana Thumbtzen.

"The Way You Make Me Feel" has also been featured on the first disc of Jackson's compilation album HIStory: Past, Present and Future, Book I in 1995, and on others like Number Ones in 2003, The Ultimate Collection in 2004, The Essential Michael Jackson in 2005, or This Is It in 2009. "The Way You Make Me Feel" has been covered by multiple artists.

The song was performed on all of Jackson's world concert tours as a solo artist and was planned to have been performed during the This Is It concerts from 2009 to 2010. Notable live performances include at the 30th Grammy Awards (1988).

== Background and composition ==
"The Way You Make Me Feel" was recorded by Jackson in 1987 for his seventh studio album Bad. Epic Records released the song as the third single from the album in November that year. "The Way You Make Me Feel" was written and co-produced by Jackson, and produced by Quincy Jones. Before the recording of Bad, Jackson had written more than sixty songs for the album, with plans of releasing a three-disc album, but after Jones convinced Jackson to make Bad a one-disc LP, "The Way You Make Me Feel" and ten other songs were selected for the album.

According to Stereogum, each song on Bad shows a different side of Jackson: "I Just Can't Stop Loving You" was the "soft, approachable reintroduction", "Bad" was the "statement of intent, the mean-mugging dance anthem", while "The Way You Make Me Feel" "served a different purpose; it made Michael Jackson out to be a flirt".

"The Way You Make Me Feel" has been featured on multiple greatest hits and compilation albums by Jackson since the song's release, including the first disc of Jackson's two-disc compilation album HIStory: Past, Present and Future, Book I in 1995, Jackson's greatest hits album Number Ones in 2003, and the This Is It compilation album in 2009.

"The Way You Make Me Feel" is a pop and R&B song composed of blues harmonies. Jackson's vocal range on the recording spans from B_{3} to A_{5}.

== Critical reception ==
"The Way You Make Me Feel" generally received positive reviews from contemporary music critics. AllMusic reviewer Stephen Thomas Erlewine listed the song alongside the album's title track, "I Just Can't Stop Loving You", and "Man in the Mirror" as being "track picks" from Bad. Erlewine commented that out of all of Bad's songs, "only three can stand alongside album tracks from its predecessor", which were "Bad", "The Way You Make Me Feel", and "I Just Can't Stop Loving You". Jon Pareles, a writer for The New York Times, commented that Jackson's songs, "The Way You Make Me Feel" and "I Just Can't Stop Loving You", "say nothing more personalized than their titles".

Richard Cromelin, from the Los Angeles Times, described "The Way You Make Me Feel" as being a "loping shuffle". Rolling Stone' David Sigerson commented that "The Way You Make Me Feel" was "nearly as good" as being the third best song on Bad. Greg Quill, writing for the Toronto Star, commented that "the notion of individual as opposed to institutionalized self-improvement", a recurring theme for the singer, was present "to a lesser extent in the love songs 'The Way You Make Me Feel' and 'Liberian Girl', which deal more with surrender than conquest or self-gratification." The Washington Post's Rickard Harrington commented that on songs like "The Way You Make Me Feel", Jackson "sings the way he dances". Cash Box called it a "brilliantly crafted upbeat pop number" with "memorable lyrics" and "a playful musical backdrop." "The Way You Make Me Feel" tied at number 22 on The Village Voice's Pazz & Jop critics' poll of 1987.

== Chart performance ==
"The Way You Make Me Feel" generally charted within the top ten and top twenty positions on music charts worldwide. The song climbed to number seven on the Billboard Hot 100 on the chart's issue date of December 26, 1987. After charting within the top ten for five weeks, the song peaked at number one on the Hot 100 on January 23, 1988. "The Way You Make Me Feel" became the album's third consecutive single to reach number one on the Hot 100. The song charted on Billboard's Adult Contemporary chart, peaking at number nine, and on the Hot Dance Music/Maxi Single Sales chart at the peak of number three. The song also charted at number one on the Billboard Hot Black Singles chart and Dance Club Play Singles chart.

The song entered the United Kingdom singles charts at number sixteen on December 5, 1987. The following week the song moved up thirteen spaces to number three, which was the song's peak position. The song stayed at its peak position for two consecutive weeks, and remained on the country's chart for ten weeks, before falling out of the top 100 positions, only to re-enter the charts two weeks later.

The song peaked at number two on New Zealand music charts on January 17, 1988, and remained on the chart for a total of eleven weeks in 1987 and 1988. In the Netherlands, the song debuted on the chart at number twenty on November 28, 1987. Two weeks later the song charted at its peak position, at number six. "The Way You Make Me Feel" debuted at number fourteen on Switzerland charts on December 13, 1987; the following week, the song charted at its peak position at number eight. The song charted within the top thirty positions for ten consecutive weeks from 1987 to 1988. The song debuted on French music charts on December 26, 1987, at number 47, and eventually peaked within the top thirty positions at number 29. The song charted within the top 50 positions for ten consecutive weeks on the country's chart. The song has sold over 2 million digital copies as of August 2018.

"The Way You Make Me Feel" re-entered music charts worldwide after Jackson's music was re-issued for the Visionary album. The song debuted on the Spanish Singles Chart at number one on April 9, 2006. The song remained on the country's chart for ten weeks. In Italy, the song debuted within the top ten, peaking at number seven, on April 6, 2006; after two weeks, the song charted out of the top 100 positions. "The Way You Make Me Feel" re-entered Dutch charts on April 1, 2006, at number 24. The song re-entered French music charts on April 1, 2006, at number 59; the song remained within the top 100 positions for two consecutive weeks.

Following Jackson's death, his music experienced a surge in popularity. The song re-entered Dutch charts for the third time on July 4, 2009, at its peak position at number 40; the song remained on the chart for four consecutive weeks in 2009. The song charted within the top ten, peaking at number six, on the Billboard Hot Digital Songs on July 11, due to digital download sales. The song debuted on Swedish charts at number 30 on July 3, and peaked at number 24 the following week. On July 4, the song re-entered the United Kingdom charts at number 47, and peaked at number 34 the following week.

== Music video ==
The music video for "The Way You Make Me Feel" was directed by Joe Pytka and was filmed in June 1987. It was choreographed by Jackson and Vincent Paterson. The short version of the video is six minutes and forty-four seconds long and the full version is nine minutes and thirty-three seconds long. The video begins with a group of men, including Jackson, trying to pick up women, but failing. Jackson is told to go home and not to hang around with the other guys anymore. When Jackson walks home, an elderly man (Joe Seneca), who is sitting on the steps of his house, tells him to just be himself. Jackson notices a woman (Tatiana Thumbtzen), walking down the streets alone.

Shortly after, Jackson walks out of an alley and stands in front of Thumbtzen while she is walking down the street. However, she ignores him and keeps walking, which prompts the other guys to make fun of him. Jackson shouts at them, which gets the attention of everyone, including Thumbtzen. After walking up to her, Jackson begins singing "The Way You Make Me Feel" to her while also dancing. Uninterested, Thumbtzen walks away. He follows her, having been cheered on by his friends to pursue her. This leads to the man to continue to pursue the woman throughout the neighborhood. However, Thumbtzen begins to welcome his advances and starts teasing him. The video ends with the man eventually winning the woman over, and hugging her, while a fire hydrant sprays out water. The videoclip features an appearance by his sister La Toya as one of Thumbtzen's friends.

The music video was released on October 31, 1987, and received one nomination at the 1988 MTV Video Music Awards Ceremony. The video, alongside Jackson's "Bad" video, was nominated for Best Choreography, but lost to Jackson's younger sister Janet's video "The Pleasure Principle".

The music video was included on the video albums: Video Greatest Hits – HIStory (long version on DVD and short version on VHS), Number Ones (short version), Michael Jackson's Vision (long version) and the Target version DVD of Bad 25 (long version).

The introduction of the full version of the video also samples the Roy Ayers 1985 song "Hot" (written by Binky Brice, Philip Hunter Field and James Mtume) from his You Might Be Surprised album.

== Live performances ==
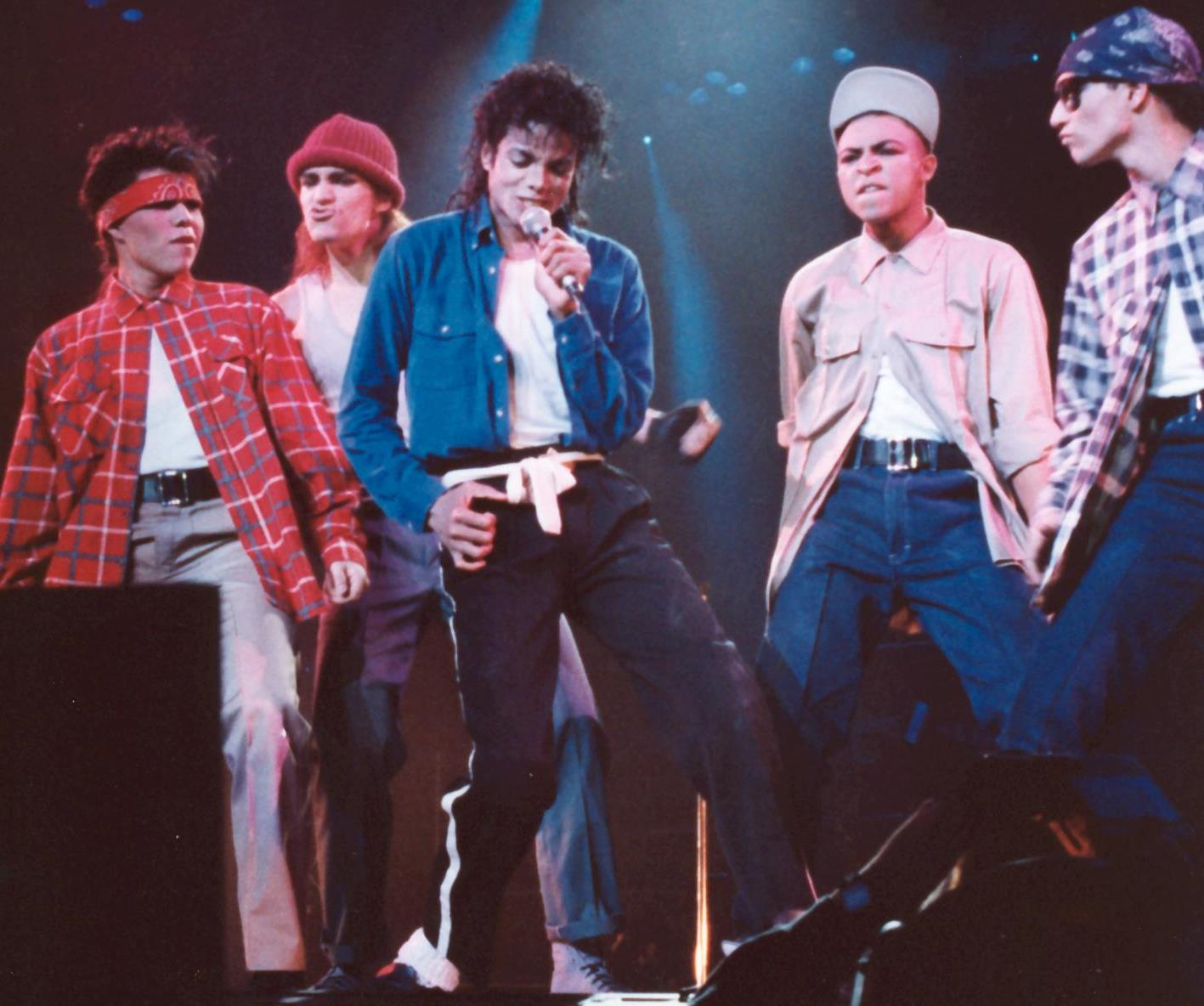
Jackson performing "The Way You Make Me Feel" in his signature outfit for the song in 1988 during the Bad World Tour. During performances of the song Jackson would do a dance routine that included four dancers in the background.

"The Way You Make Me Feel" was performed by Jackson on all three of his world concert series tours as a solo artist as well as during award shows. For a majority of the song's performances, Jackson would wear a blue dress shirt with a white T-shirt and black pants with a white belt. The song was first performed in concert by Jackson during the encore of the second leg of his Bad World Tour from 1987 to 1989. A live version of the song is available on the DVD Live at Wembley July 16, 1988.

He performed "The Way You Make Me Feel" at the 1988 Grammy Awards ceremony, during which Jackson wore his signature outfit and his signature black fedora, while doing a dance routine with four other dancers, and performed the song along with another one of his songs, "Man in the Mirror". This performance was staged and choreographed by Vincent Paterson.

Tatiana Thumbtzen, who appeared in the short film for "The Way You Make Me Feel", joined Jackson in some concerts of his Bad World Tour, and performed the song with him, strutting across the stage while he pursued her. However, she was fired from the tour by Jackson's manager after an incident during one of the performances in which she approached Jackson and kissed him onstage.

"The Way You Make Me Feel" was also performed during the first leg of Jackson's Dangerous World Tour from June 1992 to November 1993. The tour was supposed to be longer, but was canceled due to Jackson's health concerns and stress from the child sexual abuse accusations made against him. The next performance of the song was during select dates of Jackson's world concert series tour, HIStory. The song was performed during selected concerts from September 1996 to June 1997. The last performance of the song was at the Michael Jackson: 30th Anniversary Celebration in 2001 at Madison Square Garden on September 7 and 10, 2001. The video footage from the performance was featured on CBS in November 2001 as a two-hour television special.

Since March 2009, Jackson was preparing to perform "The Way You Make Me Feel" during his This Is It concert series from 2009 to 2010. Following Jackson's death in June of the same year, video footage of Jackson rehearsing the song was featured in the 2009 concert documentary film Michael Jackson's This Is It. The video rehearsal footage was also featured on the films DVD in January 2010.

=== Guests ===
Guests who filled Thumbtzen's role in live performances included the following:

- Sheryl Crow, who provided background vocals during the Bad World Tour. She assumed the role during the July 15, 1988, show at Wembley.
- Britney Spears both filled Thumbtzen's role and performed the song with Jackson as a duet during the first 30th Anniversary Celebration show on September 7, 2001, at Madison Square Garden.

== Cover versions and influences ==
In 1989, German comedian Otto Waalkes parodied the music video in his film Otto: The Alien from East Frisia. In 2003, Australian music duo Shakaya covered "The Way You Make Me Feel" and released their version as a non-album single on April 14, 2003. The song only charted on Australian charts, peaking at number 21 on the country's music charts. In December 2009, Stacey Solomon, a contestant on The X Factor in the United Kingdom, performed a cover of the song during the show's semi-finals, receiving mixed opinions from the show's judges. In January 2010, Nick Jonas performed the song during a concert at the Warner Theatre in Washington, DC. In February 2010, Whitney Houston performed "The Way You Make Me Feel", along with Jackson's "Wanna Be Startin' Somethin'", during her I Look to You Tour. In October 2016, Olympic gymnast Laurie Hernandez and Dancing with the Stars pro dancer Valentin Chmerkovskiy, the eventual winners of the 23rd season, performed a jazz routine dance to the song during the reality dance competition's Cirque du Soleil-themed episode.

== Credits and personnel ==
- Written and composed by Michael Jackson
- Produced by Quincy Jones
- Co-produced by Michael Jackson
- Michael Jackson: lead and background vocals, fingerclicks
- John Robinson: drums
- Douglas Getschal: drum programming
- Eric Gale, David Williams: guitars
- Kim Hutchcroft, Larry Williams: saxophones
- Gary Grant, Jerry Hey: trumpets
- Ollie E. Brown, Paulinho Da Costa: percussion
- Christopher Currell: Synclavier, fingerclicks
- John Barnes, Michael Boddicker, Greg Phillinganes: synthesizers
- Larry Williams: synthesizer programming
- Rhythm and vocal arrangements by Michael Jackson
- Horn arrangement by Jerry Hey
- Engineered and mixed by Bruce Swedien

== Charts ==
=== Weekly charts ===
Chart (1987–1988)	Peak position
Australia (Kent Music Report)	5
Austria (Ö3 Austria Top 40)	15
Belgium (Ultratop 50 Flanders)	2
Canada Adult Contemporary (RPM)	3
Canada Top Singles (RPM)	7
Europe (European Hot 100 Singles)	3
Finland (Suomen virallinen singlelista)	17
France (SNEP)	29
Germany (GfK)	12
Ireland (IRMA)	1
Italy (Musica e Dischi)	4
Italy Airplay (Music & Media)	3
Netherlands (Dutch Top 40)	6
Netherlands (Single Top 100)	6
New Zealand (Recorded Music NZ)	2
South Africa (Springbok Radio)	16
Spain (AFYVE)	2
Switzerland (Schweizer Hitparade)	8
UK Singles (Official Charts)	3
US Billboard Adult Contemporary	9
US Billboard Hot 100	1
US Billboard Hot Black Singles	1
US Billboard Hot Dance Club Play	1
US Billboard Hot Dance Music/Maxi-Singles Sales	3
US Cash Box	1

Chart (2006)	Peak position
Australia (Kent Music Report)	79
France (SNEP)	59
Ireland (IRMA)	26
Italy (FIMI)	7
Netherlands (Single Top 100)	24
Spain (Promusicae)	1
UK Singles (Official Charts)	17
UK Hip Hop/R&B (Official Charts)	2

Chart (2009–2010)	Peak position
Australia (ARIA)	13
Austria (Ö3 Austria Top 40)	50
Belgium (Back Catalogue Singles Flanders)	9
Canada (Hot Canadian Digital Singles)	13
Denmark (Tracklisten)	20
Netherlands (Single Top 100)	40
New Zealand (Recorded Music NZ)	17
Sweden (Sverigetopplistan)	24
Switzerland (Schweizer Hitparade)	25
UK Singles (Official Charts)	34
US Billboard Hot Digital Songs	6

Chart (2017)	Peak position
Poland Airplay (ZPAV)	100

Chart (2026)	Peak position
France (SNEP)	127
Global 200 (Billboard)	56
Greece International (IFPI)	92
Norway Airplay (IFPI Norge)	67

=== Year-end charts ===
Chart (1987)	Position
Belgium (Ultratop 50 Flanders)	92
UK Singles (OCC)	56

Chart (1988)	Position
Australia (Kent Music Report)	86
US Billboard Hot 100	36

== Certifications ==
Region	Certification	Certified units/sales
Australia (ARIA)	Gold	35,000^{^}
Canada (Music Canada)	3× Platinum	240,000^{‡}
Denmark (IFPI Danmark)	Platinum	90,000^{‡}
Mexico (AMPROFON)	Diamond+2× Platinum+Gold	450,000^{‡}
New Zealand (RMNZ)	3× Platinum	90,000^{‡}
Spain (Promusicae)	Gold	30,000^{‡}
United Kingdom (BPI)	2× Platinum	1,200,000^{‡}
United States (RIAA)	2× Platinum	2,000,000^{‡}
Streaming
Greece (IFPI Greece)	Gold	1,000,000^{†}
^{^} Shipments figures based on certification alone.^{‡} Sales+streaming figures based on certification alone.^{†} Streaming-only figures based on certification alone.

== See also ==
- List of number-one R&B singles of 1987 (U.S.)
- List of number-one R&B singles of 1988 (U.S.)
- List of number-one singles of 1987 (Ireland)
- List of Billboard Hot 100 number-one singles of 1988
- List of Cash Box Top 100 number-one singles of 1988
- List of number-one dance singles of 1988 (U.S.)
- List of number-one singles of 2006 (Spain)

== Bibliography ==
- Grant, Adrian (2009). Michael Jackson: The Visual Documentary. Omnibus Press. ISBN 978-1-84938-261-8.
- Taraborrelli, J. Randy (2004). The Magic and the Madness. Terra Alta, WV: Headline. ISBN 0-330-42005-4.
