= Price of Fame =

Price of Fame and The Price of Fame may refer to:

== Music ==
- "Price of Fame" (Brent Faiyaz song)
- "Price of Fame" (Michael Jackson song)
- "Price of Fame", a song by Submersed from Immortal Verses
- "Price of Fame", a song by Paloma Faith from The Architect (album)
- The Price of Fame, 2006 album by Bow Wow

== Film & TV ==
- The Price of Fame (1916 film), American silent film by Charles Brabin
- The Price of Fame (2014 film), French film by Xavier Beauvois
- "The Price of Fame", a 2003 episode of Everwood, see List of Everwood episodes
- The Price of Fame, a 2005 episode of The Buzz on Maggie
