= List of number-one singles of 1987 (Ireland) =

This is a list of singles which have reached number one on the Irish Singles Chart in 1987.

Week ending	Song	Artist	Ref.
3 January	"Caravan of Love"	The Housemartins	
10 January	"Reet Petite"	Jackie Wilson	
17 January	"Reet Petite"	Jackie Wilson	
24 January	"Reet Petite"	Jackie Wilson	
31 January	"Jack Your Body"	Steve "Silk" Hurley	
7 February	"I Knew You Were Waiting (For Me)"	George Michael and Aretha Franklin	
14 February	"I Knew You Were Waiting (For Me)"	George Michael and Aretha Franklin	
21 February	"I Knew You Were Waiting (For Me)"	George Michael and Aretha Franklin	
28 February	"Stand by Me"	Ben E. King	
7 March	"Stand by Me"	Ben E. King	
14 March	"Stand by Me"	Ben E. King	
21 March	"Everything I Own"	Boy George	
28 March	"Everything I Own"	Boy George	
4 April	"With or Without You"	U2	
11 April	"With or Without You"	U2	
18 April	"The Irish Rover"	The Pogues and The Dubliners	
25 April	"The Irish Rover"	The Pogues and The Dubliners	
2 May	"Nothing's Gonna Stop Us Now"	Starship	
9 May	"Nothing's Gonna Stop Us Now"	Starship	
16 May	"Hold Me Now"	Johnny Logan	
23 May	"Hold Me Now"	Johnny Logan	
30 May	"Hold Me Now"	Johnny Logan	
6 June	"Hold Me Now"	Johnny Logan	
13 June	"I Still Haven't Found What I'm Looking For"	U2	
20 June	"I Want Your Sex"	George Michael	
27 June	"Star Trekkin'"	The Firm	
4 July	"It's a Sin"	Pet Shop Boys	
11 July	"It's a Sin"	Pet Shop Boys	
18 July	"Who's That Girl"	Madonna	
25 July	"Who's That Girl"	Madonna	
1 August	"La Bamba"	Los Lobos	
8 August	"La Bamba"	Los Lobos	
15 August	"I Just Can't Stop Loving You"	Michael Jackson featuring Siedah Garrett	(Note: Irish Independent (2015) suggests that "I Just Can't Stop Loving You" was the No. 1 song the week of 22 August.)
22 August	"What Have I Done to Deserve This?"	Pet Shop Boys featuring Dusty Springfield	
29 August	"Four Track EP"	Daniel O'Donnell	
5 September	"Where the Streets Have No Name"	U2	
12 September	"Where the Streets Have No Name"	U2	
19 September	"Where the Streets Have No Name"	U2	
26 September	"Bad"	Michael Jackson	
3 October	"Bad"	Michael Jackson	
10 October	"Full Metal Jacket (I Want to be Your Drill Instructor)"	Abigail Mead and Nigel Goulding	
17 October	"You Win Again"	Bee Gees	
24 October	"You Win Again"	Bee Gees	
31 October	"You Win Again"	Bee Gees	
7 November	"You Win Again"	Bee Gees	
14 November	"Got My Mind Set on You"	George Harrison	
21 November	"China in Your Hand"	T'Pau	
28 November	"China in Your Hand"	T'Pau	
5 December	"The Way You Make Me Feel"	Michael Jackson	
12 December	"Fairytale of New York"	The Pogues, featuring Kirsty MacColl	
19 December	"Fairytale of New York"	The Pogues, featuring Kirsty MacColl	
26 December	"Fairytale of New York"	The Pogues, featuring Kirsty MacColl	

- 27 Number Ones
- Most weeks at No.1 (song): "Hold Me Now" - Johnny Logan, "You Win Again" - The Bee Gees (4)
- Most weeks at No.1 (artist): U2 (6)
- Most No.1s: U2, Michael Jackson (3)

== See also ==
- 1987 in music
- Irish Singles Chart
- List of artists who reached number one in Ireland
