= Bad 25 =

Studio album (reissue) by Michael Jackson
- Released: September 18, 2012
- Recorded: January 5, 1984 – July 29, 1987 (disc 1; tracks 1–10 of disc 2); July 16, 1988 (live at Wembley)
- Length: 179:33 (CDs); 116:21 (DVD)
- Labels: MJJ; Epic; Legacy; Sony
- Producers: Afrojack; Michael Jackson; Quincy Jones; Nero

Michael Jackson chronology
Immortal (2011)	Bad 25 (2012)	Xscape (2014)

Singles from Bad 25
- 1. "I Just Can't Stop Loving You" Released: June 1, 2012; 2. "Bad (Afrojack Remix) [DJ Buddha Edit]" Released: August 14, 2012; 3. "I'm So Blue" Released: October 1, 2012

Bad 25 is the 25th anniversary edition reissue of the American singer-songwriter Michael Jackson's seventh studio album Bad (1987). This is the second album by Jackson re-released on its 25th anniversary, the first being Thriller 25 (2008). Bad has sold 35 million copies worldwide, making it one of the best-selling albums of all time. Bad 25 was released on September 18, 2012, with co-operation with Epic, Legacy Recordings and MJJ Productions. Along with the original album, Bad 25 contains demo recordings recorded during the Bad era, with the deluxe edition also containing a live CD and DVD of Live at Wembley July 16, 1988, Jackson's performance at Wembley Stadium in the United Kingdom during his Bad world tour.

To implement a new "Live for Now" campaign, Pepsi promoted the 25th anniversary of Bad by printing one billion Pepsi cans with a photo of Jackson from the "Smooth Criminal" video. Limited edition 16 ounce (450 ml) cans were produced and distributed worldwide. On September 18, 2012, Sony Music and the Estate of Michael Jackson in partnership with BET broadcast a two-hour TV special titled Bad 25: The Short Films of Michael Jackson, which showed the short films from Bad.

Bad 25 debuted at number one on the Billboard Top Pop Catalog Albums chart and in Italy, and has since been certified Gold in Poland. The album received critical acclaim; some criticism however was directed at the production and features on the album.

== Release ==
Announced in May 2012 by the Michael Jackson Company LLC, various formats of Bad 25 were released simultaneously on September 18, 2012. The album, a two-disc set, includes the original album and unreleased material recorded during the Bad sessions. The material includes early demo versions of songs from the album, demos of songs not included on the final album, and remixes.

The deluxe edition of the album, which is a box set, includes both the two discs along with a CD and DVD of the performance on July 16, 1988, at Wembley Stadium in London, a booklet with photos from the making of the Bad album and behind the scenes photos from the short films for Bad, a two-sided poster and a Bad 25 sticker. A vinyl version of the original 1987 release (which does not include "Leave Me Alone") was also released. Three songs, "Streetwalker", "Fly Away" and "Todo Mi Amor Eres Tú" (the Spanish version of "I Just Can't Stop Loving You") appeared on Bad: Special Edition in 2001. The Japanese edition includes "Bad" (Live at Yokohama Stadium September 1987).

Bad 25 is the ninth album released by Sony and Motown since Michael Jackson's death on June 25, 2009.

== Marketing and promotion ==
To implement a new "Live for Now" campaign, Pepsi planned to promote the 25th anniversary of Bad by printing one billion Pepsi cans with a photo of Michael Jackson from the "Smooth Criminal" video (which is not to be included on the CD or DVD itself). Limited edition 16 ounce (450 ml) cans were produced and distributed worldwide.

The documentary was shown at the 69th Venice International Film Festival from August 29 to September 8, 2012, and premiered (in an edited version) on ABC on November 22, 2012.

On September 18, 2012, Sony Music and the Estate of Michael Jackson in partnership with BET broadcast a two-hour TV special titled Bad 25: The Short Films of Michael Jackson, which shows the short films from Bad, which like Thriller revolutionized the industry, and also features interviews with fans, journalists and critics.

== Singles ==
"I Just Can't Stop Loving You", the original debut single from Bad, was re-released as a CD single in the United States on June 5, 2012, as a Walmart exclusive. An unreleased demo, titled "Don't Be Messin' 'Round", is featured as the single's B-side. The song has been called a "beautiful solo piano and vocal piece" by Jackson's longtime engineer Bruce Swedien. The single, which has not been available as a digital download, has also been released on vinyl (the vinyl will include the original B-side, "Baby Be Mine" from Thriller, rather than "Don't Be Messin' 'Round"). The re-released single debuted atop Billboard's Hot Singles Sales chart, which ranks the top-selling physical singles according to Nielsen SoundScan. The new release of "I Just Can't Stop Loving You" debuted at No. 1 with 5,000 copies sold.

"Bad (Afrojack Remix) [DJ Buddha Edit]" featuring Pitbull was released on August 14, 2012. As a digital single prior to the album release, the single appeared on several countries' music charts. It debuted at Number 52 on Billboard Japan Hot 100 chart as the title "Bad 2012" on the week of September 15, 2012, and peaked at Number 6 several weeks later. It also appeared on US Billboard Dance/Electronic Digital Songs Chart with Number 45 for one week on September 1, 2012. On the week of September 29, 2012, it debuted on Hot Dance Club Songs chart at Number 42, and peaked at Number 18. It also appeared on Austrian Singles Chart at Number 45.

"I'm So Blue" impacted Italian radio on October 1, 2012, and was also released to some Polish and Chinese stations in December.

== Commercial performance ==
The album opened in the United Kingdom at number six with sales of 11,475 copies, but for the second week, it fell to number thirty-eight with a severe buffeting of 3,365 copies sales. In Japan, 26,000 copies of this album had been sold during the first week of its release as number ten on Oricon album chart, the sales fell to 5,307 copies as number twenty-four for the second week. In the United States, as per Billboard's chart ruling, the 2 CD standard version of Bad 25 is regarded as the same album as the original Bad (1987) but with added studio tracks, and therefore caused Bad to re-enter the Billboard 200 albums chart at No. 23, while the deluxe edition (including a full live disc) is regarded as a new album release and debuted at No. 46 on the Billboard 200. The album sold a combined total of about 47,000 copies in its first week in the US, spending 3 consecutive weeks atop the Top Pop Catalog Albums chart. Spike Lee's Bad 25 documentary aired on ABC Thanksgiving (November 22) in the United States in a 60-minute edited version while the full 123 minute version was broadcast in the UK and Ireland on BBC2 on December 1. The documentary received widespread acclaim and currently holds a 90% rating on review site Rotten Tomatoes. The standalone version of Jackson's Live at Wembley July 16, 1988 DVD debuted at the top of DVD sales charts of several countries including the United States, Italy, France, Sweden, Austria and Norway. It debuted at number 2 in Ireland, the UK, Spain, Switzerland and Australia. Parts of the Wembley show were seen through the Bad 25 special.

== Critical reception ==
Professional ratings
Review scores
Source	Rating
Entertainment Weekly	A
Rolling Stone	4.5/5 stars
Drowned in Sound	9/10

The album received critical acclaim, though some of the new material was received unfavorably. Ray Rahman from Entertainment Weekly grades the album "A", and reminds the box set is "a potent reminder of just how much Bad's pulsing pop holds up", and the previously unreleased songs are "real treasures". Mike Diver from BBC said, it is "an awesome, evergreen and essential pop masterpiece". Chaz Lipp from The Morton Report reviews the album "a terrific set". The Los Angeles Times reacted positively to the product but was critical of the new remixes, especially the collaborations with Nero, Pitbull, and Afrojack. Randall Roberts said "these are terrible commercial house tracks, and are an insult to MJ's memory because they do it so ungracefully". Evan Sawdey from Popmatters gave the release 7/10, criticizing Afrojack as "outright trash", and saying of Nero's "Speed Demon" remix: "it ends up sounding more like a Nero song with MJ's vocals than it does a genuine Michael Jackson remix". Supajam simply referred to the remixes as a disgrace, while Michael Cragg from The Guardian described Afrojack's "Bad" remix as "a clubbed-up remix featuring the world's worst rapper, Pitbull. He lazily croaks his way through two verses, spouting such lines as "I'm so out of this planet I speak a third language called that moon talk, in four years catch me with a billion doing that moonwalk". Just after he says billion he nearly manages to soil the trademark "hee hee", which only just masks the distant sound of Jackson spinning in his grave."

== Formats ==
Standard edition

- Two disc set (album, bonus tracks disc)

Deluxe edition

- Four disc set (standard edition + concert CD + concert DVD + poster + sticker)

Deluxe collector's edition

- Four disc set (deluxe edition) + exclusive T-shirt design, exclusive headphones, "I Just Can't Stop Loving You" numbered vinyl single, Bad world tour souvenir package reproduction.

Three 180 gram vinyl LP set

- Three 180 gram vinyl discs containing a tri-gatefold jacket and the re-mastered original Bad album + all tracks from disc 2 of the 2CD edition.

Picture vinyl

- Picture disc LP (original album)

Wal-Mart exclusive

- Two disc set (standard edition) + exclusive T-shirt

Target exclusive

- Three disc set (standard edition + exclusive music video compilation DVD)

iTunes exclusive

- Digital release consisting of the standard edition + concert CD + "Bad" short film

HMV UK exclusive

- Bonus CD given to any pre-order of a Bad 25 product at HMV's website only, featuring exclusive track "Bad (Remix by Afrojack featuring Pitbull - The Derry Mix)."

Japan exclusive

- Standard and Deluxe editions with bonus track "Bad (Live at Yokohama Stadium, September 1987)."

== Track listing ==
All tracks written by Michael Jackson, except where noted. All studio tracks produced by Quincy Jones and Michael Jackson, except where noted.

Disc 1: Bad
No.	Title	Writer(s)	Length
1.	"Bad"		4:07
2.	"The Way You Make Me Feel"		4:58
3.	"Speed Demon"		4:01
4.	"Liberian Girl"		3:53
5.	"Just Good Friends" (duet with Stevie Wonder)	Terry Britten; Graham Lyle	4:08
6.	"Another Part of Me"		3:54
7.	"Man in the Mirror"	Siedah Garrett; Glen Ballard	5:19
8.	"I Just Can't Stop Loving You" (duet with Siedah Garrett)		4:12
9.	"Dirty Diana"		4:41
10.	"Smooth Criminal"		4:17
11.	"Leave Me Alone"		4:40
Total length:			48:10

Disc 2: Bonus material
No.	Title	Writer(s)	Producer(s)	Length
1.	"Don't Be Messin' 'Round" (Recorded in 1986 during the Bad sessions)		Jackson	4:18
2.	"I'm So Blue" (Recorded in 1987 during the Bad sessions)		Jackson	4:06
3.	"Song Groove (a.k.a. Abortion Papers)" (Recorded in 1987 during the Bad sessions)		Jackson	4:26
4.	"Free" (Recorded in 1987 during the Bad sessions)		Jackson	4:24
5.	"Price of Fame" (Recorded in 1986–87 during the Bad sessions)		Jackson	4:32
6.	"Al Capone" (Recorded in 1985 or 1986 during the Bad sessions)		Jackson	3:33
7.	"Streetwalker" (3 versions were recorded in 1986, 1987 and 1988 under the working title Florida Groove; this version produced by Bill Bottrell was recorded in 1988 shortly after the Bad sessions) (Previously released on the 2001 special edition of Bad)		Jackson	5:52
8.	"Fly Away" (Recorded in 1987 during the Bad sessions) (Previously released on the 2001 special edition of Bad)		Jackson	3:26
9.	"Todo mi amor eres tú" (duet with Siedah Garrett) (Spanish version of "I Just Can't Stop Loving You"; previously released on the 2001 special edition of Bad)	Jackson; Rubén Blades		4:04
10.	"Je ne veux pas la fin de nous" (duet with Siedah Garrett) (French version of "I Just Can't Stop Loving You")	Jackson; Christine "Coco" Decroix		4:07
11.	"Bad" (Remix by Afrojack featuring Pitbull – DJ Buddha Edit)	Jackson; Armando Pérez	Jones; Jackson; Afrojack	4:26
12.	"Speed Demon" (Remix by Nero)		Jones; Jackson; Nero	4:08
13.	"Bad" (Remix by Afrojack – Club Mix)		Jones; Jackson; Afrojack	7:31
Total length:				56:09

Disc 2: Bonus material (Japanese bonus track)
No.	Title	Length
14.	"Bad" (Live at Yokohama Stadium September 26, 1987)	4:41
Total length:		60:50

Disc 3: Live at Wembley July 16, 1988 (Deluxe edition)
No.	Title	Writer(s)	Length
1.	"Wanna Be Startin' Somethin'"		5:21
2.	"This Place Hotel"		4:54
3.	"Another Part of Me"		4:03
4.	"I Just Can't Stop Loving You" (duet with Sheryl Crow)		4:24
5.	"She's Out of My Life"	Tom Bahler	3:16
6.	"I Want You Back/The Love You Save/I'll Be There"	Berry Gordy Jr.; Alphonzo Mizell; Frederick Perren; Deke Richards; Hal Davis; Willie Hutch; Bob West	5:06
7.	"Rock with You"	Rod Temperton	4:05
8.	"Human Nature"	Steve Porcaro; John Bettis	4:29
9.	"Smooth Criminal"		4:42
10.	"Dirty Diana"		5:01
11.	"Thriller"	Temperton	4:28
12.	"Workin' Day and Night"		5:54
13.	"Beat It"		5:45
14.	"Billie Jean"		5:39
15.	"Bad"		4:28
16.	"Man in the Mirror"	Garrett; Ballard	6:22
Total length:			75:14

DVD: Live at Wembley July 16, 1988 (Deluxe edition)
No.	Title	Writer(s)	Length
1.	"Wanna Be Startin' Somethin'"		6:32
2.	"This Place Hotel"		4:43
3.	"Another Part of Me"		4:24
4.	"I Just Can't Stop Loving You" (duet with Sheryl Crow)		4:55
5.	"She's Out of My Life"	Bahler	3:53
6.	"I Want You Back/The Love You Save/I'll Be There"	Gordy Jr., Mizell, Perren, Richards, Davis, Hutch, West	7:17
7.	"Rock with You"	Temperton	4:23
8.	"Human Nature"	Steve Porcaro; John Bettis	5:12
9.	"Smooth Criminal"		6:24
10.	"Dirty Diana"		6:24
11.	"Thriller"	Temperton	5:29
12.	"Bad Groove (The Band Jam Section)"	Greg Phillinganes; Jackson; Barry Gibb; Robin Gibb; Maurice Gibb; Eric Clapton; Jim Gordon; Phil Collins	13:55
13.	"Workin' Day and Night"		7:59
14.	"Beat It"		6:45
15.	"Billie Jean"		8:36
16.	"Bad"		10:06
17.	"Man in the Mirror"	Garrett; Ballard	9:24
Total length:			116:21

DVD: Live at Wembley July 16, 1988 (Deluxe edition bonus features)
No.	Title	Length
18.	"The Way You Make Me Feel" (Performed at Wembley Stadium, London on July 15, 1988)	5:22
19.	"I Just Can't Stop Loving You/Bad" (duet with Sheryl Crow) (Performed at Yokohama Stadium, Yokohama on September 26, 1987)	11:23
Total length:		133:06

DVD: Bad music videos (Target exclusive)
No.	Title	Director(s)	Length
1.	"Bad" (short version)	Martin Scorsese	4:21
2.	"The Way You Make Me Feel" (long version)	Joe Pytka	9:24
3.	"Man in the Mirror"	Donald Wilson	5:02
4.	"Dirty Diana"	Joe Pytka	5:04
5.	"Smooth Criminal" (end credits version)	Colin Chilvers	4:12
6.	"Another Part of Me"	Patrick T. Kelly	4:44
7.	"Speed Demon"	Jerry Kramer; Will Vinton	10:08
8.	"Leave Me Alone"	Jim Blashfield; Paul Diener	4:37
9.	"Liberian Girl"	Jim Yukich	5:33
Total length:			53:05

== Charts ==
Chart (2012)	Peak position
Australian Albums Chart	14
Austrian Albums Chart	10
Belgian Albums Chart (Flanders)	16
Belgian Albums Chart (Wallonia)	1
Dutch Albums Chart	1
Finnish Albums Chart	27
French Albums Chart	5
German Albums Chart	4
Greek Albums Chart	13
Hong Kong Albums Chart	5
Hungarian Albums Chart	19
Irish Albums Chart	19
Italian Albums Chart	1
Japanese Albums Chart (Billboard)	8
Japanese Albums Chart (Oricon)	10
Mexican Albums Chart	68
Norwegian Albums Chart	20
Polish Albums Chart	12
South Korean Albums Chart	5
Spanish Albums Chart	2
Swedish Albums Chart	14
Swiss Albums Chart	13
UK Albums Chart	6
US Billboard 200	23 (standard); 46 (deluxe)

== Certifications ==
Region	Certification	Certified units/sales
Mexico (AMPROFON)	2× Platinum+Gold	150,000^{‡}
Poland (ZPAV)	Gold	10,000^{*}
^{*} Sales figures based on certification alone.^{‡} Sales+streaming figures based on certification alone.

== Release history ==
List of release dates, showing country or region, record label, and format
Region	Date	Label	Format	Ref.
Austria	September 14, 2012	Epic; Legacy; MJJ	CD; LP; digital download	
Germany	September 14, 2012	Epic; Legacy; MJJ	CD; LP; digital download	
France	September 17, 2012	Epic; Legacy; MJJ	CD; LP; digital download	
United Kingdom	September 17, 2012	Epic; Legacy; MJJ	CD; LP; digital download	
United States	September 18, 2012	Epic; Legacy; MJJ	CD; LP; digital download	
Taiwan	September 18, 2012	Epic; Legacy; MJJ	CD; LP; digital download	
Spain	September 18, 2012	Epic; Legacy; MJJ	CD; LP; digital download	
Canada	September 18, 2012	Epic; Legacy; MJJ	CD; LP; digital download	
Italy	September 18, 2012	Epic; Legacy; MJJ	CD; LP; digital download	
Japan	September 19, 2012	Epic; Legacy; MJJ	CD; LP; digital download	
India	September 27, 2012	Epic; Legacy; MJJ	CD; LP; digital download	
Philippines	September 28, 2012	Epic; Legacy; MJJ	CD; LP; digital download	
China	November 12, 2012	Epic; Legacy; MJJ	CD; LP; digital download	

== Notes ==
^{1} In Australia, Switzerland and the United Kingdom, Bad 25 and Bad are regarded as the same album.
^{2} In the United States, the standard version of Bad 25 is regarded as a re-issue of Bad, but the deluxe edition is counted as a new album.
