= Human Nature (Michael Jackson song) =

1983 song by Michael Jackson

Single by Michael Jackson

from the album Thriller
- B-side: "Baby Be Mine"
- Released: July 4, 1983
- Recorded: 1982
- Studio: Westlake (Los Angeles, California)
- Genre: R&B; quiet storm; soft rock
- Length: 4:06 (album version); 3:47 (single version)
- Label: Epic; CBS
- Songwriters: Steve Porcaro; John Bettis
- Producer: Quincy Jones

Michael Jackson singles chronology
"Wanna Be Startin' Somethin'" (1983)	"Human Nature" (1983)	"P.Y.T. (Pretty Young Thing)" (1983)

Music video
- "Human Nature" on YouTube

Audio sample
- "Human Nature": file; help

"Human Nature" is a song performed by American singer-songwriter Michael Jackson, and it is the fifth single from his sixth solo album, Thriller. The track was produced by Quincy Jones and performed by some band members of Toto with Jackson providing vocals.

It was originally written by keyboardist Steve Porcaro, based on a conversation he had with his young daughter Heather after a boy hit her at school, Porcaro said "he probably likes you and it's human nature". Porcaro, along with some Toto bandmates, had been assisting with the production of Thriller, but he had not intended for "Human Nature" to be used by Jackson. However, Jones inadvertently heard a demo version of the track and thought it would be a great fit for the album. Jones then brought in songwriter John Bettis to rewrite the verses, whose lyrics are about a passerby in New York City. The song would ultimately replace the track "Carousel", which had been already recorded for Thriller.

"Human Nature" was released as a single on July 4, 1983. Like the four Thriller singles before it, the song became a top 10 hit in the US, reaching number seven on the Billboard Hot 100. It also reached number two on the Billboard Adult Contemporary chart and is certified Platinum by the Recording Industry Association of America (RIAA). In Canada and the Netherlands, the single reached number 11. The song was not released as a single in the UK, but it later reached number six on the charts there in 2026 following the release of the biopic Michael. The song garnered positive reviews from music critics. "Human Nature" has been sampled by numerous artists, including Nas with "It Ain't Hard to Tell", and Teddy Riley who remixed SWV's single "Right Here" with a sample of "Human Nature", with the remix reaching number two on the Billboard Hot 100.

== Production ==
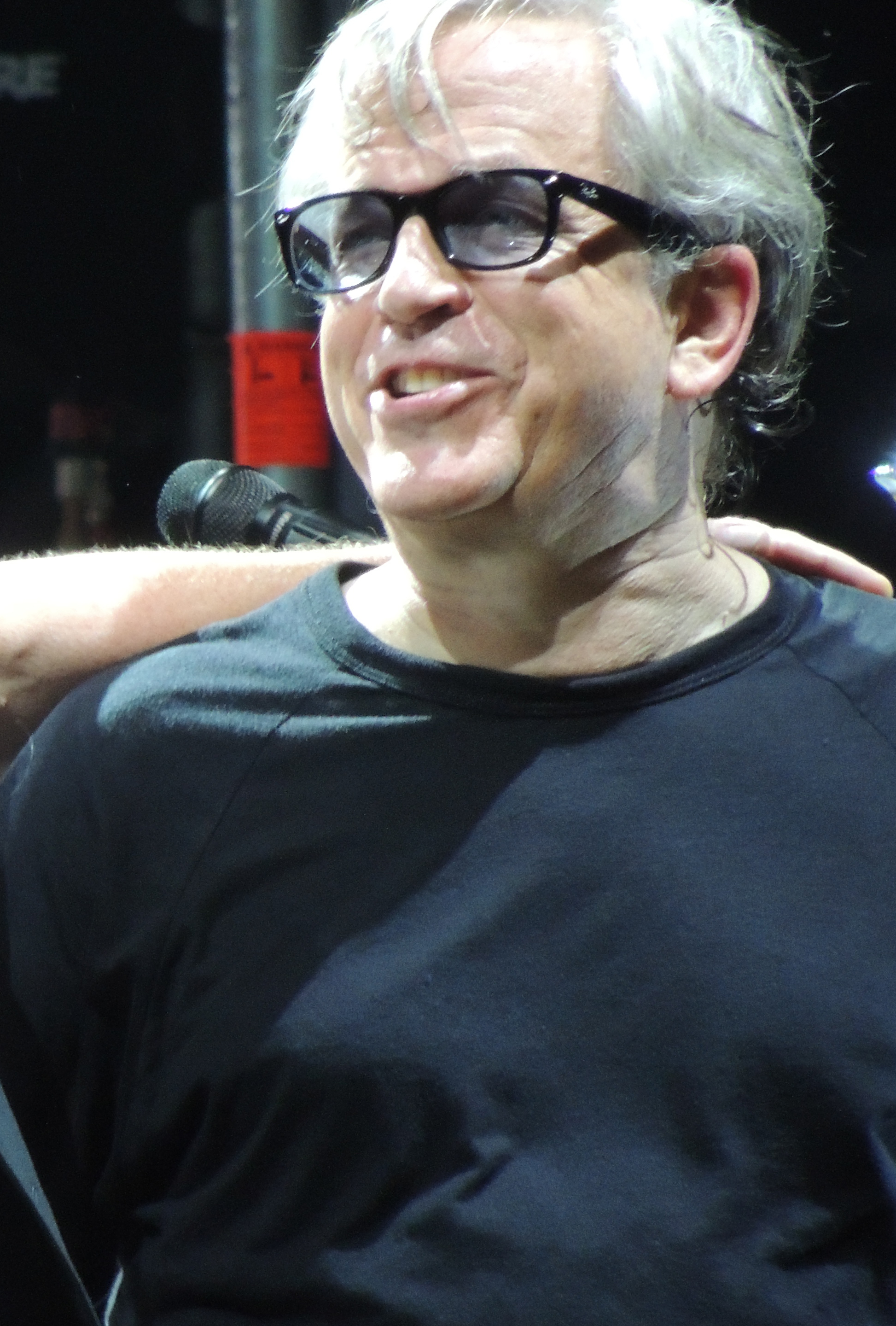
Porcaro in 2013

The first version of "Human Nature" was written and composed by Steve Porcaro of Toto. He wrote the song when his first-grade daughter came home crying after a boy pushed her off the slide. He blurted out three reasons for the incident to comfort her: the boy liked her, people can be strange, and "it's human nature". He recorded a rough demo of the song in his studio while the Toto song "Africa" was being mixed for the single release in October 1982. Fellow Toto keyboardist David Paich added some synthesizer strings on top of the demo. Originally, the song was offered to Toto but they passed on it as they preferred stadium rock-oriented material.

Paich had prepared some demo tracks for producer Quincy Jones to listen to as possible songs for Thriller and asked Porcaro to make Jones a tape with the songs. Running low on cassette tapes, Porcaro used the tape on which he had already recorded his "Human Nature" demo, putting Paich's songs on the reverse side and marking that on the label as the side that Jones should listen to. Jones listened to Paich's songs but did not think they were right for Thriller. However, he did not stop the tape when the songs finished playing, and the cassette deck playing the tape had "auto-reverse" capability, meaning that it started playing the other side as soon as the first side was finished. As Jones described it, "All of a sudden, at the end, there was all this silence, there was: 'why, why, dah dah da-dum dah dah, why, why'. Just a dummy lyric and a very skeletal thing—I get goosebumps talking about it. I said, 'This is where we wanna go, because it's got such a wonderful flavor'". However, Jones was dissatisfied with the original lyrics for the verses and asked John Bettis, who had written lyrics for hits by the Carpenters and the Pointer Sisters, among others, to write new lyrics for the song. He completed the song in two days. Jones asked if the song could be included on Jackson's album, to which Porcaro and Bettis agreed. Porcaro discusses Bettis' input in "Human Nature":

"At the last minute, Quincy (Jones) asked me if I'd mind if John Bettis took a shot at the verse lyrics, and I said, 'No, not at all.' I didn't consider myself a great lyricist. Sometimes what just came out of my mouth when I was writing, I mean like the chorus on "Human Nature" could be keepers. But I was wide open. But with John Bettis, I didn't change a single syllable, he just nailed it. He turned my record into a song, with a beginning, middle and end. Those lyrics are amazing and I don't talk about that enough."

The song, as it turns out, did not change much musically from the demo through to the final album, as Jones liked the song as it was. It was, for the most part, recreated in the studio. Even engineer Bruce Swedien asked Porcaro, who played most of the parts and helped Jackson with the vocal phrasing, to help reproduce the phrasing of the accents of the "Why, why" that can be heard on the demo.

The vocals for the track were recorded at Westlake Recording Studios in Los Angeles after midnight. Michael was asleep on the couch and Quincy Jones was ready to call it a day. Michael suddenly woke up and said he wanted to do the song and recorded it in a single take with no edits or punch-ins.

== Release and reception ==
A template for new jack swing and hip-hop soul ballads, "Human Nature" is comparatively slower and more intimate than Thriller's other songs. "If this town is just an apple, let me take a bite", quivers Jackson's voice over a cascading synthesizer and percolating bass line. Though written by John Bettis and Steve Porcaro of Toto, the lyrics resonate with Jackson's yearning to break free from his tower of celebrity and mingle with young people in a "city that winks its sleepless eye".

— Serena Kim, South Coast Today.

"Human Nature" was released in July 1983, as the fifth single from Thriller. It was not released as a single in the UK. The song achieved chart success in the US. Reaching number two on Billboard's Adult Contemporary chart and number seven on the Hot 100, the song became Jackson's fifth top 10 hit from Thriller. "Human Nature" also charted at number 27 on the Hot Black Singles chart and number 1 on RPM's Canada Adult Contemporary. In the Netherlands, the single reached number 11.

John Rockwell of The New York Times stated that "Human Nature" was a "haunting, brooding ballad" with an "irresistible" chorus. AllMusic said that the "gentle and lovely" "Human Nature" coexisted comfortably with the "tough, scared" "Beat It". They later added that the song was a "soft rocker". Reflecting on Thriller, Slant expressed their fondness of the song, stating that it was "probably the best musical composition on the album and surely one of the only A/C ballads of its era worth remembering". The magazine added that the track's "buttery harmonies" were powerful. Stylus also praised the song, describing it as "the smoothest of ballads". However, they further added that the music "does little to embody the song's message" and that it couches Jackson's "glazed voice" in "bubble synths and drum pillows".

About.com's Bill Lamb looked back on the track 25 years after its release. He felt that the song "set down a blueprint for what would become known as adult R&B". Kelefa Sanneh of Blender described the "soft-serve balladry" of the song as a "silk-sheets masterstroke". In a 2008 IGN review, Todd Gilchrist explained that the elements of "Human Nature" worked better today than they did before. He added that it may be because modern R&B "sucks". Tom Ewing, reviewer for Pitchfork Media, described the song as "meltingly tender", with MTV adding that it was an "airy ballad". Rolling Stone said that the "most beautifully fragile" "Human Nature" was so open and brave it made "She's Out of My Life" seem phony. The Los Angeles Times concluded that it was Jackson's delivery that made the "middling ballad" take off.

In spite of never being released as a single in the UK, "Human Nature" reached number 62 on the charts there in July 2009, following Jackson's death. In May 2026, following the release of the biopic Michael, the song reached a new peak of number six on the UK Singles Chart.

== Live performances ==
The song was first performed during the Jacksons' Victory Tour. Michael started to sing "Ben", but stopped and proceeded to sing "Human Nature". It was also performed during Michael's Bad and Dangerous World Tour. Jackson also performed the song live during his 1996 Royal Brunei concert. It was going to be performed for Jackson's This Is It concerts, which were canceled due to his death; however, it was included on the posthumous album to coincide with the concerts. Live versions of the song are available on the DVDs Live at Wembley July 16, 1988 and Live in Bucharest: The Dangerous Tour. Toto has performed the song in some of their shows, with vocals by Joseph Williams. A live version is available on the 2019 DVD 40 Tours Around the Sun.

== Track listing ==
- 7-inch vinyl
1. "Human Nature" (single version) – 3:47 (Misprinted as 4:05)
2. "Baby Be Mine" – 4:20

== Official remixes ==
1. Album version – 4:06
2. Single version – 3:47
3. Live – 4:29 (This version is taken from Live at Wembley July 16, 1988 and included in the deluxe edition of Bad 25.)
4. "Speechless" / "Human Nature" – 3:18 (Immortal version)

== Personnel ==
Adapted from Thriller liner notes.

Musicians

- Michael Jackson – vocals
- Steve Porcaro – synthesizers, drum machine (Note: Yamaha GS-1, Roland Jupiter-8, Yamaha CS-80, Linn LM-1)
- David Paich – synthesizers (Note: Yamaha CS-80, Sequential Circuits Prophet-5)
- Michael Boddicker – synthesizer (Note: E-mu Emulator)
- Steve Lukather – guitar
- Jeff Porcaro – drum kit
- Paulinho da Costa – percussion (Note: cabasa, claves)

Production

- Steve Porcaro – composition, lyricist, arranger, programming
- John Bettis – lyricist
- Quincy Jones – producer
- Bruce Swedien – recording, mixing
- Matt Forger – technical engineer, additional recording
- Humberto Gatica – additional recording
- Steve Bates – assistant engineer
- Mark Ettel – assistant engineer
- Bernie Grundman – mastering

== Charts ==
=== Weekly charts ===
1983 weekly chart performance for "Human Nature"
Chart (1983)	Peak position
Australia (Kent Music Report)	64
Belgium (Ultratop 50 Flanders)	12
Belgium (VRT Top 30 Flanders)	11
Brazil (ABPD)	5
Canada Top Singles (RPM)	11
Canada Adult Contemporary (RPM)	1
Canada (CHUM)	3
Netherlands (Dutch Top 40)	14
Netherlands (Single Top 100)	11
New Zealand (Recorded Music NZ)	33
US Billboard Hot 100	7
US Adult Contemporary (Billboard)	2
US Hot Black Singles (Billboard)	27
US Cash Box	10
West Germany (GfK)	64

2009 weekly chart performance for "Human Nature"
Chart (2009)	Peak position
Australia (ARIA)	63
Belgium (Back Catalogue Singles Flanders)	12
Canada Hot Digital Singles (Billboard)	27
Denmark (Tracklisten)	39
Italy (FIMI)	29
Netherlands (Single Top 100)	40
Sweden (Sverigetopplistan)	38
Switzerland (Schweizer Hitparade)	46
UK Singles (Official Charts)	62
UK Hip Hop/R&B (Official Charts)	22
US Hot Digital Songs (Billboard)	21

2013 weekly chart performance for "Human Nature"
Chart (2013)	Peak position
France (SNEP)	165

2026 weekly chart performance for "Human Nature"
Chart (2026)	Peak position
Austria (Ö3 Austria Top 40)	48
Canada Hot 100 (Billboard)	48
Colombia Hot 100 (Billboard)	71
Czech Republic Singles Digital (ČNS IFPI)	24
Denmark (Tracklisten)	20
France (SNEP)	36
Germany (GfK)	49
Global 200 (Billboard)	12
Greece International (IFPI)	24
Iceland (Billboard)	7
Ireland (IRMA)	6
Italy (FIMI)	59
Lithuania (AGATA)	58
Luxembourg (Billboard)	20
Middle East and North Africa (IFPI)	16
New Zealand (Recorded Music NZ)	7
Norway (IFPI Norge)	39
Panama Streaming (PRODUCE)	70
Portugal (AFP)	53
Russia Streaming (TopHit)	76
Slovakia Singles Digital (ČNS IFPI)	12
Spain (Promusicae)	84
Sweden (Sverigetopplistan)	17
Switzerland (Schweizer Hitparade)	15
United Arab Emirates (IFPI)	9
UK Singles (Official Charts)	6
UK Hip Hop/R&B (Official Charts)	1
US Hot R&B/Hip-Hop Songs (Billboard)	4

=== Monthly charts ===
Monthly chart performance
Chart (2026)	Peak position
Panama Streaming (PRODUCE)	69
Russia Streaming (TopHit)	76

=== Year-end charts ===
1983 year-end chart performance for "Human Nature"
Chart (1983)	Position
Belgium (Ultratop 50 Flanders)	91
Canada Top Singles (RPM)	90
US Billboard Hot 100	89
US Cash Box	79

== Certifications ==
Certifications for "Human Nature"
Region	Certification	Certified units/sales
Canada (Music Canada)	Platinum	80,000^{‡}
Denmark (IFPI Danmark)	Platinum	90,000^{‡}
Mexico (AMPROFON)	2× Platinum+Gold	150,000^{‡}
New Zealand (RMNZ)	2× Platinum	60,000^{‡}
United Kingdom (BPI)	Platinum	600,000^{‡}
United States (RIAA)	Platinum	1,000,000^{‡}
^{‡} Sales+streaming figures based on certification alone.

== Sampling ==
Songs that have sampled "Human Nature" include:

- "Right Here (Human Nature Remix)" by SWV, a 1993 Teddy Riley-produced remix of the group's 1992 song "Right Here". It spent seven weeks at number one on the Billboard Hot R&B Singles chart. The music video for the remix included clips of Jackson performing on the Dangerous World Tour, including a hologram of the pop singer intercut with wildlife footage from Free Willy, which the song was featured in and on its soundtrack.
- "It Ain't Hard to Tell" (1994) by Nas. Nas has performed "It Ain't Hard to Tell" as a mashup with "Human Nature" using Jackson's original vocals at some concerts.
- "I'm in Heaven" (2003) by Jason Nevins (featuring Holly James) uses an interpolation of the hook from "Human Nature".
- "She Ain't You" (2011) by Chris Brown, from his album F.A.M.E..
- "Don Life" by Big Sean (feat. Lil Wayne), from his album Detroit 2 (2020).

== Other versions ==
"Human Nature" was covered by Miles Davis on his 1985 album You're Under Arrest; at the time Davis also suggested that the song could become a jazz standard. Davis' version earned him a nomination for the Grammy Award for Best Jazz Performance.

Toto has occasionally performed the song as part of a tribute to Jackson and to celebrate the 40th anniversary of the band.

== Bibliography ==
- George, Nelson (2004). Michael Jackson: The Ultimate Collection booklet. Sony BMG.
- Halstead, Craig (2007). Michael Jackson: For the Record. Authors OnLine. ISBN 978-0-7552-0267-6.
- Thriller 25: The Book (2008). Thriller 25: The Book. ML Publishing Group. ISBN 978-0-9768891-9-9.
