= Another Part of Me =

Single by Michael Jackson

from the album Bad
- B-side: "Another Part of Me" (instrumental)
- Released: July 11, 1988
- Recorded: 1984–1986
- Studio: Westlake (studio D), Los Angeles
- Genre: Funk; R&B
- Length: 3:54 (album version); 3:46 (single version); 6:18 (extended dance mix); 4:24 (radio edit)
- Label: Epic
- Songwriter: Michael Jackson
- Producers: Quincy Jones; Michael Jackson (co.)

Michael Jackson singles chronology
"Get It" (1988)	"Another Part of Me" (1988)	"Smooth Criminal" (1988)

Music video
- "Another Part of Me" on YouTube

"Another Part of Me" is a song by American singer and songwriter Michael Jackson. Produced by Quincy Jones (and co-produced by Jackson), it was released as the sixth single on July 11, 1988, for the singer's seventh studio album, Bad (1987). The song was originally featured in Jackson's 1986 3D film Captain EO. It is the sixth song on the album. As with earlier songs in his career such as "Can You Feel It" and "We Are the World", the lyrics emphasize global unity, love and outreach.

The song was featured in the trailer for Jackson's 1988 film Moonwalker, and was featured as a dance attack and level song for the later revisions of Michael Jackson's Moonwalker video game (originally the first revision used excerpts of "Thriller"). The song was also featured in the 1998 movie Rush Hour during a score with Chris Tucker dancing.

In July 2009, a short part of the song was used by singer Madonna as a tribute during the second leg of her Sticky & Sweet Tour. A Jackson impersonator performed his signature moves, while dancing to a medley of Jackson's songs.

== Background ==
According to Quincy Jones in an interview that was featured in the 2001 special edition of Bad, Jackson wanted to include "Streetwalker" on the album instead of "Another Part of Me". However, as Jones said, "Michael liked 'Streetwalker', and I wanted to do 'Another Part of Me'... he wrote both of them, so it didn't make any difference to him... we were going to listen to them, the three of us, objectively and decide which one was gonna get picked. And so [manager Frank] DiLeo was sitting down when 'Streetwalker' was on, and when 'Another Part of Me' came on, he got up with his fat ass, you know, and started [dancing]. I said, 'You're not helping Michael at all!' It was so funny—Michael had a funny name for him, like, 'Rubber... what are you doin' man? You just blew my whole case here!' So DiLeo helped me get 'Another Part' cause he started shaking his butt on it." Bill Bottrell's eventually reworked "Streetwalker" and his version was later released on the 2001 special edition and the second disc of 25th anniversary re-issue. The original 1987 mix of the song remains unreleased, but recordings of it have leaked online.

== Music video ==
An official video was released in 1988, directed by Patrick Kelly, featuring Jackson performing the song live during his Bad World Tour. The film footage was taken on July 14 and 22 at Wembley Stadium and at Rotterdam on June 7 with soundtrack mixed from live multitrack recording taken on July 15 (while the drum multitrack is from July 16), with additional footage from June 27 and 28 shows at Parc des Princes in Paris as well as some footage from Volksparkstadion in Hamburg on July 1 and in Cork on July 30. It is featured on the DVD Michael Jackson's Vision and the Target version DVD of Bad 25. Another version of the video directed by Spike Lee was released on the Bad 25 film in 2012 and featured live film footage from July 14 and July 22, 1988 at the Wembley Stadium, more footage from Volksparkstadion in Hamburg on July 1, a clip from March 5th at the Madison Square Garden in New York City, and some footage from May 4th in Minneapolis.

== Track listing ==
- 7" single
1. "Another Part of Me" (single mix) – 3:46
2. "Another Part of Me" (instrumental) – 3:46
- 12" single / picture disc – CD maxi
1. "Another Part of Me" (extended dance mix) – 6:18
2. "Another Part of Me" (radio edit) – 4:24
3. "Another Part of Me" (dub mix) – 3:51
4. "Another Part of Me" (a cappella) – 4:01
- Promo CD single (United States)
1. "Another Part of Me" (single mix)
2. "Another Part of Me" (extended dance mix)
3. "Another Part of Me" (radio edit)
4. "Another Part of Me" (dub mix)
5. "Another Part of Me" (a cappella)

== Personnel ==
- Written and composed by Michael Jackson
- Produced by Quincy Jones
- Co-produced by Michael Jackson
- Michael Jackson: solo and background vocals
- Paul Jackson, Jr., David Williams: guitars
- Kim Hutchcroft, Larry Williams: saxophones
- Gary Grant, Jerry Hey: trumpets
- Christopher Currell: Synclavier
- John Barnes, Rhett Lawrence: synthesizers
- Rhythm and vocal arrangements by Michael Jackson and John Barnes
- Horn arrangement by Jerry Hey

== Charts ==
=== Weekly charts ===
Chart (1988)	Peak position
Australia (ARIA)	44
Austria (Ö3 Austria Top 40)	20
Belgium (Ultratop 50 Flanders)	3
Belgium (VRT Top 30 Flanders)	3
Canada Top Singles (RPM)	28
Canada Dance/Urban (RPM)	10
Europe (Eurochart Hot 100)	17
Finland (Suomen virallinen singlelista)	3
France (SNEP)	32
Ireland (IRMA)	5
Netherlands (Dutch Top 40)	10
Netherlands (Single Top 100)	8
New Zealand (Recorded Music NZ)	14
Switzerland (Schweizer Hitparade)	5
UK Singles (Official Charts)	15
US Billboard Hot 100	11
US Hot Dance Club Play (Billboard)	18
US Hot Black Singles (Billboard)	1
US Cash Box Top 100	12
US Radio & Records CHR/Pop Airplay Chart	10
West Germany (GfK)	10

Chart (2009)	Peak position
Netherlands (Single Top 100)	94

=== Year-end charts ===
Chart (1988)	Position
Belgium (Ultratop 50 Flanders)	50
