= Don't Be Messin' 'Round =

Song by Michael Jackson

from the album Bad 25
- A-side: "I Just Can't Stop Loving You"
- Released: June 5, 2012
- Recorded: 1982; 1986; 1990–1991; 1994–1995; 2009
- Studio: Hayvenhurst (San Fernando Valley, California); Westlake (West Hollywood, California)
- Genre: Funk; pop; R&B; jazz
- Length: 4:20
- Label: MJJ
- Songwriter: Michael Jackson
- Producer: Michael Jackson

Licensed audio
- "Don't Be Messin' 'Round" on YouTube

"Don't Be Messin' 'Round" is a song by American recording artist and singer Michael Jackson. The song was originally recorded in 1986 during initial recording sessions for Jackson's seventh studio album, Bad, but was never finished and was left off the album. Jackson reportedly revisited the track for his eighth and ninth studio albums, and again in 2009. In May 2012, it was announced that Jackson's original 1986 demo for "Don't Be Messin' 'Round" was to be included on a re-release of the original first single from Bad, "I Just Can't Stop Loving You". This release marked the beginning of the promotional campaign for Bad 25, a twenty-fifth-anniversary re-release of the Bad album. As of 2020, the Thriller-era demo has been leaked under the name "Korgnex remix".

== Background and release ==
Michael Jackson wrote and recorded "Don't Be Messin' 'Round" at some point during recording sessions for his sixth studio album, Thriller. However, due to an overflow of new material at the time, Jackson pushed the song aside for his next album. Years later, in 1986, Jackson revisited the track with longtime collaborators Matt Forger and Bill Bottrell at the Laboratory, the nickname for Jackson's renovated Hayvenhurst recording studio. According to Forger, the original demo for "Don't Be Messin' 'Round" was nearly eight minutes long, leading to Jackson "brutally" cutting it down to its current 4:20 length. Jackson continued to work on the track throughout 1986 both at Hayvenhurst and Westlake Recording Studios; however, once album producer Quincy Jones began working with Jackson, the track was abandoned. Jackson reportedly revisited the song during sessions for both his Dangerous and HIStory: Past, Present and Future, Book I albums, as well as another revisit in early 2009, but passed on it numerous times.

In early April 2012, unauthorized pre-sales for the "I Just Can't Stop Loving You" CD single began online, prematurely leaking news of the upcoming release of "Don't Be Messin' 'Round". Later in May 2012, the Estate of Michael Jackson issued a statement officially announcing the song's release. The released version is a new mix done by Forger, which he made from combining elements recorded on across multiple different multitrack tapes in attempt to best represent the Bad-era version of the track.

In 2020, the Thriller-era demo was leaked under the title, Korgnex Mix and was often speculated by fans to be a demo from the Dangerous sessions. In 2026, an alternate instrumental version of the track with backing vocals leaked. The date of the alternate instrumental is unknown.

== Composition ==
"Don't Be Messin' 'Round" is a funk and R&B-influenced track, along with flavors of jazz and pop, that lasts for four minutes and 20 seconds. The song incorporates cowbells and thick snares into its beat, along with plucking guitars. Because the song is a demo, Jackson often mumbles through sections rather than singing actual lyrics, making an accurate translation of the lyrics difficult. The song opens with Jackson playing chords on an acoustic piano, after which he sings, "Are you ready for a real good time, my love?/Are you ready for a real good treat?/There'll be so much dancing, singing/Ah, you came falling into me." As the chorus follows, Jackson repeats "So don't be messin' 'round, don't be messin' 'round" in a soft falsetto register. The instrumentation infuses digital drum snares over cowbells and shakers. Jackson fans often noted similarities between "Don't Be Messin' 'Round" and "Streetwalker", another Bad outtake. It has also been compared to various Stevie Wonder songs.

== Critical reception ==
Ray Rahman was proud of the song, highlighting it and praising it: "Noticeably unfinished (refreshingly so, given Bad 25's hermetic polish) numbers like rhythmic earworm 'Don't Be Messin' Around'." The Morton Report felt more mixed: "It [album] kicks off with the mid-tempo, piano-driven 'Don't Be Messin' 'Round'. Too bad he didn't finish this one off, it would've made a far better duet vehicle for him and Stevie Wonder." Evan Sawdey called this song "feel-good".

== Track listing ==
- CD single (88725414922)
1. "I Just Can't Stop Loving You" (album version) – 4:23
2. "Don't Be Messin' 'Round" (demo) – 4:19

== Release history ==
Release history and formats for "Don't Be Messin' 'Round"
Country	Date	Format
Germany	June 1, 2012	CD single
France	June 4, 2012	CD single
United States	June 5, 2012	CD single
Japan	June 6, 2012	CD single
Austria	June 8, 2012	CD single
United Kingdom	June 12, 2012	CD single

== See also ==
- List of unreleased songs recorded by Michael Jackson
- Death of Michael Jackson
- List of music released posthumously
