= Working Day and Night =

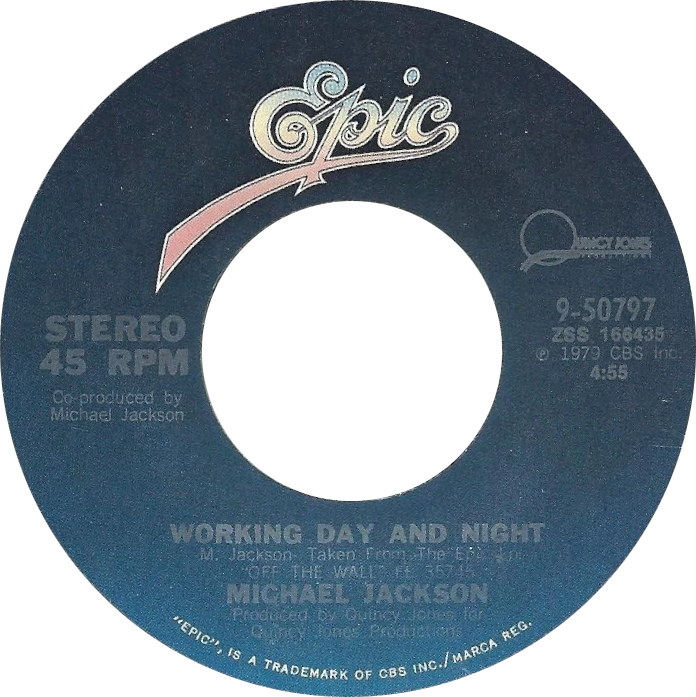
- Side B of the "Rock with You" US single

Song by Michael Jackson

from the album Off the Wall
- A-side: "Rock with You"
- Released: August 10, 1979
- Recorded: December 1978
- Genre: Disco; funk
- Length: 5:12
- Label: Epic
- Songwriter: Michael Jackson
- Producers: Quincy Jones; Michael Jackson

Licensed audio
- "Working Day and Night" on YouTube

"Working Day and Night" is a song by the American recording artist Michael Jackson. It is the third track from his fifth studio album, Off the Wall (1979). The song was written by Jackson and produced by Quincy Jones, with Jackson in the role of co-producer. Despite not being released as a single, Jackson performed the song live for his first two solo tours. It is also featured on the video game Michael Jackson: The Experience. The song has been sampled by several artists. It was remixed and released on the remix/soundtrack album, Immortal, in 2011. In 2014, producer Timbaland sampled percussion and breaths from the song in the duet version of "Love Never Felt So Good" (with Justin Timberlake); the duet was released as a single from Xscape.

== Background ==
"Working Day and Night" was written by Michael Jackson and recorded for his studio album Off the Wall issued in August 1979. This song was released the B-side for "Rock with You" in the US, and B-side for "Off the Wall" in the UK. The song has a tempo of 128 beats per minute, making it one of Jackson's fastest songs.

== Live performances ==
"Working Day and Night" was performed by the Jacksons on the Triumph Tour in 1981 and Victory Tour in 1984. The song was performed live on Jackson's Bad World Tour during 1987–1989, and the first two legs of the Dangerous World Tour in 1992. The song was rehearsed for the third leg of the tour in 1993, but was ultimately removed from the setlist.

A live version, recorded at one of the Jacksons' 1981 Madison Square Garden concerts, was included on live album, The Jacksons Live!, later edited and released as the album's second single in November 1981. Record World said that "An energetic bass riff transports the exciting vocal interaction, while horn spice gives added radio appeal." In 2001, the original demo recording of the song was released as a bonus track on the expanded, special edition of Off the Wall. The live performance video at Jackson's Dangerous World Tour in Bucharest, Romania on October 1, 1992, was featured on the DVD in his box set The Ultimate Collection in 2004, and a live concert DVD, Live in Bucharest: The Dangerous Tour, in 2005. In 2012, a live audio and video version of the song performed during the Bad World Tour was released on the deluxe edition of Bad 25 and the concert DVD Live at Wembley July 16, 1988. The song was remixed and released on the soundtrack to Cirque du Soleil's Michael Jackson: The Immortal World Tour, Immortal, in 2011. The song has also been used for the Michael Jackson: One production.

== Personnel ==
- Written and composed by Michael Jackson
- Produced by Quincy Jones
- Co-produced by Michael Jackson
- Recorded and mixed by Bruce Swedien
- Lead and background vocals: Michael Jackson
- Bass guitar: Louis Johnson
- Drums: John Robinson
- Guitars: David Williams and Phil Upchurch
- Acoustic and Rhodes pianos, synthesizer: Greg Phillinganes
- Percussion: Paulinho Da Costa, John Robinson and Michael Jackson
- Horns arranged by Jerry Hey and performed by the Seawind Horns:
  - Trumpet and flugelhorn: Jerry Hey
  - Tenor, alto saxophones and flute: Larry Williams
  - Baritone, tenor saxophones and flute: Kim Hutchcroft
  - Trombone: William Reichenbach
  - Trumpet: Gary Grant
- Rhythm arrangements by Greg Phillinganes and Michael Jackson
- Vocal and percussion arrangements by Michael Jackson

== Official versions ==
- Album version – 5:12
- Original demo from 1978 – 4:10
- Immortal version – 3:36
- Live at Triumph Tour (The Jacksons) – 6:53
- Live at Wembley July 16, 1988 (from the Bad World Tour, available on the deluxe edition of Bad 25) – 5:55

== Covers and samples ==
- In 1983, George Duke sampled the song for the "Overture" of the album Guardian of the Light.
- In 1999, Will Smith sampled the song on his track "Can You Feel Me" for his album Willennium.
- In 1989, Richie Rich sampled the song for his single "Salsa House", from the album I Can Make You Dance.
- In 2009, Jackson's sister Janet Jackson sampled the song for her single "Make Me" from her greatest hits album Number Ones.
- In 2014, Timbaland sampled percussion and breaths from the song for the duet version of Jackson's posthumous song "Love Never Felt So Good", which features American recording artist Justin Timberlake for the record Xscape.
