= Baby Be Mine (Michael Jackson song) =

1982 song by Michael Jackson

Song by Michael Jackson

from the album Thriller
- A-side: "Human Nature"
- Released: November 29, 1982
- Recorded: 1982
- Studio: Westlake (Los Angeles, California)
- Genre: Post-disco; funk; quiet storm
- Length: 4:20
- Label: Epic; CBS
- Songwriter: Rod Temperton
- Producer: Quincy Jones

Audio sample
- file; help

"Baby Be Mine" is a song by the American singer Michael Jackson, released on Jackson's 1982 album Thriller. It was written by Rod Temperton and produced by Quincy Jones.

"Baby Be Mine" was one of only two Thriller songs not released as an A-side single. It was released song as the B-side for the Thriller single "Human Nature (1983) and for "I Just Can't Stop Loving You" (1987) from Jackson's next album, Bad.

== Background ==
In a conversation with publication Vulture that was later adapted into a Time retrospective on Thriller, Jones mentioned the record paid homage to jazz saxophonist John Coltrane. Jones said that "Baby Be Mine" was "the best example of me trying to feed the musical principles of the past — I'm talking about bebop." "Getting the young kids to hear bebop is what I'm talking about," he said. "Jazz is at the top of the hierarchy of music because the musicians learned everything they could about music." Billboard described the song as "...upbeat, danceable and punctuated by twittering keyboards and punchy horn fills."

== Critical reception ==
In a 2016 retrospective for Billboard, writer Andrew Unterberger lauded the song (and Thriller′s other non-single, "The Lady in My Life") as "earn[ing] every bit of the real estate they command on the biggest nine-track album in history." In a five-star retrospective review of Thriller, Slant Magazine lauded the song for being a "lush disco paradise." On a Billboard 2022 ranked list of the entire album, the song placed eighth, with writer Chuck Arnold noting the record "shimmers with a soul-disco swag" before highlighting the "smooth, roller-skating groove that the late Heatwave honcho [also] brought to "Rock with You" on Off the Wall."

In a more negative review, Pitchfork thought the song caused the momentum built from opening track "Wanna Be Startin' Somethin'" to fade. "['Wanna Be Startin' Somethin''] holds up for six minutes and two seconds, during which Jackson and Quincy Jones mix the tension of rock'n'roll with the rapture of disco and hit perfection. But then you get "Baby Be Mine"—one of the original tracks that wasn't a single—and the momentum fades: On the heels of "Wanna Be Startin' Somethin'", it should maintain the temperature; instead, it goes nowhere, starts nothing."

== Personnel ==
Personnel as listed in the album's liner notes are:

- Songwriting by Rod Temperton
- Production by Quincy Jones
- Mastering by Bernie Grundman
- David Williams: guitar
- Larry Williams: saxophone, flute
- Bill Reichenbach Jr.: trombone
- Jerry Hey and Gary Grant: horn arrangement, trumpet, flugelhorn
- Leon "Ndugu" Chancler: drums
- Greg Phillinganes: keyboards, synthesizer
- Michael Boddicker & David Paich: synthesizer
- Steve Porcaro, Brian Banks and Anthony Marinelli: synthesizer programming
- Ryan Forger: engineer
