= Bill Frank Whitten =

American fashion designer

- Born: October 4, 1944; Bessemer, Alabama, U.S.
- Died: April 8, 2006 (aged 61); Los Angeles, California, U.S.
- Occupations: Fashion designer; Сostume designer
- Relatives: Jack Whitten (brother)

Bill Frank Whitten (October 4, 1944 – April 8, 2006) was a Hollywood fashion designer who designed stage clothing and high-end fashion for musicians and celebrities.

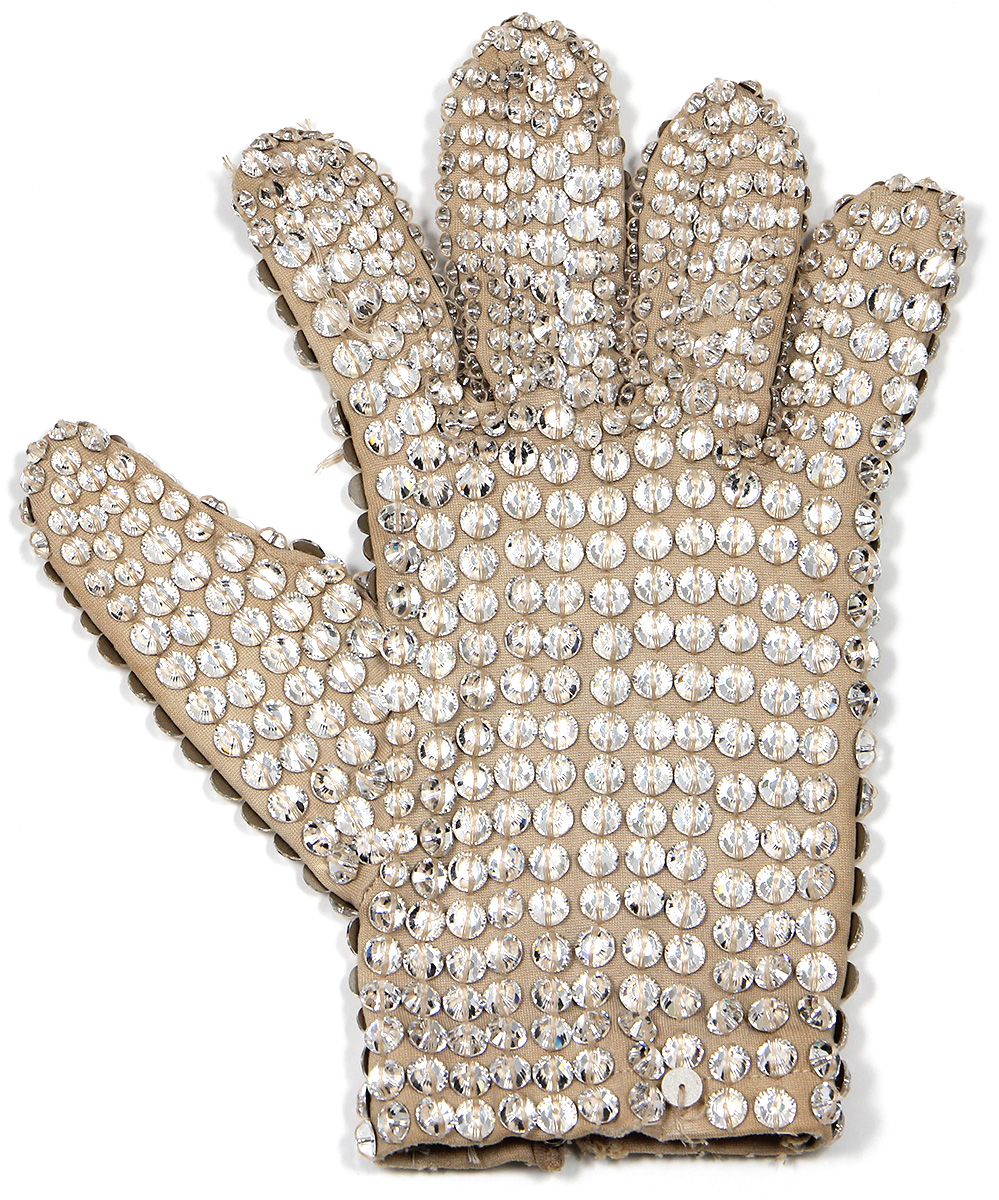
Glove used by Michael Jackson during the 1984 Victory Tour.

In 1974, Whitten's custom shirt business in West Hollywood, Workroom 27, was discovered by Neil Diamond who became an advocate for Whitten's custom-designed clothing. At the height of his business, Whitten had a factory with 50 employees making stage clothing for 20 groups including the Commodores, The Jacksons, and Edgar Winter. He also designed Michael Jackson's famous rhinestone glove and crystal-encrusted socks. In 1990, he opened a store, Bill Whitten, on Melrose Avenue.

Whitten died of cancer on April 8, 2006. He is the brother of artist Jack Whitten.

== Legacy ==
Whitten's highly beaded and crystal-set performance pieces remained culturally resonant decades later. In 2019, a pair of crystal-encrusted "moonwalking" socks associated with Michael Jackson and attributed to Whitten's atelier drew international auction headlines, underscoring continuing interest in his stagecraft. In 2025, Levi Strauss & Co. announced that its archives had acquired an early-1970s patchwork denim tuxedo suit Whitten created for Elton John, documenting Whitten’s experimentation with denim alongside his signature embellishment techniques.
