= Price of Fame (Michael Jackson song) =

Song by Michael Jackson

from the album Bad 25
- Released: September 18, 2012
- Recorded: 1986
- Studio: Hayvenhurst (Encino, Los Angeles)
- Genre: Pop; R&B
- Length: 4:33
- Label: Epic; Legacy
- Songwriter: Michael Jackson
- Producer: Michael Jackson

Licensed audio
- "Price of Fame" on YouTube

"Price of Fame" is a song by the American recording artist Michael Jackson. It was originally planned to be the theme for a Pepsi commercial but was replaced by an edited version of "Bad". It was released on the Bad 25 album. Later, the Pepsi version was leaked online in 2015.

== Background and recording ==
"Price of Fame" was mixed by Bill Bottrell with assistance from Matt Forger. Bottrell's mix was later released on the Bad 25 album along with other demo tracks.

== Critical reception ==
Joseph Vogel, who has written two books about Jackson, described the opening as reminiscent of the Police song "Spirits in the Material World". He also compared the verses to "Billie Jean" and the chords to "Who Is It". He praised the vocal performance as "powerful" and said "listen to the way he bites into the lyric: 'My father never lies!'", and contrasted the song to the "easy bliss" of "Free", the previous track.

== See also ==
- List of unreleased songs recorded by Michael Jackson
- Death of Michael Jackson
- List of music released posthumously
