= I'm So Blue (Michael Jackson song) =

Promotional single by Michael Jackson

from the album Bad 25
- Released: October 1, 2012
- Recorded: 1986
- Genre: Pop; soul
- Length: 4:06
- Label: MJJ
- Songwriter: Michael Jackson
- Producer: Michael Jackson

Michael Jackson singles chronology
"Bad (Afrojack Remix) [DJ Buddha Edit]" (2012)	"I'm So Blue" (2012)	"Love Never Felt So Good" (2014)

Licensed audio
- "I'm So Blue" on YouTube

"I'm So Blue" is a song by American singer and recording artist Michael Jackson. The song was originally recorded in 1986 during initial recording sessions for Jackson's seventh studio album, Bad, but was never finished and was left off the album. The song was later included on Bad 25, a twenty-fifth anniversary re-release of the Bad album.

== Lyrics ==
The lyrics of the song describes a lover who discusses his former love and feeling that it gives him when reflecting on the relationship.

== Release ==
"I'm So Blue" was released on October 1, 2012 on the Italian radio stations, and was also released to some Polish stations in December that year.

== See also ==
- List of unreleased songs recorded by Michael Jackson
- Death of Michael Jackson
- List of music released posthumously
