= I Just Can't Stop Loving You =

1987 single by Michael Jackson

Single by Michael Jackson featuring Siedah Garrett

from the album Bad
- B-side: "Baby Be Mine"
- Released: July 20, 1987
- Recorded: May 1987
- Genre: R&B
- Length: 4:25 (album version); 4:17 (7" w/ spoken intro); 4:12 (7" w/o spoken intro)
- Label: Epic; CBS
- Songwriter: Michael Jackson
- Producers: Quincy Jones; Michael Jackson (co.)

Michael Jackson singles chronology
"Girl You're So Together" (1984)	"I Just Can't Stop Loving You" (1987)	"Bad" (1987)

Siedah Garrett singles chronology
"Do You Want It Right Now" (1985)	"I Just Can't Stop Loving You" (1987)	"Everchanging Times" (1987)

Official audio
- "I Just Can't Stop Loving You" on YouTube

Audio sample
- "I Just Can't Stop Loving You": file; help

"I Just Can't Stop Loving You" is a 1987 duet ballad by American singer Michael Jackson featuring singer and songwriter Siedah Garrett, and was released as the first single on July 20, 1987, by Epic Records from his seventh album, Bad. The song was written by Jackson, and co-produced by Jackson and Quincy Jones. The presence of Garrett on the track was a last-minute decision by Jackson and Jones, after Jackson's first two choices for the duet both decided against participating. Garrett, a protégé of Jones who co-wrote another song on Bad, "Man in the Mirror", was unaware that she would be singing the song until the day of the recording session. It became her first hit since Dennis Edwards' 1984 song "Don't Look Any Further". Garrett remains known primarily for her work with Jackson to this day.

"I Just Can't Stop Loving You" reached number one on the Billboard Hot 100, R&B Singles and Adult Contemporary charts, making it the first in a string of 5 number-one singles from Bad. It was Jackson's second number-one song on the Adult Contemporary chart after "The Girl Is Mine" with Paul McCartney. "I Just Can't Stop Loving You" was released without an accompanying music video. Jackson and Garrett later recorded "Todo Mi Amor Eres Tú" (loosely translated to "All My Love Is You"), a Spanish-language version of the song, with lyrics translated by Rubén Blades, and "Je Ne Veux Pas La Fin De Nous" (loosely translated to "I Don't Want the End of Us"), a French-language version, with translation by Christine "Coco" Decroix. All three versions are featured on the 2012 reissue album Bad 25. The original English-language version was re-released as a single in 2012, as part of the Bad 25 release.

== Background, writing and recording ==
For the duet ballad "I Just Can't Stop Loving You", Michael Jackson wanted to share vocals with Barbra Streisand or Whitney Houston. Streisand passed on the invitation because she had concerns about their large age difference (16 years), and thought the song's lyrics would be unbelievable for her and Jackson to sing together. Houston's label, Arista Records, thought that, if she performed on the song, it might detract from the promotion of her sophomore album, Whitney. Ultimately, a different singer duetted with Jackson on "I Just Can't Stop Loving You": Siedah Garrett, who co-wrote another one of Jackson's ballads called "Man in the Mirror" and performed backing vocals on it. Garrett had previously duetted on former Temptations member Dennis Edwards' "Don't Look Any Further". Garrett first came to the attention of producer Quincy Jones after auditioning for and winning a spot in the group Deco. She later signed as a recording artist with Jones' Warner Bros.-distributed Qwest Records. The singer was constantly sent song demos including one for "I Just Can't Stop Loving You", though she did not know that the demo was a song written and sung by Jackson. While reporting for a recording session, Garrett thought that she was summoned to do overdubs for "Man in the Mirror". Instead she was surprised to learn that she'd been chosen to sing a duet with Jackson.

The original album version of the song opened with Jackson cooing a spoken part backed by a longer version of the synth intro. According to Jackson, he recorded that part of the song while lying in bed. The intro went, in part, "I just want to lay next to you for a while. You look so beautiful tonight... A lot of people misunderstand me. That's because they don't know me at all. I just want to touch you and hold you..." This intro was mixed out on the 7" single, on future releases of Bad and on most compilation albums. An alternate version of the single, featuring the original mastered album version mix with the spoken word intro for "I Just Can't Stop Loving You" backed by the album outtake "Don't Be Messin' 'Round", was released in select Walmart stores in 2012 to mark the release of Bad 25.

Sheet music for "I Just Can't Stop Loving You" sets the key of C major (C Mixolydian) with a tempo of 100 beats per minute. To some, it was reminiscent of Jackson's Motown classic "Got to Be There".

== Critical reception ==
Richard Cromelin from the Los Angeles Times was negative with the song, and particularly the spoken word opening, writing: "The soliloquy is meant to be revealing, tender and vulnerable, but with his quivering timbre and the haunting music behind, it comes off a little creepy, like Norman Bates gearing up for "Psycho IV'." Davitt Sigerson from Rolling Stone wrote a review about the song, commenting:

"Churls may bemoan 'I Just Can't Stop Loving You,' Jackson's duet with the often indistinguishable Siedah Garrett, as a second unworthy entry. Without descending to musical McCarthyism and questioning the honor of anyone who can fault a record with both finger snaps and timpani, it need only be asked, Who, having heard the song at least twice, can fail to remember that chorus?"

== Chart performance ==
"I Just Can't Stop Loving You" was the lead single from Jackson's much-anticipated Bad album. The single debuted on the U.S. Billboard Hot 100 singles chart at #37, the week of August 8, 1987. The single was the highest debuting single of 1987, and quickly traveled to the top quarter of the Hot 100, advancing to #16 in its second week, and soaring to #1 in its seventh week on the tally, the week of September 19, 1987.

Despite the success, the duet had a relatively short chart run and fell out of the top 40 just five weeks after topping the chart, spending a total of 11 weeks in the top 40, out of a total of 14 weeks on the Hot 100. This was perhaps due to the quick release of the album title track as the second single (it debuted on the Hot 100 at #40 in the same week that "I Just Can't Stop Loving You" hit number one). Billboard ranked it as #43 on the year-end Hot 100 chart for 1987.

The track spent three weeks at number one on Billboard's Adult Contemporary singles chart, becoming the second and last Michael Jackson single to top that chart.

In the United Kingdom, the song peaked at the top of the UK Singles Chart on August 9, 1987—for the week ending date August 15, 1987—and remained at the top for two consecutive weeks until it was dethroned by "Never Gonna Give You Up" by Rick Astley. "I Just Can't Stop Loving You" became Britain's 30th best-selling song of 1987. However, this song was not played on Top Of The Pops when it reached No.1, as there was no promo video for it.

In his autobiography, Moonwalk, Jackson stated the song was not written with someone in mind, but that he had been thinking of someone when singing the song live.

== Live performances ==
Jackson performed the song on his Bad world tour (1987–1989) with backing singer Sheryl Crow, and on his Dangerous World Tour (1992–1993) with Siedah Garrett. He also performed the song at the Royal Concert in Brunei in July 1996 with Marva Hicks. Live versions of the song are available on the DVDs Live at Wembley July 16, 1988 and Live in Bucharest: The Dangerous Tour. The song would always abruptly stop starting from the Bad tour's 2nd leg to transition to "She's Out of My Life."

Jackson would have performed it on This Is It with Judith Hill, but the concert series was canceled due to his sudden death. However, this is a featured song in the movie Michael Jackson's This Is It. As a tribute to Jackson, Hill recorded and released a "sequel" to the song, entitled "I Will Always Be Missing You".

== Releases ==
- CD promo
1. "I Just Can't Stop Loving You" (7" version) – 4:12
- US 7" single
1. "I Just Can't Stop Loving You" (with spoken intro) – 4:17
2. "Baby Be Mine" – 4:20
- US 12" special edition single
1. "Todo Mi Amor Eres Tu" – 4:06
2. "I Just Can't Stop Loving You" (7" version) – 4:12
- US 3" CD single
1. "I Just Can't Stop Loving You" (7" version) – 4:12
2. "Baby Be Mine" – 4:20

== Mixes ==
1. Album version / Original album mix* – 4:25
2. 7" version – 4:12 *This version replaced the original version on the later releases of Bad
3. "Todo mi amor eres tú" Spanish version – 4:06 (which means "You Are All My Love")
4. "Je ne veux pas la fin de nous" French version – 4:06 (which means "I Don't Want the End of Us")
5. Live version from Live in Bucharest: The Dangerous Tour
6. Live version from Live at Wembley July 16, 1988, included in the deluxe edition of Bad 25 – 4:25
7. Live version from Yokohama Stadium, included on the Wembley DVD
8. "You Are Not Alone"/"I Just Can't Stop Loving You," remix included on Immortal – 6:08

== Personnel ==
- Michael Jackson – lead and backing vocals
- Siedah Garrett – lead and backing vocals, shaker
- John Barnes – piano, vocal arrangements
- David Paich – keyboards, synthesizer
- Greg Phillinganes – synthesizer
- Steve Porcaro – synthesizer programming
- Christopher Currell – Synclavier
- Dann Huff – guitar
- Nathan East – bass
- N'dugu Chancler – drums
- Paulinho da Costa – percussion

== 2012 reissue ==
"I Just Can't Stop Loving You"

Single by Michael Jackson featuring Siedah Garrett

from the album Bad 25
- B-side: "Baby Be Mine"; "Don't Be Messin' 'Round"
- Released: June 1, 2012
- Recorded: May 1987
- Length: 4:25
- Label: Epic

Michael Jackson featuring Siedah Garrett singles chronology
"Immortal Megamix: Can You Feel It/Don't Stop 'Til You Get Enough/Billie Jean/Black or White (Immortal Version)" (2011)	"I Just Can't Stop Loving You" (2012)	"Bad (Afrojack Remix) [DJ Buddha Edit]" (2012)

On June 5, 2012, to celebrate the 25th anniversary of Jackson's Bad album (on which "I Just Can't Stop Loving You" appears), the single was re-released to Walmart stores in the United States, but was denied a digital release. The single included the original 1987 edit of "I Just Can't Stop Loving You", which included the spoken word intro that was removed from current versions of the Bad album, as well as "Don't Be Messin' 'Round", an untouched demo that was recorded for the album in 1986. On Billboard's Hot Singles Sales Chart, which ranks the best-selling physical singles of the week, "I Just Can't Stop Loving You" debuted at no. 1 with 5,000 copies sold. This gave Jackson his first no. 1 single on a Billboard chart since 2003, when "One More Chance" spent three weeks atop the Hot R&B/Hip Hop Singles Sales Chart. The vinyl single was released in USA on June 26, 2012.

=== Track listing ===
- CD single (88725414922)
1. "I Just Can't Stop Loving You" (album version) – 4:25
2. "Don't Be Messin' 'Round" (demo) – 4:19
- 7" single
1. "I Just Can't Stop Loving You" (with spoken intro) – 4:17
2. "Baby Be Mine" – 4:20

=== Release history ===
Country	Date	Format
Germany	June 1, 2012	CD single
France	June 4, 2012	CD single
United States	June 5, 2012	CD single
Japan	June 6, 2012	CD single
Austria	June 8, 2012	CD single
United Kingdom	June 12, 2012	CD single

== Covers ==
- In 1988, American pianist David Benoit included a version of the song on his album, Every Step of the Way.
- In 2001, Gloria Estefan & James Ingram performed the song in Michael Jackson: 30th Anniversary Special.
- Contemporary jazz guitarist Chuck Loeb presented his rendition from his 1987 album "My Shining Hour."
- In 2009, the top 8 finalists of Latin American Idol performed the Spanish version "Todo mi amor eres tú", directed by Jon Secada as a tribute to Michael Jackson.
- In 2012, Rachel Berry (Lea Michele) and Finn Hudson (Cory Monteith) performed the song in the Glee Michael Jackson tribute episode.
- In 2012, Italian jazz trumpeter Enrico Rava released a version on his tribute album Rava on the Dance Floor.
- In 2013, Toby Love covered the Spanish version of the song in bachata as the second single from his album Amor Total. His version reached number one on the Billboard Tropical Songs chart and in the Dominican Republic. Love's cover led to Rubén Blades receiving the ASCAP Latin Award on the Tropical category in 2014.

== Charts ==
=== Weekly charts ===
Weekly chart performance for "I Just Can't Stop Loving You"
Chart (1987)	Peak position
Australia (Kent Music Report)	10
Austria (Ö3 Austria Top 40)	5
Belgium (Ultratop 50 Flanders)	1
Bolivia (UPI)	7
Canada Top Singles (RPM)	2
Canada Adult Contemporary (RPM)	1
Denmark (IFPI)	1
Europe (European Hot 100 Singles)	1
Finland (Suomen virallinen lista)	3
France (SNEP)	12
Hungary (MAHASZ)	6
Ireland (IRMA)	1
Italy Airplay (Music & Media)	2
Japan (Oricon)	39
Japan (Japan Hot 100)	94
Netherlands (Dutch Top 40)	1
Netherlands (Single Top 100)	1
New Zealand (Recorded Music NZ)	3
Norway (VG-lista)	1
Paraguay (UPI)	4
South Africa (Springbok Radio)	7
Spain (PROMUSICAE)	1
Sweden (Sverigetopplistan)	4
Switzerland (Schweizer Hitparade)	2
UK Singles (OCC)	1
US Billboard Hot 100	1
US Hot Adult Contemporary (Billboard)	1
US Hot Latin Songs (Billboard)	11
US Hot R&B/Hip-Hop Songs (Billboard)	1
US Contemporary Hit Radio (Radio & Records)	1
West Germany (GfK)	2

=== Year-end charts ===
1987 year-end chart performance for "I Just Can't Stop Loving You"
Chart (1987)	Position
Australia (Australian Music Report)	97
Canada Top Singles (RPM)	33
Netherlands (Single Top 100)	75
Italy (Musica e dischi)	10
New Zealand (RIANZ)	29
UK Singles (OCC)	30
US Billboard Hot 100	45
US Adult Contemporary (Billboard)	16
US Hot Crossover Singles (Billboard)	24
West Germany (Media Control)	26

2009 year-end chart performance for "I Just Can't Stop Loving You"
Chart (2009)	Position
UK Singles (OCC)	78

2012 year-end chart performance for "I Just Can't Stop Loving You"
Chart (2012)	Position
France (SNEP)	64

== Certifications ==
Certifications and sales for "I Just Can't Stop Loving You"
Region	Certification	Certified units/sales
Canada (Music Canada)	Gold	40,000^{‡}
Denmark (IFPI Danmark)	Gold	45,000^{‡}
New Zealand (RMNZ)	Gold	15,000^{‡}
United Kingdom (BPI)	Gold	464,000
United States (RIAA)	Gold	1,000,000^{^}
^{^} Shipments figures based on certification alone.^{‡} Sales+streaming figures based on certification alone.
