= Man in the Mirror =

Single by Michael Jackson

from the album Bad
- B-side: "Man in the Mirror" (instrumental)
- Released: January 16, 1988
- Recorded: May 1987
- Studio: Westlake (studio D), Los Angeles
- Genre: Pop; gospel
- Length: 5:19 (album version); 5:04 (7" single mix)
- Label: Epic
- Songwriters: Siedah Garrett; Glen Ballard
- Producers: Quincy Jones; Michael Jackson (co.)

Michael Jackson singles chronology
"The Way You Make Me Feel" (1987)	"Man in the Mirror" (1988)	"Dirty Diana" (1988)

Music video
- "Man in the Mirror" on YouTube

"Man in the Mirror" is a song by American singer Michael Jackson. It was written by Glen Ballard and Siedah Garrett and produced by Jackson and Quincy Jones. It was released in January 1988 as the fourth single from Jackson's seventh solo album, Bad (1987). The video consists of a montage of historical events and figures.

In the US, "Man in the Mirror" became Jackson's ninth number-one single on the Billboard Hot 100 and was certified triple platinum. It was nominated for Record of the Year at the 31st Grammy Awards. It reached number 21 on the UK singles chart in 1988 and number 2 following Jackson's death in 2009. An instrumental version was played at Jackson's memorial service.

== Writing and recording ==
"Man in the Mirror" was written by Glen Ballard and Siedah Garrett. Jackson's producer, Quincy Jones, invited Garrett to his home with a group of other songwriters and asked them to write material for Jackson's next album. Garrett recalled that Jones told the group: "I just want hits, that's all I want."

Garrett took the brief to Ballard, her writing partner, who began playing a keyboard figure; Garrett wrote the lyrics. The two recorded a demo over the course of a week, with Garrett on vocals. Garrett delivered the tape to Jones, who called back a few hours later to tell her he approved. At Jackson's request, Garrett and Ballard wrote a longer middle eight and modified the lyrics. Jones enlisted the Andraé Crouch Choir to record gospel vocals.

The song runs for 5 minutes and 19 seconds and the sheet music for the song shows the key of G major. After 2 minutes and 53 seconds, the key goes up a semitone, changing to A-flat major.

== Critical response ==
Ed Hogan of AllMusic called it "gentle". Rolling Stone's Davitt Sigerson thought it was one of Jackson's greatest works: "On 'Man in the Mirror,' a song he did not write, Jackson goes a step further and offers a straightforward homily of personal commitment". Jon Pareles of The New York Times called it a "catchy, uplifting piece of pop-gospel". He said that it was "pseudopolitical ... an old phenomenon that has gone big time in the 1980s. Performers now love the moral high ground, and their listeners like to think they're filled with high-minded compassion."

In 2009, Josh Tyrangiel from Time named "Man in the Mirror" among Jackson's ten best songs and "one of Jackson's most powerful vocals and accessible social statements, not to mention the best-ever use of a gospel choir in a pop song". In 2017, ShortList's Dave Fawbert said it contained "one of the greatest key changes in music history".

== Music video ==
The music video was conceived, directed, produced and edited by Don Wilson. It consists of a montage of historical events and figures, including African famines, Adolf Hitler, the American Nazi Party, the Ku Klux Klan, the assassinations of John F. Kennedy and Robert F. Kennedy, Martin Luther King Jr., the Kent State shootings, Mother Teresa, Mahatma Gandhi, the Iran hostage crisis, Muammar Gaddafi, Desmond Tutu, Mikhail Gorbachev, John Lennon, Nelson Mandela, Pieter Botha, Lech Wałęsa, the June Democratic Struggle, the Camp David Accords, INF Treaty and the rescue of Jessica McClure. Wilson said:

I soon understood that much of the [archival] footage had been seen on news programs, and I needed to present it in a way that made it compelling and watchable. I decided to make the video "reversible". What I mean is if one were to play the video in reverse they'd notice that it begins with purity and innocence, and man's inaction and injustices create chaos, hopelessness and war. I wanted people to feel tearful and affected, and maybe for a second they'd think about doing something to change things.

In The New York Times, Jon Pareles wrote that "Man in the Mirror" was "the most offensive music video clip ever", arguing that it repurposed suffering for commercial gain.

== Chart performance ==
"Man in the Mirror" was the fourth consecutive U.S. number-one single from Bad. It debuted on the Billboard Hot 100 on February 6, 1988. It reached number 1 on March 26, 1988, remaining there for two weeks. "Man in the Mirror" reached number 21 on the UK singles chart in 1988; following Jackson's death on June 25, 2009, it reached number 2. In Australia, it charted at number 39; after Jackson's death, it reached number 8. It was also the top single in iTunes downloads in the US and the UK following Jackson's death. An instrumental version was played at Jackson's memorial service. "Man in the Mirror" had sold 567,280 copies in the UK as of January 2016.

== Track listing ==
- 12" and CD
1. "Man in the Mirror" (single version) – 5:04
2. "Man in the Mirror" (album version) – 5:19
3. "Man in the Mirror" (instrumental) – 5:19
- 7"
1. "Man in the Mirror" (single version) – 5:04
- 7" / 12" picture disc
1. "Man in the Mirror" – 4:55
2. "Man in the Mirror" (instrumental) – 4:55

== Personnel ==
- Written and composed by Siedah Garrett and Glen Ballard
- Produced by Quincy Jones and Michael Jackson
- Michael Jackson: lead and background vocals
  - Featuring Siedah Garrett, the Winans and the Andraé Crouch Choir
- Ollie E. Brown: clap and cymbals
- Dann Huff: guitar
- Greg Phillinganes: piano
- Glen Ballard, Randy Kerber: synthesizers
- Glen Ballard: drum programming
- Siedah Garrett: background vocals
- The Winans: Carvin, Marvin, Michael and Ronald Winans
  - Andraé Crouch and his Choir: Sandra Crouch, Maxi Anderson, Rose Banks, Geary Faggett, Vonciele Faggett, Andrew Gouche, Linda Green, Pattie Howard, Jean Johnson, Perry Morgan, Alfie Silas, Roberto Noriega
- Rhythm arrangement by Glen Ballard and Quincy Jones
- Synthesizer arrangement by Glen Ballard, Quincy Jones and Jerry Hey
- Vocal arrangement by Andraé Crouch

== Charts ==
=== Weekly charts ===
Weekly chart performance for "Man in the Mirror"
Chart (1988)	Peak position
Australia (Kent Music Report)	39
Belgium (VRT Top 30 Flanders)	11
Canada (RPM 100 Singles)	3
Canada (RPM Adult Contemporary)	1
Europe (European Hot 100 Singles)	33
Ireland (IRMA)	3
Italy (Musica e Dischi)	16
Italy Airplay (Music & Media)	4
Mexico (La Opinión)	4
Netherlands (Dutch Top 40)	16
Netherlands (Single Top 100)	13
New Zealand (Recorded Music NZ)	4
Puerto Rico (La Opinión)	9
UK Singles (Official Charts)	21
UK Airplay (Music & Media)	1
US Billboard Hot 100	1
US Adult Contemporary (Billboard)	2
US Billboard Hot Dance Music/Maxi-Singles Sales	1
US Hot R&B/Hip-Hop Songs (Billboard)	1
US Radio & Records CHR/Pop Airplay Chart	1
West Germany (GfK)	23

Chart (2008)	Peak position
UK Singles (OCC)	55

Chart (2009–2010)	Peak position
Australia (ARIA)	8
Austria (Ö3 Austria Top 40)	17
Belgium (Back Catalogue Singles Flanders)	6
Denmark (Tracklisten)	12
Eurochart Hot 100	7
Hot Canadian Digital Singles	7
Ireland (IRMA)	3
Japan Hot 100	65
Netherlands (Single Top 100)	22
New Zealand (Recorded Music NZ)	9
Norway (VG-lista)	15
Spain (Promusicae)	50
Sweden (Sverigetopplistan)	19
Switzerland (Schweizer Hitparade)	22
UK Singles (OCC)	2
UK Hip Hop/R&B (Official Charts)	1
UK Airplay (Music Week)	22
US Billboard Hot Digital Songs	2

Chart (2026)	Peak position
Croatia International Airplay (Top lista)	99
Global 200 (Billboard)	108

=== Year-end charts ===
Chart (1988)	Position
Canada Top Singles (RPM)	28
US Billboard Hot 100	21
US Adult Contemporary (Billboard)	35

Chart (2009)	Position
UK Singles (OCC)	61

== Certifications ==
Region	Certification	Certified units/sales
Canada (Music Canada)	3× Platinum	240,000^{‡}
Denmark (IFPI Danmark)	2× Platinum	180,000^{‡}
Germany (BVMI)	Gold	300,000^{‡}
Italy (FIMI)	Gold	50,000^{‡}
Mexico (AMPROFON)	2× Platinum+Gold	150,000^{‡}
New Zealand (RMNZ)	3× Platinum	90,000^{‡}
Spain (Promusicae)	Gold	50,000^{‡}
United Kingdom (BPI)	3× Platinum	1,800,000^{‡}
United States (RIAA)	3× Platinum	3,000,000^{‡}
^{‡} Sales+streaming figures based on certification alone.

== See also ==
- Man in the Mirror: The Michael Jackson Story (2004), a TV movie biopic starring Flex Alexander.
