= CPDRC Dancing Inmates =

Filipino prison inmates performing dance routines

CPDRC Dancing Inmates or the CPDRC dancers is a collective of convicts at Cebu Provincial Detention and Rehabilitation Center (CPDRC), a maximum security prison in Cebu City, Cebu, Philippines. The inmates perform dance routines as part of their daily exercise and rehabilitation, and many of their performances are filmed and released online, making them a popular feature among fans and veritable online celebrities.

Byron F. Garcia, the official security advisor to the Cebu government, is credited with starting a program of choreographed exercise routines for the inmates. He was appointed head of the prison by his sister Gwendolyn Garcia, the governor of Cebu. In 2006, he began uploading videos of the dance performances; its best-known video was the rendition of Michael Jackson's "Thriller".

== History ==
Byron Garcia had originally wanted to introduce a program at Cebu Provincial Detention and Rehabilitation Center (CPDRC) where inmates would exercise for an hour each day. He also claims in a British documentary that his inspiration came while watching the movie The Shawshank Redemption in particular the scene where the sounds of Mozart's Figaro flood the prison yard. Garcia initially introduced an exercise program where the prisoners marched in unison, starting out with marching to the beat of a drum, but moved on to dancing to pop music; he began with one of his favourite songs, Pink Floyd's "Another Brick in the Wall". He chose camp music such as "In the Navy" and "Y.M.C.A." by the Village People, so macho prisoners would not be offended at being asked to dance.

Garcia's first upload of prisoner choreography was the Algorithm March, with 967 inmates, but only generated 400 views in its first eight months. The next upload, Thriller, however, enjoyed a massive response.

The prison now even has its own official choreographer teachers, like Vince Rosales and Gwen Laydor. Some prisoners are chosen more prominently for more sophisticated routines while the general prison population (sometimes up to 1,500 inmates) participate with simpler more accessible routines.

Critics of the practice allege that the dance routines exploit the prisoners rather than rehabilitating them, and some former prisoners have alleged violence against those who refuse to join in.

=== Thriller video ===
On July 17, 2007, Garcia uploaded "Thriller" on YouTube, a rendition of Michael Jackson's music video. The video has Crisanto Nierre as Michael Jackson's role and openly gay inmate Wenjiel Resane as the role of Jackson's girlfriend. Both Crisanto Nierre and Wenjiel Resane enjoy popularity amongst YouTube fans, and their faces usually highlighted quite often in most later videos.

On December 19, in an article on "Most Popular Viral Videos", Time magazine ranked CPDRC's "Thriller" fifth on its Top 10 list. Time's stated description of the prisoners was: "Orange-jumpsuited accused murderers, rapists, and drug dealers paid homage to Michael Jackson's Thriller in a dance performance filmed at the Cebu Provincial Detention and Rehabilitation Center in the Philippines".

=== Public performances ===
On October 6, 2007, Cardinal Archbishop Ricardo Vidal visited CPDRC for the first time, and the prisoners performed six dances for him, as part of the celebration of the Prison Awareness Month; the Archbishop noted, "It was a marvelous show of discipline. If only they had practiced that (discipline) in their lives, they wouldn't be here."

CPDRC requested to participate in the 438th Founder's Day celebration. About 20 inmates were chosen to perform in front of the Cebu Capitol. They performed a medley of "Thriller", "Jump", and "Radio Ga Ga". Donations from the performance totaled 1.6 million peso (US$35,000). The governor and provincial officials were so moved, that they included all 1,500 inmates in a share of the mid-year bonuses for Capitol employees. Each inmate was given 1,000 Philippines pesos (US$22) for good behavior. On December 27, Michael Rama, acting mayor of Cebu City, announced that the Sinulog Foundation executive director Ricky Ballesteros informed the former of the possibility of CPDRC’s participation, but was concerned about parade security. In January 2008, Cebu provincial governor Gwen Garcia, visited CPDRC and took part in some of the dancing exercises with the prisoners. They danced to her signature song, "Mabuhi Ka, Sugbuanon".

"Together in Electric Dreams" by Philip Oakey and Giorgio Moroder, and "Ice Ice Baby" by Vanilla Ice were presented during the Garcia's visit to the prison, on her birthday in October. A competition was held amongst the prisoners as to who would take the lead role of Vanilla Ice in the dance.

In April 2008, CPDRC established a two-hour program, planned for the last Saturday of every month, where visitors could watch the inmates perform, have their pictures taken with inmates, and buy souvenir T-shirts. Nineteen-year-old Egan Torrecampo, a lead dancer, said, "When we are dancing we tend to forget why we were here in the first place."

Ten hours after Michael Jackson died on June 25, 2009, the 1,500 CPDRC inmates performed a tribute show which included songs "Ben", "I'll Be There", and "We Are the World".

The "Queen Medley" consisting of eight Queen songs notably includes the performance of popular gay/transvestite prisoner Wenjiel Resane dressed as a ballerina performing a major routine. Wenjiel was most famous for his performance in "Thriller" with prisoner Crisanto Nierre. The CPDRC 8-minute group performance of Queen songs ends with the appeal "Peace to mankind" and a quotation from Byron Garcia: "If we make life like a living hell for these fallen angels, then we might just be turning out devils once they are released and re-integrated into society".

"Grease Lightning" was performed on November 28, 2009, on the third anniversary of a shooting at CPDRC between feuding gangs. Arabo, a surviving gang leader, was given a lead dancer position. It was his last performance before he was transferred to New Bilibid Prison in Muntinlupa to continue his three consecutive life sentences (or minimum 90 years before parole) for a triple murder.

=== This Is It ===
"They Don't Care About Us" with intro from "Bad" was performed by the CPDRC inmates on January 19, 2010. The dance was specially choreographed for them by Travis Payne, the Michael Jackson choreographer and associate director of This Is It. Through an initiative of Sony Pictures Home Entertainment Payne and two of the top dancers of Michael Jackson's This Is It show, Daniel Celebre and Dres Reid performed with the CPDRC inmates in the Cebu prison, with all the inmate dancers wearing This Is It tribute black T-shirts. Payne, Celebre, and Reid taught the routine to the inmates within 2 days, and all three took part with them in the public performance. The video shoot was part of the global launch of Jackson's This Is It DVD by Sony Pictures Worldwide.

The customized mix contained dance routines and sampling from Jackson's "Bad" in the intro, and a tribute to Martin Luther King Jr. while an audio of his speech is being played. Will Devaughn, a popular Filipino model and actor took part in the routine carrying a poster of the African-American civil rights activist. King is specifically mentioned in the song lyrics as well ("Some things in life they just don't wanna see / But if Martin Luther was livin' / He wouldn't let this be"). In addition to the dance video, a feature video of Payne and the MJ Dancers visit to the prison, the dance practices and visits to Cebu officials was made to document this initiative.

Payne and company also danced to "Thriller" with the inmates. The "Thriller" viral video by the CPDRC inmates featuring Crisanto Nierre and Wenjiel Resane had catapulted the inmates to fame. "Michael saw the Cebu dancing inmates on YouTube and enjoyed them immensely", said his choreographer, Travis Payne. "During rehearsals, we would watch and he would get tremendous joy". Sony Pictures' Fritz Friedman told USA Today, "We thought it would be a great idea to pay homage to MJ on the occasion of the release of This Is It by going to Cebu and having Travis work with the dancers to create this piece which is from the film." The inmates also made special performance of their Michael Jackson tribute routine.

=== Suspension of public performances ===
In February 2010, Cebu governor Gwen Garcia ordered that the program be put on hold, pending investigation of proper accounting practices for donations received by generous admirers of the CPDRC program. The inmates’ longstanding choreographer, Gwen Lador also resigned. Byron's contract as Capitol security consultant had also not been renewed past 2010. Media reports talked about strains in relationships between Gwen Garcia and Byron Garcia, as Gwen instructed the Provincial Agriculture Office to continue with the reform and intensify the program on "planting of crops inside the compound" instead of dancing, expressing concerns that the dance performances were overshadowing the general rehabilitation program.

After a public outcry asking for the resumption of the dancing program for the inmates, Cebu Capitol consultant Rory Jon Sepulveda said that the rehabilitation by way of dancing at the CPDRC has continued, but the public viewing has been put on hold. "The CPDRC is now on regular operations—the dancing continues to be one of the rehabilitation activities", said Sepulveda. Furthermore, Sepulveda said, "Public performances will resume once the mechanism for full accountability on donations are in place". Also, as a sharp contrast from earlier days, as of March 2010, the dancing has become optional. About half of the prisoners said that they would not take part if the performances were not public. The Governor sought the services of the original "Thriller" choreographer, Vince Rosales, to teach the dance routines inside the jail facility for the inmates.

On September 29, 2012, after "insistent demand" from the public, and after many months of no online releases, the CPDRC dancers returned to perform "Gangnam Style", an international dance hit by South Korean rapper PSY, in the rain.

== Dances and presentations ==
The following is a list of dance and presentation videos uploaded by Byron Garcia and others.

Date	Title	Artist	Notes	Video
October 2, 2006	"Algorithm March"	Itsumo Kokokara	Japanese song from children's TV series PythagoraSwitch, first uploaded video	
October 2, 2006	"Bebot"	The Black Eyed Peas	--	
April 24, 2007	"Radio Ga Ga"	Queen	--	
April 26, 2007	"Jumbo Hotdog"	Masculados	Philippine music group	
April 30, 2007	"I Will Follow Him"	Little Peggy March from Sister Act	--	
April 30, 2007	"Dayang Dayang"	Aishwarya Rai	--	
July 17, 2007	"Thriller" (original upload)	Michael Jackson	--	
July 17, 2007	"Hail Holy Queen"	Deloris & The Sisters from Sister Act	--	
August 6, 2007	"At the Cebu Capitol" (Medley)	--	in front of the Cebu Capitol at the 438th Founding Anniversary Celebration; Songs included: "Thriller" by Michael Jackson; "Y.M.C.A." by Village People; "Radio Ga Ga" by Queen	--
October 2007	"Ice Ice Baby"	Vanilla Ice	performed for Governor Gwendolyn Garcia's 52nd birthday	--
October 2007	"Together in Electric Dreams"	Philip Oakey	performed for Governor Gwendolyn Garcia's 52nd birthday	--
October 8, 2007	"Rico Mambo"	Breakfast Club	--	
October 8, 2007	"The Hustle"	Van McCoy	--	
October 8, 2007	"Gregorian Chant"	Benedictine Monks of Santo Domingo de Silos	presented during a visit by Cardinal Ricardo Vidal	
October 16, 2007	"Canon in D" (Rock Version)	Johann Pachelbel	Guitar: Edgar Nacua	
November 9, 2007	"Rico Mambo"	Breakfast Club	for the TV series Pinoy Big Brother with the contestants Riza Santos, Megan Young, Gaby dela Merced, Victor Basa and Mcoy Fundales	
November 15, 2007	"Hare Hare Yukai"	Aya Hirano, Minori Chihara and Yuko Goto from The Melancholy of Haruhi Suzumiya	--	
December 21, 2007	"Jump (for My Love)"	The Pointer Sisters	--	
January 18, 2008	CPDRC Sinulog 2008	--	homage to Santo Niño because of the Sinulog festival; featuring the song "Marching Band Medley" from the movie Drumline	
January 18, 2008	"Mabuhi ka GWEN"	--	with Gwendolyn Garcia, Governor of Cebu; featuring the Cebuano song "Mabuhi Ka, Sugbuanon", composed by Paul Melendez	
February 23, 2008	"Crank That (Soulja Boy)" / "U Can't Touch This"	Soulja Boy / MC Hammer	Audio was muted after 7 million views because of copyright Video reuploaded to Metacafe	
April 2, 2008	"Gloria"	Laura Branigan	Audio was changed on the original video due to copyright issues. Video reuploaded to Metacafe	
April 28, 2008	"Holding Out for a Hero"	Bonnie Tyler	--	
June 28, 2008	"Low"	Flo Rida ft. T-Pain	--	
July 28, 2008	"Macarena (Jon Secada remix)"	Los Del Rio	with introduction by Los Del Rio	
August 30, 2008	"Pump It"	Black Eyed Peas	--	
October 9, 2008	"CPDRC Song"	CPDRC	promotional video bilingual in Tagalog and English	
January 19, 2009	"CPDRC Dance"	CPDRC	second promotional video bilingual in Tagalog and English	
February 4, 2009	"My Sharona"	The Knack	--	
March 13, 2009	"Just Can't Get Enough"	Depeche Mode	--	
March 30, 2009	"Nobody"	Wonder Girls	--	
April 27, 2009	"Lies" / "Tell Me"	Big Bang / Wonder Girls	--	
June 1, 2009	"Jai Ho"	A. R. Rahman and Sukhwinder Singh	--	
June 27, 2009	Michael Jackson Tribute	Michael Jackson	Songs included: "Dangerous"; "Ben"; "I'll Be There"; "We Are the World"	
June 27, 2009	"Sorry Sorry"	Super Junior	performed after Michael Jackson tribute; uploaded on July 3, 2009	
July 25, 2009	"Dangerous"	Michael Jackson	--	
August 29, 2009	"Fire"	2NE1	--	
November 4, 2009	Queen Medley	Queen/Styx	Songs included: "Bohemian Rhapsody"; "We Will Rock You"; "Princes of the Universe"; "Another One Bites the Dust"; "I Want to Break Free"; "Breakthru"; "Don't Stop Me Now"; "Mr Roboto" by Styx	
November 28, 2009	"Greased Lightning"	Grease	includes 6:40 speech by Byron Garcia	
January 23, 2010	"They Don't Care About Us"	Michael Jackson	featuring choreographer Travis Payne and "MJ Dancers" Daniel Celebre and Dres Reid	
December 30, 2011	"Party Rock Anthem"	LMFAO	--	
September 29, 2012	"Gangnam Style"	PSY	--	
August 4, 2019	"Daddy"	PSY	--	
December 21, 2020	"Unity Dance"	--	conceptualized by the National Commission for Culture and the Arts; performed to "Sayaw", a song specifically composed for the dance	
October 2, 2025	"Cebu Dancing Inmates Comeback: For SUPER JUNIOR's 20th Anniversary"	Super Junior	Video tribute for Super Junior's 20th anniversary. Also the comeback of the Cebu Dancing Inmates after 5 years. Songs Performed: * "Superman" * "Express Mode" * "Mr. Simple" * "Sorry Sorry"	

== In popular culture ==
The CPDRC dancers have been featured in a number of news items.

- Netflix created an original 5 part documentary by director Michele Josue called "Happy Jail" about the CPDRC and its consultant Marco Toral. The dancing inmates and their choreographer are featured prominently, as well as discussion about the benefits of the dancing program as to its rehabilitative value.
- A thirty-minute documentary by SBS/Dateline and Journeyman Pictures entitled "Jailhouse Rock", a take on the popular Elvis Presley song takes a positive look at the program. Byron Garcia is quoted at the beginning saying humorously: "This is what America has been longing for... a jailhouse rock, which they only saw in Elvis... Jailhouse... and they're rockin'."
- The British Channel 4 Documentary Murderers on the Dancefloor broadcast in January 2008 portrayed life in the prison. The program showed various inmates praising Byron Garcia, the founder of the initiative—many of whom had tattoos in recognition of Garcia. However, it also featured an anonymous ex-inmate who claimed Garcia employs certain prisoners to rough up with prisoners who refuse to dance.
- Five housemates from the reality show Pinoy Big Brother: Celebrity Edition 2 performed "Rico Mambo" with the inmates. The participants were: Victor Basa, Megan Young, Gaby Dela Merced, Riza Santos, and Mcoy Fundales. The CPDRC dancers had done the routine in an earlier video. The housemates received loud applause from the inmates after the dance number.
- Responding to various criticism and persistent negative comments in the YouTube response section and alleged use of force to make the prisoners dance and using torture against dissenters who refused to take part, Byron Garcia who runs the prison and posts the videos put out a comment on the main page of CPDRC on YouTube refuting the allegations. He says in his message: "There are sick people who think that dancing is a form of cruel punishment! Since when was dancing categorized as punishment? My fellow citizens of the world, cruel and violent forms of punishment are a thing of the past. If we make jails a living hell for the prisoners, then, we might just be sending out devils once they are released and re-integrated to society. To all "non-believers" of humane treatment of prisoners, and to all haters of our non-violent approach to rehabilitation, all I can say is ...get a life!"
- CPDRC followed that up by putting a bilingual song in the local language and in English explaining the program. The video release called CPDRC Song included lyrics that say: "We're the dancing inmates of CPDRC, we dance and entertain the world and make you all happy, a new approach to rehabilitation, representing Cebu province and the rest of our nation. We're the dancing inmates of CPDRC, fun and laughter, smiles in every corner. Got the world's attention, coz we've got moves, and now all millions of you say you've watched us on YouTube, CPDRC, CPDRC, CPDRC Inmates"
- The Thriller video also inspired a short documentary by young filmmaker Pepe Diokno, entitled Dancing for Discipline. The documentary is a pointed examination of the cultures of power in Philippine systems, with telling interviews of Byron Garcia and inmates Wenjiel Resane and Crisanto Niere. In a column for the Philippine Star Diokno writes, "Jails are a microcosm of society, and in them we can clearly see how the cultures of power and patronage play. This is what Dancing for Discipline is about." The film was funded from a grant by USAID through the Asia Foundation, and is part of a series of short films about Philippine jails, entitled Rock the Rehas. The three other films in the series are DokumenTADO: Rock the Rehas by Tado Jimenez, Buhay Looban by Lourd de Veyra, and 1048:2261 by Gang Badoy. These premiered on November 25, 2007, in Makati, Philippines, with Philippine Supreme Court Justice Reynato Puno in attendance, hailing the effort.
- The Korean Sun Dance Troupe danced before the inmates for Valentine's Day 2008.
- The Film Samsara has a sequence featuring CPDRC dancers.
- The Japanese transgender artist / comedian Ai Haruna visited the prison and performed some of her acts. She also filmed the event to be shown on Japanese television.
- Los del Río sent a message of support saying that in their remake of their popular hit Macarena produced by Jon Secada, they will include featured footage from the CPDRC prisoners dance routine of the song.
- Drag queen Alvin performed in front of the CPDRC inmates cross-dressed as a nurse on the occasion of Byron Garcia's birthday.
- CNN's Joy Behar interviewed Travis Payne, the Michael Jackson choreographer on the Joy Behar Show about the CPDRC prison program and his experiences preparing "They Don't Know About Us" dance routine with the inmates.
- CPDRC Dancing Inmates were offered to appear in a Procter & Gamble advertisement for detergent products. But Cebu Governor Gwendolyn Garcia, who also serves as Cebu provincial jailer, turned down the P250,000 offer. "The dancing inmates should not be used for commercial purposes to preserve the nobility of this world phenomenon”, Governor Garcia said.
- In 2011, the popular Glee series broadcast on the American Fox network made direct reference to the Dancing Inmates. In one particular Glee episode, known as the "Super Bowl" episode in 2011, the instructor Will Schuester (played by Matthew Morrison) is shown speaking passionately to his arts students saying: "Remember a few years ago when that Philippines prison performed that mega performance of "Thriller" and put it on YouTube? It took them 4 months to rehearse that number. Prisoner-on-prisoner crime dropped... 80%. Doing that together as a team created a unity within that prison. And that's what I am looking to do it here."
- In a 2015 episode of the popular German TV show Joko gegen Klaas – Das Duell um die Welt, Klaas Heufer-Umlauf faced a unique challenge set by his co-host, Joko Winterscheidt. Klaas was tasked with becoming the lead dancer for a performance of "They Don’t Care About Us" together with the CPDRC Dancing Inmates in the Philippines. To succeed, Klaas had to master the entire choreography within 48 hours while living as an inmate in the facility. Completing the challenge would earn him a point for the competition.

The Dancing Inmates inspired the launch of a stage musical entitled Prison Dancer: The Musical. The musical play was staged in New York during the New York Music Festival (NYMF) in July 2012 at the St. Clements Theatre. The story revolves around the lives of eight Filipino maximum-security prisoners who get a shot at changing their lives when a video of their dance-based rehabilitation program becomes a YouTube hit. The main character, Christian Escodero was played by Filipino-American actor Jose Llana. The play was created by writer-director-composer Romeo Candido and writer Carmen De Jesus, who met while performing in the musical Miss Saigon.

=== Prison Dancer: The Interactive Web Musical ===
In 2012, Filipino Canadian singer-actor Mikey Bustos starred in a 12-episode interactive web series titled Prison Dancer: The Interactive Web Musical inspired mainly by the CPDRC dancers. The series also featured 12 original songs with music and lyrics by Romeo Candido and script by Romeo Candido and Carmen De Jesus, a creative team who met while performing in Miss Saigon. The series recounts the story of six Filipino prisoners whose lives are forever changed when they decide to form a dancing group inside the prison and turn a maximum security jailhouse into a world stage. This web series is an adaptation of Candido and De Jesus' stage musical production, Prison Dancer: The Musical." The episodes were titled chronologically "Point of View", "Day One", On the Inside", "Lose Your Way", "Pak Yow", "Evermore", "Step", "Loveteams", "This Great Divide", "Breakout", "Finally Free" and Sensation".

=== Dance of the Steel Bars ===
In 2013, a film, Dance of the Steel Bars was launched through Portfolio Films International. The 94-minute action and adventure drama film that premiered in the Philippines on June 12, 2013, and is greatly inspired by the CPDRC Dancing Inmates of Cebu. Upon insistence of the directors, the film's first screening was held inside the Cebu Provincial Detention and Rehabilitation Center a week earlier on June 7. Jointly directed by Cesar Apolinario, a GMA News and Public Affairs reporter and host and Marnie Manicad, producer-director of National Geographic documentaries, it stars Dingdong Dantes and Patrick Bergin. The screenwriters were Cris Lim and Michael Villar. The film tells the story of Frank Parish (played by Bergin), a retired US fireman and philanthropist who finds himself wrongly accused of murder of a local Filipino. Stuck in a Philippines prison, Frank becomes friends with an imprisoned dance instructor Mando (played by Dingdong Dantes) convicted of killing a transsexual. whose passion for dancing will topple the corrupt system that weighs down the inmates' chance to become better individuals. Allona, a transvestite (played by Joey Paras) in the Cebu Provincial Detention and Rehabilitation Center plays role of a dance instructor who tries to contribute to prison reforms by teaching his fellow inmates dance exercises. Also in the film are Ricky Davao, the jail warden, Gabe Mercado, as Diaz, the corrupt and ambitious deputy warden and Thou Reyes, as Dong Mata, a criminally insane hatchet man of the deputy warden. It was filmed on location in Cebu and Manila and some scenes actually filmed inside Cebu prison filmed many inmates in various roles. Cebu Governor Gwen Garcia played a cameo as herself. Cindera Che, a well-known performance coach based in Los Angeles, choreographed the dance performances in the movie. Edward White, a London-based composer, wrote the score for the movie. the film received 4 nominations for the 32nd Luna Awards.

== Implementation in other prisons ==
Byron Garcia, the warden who created the dancing program for the inmates, has put up a team of former "Dancing Inmates" to spread the message of "Music and Dance Therapy" to all jails nationwide in the Philippines. This is a pioneering initiative to institutionalize music therapy in other jails, similar to CPDRC's original program, with Cebu former inmates dancing making a tour of three prisons initially, Manila City Jail, Makati City Jail, and Quezon City Jail according to an agreement signed between Resendo M. Dial, chief of Philippines "Bureau of Jail Management and Penology" (BJMP) and Byron Garcia on March 26, 2010, as a collaborative effort to introduce music therapy in jail facilities nationwide.

On the occasion of the signing of the protocol, Garcia characterized general prison facilities as "living hells", because those who are in penology and rehabilitation "are missing out the essence of compassion, redemption and restoration in jail management". He added: "They are too busy looking for creative ways to punish an offender instead of restoring him to become the human being that he is. We have to look at prisons beyond the cycle of crime and punishment and certainly look inside underlying social, cultural and scriptural implications of rehabilitation. As it is, those creative ways of punishing offenders that have led to restrictive and punitive conditions in jails have also bred demons out of prisoners". Garcia said that this therapeutic protocol of dance and music is meant to restore dignity to people who suffer the stigma of incarceration and restore self-esteem to inmates because they are alienated from society. Therapeutic music and dance is meant to help prisoners cope with their depression and anxiety, improve their well-being as they go through a transition phase and reintegrate to society. Music is a protocol to heal them of emotional and psychological disorders and trauma as a result of the offense or incarceration". He concluded that "the experience of the CPDRC Dancing Inmates has proven a clinical breakthrough of using therapeutic music and dance in healing, restoring and rehabilitating inmates to become dignified human beings. This is actually what prompted BMJP to take interest in spreading such a program", he said.

A group of former dancing inmates will also tour the country's prisons for presentations in addition to a series of public performances to increase awareness to the program among the general population.

The offshoots of the program can be seen in The Quezon City Dancing Inmates and the Manila City Jail Dancing Inmates programs, greatly structured on the concepts applied in CPDRC.

== Awards ==
In April 2011, during the 10th Tribeca Film Festival, Byron Garcia was awarded Tribeca's "Disruptive Innovator Award 2011", the second annual award of the sort.
