= Travis Payne =

American choreographer, director and producer

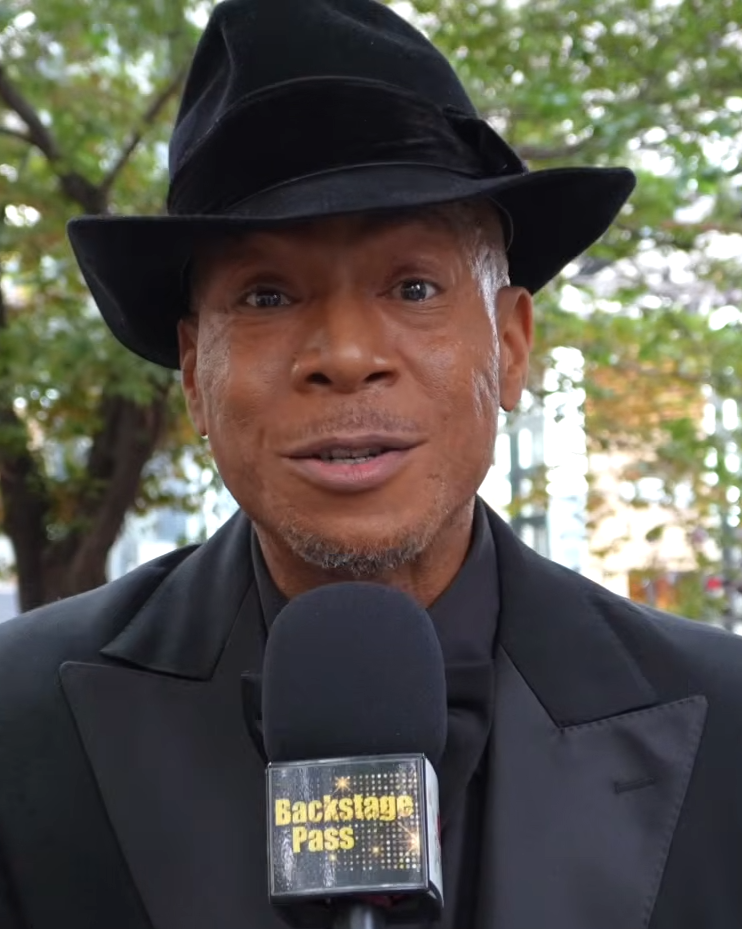
- Payne at the Japanese premiere of Michael in Tokyo, 2026
- Born: July 5, 1971 (age 54); Atlanta, Georgia, U.S.
- Occupations: Choreographer, director, producer
- Years active: 1990–present
- Website: www.travispayne.com

Travis Payne (born July 5, 1971) is an American choreographer, director, and producer. He was the choreographer for Michael Jackson's This Is It until Jackson's death. Payne also served as the associate producer for This Is It and along with the director, Kenny Ortega, was extensively and intimately involved in the making of the film. To date, This Is It worldwide gross revenue totaled $261.3 million during its theatrical run, making it the highest-grossing documentary or concert movie of all time.

Travis Payne is the youngest inductee into the Gallery of Greats and the recipient of numerous nominations and awards. He has received the MTV Video Music Award for Best Choreography four times for his work with En Vogue, Salt-N-Pepa, as well as Michael Jackson and Janet Jackson on the music video and short film "Scream," which was listed in the Guinness Book of World Records as the most expensive music video ever made. He also received three American Choreography Awards, including honors for his work on "Scream" and Michael Jackson's Ghosts. Payne was nominated for an Emmy Award for his choreography work with Michael Jackson on the "Dangerous" performance for the 1995 MTV Video Music Awards opening segment. He was again nominated for an Emmy Award in 2006 for his work on Disney's The Suite Life of Zack & Cody. He is also a two-time recipient of the Music Video Producers Association Award for Outstanding Achievement in Choreography for his work with the Brian Setzer Orchestra and Ally McBeal. In December 2009, Payne was featured with a write-up in the Michael Jackson Opus and recognized for his choreography and contribution to his work with the King of Pop. He also appeared in a 1993 episode of the TV series Martin.

On January 26, 2011, Travis Payne received a Lifetime Achievement Award at the 12th anniversary show of The Carnival: Choreographer's Ball.

== Early life and education ==
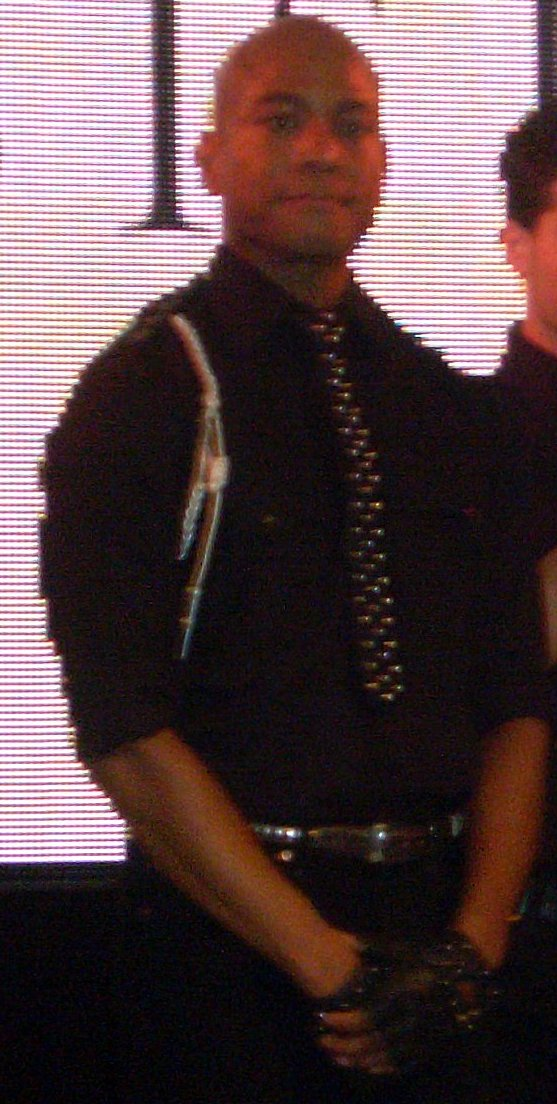
Travis Payne at This Is It launch in HMV London, 2010.

Travis Payne was born in Atlanta in 1971. He began dancing at age 4 and began formal training five years later with Norma B. Mitchell and her daughter, Djana Bell. In 1984, Payne went to Northside School of the Arts, where he studied with William G. Densmore and performed in Atlanta's Showbiz Kids. He later joined the Harrison Dance Company before moving to Los Angeles.

== Career ==
At 19, Payne was selected for his first professional role, joining Janet Jackson's Rhythm Nation 1814 World Tour. He subsequently appeared with Prince, Debbie Allen, En Vogue, TLC, and Michael Jackson on his Dangerous World Tour. As a result of his work with Jackson, Payne was exposed to the entire creative process and began to choreograph for various other stars. In 2008, Payne choreographed a tribute segment to Michael Jackson, which included Omarion on the television series Dancing with the Stars.

In May 2009, Payne started to work with Michael Jackson and Kenny Ortega on This Is It which was a sold-out series of fifty concerts by Jackson to be held at the O2 Arena in London. These were Jackson's first significant concert events since the HIStory World Tour in 1997 and had been cited as one of the year's most important musical events, with over one million people attending in total. Unfortunately, the concert series was canceled due to Jackson's untimely death. On July 7, 2009, Payne helped choreograph the Michael Jackson memorial service at the Staples Center in Los Angeles, which was broadcast live around the world, from the U.S. to Slovakia to parts of Asia, with an estimated one billion viewers. Following Jackson's passing, Payne worked very closely with Ortega to piece together rehearsal footage from Michael Jackson's This Is It which was put together from rough footage recorded at the Los Angeles Forum and the Staples Center. Subsequently, the film was released worldwide with a limited two-week theatrical run from October 28 to November 12, 2009. Tickets went on sale a month early, on September 27, 2009, to satisfy a high anticipated demand; to date, the film has broken numerous records via tickets, both pre-sale and sales worldwide.

In December 2009, Payne also choreographed Lady Gaga on The Monster Ball Tour as well as provided direction for her performances on the 2009 American Music Awards, The Jay Leno Show, and Ellen. He also worked with Mariah Carey on her "H.A.T.E.U." video. To round out the year, he traveled to Japan to work with SMAP and choreograph a Michael Jackson tribute that was aired on TV for the New Year's Eve special.

In January 2010, Payne embarked on a peace tour and arranged a surprise visit to the Cebu province of the Philippines to work with the CPDRC Dancing Inmates of the Cebu Provincial Detention and Rehabilitation Center (CPDRC), a maximum security that is also featured in the Michael Jackson Opus. Famous for their "Thriller" which received 300,000 views per day at its peak, the video has received over 37 million reported views and is considered one of the most viral videos viewed on the internet. Payne, along with This Is It dancers Daniel Celebre (a.k.a. Da FunkyMystic) and Dres Reid taught over 1500 dancing inmates to perform "The Drill" as part of the song "They Don't Care About Us" which was videotaped to coincide with the This Is It DVD and Blu-ray release on January 25, 2010. The clip went live on YouTube, Yahoo and TMZ and immediately captured more than 3 million views within a week of its release online.

In April 2010, Payne was honored by The Michael Jackson Tribute Portrait, the largest Michael Jackson tribute in the world, endorsed by the Jackson Family Foundation. The tribute is an interactive work of art by artist David Ilan, which is made from one million hand-drawn dots. Friends and family of Jackson's get a dot in their name in the area of Jackson's heart.

In October 2010, CBS announced that Payne would join Kimberly Wyatt executive producer, lead judge, and personal idol Paula Abdul on the judges panel for her new dance competition and reality show Live to Dance. CBS describes the series as broadcast television's first all-ages, all-genres dance series that is based on Sky 1's UK dance show Got to Dance. The different acts will compete for a $500,000 prize in front of the panel of judges, and viewers will eventually get to vote for their favorite dancers during the semifinal and final rounds. Live to Dance kicked off with a two-hour special on January 4, 2011 before moving to its regular hour-long slot on Wednesdays, which started on January 5.

Payne also creatively directed and choreographed for Hong Kong singer Andy Lau along with Stacy Walker for the Andy Lau Unforgettable Concert 2010 throughout the year. In addition, he also worked with Han Geng to choreograph the singer's title track for his first solo album, along with four other dancers from This Is It. When the album promotions arose, Payne performed with the singer and the dancers on various Chinese variety and talk shows as the opening.

In November 2010, Payne was seen on Michael Jackson's The Experience at Dance School.

Payne also worked with pop singer Manika. He choreographed her live shows along with directing and choreographing her debut music video, "Just Can't Let You Go," featuring Young Money's Lil Twist.

In 2013, Payne started work in Japan with Johnny & Associates.

In 2022, Payne became a judge of the talent competition show Yoshiki Superstar Project X, airing on Hulu Japan and produced by Japanese musician and composer Yoshiki.

== Filmography ==
=== Film ===
| Year | Title | Role | Notes |
|---|---|---|---|
| 1992 | Newsies | Newsies Dancer | |
| 1996 | Michael Jackson's Ghosts | Dancer | |
| 1997 | Cinderella | Dancer #3 | TV movie |
| 1999 | Double Platinum | Dancer | |

=== Television ===
| Year | Title | Role | Notes |
|---|---|---|---|
| 1993 | Martin | Dancer | Episode: "Variety Show" |
| 1994 | Red Shoe Diaries | Dancer | Episode: "Emily's Dance" |
| 1998 | Ally McBeal | Go-Go Dancer #4 | Episode: "Making Spirits Bright" |
| 2002 | Lizzie McGuire | Teacher | Episode: "Inner Beauty" |
