= Thriller (viral video) =

2007 video featuring dancing inmates

The inmates dancing to "Thriller" in their YouTube video

Thriller is a viral video featuring the CPDRC Dancing Inmates of a high-security penitentiary. In 2007, the inmates of Cebu Provincial Detention and Rehabilitation Center (CPDRC), a maximum security prison in Cebu, the Philippines, imitated the zombie dance featured in the music video of Michael Jackson's "Thriller". The footage, uploaded onto video-sharing website YouTube, became a viral video. The idea behind the dance came from the prison's chief, Byron F. Garcia. Garcia first conceived the idea of exercising as an enjoyable way of keeping the prisoners mentally and physically fit. Music was then added to provide additional motivation. The convicts marched and danced to several songs, including "In the Navy" and "Y.M.C.A." by the Village People.

Garcia posted the prisoners' dance regimes onto the internet in April 2007. The most popular of the presentations was their Thriller performance. The video showed over 1,500 male inmates emulating Michael Jackson's dance moves from the original Thriller short film. Jackson fan Crisanto Nierre played the role of the pop star, with the openly gay former pizza chef Wenjiel Resane playing his girlfriend. The video became one of the most viewed on the internet, receiving 300,000 views per day at its peak. As of November 12, 2016, the Thriller viral video has received over 59 million reported views. The clip also garnered complaints, with one professor stating that the dancing does not rehabilitate CPDRC inmates. The prison and its officers faced allegations of prisoner abuse, claims which both the officers and inmates denied.

The prisoners have performed numerous other songs, including "Radio Ga Ga", "Together in Electric Dreams", "Holding Out for a Hero", and several songs from Sister Act. One of their performances involves the inmates holding portraits of figures such as the Dalai Lama, Pope John Paul II and Mahatma Gandhi. As a result of the prisoners' internet fame, many visitors come to CPDRC to view the monthly performances held by the convicts. Their presentations are seen from viewing platforms surrounding the exercise yard. At the jail, visitors can have their pictures taken with the inmates. They can also buy souvenir prison shirts.

== Background ==
I hope that all the people who see us will be happy in knowing that we, despite being prisoners, we were able to do this. Before the dancing, our problems were really heavy to bear. Dancing takes our minds away from our problems. Our bodies became more healthy. As for the judges, they may be impressed with us, seeing that we are being rehabilitated and this could help our case. We are being rehabilitated in a good way.

—Crisanto Nierre, inmate who played Michael Jackson

Cebu Provincial Detention and Rehabilitation Center is a maximum security prison in Cebu, in the Cebu Province of the Philippines. The center is run by Byron F. Garcia, and its inmates are either facing trial or are serving sentences for crimes ranging from shoplifting to murder and rape. In 2007, more than 300 of the inmates were facing murder charges. Garcia initiated the idea of exercising as an enjoyable way of keeping the prisoners mentally and physically fit. "While the goal is to keep the body fit in order to keep the mind fit, such may not happen if it is done in a manner deemed unpleasurable", Garcia said. Considering music to be "the language of the soul", Garcia added it to the prisoner's workout regime. Garcia also wanted the music workouts to be a way in which to break down gang factions amongst prison inmates. Melita Thomeczeck, the Philippine's deputy consulate general in New York, suspected that the warden added the music in order to take detainee's minds off of other matters. One of the first songs the prisoners worked with was Pink Floyd's "Another Brick in the Wall". Garcia had them march to the music as a bid to increase participation in exercise. Other early musical choices included "In the Navy" and "Y.M.C.A." by the Village People. The Village People songs were chosen so that macho inmates "wouldn't be offended by being asked to dance".

For Filipinos, music and dancing is said to be a way of life. Natives of the Philippines are reported to have a tendency to "sing and dance their way out of even the most complicated situations". Thomeczeck stated, "The Filipinos love music and they love to sing and dance. Whatever they are in a natural way, they can continue that habit in prison." Despite other colleagues' enthusiasm about the dancing, chief administrator Patrick Rubio of the Directorate of Operations within the Bureau of Jail Management and Penology was worried about the volume of inmates dancing, as CPDRC was undermanned. Despite inmate dancing not being prohibited by the center's Operations Manual, Rubio thought of the dance as a disaster waiting to happen. "As a jail officer, I got worried when I saw it", Rubio commented. The inmates were not fond of the idea either, pelting a visiting choreographer with slippers the first time he arrived at the prison. Prisoners eventually agreed to dance, but admitted that the routines took a while to master. "It was difficult at first, but eventually we inmates got used to it", inmate Mario Benito revealed. The program began as an experiment and, after six months, prison chiefs concluded that it was a successful one.

== Video and response ==
In 2007, Garcia posted several videos of his inmates' performances on YouTube in hopes of inspiring other prisons to learn from the experience. The clips became some of the most talked about in cyberspace. The most popular of the videos was uploaded in April 2007. It showed over 1,500 male inmates imitating the zombie dance featured in the music video of Michael Jackson's "Thriller". The prisoners wore their orange jail-issue jumpsuits during the performance in the jail's exercise yard. The Los Angeles Times later commented that the dance moves were not lifted directly from the video, "but they are performed with such precision it somehow seems that they must have been". Inmate Crisanto Nierre played the role of Michael Jackson. Nierre, who at the time was awaiting trial on drug charges, has been a fan of Jackson since he was in a dance troupe at high school. USA Today noted that his favorite Jackson tracks were "Bad" and "Smooth Criminal". Former pizza chef Wenjiel Resane, who is gay, played the part of Jackson's girlfriend. At the time, Resane had already been at the prison for three years, also awaiting trial on drug charges.

Forty-eight hours after being uploaded onto YouTube, the video had been viewed 266,000 times. After a week, the number of hits had risen to over one million. Within two weeks of the Thriller video being uploaded, it had been viewed by some three million YouTube users. The following week, the number had almost doubled, coming close to six million hits. On average, the clip received 300,000 views per day at its peak. The video generated mixed reviews, with some critics claiming that Garcia forced the inmates to perform, an accusation the prisoners refuted. Several of the inmates showed devotion towards their prison chief, with as many as 20 prisoners bearing tattoos with Garcia's name. Garcia's concept of having prisoners dance as part of a rehabilitation program has been copied by several prisons, including jails in Quezon province and Muntinlupa. Garcia commented that the movie showed that dancing is not a cruel or unusual punishment. He claimed that his prison showed that negative inmates could be turned into positive individuals, through the concept of a "revolutionized penology". Following Garcia's presentation of an inmate performance at the province's Founding Day celebrations, a donation of $35,000 was given to the prison. Each inmate received $22 of the gift, deposited into a prison passbook account. The remaining money went to the Cebu province and its employees, to defray the costs of incarceration.

The prison inmates Thriller performance made it to the pages of Time on the international magazine’s list of the most watchable Internet videos for 2007. The inmates' interpretation of the Thriller music video was ranked the fifth of 10 "most popular viral videos" of the year, or the "Web clips we couldn’t stop watching". Time described the convicts as "orange-jumpsuited accused murderers, rapists and drug dealers", and noted that their performance was made in "homage" to Jackson's Thriller. The magazine stated that the viral video had been downloaded more than nine million times. (As of January 18, 2008, the reported views of the video have reached almost 15 million).

Edward Latessa, professor and head of division of criminal justice at the University of Cincinnati, declared that the prisoners who are dancing are not being rehabilitated. Latessa stated that the prisoners may think that they are getting something out of the performances, when, in reality, they are not. He described it as having a potentially harmful effect. The professor insisted that more appropriate rehabilitation programs, like substance abuse or family reunification programs, should be implemented with as much coordination and vigor. The detention workers disagreed with the assessment, deeming the activities to be an integral part of rehabilitation. "It combines the need for physical exercise and their love to sing and dance", Thomeczeck argued. "In more ways than one, it contributes to their rehabilitation and eventual reintegration. It's a way to put themselves together physically and probably spiritually. That's good, isn't it?". Entertainment Weekly put it on its end-of-the-decade, "best-of" list, saying, "Now that's a 'breakout' hit: The clip of inmates at a high-security prison in the Philippines performing an intricately choreographed dance to Michael Jackson's "Thriller" has nabbed more than 42 million views since 2007."

== Aftermath ==
In late 2007, Pinoy Big Brother: Celebrity Edition 2 scheduled a visit from some of its celebrities to the provincial jail. The celebrities danced with 1,600 CPDRC inmates to the tune of "Rico Mambo" as part of their weekly task, set by Big Brother. The request had been made by Maria Rowena Benitez, Pinoy Big Brother production manager. The housemates were not informed of their task, but were brought to the prison in blindfolds. They were then subsequently given back their sight, with the inmates surrounding them. Beforehand, it was also announced that the Big Brother celebrity housemates would perform a concert, with the proceeds being donated to CPDRC. The concert, held inside the Pinoy Big Brother house in Manila, was attended by 100 people, who each paid P1,000.

The CPDRC inmates have performed numerous other songs, including Queen's "Radio Ga Ga" and several songs from Sister Act, with prisoners dressing as nuns in habits. 44 female inmates, held in a separate wing from the males, joined the men in a dance to "I Will Follow Him". "Hail Holy Queen", from Sister Act 2, and the Algorithm March were also performed by the convicts and then upload onto YouTube. The inmates dance in order to help pass the time while serving their prison sentences or awaiting a trial. More than 900 of the inmates take part in the routines, with a small group of dancers at the core of each performance. Every prisoner at CPDRC, apart from the old and the infirm, has a part in the routine. Garcia directs and choreographs each of the dances. The inmates' participation is said to be completely voluntary, with no prisoner being forced to dance. "It would be different if they are being forced to dance", declared Rubio. "I've never known any prisoners being forced to dance. It's normal to dance." The inmates have express pride at their performing success, and routinely query the viewing figures for their routines. By August 2007, ten of the prisoners' performances had been viewed over 100,000 times each. In 2007, the prisoners stated that they were to perform to Vanilla Ice's "Ice Ice Baby". At the time, they were also practicing Philip Oakey and Giorgio Moroder's "Together in Electric Dreams", a homage to the inmates' fans.

In January 2008, Garcia requested that the prisoners perform their Thriller routine at the annual Sinulog festival, a popular street-music festival organised by the Catholic Augustinian in celebration of baby Jesus. The nine-day fiesta and party is preceded by a solemn religious procession. The mayor of Cebu, Tomas Osmena, refused to permit the request, stating that the inmates could dance all they wanted in jail. "I will not allow it even if Michael Jackson joins them", he commented. Garcia had hoped that, by allowing the inmates to be a part of the Sinulog celebrations, Cebu would showcase the success of his rehabilitation programme. "By showing these highly disciplined inmates, perhaps we might just be giving hope that Cebu is not just about the mardi gras, but rather, Cebu is about leadership and good governance." The CPDRC inmates were expected to be tough competition for the Lumad Basakonon, a group which has won the free interpretation category of the Sinulog festival for two consecutive years.

As a result of the prisoners' internet fame, many visitors come to CPDRC to view the monthly performances held by the convicts. Their presentations are seen from viewing platforms surrounding the exercise yard. At the jail, visitors can have their pictures taken with the inmates. They can also buy souvenir prison shirts. A research student from The Netherlands, Anne Yzerman, attended one of the two-hour shows and praised the convicts. "They are so good at dancing all the time. I was really impressed." The CPDRC inmates dance numbers include a rendition of Bonnie Tyler's "Holding Out for a Hero". The performance involves the inmates holding portraits of figures such as the Dalai Lama, Pope John Paul II and Mahatma Gandhi.

After Michael Jackson's death on June 25, 2009, Cebu prison officials announced that the prison inmates would be recreating the Thriller routine on the following Saturday, June 27, 2009. On June 27, 2009, the tribute video was uploaded with a dance routine for "Ben", "I'll Be There", and "We Are the World". In January 2010, the prisoners performed "The Drill" and "They Don't Care About Us" (filmed on professional camera) as another tribute to Jackson, and for the release of the Michael Jackson's This Is It DVD and Blu-ray disc. In 2011, in the Glee episode "The Sue Sylvester Shuffle", Glee club director Will Schuester made a reference about the "Thriller" viral video to motivate the children to do a "Thriller" performance much like from the Philippine prison.
