= Daniel Celebre =

Canadian dancer

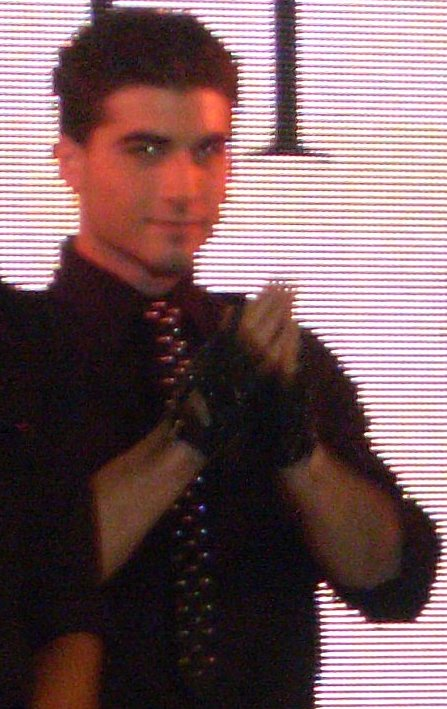
- Celebre at This Is It launch in HMV, February 22, 2010
- Born: Daniel Celebre; 1984; Nobleton, Ontario, Canada
- Occupation(s): Dancer and actor
- Years active: 2000–present

Daniel Celebre (born 1984) is a Canadian dancer.

== Career ==
Celebre (pronounced "Chellibray"), also known as Da FunkyMystic, was inspired to dance professionally by Michael Jackson's performances. He started dancing at age 4 and acting at 17 and, besides performing in dances, his credits also include TV commercials and Honey in 2003 and The Lizzie McGuire Movie.

Celebre was hired as a principal dancer for Michael Jackson's This Is It concert residency that was cancelled 18 days before its first show when Jackson died on June 25, 2009. He also appears prominently in the ensuing This Is It film also released in 2009. He was also featured on The Ellen DeGeneres Show with dancer Shannon Holtzapffel and appeared with the Top 10 Michael Jackson dancers Nicholas Bass, Mekia Cox, Christopher Grant, Misha Gabriel, Shannon Holtzapffel, Devin Jamieson, Charles Klapow, Dres Reid, Danielle Rueda Watts, Tyne Stecklein, Timor Steffens.

In the Philippines, Celebre alongside Travis Payne and Dres Reid took part in a collective dance to "They Don't Care About Us" with intro from "Bad" with Cebu Provincial Detention and Rehabilitation Center's CPDRC Dancing Inmates on January 19, 2010. The dance was specially choreographed by Payne, the Michael Jackson choreographer and associate director of This Is It through an initiative of "Sony Pictures Home Entertainment". The clip went live on YouTube, Yahoo and TMZ and immediately captured more than 3 million views within 1 week of its release online.

== Filmography ==
- 2000: The Other Me as actor/dancer (TV)
- 2003: The Lizzie McGuire Movie as dancer
- 2003: Honey as dancer
- 2008: Camp Rock as actor/dancer (TV)
- 2009: This Is It as dancer
