= Filipino American dance =

Dances produced and performed by Filipino Americans have long been a staple within the Filipino American community as an art form which has been used to educate others on culture, national identity, and community as a whole. This art form is an example of a commentary set forth by Filipino Americans and embodies many important issues, such as nationalism, orientalism, as well as the historical and modern origins of both Filipinos and Filipino Americans. From this commentary emerged the Pilipino Cultural Night or PCN as it is commonly abbreviated, in which the focus was placed on Filipino Students and their communities.

== History of Filipino Americans in dance ==
=== Taxi dance halls ===
Taxi dance halls were areas where dancers, mainly young women referred to as taxi dancers, were paid to dance with patrons who were usually male. During the 1920s and the 1930s, dance halls were incredibly popular among immigrant men. It was in these dance halls that the dancing skills of Filipinos were noted as splendid and exemplary. It was common to see many of the period's most popular dances being performed here, dances such as the Lindy Hop, swing, shimmy and more. The way in which Filipino dancers presented themselves was also a demonstration of the Filipino assimilation within American society. Taxi dance halls were one of the few environments in which Filipinos and Americans were given the opportunity to socialize with one another. As a result of this social interaction, it was also common to see anti-Filipino sentiment in these dance halls as at this time period was the Tydings–McDuffie Act in 1934.

=== Bayanihan National Folk Dance Company ===
Known for their performances during the 1950s and 1960s, Bayanihan National Folk Dance Company became one of the pioneers in the performing of Filipino cultural dance. Their performances sought to bring to light the Philippines and its many resources, as well as distributing what they call "cultural visibility" through dance in order to discover potential trade partners. Their performances have been well documented and distributed throughout the Filipino community, acting as an important resource for those who wish to teach and perform traditional Filipino dances.

=== Pilipino Cultural Nights ===
PCNs began as a method for students that wished to accurately express their cultural backgrounds. They were highly influenced by many of the performances from the Bayanihan National Folk Dance Company. Classic folktales originating from the Philippines were adapted to not only display historical culture, but also as a way to spotlight particular current events. The PCN was a way to bring to light Filipino American history, which had typically been overlooked by many.

==== Features of Pilipino Cultural Nights ====
A main focus of PCNs was the valuing of presentation over participation. Within the performances contained distinct costumes worn by performers, adequate lighting, sometimes live instruments being played by musicians and more. The program was often dictated in both English and Tagalog to appease to the bilingual crowd the event drew in. Often folkloric dances were featured where students explored fashion and transnationalism within the context of Filipino American identity. Skits presented within the program had a tendency to draw comparisons to the experiences of Filipino Americans, such as traditional views of parents, homophobia, domestic violence, and more important representations of Fil-Am experiences.

== Filipino Americans in modern dancing ==
=== Cebu Provincial Detention and Rehabilitation Center ===
One such example of modern dance making its way into Philippine culture is the viral video of the 1,500+ inmates from Cebu Provincial Detention and Rehabilitation Center reenacting the zombie dance from Michael Jackson's "Thriller" video.
