= Happy Jail =

2019 docuseries on Netflix

- Genre: Docuseries
- No. of seasons: 1
- No. of episodes: 5

Original release
- Release: August 14, 2019

Happy Jail is a documentary television series. The premise revolves around an ex-convict becoming the manager of the Philippine jail CPDRC in Cebu province known for a viral Michael Jackson dance video in 2007.

== Release ==
Happy Jail was released on August 14, 2019, on Netflix.

== Episodes ==
No.	Title	Directed by	Original release date
1	"A Happy Jail for Happy Inmates"	Michele Josue	August 14, 2019
2	"Everybody Needs a Second Chance"	Michele Josue	August 14, 2019
3	"I Dream"	Michele Josue	August 14, 2019
4	"A Free Man"	Michele Josue	August 14, 2019
5	"No Dance Killing, Man"	Michele Josue	August 14, 2019
