= Michael Jackson's This Is It (album) =

Soundtrack album by Michael Jackson
- Released: October 26, 2009
- Recorded: 1978–2009
- Length: 77:57 (disc one); 14:24 (disc two)
- Labels: Epic; Sony; MJJ
- Producers: Michael Jackson; Quincy Jones; Bill Bottrell; Teddy Riley; Dave Way; The Jacksons; John McClain; Mervyn Warren

Michael Jackson chronology
The Remix Suite (2009)	Michael Jackson's This Is It (2009)	Michael (2010)

Michael Jackson's This Is It (or simply This Is It) is a posthumous two-disc soundtrack album by American singer Michael Jackson. Released by MJJ Music on October 26, 2009, This Is It features previously released music, as well as six previously unreleased recordings by Jackson. This Is It was released to coincide with the theatrical release of Michael Jackson's This Is It, a concert film documenting Jackson's rehearsals for the This Is It concert series at the O2 Arena in London. This Is It is the sixth album to be released by Sony and Motown/Universal since Jackson's death on June 25, 2009.

This Is It debuted at number one in 14 countries, including the United States, Canada, Japan, Italy, and France. This Is It also peaked within the top 10 of the charts in several other nations. This Is It has been certified gold, platinum, or double-platinum in multiple countries. This Is It was the 12th best-selling album of 2009 in the United States and the third best-selling album of 2009 based on worldwide sales. By March 2010, the soundtrack had sold 5 million copies globally. The title track from the album, "This Is It", earned Jackson a nomination in 2011 for Best Male Pop Vocal Performance at the 53rd Annual Grammy Awards.

== Background and concept ==
Michael Jackson died at the age of 50 on June 25, 2009, from cardiac arrest (it would later be determined that Jackson died of "acute propofol intoxication" with the additional factor of "benzodiazepine effect"). Prior to his death, Jackson was planning on performing 50 concerts for his sold-out This Is It comeback shows in London at the O2 Arena from July 13, 2009, to March 6, 2010. Shortly after his death, on June 25, 2009, Sony Music Entertainment announced that they were to release a two-disc compilation "soundtrack" for Jackson's concert documentary film, Michael Jackson's This Is It. In the announcement it was confirmed that This Is It would be released on October 26, 2009, one day before the film's theatrical release. This Is It is the sixth posthumous album to be released by Sony and Motown/Universal since Jackson's death in June 2009. The previous five albums are The Collection, Hello World: The Motown Solo Collection, The Stripped Mixes, The Definitive Collection, and The Remix Suite. This Is It was released on Sony Music's Epic Records, though, in certain countries, This Is It is listed under Sony Music Entertainment. The album was made available for pre-order – on Amazon as a compact disc and on the iTunes Store as a digital download. As planned, This Is It was released on October 26, 2009, in the US and worldwide on October 27. Currently, the CD is only available to order from Amazon.com by members of the Amazon Prime service. A limited-edition tenth-anniversary box set of the album was released on December 11, 2019.

== Music ==
"This Is It"
A 21-second sample of Michael Jackson's "This Is It". In 1980 Jackson recorded a demo version of the song, which he had co-written with Paul Anka. After Jackson's death, his brothers found Jackson's demo version and added their voices and multiple instruments into the background.

The press release announcing the two-disc album describes it as a "stand-alone companion" to the motion picture. This Is It was released as a two-disc compilation album. The first disc consists of 16 tracks, 14 of which were already released on Jackson's previous studio albums: Thriller (1982), Bad (1987), Dangerous (1991) and HIStory (1995), and one from The Jacksons' album Destiny (1978). The album does not include any of the songs from Off the Wall (1979) or Invincible (2001), although a demo version of "She's Out of My Life" is featured on the second disc. Fourteen of the already released tracks were arranged in order of how they would have appeared on the This Is It setlist and how they appeared in the concert film. On September 23, 2009, Sony Music Entertainment announced that it would release the song "This Is It" as a single to promote both the album and film. However, shortly after "This Is It"'s digital debut on MichaelJackson.com, it was confirmed that the single's planned physical release was canceled.

This Is It contains previously unreleased music by Michael Jackson, which consists of demos and instrumental versions of his songs. The first disc contains "This Is It", which was written by Michael Jackson and Paul Anka in 1980; the song had originally been planned as a duet between the two for Anka's Walk a Fine Line album. After Michael Jackson's death, his brothers found a demo of Michael Jackson's version of the song, described as a "bare bone" recording. They added their voices and instruments into the background of the track. Two versions of "This Is It" were added to the album; the original and an orchestra version that is over one minute longer. The second disc consists of four unreleased versions of Michael Jackson's classic hits. The disc contains three demo versions of Michael Jackson's "She's Out of My Life" (1979), "Wanna Be Startin' Somethin'" (1982) and "Beat It" (1982). The disc's fourth track is a spoken word poem by Jackson, entitled "Planet Earth", which was already published in the liner notes of Michael Jackson's 1991 album Dangerous.

== Reception ==
=== Critical reception ===
Professional ratings
Review scores
Source	Rating
AllMusic	2.5/5 stars
Consequence of Sound	4.5/5 stars
Entertainment Weekly	(B+)
IGN	(8.9)
The Independent	1/5 stars
Rolling Stone	4/5 stars
Newsday	(favorable)
The Times	2/5 stars

Upon its release, This Is It received mixed to positive reviews from music critics. Simon Vozick-Levinson of Entertainment Weekly, praised the album and gave it an overall rating of a B+. Vozick-Levinson described the album's track "This Is It" as being an "uplifting ballad" and felt that "if you're feeling generous" you can "count the minimally distinguishable" orchestra version of "This Is It" having thought of it as being a "decent if slight addition to Jackson's songbook." Vozick-Levinson stated that while the album's second disc only contains four tracks that were unreleased, that included a "fairly unremarkable" spoken-word poem, after hearing Jackson "work out the vocal harmonies" for "Beat It," he, in particular, felt that This Is It was "well worth the price of admission (or at least a healthy chunk of it)." Brian Linder of IGN described This Is It as a "freshly designed" release of a greatest hits album, and that the album's tracks of an all-vocal arrangement of "Beat It" was "particularly awesome" and the acoustic version of "She's Out of My Life" allows Jackson's "vocals to shine without the distraction of dated '70s musical underpinnings." Linder did note that he felt that the album was both a "fitting tribute" to Jackson and a "crass, commercial double-dip."

Will Hines of Consequence of Sound gave This Is It a rating of four and a half out of five stars. Hines commented that, "On one level [of the album], it's an attempt to focus and draw attention to what Michael Jackson lived for, and not what he did. On a more superficial level, this is Sony milking his legacy. Any true MJ fan will already own 90% of the songs that make up this two-disc set. It is, however, that 10% which justifies this album's existence."

Negative reviews from critics were mainly centered around them feeling that the album was released only for profit. Stephen Thomas Erlewine of AllMusic gave This Is It two and a half out of five stars. Erlewine commented, "An important thing to remember when considering the soundtrack to This Is It: this entire film and CD project was never supposed to happen." He noted that Jackson's death had "created considerable demand" for his final rehearsal footage and that This Is It was an "accompaniment" to the film. Andy Gill of The Independent strongly criticized This Is It describing it as being a "shoddy apology for an album" and felt that it was made just for a profit, commenting,

As a cash-in attempt to scrape as much money from fans' memories with as little outlay as possible, however, it rivals RCA's ruthless (and still ongoing) reconfigurations of Elvis Presley's back catalogue. But then, what should one expect from Jackson's executors? His own father's immediate reaction to Michael's death seemed to involve the promotion of his own label, while his brothers quickly grabbed the opportunity to scour through a box of tapes and find a tepid old track not previously deemed worthy of release and add their own vocals to it (before taking the trouble to find out it was co-written by Paul Anka, who understandably sought remuneration for his work). Who, exactly, stands to gain from this? Not the fans, that's for sure. In the four months since his death, Sony and Motown/Universal between them have issued no fewer than five posthumous album packages: The Collection, Hello World, The Stripped Mixes, The Remix Suite, and now This Is It. That's a busy promotion schedule for a dead man. At some point, presumably, he will be left to rest in peace.

=== Commercial performance ===
This Is It debuted at number one on the Billboard 200, selling 373,000 copies in its first week according to Nielsen SoundScan. The album had the fifth-best sales week for an album in the United States in 2009. This Is It, which also debuted at number one on Billboards Soundtrack chart, marked Jackson's sixth number one entry on the chart. This Is It slightly outsold Jackson's first-week sales of his previous album Invincible which sold 366,300 units in 2001. This Is It's chart performance tied Jackson with several other artists for the most number-one albums on the Billboard 200 chart; among the solo male artists, Jackson currently is tied with Garth Brooks for second place with 51 entries. Jackson's This Is It album was the twelfth best-selling of 2009, having sold an estimated 1.29 million units in nine weeks. It has sold a total of 1,735,000 copies in the US as of August 2013. Its video is also being sold as USB flash drive by Kingston Company, first time ever in the company's history, according to a deal done with Sony Music, published as Limited Edition.

Internationally, This Is It had similar commercial reception. The album was released worldwide on October 26 and October 27, 2009, and debuted at number one in 14 countries. The 14 countries include Italy, France, Sweden and the Netherlands, the album stayed at number one in the Netherlands for two consecutive weeks. Other countries where This Is It didn't debut or peak at number one were, placing at number two, Denmark, Australia and Switzerland, placing at number three, Norway and the United Kingdom, placing at four in Germany and sixth in Ireland. In the album's second week of release its chart positions saw both an increase and decrease. This Is It increased from four to three in Germany and sixth to fifth in Ireland while it held onto its second and third positions in Switzerland and Norway respectively. By its third week of release, the album went on to peak at number three in Ireland. This Is It sold 78,000 units in its first week of release in the United Kingdom.

This Is It has received multiple certifications since its release from different countries worldwide; although sales per certificate vary per country. Four days after This Is It's release in the United Kingdom, it was certified gold for 100,000 units sold on October 30, and platinum for 300,000 units sold on November 27, 2009. The album was certified 2× platinum by Recording Industry Association of America (RIAA) on December 4, 2009. This Is It was certified Platinum by the Australian Recording Industry Association for the shipment of over 70,000 units in Australia. The album was also certified Gold by the Canadian Recording Industry Association for the sales of over 40,000 units in Canada and was certified 3× Platinum by the Federation of the Italian Music Industry for the sales of over 210,000 units in Italy, as well as 2× Platinum by the Recording Industry Association of New Zealand for the sales of over 30,000 units in New Zealand. It was the third best-selling album of 2009 based on worldwide sales. By March 2010, the soundtrack had sold 5 million copies globally.

=== Accolades ===
The title track, "This Is It", earned Jackson a posthumous Grammy nomination in 2011 for Best Male Pop Vocal Performance at the 53rd Annual Grammy Awards.

== Track listing ==
Disc 1
No.	Title	Writer(s)	Original album	Length
1.	"Wanna Be Startin' Somethin'"	Michael Jackson	Thriller, 1982	6:03
2.	"Jam"	Michael Jackson, René Moore, Bruce Swedien, Teddy Riley	Dangerous, 1991	5:39
3.	"They Don't Care About Us"	Michael Jackson	HIStory, 1995	4:45
4.	"Human Nature"	Steve Porcaro, John Bettis	Thriller, 1982	4:06
5.	"Smooth Criminal"	Michael Jackson	Bad, 1987	4:18
6.	"The Way You Make Me Feel"	Michael Jackson	Bad, 1987	4:59
7.	"Shake Your Body (Down to the Ground)" (7" version) (performed by The Jacksons)	Michael Jackson, Randy Jackson	Destiny, 1978	3:47
8.	"I Just Can't Stop Loving You" (featuring Siedah Garrett)	Michael Jackson	Bad, 1987	4:13
9.	"Thriller"	Rod Temperton	Thriller, 1982	5:58
10.	"Beat It" (from Thriller, 1982)	Michael Jackson	Thriller, 1982	4:18
11.	"Black or White" (featuring Bill Bottrell)	Michael Jackson	Dangerous, 1991	4:17
12.	"Earth Song"	Michael Jackson	HIStory, 1995	6:47
13.	"Billie Jean"	Michael Jackson	Thriller, 1982	4:55
14.	"Man in the Mirror"	Siedah Garrett, Glen Ballard	Bad, 1987	5:21
15.	"This Is It"	Michael Jackson, Paul Anka	previously unreleased	3:38
16.	"This Is It" (orchestra version)	Michael Jackson, Paul Anka	previously unreleased	4:56
Total length:				77:57

Disc 2
No.	Title	Writer(s)	Length
1.	"She's Out of My Life" (demo)	Tom Bahler	3:20
2.	"Wanna Be Startin' Somethin'" (demo)	Michael Jackson	5:44
3.	"Beat It" (demo)	Michael Jackson	2:04
4.	"Planet Earth" (poem)	Michael Jackson	3:15
Total length:			14:24

Selections from Michael Jackson's This Is It EP
No.	Title	Writer(s)	Length
1.	"This Is It"	Michael Jackson, Paul Anka	3:38
2.	"This Is It" (orchestra version)	Michael Jackson, Paul Anka	4:56
3.	"She's Out of My Life" (demo)	Tom Bahler	3:20
4.	"Wanna Be Startin' Somethin'" (demo)	Michael Jackson	5:44
5.	"Beat It" (demo)	Michael Jackson	2:04
6.	"Planet Earth" (poem)	Michael Jackson	3:15
Total length:			22:12

Notes

- The two versions of "This Is It" along with the second disc contents are available separately as the digital-only EP Selections from Michael Jackson's This Is It.
- "Smooth Criminal" is excluded from the China release.
- Despite that a sticker on the album claims all songs on the album are in their original full-length album versions, "Shake Your Body (Down to the Ground)" is included in its 7" edit version.
- An eco-friendly version sold only at Walmart includes only the first disc.

== Charts ==
=== Weekly charts ===
Chart (2009)	Peak position
Australian Albums (ARIA)	2
Austrian Albums (Ö3 Austria)	2
Belgian Albums (Ultratop Flanders)	1
Belgian Albums (Ultratop Wallonia)	1
Canadian Albums (Billboard)	1
Czech Albums (ČNS IFPI)	2
Danish Albums (Hitlisten)	2
Dutch Albums (Album Top 100)	1
European Albums Chart	1
Finnish Albums (Suomen virallinen lista)	11
French Albums (SNEP)	1
German Albums (Offizielle Top 100)	3
Hungarian Albums (MAHASZ)	1
Icelandic Albums (Tónlistinn)	3
Irish Albums (IRMA)	3
Italian Albums (FIMI)	1
Japanese Albums (Oricon)	1
Mexican Albums (AMPROFON)	3
New Zealand Albums (RMNZ)	1
Norwegian Albums (VG-lista)	3
Polish Albums Chart	7
Portuguese Albums (AFP)	2
Scottish Albums (Official Charts)	5
Spanish Albums (Promusicae)	3
Swedish Albums (Sverigetopplistan)	1
Swiss Albums (Schweizer Hitparade)	2
UK Albums (Official Charts)	3
US Billboard 200	1
US Top R&B/Hip-Hop Albums (Billboard)	1
US Soundtrack Albums (Billboard)	1

=== Year-end charts ===
Chart (2009)	Position
Australian Albums (ARIA)	26
Austrian Albums (Ö3 Austria)	38
Belgian Albums (Ultratop Flanders)	12
Belgian Albums (Ultratop Wallonia)	26
Canadian Albums (Billboard)	30
Czech Albums (ČNS IFPI)	14
Dutch Albums (Album Top 100)	12
French Albums (SNEP)	14
German Albums (Offizielle Top 100)	64
Mexican Albums (AMPROFON)	100
New Zealand Albums (RMNZ)	10
Swedish Albums (Sverigetopplistan)	9
Swiss Albums (Schweizer Hitparade)	28
UK Albums (OCC)	24
US Billboard 200	43
US Top R&B/Hip-Hop Albums (Billboard)	47
US Soundtrack Albums (Billboard)	4

Chart (2010)	Position
Austrian Albums (Ö3 Austria)	56
Belgian Albums (Ultratop Flanders)	2
Belgian Albums (Ultratop Wallonia)	12
Canadian Albums (Billboard)	19
Dutch Albums (Album Top 100)	30
French Albums (SNEP)	43
German Albums (Offizielle Top 100)	85
Japanese Albums (Oricon)	55
New Zealand Albums (RMNZ)	46
Spanish Albums (PROMUSICAE)	21
Swedish Albums (Sverigetopplistan)	58
Swiss Albums (Schweizer Hitparade)	34
UK Albums (OCC)	183
US Billboard 200	22
US Top R&B/Hip-Hop Albums (Billboard)	8
US Soundtrack Albums (Billboard)	1

Chart (2011)	Position
US Top R&B/Hip-Hop Albums (Billboard)	100

== Certifications ==
Region	Certification	Certified units/sales
Australia (ARIA)	Platinum	70,000^{^}
Austria (IFPI Austria)	Platinum	20,000^{*}
Belgium (BRMA)	2× Platinum	60,000^{*}
Canada (Music Canada)	5× Platinum	400,000^{^}
Denmark (IFPI Danmark)	Platinum	30,000^{^}
Finland (Musiikkituottajat)	Gold	10,460
GCC (IFPI Middle East)	Platinum	6,000^{*}
Germany (BVMI)	3× Gold	300,000^{‡}
Greece (IFPI Greece)	Platinum	6,000^{^}
Hungary (MAHASZ)	2× Platinum	12,000^{^}
Ireland (IRMA)	Platinum	15,000^{^}
Italy (FIMI)	4× Platinum	280,000^{*}
Japan (RIAJ)	Platinum	250,000^{^}
Mexico (AMPROFON)	Gold	30,000^{^}
Netherlands (NVPI) video	Platinum	50,000^{^}
New Zealand (RMNZ)	2× Platinum	30,000^{^}
Poland (ZPAV)	Platinum	20,000^{*}
Russia (NFPF)	Platinum	20,000^{*}
Sweden (GLF)	Platinum	40,000^{‡}
Spain (Promusicae)	Platinum	60,000^{^}
United Kingdom (BPI)	2× Platinum	600,000^{‡}
United States (RIAA)	2× Platinum	2,000,000^{^}
Summaries
Europe (IFPI)	Platinum	1,000,000^{*}
^{*} Sales figures based on certification alone.^{^} Shipments figures based on certification alone.^{‡} Sales+streaming figures based on certification alone.

== Release history ==
List of release dates, showing country or region, record label, and format
Region	Date	Label	Format
United States	October 26, 2009	Epic	CD; digital download; LP
Canada	October 26, 2009	Sony Music	CD; digital download; LP
Australia	October 26, 2009	Sony Music	CD; digital download; LP
Germany	October 26, 2009	Sony Music	CD; digital download; LP
Greece	October 26, 2009	Sony Music	CD; digital download; LP
Austria	October 27, 2009	Sony Music	CD; digital download; LP
Italy	October 27, 2009	Sony Music	CD; digital download; LP
Turkey	October 27, 2009	Sony Music	CD; digital download; LP
Hong Kong	October 27, 2009	Sony Music	CD; digital download; LP
Japan	October 28, 2009	Sony Music Japan	CD; digital download; LP
China	December 1, 2009	Sony Music China	CD

== See also ==
- List of music released posthumously
