= Algorithm March =

The Algorithm March (アルゴリズムこうしん, Arugorizomu Kōshin) is a dance fad created in Japan, based on the children's television series PythagoraSwitch which was broadcast on the educational channel of NHK, a Japanese non-profit public broadcasting service. It is performed by the comedy group Itsumo Kokokara with variable groups (it differs at each air) such as firefighters, soccer players, Yasugi-bushi preservation society, Vienna Boys' Choir, Blue Man Group, ninja and so on.

== Description ==
The basic steps are as follows, repeating as necessary:

1. Bend knees, reach out straight with hands
2. Lean back with arms akimbo ("big shot")
3. Turn around, bow
4. Face right, right hand horizon sweep
5. Bend knees, breaststroke
6. Bend down and pretend to pick up a chestnut from the ground
7. Shake arms downwards, like pumping a bicycle tire
8. Flap arms as though being inflated by a pump

The dance can be performed in lines, moving canon style one at a time. After each movement, the line takes a step forward.
