= This Is It (residency) =

Cancelled Michael Jackson concerts

- Residency by Michael Jackson
- The initial banner of the concert residency with original dates shown
- Location: London, England
- Venue: The O2 Arena
- Start date: July 13, 2009 (scheduled)
- End date: March 6, 2010 (scheduled)
- Legs: 2 (both canceled)
- No. of shows: 50 (all canceled)
- Website: Official website

Michael Jackson concert chronology
- Michael Jackson: Live at the Apollo 2002 (2002); This Is It (2009–2010)

This Is It was a planned concert residency by American singer Michael Jackson, scheduled to take place at the O2 Arena in London, England, between July 13, 2009, and March 6, 2010. The concerts were canceled following Jackson's death on June 25, 2009, 18 days before the first scheduled performance.

Jackson announced This Is It at a press conference at the O2 Arena on March 5 and said it would be his final series of concerts in London. AEG Live, the concert promoters, released a promotional video that used an entire commercial break on ITV, setting an ITV record. Initially, only 10 concerts were announced, but 40 more were added following public demand. Ticket sales broke several records and Jackson's album sales increased following the announcement. More than 1.5 million fans caused two sites offering pre-sale tickets to crash within minutes of going online. In the span of four hours, 750,000 tickets were sold. Two million people tried to buy pre-sale tickets in the span of 18 hours. AEG Live estimated that the first 10 concerts would have earned Jackson approximately £50 million.

In preparation for the concert series, Jackson had collaborated with figures including fashion designer Christian Audigier, choreographer Kenny Ortega, and retired two-time Mr. Olympia champion bodybuilder Lou Ferrigno. Prior to his death, Allgood Entertainment sued him for $40 million, claiming that he had breached an exclusivity agreement by agreeing to the additional This Is It concerts; the case was dismissed.

After Jackson's death, AEG Live offered either refunds to ticket holders or a special "souvenir" ticket designed by Jackson. The canceled shows, their record-breaking ticket sales, and the potential there was for a world tour led to This Is It being described as "the greatest concert[s] that never happened". Columbia Pictures acquired the footage of the rehearsals and released a documentary film, Michael Jackson's This Is It, accompanied by a soundtrack album.

== Announcement ==
Jackson announced This Is It at a press conference at the O2 Arena in London on March 5, 2009. The conference was attended by fans from several countries and 350 journalists. He told the crowd: "This is it. When I say this is it, it really means this is it. This is the final curtain call." Immediately after the conference, a statement confirmed that Jackson would play 10 shows at the London O2 Arena, "performing in London for the last time". The statement promised "an explosive return with a band of the highest calibre, a state-of-the-art stage show and incredible surprise support acts".

Jackson had not toured since the HIStory World Tour, since 1997 and had not recorded a new album since 2001. In 2005, he was acquitted of child sexual abuse charges, and kept out of the public eye in the years following. Reports circulated that he was facing financial problems; he had closed his iconic Neverland Ranch residence and auctioned more than 2,000 possessions. The Independent reported that "for a man who has been absent for 10 years from the stage, after a messy court battle to shake off the paedophilia charges, a reputed cash crisis and the loss of his ranch, Michael Jackson looked surprisingly rehabilitated".

Hours before the press conference, promotional posters for the residency were displayed around London. Further promotion took up an entire commercial break period on ITV London during Dancing on Ice, the first time this has ever happened for a musical artist. The advert, which cost £1 million to air, was viewed by 11 million people.

The shows, Jackson's first significant concert events since the 30th Anniversary Celebration in 2001, had been deemed one of the year's most important musical events. Randy Phillips, president and chief executive of AEG Live, stated that the first 10 dates would earn Jackson approximately £50 million (about US$80.1 million). The Guardian characterized the concerts as an "astonishing comeback for a man who in recent years has been dogged by controversy", adding that Jackson still had "enormous commercial clout". The Evening Standard stated that the deal was the "showbiz coup of the decade" for AEG Live, while The Independent remarked that the finalized 50 concerts would provide London with a "much-needed" economic boost. Joe Cohen, chief executive of Seatwave, told BBC 6 Music that the shows would generate £1 billion for the economy.

== Response ==
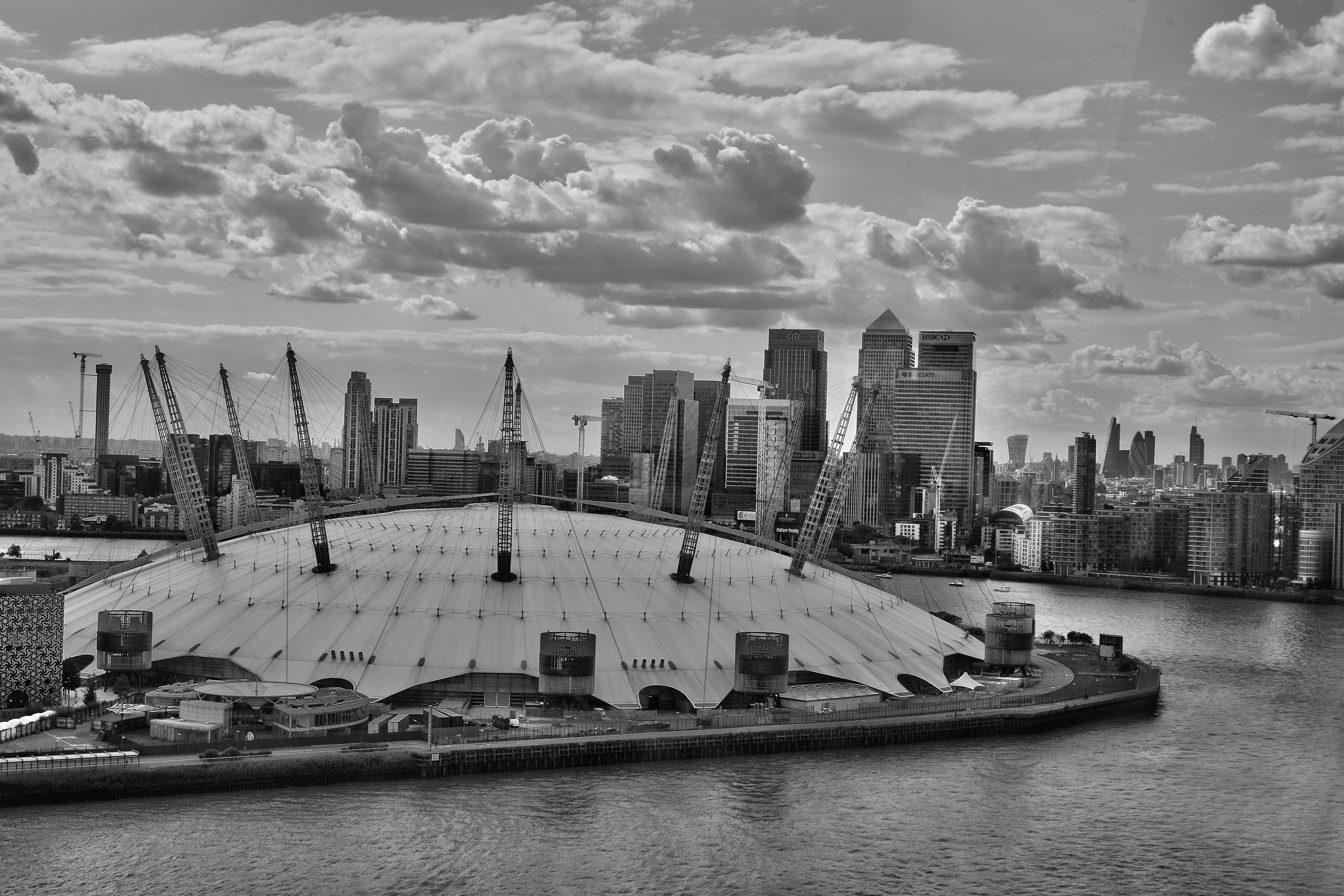
The O2 Arena, where the concerts would have been held

Sales of Jackson's albums increased following the press conference. Some websites offered early tickets, which the Association of Secondary Ticket Agents warned were fake. Jackson's website allowed fans to register early for a "pre-sale" draw. The website was not able to deal with the number of registrations—reportedly up to 16,000 applications a second. In the space of 24 hours, nearly a million people from around the world registered for pre-sale tickets, enough to fill the venue 50 times over. Tickets that had not even been printed were selling on auction website eBay for £300.

The two-day pre-sale began on March 11, and 40 extra dates were added to meet high demand; five dates were reserved in their entirety for the public sale. More than 1.5 million fans caused two sites offering pre-sale tickets to crash within minutes of going online. In the space of four hours, 750,000 tickets were sold. Two million people tried to buy pre-sale tickets in the space of 18 hours. Veronica Schmidt of The Times said that "Michael Jackson has floored his critics", while organizers proclaimed it a "cultural phenomenon".

Jackson was set to break the record for number of shows performed by an artist at a single venue, which had been set by Prince, who hosted the Earth Tour: 21 Nights in London concert residency at the same arena in 2007. According to Jackson's website, the following records were or would have been broken: "The biggest audience ever to see an artist in one city", "The greatest number of people to attend a series of arena shows", "The fastest ticket sales in history". Randy Phillips acknowledged that Jackson could have sold out even more dates, but this would have conflicted with other career plans. On March 13, the other 50% of seats for dates 1–45 and all the seats for dates 46–50 went on sale to the general public. Within four hours, all 50 dates had sold out. At this stage, the sales of his compilation album King of Pop (2008) were up 400% and the sales of Thriller (1982) were up 200%. Tickets appeared on eBay for as much as £10,000.

The residency was scheduled to start on July 13, 2009, and end on March 6, 2010. The concert series was originally going to be 10 shows starting on July 8, 2009, but it was expanded on March 12 to 50 shows. Approximately 750,000 people would have attended all fifty shows.

== Litigation ==
In June 2009, concert promoter Allgood Entertainment, represented by Ira Meyerowitz and Jon Kekielek of MJlawfirm, sued Jackson for $40 million. He claimed that Jackson, through his manager Frank DiLeo, had agreed to a single and a $30 million reunion concert with the Jackson 5 and his sister Janet. According to the concert promoter, the alleged contractual agreement prevented Jackson from performing elsewhere before the reunion concert and for a three-month period after it. Thus, agreeing to a 50-date residency at the O2 Arena was an alleged breach of the Allgood Entertainment contract. The filing company stated that AEG Live knew of the alleged agreement with Jackson and used their dominance in the industry to coerce Jackson into agreeing to the residency. In August 2010, the judge dismissed the case, stating that there was no evidence of a binding agreement, no contracts were signed. The case was in limbo as of 2013.

== Preparation and concert details ==
The 50-concert run was scheduled to start on July 8, 2009 and conclude on February 24, 2010. Each of the shows would have been performed at the O2 Arena in London, to approximately 15,000 people per show; approximately a total of 750,000 people would have been attended all 50 shows. New York designer Zaldy was head costumer. Jay Ruckel of La Crasia Gloves recreated Jackson's iconic single glove. The costumes were encrusted with 300,000 Swarovski crystals. From April 13–15, 2009, more than 700 dancers auditioned for Jackson, who helped select the 11 finalists. Kenny Ortega, who had collaborated with Jackson previously, was to work on the overall design and direction of concerts. Ortega said that the final product would have been a "theatrical musical experience". According to Randy Phillips, $20 million was to be spent on producing the concerts, which would have included 18–22 songs and 22 different sets. There also would have been aerial dancing similar to routines by Cirque du Soleil. Carla Ferrigno told Reuters that her husband, Lou Ferrigno, had been helping Jackson train in advance of the shows. Jackson and Ferrigno had previously worked together.

On May 20, 2009, it was announced that the first concert would be postponed five days to July 13, and three other July 2009 dates would be postponed to March 2010. AEG Live said that the delay was necessary because more time was needed for dress rehearsals. The revised schedule called for 27 shows between July 13 and September 29, 2009, followed by a three-month break, before resuming in the new year with 23 more shows between January 7 and March 6, 2010. Some fans petitioned for the reversal of AEG Live's decision. On June 24, 2009, several hundred seats for each show went on sale. These seats were held back until production logistics were finalized.

It was suggested that after the London concerts, Jackson might head to Australia, Europe, India, China, Hong Kong, Japan and North America. Randy Phillips, the CEO of AEG Live, told the LA Times that Australia was part of Michael Jackson's international tour plans.

== Cancellation ==
On June 25, 2009, 18 days before This Is It was due to begin, Jackson died after suffering cardiac arrest caused by an overdose of propofol and benzodiazepines by Murray. AEG Live, faced a liability of up to £300 million and an empty venue for the next nine months. The O2 Arena stated that full refunds, including all ticket service charges, would be available to those who purchased tickets through authorized agents, and that fans would also have the option to receive the tickets as souvenirs instead of a refund. Fans who bought their tickets from private sellers potentially faced problems. eBay recommended that purchasers contact their sellers for refunds and stated that those who used PayPal could get refunds if the purchase was made during the last 45 days. PayPal later announced that all ticket buyers would receive a full refund.

== Documentary and album ==
Following Jackson's death, AEG stated that they had "more than 100 hours of footage of preparations and rehearsals for the shows". On August 10, 2009, Los Angeles Superior Court Judge Mitchell Beckloff approved a deal between film distributor Columbia Pictures and AEG Live for the former company to purchase and distribute rehearsal footage of Jackson for a film entitled Michael Jackson's This Is It. According to court documents, Columbia paid $60 million (£35 million) for rights to the rehearsal footage. The papers filed in court had reportedly stated that Jackson's estate will get 90% of the profits and that AEG Live will get the remaining 10% from the film's revenue. The film was directed by Kenny Ortega who was also the director of the live concert. It was compiled mostly from footage that was shot as reference for production discussions and was never meant to be shown publicly. Some of the music and vocals in the film were added from previous recordings, though most were from the live performance. The film was released on October 28.

An accompanying album to the film was also released. Titled This Is It, the compilation was distributed internationally on October 26, and to North America the following day. The two-disc album features music "inspired from the documentary of the same name". Of the album, Sony said, "Disc one will feature the original album masters of some of Michael's biggest hits arranged in the same sequence as they appear in the film" and stated that "the disc ends with two versions of the 'never-released' 'This Is It' [...] This song is featured in the film's closing sequence and includes backing vocals by Michael's brothers and Alvin Chea of take 6." Sony added that the second disc will feature previously unreleased versions from Jackson's "catalogue of hits", along with a spoken word poem entitled "Planet Earth" and a 36-page commemorative booklet with "exclusive photos of Michael from his last rehearsal".

== Rehearsals ==
Rehearsals took place six days per week at three locations in California from April to June 2009. Jackson skipped the June 13 rehearsal due to advice from his doctor Conrad Murray.

On June 19, Michael Jackson was sent home after a costume fitting because he became ill, so he asked Kenny Ortega to oversee the rehearsal instead of practicing. Ortega agreed and gave him a massage on his feet and fed him while he was covered with a blanket and near a heater. Later, he was sent home. This created tension within the production, so a meeting was scheduled at Michael's home the next day.

From mid-April through May 29, rehearsals took place at Center Staging in Burbank. From June 1–20, rehearsals took place at the Forum in Inglewood. From June 22 to 25, rehearsals took place at the Staples Center in downtown Los Angeles. On June 23, Jackson rehearsed "for 90 minutes until nearly midnight on June 23", according to music photographer Kevin Mazur.

On June 24, Jackson met with the production team to finalize some visual elements of the show. Afterwards, he attended a meeting about a planned television special that was scheduled to air on October 31, on CBS, featuring footage of "Thriller" and "Threatened" from the shows. Later, Jackson rehearsed the two songs and "Earth Song". It was Jackson's final performance on stage before his death the next morning.

Prior to Jackson's death, production rehearsals were scheduled to continue at the Staples Center through July 2, before they were scheduled to fly to London the next day. Rehearsals were scheduled to resume at the O2 Arena from July 7–12.

=== List of confirmed rehearsal dates that Michael Jackson attended ===
Date	City	Venue
April 16, 2009	Burbank	CenterStaging
May 6, 2009	Burbank	CenterStaging
May 12, 2009	Burbank	CenterStaging
May 25, 2009	Burbank	CenterStaging
May 29, 2009	Burbank	CenterStaging
June 3, 2009	Inglewood	The Forum
June 4, 2009	Inglewood	The Forum
June 5, 2009	Inglewood	The Forum
June 6, 2009	Inglewood	The Forum
June 16, 2009	Inglewood	The Forum
June 17, 2009	Inglewood	The Forum
June 18, 2009	Inglewood	The Forum
June 19, 2009	Inglewood	The Forum
June 23, 2009	Los Angeles	Staples Center
June 24, 2009	Los Angeles	Staples Center

== Dates ==
List of scheduled concerts
Date	City	Country	Venue
Leg 1
July 13, 2009 (Note: Rescheduled from July 8, 2009.)	London	England	The O2 Arena
July 16, 2009	London	England	The O2 Arena
July 18, 2009	London	England	The O2 Arena
July 22, 2009	London	England	The O2 Arena
July 24, 2009	London	England	The O2 Arena
July 26, 2009	London	England	The O2 Arena
July 28, 2009	London	England	The O2 Arena
July 30, 2009	London	England	The O2 Arena
August 1, 2009	London	England	The O2 Arena
August 3, 2009	London	England	The O2 Arena
August 10, 2009	London	England	The O2 Arena
August 12, 2009	London	England	The O2 Arena
August 17, 2009	London	England	The O2 Arena
August 19, 2009	London	England	The O2 Arena
August 24, 2009	London	England	The O2 Arena
August 26, 2009	London	England	The O2 Arena
August 28, 2009	London	England	The O2 Arena
August 30, 2009	London	England	The O2 Arena
September 1, 2009	London	England	The O2 Arena
September 3, 2009	London	England	The O2 Arena
September 6, 2009	London	England	The O2 Arena
September 8, 2009	London	England	The O2 Arena
September 10, 2009	London	England	The O2 Arena
September 21, 2009	London	England	The O2 Arena
September 23, 2009	London	England	The O2 Arena
September 27, 2009	London	England	The O2 Arena
September 29, 2009	London	England	The O2 Arena
Leg 2
January 7, 2010	London	England	The O2 Arena
January 9, 2010	London	England	The O2 Arena
January 12, 2010	London	England	The O2 Arena
January 14, 2010	London	England	The O2 Arena
January 16, 2010	London	England	The O2 Arena
January 18, 2010	London	England	The O2 Arena
January 23, 2010	London	England	The O2 Arena
January 25, 2010	London	England	The O2 Arena
January 27, 2010	London	England	The O2 Arena
January 29, 2010	London	England	The O2 Arena
February 1, 2010	London	England	The O2 Arena
February 3, 2010	London	England	The O2 Arena
February 8, 2010	London	England	The O2 Arena
February 10, 2010	London	England	The O2 Arena
February 12, 2010	London	England	The O2 Arena
February 16, 2010	London	England	The O2 Arena
February 18, 2010	London	England	The O2 Arena
February 20, 2010	London	England	The O2 Arena
February 22, 2010	London	England	The O2 Arena
February 24, 2010	London	England	The O2 Arena
March 1, 2010 (Note: Rescheduled from July 10, 2009.)	London	England	The O2 Arena
March 3, 2010 (Note: Rescheduled from July 12, 2009.)	London	England	The O2 Arena
March 6, 2010 (Note: Rescheduled from July 14, 2009.)	London	England	The O2 Arena

== Personnel ==
Musicians

- Michael Jackson – vocals, show direction, choreographer
- Orianthi Panagaris – guitar
- Tommy Organ – guitar
- Alex Al – bass, keyboards
- Jonathan Moffett – drums
- Michael Bearden – keyboards, musical director
- Morris Pleasure – keyboards
- Bashiri Johnson – percussion
- Dorian Holley – vocals, vocal direction
- Judith Hill – vocals
- Darryl Phinnessee – vocals
- Ken Stacey – vocals

Dancers

- Michael Jackson
- Daniel Yao
- Nicholas Bass
- Daniel "Da FunkyMystic" Celebre
- Mekia Cox
- Chris "Kriyss" Grant
- Misha Gabriel
- Shannon Holtzapffel
- Devin Jamieson
- Charles Klapow
- Ricardo "Dres" Reid
- Danielle Rueda Watts
- Tyne Stecklein
- Timor "Timor Dance" Steffens

Production and other personnel

- Kenny Ortega – show direction
- Alif Sankey – associate production
- Michael Cotten – production design
- Michael Curry – production design
- Michael Jackson & Travis Payne – choreography
- Stacy Walker – choreography assistance
- Tony Testa – choreography assistance
- Patrick Woodroffe – lighting design
- Hakeem Khaaliq – graphic design, mobile technology integration
- David Elsewhere – dance coaching
- Shahzad Perez – Specialty Act
- Gregg Smith – casting direction
- Karen Faye Heinze – hair and make-up
- Zaldy Goco – chief of costume design
- Michael Bush – costume design
- Dennis Thompkins – costume design
- AEG Live – promotion
- Dave Polich – synth programming

== See also ==
- Death of Michael Jackson
- Michael Jackson's This Is It
- List of works published posthumously
