= PythagoraSwitch =

2002 Japanese TV program

- Genre: Educational
- Country of origin: Japan

Production
- Running time: 15 minutes
- Production company: NHK

Original release
- Network: NHK
- Release: April 9, 2002 – present

PythagoraSwitch (ピタゴラスイッチ, Pitagora Suitchi) is a 15-minute Japanese children's puppet animated preschool educational television program that has been aired by NHK since April 9, 2002. It encourages augmenting children's "way of thinking" under the supervision of Masahiko Satō (佐藤雅彦) and Masumi Uchino (内野真澄). A five-minute format called PythagoraSwitch Mini is also available.

During the beginning and ending of each episode, and between each corner (segment), there are Pythagorean Devices (ピタゴラ装置, Pitagora Sōchi). "Pythagorean device" is the equivalent Japanese colloquialism for the American "Rube Goldberg machine" and British "Heath Robinson" contraption. The main focus of the program is a puppet show, but the subject is mainly advanced by small corners. World phenomena, principles, characteristics, and the like are introduced in an entertaining way. At the end of each segment, the show's title is sung as a kind of punchline.

== Segments ==
In the show, segments are called "corners".

=== Today's Topic ===
A puppet show in which Uncle Encyclopedia (百科おじさん, Hyakka Ojisan) explains the structure of the world to young penguins, Pita (ピタ, Pita) and Gora (ゴラ, Gora). A recurring situation is that, while discussing each topic, Encyclopedia will say "The details are here on my Nth page." (詳しくはわしの○○ページに書いてあーる！, Kuwashiku wa washi no marumaru peiji ni kaite aru!), to what the penguins, after looking at said page, respond "We're children, so we can't read!" (こどもだから、読めませ～ん！, Kodomo dakara, yomemasen!) After that, the three call upon Televi-John (テレビのジョン, Terebi no Jon) an anthropomorphic dog-like TV, who shows them a video about the topic. A mouse called Suu (スー, Suu) is also featured.

=== Underground Gora Switch ===
A puppet show similar to Today's Topic in which a little mole, who lives underground in Pita and Gora's basement, named Gurao (グラオ, Gurao) observes the way world works through a periscope. A common occurrence is that Gurao's periscope will run out before he can see how whatever he's looking at works and when this happens, Gurao calls for his father Chikada Mogurou (地下田モグ郎, Chikada Mogurou), asking to learn more. The two then call for Tabletton (タブレットン, Taburetton), an anthropomorphic pig-like tablet who shows them a video about the topic. Suu from Today's Topic sometimes appears interacting with Gurao and Chikada Mogurou. This segment appears infrequently.

=== Pythagora Devices ===
Pythagora Devices (ピタゴラ装置, Pitagora Souchi) are frequently featured.

=== Algorithm Exercise ===
Algorithm Exercise (アルゴリズムたいそう, Arugorizumu Taisou) A corner broadcast since 2002. It stars the duo Itsumo Kokokara (いつもここから, Itsumo Kokokara). It is algorithm themed, so that the movements that are done side by side are related ("crouching motion" combines with "shaking arms", so that the arms avoid the action, etc.). Usually, the duo does the exercise with special guests, such as NHK announcers, baseball players, sumo wrestlers, etc.

There are also individual versions for each member: the "Yamada version" and the "Kikuchi version".

=== Father Switch ===
Father Switch (おとうさんスイッチ, Otousan Suicchi) A segment in which a father and his child act out sequences and play games based on any of the Japanese letter sounds.

=== Other Corners ===
- Bend the Stick Anime (ポキポキアニメ, Pokipoki Anime)：A segment in which a straight line bends into different shapes, forming different things.
  1. Sumo wrestler
  2. Tea kettle
  3. Chicks
  4. Hammer Thrower
  5. Pteranodon
- The Black Box Person Question (ブラックボックス人問題, Burakku Bokkusu Jin Mondai): A segment in which a black box asks the viewer a question about objects inside it.
- Botejin (ぼてじん, Botejin): A potato shaped like a dice (voiced by Iwao Nozomi) moves forward and backward and to the left and right in the tiles drawn on the ground, with words written on each side of him. He can move even if he is out of the tiles.
- The Circles and Triangles (○と△のしゅうだん, Maru to Sankaku no Shūdan) : A segment where different things appear with circles and triangles above them. The triangle groups usually disappear.
  1. Pigeons that flew away.
  2. Sushi taken by customers.
  3. People with hand warmers in their pockets.
  4. Ice hockey players.
- Do Your Best!! Product Test (がんばれ！製品テスト, Ganbare! Seihin Tesuto): This segment introduces the stages of product testing before the shipment of industrial products.
  1. Office chairs
  2. Ballpoint pens
- Framy (フレーミー, Furēmī): Animated shorts about a dog named Framy, who is made out of clear squares. Other characters that are composed of simple figures, but they are not transparent. Sometimes; Framy's brothers, Painty (ペインティ, Peinti) and Spotty (スポッティー, Supotti), appear in their own stories or interacting with Framy.
- How the Trick Works! By Ms. Hammer Critic! aka Ms. Hammer Critic's Time (トンカッチのそこのしくみがしりタイム, Tonkacchi no Soko no Shikumi ga Shiri Taimu): a critique of Pythagorean Devices by Ms. Hammer Critic (voiced by Mio Ueta), in some segments a dissection of the Pythagora Devices are demonstrated to show “how the trick works”.
  1. Equipment No. 147: 3 Cups
  2. Equipment No. 175: The Come Back Car
  3. Equipment No. 144: The Toothpick
  4. Equipment No. 107: Egg 2
- If You Don't Believe it, Just Try it! (「ウソだと思うなら、やってみな。」, Uso Dato Omounara, Yattemina.): A segment in which the viewer is taught a different experiment.
  1. The Tale of the Egg and Salt (タマゴとしおのはなし, Tamago to Shio no Hanashi): an egg floats on a cup filled with water mixed with salt
  2. Matsugoro the Pinecone (まつぼっくりのマツゴロー, Matsubokkuri no Matsugorō): a pine cone dipped in a glass of water contracts, and when dry it expands back to normal.
  3. Nori seaweed on the diving board (とびこみだいのあじつけのり, Tobikomidai no Ajitsuke Nori): a nori seaweed in a clear package becomes transparent when dipped in a glass of water.
  4. Ice cube in a construction site (こおりのおしろのけんせつちゅう, Kōri no Oshiro no Kensetsuchū): lifting a salted ice cube with a string.
  5. The cup kid's naming practice (コップのこどもなまえをれんしゅう, Koppu no Kodomo Namae o Renshū): pouring water to a cup in front of a paper inscribed コップ (with the pu mirrored horizontally) reverses that letter's image.
  6. "Mini" segment: whiteboard art on a mirror floats when dipped on a tub of water.
  7. "Mini" segment: A boiled egg can spin around.
  8. "Mini" segment: See the inside of an aluminum bag with your smartphone's flashlight when you turn off the lights.
- The Invisible Man X (とうめい人間X, Tōmei Ningen Ekkusu): A segment where a man can turn himself invisible and challenges the viewer to try to follow him around. The segment ends, usually, with a dog barking and the Invisible Man declaring that he "can't stand dogs!".
  1. He challenges the viewers to find him on top of a building.
  2. He challenges the viewers to find him in the ground where he fell after rescuing a cat.
- It Can't Be Done (こんなことできません, Konna Koto Dekimasen): Tsutomu Sekine and Jonio Iwai perform what seems to be physically impossible feats using stop-motion photography. At the end of each segment, the title of the corner changes to "It ~~Can't~~ Can Be Done" (こんなことできま~~せん~~した, Konna Koto Dekima~~sen~~shita).
- Nendore Nandore Mr. Clay, What's Stuck on You Today? (ねんどれナンドレラッツの跡じまん, Nendore Nandorerattsu no Atojiman): A claymation featuring clay characters named Nendore and Nandore tripping on various objects resulting in impressions:
  1. TV remote and peanuts
  2. Colored pencils and a piece of cheese
  3. Cellophane tape dispenser and magnet
  4. Bottle opener and clothespin
  5. Acorns and dice
  6. Mosquito coil and seashells
  7. Marbles and shogi pieces
- A New Creature (新しい生物, Atarashii Seibutsu): A stop-motion animation segment featuring ordinary objects being brought to life.
  1. Erasersaurus (ケシゴムザウルス, Keshigomuzaurusu), eraser
  2. Strawceraps (ストロケラプス, Sutorokerapusu), drinking straw
  3. Rubbernnus (ワゴムヌス, Wagomunus), rubber band
  4. Boltnodon (ボルトノドン, Borutonodon), bolt
  5. Sugarcubeton (カクザザトン, Kakuzazaton), sugar cube
  6. Stickynus (フセンヌス, Fusennusu), sticky note
  7. Chopsticknodon (ハシノドン, Hashinodon), chopsticks
  8. Brushnodon (ブラシノドン, Burashinodon), shoe brush
  9. Matchboxnus (マッチバコヌス, Matchibakonus), matchbox
  10. Aluminumfoilps (アルミホイルプス, Arumihoirupusu), aluminum foil
  Also includes Afterwards (そのあと, Sono Ato) and Evolution (進化, Shinka) segments for some of the above creatures.
- Pythagora Equipment Academy (ピタゴラ装置アカデミア, Pitagora Sōchi Akademia): This segment teaches how to make gadgets and gimmicks included in Pythagora Devices.
  - Beginner Course
    1. Zigzag Sloping Road
    2. Time Lag Device
    3. Flip-flop Top
  - Intermediate Course
    1. A Winding Road
    2. Marble Accelerator
  - Advanced Course
    1. A catapult.
- PythagoraSwitch Folding Handkerchief Theater (ピタゴラスイッチおりたたみハンカチ劇場, Pitagora Suitchi Oritatami Hankachi Gekijō): A segment featuring handkerchiefs with the characters, Pita and Gora, on them. These handkerchiefs tell a story about the characters.
  1. Let's All Play Hide and Seek (みんなでかくれんぼのまき, Minna de Kakurenbo no Maki)
  2. Pita and Gora Play Shiritori (ピタとゴラしりとりあそびのまき, Pita to Gora Shiritori Asobi no Maki)
  3. Let's All Climb The Mountain (みんなで山のぼりのまき, Minna de Yamanobori no Maki)
  4. Pita and Gora Fight (ピタとゴラけんかのまき, Pita to Gora Kenka no Maki)
- See the Wiggle Men! What's Different? (くねくね人まちがいさがし, Kunekune Jin Machigaisagashi): A segment in which the viewer has to spot three differences in two pictures.
- Tape Measure Jackie (まきじゃくのジャック, Makijaku no Jakku): An animated segment about a tape measure named Jackie, who helps his friends or plays with the viewer.
  1. Measuring the TV Screen Episode
  2. Let's Go Mr. Remote Episode
  3. Is Anyone Nine Centimeters Tall? Episode
  4. Measuring the Vacuum Cord Episode
  5. Measuring the Kitchen Scale Episode
  6. The Lookalike Episode
  7. The Wind Around Tape Episode
- 10-Stick Anime (10本アニメ, 10-Pon Anime): Ten small sticks join and transform into various things.
- Then the Bridge Thought of What to Do (そこで橋は考えた, Soko de Hashi wa Kangaeta): A segment that introduces different, interesting bridges.
  1. Swing bridge (Amanohashidate, Kyoto)
  2. Bascule bridge (Tei Port Moveable Bridge in Kōnan, Kōchi)
  3. Lift bridge (Kagasunobashi in Tokushima)
  4. Transporter bridge (Vizcaya Bridge in Biscay, Spain)
  5. Submersible bridge (on Corinth Canal in Isthmia, Greece)
  6. Rolling bascule bridge (Te Matau ā Pohe in Whangārei, New Zealand)
- Today's Counting Numbers (かぞえてみよう, Kazoetemiyou): A segment in which the viewer is invited to count different objects.
- Today's Switch (今日のスイッチ, Kyō no Suitchi): In a certain place, a start switch is pressed in a machine, which introduces something happening.
  1. A Ferris wheel being lit up at night.
  2. A roller coaster.
  3. The spotlights onstage of an opera house.
- Today's Just Barely (きょうのスレスレ, Kyō no Suresure): A segment in which an object is pushed through a shape it can just barley pass through on a conveyor belt, there's also a "turning version".
- Today's Robot (きょうのロボット, Kyō no Robotto): A segment which introduces various robots (mainly work robots).
  1. Sentry robot
  2. Bicycle parking
  3. Automatic milking
  4. A robot that goes into rocky gaps to save people's lives.
  5. A robot that moves red hot metals.
  6. A robot that puts books onto a book shelf.
- Understand in 5 Seconds (5秒でわかる, 5-Byō de Wakaru): A segment in which different concepts are introduced in 5 seconds.
- What Animal is This? (なんのどうぶつ?, Nan no Dōbutsu?): Motion capture animation, in which dots appear one by one, inviting readers to guess what animal is depicted in the initial film.
  1. An inchworm
  2. A monkey
  3. A crab
  4. A pigeon
- What Numbers are They? (何の数字?, Nan no Sūji?): A segment in which the viewer has to guess what kind of object something is based on its numbers.
  1. The dates on a calendar
  2. The numbers on a grocery store salespaper
- What on Earth is This? (なんだこれ?, Nanda Kore?): Different shapes appear on a turntable and turn into different objects.
  1. A horse
  2. Fish bones
  3. Walking the dog
  4. A Squid
- What are These Points?/What's this Person's Doing? (なにしてる点? / なにしてるひと?, Nani Shiteru Ten?/Nani Shiteru Hito?): An inlay of dots, as in What Animal is This?, together with motion capture, invites viewers to guess what these dots form or person is doing.
  1. Bullfighting
  2. Conducting
  3. Rhythmic Gymnastics
  4. Air hockey
  5. A ladybug walking on a leaf
  6. Eggs being sorted
- Which One is Real? (どっちが本物？, Docchi ga Honmono?): A segment in which the viewer has to guess which object is real and which one is not.
  1. Tangerines
  2. Pencils
  3. Teacups
- Pythagora Rock-Paper-Scissors Device (ピタゴラじゃんけん装置, Pitagora Janken Sōchi): The viewer is invited to play rock paper scissors with a Pythagora device.
- Helper Robo (おてつだいロボ, Otetsudai Robo): A segment featuring a game where a kid does chores based around the Japanese letters, similar to Father Switch (おとうさんスイッチ (Otousan Suicchi)).
- 100 Gram Challenge! (100グラムにちょうせん！, Hyakku Guramu ni Chousen!): A segment in which a kid plays a game, putting toys or household items on a character named Mr. Scale (はかり先生, Hakari Sensei). 100 grams is achieved by getting up to 95-99 grams then offered 1 or more yen coins from the Helpful Box (おたすけボックス, Otasuke Bokksu) and placing the coins on the scale.
- Letter Device (もじもじ装置, Moji Moji Sōchi): A segment in which the Japanese letters form a word using an animated Pythagora device.
- Letter Conveyor (もじもじコンベヤー, Moji Moji Conbeya): Japanese letters form a word on a conveyor belt.
- Mekanuka (めかぬか, Mekanuka): A segment featuring song in which the viewer has to guess which similar Japanese symbol is forming. There's also versions called はかけか (Hakakeka),るかろか (Rukaroka) and ねかわか (Nekawaka).
- Pythagora Code Stick (ピタゴラ暗号棒, Pitagora Angoubou): A segment in which a kid writes a "secret message" that can only be read by wrapping the paper around a cylinder shaped stick to their father, requesting to do an activity with him.
- Tatehiko and Yokohiko (タテひことヨコひこ, Tatehiko to Yokohiko): Two friends named Tatehiko and Yokohiko draw pictures together. Yokohiko can only move left and right while Tatehiko can help him move up and down.
- Now, What is Passing? (いま、なにがとおった, Ima, Nani ga tootta): A segment in which an image passes by a gap and the viewer has to guess what it is.
  1. A soccer ball.
  2. A pinecone.
  3. A wooden carved bear.
  4. A watering can.
- Who's This? (だれじん？, Darejin?): A segment in which Botejin appears, meeting other similar creatures.
  1. Tissue Box Person (ティッシュボックスじん, Tisshu bokkusu Jin)
  2. Battery Person (かんでんちじん, Kandenchi Jin)
  3. Cardboard Box Person and Duct Tape Person (ダンボールバコじんとガムテープじん, Danbōrubako Jin to Gamu Tēpu Jin)
- Inuten Program (いぬてんプログラム, Inuten Puroguramu): A segment similar to a computer game. It has a cube like dog named Inuten, directions such as "left", "right", "up" and "down" are called to help him reach a certain goal.
- Animal Program (どうぶつのプログラム, Dobutsu no Puroguramu): A segment in which an animal reaches a certain goal.
  1. A ladybug walks across Japanese words to form sentences.
  2. A lizard goes into his cage by following the sunlight.
- Animal Algorithm (どうぶつのアルゴリズム, Dobutsu no Arugorizumu): A segment similar to Animal Program in which an animal reaches a certain goal.
  1. A ladybug goes up and down a ramp.
  2. A bug goes through a maze.
- What is this Imprint? (なんの跡？, Nan no Ato?): The viewer is asked to guess a certain kind of imprint.
  1. A track runner.
- Paper Cup Cup Code (紙コップコップ暗号, Kami Koppu Koppu Angou): Similar to "Pythagora Code Stick", a child writes a secret message to their father using paper cups.
- Pythagora 1 Minute Crafts (ピタゴラ１ぷん工作, Pitagora 1-Pun Kousaku): A segment introducing "one minute crafts" that the viewer can try at home.
  1. Today's Snack Device
  2. CD Case Person
- Pythagora Equipment Try and Error (ピタゴラ装置トライ＆エラー, Pitagora Sōchi Torai & Eraa): Ms. Hammer Critic explains how to fix errors in Pythagora Equipment.
- What are you doing, Mister? (なにしてるの、おじさん？, Nanishiteruno, Ojisan?): A boy and his friends observe a man miming different actions. The boy asks the man what he is doing and the viewer sees a video of it.
  1. Brushing a tortoise's shell.
- Sugar Cube Anime (カクザトアニメ, Kakuzato Anime): A stop motion animation where 10 sugar cubes arrange into different shapes, similar to "10 Stick Anime".
- Deji Deji Tile Person (でじでじタイルじん, Deji Deji Tairu Jin): An animation in which a digital person shaped like tiles can move around on tiled surfaces.

== Actors ==
Dankichi Kuruma (車だん吉), Jun Inoue (井上順), and Tsuyoshi Kusanagi (草彅剛), are some of the voice actors who perform and call out the topics. Akira Tokuda (徳田章) provides narration and voices a character named Tokuda Nezumi (徳田ネズミ), a mouse who sometimes introduces the show or introduces segments.

== Broadcast ==
Outside Japan, NHK World Premium broadcasts PythagoraSwitch Mini. In Brazil, TV Cultura has been broadcasting it under the title Viva Pitágoras! since at least 2006. Starting April 2015, an English version of PythagoraSwitch Mini has been broadcast on NHK World TV. In addition, some PythagoraSwitch videos are also available on Google Video, YouTube and DailyMotion.

== Awards ==
At the 30th Japan Prize International Educational Program Contest, in 2003, episode 25 "Let's Look at It Another Way" won top prize, the Prime Minister's award, of the Early Education category. At Prix Jeunesse 2004 in Munich it won top prize in the age 6 and below non-fiction category.
