= Michael Jackson's This Is It =

2009 film by Kenny Ortega

- Theatrical release poster
- Directed by: Kenny Ortega
- Produced by: Randy Phillips; Kenny Ortega; Paul Gongaware
- Starring: Michael Jackson
- Cinematography: Tim Patterson (Note: Credited as "cameramen".); Sandrine Orabona
- Edited by: Don Brochu; Brandon Key; Tim Patterson; Kevin Stitt
- Music by: Michael Bearden
- Production companies: Columbia Pictures; The Michael Jackson Company; AEG Live
- Distributed by: Sony Pictures Releasing
- Release date: October 28, 2009
- Running time: 111 minutes
- Country: United States
- Language: English
- Budget: $60 million
- Box office: $268 million

Michael Jackson's This Is It is a 2009 American musical documentary film about Michael Jackson's preparation for This Is It, a planned concert residency that was canceled due to his death in 2009. Released four months after Jackson's death, the film features behind-the-scenes footage of rehearsals and related preparations for the concerts. The film was directed by Kenny Ortega, the show director of the canceled concerts, who confirmed that none of the footage was originally intended for release; however, after Jackson's death, an agreement was made between This Is It concert promoter AEG Live and the Michael Jackson Estate to produce the film. The footage was filmed in Los Angeles, primarily at the Staples Center and The Forum.

The film was given a worldwide release and a limited two-week theatrical run from October 28 to November 12, 2009, but the theatrical release was later extended for an additional three weeks in domestic theaters and one to three weeks in overseas markets. Tickets went on sale a month early on September 27 to satisfy a high anticipated demand; the film broke numerous pre-sale and box office records.

The release of the film attracted controversy, much of which centered on claims that it exploited Jackson's death, and that AEG Live released the film primarily to recoup losses from the canceled concerts. Multiple members of the Jackson family spoke out against the film, with some attempting to prevent its release. The film was also the subject of allegations that body doubles had been used in place of Jackson, claims that Sony denied. Additionally, it faced backlash from some of Jackson's fans, some of whom organized protests against the film. In August 2009, a judge approved a deal among Michael Jackson Estate executors John Branca and John McClain, AEG Live, and Sony Pictures, allowing Sony to edit hundreds of hours of rehearsal footage to create the film; Sony subsequently paid $60 million for the film rights.

The film received generally positive reviews from critics; the portrayal of Jackson and his performances were generally praised. Despite the controversy, the ticket sales for This Is It broke international records a month before its release. It made $267.9 million worldwide, and it is listed in the Guinness World Records as the highest-grossing documentary film at the global box office. By the end of 2010, the DVD sales for This Is It stood at 2.8 million units, with gross earnings of $45 million in the US alone. In Japan, This Is It earned $18 million in sales on the title's first day of release with 358,000 combined DVD sales.

== Summary ==
The film begins with a short text introduction stating the purpose of the footage and its intent "For the fans...". After short dialogues from various dancers, Kenny Ortega is heard talking through the original concert opening sequence involving a bodysuit made from screens that display fast clips and images with bright intensity from which Jackson emerges on stage. Immediately after this, Jackson begins "Wanna Be Startin' Somethin'" first solo, which pauses halfway through and a small snippet of Jackson singing his song "Speechless" Acappella is shown. Jackson is then joined by dancers and completes the first number. A short clip showing rehearsals of the "toaster" mechanism is shown before rehearsal footage of "Jam" is played. This plays directly into the green screen adaptation of soldiers dancers for "Bad" which are also used for "They Don't Care About Us" which is shown next. From here, the film shows Michael directing Ortega and his band for his solo rehearsal performance of "Human Nature" which he performs Acappella, then with keyboard, and finally with a full band. Green screen rehearsals for the video vignette for "Smooth Criminal" come next (with scenes from his film Moonwalker as well as the film Gilda featuring Rita Hayworth singing "Put the Blame on Mame"). Jackson is seen next directing his musical team for the cues in his song "The Way You Make Me Feel". Jackson then performs a rehearsal with dancers which he alters and changes as he goes. Jackson then rehearses a medley of The Jackson 5 songs: "I Want You Back", "The Love You Save", "I'll Be There" and "Shake Your Body (Down to the Ground)". After this, Jackson sings with Judith Hill, one of his backup singers, on his duet song "I Just Can't Stop Loving You". The filming for the "Thriller" vignette is then shown with Jackson and Ortega watching with 3D glasses. Jackson is then seen rehearsing "Thriller" with the vignette intertwined like that in "Smooth Criminal". Footage of the show's aerialists rehearsing to the instrumental of "Who Is It" is shown next.

During the dance sequence, puppets are suspended in the audience aisles while Jackson emerges from a robotic spider originally seen in the vignette. Jackson and Ortega rehearsing the cherry picker is seen next, along with Jackson rehearsing "Beat It". Footage of Jackson and the band rehearsing "Black or White" is shown next, with guitarist Orianthi Panagaris finishing with a high guitar riff. The video sequence for "Earth Song" is shown next, featuring a little girl who wanders through a forest, falls asleep, and wakes up to find the forest destroyed by man. He then performs a quick version of his song "Billie Jean". Michael is then seen talking to all crew members and wishing everyone the best for the London performances. At a soundcheck, Michael performs "Man in the Mirror" with strong backing vocals. The credits are shown next, with a montage of rehearsal clips and "This Is It" being played in the background. After the show, a live recording of "Heal the World" was played. Then, the audio of "Human Nature" was played, with a clip of Michael rehearsing it in early June (the 3D screen was not set up yet). Then, a clip of what could have been a Dome Project video of "Heal the World" was shown, in which the girl that appeared in the "Earth Song" video was shown holding the world and a signed message, by Michael, saying "I Love You".

== Background ==
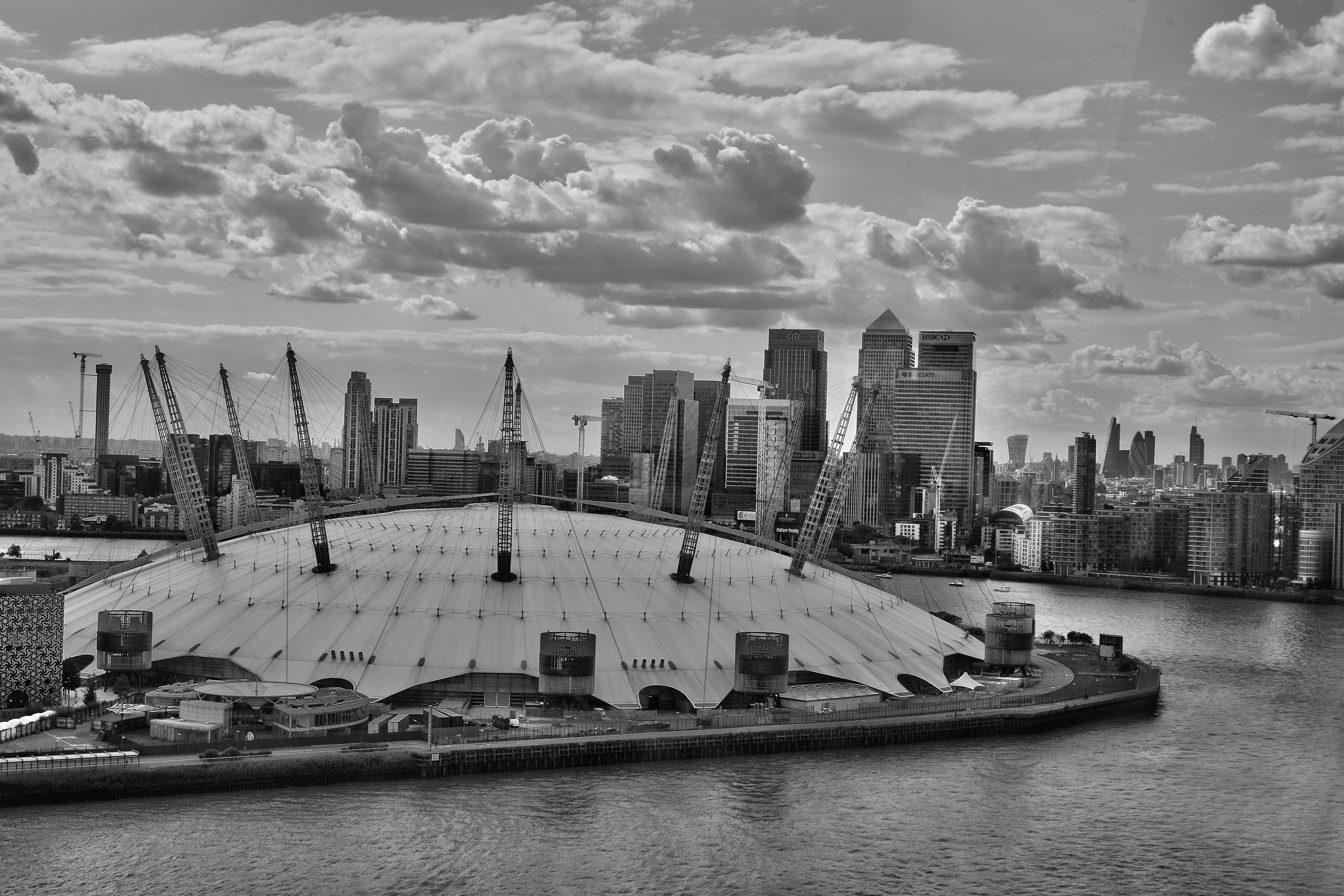
The O2 Arena, where the concerts were set to have been held. Jackson was to perform from July 2009 to March 2010—which would have been the longest residency at the arena.

On March 5, 2009, at the O2 Arena, Jackson announced that he was to perform 10 concerts as part of a comeback. On March 11, two days before pre-sale began, an extra 40 dates were added to meet high demand, bringing the number of shows to 50 — five of these dates were reserved in their entirety for the public sale. Jackson's 50 dates would have made the concerts the longest residency at the arena. In May 2009, the tour was originally set to have begun on July 8, 2009, and finished on February 24, 2010.

On May 20, 2009, it was announced that the first concert would be pushed back by five days to July 13, and three other July dates would be rescheduled for March 2010. AEG Live stated that the delay was necessary because more time was needed to prepare, mainly for dress rehearsals. The revised schedule called for 27 shows between July 13 and September 29, 2009, followed by a three-month break, and resuming in 2010, with 23 more shows between January 7 and March 6, 2010. The This Is It concert tour would have been Jackson's first major performances and series of concerts since the HIStory World Tour that began in 1996 and finished in 1997. In preparation for the concerts, Jackson had been collaborating with multiple well known and high-profile figures, such as Kenny Ortega, who would have served as his choreographer. On June 29, 2009, only days after Jackson's death, AEG Live, the concert's promoter, offered ticket holders two choices—to either be refunded the money for their tickets or to keep the tickets as a souvenir and memento by receiving the printed ticket that Jackson had designed himself.

== Music ==
The album, This Is It, was released on October 26 and debuted at number one on the Billboard 200 album chart with the sales of over 373,000 in its first week of release. The two-disc album features music 'that inspired the movie'. Sony said of the albums that: "Disc one will feature the original album masters of some of Michael's biggest hits arranged in the same sequence as they appear in the film" and stated that "the disc ends with two versions of the 'never-released' "This Is It". This song is featured in the film's closing sequence and includes backing vocals by Michael Jackson's brothers, The Jacksons." Sony also stated that the second disc will feature "previously unreleased versions" from Jackson's 'catalogue of hits' and that It will also include a spoken word poem entitled "Planet Earth" (which originally appeared in the liner notes of the Dangerous album) and a 36-page commemorative booklet with "photos of Michael [Jackson] from his last rehearsal".

=== Set list ===
1. "Glimpses and Flashes" (introduction)
2. "Wanna Be Startin' Somethin'" (contains a cappella snippet of "Speechless")
3. "Jam" (contains excerpts of "Another Part of Me")
4. "The Drill" (contains excerpts of "Bad", "Dangerous" and "Mind Is the Magic")
5. "They Don't Care About Us" (contains elements of "HIStory", "She Drives Me Wild" and "Why You Wanna Trip on Me")
6. "Human Nature"
7. "Smooth Criminal"
8. "The Way You Make Me Feel"
9. "Shake Your Body (Down to the Ground)" (Band Interlude)
10. ´´Jackson 5 Medley
11. "I Just Can't Stop Loving You" (duet with Judith Hill)
12. "Thriller" (contains excerpts of "Ghosts" and "Threatened")
13. "Beat It"
14. "Black or White"
15. "Earth Song"
16. "Billie Jean"
17. "Man in the Mirror"
18. "This Is It" (closing sequence)

== Production ==
The film's director and choreographer, Ortega, stated that the rehearsal footage and concept of making a film to document the preparation of the concerts had come about as "an accident". Ortega stated the film was pieced together from "private footage" shot by documentarians Sandrine Orabona and Tim Patterson of Jackson and the concerts crew rehearsing and that before Jackson's death, was never intended to be released. "The recordings were made so we could use them, then the tapes were destined for Michael [Jackson]'s private library. They have a real unguarded honesty to them." Ortega stated that he had gotten the idea to use the rehearsal footage from Jackson's fans after his death: "At first I got so many messages from fans around the world asking to see the shows, asking to see the footage and eventually I realized the journey wasn't over and we had to do this", and Ortega also stated that the film was made only for the Jackson fans: "[The film] is for the fans and the film will show the development and intentions of the show, and the concert as it moved closer to London."

On August 10, a Superior Court Judge officially approved the deal between Columbia Pictures (film distributor) and AEG Live (the concerts promoter) for Columbia to be able to purchase and distribute rehearsal footage of Jackson and the rehearsal crew for the film. The deal also included a merchandising agreement with Bravado International Group—the company is a division of Universal Music Group that is owned by Vivendi—so that they can distribute and sell "Jackson-themed products". Columbia had reportedly paid $60 million (£35 million) for rights to the rehearsal footage in court documents that were filed. The papers filed had also reportedly stated that Jackson's estate will get 90% of the profits and that AEG will get the remaining 10% from the film's revenue. In the agreement, Columbia and AEG Live both agreed in the deal that the final version of the film should be no longer than 150 minutes (2 hours and 30 minutes), and that the film must attain a PG rating. The contract also stated that the film is not allowed to show footage of Jackson that shows him in a negative way, stating that: "Footage that paints Jackson in a bad light will not be permitted" and "Under the terms of the proposed contract, the film will have to be screened for Jackson's estate and cannot include any footage that puts the superstar in a bad light." The court papers stated that in order for the film to be released to the public the final version of the film must be screened to John Branca, John McClain, and their representatives.

== Release ==
=== Marketing ===
On September 9, 2009, the film's official theatrical movie poster was released. On September 10, 2009, it was reported that MTV's Video Music Awards, which at the time had already announced that they would honor Jackson at the show, would premiere the film's first, and only, trailer. Along with Janet Jackson's tribute to Michael, the trailer of the film premiered at the 2009 MTV Video Music Awards. On September 12, 2009, it was reported that a "secret Michael Jackson [promotional music] single is being produced" to promote the film, at which the film would have, at the time, been released the following month. It was reported that Jackson had recorded the song for release with his planned summer tour but after his death, it was shelved until producers in Los Angeles remixed the vocals with an orchestral accompaniment.

On September 23, 2009, it was reported that the film's new song "This Is It" would be released on October 12, 2009, sixteen days before the film's release. On October 9, it was confirmed that the song would debut online the following Monday at midnight, receiving its world premiere on MichaelJackson.com. On September 21, 2009, Sony released a 45-second clip of Jackson rehearsing his performance for "Human Nature" and also released stills from the video clip. As part of a print marketing campaign for the film, Entertainment Weekly magazine did a cover story of the film for the magazine's October 16, 2009 issue, to collide with the film's release for that same month. Also as part of promotion for the film, Entertainment Weekly released 8 "never before seen" movie stills from the film. On October 21, a clip of Jackson rehearsing "The Way You Make Me Feel" was released. On October 21, a 2-minute featurette of the film was released.

In September 2009, Sony launched "This-Is-It-Fans.com", which allowed fans to sign up for an 'alert' so that they can be able to take part in 'Michael Jackson's This Is It mosaic', in which fans could upload photos to the website, beginning September 21 and running to September 30, and the completed mosaic would be posted online on October 22, six days before the film's release. On September 24, 2009, MTV announced, after the success, the project proved with New Moon, that they will allow MTV registered users, to "watch and comment on any scene in the film's already released trailer". MTV described the project as "essentially [being] an in-video graphical overlay that allows users to comment on the video as it plays and review comments from other users.

=== Ticket sales ===
On September 25, 2009, lines opened at the courtyard outside the Nokia Theatre in downtown Los Angeles. It is estimated that hundreds of people were in line; venue owners permitted them to bring chairs and umbrellas during the wait. Lenticular commemorative tickets were made available to the first 500 people in line, as well as those who traded in tickets purchased for the original tour. Jeff Labrecque of En commented, "Three months after Michael Jackson's death, I'm still surprised by the passion of his fans." Bridget Daly of Hollyscoop commented on the waiting time for tickets that, she could "expect nothing less" from Jackson's fans.

On September 27, 2009, the first day of ticket sales, all 3,000 tickets to the advance screenings of the film had "sold out within two hours." CinemaBlend reported that over 160 showings had sold out. Reuters.com, stated that "hundreds of screenings in North America have already sold out, a month before the film's October 28 opening." According to MovieTickets.com, sales of tickets to the film have "accounted for more than 82 percent of all the tickets sold at the site today [Monday, September 28, 2009]." CinemaBlend.com described the sale of tickets on MovieTickets.com as being "fairly significant"—but remarked that "this is after all, just a concert documentary." It was reported that over 80 percent of tickets sold on Fandango.com were for this film. It was also reported that the film had "accounted for some 80% of all online ticketing in the US within its first 24 hours of sales, dominating presales compared with such upcoming titles as Avatar and The Twilight Saga: New Moon. Sony, confirmed that over 30,000 tickets were sold in the first 24 hours that tickets went on sale. Sony also stated that the film had moved over 1 million dollars in tickets sales in Japan. Sony announced in a press release that in the "last 24 hours [since September 27]", over 80% of all Fandango.com and Movietickets.com sales for the film, had already sold out in Los Angeles, San Francisco, Houston, Nashville and New York, among others and: "Internationally, exhibitors from London and Sydney to Bangkok and Tokyo have experienced the same epic demand." Sony stated in a statement of the film's good ticket sale's that: "Staggering advance sales were reported in Australia, where tickets for Michael Jackson's This Is It purchased through Village Cinemas exceeded the lifetime pre-sales of such blockbusters as Transformers and X-Men Origins: Wolverine.

On October 1, 2009, Fandango.com stated the film was the 'top ticket seller' on the site. Both Fandango.com and Movietickets.com are reported that more than 1,600 screenings had already been sold out, via online pre-sales, by October 15. In the United Kingdom, Vue Entertainment stated that they'd sold 64,000 tickets in the two-and-a-half weeks since ticket purchasing was made available, while Odeon Cinema stated that they'd had the sales of over 60,000 tickets by October 15. E! Online said of the film, based on its current record ticket selling, out-selling and making more revenue then Hannah Montana & Miley Cyrus: Best of Both Worlds Concert that: "Last year, Disney billed Miley Cyrus' Best of Both Worlds show as a one-week-only event. Then the film scored a $31 million opening weekend, and one week turned into 15. Hannah Montana/Miley Cyrus became the top-grossing concert movie of all time. So far. While it's still early, This Is It is on track to top Hannah Montana/Miley Cyrus. During its first three days of sales, Fandango said, Jackson's film outpaced Cyrus' first three days by a wide three-to-one margin." Joel Cohen, the executive vice president of MovieTickets.com, said of the ticket sales: "Michael Jackson is such an iconic figure, with a fan base that transcends even some of the most bankable stars in Hollywood [...] We expected there to be a large demand for tickets for an 'event' film like this one, but MovieTickets.com has never seen such a high volume of sellouts this far in advance for any movie."

==== Record sales ====
Stuart Boreman, Vue Entertainment's film buying director, stated that the film's sales of over 300,000 tickets in the period of 1 day (24 hours) had "broken box office records" of having the "biggest ever one-day sales record" in the United Kingdom. Boreman stated: "I've never seen anything like it in the 25 years I have been film buying" and described the film's ticket sales as "a true phenomenon and sales show no sign of slowing down." It was reported that fans had lined up at the box office ticket counters throughout the city of Bangkok, Thailand and that by the end of the first day "all tickets for the first showings across Bangkok were sold out." It was also reported that there were "sell-outs at theaters in France" and that "thousands of fans lined up at The Grand Rex in Paris and quickly bought out the film's first screening there [...] Record-setting sales also were recorded in Germany [...] hundreds of fans lined up outside one theater in Munich at midnight to await the opening of the box office." A German exhibitor said of crowds of people lining up for tickets to the film, that: "Something like this [has] never happened before in Germany." Among other countries, "record sales" and "sell-outs" were also reported in The Netherlands, Sweden, Belgium and New Zealand. On October 7, 2009, three weeks prior to the film's release, MovieTickets.com stated that the film had entered their "Top-25 Advance Ticket Sellers of All-Time", bumping The Lord of the Rings: The Fellowship of the Ring from the Number 25 slot. By October 27, Kinekor cinemas sold over 24,000 pre-sale tickets in South Africa, tripling the previous pre-sale record.

=== IMAX and release ===
Despite the fact that IMAX screenings are usually planned and booked months in advance by the film's movie distributors, Regal Entertainment Group, America's largest cinema chain, stated on September 30, that they would screen IMAX versions of the film at their cinemas. Regal stated that they are planning on making 25 of their IMAX locations available for the screening of the film when it opened to the public on October 28. Dick Westerling, head of marketing and advertising for Regal, stated that the film was selected due to its strong ticket sales. IMAX Corporation and Sony stated that the film will open in digital IMAX theaters and that the limited IMAX release will be played domestically during "evening show times" in 96 IMAX digital theaters, and additionally the movie will be played in 27 of the company's international digital locations. A key part of the IMAX DMR process includes re-mastering the soundtrack to take advantage of IMAX's 14,000 watt digital audio system.

On August 11, it was widely announced, and later confirmed, that the film would be released to theaters in October 2009, though at the time no specific date was released or confirmed. When confirmed it was reported that the film was set be released worldwide on October 30, 2009. Later in August it was announced that the film's release date was rescheduled two days early for October 28. Sony stated that the film's release date was moved up by two days due to an 'overwhelming demand' for the film." On October 6, it was reported and confirmed by a Sony executive, that the film had been chosen to be one of the last of China's "20 annual foreign movie import slots". China only allows 20 major foreign films to be released in the country every year on a revenue-sharing basis. Chinese censors had reportedly approved the film before the countries weeklong holiday that started on October 1, clearing it in time for the global release date of October 28. Li Chow, manager of Sony Pictures Releasing International's stated that Sony will give the movie as wide a release as possible because of Jackson's popularity in China.

== Controversies ==
In September 2009, AEG stated, based on the positive enthusiasm by fans for waiting in lines for days for tickets to the film, that they had hoped that it was a sign that the public had not felt that they were exploiting Jackson after his death. Tim Leiweke, the president of AEG, stated that he hoped that the film would give fans some peace of mind that as a company, Jackson's "legacy" and well-being was always a priority and the fact that people had thought otherwise had really "hurt" people at AEG. Leiweke said:

Some of the things that people have said about us, which are so untrue, this movie's going to restore his legacy, and prove that we, in fact, gave Michael a second chance here. And an opportunity to make the kind of comeback he was dreaming of. And that we created an environment for him that was probably the best environment that the guy had the last 10 or 15 years of his life. And I'm very proud of the way we treated Michael, and very proud of the partnership that we had with him. And this movie is an opportunity to celebrate that, and we could get past all of the gossip and all of the innuendo.

Multiple members of Jackson's family had opposed the film since August 2009 and Jackson's nephews tried to go to court to stop negotiations between AEG Live and Sony. Jackson's older sister La Toya said she felt that Michael wouldn't have wanted the film to have been released because he wasn't giving his all into his performances. In October 2009, Jackson's father, Joe, strongly insisted that the film "is mostly body doubles" and that "the media is going to tear this movie apart" because of it. TMZ also stated members of the Jackson family had felt that footage of "Jackson" in the film wasn't him but rather body double(s). However, Sony released a statement denying rumors that the film had rehearsal footage of Jackson body doubles, describing the story as "pure garbage".

At the time of Jackson's death, and in its aftermath, multiple reports surfaced that AEG Live purposely tried to hide Jackson's health concerns during preparations for his proposed concerts. Concerns included Jackson's frail appearance due to lack of nutrition that had reportedly caused him to be unable to perform properly, causing AEG to use stand-ins during rehearsals. On October 23, 2009, days before the film's release, fans of Jackson launched a protest campaign against the film entitled "This Is not It". The campaign's focus was to convince people that Jackson's health was neglected by AEG, among others, and that AEG was partly responsible for Jackson's death which they were now profiting from. The group started a website and created their own 'trailer' for the movie to showcase their point-of-view on the documentary. The protestors also inaccurately claimed that Jackson was 108 pounds (49 kg) at his death, contradicting Jackson's autopsy, which had stated that Jackson weighed 136 pounds (61 kg). Shortly after the protest became news, The Guardian conducted a poll on their website asking users "What do you think of Michael Jackson's posthumous film Is This It?", 51.4% agreed with one of the two options: "I agree with the fans who are boycotting it — it's shameless profiteering".

== Reception ==
=== Box office ===
In the United States, This Is It finished first at the box office in its opening weekend with $23.2 million at 3,481 theaters—with a per-theater average of $6,675 over the period of five days. This return was deemed "underperformed" by both Sony and film analysts' expectations—Sony's had originally expected the film to make an estimated $50 million, but after the film's "disappointing" three-day gross, due to some fans, mostly in North America, boycotting the film and issuing boycott propaganda in social networks and media, they lowered their expectations to $35 million, while analysts expected an estimated $30 million for the weekend. In the film's second weekend of wide release, it declined to 43.4%, making $13.2 million, placing it at second at the box office, behind A Christmas Carol. The film completed its theatrical run in North America on December 3, 2009.

This Is It made its international debut in 110 territories on October 28–30, 2009. The film's revenue mainly consisted of international sales (72.4%). Throughout the film's international release, it performed strongly at the box office, despite some criticism from other fans in North America. On November 7, the film surpassed the $100 million mark at the foreign box office, reaching block-buster status. Outside North America, This Is It had its best performance in Japan, where the $55.57 million earnings made it the fourth-highest-grossing movie of the year. At the Australian box office, This Is It grossed $8.7 million and $1.9 million (in Australian currency). This Is It debuted at first place at the United Kingdom box office, with the revenue of £4.9 million. In the film's second weekend of release, with the gross revenue of the previous week being down 52%, with £.4 million, it placed at second at the United Kingdom—having been outgrossed by A Christmas Carol, which, similar to its second week at the North American box office, had been knocked to second place by the film. The film's international revenue was significantly contributed to within Japan—with $57.03 million, followed by the United Kingdom—with $16 million. With $267.9 million worldwide, This Is It became the highest-grossing documentary of all time.

=== Critical response ===
The film received mostly positive reviews from film critics. Review aggregator Rotten Tomatoes reports that 81% of 182 critics have given the film a positive review, with a rating average of 7.13/10. The site's general consensus is that "While it may not be the definitive concert film (or the insightful backstage look) some will hope for, Michael Jackson's This Is It packs more than enough entertainment value to live up to its ambitious title." Metacritic, which assigns a normalized rating out of 100 to reviews from film critics, has a rating score of 67 based on 32 reviews, indicating "generally favorable" reviews.

Roger Ebert of the Chicago Sun Times described the film as being an "extraordinary documentary", and stated that the film was "nothing at all like what" he was expecting to see. Ebert dismissed reports that Jackson was in poor health and was underperforming, stating that the film didn't show a "sick and drugged man forcing himself through grueling rehearsals, but a spirit embodied by music" and referred to Jackson's rehearsal performance(s) as having been "something else". Kirk Honeycutt of The Hollywood Reporter praised the film for being "strange yet strangely beguiling" for capturing Jackson in "feverish grips of pure creativity" and stated that while the film presents that audience with a screen filled with everyone ranging from "performers, musicians, choreographers, crew members, craftsmen", he took notice that the film had primarily focused on Jackson. Honeycutt perceived based on what he'd seen from the behind-the-scenes look of rehearsals that he understood what it takes to "attain such dizzying heights in entertainment" and that he understood why Jackson "chose to stay away" from performing "for a decade" and, based on what he saw from footage from rehearsals that it "looks like the world has missed one helluva concert". Honeycutt cited that the only thing that frustrated him more than knowing the "tragedy" that prevented the concert from happening was "not knowing what you're looking at" and commented that the film did not feel like a complete concert film because it had a grip on the audience, stating: "Where are Jackson and his conspirators at any given moment in the creative process? The film tries to be a concert film without having the actual footage. So when everything comes to a halt, audiences get thrown." Peter Travers, of Rolling Stone described watching Jackson's "struggle" as being "illuminating, unnerving and unforgettable" and felt that the film was a great "transcendent tribute" to Jackson because it didn't have, nor need, a "safety net".

"More important, however, is that we rarely witness Jackson giving 100%: He frequently comments that he is saving his voice and body for the actual performances. Jackson certainly can't be faulted for this, but it's questionable whether he would really want his fans to see him thus. Don't get me wrong: 60% of Michael Jackson is still a pretty good thing [...] [Jackson] the noted perfectionist, at work, correcting others' dance moves without missing a beat himself and giving notes, sometimes revelatory and other times inscrutable, to his music director and others"

— Marjorie Baumgarten of Austin Chronicle

Joshua Rothkopf of Time Out New York referred to being a "must-see danceumentary". Rothkopf described Jackson as "obviously" having been "shooting for the moon right before his death" based on what he could tell from the "stunning bits of concert spectacle" of "phalanxes of computer-generated dancers, tempo changes on a dime, a bombshell of a blond guitarist who plays Eddie Van Halen's "Beat It" solo flawlessly". Rothkopf stated that: "But the true value of this raw rehearsal footage is its emphasis, less known, on MJ's laserlike attention to detail, as he works for his band and troupe up to speed. A firm floor manager himself, he's often exposed—and probably wouldn't have approved of this film. (One on one, High School Musical's Kenny Ortega, meanwhile, treats him with kid gloves: "I agree, Michael.") But to see him sweetly lose himself in "Human Nature" ("I like living this way...") is to feel a creature of the stage finally returned home, and possibly on the cusp of redemption." Peter Paras, of E! Online felt that watching Jackson and his performances in a positive aspect is the "genius and the sadness of the entire film". He did note that Jackson's performance of "Earth Song", which consists of using Jackson's voiceover to emphasize his environmental concerns while a bulldozer threatens to eat him, was well-intentioned—because it brought attention to environmental concerns—but felt it was a little over the top. Paras felt the film showed an "exacting and refreshingly funny side of Jackson to be revealed" and "had Jackson lived, we never would have seen those moments" and felt the film was a proper way to "finally say goodbye" to Jackson.

Marjorie Baumgarten of Austin Chronicle referred to the film as being "neither a true concert film nor a strict behind-the-scenes documentary, This Is It is, like Jackson himself, a real hybrid" and felt that while the film's "made up of lots of grainy footage, which Ortega has edited together seamlessly" it will also "provide a fitting farewell". Baumgarten noted that "the finished film is a fairly complete concert run-through with each song edited" and that while the film will easily show that it was made for a profit, that, the audience will see a "film to be a fitting elegy." Joe Morgenstern, of The Wall Street Journal, felt the film was "expertly packaged—brilliantly packaged", and noted that the film "quite convincingly" had emphasized that Jackson had enough energy to perform, even with his "wraith-thin body". Ann Powers, of Los Angeles Times said that while the film offers only a few such "insights into Jackson's artistic process, though enough surface to make this a useful document, as well as a beautiful one" that the film is "a piece with Jackson's body of work: dazzling and strange, blurring the line between fantasy and reality". She described Ortega's editing to make the film feel like a real concert film as being "almost too good to believe". Powers praised the film for showing "intimate views" of Jackson, like his "vulnerable moments" during performances and felt the film was made "to honor not just the memory of Jackson but the hard work of a big cast and crew that never made it to opening night", which she felt mostly is a tribute to the "power of Jackson's body and voice". Powers stated she'd felt the film was such "a tragic teaser for the shows that might have been, 'This Is It' hurts. If Jackson had been able to perform as he frequently does during these scenes, he would have accomplished the comeback for which he was so hungry." She noted that Jackson's "total lack of engagement with the cameras adds to the unreal mood" because he was always performing—"but for the imagined masses, not for the filmgoer" and that the film doesn't "entirely acknowledge that reality, and that's a little odd".

"We see Jackson as a perfectionist, a generous boss, a tough taskmaster and a playful child. Off guard and probably unaware that it would ever be seen by the public, we find Jackson pushing his band and production team to the limit with demands to "let it sizzle" and "make the music simmer". Obsessive Jacko fans may be shocked by his Diva-ish behavior as he complains about ear-pieces, but it's heartening to finally view the late singer as a rounded human with regular failings and imperfections. Similarly, a scene featuring Jackson screaming "weeeee!" with childish glee as he moves around the stage on a giant cherry picker, will surely bring a smile to even the most cynical viewer"

— Alex Fletcher of Digital Spy

David Edwards, of Daily Mirror, stated that while he felt that the film is a "success" he overall disliked the film, having felt that "as an exercise in wringing every last penny from Jackson's legacy" the film "most certainly isn't it" a tribute. Alex Fletcher, of Digital Spy described the film as having been an "essential viewing" and praised the film for showing "the real Michael Jackson"—which consisted of "difficult, odd, kind, obsessive and funny". He cited Jackson's best performances as "Thriller" and "Billie Jean" and the "worst material", "Earth Song". However, Fletcher did feel that, while based on the rehearsal footage, Jackson "falls short of his groundbreaking 'Dangerous' and 'Bad' world tours", he noted that Jackson's age and thinness was mostly likely a factor in his performances and described Jackson as having more "star quality and charisma than a million Simon Cowell factory-line production pop singers".

=== Home media ===
This Is It was released on DVD, Blu-ray and UMD in North America on January 26, 2010. It sold over 1.5 million units in the US alone within its first week of release, setting a new record for the first week sales of a music DVD. By the end of 2010, in the US alone, combined Blu-ray and DVD sales stood at 3.2 million, with gross earnings of $55.4 million. The film was released in Japan on the same day, breaking records with $18 million in sales on its first day, consisting of $11.3 million from DVD sales and $6.7 million from Blu-ray sales, surpassing Ponyo's previous record of $6.2 million. In its first week, the title sold 1,039,000 copies in Japan. The film eventually sold more than 1.5 million copies across all formats in the country, with 1.15 million DVD sales. In Ireland, the DVD became the joint-third best-selling music "record" in terms of units, going five-times Platinum by the end of 2010. In France, This Is It was the 6th best selling home video release of the year

==== Certifications ====
Sales certifications for Michael Jackson's This Is It
Region	Certification	Certified units/sales
Ireland (IRMA)	5× Platinum	20,000^{^}
Japan	—	1,150,000
Netherlands (NVPI)	2× Platinum	100,000^{^}
United Kingdom (BPI)	13× Platinum	650,000^{^}
United States	—	3,274,164
^{^} Shipments figures based on certification alone.
