= Cebu Provincial Detention and Rehabilitation Center =

Philippine prison

Cebu Provincial Detention and Rehabilitation Center (CPDRC)
- Location within Visayas Location within Philippines
- Location: Barangay Kalunasan, Cebu City; 10°20′03″N 123°52′53″E
- Status: Operational
- Security class: Maximum security
- Capacity: 1,600
- Managed by: Provincial Government of Cebu

The Cebu Provincial Detention and Rehabilitation Center (CPDRC) is a jail facility in Cebu City, Philippines. It is a maximum-security prison with a capacity of 1,600 inmates.

The prison became well known for its rehabilitation program from 2005 to 2010, which was based on choreographed exercise routines performed by inmates. Known as the CPDRC Dancing Inmates, videos of the inmates performing these routines, supervised by prison chief Byron F. Garcia, became online sensations.

== In popular culture ==
Dancing inmates and jail cells at the CPDRC are featured in the visual documentary Samsara.

The CPDRC was also used as a filming location for the 2017 film A Prayer Before Dawn. The film's climactic boxing scene was filmed at the facility after Thai authorities denied permission to film at the actual Klong Prem Central Prison.

Michael Palin visits the CPDRC in his documentary film and travel book, Michael Palin in the Philippines, in which he watches the choreographed exercise routines and interviews inmates and prison staff.
