= Michael Jackson videography =

Videos and media by American singer

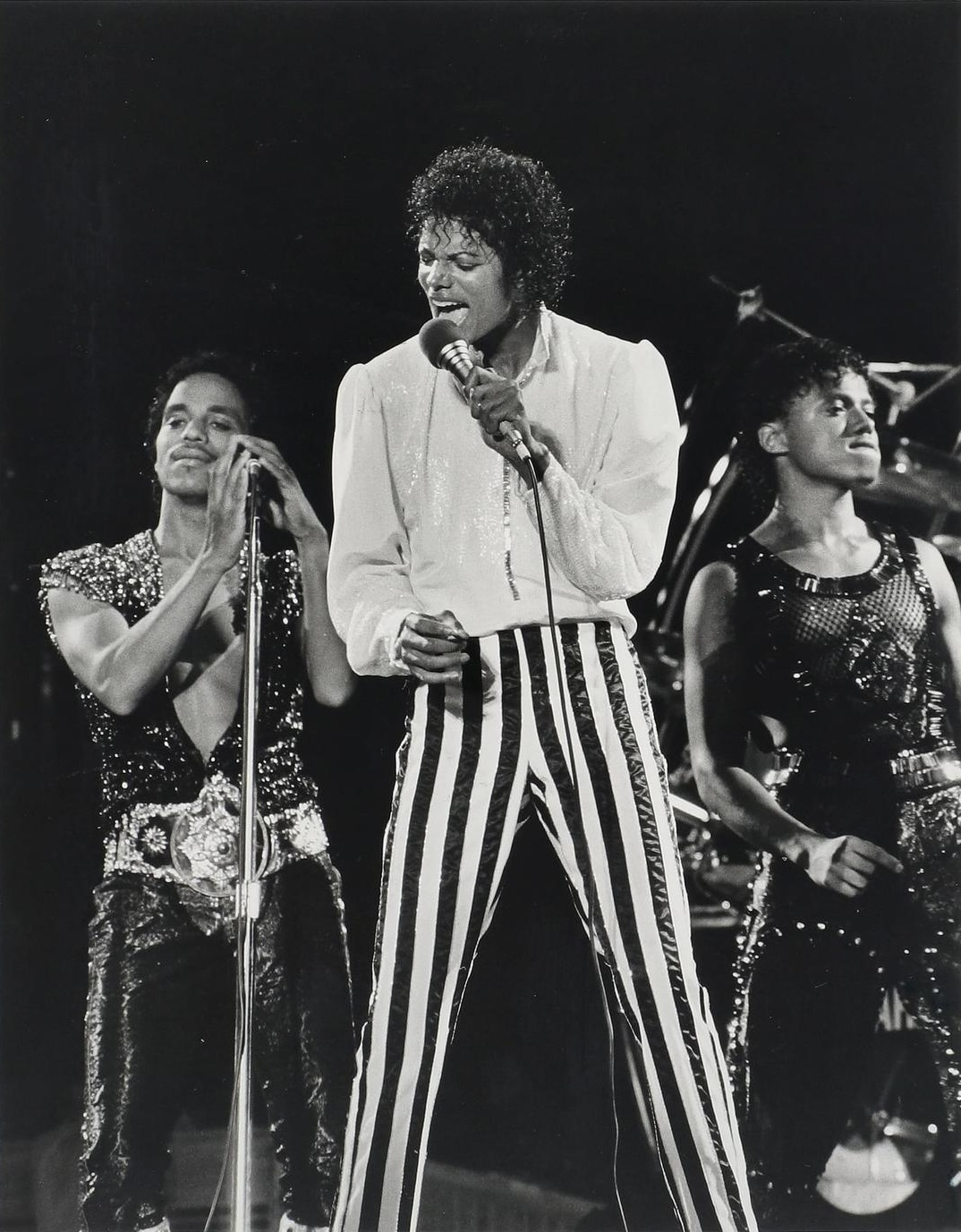
Jackson performing with his brothers in 1984.

American singer Michael Jackson (1958–2009) debuted on the professional music scene at age five as a member of the American family music group The Jackson 5 and began a solo career in 1971 while still part of the group. Jackson promoted seven of his solo albums with music videos or, as he would refer to them, "short films". Some of them drew criticism for their violent and sexual elements while others were lauded by critics and awarded Guinness World Records for their length, success, and cost.

In the early 1980s, Jackson became a dominant figure in popular culture and the first African-American entertainer to have a strong crossover fanbase on MTV. The popularity of his music videos that aired on MTV such as "Billie Jean", "Beat It" and "Thriller"—credited for transforming the music video from a promotional tool into an art form—helped bring fame to the relatively new channel. The success of these music videos helped shift MTV's focus from its original "rock 'n' roll only" format to pop and R&B and saved the channel from financial ruin. Michael Jackson's "Thriller" short film marked a growth in scale for music videos and has been named the most successful music video ever by the Guinness World Records. The 18-minute music video for "Bad", directed by Martin Scorsese, depicts Jackson and Wesley Snipes as members of an inner-city gang. Jackson paid cinematic tribute to West Side Story with the choreography. For the "Smooth Criminal" video, Vincent Paterson created a seeming anti-gravity lean, in which the performer leans forward at a 45-degree angle, beyond their center of gravity. Although the music video for "Leave Me Alone" was not officially released in the United States, it won a Golden Lion Award in 1989 for the quality of the special effects used in its production and a Grammy Award for Best Music Video, Short Form in 1990. Jackson received the MTV Video Vanguard Award in 1988, which was renamed the Michael Jackson Video Vanguard Award in his honor in 1991. He won the MTV Video Vanguard Artist of the Decade Award in 1990.

"Black or White" was released on November 14, 1991. It featured Macaulay Culkin, Tess Harper, George Wendt and Jackson. The video helped introduce morphing, seamlessly changing one image into another, as an important technology in music videos. "Remember the Time" was an elaborate production, with a complex dance routine, set in ancient Egypt featuring appearances by Eddie Murphy, Iman and Magic Johnson. The video for "In the Closet" featured supermodel Naomi Campbell in a courtship dance with Jackson. The music video for "Scream", directed by Mark Romanek and production designer Tom Foden, is one of Jackson's most critically acclaimed. In 1995, it garnered eleven MTV Video Music Award nominations—more than any other music video. A year later, it won a Grammy for Best Music Video, Short Form; shortly afterward, at $7 million, Guinness World Records listed it as the most expensive music video ever made. "Earth Song" was accompanied by an expensive environmentally-themed music video showing images of animal cruelty, deforestation, pollution, and war. Using special effects, time is reversed so that life returns, wars end, and the forests re-grow. Released at the 1996 Cannes Film Festival, Michael Jackson's Ghosts was a short film written by Jackson and Stephen King and directed by Stan Winston. The video for Ghosts is over 38 minutes long and broke the Guinness World Record as the world's longest music video. The music video for "You Rock My World", which is thirteen and a half minutes long, was directed by Paul Hunter and released in 2001. The video features appearances by Chris Tucker and Marlon Brando. The video won an NAACP Image Award for Outstanding Music Video at the award show's 2002 ceremonies.

== List of music videos ==
=== 1970s ===
List of music videos during the 1970s
Title	Year	Other performer(s) credited	Director(s)	Description	Ref(s)
"Don't Stop 'Til You Get Enough"	1979	None	Nick Saxton	The singer's first music video as a solo artist shows a smiling Jackson dancing and singing "Don't Stop 'Til You Get Enough" in a black and white tuxedo with a black bow tie while appearing chroma keyed over a background of abstract geometric figures. At one point, Jackson is seen dancing in triplicate, which was considered innovative at the time.	
"Rock with You"	1979	None	Bruce Gowers	The video features Jackson in a sparkly sequined suit singing the song with a bright laser behind him. It was filmed on the 800 Stage in Los Angeles.	

=== 1980s ===
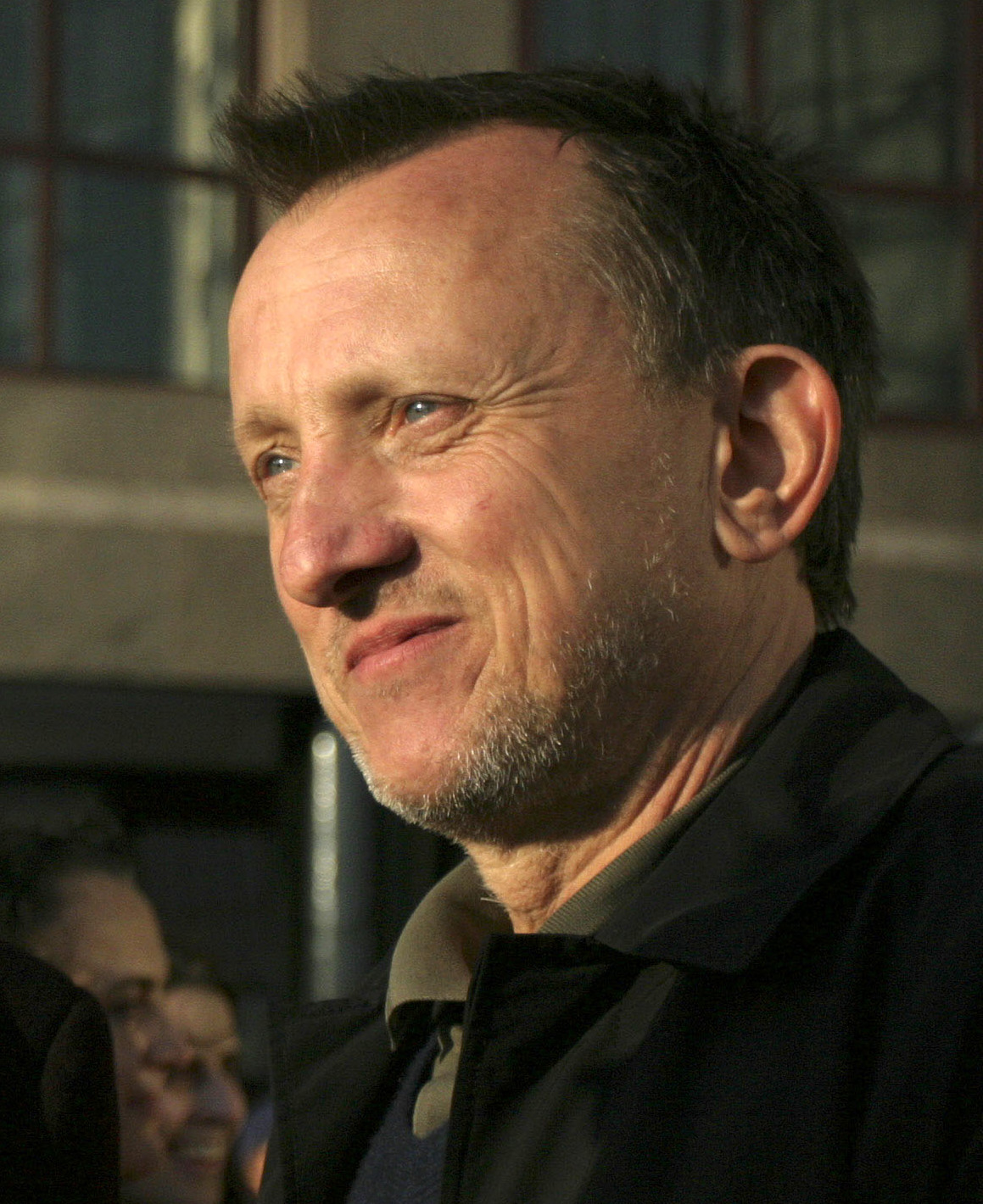
Steve Barron, director of "Billie Jean"

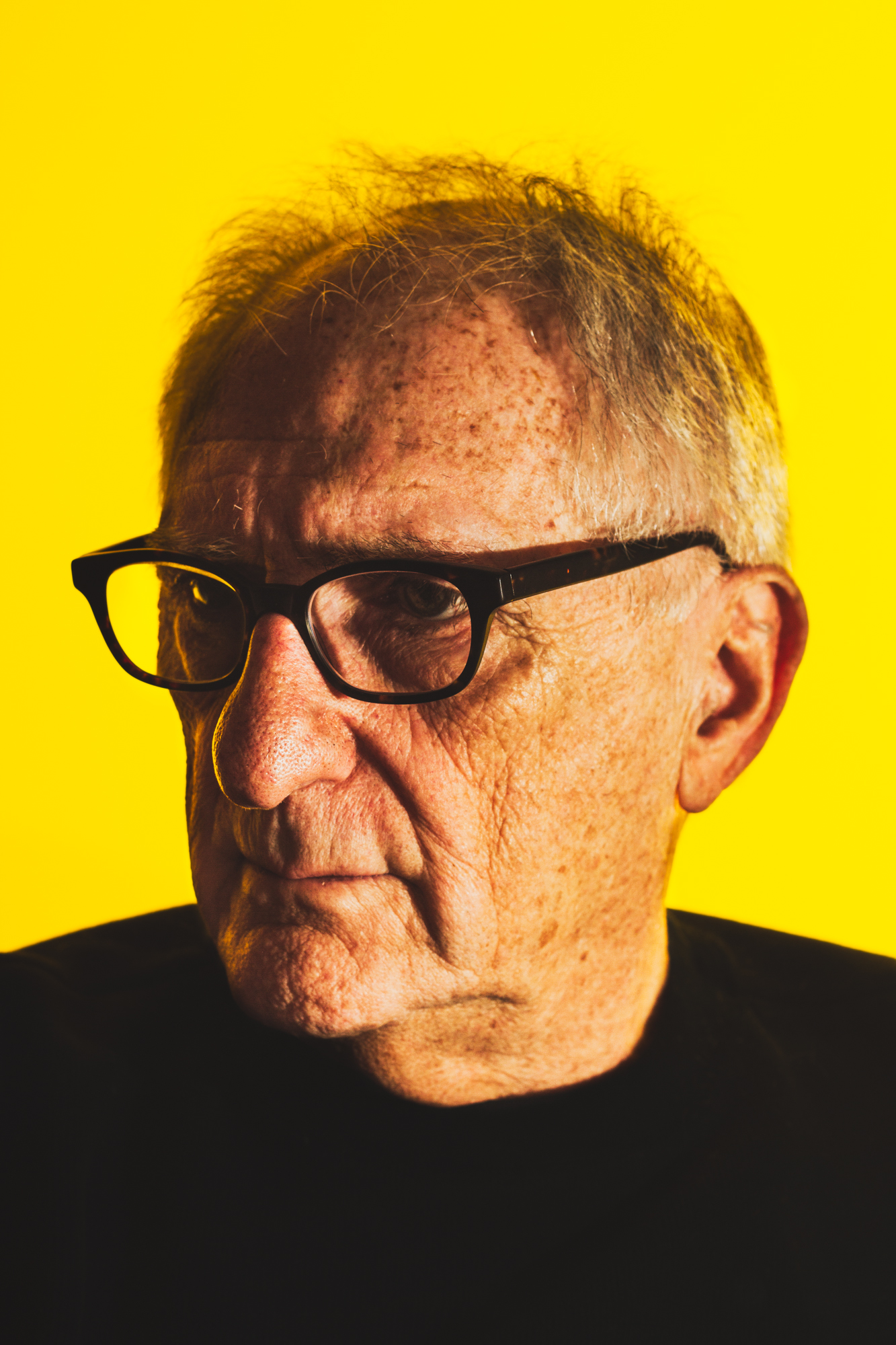
Bob Giraldi, director of "Beat It" and "Say Say Say"

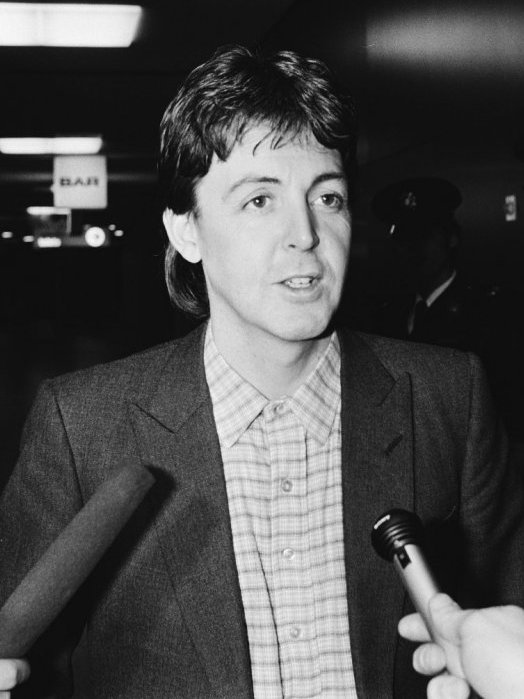
Paul McCartney was featured in the "Say Say Say" video.

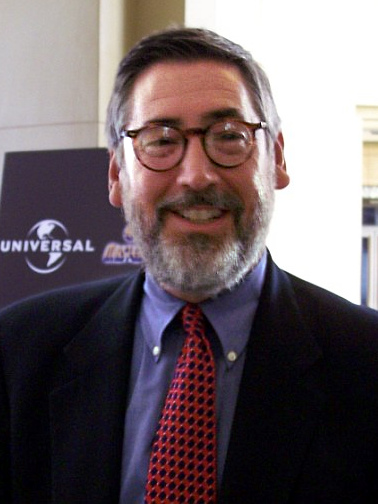
John Landis, director of "Thriller" and "Black or White"

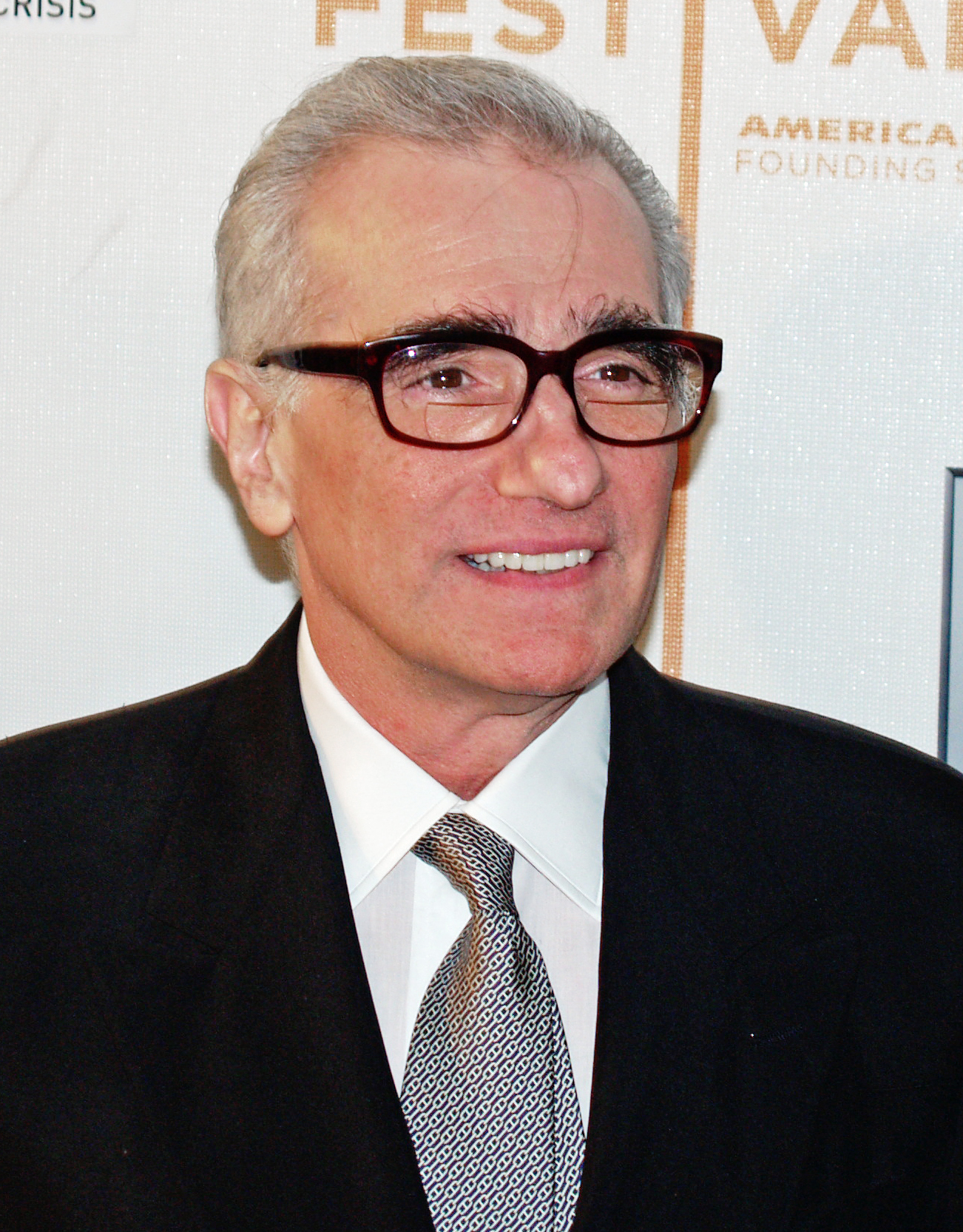
Martin Scorsese, director of "Bad"

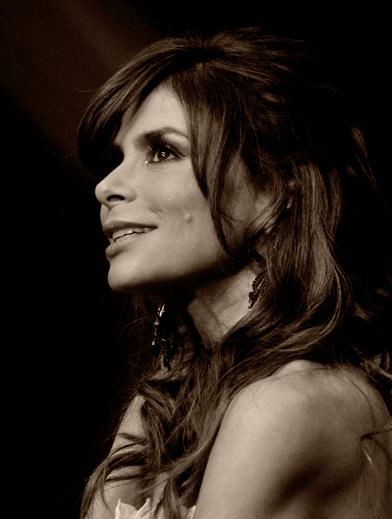
Paula Abdul appears in the "Liberian Girl" video.

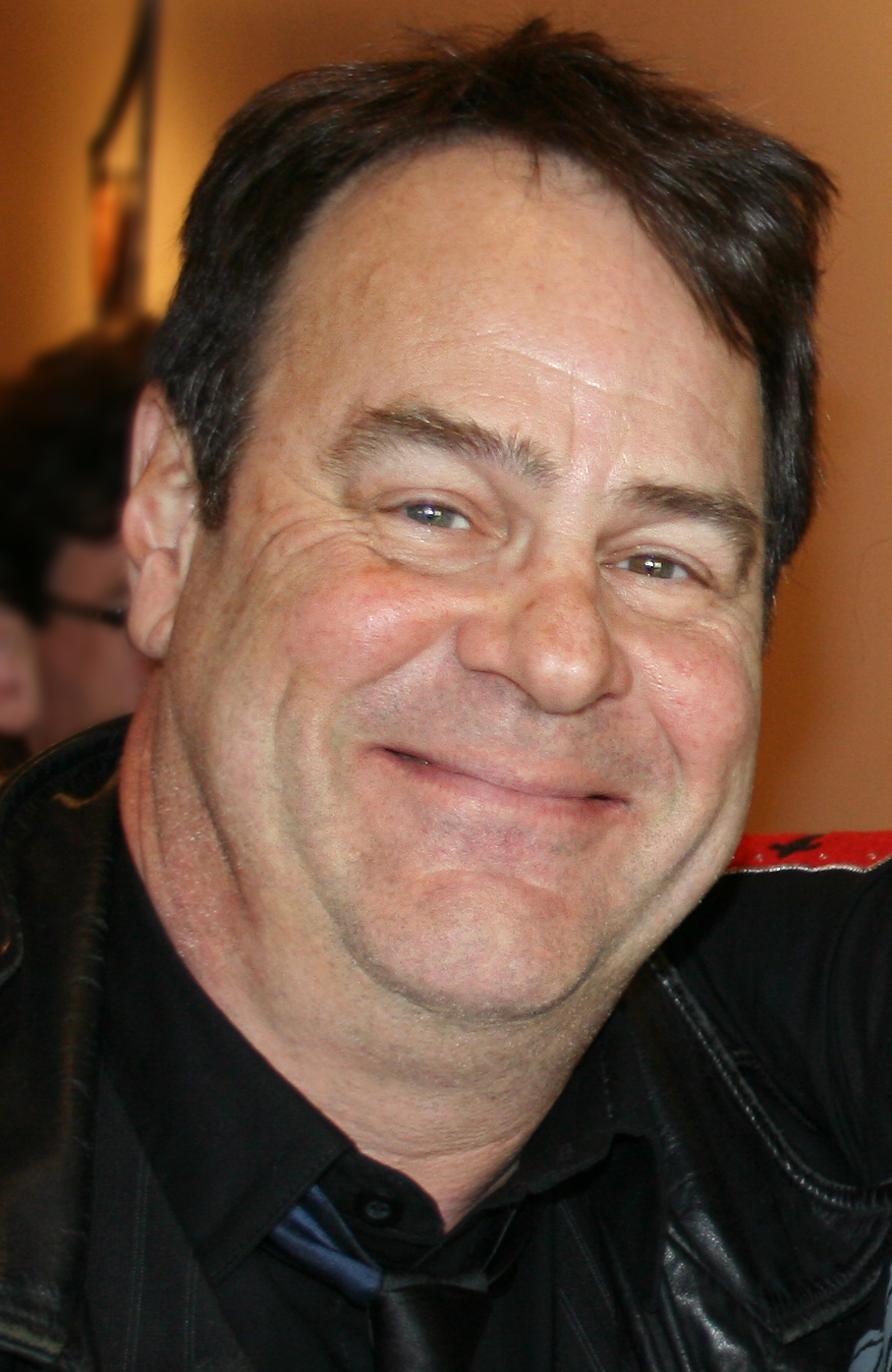
Dan Aykroyd appears in the "Liberian Girl" video.

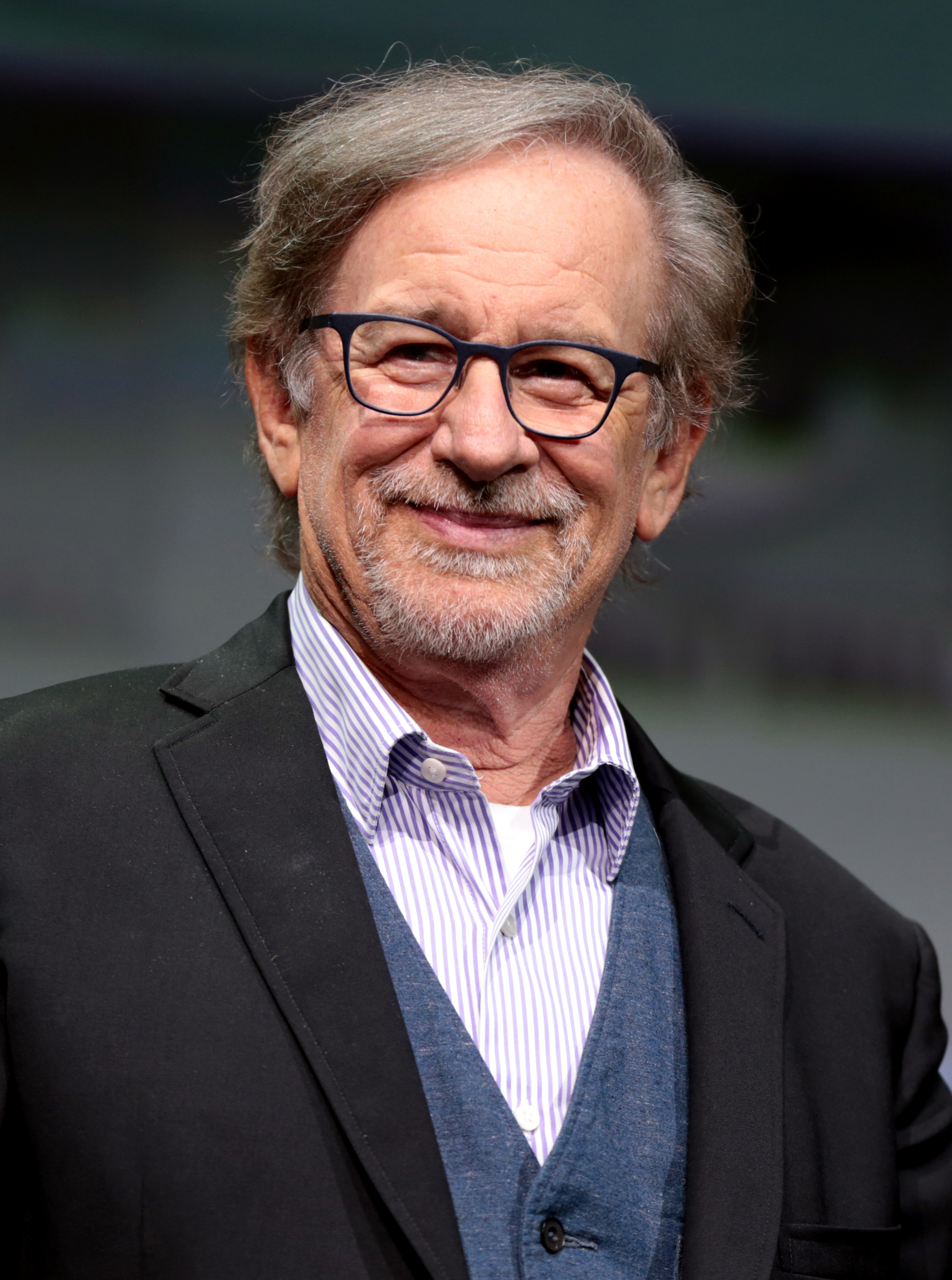
Steven Spielberg appears in the "Liberian Girl" video.

List of music videos during the 1980s
Title	Year	Other performer(s) credited	Director(s)	Description	Ref(s)
"She's Out of My Life"	1980	None	Bruce Gowers	The song's music video features Jackson sitting on a stool in a darkened room, lit by a single spotlight, singing. Use of split-screen technique shows Jackson simultaneously from two different angles during the second and third verses.	
"Billie Jean"	1983	None	Steve Barron	The short film for "Billie Jean" is considered the video that brought MTV, until then a fairly new and unknown music channel, to mainstream attention. It was one of the first videos by a black artist to be aired regularly by the channel, as the network's executives felt black music was not "rock" enough.	
"Beat It"	1983	None	Bob Giraldi	The music video for "Beat It" helped to establish Jackson as an international pop icon. It cost him $150,000 to produce when CBS refused to finance it. The video was filmed on Los Angeles' Skid Row, mainly in locations on East 5th Street. It was choreographed by Michael Peters.	
"Say Say Say"	1983	Paul McCartney	Bob Giraldi	In the short film, the duo plays "Mac and Jack", a pair of con men who sell a "miracle potion". Filmed at Los Alamos near Santa Barbara, California, the video cost $500,000 to produce and features cameo appearances by Paul McCartney's then-wife, Linda, and Jackson's older sister La Toya.	
"Thriller"	1983	None	John Landis	Released over a year after its parent album, Thriller is one of Jackson's most successful music videos. It was filmed at the Palace Theatre in downtown Los Angeles with Ola Ray co-starring as Jackson's love interest. The zombie dance in the video remains a Halloween favorite today. It was choreographed by Michael Peters.	
"We Are the World"	1985	USA for Africa	Tom Trbovich	This music video shows Jackson with other members of the supergroup United Support of Artists (USA) for Africa recording the charity single in a studio.	
"Bad"	1987	None	Martin Scorsese	The video is an 18-minute short film written by novelist and screenwriter Richard Price. Jackson portrays a private school student named Darryl, who is home on vacation. Darryl meets up with his old friends, including gang leader, Mini Max, played by Wesley Snipes. Darryl wants to prove to his friends that private school has not changed him—he's still "Bad". To do so, he takes his friends to a subway station to rob an elderly man, but Darryl has a change of heart and Mini Max chastises him for it. The camera then pans away to show Darryl surrounded by a different gang, who all break into song and dance to prove "Who's Bad".	
"The Way You Make Me Feel"	1987	None	Joe Pytka	The short version of the video is 6 minutes and 34 seconds long; the full version is 9 minutes and 33 seconds in length. The video begins with a group of men attempting to get the attention of women. Jackson's character appears to stand apart from the group in his approach to attracting the attention of their female counterparts. Former model Tatiana Thumbtzen plays Jackson's love interest in the video. After playfully chasing her throughout the video and captivating her through dance, the video ends with them in a warm embrace. Joe Seneca and Sean Cheesman have minor roles in the video. It was choreographed by Vincent Paterson.	
"Man in the Mirror"	1988	None	Donald Wilson	This video differs from Jackson's others because he does not appear in it, apart from a brief clip toward the end where he can be seen donning a red jacket and standing in a large crowd. It features a montage of clips of children in Africa, Martin Luther King Jr., Mother Teresa, Mahatma Gandhi, Nelson Mandela, kids at graduation, and other historical figures.	
"Dirty Diana"	1988	None	Joe Pytka	Joe Pytka directed the five-minute music video for this song. It was choreographed by Vincent Paterson. Model Lisa Dean appears in it. A second seven-minute-long accompanying video of a live performance (not to be confused with the actual music video) was filmed in early 1988 before a live audience during a Jackson show at Madison Square Garden.	
"Another Part of Me"	1988	None	Patrick Kelly	The video features Jackson performing the song live during his Bad World Tour. The film footage was taken on July 22, 1988, at Wembley Stadium, with additional footage coming from the June 27–28 shows at Parc des Princes in Paris and from the show at Volksparkstadion in Hamburg on July 1.	
"Smooth Criminal"	1988	None	Colin Chilvers	In the music video, Michael Jackson and the dancers immediately around him perform a seemingly impossible forward lean. It was conceived and choreographed by Vincent Paterson and Jeffrey Daniel. Michael created his solo choreography.Paterson created a seemingly anti-gravity lean using old stage techniques.	
"Speed Demon"	1988	None	Jerry Kramer; Will Vinton	Jackson filmed a promotional video for the song, seen first as a segment in the anthology film Moonwalker (1988). It is directed by Will Vinton, who produced it with Jerry Kramer, Michael Jackson, and Frank Dileo. It was choreographed by Vincent Paterson.	
"Come Together"	1988	None	Jerry Kramer; Colin Chilvers	Jackson filmed this as a promotional video for the song, which was originally a segment of his 1988 film Moonwalker.	
"Leave Me Alone"	1988	None	Jim Blashfield	Fueled by Jackson's anti-media anger, the video sees the singer ride through a funhouse of newspaper clippings reporting on his eccentric behavior. The video took nine months to produce: the filmed footage was cut into stills, which were then edited using stop motion animation.	
"2300 Jackson Street"	1989	The Jacksons; Marlon Jackson; Janet Jackson; Rebbie Jackson	Greg Gold	The video features most of the Jackson family members, including Michael. Some scenes include the Jackson family playing pool and the Jackson brothers playing football. It also shows the Jackson family singing the song together. The video was shot in March 1989 in Hayvenhurst, Encino, Los Angeles.	
"Liberian Girl"	1989	None	Jim Yukich	The music video features many of Jackson's celebrity friends—Paula Abdul, Dan Aykroyd, Danny Glover, Steven Spielberg, John Travolta, Olivia Newton-John, among others—who gathered on a sound stage to film the music video for "Liberian Girl", only to discover that Jackson had been filming them all along.	

=== 1990s ===
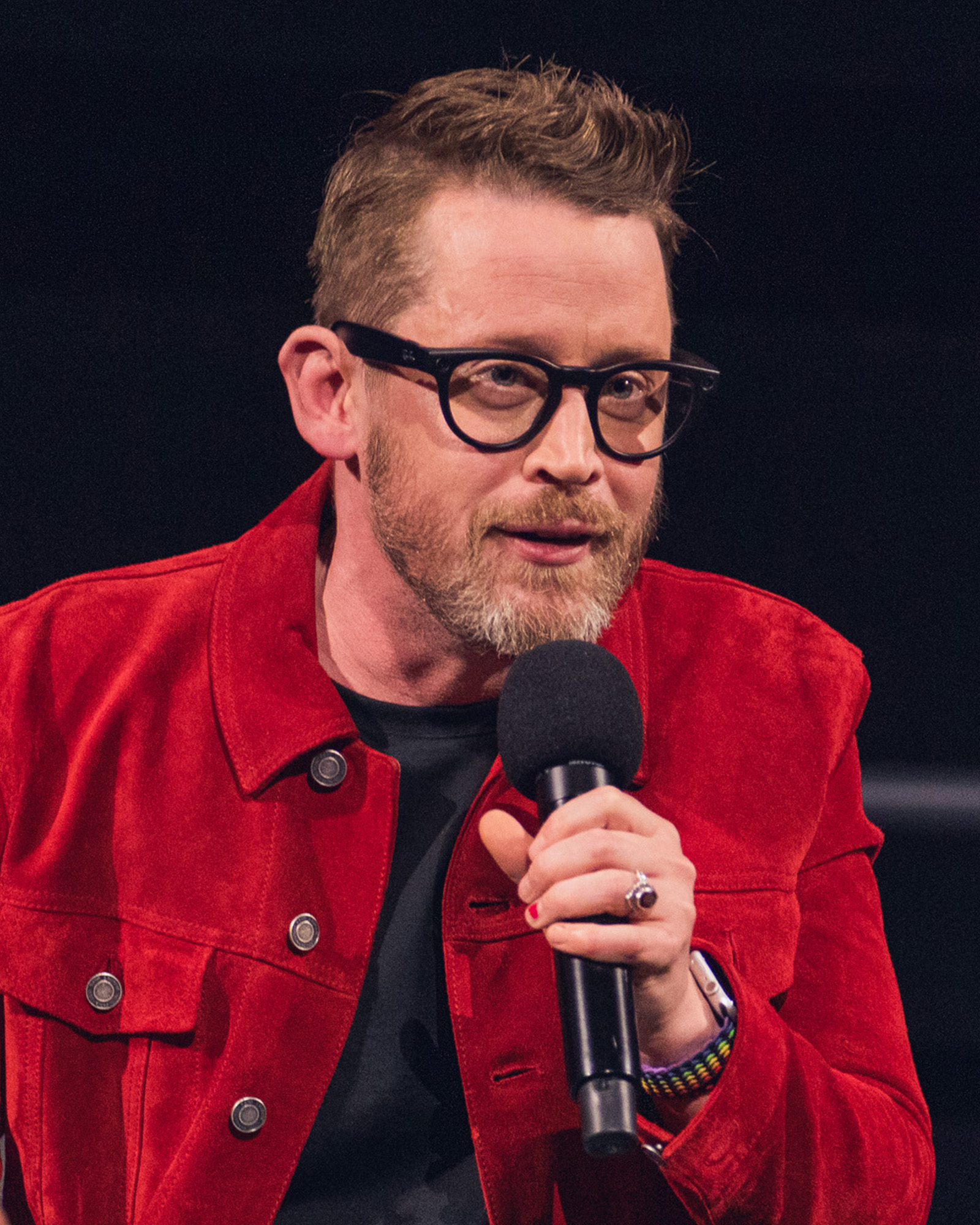
Macaulay Culkin appears in the "Black or White" video.

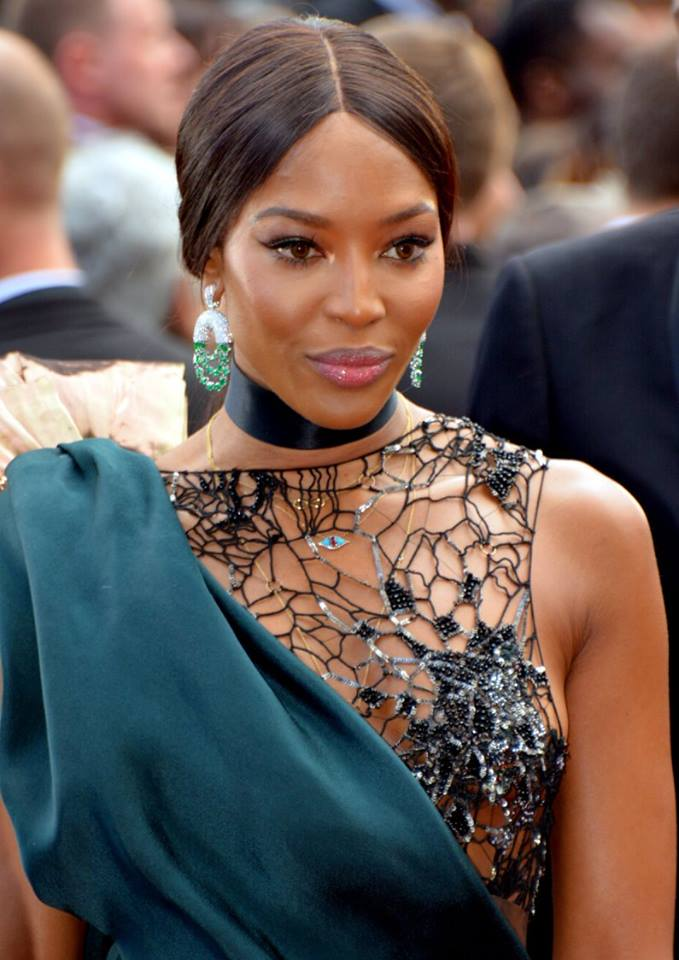
Naomi Campbell appears in the "In the Closet" video.

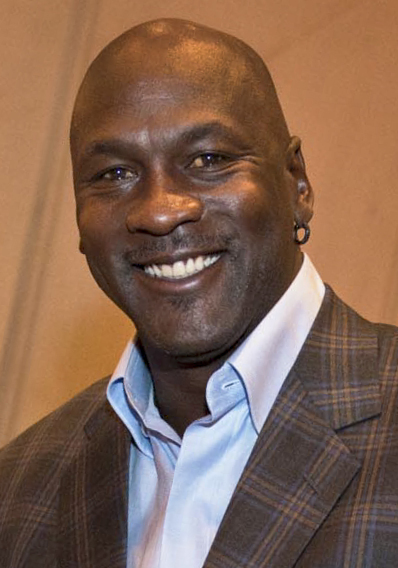
Michael Jordan appears in the "Jam" video.

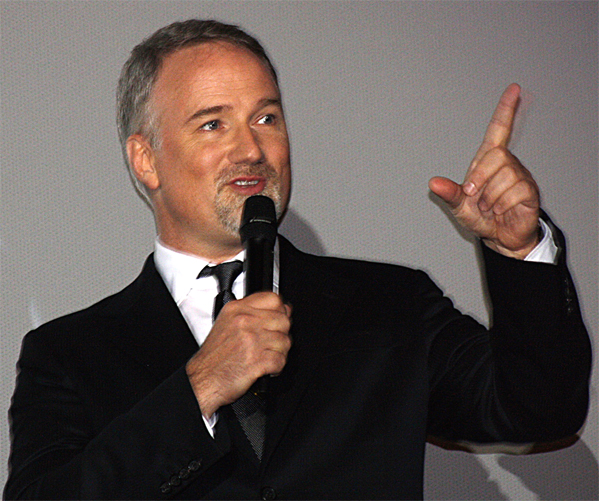
David Fincher, director of "Who Is It"

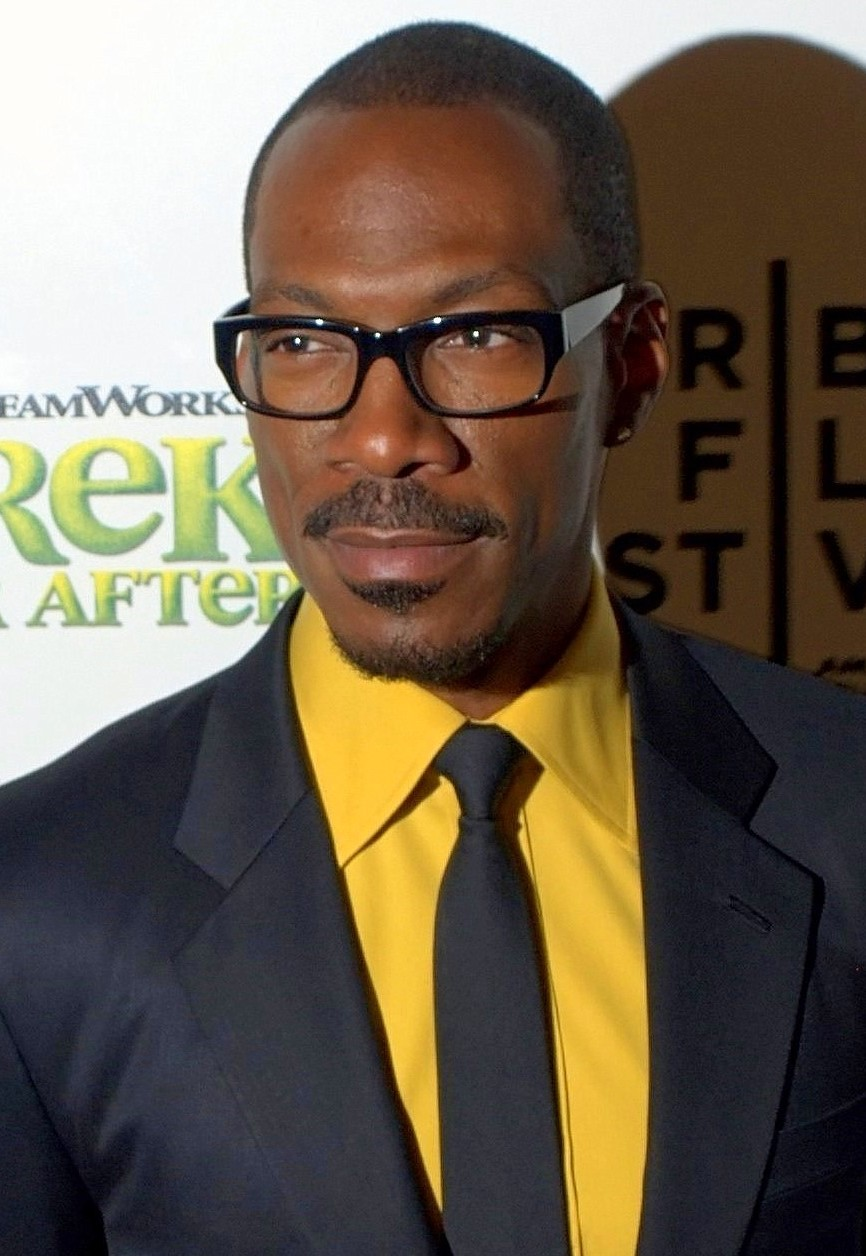
Eddie Murphy was featured in "Whatzupwitu" and made a cameo appearance in "Remember the Time" video.

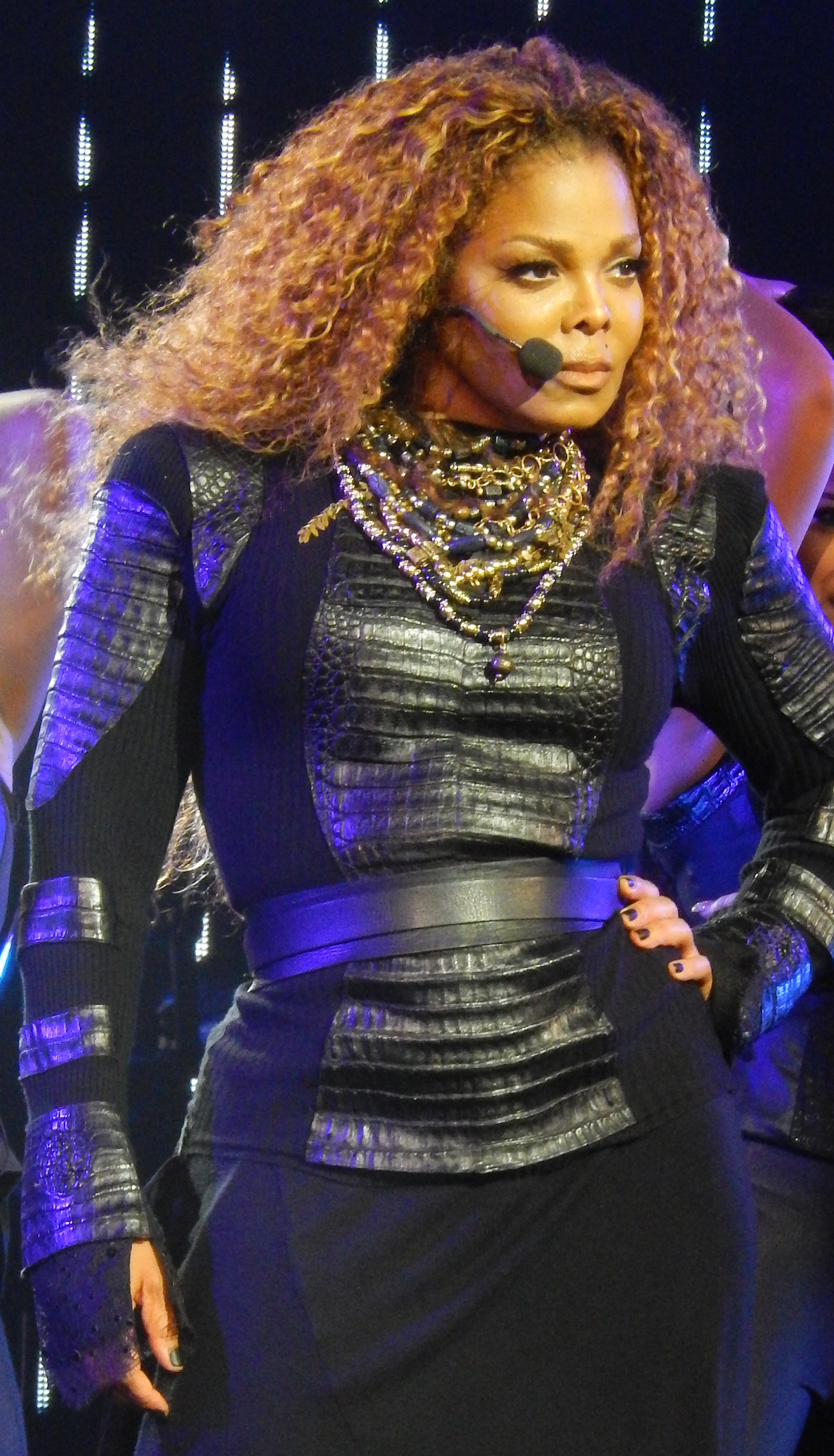
Janet Jackson was featured in "Scream" video.

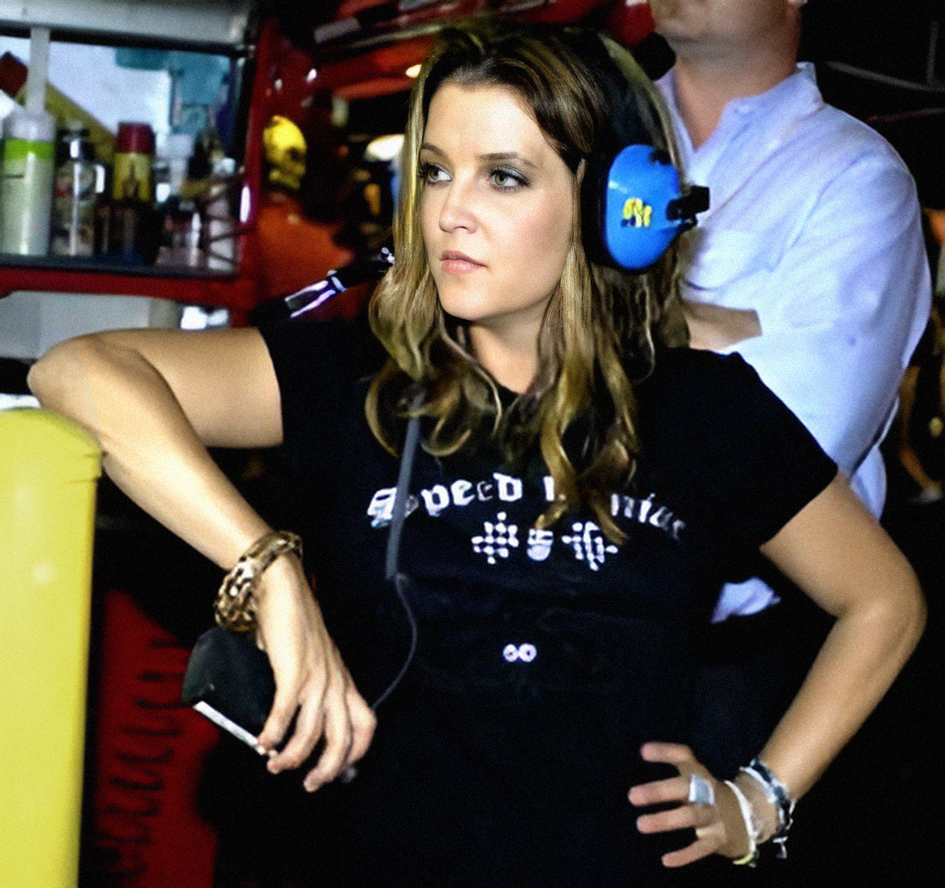
Lisa Marie Presley appears in the "You Are Not Alone" video.

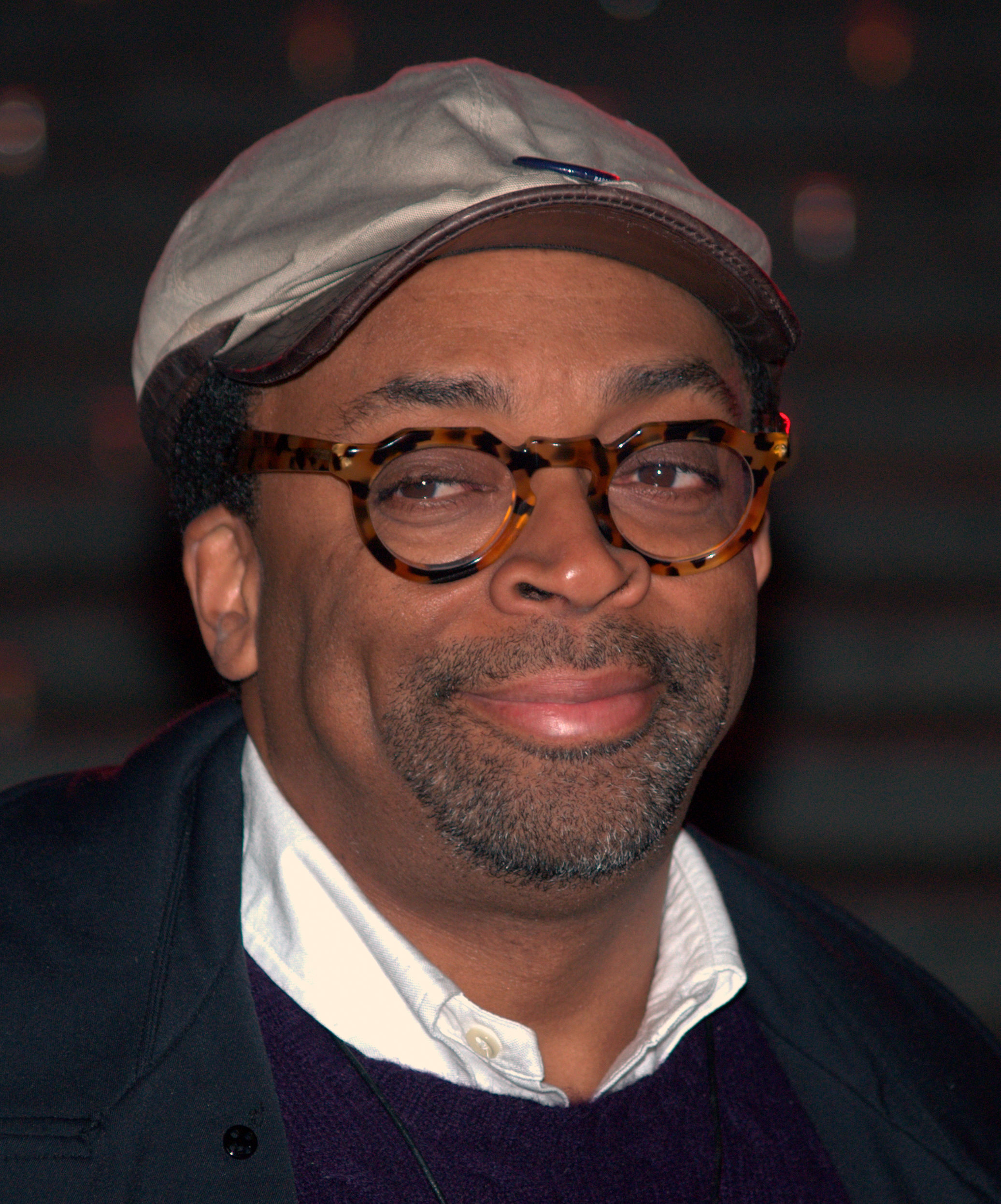
Spike Lee, director of "They Don't Care About Us"

List of music videos during the 1990s
Title	Year	Other performer(s) credited	Director(s)	Description	Ref(s)
"Black or White"	1991	None	John Landis	The video features Macaulay Culkin, Tess Harper, and George Wendt. An extended version contains a scene where a black panther transforms into Jackson and dances, followed by a brief appearance by The Simpsons characters Bart and Homer Simpson. This was the second time John Landis and Jackson worked together, the previous time being Thriller. Vincent Paterson choreographed it.	
"Remember the Time"	1992	None	John Singleton	A nine-minute video directed by John Singleton and promoted as a "short film" was released to promote Dangerous. Choreographed by Fatima Robinson, it is set in ancient Egypt and features what has been described as "elaborate special effects" and appearances by Eddie Murphy, Iman, The Pharcyde, Magic Johnson, Tom "Tiny" Lister, Jr., and Wylie Draper. The video features Jackson's first on-screen kiss, with Iman as Nefertiti.	
"In the Closet"	1992	None	Herb Ritts	This sepia-colored music video features Jackson performing sensual dance routines with supermodel Naomi Campbell. The spoken vocals by Princess Stéphanie of Monaco were re-recorded by Campbell for the video. The clip was filmed in Salton Sea, California.	
"Who Is It"	1992	None	David Fincher	In the music video, Jackson is featured falling in love with a high-priced escort and staring sadly at the city skyline.	
"Jam"	1992	Heavy D	David Kellogg	Rap duo Kris Kross and Michael Jordan make cameo appearances in the video. Both Jordan and Jackson teach one another their special talents—Jordan's basketball skills and Jackson's "moonwalk".	
"Heal the World"	1992	None	Joe Pytka	The music video features children living in countries suffering from civil unrest, especially Burundi. It is also one of only a handful that does not feature Jackson.	
"Give In to Me"	1993	None	Andy Morahan	Shot in Munich, Germany, this features Jackson performing the song on stage at an indoor rock concert with ex-Living Colour bassist Muzz Skillings, Guns N' Roses guitarists Slash and Gilby Clarke, and the band's touring keyboardist Teddy Andreadis.	
"Will You Be There"	1993	None	Vincent Paterson	The music video features Jackson performing the song during his Dangerous World Tour and footage from Free Willy. A second video, also directed and choreographed by Vincent Paterson, appeared initially in Dangerous: The Short Films and contained the full length of MTV's 10th Anniversary special performance of the song intercut with the Dangerous World Tour footage and footage of Jackson's fans.	
"Whatzupwitu"	1993	Eddie Murphy	Wayne Isham; Klasky Csupo	Jackson and Murphy instantly materialize from a cosmic cloud in this video. The pair playfully sing and dance as peace signs and music notes scroll across the screen behind them. This was the second time Murphy and Jackson had worked together, the first being for the music video for "Remember the Time".	
"Gone Too Soon"	1993	None	Bill DiCicco	The footage in the music video features scenes of Jackson and Ryan White together, as well as brief coverage of White's funeral. Home movies, provided by White's mother Jeanne, are also seen in the short film.	
"HIStory Teaser"	1995	None	Rupert Wainwright	This served as a promotional music video for Michael Jackson's HIStory: Past, Present and Future, Book I studio album.	
"Scream"	1995	Janet Jackson	Mark Romanek	The music video is 4 minutes and 46 seconds long and was choreographed by Travis Payne, LaVelle Smith Jr., Tina Landon, Sean Cheesman, and Sacha Lucashenko. It features a dystopic, playful spaceship dance-off between Jackson and his sister Janet. The video cost $7 million to make.	
"Childhood"	1995	None	Nick Brandt	Jason James Richter and Francis Capra, actors from the movie Free Willy 2, both make a cameo appearance in the video.	
"You Are Not Alone"	1995	None	Wayne Isham	The video features temple scenes that are an homage to Maxfield Parrish's 1922 painting Daybreak and theater scenes that were filmed at the Pantages Theatre, in Los Angeles. Lisa Marie Presley, Jackson's wife at the time, appears in an affectionate semi-nude scene with him.	
"Earth Song"	1995	None	Nick Brandt	The video was filmed in three geographic regions (the Americas, Europe, and Africa). The first location is the Amazon rainforest; the natives who appear in the video are not actors. The second scene is a war zone in Karlovac, Croatia, with Croatian actor Slobodan Dimitrijević and the area's residents. Tanzania is the third location, where scenes of illegal poaching and hunting are incorporated into the video. The final location is in Warwick, New York, where a forest fire is simulated in a cornfield.	
"Why"	1996	3T	Ralph Ziman	The video featured 3T and Jackson and is shot in black and white. It was released in Michael Jackson's box set, Michael Jackson's Vision.	
"They Don't Care About Us" (Brazil version)	1996	None	Spike Lee	This video is one of two made for the single. The first was filmed in Salvador (Pelourinho) and Rio de Janeiro. Jackson collaborated with 200 members of the cultural group Olodum, who "sway ... to the heavy beat of Salvador's samba-reggae music". There is a short (4 min.) and extended version (7 min.) of this video. The extended version of this video, which features more scenes of Olodum playing music with Jackson, was first included in the 1997 video album HIStory on Film, Volume II.	
"They Don't Care About Us" (Prison version)	1996	None	Spike Lee	One of two music videos made for the single, this one was filmed in a prison. Jackson is seen handcuffed. It also contains actual footage of police attacking African Americans, the military crackdown against the protest in Tiananmen Square, the Ku Klux Klan, war crimes, genocide, execution, martial law, and other human rights abuses.	
"Stranger in Moscow"	1996	None	Nick Brandt	Shot in Los Angeles, this video is based on Jackson's personal life, portraying him walking around looking for new people to talk to, which he did in real life.	
"Blood on the Dance Floor"	1997	None	Vincent Paterson	In the video, Jackson shows sexual attraction towards a dancing woman in a salsa dance hall. Choreographed by Vincent Paterson.	
"Blood on the Dance Floor (Refugee Camp Mix)"	1997	None	Vincent Paterson	Released on May 20, 1997, as part of the HIStory on Film, Volume II video album. Second music video for "Blood on the Dance Floor" featuring shots not seen in the original video.	
"HIStory (Tony Moran's HIStory Lesson)"	1997	Boyz II Men	Unknown	The video features scenes from Jackson's short film Ghosts and live performances from the Bad World Tour and the Dangerous World Tour.	
"Ghosts"	1997	None	Stan Winston	In the video, Jackson plays an eccentric man with supernatural powers trying to be forced out of a small town by its residents and judgmental mayor (also played by Jackson).	

=== 2000s ===
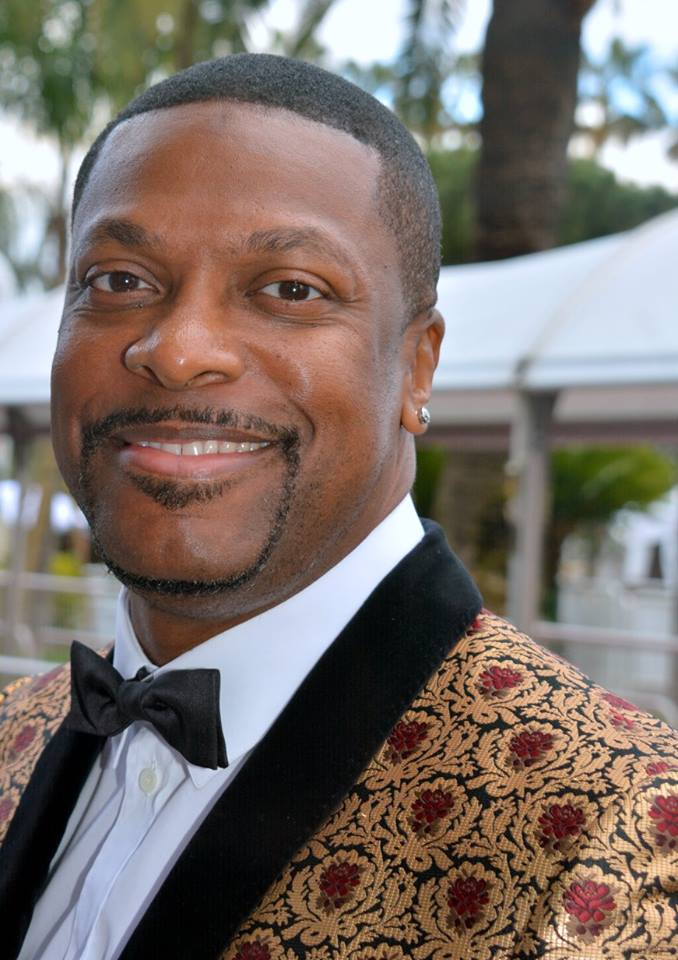
Chris Tucker appears in the video for "You Rock My World".

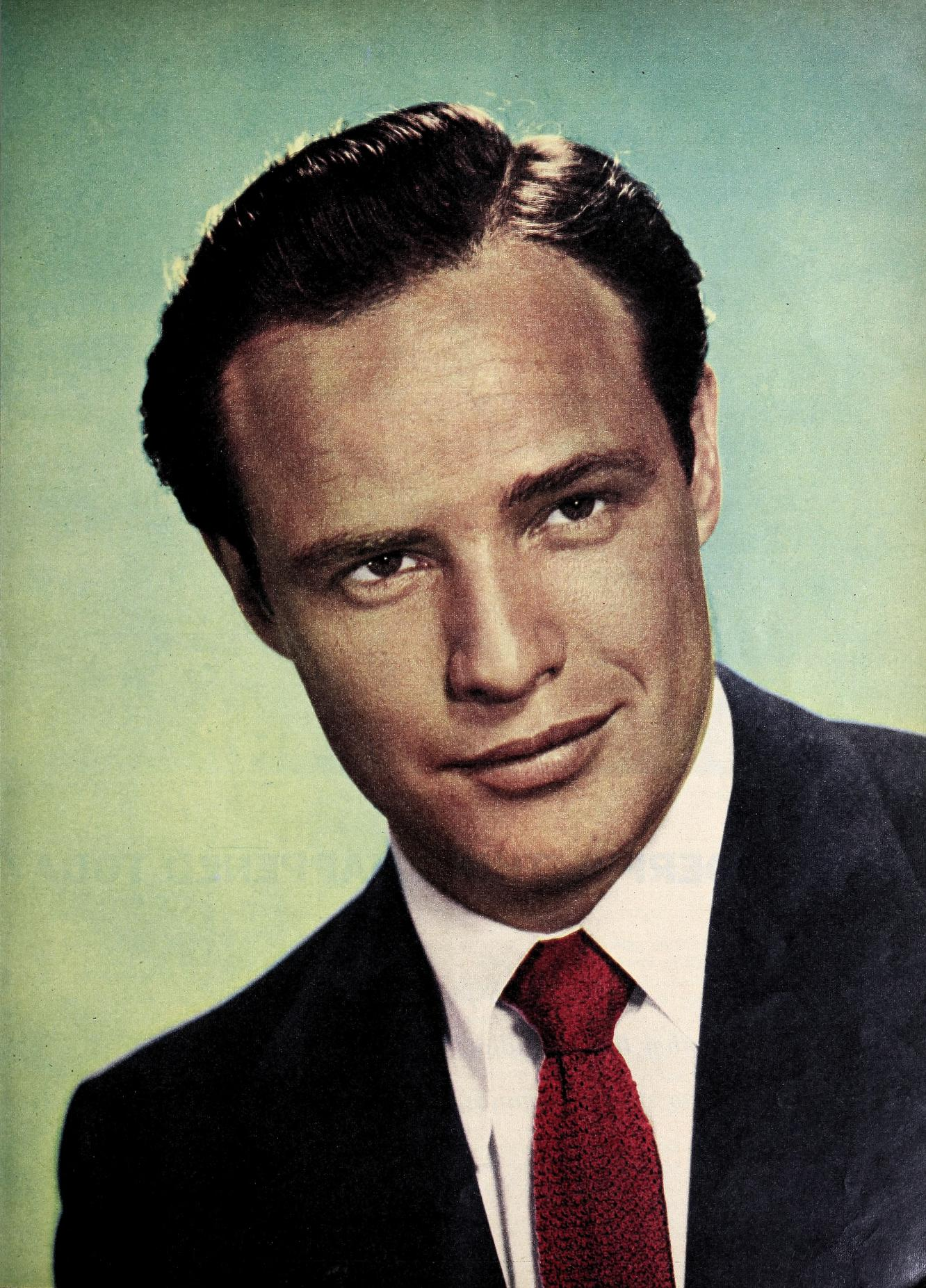
Marlon Brando also appears in the video for "You Rock My World".

List of music videos during the 2000s
Title	Year	Other performer(s) credited	Director(s)	Description	Ref(s)
"You Rock My World"	2001	None	Paul Hunter	The video, which is over thirteen minutes long, was described as a short film. Chris Tucker, Marlon Brando, Michael Madsen, and Billy Drago appear in it.	
"Cry"	2001	None	Nick Brandt	The video was filmed in six different locations, five of which were in California and another in Nevada. People featured in the video include members of a real-life gospel group.	
"What More Can I Give"	2001	The All Stars	Unknown	The song for the music video was created as a charity single for 9/11. It features Celine Dion, NSYNC, Mariah Carey and Destiny's Child.	
"Cheater"	2004	None	Unknown	The music video features clips from the Live in Bucharest: The Dangerous Tour DVD; the track is included in The Ultimate Collection, released in 2004.	
"This Is It" (Film version)	2009	None	Kenny Ortega	A video made up of scenes of Jackson rehearsing for his This Is It concerts as seen in his posthumous documentary film Michael Jackson's This Is It. The video was uploaded to YouTube on November 25, 2009.	
"This Is It" (Official version)	2009	None	Spike Lee	The video premiered posthumously on the webpage of Spike Lee's production company 40 Acres and a Mule Filmworks. Almost five minutes long, it features scenes of Jackson's hometown and former residence in Gary, Indiana, along with photos and videos of him and tributes from his fans around the world.	

=== 2010s ===
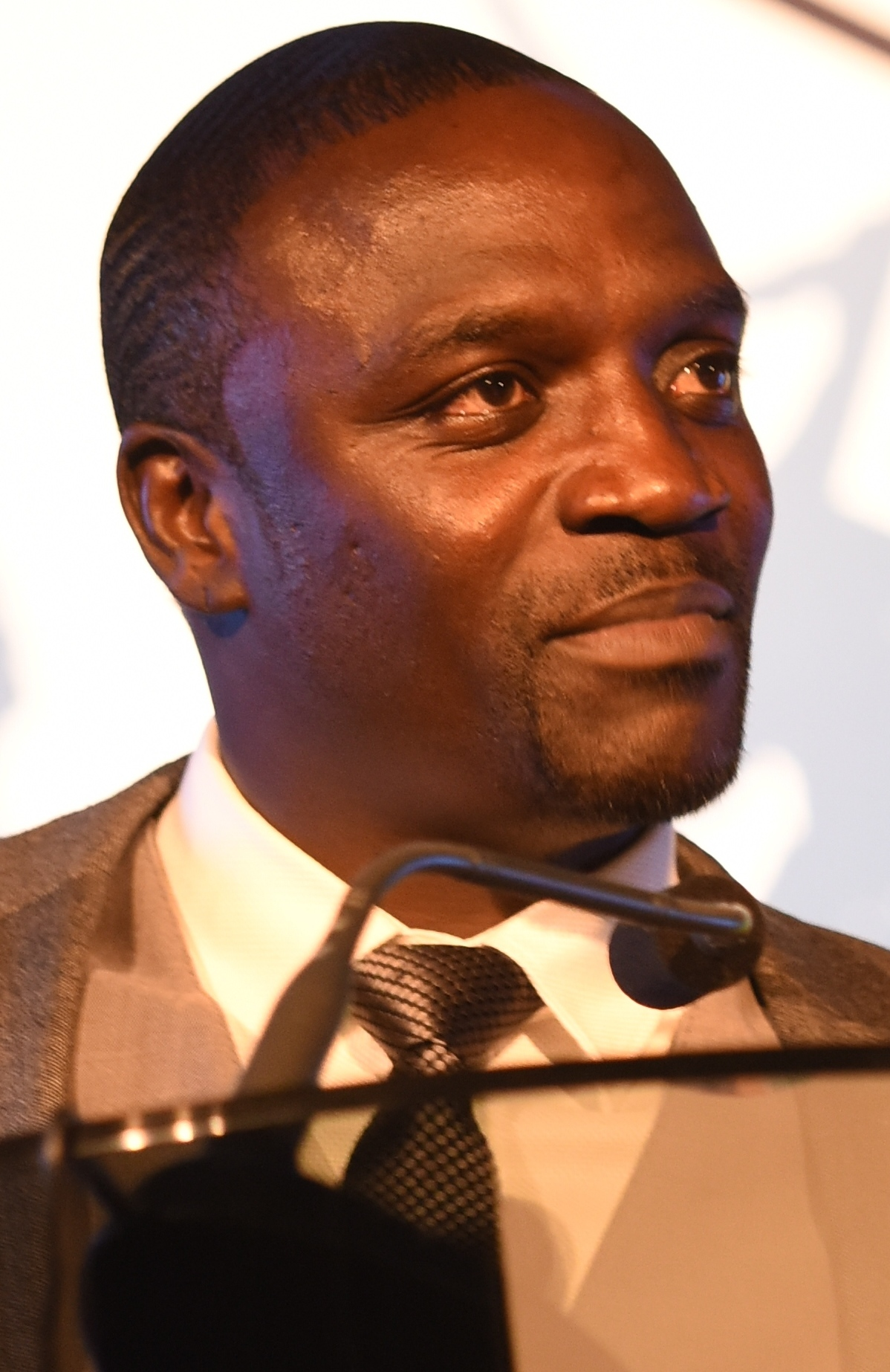
Akon was featured in the video for "Hold My Hand".

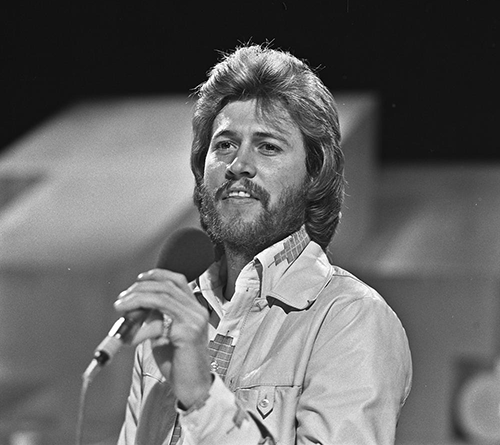
Barry Gibb appears with Jackson in the video for "All in Your Name".

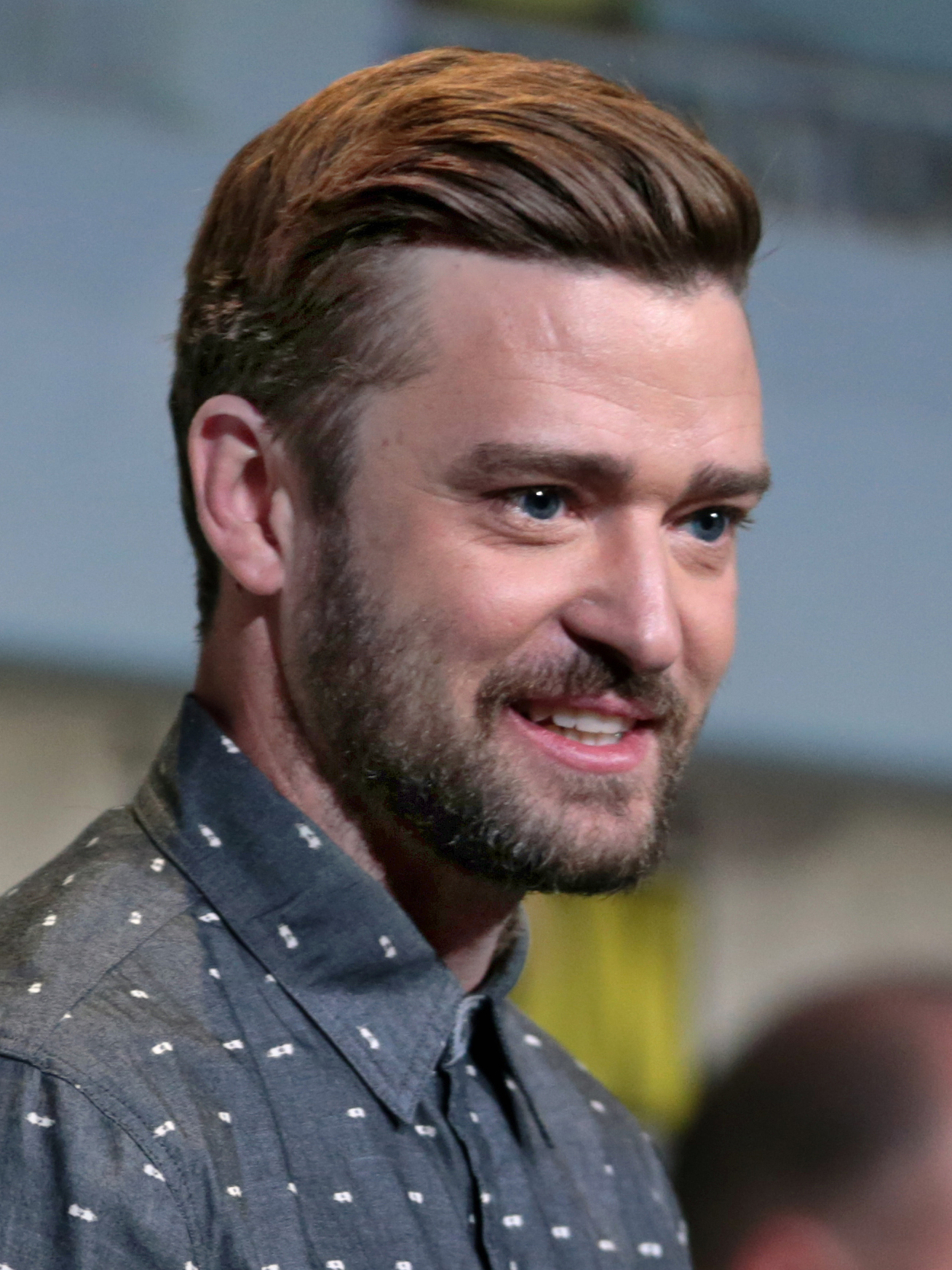
Justin Timberlake was featured in the duet video for "Love Never Felt So Good".

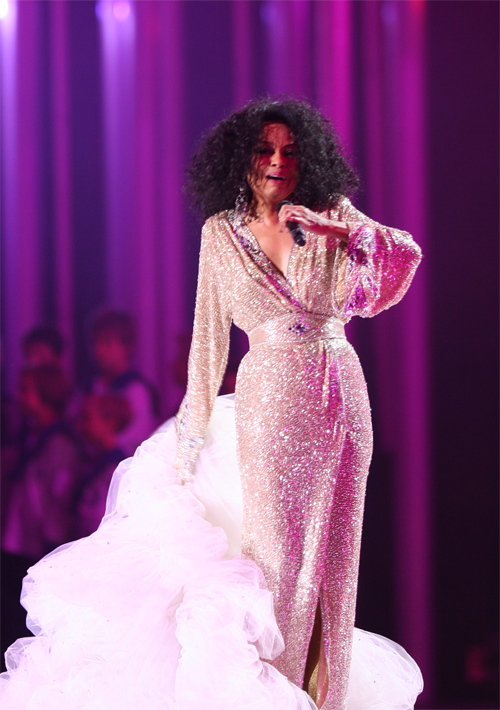
Diana Ross is featured with Jackson, as Dorothy and the Scarecrow, respectively, on the music video for "Ease On down the Road", from the film The Wiz.

List of music videos during the 2010s
Title	Year	Other performer(s) credited	Director(s)	Description	Ref(s)
"We Are the World 25 for Haiti"	2010	Artists for Haiti	Paul Haggis	This song's music video is formatted similarly to the original "We Are the World". It opens with the title and the recording artists' signatures surrounding it. Clips of them performing their parts in the recording studio and archive footage of Michael Jackson performing his part of the song form the basis of the video. The video is intercut with clips showing people in Haiti after the earthquake.	
"One More Chance"	2010	None	Nick Brandt	Released in its incomplete form, this video features Jackson dancing on tabletops for a group of fans standing on an elevated stage watching him perform.	
"Hold My Hand"	2010	Akon	Mark Pellington	There was a casting call posted on Jackson's official website looking for fans to participate in this video. The video is a compilation of archived Jackson performances and fans paying tribute to their hero, while Akon is featured singing throughout.	
"Hollywood Tonight"	2011	None	Wayne Isham	This video was shot in front of the Pantages Theatre in Hollywood, California. Sofia Boutella portrays the lead dancer in the video.	
"The Behind the Mask Project"	2011	None	Dennis Liu	"The Behind the Mask Project" is a music video edited together from homemade fan video contributions from around the world set to the song "Behind the Mask".	
"All in Your Name"	2011	Barry Gibb	Barry Gibb	The video shows previously unseen footage of Barry Gibb recording an unreleased track of the song with Jackson in 2002. The video was initially released on Gibb's website after the release of the song.	
"Love Never Felt So Good"	2014	Justin Timberlake	Rich Lee; Justin Timberlake	Premiered on May 14, 2014, the video features a crowd of young dancers with Justin Timberlake singing along and performing some of Jackson's signature moves over different backdrops inspired by and showing Jackson's videos and live performances.	
"Blue Gangsta"	2014	None	Cameron McKinlay	Published on May 14, 2014, to Jackson's official VEVO page. Inspired by the short film for "Smooth Criminal", dancers from Michael Jackson: The Immortal World Tour celebrated the release of the Xscape album with this music video choreographed to "Blue Gangsta." A shortened edit of the 2010 leaked version of the song was used in the video.	
"Love Never Felt So Good" (Classic MJ x version)	2014	None	Rich Lee	A shortened video lasting only 2 minutes and 13 seconds mainly composed of Jackson's archive footage set to the song, mostly as it appeared in the duet video with Justin Timberlake, with some added CGI visuals showing a Jackson artwork and some of the song's lyrics. Published on May 15, 2014.	
"Love Never Felt So Good" (Solo version)	2014	None	Rich Lee; Justin Timberlake	Premiered on June 19, 2014, this version mostly features clips from Jackson's music videos along with some of Jackson's live performances. The crowd of young dancers from the duet video also appears singing along and performing some of Jackson's signature moves.	
"A Place with No Name"	2014	None	Samuel Bayer	The video weaves rare clips from Jackson's "In the Closet" video shoot. A second music video was released on Michael Jackson's Vevo page, with choreographed dances performed by the dancers of Cirque du Soleil's "Michael Jackson: One".	
"Say Say Say (2015 Remix)"	2015	Paul McCartney	Ryan Heffington	Paul McCartney released this music video that unveiled new vocal recordings by Jackson.	
"Blood on the Dance Floor x Dangerous (The White Panda Mash-Up)"	2017	None	Unknown	It is a mash-up video composed of clips from previous Jackson videos—"Blood on the Dance Floor", "Ghosts", "You Rock My World", "Leave Me Alone" and "Black or White". Some of the clips from previous videos now appear in black and white.	
"Blood on the Dance Floor" (2017 version)	2017	None	Unknown	The video combines Jackson's short film with newly shot footage of the cast of "Michael Jackson: ONE" by Cirque du Soleil in supporting roles.	
"Behind the Mask"	2018	None	Aggressive	The video features masked dancers in a nightclub paying homage to Jackson. The video originally leaked in 2013 but wasn't officially uploaded to Jackson's YouTube channel and other official music video platforms until August 2018.	

=== 2020s ===
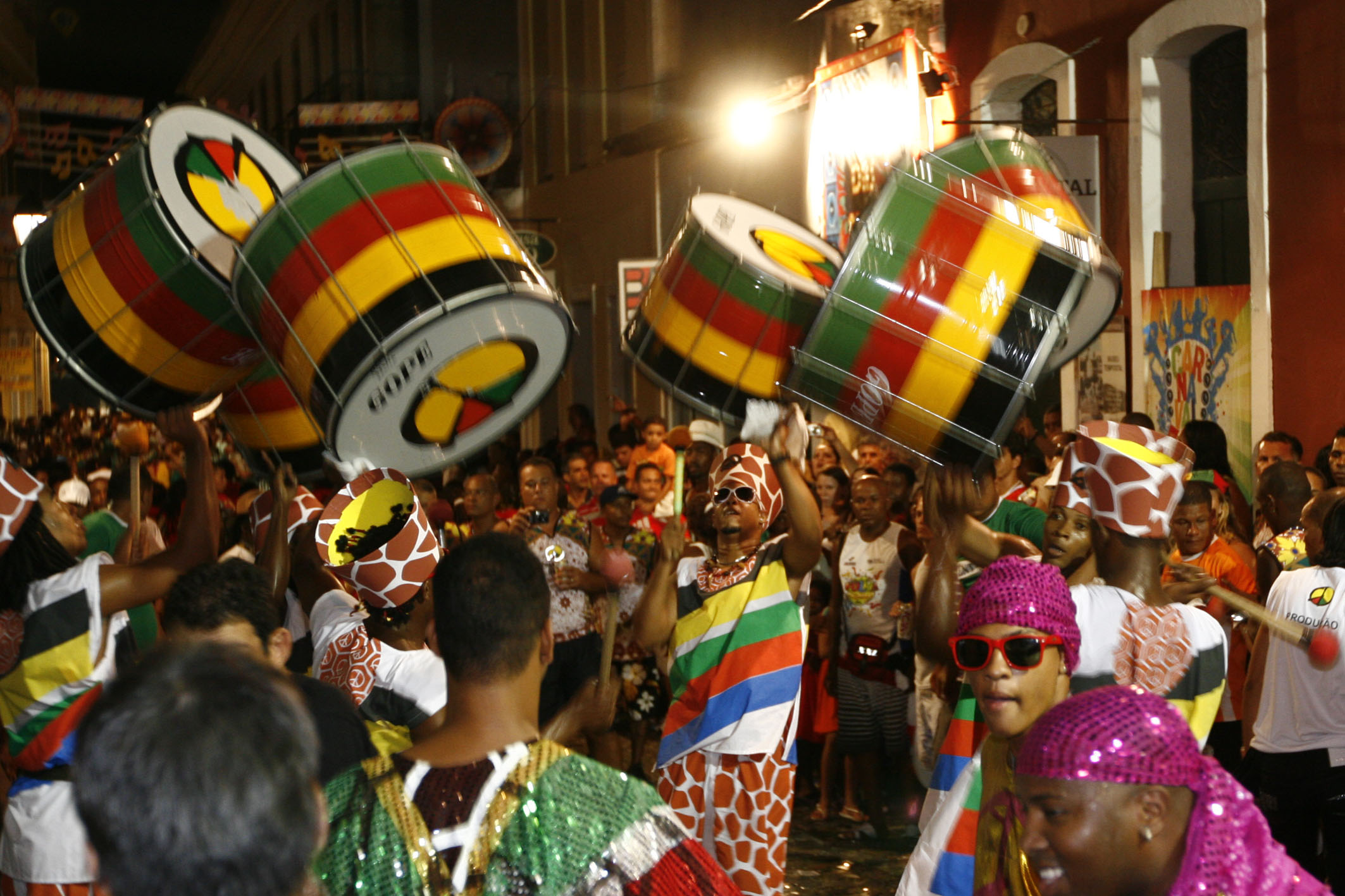
The cultural music group Olodum from Brazil are featured with Jackson in the 2020 music video for "They Don't Care About Us".

List of music videos during the 2020s
Title	Year	Other performer(s) credited	Director(s)	Description	Ref(s)
"Ease On down the Road"	2020	Diana Ross	Sidney Lumet	Despite its initial 1978 release, Universal Pictures released the first performance of the song on The Wiz as a music video to YouTube in March 2020. Diana Ross as Dorothy and Jackson as the Scarecrow sing the song as they make their way down the Yellow Brick Road to meet the "Wiz".	
"Heal the World" (2020 version)	2020	None	Unknown	The music video features clips of Jackson's live performance of the song during the Dangerous World Tour integrated with imagery from the global response to the COVID-19 pandemic as a message of encouragement and comfort.	
"We Are the World" (35th Anniversary version)	2020	USA for Africa	Tom Trbovich	The video shows Jackson with the members of USA for Africa recording the single in 1985 with interspersed scenes of live performances of the song. Lionel Richie, the song's co-writer with Jackson, released this version to communicate a message of global solidarity during the COVID-19 pandemic and to raise funds for aid efforts.	
"They Don't Care About Us" (2020 version)	2020	None	Spike Lee	Director Spike Lee put together a third music video for the song that incorporates pieces of both the previous Brazil and Prison videos, as well as footage from various Black Lives Matter protests occurring around the world in 2020.	

== Video albums ==
List of video albums
Title	Album details	Description	Ref(s)
Moonwalker	Released: January 10, 1989; Label: Capital Home Video; Format: VHS, DVD, and Blu-ray	Contains a collection of short films about Jackson, several of which are long-form music videos from Jackson's Bad album	
Dangerous: The Short Films	Released: November 12, 1993; Label: Legacy, Epic; Format: VHS and DVD	Contains the music videos for Jackson's eighth studio album, Dangerous	
Video Greatest Hits – HIStory	Released: June 9, 1995; Label: Legacy, Epic; Format: VHS and DVD	Contains the music videos for the greatest hits first disc of Jackson's double album HIStory: Past, Present and Future, Book I	
HIStory on Film, Volume II	Released: May 20, 1997; Label: Epic, SME; Format: VHS and DVD	Contains the music videos for HIStory: Past, Present and Future, Book I and Jackson's remix album Blood on the Dance Floor: HIStory in the Mix, as well as content featured in Jackson's previous video collection	
Live in Seoul 마이클 잭슨 내한공연	Released: 1997; Format: VHS	The Seoul dates of the HIStory World Tour were professionally filmed by Nocturne Productions and released as a proshot exclusively in South Korea	
Number Ones	Released: November 18, 2003; Label: Legacy, Epic; Format: DVD	Contains a collection of music videos, mostly from Jackson's studio albums.	
The One	Released: March 9, 2004; Label: Epic; Format: DVD	Contains interviews with other celebrities about Jackson's influence, and footage from Jackson's previous music videos	
Live in Bucharest: The Dangerous Tour	Released: July 26, 2005; Label: Legacy; Format: DVD	Contains the Dangerous World Tour concert show special as it originally aired on HBO in October 1992	
Michael Jackson's Vision	Release date: November 22, 2010; Label: Legacy; Format: DVD	Contains forty-two music videos with newly restored color and remastered audio	
Live at Wembley July 16, 1988	Release date: September 18, 2012; Label: Legacy; Format: DVD	Contains concert performances of the Bad World Tour, with Jackson mostly performing songs from the album Bad on the date and venue listed on the video album title	

== Films and television ==
List of films
Title	Year	Role	Director	Notes	Ref(s)
Diana!	1971	Himself	Kip Walton	Television special	
Goin' Back to Indiana	1971	Himself	Kip Walton	Television special	
Jackson 5ive	1971	Himself		Animated television series	
Save the Children	1973	Himself	Stan Lathan	Concert film	
Bob Hope Special	1973	Himself		Television special	
One More Time	1974	Himself	Marty Pasetta	Television special	
Sandy in Disneyland	1974	Himself	Marty Pasetta	Television special	
Free to Be... You and Me	1974	Himself	Bill Davis	Television special	
The Jacksons in Concert	1975	Himself		Concert film	
The Jacksons	1976-1977	Himself		Television series	
The Wiz	1978	Scarecrow	Sidney Lumet	Musical adventure film	
Wiz on Down the Road	1978	Himself		Making of featurette	
Rock n Roll Sports Classic	1978	Himself		Television special	
A Special Sesame Street Christmas	1978	Himself		Television special	
Disco in the Snow	1979	Himself		Television special	
Christmas Snowtime Special	1979	Himself	Russ Petranto	Television special	
Disneyland 25th Anniversary Show	1980	Himself	Dwight Hemion	Television special	
The Wolfman Jack Radio Show	1980	Himself	Russ Petranto	Television special	
Diana	1981	Himself	Steve Binder	Television special	
Making of Michael Jackson's Thriller	1983	Himself	John Landis	Making of featurette	
Motown 25: Yesterday, Today, Forever	1983	Himself	Don Mischer	Television special	
Victory Tour Toronto	1984	Himself		Concert film	
We Are the World: The Story Behind the Song	1985	Himself	Tom Trbovich	Making of featurette	
Captain EO	1986	Captain EO	Francis Ford Coppola	Short film	
The Making of Captain Eo	1986	Captain EO	Muffett Kaufman	Making of featurette	
Citizen Steve	1987	Himself	Fax Bahr	Short film	
Michael Jackson: The Magic Returns	1987	Himself	Don Wilson	Premier of "Bad"	
Moonwalker	1988	Himself	Jerry Kramer	Anthology film	
Michael Jackson: From Motown to Your Town	1988	Himself	Peter Gaffney	Documentary short on the Bad tour	
Michael Jackson: The Legend Continues	1988	Himself	Patrick T. Kelly	Documentary	
Listen Up: The Lives of Quincy Jones	1990	Himself	Ellen Weissbrod	Documentary	
Sammy Davis, Jr. 60th Anniversary Celebration	1990	Himself	Jeff Margolis	Television special	
MTV's 10th Anniversary Special	1991	Himself		Television special	
The 52nd Presidential Inaugural Gala	1993	Himself	Dwight Hemion	Pre-inaugural gala	
Super Bowl XXVII Halftime Show	1993	Himself	Don Mischer	Halftime show	
Michael Jackson Talks ... to Oprah	1993	Himself	Roger Goodman	Documentary	
Live in Mexico: The Dangerous Tour	1993	Himself	Flor Siqueiros	Concert film	
The Jackson Family Honors	1994	Himself		Television special	
HIStory Teaser	1995	Himself		Teaser	
Michael Jackson's Scream: HIStory in the Making - An MTV News Special	1995	Himself		Making of featurette	
We Are the World: A 10th Anniversary Tribute	1995	Himself		Television special	
HIStory Live	1997	Himself	Paul Becher	Concert film	
Happy Birthday Elizabeth: A Celebration of Life	1997	Himself	Jeff Margolis	Television special	
Michael Jackson and Friends: A Concert for Kosovo's Children	1999	Himself	Alexander Arnz	Concert film	
Michael Jackson: 30th Anniversary Celebration	2001	Himself	Bruce Gowers	Concert film	
United We Stand: What More Can I Give	2001	Himself		Concert film	
Michael Jackson: Live at the Apollo 2002	2002	Himself	David Stern	Concert film	
Men in Black II	2002	Agent M	Barry Sonnenfeld	Cameo appearance	
The Making of Ghosts	2002	Himself		Making of featurette	
Living with Michael Jackson	2003	Himself	Julie Shaw	Documentary	
The Michael Jackson Interview: The Footage You Were Never Meant To See	2003	Himself	Brad Lachman	Documentary	
Michael Jackson's Private Home Movies	2003	Himself	Brad Lachman	Documentary	
Miss Cast Away and the Island Girls	2004	Agent M.J.	Bryan Michael Stoller	Cameo appearance	
Michael Jackson's This Is It	2009	Himself	Kenny Ortega	Documentary	
Michael Jackson: The Life of an Icon	2011	Himself	Andrew Eastel	Documentary	
Bad 25	2012	Himself	Spike Lee	Documentary	
Michael Jackson: The Last Photo Shoots	2014	Himself	Craig Williams	Documentary	
Michael Jackson's Journey from Motown to Off the Wall	2016	Himself	Spike Lee	Documentary	
Thriller 40	2023	Himself	Nelson George	Documentary	
The Greatest Night in Pop	2024	Himself	Bao Nguyen	Documentary	

== Television episodes ==
Television episodes
Year	Title	Notes
1969	The Ed Sullivan Show	Dec 14, 1969, May 10, 1970
1969	The Hollywood Palace	Oct 18, 1969
1970	Top of the Pops	Mar 5, 1970, May 21, 1970, Aug 6, 1970, Nov 9, 1972, Nov 16, 1972, Nov 30, 1972, Sep 13, 1973, May 19, 1977, Feb 8, 1979
1970	The Andy Williams Show	Jan 31, 1970
1970	American Bandstand	Feb 21, 1970, Jul 1, 1972, Jun 28, 1975, Feb 10, 1979
1970	The Jim Nabors Hour	Sep 17, 1970
1971	Flip	Nov 4, 1971, Oct 26, 1972
1972	The ABC Comedy Hour	Mar 1, 1972
1972	The Royal Variety Performance	Nov 5, 1972
1972	The Dating Game	Jun 5, 1972
1972	Top á	Dec 31, 1972
1972	Soul Train	Oct 7, 1972, Nov 3, 1973
1972	Sonny and Cher Comedy Hour	Sep 15, 1972, Jan 30, 1974, Feb 6, 1974
1974	The Jerry Lewis MDA Labor Day Telethon	Sep 1, 1974, Sep 3, 1984
1974	The Tonight Show Starring Johnny Carson	9 April 1974, Aug 19, 1974, Nov 19, 1974, June 21, 1976, Jan 24, 1977
1974	Sonny Comedy Revue	Sep 22, 1974
1974	The Merv Griffin Show	Feb 15, 1974, Apr 10, 1974, Aug 27, 1974
1974	The Mike Douglas Show	Apr 3, 1974, Nov 12, 1975, Feb 8, 1977
1974	The Carol Burnett Show	Mar 16, 1974, Jan 25, 1975, Jan 24, 1976
1975	Cher	Mar 16, 1975
1975	Dinah!	Jul 7, 1975, Jun 16, 1976, Nov 12, 1976
1976	The Sonny and Cher Show	Oct 10, 1976
1976	The Rich Little Show	Feb 16, 1976
1976	Sammy and Company	Apr 24, 1976
1977	Les rendez-vous du dimanche	Nov 20, 1977
1977	Súper Sábado Sensacional	26 February 1977
1977	Numéro un	Jul 2, 1977
1978	Get It Together	Nov 21, 1978
1979	Aplauso	Feb 3, 1979
1979	20/20	Dec 27, 1979, Sep 7, 1997
1979	Multi-Coloured Swap Shop	Feb 10, 1979
1979	Good Morning America	April 26, 1979, Jun 9, 1988,
1980	The Midnight Special	Apr 26, 1980
1983	America's Top 10	Apr 25, 1983, June 9, 1989
1983	Cadence 3	Sep 14, 1983
1983	Entertainment Tonight	Feb 28, 1983
1983	Ebony/Jet Showcase	Apr 17, 1983, Nov 13, 1987
1984	Video Beat	Dec 7, 1984, Jul 27, 1985
1984	Les enfants du rock	Jan 7, 1984, Mar 30, 1985
1984	Schüler-Express	Dec 11, 1984, Dec 12, 1984
1985	Channel Seven Perth Telethon	
1985	Formule 1	Mar 8, 1985
1987	60 Minutes Australia	
1987	Panique sur le 16	Sep 29, 1987
1988	Elle	Oct 12, 1988
1989	The Arsenio Hall Show	Nov 16, 1989
1992	MTV Rockumentary	Feb 2, 1992; contains making of footage of "Remember the Time"
1992	Maury	May 4, 1992; includes poem dedicated to Ryan White and taped message to another fan
1995	Primetime	Jun 14, 1995; interview with Lisa Marie Presley
1995	Wetten, dass..?	Nov 4, 1995, Mar 20, 1999
2001	Total Request Live	Nov. 7, 2001
2003	60 Minutes	Dec 28, 2003
2005	At Large with Geraldo Rivera	January 19, 2005

=== "Stark Raving Dad" ===
"Stark Raving Dad" (1991) was the first episode in the third season of The Simpsons. Jackson performed the speaking voice of Leon Kompowsky using the pseudonym John Jay Smith. The producers of the show were legally prevented from confirming that Jackson guest-starred, although many media sources assumed it was him. The episode was written specifically for Jackson, a fan of the show, who had called Matt Groening, the show's creator one night and offered to do a guest spot. The offer was accepted and Al Jean and Mike Reiss wrote a script based on an idea pitched by James L. Brooks. Groening and co-executive producer Sam Simon also contributed significantly to the writing of the episode.
