= Michael Jackson's Vision =

Video by Michael Jackson
- Released: November 22, 2010
- Recorded: 1976–2003
- Genres: Pop; soul; contemporary R&B; rock; new jack swing; hip hop
- Length: 4:33:10
- Labels: Epic; Legacy; MJJ
- Director: Various
- Producers: Michael Jackson; various

Michael Jackson chronology
Live in Bucharest: The Dangerous Tour (2005)	Michael Jackson's Vision (2010)	Live at Wembley July 16, 1988 (2012)

Michael Jackson's Vision is a DVD video album by American recording artist Michael Jackson. It was released on November 22, 2010, by Epic Records, Legacy Recordings, and Jackson's own label, MJJ Productions. It includes three DVDs, featuring 4.5 hours of content of 42 music videos with newly restored color and remastered audio. This is the first time that all of Jackson's videos have been released on DVD.

== Contents ==
Disc one features videos from the albums Off the Wall, Thriller and Bad and disc two features videos from the albums Dangerous, HIStory: Past, Present and Future, Book I, Blood on the Dance Floor: HIStory in the Mix and Invincible. The third disc, which is a bonus disc, features seven videos. Michael Jackson's Vision includes the full-length versions of the John Landis-directed "Thriller" and "Black or White" as well as the classic "Bad" directed by Academy Award-winning filmmaker Martin Scorsese. Also included in the boxed set are Jackson's collaborations with other noted film directors such as John Singleton, Spike Lee and David Fincher as well as "Ghosts", his rarely seen collaboration with special effects legend Stan Winston. Michael Jackson's Vision is available in a limited edition boxed set featuring a 60-page glossy hard-bound book that includes behind-the-scenes photos from Jackson's videos, which includes information for each video including: songwriter, album, director, production date, location and photography.

Ten music videos previously unavailable on DVD including "One More Chance" are included. It was also released on the iTunes Store and has iTunes LP features. The videos "Smooth Criminal", "Speed Demon", "Come Together", and "Leave Me Alone" come from Jackson's 1988 film Moonwalker. The "Smooth Criminal" segment is actually over 40 minutes long but only the 10-minute song and dance scene is featured. The video "Another Part of Me" is from Jackson's Bad World Tour and "Will You Be There" is from the Dangerous World Tour.

=== Notable omissions and replacements ===
The "HIStory" video and the complete version of "Ghosts" are the only short films not included in this set. The original music video of "Blood on the Dance Floor" is replaced with the Refugee Camp mix. The videos for the Jacksons' songs "Torture" and "Body" are also not included, because Michael did not appear in any of them, despite having a verse in each of them. Also not included is the music video for the Jacksons' "2300 Jackson Street".

== Intros ==
Michael Jackson's Vision is the second DVD release by Jackson to feature animation intros to all of the videos (the other being HIStory on Film, Volume II). For discs one and two, before each video begins, a short introduction, which features a short animated clip of the video, is shown revealing the title. The bonus disc just reveals the title and no clip is shown.

== Track listing ==
Disc one
No.	Title	Director(s)	Length
1.	"Don't Stop 'Til You Get Enough"	Nick Saxton	4:12
2.	"Rock with You"	Bruce Gowers	3:22
3.	"She's Out of My Life"	Gowers	3:35
4.	"Billie Jean"	Steve Barron	4:54
5.	"Beat It"	Bob Giraldi	4:57
6.	"Thriller"	John Landis	13:42
7.	"Bad"	Martin Scorsese	18:05
8.	"The Way You Make Me Feel"	Joe Pytka	9:24
9.	"Man in the Mirror"	Donald Wilson	5:03
10.	"Dirty Diana"	Pytka	5:05
11.	"Smooth Criminal"	Colin Chilvers	9:27
12.	"Another Part of Me"	Patrick T. Kelly	4:45
13.	"Speed Demon"	Will Vinton	10:08
14.	"Come Together"	Jerry Kramer; Chilvers	5:40
15.	"Leave Me Alone"	Jim Blashfield; Paul Diener	4:36
16.	"Liberian Girl"	Jim Yukich	5:34
Total length:			112:29

Disc two
No.	Title	Director(s)	Length
1.	"Black or White"	Landis	11:01
2.	"Remember the Time"	John Singleton	9:16
3.	"In the Closet"	Herb Ritts	6:05
4.	"Jam"	David Kellogg	7:59
5.	"Heal the World"	Pytka	7:32
6.	"Give In to Me"	Andy Morahan	5:29
7.	"Who Is It"	David Fincher	6:34
8.	"Will You Be There"	Vincent Paterson	5:55
9.	"Gone Too Soon"	Bill DiCicco	3:38
10.	"Scream" (with Janet Jackson)	Mark Romanek	4:47
11.	"Childhood"	Nicholas Brandt	4:29
12.	"You Are Not Alone"	Wayne Isham	5:34
13.	"Earth Song"	Brandt	6:44
14.	"They Don't Care About Us" (Brazil version)	Spike Lee	7:08
15.	"Stranger in Moscow"	Brandt	5:33
16.	"Blood on the Dance Floor" (Refugee Camp mix)	Michael Jackson; Paterson	5:27
17.	"Ghosts"	Stan Winston	3:58
18.	"You Rock My World"	Paul Hunter	13:30
19.	"Cry"	Brandt	4:57
Total length:			125:36

Disc three
No.	Title	Director(s)	Length
1.	"Blame It on the Boogie" (The Jacksons)		3:32
2.	"Enjoy Yourself" (The Jacksons)		3:31
3.	"Can You Feel It" (The Jacksons)	Gowers; Robert Abel	9:37
4.	"Say Say Say" (with Paul McCartney)	Giraldi	4:57
5.	"They Don't Care About Us" (prison version)	Lee	4:52
6.	"Why?" (3T featuring Michael Jackson)		4:33
7.	"One More Chance"	Brandt	4:03
Total length:			35:05

== Alterations ==
Some music videos have been changed and are different from their previous commercial releases.

- "Bad" – the full 18-minute version with the ending credits included.
- "Smooth Criminal" – this is the 9-minute version as shown on HIStory on Film, Volume II, which in turn was based on the "dance sequence" from the "Smooth Criminal" segment of Moonwalker.
- "Black or White" – the original version without the racist graffiti added on to the car windows and shop door is featured but it does not include the "prejudice is ignorance" title card.
- "Heal the World" – has an added intro that can be seen on Dangerous: The Short Films.
- "Who Is It" – has some parts of the instrumental rearranged compared to its previous release.
- "Will You Be There" – the video is not the one on Michael Jackson's YouTube page. It is an alternate version of the one on Dangerous: The Short Films; a few seconds of the audio at the beginning is missing, and the ending is different from the one previously released, as there is no angel flying down to Jackson; instead, he sings on his own, and slow motion shots of the audience are shown.
- "Gone Too Soon" – is the version found on Michael Jackson's YouTube page and not the one previously released as seen on Dangerous: The Short Films.
- "You Are Not Alone" – is the version without Jackson naked with angel wings on his back.
- "Earth Song" – most of the sound effects are muted and the ending message is not shown.
- "Blood on the Dance Floor" – the original version of the music video is replaced with the Refugee Camp mix, as shown on HIStory on Film, Volume II.
- "Ghosts" – is the trimmed-down 3½-minute long edit of the movie of the same name.
- "You Rock My World" – full 13-minute version is featured along with original credits.
- "Can You Feel It" – includes the ending credits.
- "They Don't Care About Us (Prison Version)" – has a disclaimer at the beginning, plus different scenes than those of the first broadcast on TV.

== Reception ==
On February 15, 2011, Michael Jackson's Vision was certified 5× Platinum by RIAA for sales of over 500,000 units in the United States. On December 31, 2010, it was also certified Diamond in France (for sales of over 60,000 units) and 2× Platinum in Australia. On May 29, 2011, it was also certified Gold in New Zealand. It has been also certified Gold in Austria and Platinum in Poland.

=== Response ===
Reception over the video and audio quality of the box set has been mixed. As the videos are played in 16:9, videos with a 4:3 aspect ratio are pillarboxed and as a result, the resolution is lower than some previous DVDs. Also, the audio is mixed in PCM stereo instead of 5.1 Surround as on many previous DVDs.

== Charts ==
Chart (2010)	Peak position
Australian DVD Chart	2
Austrian DVD Chart	1
Belgian Flanders DVD Chart	3
Belgian Wallonia DVD Chart	2
Dutch DVD Chart	3
Finnish DVD Chart	3
French DVD Chart	1
Italian DVD Chart	1
Japanese DVD Chart	1
Spanish DVD Chart	1
Swiss DVD Chart	1
UK DVD Chart	2
US Billboard DVD Chart	2

== Certifications ==
Region	Certification	Certified units/sales
Australia (ARIA)	2× Platinum	30,000^{^}
Austria (IFPI Austria)	Gold	5,000^{*}
France (SNEP)	Diamond	60,000^{*}
New Zealand (RMNZ)	Gold	2,500^{^}
Poland (ZPAV)	Platinum	10,000^{*}
Spain (Promusicae)	Gold	10,000^{^}
United Kingdom (BPI)	Gold	25,000^{^}
United States (RIAA)	5× Platinum	500,000^{^}
^{*} Sales figures based on certification alone.^{^} Shipments figures based on certification alone.
