= Speed Demon (Michael Jackson song) =

1989 song by Michael Jackson

Promotional single by Michael Jackson

from the album Bad
- B-side: "Speed Demon" (single edit)
- Released: September 4, 1989 (EU)
- Recorded: 1987
- Studio: Westlake (studio D), Los Angeles
- Genre: Funk rock; synth-funk
- Length: 4:01: 3:59 (single edit)
- Label: Epic; CBS
- Songwriter: Michael Jackson
- Producers: Quincy Jones; Michael Jackson (co.)

Music video
- "Speed Demon" on YouTube

"Speed Demon" is a song by American singer and recording artist Michael Jackson from his seventh studio album, Bad. It was written, composed and co-produced by Jackson, and produced by Quincy Jones. "Speed Demon" is a funk rock and synth-funk song whose lyrics pertain to driving fast. The song segues into the fourth track of Bad, "Liberian Girl". A promotional single was released on September 4, 1989, as part of the campaign around the 1988 film Moonwalker. The song received mixed reviews from contemporary critics.

== Background ==
"Speed Demon" was written and co-produced by Michael Jackson, and produced by Quincy Jones. It appears on Jackson's album, Bad. Reportedly the song was originally planned to be released as an official single, but it was instead released as a promotional single. A 7" single was produced to promote the single release of "Speed Demon", as the song had become popular because of its use in the Moonwalker movie (as with "Leave Me Alone"), but the single release of "Speed Demon" was subsequently cancelled. The song's lyrics are about driving fast. According to Jones, Jackson wrote the song after he received a traffic ticket, which caused him to arrive late to the recording studio. Jones told him to write about how he felt, which he did, thereby turning it into a song. Although "Speed Demon" was part of Jackson's Bad album, Jackson did not perform the song during his Bad World Tour, nor any of his other tours. The song was remixed by dubstep group Nero for the 25th anniversary of Bad.

== Critical reception ==
"Speed Demon" received mixed reviews from contemporary critics. Davitt Sigerson of Rolling Stone stated that the "filler" content in Bad—including songs such as "Speed Demon", "Dirty Diana" and "Liberian Girl"—made Bad "richer, sexier, and better than Thriller's forgettables". Sigerson described "Speed Demon" as being "the car song"..."a fun little power tale in which Jackson's superego gives his id a ticket". On the other hand, Stephen Thomas Erlewine of AllMusic commented that the "near-fatal dead spot[s] on the record" of "Speed Demon" and "Another Part of Me" represented "a sequence that's utterly faceless, lacking memorable hooks and melodies".

Richard Cromelin of the Los Angeles Times gave Bad a good review. He remarked that the song "Speed Demon" would "zero" audiophiles on the "race car intro-dimensional recording". Eric Snider of the St. Petersburg Times described "Speed Demon" as "churning along relentlessly". Jay Cocks of Time noted that Jackson did great "vocal stunts" on Bad's tracks; such as "Speed Demon" and "Dirty Diana" and described the two songs as "nimble and fanciful as any of his dance steps". In his Bad 25 review, BBC Music's Mike Diver wrote that "Speed Demon" was "fun funk-rock that'd sit happily on a Prince album of the period, compositionally if not lyrically."

== Music video ==
Jackson filmed a promotional video for the song in March 1988 at Warner Bros. Studios, Burbank. It is seen first as a segment in the anthology film Moonwalker (1988). Directed by Will Vinton(animated characters) and Jerry Kramer (live action footages), the video was produced by Vinton, Kramer, Dennis E. Jones, David Altschul, Jackson and Frank DiLeo.

As the video begins, Jackson tries to evade overzealous fans and interviewers (including the Noid from Domino's Pizza commercials), disguising himself as a rabbit named Spike. However, as his alter ego, he goads the fans into chasing him. During the chase, he morphs into other celebrities, including Sylvester Stallone, Tina Turner and Pee-wee Herman. After finally losing the mob, he removes the costume, which comes to life and challenges him to a dance-off. As the two finish dancing, a police officer (portrayed by Clancy Brown) approaches and indicates a "No Dancing" sign. Jackson tries to explain the situation, but Spike has vanished. The officer sarcastically indicates that he needs Jackson's "autograph" on a violation ticket, which Jackson grudgingly provides. The officer departs and, as Jackson prepares to do the same, a rocky crag in the distance morphs into Spike's head; Jackson and the rock formation smile at each other.

In his review of Moonwalker, Dennis Hunt of The Los Angeles Times commented that the video (along with those for "Bad" and "Leave Me Alone") was "slick, well-crafted and expensive-looking." He nevertheless felt that the segments were collectively "still just music videos", further stating that they were "not even strung together in any particularly imaginative fashion". In 2010, the long version of the music video was released in the box set Michael Jackson's Vision and again in 2012 in the Target exclusive version DVD of Bad 25, along with eight other music videos, from the Bad era.

== Credits and personnel ==
Credits adapted from the liner notes of Bad.

- Written and composed by Michael Jackson
- Produced by Quincy Jones
- Co-produced by Michael Jackson
- Michael Jackson: solo and background vocals, vocal synthesizer
- Larry Williams: Midi saxophone solo
- Miko Brando, Ollie E. Brown, John Robinson: drums
- Douglas Getschal: drum programming
- Bill Bottrell, David Williams: guitars
- Kim Hutchcroft: saxophone
- Gary Grant, Jerry Hey: trumpets
- Paulinho da Costa: percussion
- Christopher Currell: Synclavier, effects
- John Barnes, Michael Boddicker, Greg Phillinganes: synthesizers
- Eric Persing: synthesizer programming
- Race car intro:
  - Dimensional recording by Spherical Sound, Inc.
  - Sounds engineered by Ken Caillat and Tom Jones
- Rhythm arrangement by Michael Jackson and Quincy Jones
- Vocal arrangements by Michael Jackson
- Synthesizer and horn arrangements by Jerry Hey
