= Moonwalker =

1988 film starring Michael Jackson

- Theatrical release poster by Bill Gold
- Directed by: Jerry Kramer; "Smooth Criminal": Colin Chilvers; "Leave Me Alone": Jim Blashfield
- Screenplay by: "Smooth Criminal": David Newman
- Story by: "Smooth Criminal": Michael Jackson
- Produced by: Dennis E. Jones; Jerry Kramer; Frank DiLeo; Michael Jackson; "Speed Demon": Will Vinton; "Leave Me Alone": Jim Blashfield; Paul Diener
- Starring: Michael Jackson; Sean Lennon; Kellie Parker; Brandon Quintin Adams; Joe Pesci
- Cinematography: John Hora; Thomas E. Ackerman; Robert E. Collins; Frederick Elmes; Crescenzo G.P. Notarile
- Edited by: Dale Beldin; David E. Blewitt; Mitchell Sinoway
- Music by: Bruce Broughton (score); Michael Jackson (songs)
- Production companies: Lorimar Motion Pictures; MJJ Productions; Ultimate Productions; Will Vinton Productions ("Speed Demon")
- Distributed by: Warner Bros.
- Release date: October 29, 1988
- Running time: 93 minutes
- Country: United States
- Language: English
- Budget: $22 million
- Box office: $67 million

Moonwalker is a 1988 American anthology musical film starring Michael Jackson. Rather than featuring one continuous narrative, the film explores the influence of fandom and innocence through a collection of short films about Jackson, several of which are long-form music videos from Jackson's 1987 album Bad. The film is named after the dance technique known as the moonwalk, which Jackson was known for performing.

== Summary ==
The film's segments are connected by an underlying but overall narrative meant to represent the different stages in Jackson's career and were based on his own view of how his fans idolized him rather than listening to the messages he wanted to say with his music.

=== "Man in the Mirror" ===
The first segment of Moonwalker is a live performance of "Man in the Mirror" during Jackson's Bad World Tour in Europe and America. Clips from Met Center in Minneapolis among others can be seen. It also features a montage of clips of children in Africa, Martin Luther King Jr., Mother Teresa, Mahatma Gandhi, Desmond Tutu, Jesus Christ, kids in graduation, and other historical figures.

=== "Retrospective" ===
The second segment is a 10-minute biographical film about Jackson, covering the early years from the Jackson 5 until the Bad World Tour.

The songs in order of appearance are:

1. "Music and Me"
2. "I Want You Back"
3. "ABC"
4. "The Love You Save"
5. "2-4-6-8"
6. "Who's Lovin' You"
7. "Ben"
8. "Dancing Machine"
9. "Blame It on the Boogie"
10. "Shake Your Body (Down to the Ground)"
11. "Rock with You"
12. "Don't Stop 'Til You Get Enough"
13. "Can You Feel It"
14. "Human Nature"
15. "Beat It"
16. "Thriller"
17. "Billie Jean"
18. "State of Shock"
19. "We Are the World"
20. "The Way You Make Me Feel"
21. "Dirty Diana"

=== "Badder" ===
The third segment is a parody of the music video for Bad's title song, featuring children filling the roles of various people from the original clip. The video stars Brandon Quintin Adams (who also appears in the "Smooth Criminal" segment) as the young Jackson. It also features three of Jackson's nephews (TJ Jackson, Taryll Jackson, and Jermaine Jackson Jr.), and a young Nikki Cox. The singing group the Boys appeared as background dancers. Ingrid Dupree of the Kidsongs kids also appears in this segment.

=== "Speed Demon" ===
The fourth segment begins with the "Badder" short film transitioning into the second short film, "Speed Demon", produced by Claymation innovator Will Vinton. A portion of the clip is set to Jackson's song "Speed Demon". After filming "Badder", young Jackson and his bodyguards (also young kids) are leaving the set and walk through a cloud of smoke and come out as their regular adult-age selves. As he exits the set, he is spotted by tourists, who suddenly begin to chase him for an autograph. In an attempt to avoid the overzealous fans and the interviewers (including camera-happy Japanese tourists accompanied by stereotyped "Oriental" music, the press, and even the Noid) plus some gunslingers (after stumbling upon the filming of a Western helmed by a director resembling Steven Spielberg), Jackson soon disguises himself as a rabbit named Spike, using a costume from one of the film sets (imbued with animatronic properties using Claymation, giving a similar combined-media effect as Who Framed Roger Rabbit, but with more obvious bluescreening).

Jackson taunts the fans into chasing him, once they realize it is him. Jackson steals a bicycle which then turns into a motorcycle once he hits the highway in order to flee, with the fans and the paparazzi (now also appearing in Claymation form) giving chase in various other, more cartoonish vehicles. During the chase, he morphs into other celebrities, namely Sylvester Stallone, Tina Turner and Pee-wee Herman, with the bike also briefly morphing (into a jackhammer, stop sign, waterski, and jet pack) in repeatedly unsuccessful attempts to throw the fans off.

After a long chase, the fans/press are finally thwarted by crashing into a giant (Claymation) cop and are arrested. Jackson finally then manages to escape and rides off to a desert. He takes off his rabbit costume and it then suddenly comes to life and challenges him to an extended dance-off. In the end, a passing traffic cop interrupts Jackson to point out he is in a "No Dancing Zone", and when Jackson turns to show him that he was competing with the rabbit, he sees that the rabbit has disappeared. The cop then sarcastically asks for Jackson's autograph (as opposed to "signature") on the ticket. Just as Jackson is preparing to leave, the rabbit's head materializes on a nearby rocky crag, which then nods to him and smiles.

=== "Leave Me Alone" ===
The fifth segment of the film is a surreal animated music video for the song "Leave Me Alone", focusing on supermarket tabloid interest in Jackson's personal life. Drawing inspiration from Gulliver's Travels, it compares Jackson's life to an amusement park, and how his fans just see him as such. The segment is meant to point out, in a mocking tone, the way the tabloids unnecessarily sensationalized his life with claims that he had a shrine to Elizabeth Taylor and bought the Elephant Man's bones. In the video, Jackson's life is portrayed as a circus due to the press's manipulation and the everyday tug-of-war he endured as an artist. His beloved then-pet chimp Bubbles makes a cameo appearance as Jackson is seen picking him up and riding with him in his roller coaster car. His pet snake, Muscles, is also present. The press is portrayed with dog heads to insinuate that they are like animals. The segment ends with a giant Jackson destroying the park, and looking off into space.

=== "Smooth Criminal" ===
The segment begins with three orphans (Sean, Katie, and Zeke) sneaking through a big city to see their friend Michael going out for the evening. As Jackson stands in front of the door, he notices a falling star before he is ambushed by men with machine guns. The film then backtracks to show Jackson and the children playing in a meadow in happier times.

As they are playing, their dog Skipper runs away, and as Jackson and Katie look for him, they uncover the lair of Frankie Lideo (a.k.a. Mr. Big) (a play on Jackson's real-life manager Frank DiLeo (1947-2011)), a drug-dealing mobster with an army of henchmen. Leading an operation called "Bugs and Drugs," he wants to get the entire population of Earth addicted to drugs, starting with children. As Mr. Big continues work on his operation, he discovers that Michael and Katie are spying on him.

The story returns to the ambush in front of Jackson's apartment. Unknown to the gangsters, Jackson wished on the falling star and escaped the gunfire, leaving only his overcoat. Upon realizing he has escaped again, Mr. Big orders his henchmen to track down Michael with dogs. He is eventually cornered in an alley, where he wishes on another falling star and turns into a Lancia Stratos Zero sports car that mows down several of Mr. Big's henchmen. Jackson is pursued through the city streets until he loses the henchmen.

Meanwhile, the children scout out Club 30s, where Jackson had told them to meet him, and find only an abandoned nightclub. As Jackson arrives, Katie sees a silhouette of him turning back from a car into himself. The door of the club opens with a gust of wind, and Jackson walks in to find it filled with men in suits and swing dancers. The children gather outside a window of the club and watch Jackson dance to "Smooth Criminal". Mr. Big lays siege to the club and kidnaps Katie.

Jackson follows them back to Big's lair and ends up surrounded by his henchmen. Mr. Big appears and taunts Jackson by threatening to inject Katie with highly addictive narcotics. While Katie manages to wriggle free, Mr. Big decides he has had enough and orders his men to kill Katie first then finish off Jackson, just as a falling star passes by. Jackson transforms into a giant robot and kills most of Mr. Big's soldiers, then turns into a spaceship. Mr. Big gets into a large hillside-mounted energy cannon, firing on the spaceship knocking it into a nearby ravine. The children are his next target, but the spaceship returns from the ravine in time to fire a beam at the cannon with Mr. Big inside, destroying it and finishing the villain once and for all. The children watch the ship fly into the night sky with a shower of light.

=== "Come Together" ===
In the conclusion to "Smooth Criminal", Sean, Katie and Zeke return to the city, believing that Jackson is gone forever. As the boys talk about Jackson, Katie walks away crying and clutching a paper star. As she sits in a corner wishing for him to come back, the paper star flies out of her hand and Jackson walks out of the night fog. He takes them back to Club 30s, where they find that the club has turned into the backstage area of a concert. Jackson's stage crew return the children's missing dog and then escort Jackson onto the stage where he performs a cover of the Beatles song "Come Together" with the children watching and cheering him on from backstage.

=== Closing credits ===
During the closing credits, two more segments are shown. The first has Ladysmith Black Mambazo performing "The Moon is Walking" in Club 30s amidst behind-the-scenes clips. The second is a selection of slowed-down and sped-up clips from the "Smooth Criminal" segment, which was also used as an alternate music video to the song. The Bad album cover appears near the end of the credits.

== Cast ==
- Michael Jackson as himself
- Joe Pesci as Frankie "Mr. Big" Lideo
- Kellie Parker as Katie
- Sean Lennon as Sean
- Brandon Quintin Adams as Zeke / "Smooth Criminal" / "Baby Bad" / Michael "Badder"
- Clancy Brown as Policeman
- Ladysmith Black Mambazo as themselves
- Jermaine La Jaune Jackson Jr. as himself
- TJ Jackson as himself
- Taryll Jackson as himself
- Nikki Cox as herself
- The Boys as themselves
- Pons Maar as the Noid (voice)
- Paul Reubens as Pee-wee Herman (voice)

== Release ==
The release of Moonwalker was originally scheduled to coincide with Jackson's 1987 album Bad. During the theatrical release of Moonwalker, Jackson was also embarking on the Bad World Tour, his first tour as a solo performer. The film was released theatrically in Australia, Europe and South America, but Warner Bros. canceled plans for a Christmas 1988 theatrical release in the United States. Moonwalker was instead released on home video by CMV Enterprises in the United States and Canada on January 10, 1989, just as the Bad World Tour finished. (His tour was supposed to finish sooner, but had been postponed due to some vocal strain, so it went on until the last week of January 1989). The video had sold more than 800,000 copies in the United States by April 17, 1989.

=== Home media ===
The film had a limited theatrical release and was released in the United States on VHS and LaserDisc. The vignettes featured in the movie also appear in a DVD box set of Michael Jackson music videos titled Michael Jackson's Vision. The set only features the song and dance sequences from "Smooth Criminal", the title song, and the ending "Come Together" as opposed to the entire short film. Moonwalker was originally released on VHS, and remained #1 on Billboard's Video Chart for 22 weeks. Moonwalker also spent 14 weeks at #1 on Billboards Top Video- Cassette sales chart The Video Software Dealer's Association awarded Jackson with an award for Moonwalker in 1989. In 1989, Moonwalker was honoured with a certification of 800,000 copies sold by the Recording Industry Association of America (RIAA). Moonwalker has been certified 9 x Platinum in the United Kingdom.

Moonwalker was released on a region-free Blu-ray in the United Kingdom in June 2010 by Warner Bros. This Blu-ray version contained a new remastered transfer and a DTS-HD Master Audio soundtrack. The release has been censored, with the scenes of Mr. Big hitting Katie and threatening to inject her with heroin cut from the film. The Blu-ray was released in its original theatrical 16:9 aspect ratio, different from the previous 4:3 home releases.

In April 2026, Plaion Pictures released a limited edition Blu-ray Mediabook in Germany, which includes the original theatrical cut of the film, restoring the previously censored scenes. This release also features the film in both its 16:9 and 4:3 aspect ratios.

== Reception ==
=== Critical response ===
The film received mixed reviews. Critics praised the music though complained that there was no plot and that it seemed like a series of music videos tied together. Variety reported that Moonwalker "seems unsure of what it was supposed to be. At the center of the pic is the 'Smooth Criminal' segment, a musical/dramatic piece full of dancing, schmaltzy kids, sci-fi effects and blazing machine guns (directed by Academy Award winner Colin Chilvers, based on a story by Jackson). Around it are really just numerous Jackson music videos with little or no linkage. Although quite enjoyable the whole affair does not make for a structured or professional movie."

On the review aggregator website Rotten Tomatoes, 50% of 40 critics' reviews are positive. The website's consensus reads: "A visually extravagant but narratively hollow patchwork, Moonwalker buries Michael Jackson's singular talent beneath a barrage of fantasy, self-mythologizing spectacle, and loosely connected concepts that dazzle more than they cohere."

== Awards ==
The "Leave Me Alone" video aired as a separate entity and won a Grammy in 1990 for Best Music Video, Short Form, which is the only Grammy Award Jackson received for the album Bad. "Leave Me Alone" video also won the Cannes Gold Lion Award for Best Special Effects.

=== Certifications ===
Region	Certification	Certified units/sales
Canada (Music Canada)	4× Platinum	40,000^{^}
United Kingdom (BPI)	9× Platinum	450,000^{*}
United States (RIAA)	8× Platinum	800,000^{^}
^{*} Sales figures based on certification alone.^{^} Shipments figures based on certification alone.

== Other media ==
=== Video games ===
Moonwalker was first adapted in game form to various home computers by British developer U.S. Gold. This top-down action game followed the segments of the film and bore little resemblance to the latter, more popular games developed by Sega with Michael Jackson's cooperation.

Moonwalker was developed into an arcade video game by Sega with the help of Jackson, which was released on the Sega System 18 hardware. A distinct adaptation was also developed for the Genesis/Mega Drive and Master System consoles. The console versions of the game were actually based on an evolved version of the side-scrolling Sega Mega Drive Shinobi series engine, while the arcade version was a three-quarters beat 'em up.

Both the console and arcade versions are based on the "Smooth Criminal" segment of the film, following Michael in suit and fedora through stages based on his different music videos as he rescues children from the drug dealer Mr. Big. In the three-player simultaneous arcade game, contact with Bubbles, Michael's chimp, transformed him into a robot warrior, replacing Michael's "star magic" and melee dance attacks with missiles and laser beams. In the console versions on certain levels, rescuing a certain child first would trigger a comet to fall from the sky that could be grabbed transforming Michael into the robot (which could fly with a rocket pack as well as using lasers and a missile special attack). Michael automatically changes into a robot for the final showdown with Mr. Big's henchmen and finally into a space ship for the last battle, in a sort of flight-sim shooter in the Genesis version. All incarnations of the game featured the ability of Michael to use some form of "Dance Magic" which would force his enemies to dance to the music of various tunes from "Bad" or "Thriller" and be destroyed as a result.

In North America, the game had a successful launch. It was the top-grossing new video game on the RePlay arcade charts in September 1990. The game received a positive review from RePlay magazine.

=== Comic ===
In 1989, Blackthorne Publishing adapted the film into a comic book, Moonwalker 3-D (# 75 in Blackthorne's 3-D Series). This title, illustrated by Abel Laxamana was a major contributing factor in the demise of Blackthorne, since the publisher had to pay a large licensing fee for the property, and when the comic flopped, they experienced a large financial loss. Blackthorne ceased its operations in 1990.

=== Toys ===
In 2014, Bandai released an S.H. Figuarts figure of Jackson in his "Smooth Criminal" outfit.
