= Rock n Roll Sports Classic =

- Directed by: David Caldwell, Terry Finkel, Kac Young
- Narrated by: Alex Karras
- Country of origin: United States
- Original language: English

Production
- Producers: Bob Selzer, Jack Thompson, Gretchen Voeth
- Running time: 2 hour
- Production company: Aucoin Alvin RossBob Finkel Inc.

Original release
- Network: NBC
- Release: May 3, 1991

The Rock 'N Roll Sports Classic was a television special that aired May 3rd 1978 on NBC. Musical stars would compete in athletic events to win money for charity in the vein of similar shows like Battle of the Network Stars or Circus of the Stars.

== Synopsis ==
The event was held March 10–11, 1978, at the University of California, Irvine. The participants were divided into two teams: East wearing blue and West wearing yellow.

The East (blue) team included:

Captain:Phyllis Diller Assistant Captain:Barbi Benton

- Alessi Brothers
- Boston
- Electric Light Orchestra
- Gladys Knight & the Pips
- The Jacksons (including La Toya and Janet for the women's events)
- Anne Murray
- Helen Schneider
- Seals & Crofts
- Sha Na Na

The West (yellow) team included:

Captain:Sandy Duncan Assistant Captain:Susan Anton

- Commodores
- Earth, Wind & Fire
- Freddy Fender
- Lita Ford
- Leif Garrett
- Kenny Loggins
- The Runaways
- Rod Stewart
- Tanya Tucker

Also appearing:

Host

- Alex Karras

Co-host

- Ed McMahon

Reporters

  - Kristy McNichol
  - Michelle Phillips
  - Joe Smith
  - Fred Travalena
- Dallas Cowboys Cheerleaders

== See also ==
- MTV Rock N' Jock
