= Top á =

Top á is a television variety show created and produced by Maritie and Gilbert Carpentier, broadcasting to Francophone countries between 1972 and 1974. In France, the show was broadcast on evenings on ORTF's Second Channel. In some weeks, it attracted more than 15 million viewers and was broadcast in twenty countries worldwide..

Inspired by American variety shows, each episode was dedicated to a specific artist, who would invite guest stars and perform musical, dance and comedy routines. The sketches and songs performed on set were often new material written specifically for the occasion—sometimes by Maritie Carpentier, or by their friends Jean-Jacques Debout or Serge Gainsbourg.
