= Liberian Girl =

Single by Michael Jackson

from the album Bad
- B-side: "Girlfriend" (album version)
- Released: July 3, 1989
- Recorded: 1986–1987
- Studio: Westlake (studio D), Los Angeles
- Genre: R&B
- Length: 3:53 (album version); 3:40 (single version)
- Label: Epic; CBS
- Songwriter: Michael Jackson
- Producers: Quincy Jones; Michael Jackson (co.)

Michael Jackson singles chronology
| "Leave Me Alone" (1989) | "Liberian Girl" (1989) | "Black or White" (1991) |

Music video
- "Liberian Girl" on YouTube

"Liberian Girl" is the ninth and final single released from American singer Michael Jackson's 1987 album Bad. The song was written as early as 1983 and was among those considered for the Jacksons' Victory album. It was reworked and rewritten for Bad. The song was released as a single in Europe, Japan, New Zealand, and Australia. The song was a commercial success, ranking the top 15 in several countries. The song features South African singer Letta Mbulu who can be heard in Swahili saying 'Nakupenda pia, Nakutaka pia, Mpenzi we' (I love you too, I want you too, my love).

== Critical reception ==
The New York Times editor Jon Pareles wrote that a melody line from "Billie Jean" reappears in this song. Rolling Stone's Davitt Sigerson praised the song: "'Liberian Girl' – is Michael's filler, which makes it richer, sexier, better than Thriller's forgettables" and he also described that it "glistens with gratitude for the existence of a loved one." In 2003, Q magazine ranked the song at number 1,001 in their list of the "1001 Best Songs Ever".

== Reaction in Liberia ==
The song received a positive reception in Liberia, with women from the African country viewing the song as empowering. Liberian woman Margaret Carson said in an interview with The Washington Times "when that music came out ... the Liberian girls were so astonished to hear a great musician like Michael Jackson thinking about a little country in Africa. It gave us hope, especially when things went bad ... . It made us to feel that we are still part of the world."

== Music video ==
Directed by Jim Yukich and produced by Paul Flattery for FYI (Flattery Yukich Inc.), the music video for the song was filmed in two days in April 1989 at A&M Chaplin Stage at A&M Studios in Los Angeles, California. The music video featured many of Jackson's celebrity friends who gather on a soundstage to film the music video for "Liberian Girl", only to discover that Jackson was filming them all along. The following people are listed in order of appearance (ordered by columns):

- Beverly Johnson
- Malcolm-Jamal Warner
- Sherman Hemsley
- Mayim Bialik
- Brigitte Nielsen
- Paula Abdul
- Carl Weathers
- Whoopi Goldberg
- Quincy Jones
- Jackie Collins
- Amy Irving
- Jasmine Guy
- Rosanna Arquette
- Billy Dee Williams
- Lou Diamond Phillips
- Olivia Newton-John
- John Travolta
- Corey Feldman
- Steven Spielberg
- Debbie Gibson
- Rick Schroder
- Blair Underwood
- "Weird Al" Yankovic
- Bubbles (Michael's pet)
- Suzanne Somers
- Lou Ferrigno
- Don King and "Son"
- Virginia Madsen
- David Copperfield
- Richard and Emily Dreyfuss
- Danny Glover
- Olivia Hussey
- Dan Aykroyd
- Steve Guttenberg

There was also someone dressed as a mummy in the video. In the ending credits the mummy was credited with a question mark.

The music video of the song was included on the video albums HIStory on Film, Volume II, Vision, and the Target version DVD of Bad 25.

== Track listings ==
7-inch

1. "Liberian Girl" (edit) – 3:40
2. "Girlfriend" – 3:05

12-inch

1. "Liberian Girl" (edit) – 3:40
2. "Get on the Floor" – 4:44
3. "Girlfriend" – 3:05

CD single

1. "Liberian Girl" (edit) – 3:40
2. "Girlfriend" – 3:05
3. "The Lady in My Life" – 5:00
4. "Get on the Floor" – 4:44

CD 3-inch

1. "Liberian Girl" (edit) – 3:40
2. "Get on the Floor" – 4:44
3. "Girlfriend" – 3:05

== Personnel ==
- Michael Jackson – songwriter, co-producer, solo and background vocals, drums, rhythm arrangement, vocal arrangement
- Quincy Jones – producer, rhythm arrangement, synthesizer arrangement
- John Barnes – rhythm arrangement, vocal arrangement, synthesizer arrangement, synthesizers
- Michael Boddicker – synthesizers
- Miko Brando – drums
- Christopher Currell – Synclavier
- Paulinho da Costa – percussion
- Douglas Getschal – drum programming
- Jerry Hey – synthesizer arrangement
- Letta Mbulu – Swahili chant
- David Paich – synthesizers
- Steve Porcaro – synthesizer programming
- John Robinson – drums
- Caiphus Semenya – Swahili chant arrangement
- Larry Williams – synthesizers

== Charts ==
Initial chart performance for "Liberian Girl"
| Chart (1989) | Peak position |
|---|---|
| Australia (ARIA) | 50 |
| Belgium (Ultratop 50 Flanders) | 12 |
| Europe (Eurochart Hot 100) | 24 |
| Finland (Suomen virallinen singlelista) | 9 |
| France (SNEP) | 15 |
| Ireland (IRMA) | 1 |
| Netherlands (Dutch Top 40) | 15 |
| Netherlands (Single Top 100) | 14 |
| New Zealand (Recorded Music NZ) | 31 |
| Switzerland (Schweizer Hitparade) | 12 |
| UK Singles (Official Charts) | 13 |
| West Germany (GfK) | 23 |

Chart performance for "Liberian Girl" upon Jackson's death
| Chart (2009) | Peak position |
|---|---|
| French Digital Singles Chart (SNEP) | 34 |
| Switzerland (Schweizer Hitparade) | 36 |
| UK Singles (Official Charts) | 86 |

== Certifications ==
| Region | Certification | Certified units/sales |
|---|---|---|
| United Kingdom (BPI) Sales since 2004 | Silver | 200,000^{‡} |
^{‡} Sales+streaming figures based on certification alone.
