= Colin Chilvers =

English video director and special effects coordinator (1945–2024)

- Born: 1945; London, England
- Died: 19 November 2024 (aged 79); Fort Erie, Ontario, Canada
- Occupations: Television and music video director, special effects coordinator

Colin Chilvers (1945 – 19 November 2024) was an English television and music video director and special effects coordinator. He is known for his work on The Rocky Horror Picture Show (1975), Superman (1978), Condorman (1981), and X-Men (2000).

Chilvers directed the "Smooth Criminal" segment from Michael Jackson's Moonwalker. When working with Michael Jackson, Chilvers told Rolling Stone, "I showed Michael a movie that I felt would fit the theme of the piece, The Third Man. He loved the look of it, that sort of film-noir look, so we used that to get the camera man to light it in a similar way."

Chilvers won a Special Achievement Academy Award in 1979 for Superman.

Chilvers died at his home in Fort Erie, Ontario, on 19 November 2024, at the age of 79.

At the 97th Academy Awards, his name was mentioned in the In Memoriam section.

== Awards ==
- Winner of Special Achievement Academy Award 1979 for Superman
- Winner of BAFTA Outstanding British Contribution to Cinema Award 1979 for Superman
- Nominated for Grammy Award 1989 for "Moonwalker"
