= Leave Me Alone (Michael Jackson song) =

Single by Michael Jackson

from the album Bad
- B-side: "Human Nature" (album version)
- Released: January 2, 1989
- Recorded: 1985–1986
- Studio: Westlake (studio D), Los Angeles
- Genre: Funk; pop
- Length: 4:40
- Label: Epic; CBS
- Songwriter: Michael Jackson
- Producers: Quincy Jones; Michael Jackson (co.)

Michael Jackson singles chronology
"Smooth Criminal" (1988)	"Leave Me Alone" (1989)	"Liberian Girl" (1989)

Music video
- "Leave Me Alone" on YouTube

Audio sample
- "Leave Me Alone": file; help

"Leave Me Alone" is a song by American singer Michael Jackson from his seventh studio album, Bad (1987). It was released as the eighth single outside of North America on January 2, 1989, and originally only appeared on CD editions of Bad, as well as the 2001 cassette and digital editions. It was written and composed by Jackson and produced by Jackson and Quincy Jones.

"Leave Me Alone" topped the charts in Greece, the Republic of Ireland, and Spain (in 2006), and peaked within the top ten of the charts in Belgium, New Zealand, Spain (upon its original release), and the United Kingdom. "Leave Me Alone" was generally well received by critics. In the music video, Jackson pokes fun at the rumors about him. The video was the recipient of a Grammy Award in 1990 for Best Music Video.

== Background ==
"Leave Me Alone" was a response to negative rumors about Jackson that frequently appeared in the tabloids post-1985 after the success of Thriller. Beginning in 1986, the tabloids began to publish rumors about Jackson, one of the first being a story claiming that Jackson slept in a hyperbaric oxygen chamber to slow the aging process. A picture leaked out to the media of him lying down in a hyperbaric chamber at a hospital he visited.

When Jackson bought a pet chimpanzee named Bubbles, the tabloids viewed it as evidence of Jackson's increasing detachment from reality. It was also reported that Jackson had offered to buy the bones of Joseph Merrick, the "Elephant Man"; Jackson stated that the story was "a complete lie." These stories inspired the derogatory nickname "Wacko Jacko", which was pinned on Jackson in 1986. He despised the moniker. Another frequent response from the media was about Jackson's plastic surgery. Jackson's manager said of the media's criticism towards the topic, "So many terrible things have been written. Okay, so he had his nose fixed, and the cleft — big deal. I got news for you, my nose has broken five times. It's been fixed twice. Who gives a shit? Who cares? Elvis had his nose done. Marilyn Monroe had her nose done, had her breasts done? Everybody's had it done."

The song has been viewed as having a "paranoia theme", a theme that Jackson had frequently used on previous studio albums. The Atlantic felt that Jackson showed "obvious expressions of distrust" in the song and that the song was one of multiple songs where Jackson's "persistent loneliness in his music" was "prominent". In 2009, J. Edward Keyes, of Rolling Stone, described "Leave Me Alone" as sounding like "vintage Michael" and the song works because of its music, "a batch of thick chords for Jackson to vamp over". Keyes noted that the song was a "kind of darker inversion" of "The Way You Make Me Feel", and that "Leave Me Alone" was "worked-up and angry, and Jackson's aggressive scraping of the high notes makes plain his frustration."

== Composition ==
"Leave Me Alone" is a funk and pop song played with a synthesizer and a guitar. According to MusicNotes.com, the song is set in the key of E♭ minor with Jackson's voice range being sung from B♭_{3} to A♭_{5}. The song's tempo is moderate and its metronome is 124 beats per minute. It is raised from the regular tuning pitch, A440hz.

== Critical and commercial reception ==
"'Leave Me Alone' has the angry edge that is lacking in much of the song 'Bad'."

— Richard Harrington, a writer for The Washington Post

"Leave Me Alone" was generally well received by contemporary music critics. In a retrospective assessment, Stephen Thomas Erlewine, a writer for AllMusic, stated he felt that "Leave Me Alone" was the best track on Bad, commenting "why are all of his best songs paranoid anthems?" Steve Morse, a writer for The Boston Globe, described "Leave Me Alone" as a "send-up" of Jackson's feuds with the "paparazzi-filled tabloids." Jon Pareles, of The New York Times, commented that "Leave Me Alone" had an "unmistakable message". After Jackson's death in June 2009, Rolling Stone listed "Leave Me Alone" as being one of Jackson's most monumental works, and the song's composition was generally praised.

"Leave Me Alone" performed well on various charts. It was released as a single outside the United States and Canada. The song, similar to Bad's previous singles, proved to be a commercial success internationally. "Leave Me Alone"'s most successful territory was Ireland, where the song peaked at No. 1. The song saw similar chart success on the United Kingdom, the Netherlands, Norwegian and Switzerland charts, peaking within the top 10 at Nos. 2, 5, 6 and 10, respectively. "Leave Me Alone" also peaked within the top 20 in Austria, France and Sweden, peaking at Nos. 15, 17 and 19, respectively. The single was least successful in Australia, where the song peaked at number 37.

== Music video ==
The music video for "Leave Me Alone" was directed by Jim Blashfield and produced by Blashfield, Jerry Kramer (who also directed additional footages), Dennis E. Jones, Paul Diener, Jackson, and Frank DiLeo. It was filmed in January 1988 in Culver City, California and was released on January 2, 1989. The video also appeared in the 1988 film Moonwalker. In essence, the video is an amusement park consisting of stylistically crude images based around Jackson's successful career since 1982's Thriller. There is an emphasis on the tabloid view of Jackson's personal life and public image, referring to the nickname "Wacko Jacko" given to him by the press, and the various headlines associated with him in the 1980s. Lampooning rumours that he tried to purchase Joseph Merrick's bones, Jackson dances with stop motion "Elephant Man" bones in the video.

In the video, there are images of shrines to actress Elizabeth Taylor, a real-life close friend of Jackson. Throughout the video newspaper headlines, published by "National Intruder", with bizarre titles are shown, such as "Michael's Space-Age Diet" and "Michael Proposes to Liz". Another notable scene in the music video was a nose being chased by a surgical scalpel, which was a reference to Jackson's plastic surgeries being scrutinized by the media. At the end of the video, it is revealed that a gigantic Jackson himself is the amusement park. He breaks free, tearing the park to pieces. That scene is somewhat reminiscent of Gulliver's Travels, where Gulliver eventually breaks free from the Lilliputians' bonds.

"Leave Me Alone" was the recipient of multiple nominations for its music video. The video won a Grammy Award in 1990 for Best Short Form Music Video at the 32nd Grammy Awards. The video also won the Cannes Gold Lion Award for Best Special Effects. The video also won Best Special Effects at the 1989 MTV Video Music Awards and received five nominations for Video of the Year, Viewers' Choice, Breakthrough Video, Best Editing and Best Art Direction. The winners were respectively: Neil Young's "This Note's for You" ("Video of the Year"), Art of Noise's "Kiss" ("Breakthrough Video"), Paula Abdul's "Straight Up" ("Best Editing"), and Madonna's "Express Yourself" ("Best Cinematography", "Best Art Direction") and "Like a Prayer" ("Viewers' Choice"). Erlewine described the music video as being "weirdly claustrophobic" and felt that, "not coincidentally, it was the best video from the album."

== Track listing ==
- 12" single / 3" CD
1. "Leave Me Alone" – 4:40
2. "Don't Stop 'Til You Get Enough" – 6:04
3. "Human Nature" – 4:05
- 7" single
1. "Leave Me Alone" – 4:40
2. "Human Nature" – 4:06
- Maxi-CD
1. "Leave Me Alone" – 4:40
2. "Don't Stop 'Til You Get Enough" (single version) – 3:55
3. "Human Nature" – 4:05
4. "Wanna Be Startin' Somethin'" (12" version) – 6:30
- Visionary CD side:
1. "Leave Me Alone" – 4:40
2. "Another Part of Me" (extended dance mix) – 6:18
- Visionary DVD side:
1. "Leave Me Alone" (music video) – 4:36

== Personnel ==
Credits adapted from Bad: Special Edition's liner notes:

- Written, composed, vocal synthesizer, solo and background vocals by Michael Jackson
- Produced by Quincy Jones
- Co-produced by Michael Jackson
- Larry Williams – drum programming, synthesizers
- Paul Jackson, Jr. – guitar
- Casey Young – Synclavier, synthesizer programming
- Greg Phillinganes – synthesizer
- Rhythm and vocal arrangements by Michael Jackson

== Charts ==
=== Weekly charts ===
1989 weekly chart performance for "Leave Me Alone"
Chart (1989)	Peak position
Australia (ARIA)	37
Austria (Ö3 Austria Top 40)	15
Belgium (Ultratop 50 Flanders)	3
Europe (Eurochart Hot 100)	7
Finland (Suomen virallinen singlelista)	7
Finland Radio (Suomen virallinen radiosoittolista)	3
France (SNEP)	17
Greece (IFPI)	1
Ireland (IRMA)	1
Italy (Musica e dischi)	11
Netherlands (Dutch Top 40)	6
Netherlands (Single Top 100)	5
New Zealand (Recorded Music NZ)	9
Norway (VG-lista)	6
Spain (AFYVE)	5
Sweden (Sverigetopplistan)	19
Switzerland (Schweizer Hitparade)	10
UK Singles (Official Charts)	2
West Germany (GfK)	16

2006 weekly chart performance for "Leave Me Alone"
Chart (2006)	Peak position
France (SNEP)	54
Ireland (IRMA)	30
Italy (FIMI)	8
Netherlands (Single Top 100)	21
Spain (Promusicae)	1
UK Singles (Official Charts)	15

2009 weekly chart performance for "Leave Me Alone"
Chart (2009)	Peak position
Netherlands (Single Top 100)	100
UK Singles (Official Charts)	66

=== Year-end charts ===
Year-end chart performance for "Leave Me Alone"
Chart (1989)	Position
Belgium (Ultratop 50 Flanders)	56
Europe (Eurochart Hot 100)	68
Netherlands (Single Top 100)	71
UK Singles (OCC)	44

== Certifications ==
Certifications for "Leave Me Alone"
Region	Certification	Certified units/sales
United Kingdom (BPI)	Silver	200,000^{‡}
^{‡} Sales+streaming figures based on certification alone.

== See also ==
- List of number-one singles of 1989 (Ireland)
- List of number-one singles of 2006 (Spain)
