= Bad (album) =

1987 studio album by Michael Jackson

- Original 1987 cover

Studio album by Michael Jackson
- Released: August 31, 1987
- Recorded: January 1985 – July 1987
- Studio: Westlake (Los Angeles)
- Genres: Dance-pop; R&B
- Length: 43:28 (LP version); 48:08 (CD version)
- Label: Epic
- Producers: Quincy Jones; Michael Jackson (co.)

Michael Jackson chronology
Anthology (1986)	Bad (1987)	The Original Soul of Michael Jackson (1987)

Singles from Bad
- 1. "I Just Can't Stop Loving You" Released: July 20, 1987; 2. "Bad" Released: September 7, 1987; 3. "The Way You Make Me Feel" Released: October 31, 1987; 4. "Man in the Mirror" Released: January 16, 1988; 5. "Dirty Diana" Released: April 18, 1988; 6. "Another Part of Me" Released: July 11, 1988; 7. "Smooth Criminal" Released: October 13, 1988; 8. "Leave Me Alone" Released: January 2, 1989 (Note: Only released as a single outside of Canada and the United States.); 9. "Liberian Girl" Released: July 3, 1989

Bad is the seventh studio album by the American singer Michael Jackson. It was released on August 31, 1987, by Epic Records. Highly anticipated, the album took two years to produce between 1985 and 1987, and was Jackson's third and final collaboration with producer Quincy Jones. A dance-pop and R&B album, it captures Jackson with greater artistic freedom, as he composed and co-produced all but two of its tracks, discussing celebrity, romance, world peace, and self-improvement. The album features appearances from Siedah Garrett and Stevie Wonder.

Following the enormous success of his previous album, Thriller (1982), Jackson faced greater expectations than ever before. He adopted an edgier sound, incorporating new digital synthesizer technology and elements of hard rock and funk, among other styles. He reinvented his look to evoke a tougher image, but his lighter complexion and plastic surgery sparked controversy in the US. The Bad tour, Jackson's first solo world tour, grossed $125 million to become one of the highest-grossing concert tours at the time. Nine commercial singles were released along with a promotional single.

Bad received acclaim from critics, particularly for Jackson's vocals and its musical arrangements, though some felt it failed to match Thriller. It remained atop the Billboard Top Pop Albums chart for six consecutive weeks and produced a record five number-one hits on the Billboard Hot 100: "I Just Can't Stop Loving You", "Bad", "The Way You Make Me Feel", "Man in the Mirror" and "Dirty Diana", while "Smooth Criminal" was a Top 10 hit. Worldwide, it became the fastest-selling album in its first week, topped the charts in twenty-four other countries, and was the best-selling album of both 1987 and 1988.

Bad is one of the best-selling albums of all time, with sales of over 35 million copies worldwide, and is certified 11× platinum in the US. The album earned Grammy Awards for Best Engineered Recording – Non Classical and Best Music Video (for "Leave Me Alone"), and was nominated for Album of the Year. Jackson received the special Award of Achievement at the 1989 American Music Awards for the album's commercial successes. It has been included in numerous lists of the greatest albums of all time and is praised as part of Jackson's influence on contemporary music.

== Background ==
Michael Jackson released his sixth studio album, Thriller (1982), on November 29, 1982. By the end of 1983, it became the best-selling album of all time, with 32 million copies sold worldwide. The success gave Jackson a cultural significance greater than any African American in the history of the entertainment industry.

The years that followed were marred by personal turmoil, including strained family ties, broken friendships with celebrities, a break with the Jehovah's Witnesses, and the pressures of global stardom. Jackson withdrew from the public eye for much of 1985 and 1986 but remained in headlines due to his eccentric behavior, including his adoption of a chimpanzee named Bubbles. Several rumors also circulated, including a false claim that he slept in a hyperbaric chamber.

According to those close to him, Jackson was anxious about finishing the follow-up to Thriller. Ken Tucker of NPR Music noted that it was nearly impossible for any album to replicate the unprecedented commercial success or cultural phenomenon of Thriller. In 2017, Newsweek described the challenge as "like following up the Bible". Despite the doubts of Jackson ever matching the impact and commercial success that Thriller achieved, he aimed to sell 100 million copies with his next album.

== Production and recording ==
Bad was Jackson's final collaboration with producer Quincy Jones, who had also worked with him on Off the Wall (1979) and Thriller. While Jackson had contributed a few songs to those albums, Jones encouraged him to write more for his next project. Reflecting on Jackson's growing personal struggles, Jones recalled: "All the turmoil [in Jackson's life] was starting to mount up, so I said I thought it was time for him to do a very honest album." Jackson wanted to pursue a new direction, aiming for a harder-edged and more aggressive sound. Guitarist Steve Stevens recalled him expressing interest in rock bands like Mötley Crüe. Jackson was eager to find innovative sounds and was interested in new music technology. As a result, the production team used digital synthesizers, including FM synthesis, the Fairlight CMI, and the Synclavier PSMT, often layering synthesizers to create new sounds. The sessions also incorporated guitars, organs, drums, bass, percussion, saxophones, washboards and digital guitars. In Lily Rothman of Time's view, Jackson was more involved than ever in the artistic process of Bad.

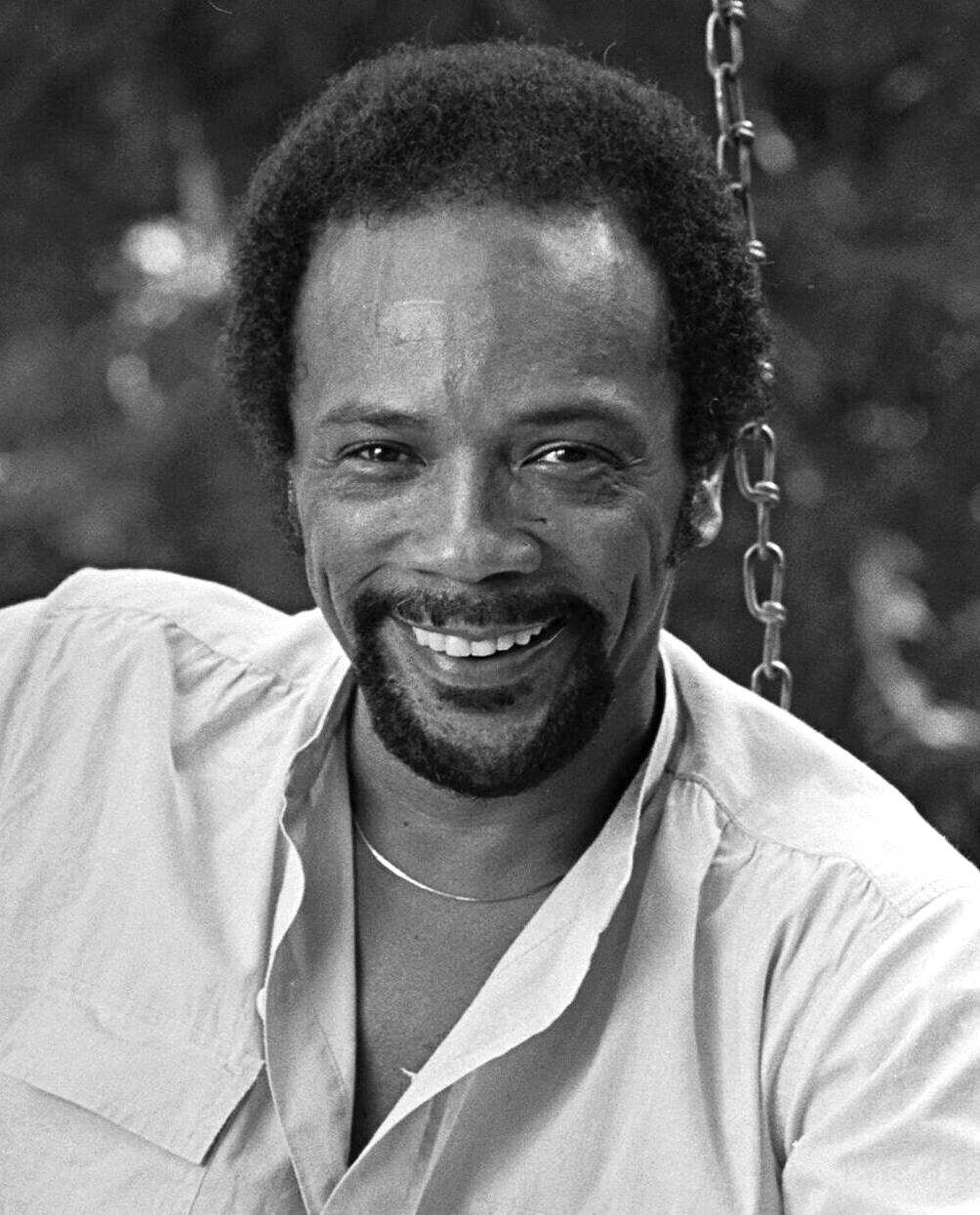
Quincy Jones co-produced Bad.

Jackson began recording demos and ideas for the album in 1983, while simultaneously working on Victory (1984) with his brothers, the Jacksons. Throughout 1985 and 1986, he focused on writing and recording at his Hayvenhurst home studio in Encino, Los Angeles, alongside a group of musicians and engineers—comprising Bill Bottrell, Matt Forger, John Barnes, and Christopher Currell—referred to as the "B team". These demos were brought to Westlake Studios, where such producers as Jones and engineer Bruce Swedien— the "A team"—completed the tracks. According to Jones, the sessions were so intense that the team would often work for days without rest: "They were carrying second engineers out on stretchers. I was smoking 180 cigarettes a day." Jackson continued working with the "B team" at Hayvenhurst at the same time as the "A team" at Westlake, much to Jones' frustration; the B team was dissolved by early 1987.

Progress was interrupted in July 1984 when Jackson joined his brothers on the Victory Tour. Recording resumed in January 1985 following his work on the charity single "We Are the World". Later that year, production paused again as Jackson worked on Disney's 4D film Captain EO (1986), which included an early version of the track "Another Part of Me". Recording began with Jones and the "A team" at Westlake in August 1986, which continued through to November, pausing while Jackson filmed the "Bad" music video. After the video was completed, recording at Westlake resumed in January 1987 and was completed by July. Jackson reportedly wrote around sixty songs and recorded thirty-three, wanting to release them all on a three-disc set. However, Jones encouraged him to narrow it to an eleven-track album. Jackson wrote all but two tracks: "Just Good Friends" was written by Terry Britten and Graham Lyle, and "Man in the Mirror" by Siedah Garrett and Glen Ballard.

== Title and artwork ==
To represent Jackson's shift from a youthful image to a tougher, streetwise persona, the title Bad was chosen, evoking the street slang meaning "great", as well as "tough" and "courageous". Jackson reinvented his look with black clothing, buckles, and metal-studded belts, projecting an edgier style. However, his changed appearance—including a lighter complexion and plastic surgery—sparked significant controversy, especially among American audiences. Jackson's skin had begun lightening as a result of vitiligo (which occurs in patches but was obscured by makeup) in the early 1980s, but the album was the first major release of his catalog to showcase his altered appearance.

Jackson chose photographer Sam Emerson to shoot the album cover. The initial design was inspired by a 1924 photograph of actress Gloria Swanson behind black lace, but company executive Walter Yetnikoff rejected it and suggested a more urban depiction. As a result, Emerson chose a photograph of Jackson in his wardrobe from the music video for the title track, which had been taken during the video's production. Emerson was paid $5,000 for the use of the photo. The photo showed Jackson against a white background wearing light brown contact lenses (adding a glossy look to his eyes) to make his black wardrobe stand out. The graffiti style of the album title was also inspired by the music video. It became a frequently reproduced and iconic image, and was parodied on the cover of "Weird Al" Yankovic's 1988 album Even Worse.

== Songs ==
=== Side one ===
"Bad" was written and recorded by Jackson in November 1986. It features drums played by John Robinson who had previously worked with Jackson and Jones on Off the Wall (1979). According to Jackson, it was inspired by a true story he had read in a newspaper about a boy from "the ghetto" who went to a private school in Upstate New York. When he returned, his friends were so jealous that they killed him. Various Jackson biographers have concluded that the story he was referring was that of Edmund Perry. However, Perry was not killed by children in his neighborhood; he was killed by a plainclothes police officer when Perry and his brother allegedly attacked and badly beat the officer in a mugging attempt.

Originally conceived under the working title of "P", "Who's Bad" was planned as a duet between Jackson and Prince, after Jones suggested they record a song together. Prince said in 1997 that he declined because of reservations he had with the opening line of the song, "Your butt is mine." Instead, he (allegedly) reworked the track to how he personally envisioned it, as well as offering Jackson "Wouldn't U Love 2 Love Me", a song he wrote that dates back to 1978, but Jackson rejected it.

"The Way You Make Me Feel" was first created by Jackson in September 1985 under the working title "Hot Fever". The final version of the track was recorded and worked on between late 1986 and early 1987. It was written by him and co-produced with Jones. It features horn arrangements by Jerry Hey of Seawind and other members of the group who had worked on Off the Wall and Thriller.

"Speed Demon" was written by Jackson in May 1986 and recorded in early 1987. According to Jones, Jackson wrote the song after he received a traffic ticket, which caused him to arrive late to the recording studio session. Upon his explanation to the studio crew, Quincy implored Michael to write about how he felt about it, to which Jackson starts writing "Speed Demon". The song begins with a racing-car intro, which was proposed by Christopher Currell, who plays the Synclavier on the song; he is credited for the sound effects. Other musicians on the song include Greg Phillinganes on synthesizer and Paulinho da Costa on percussion.

"Liberian Girl" was originally written and recorded in November 1983 for inclusion on the Jacksons' 1984 album Victory however it didn't make cut. Jackson then re-recorded the song for Bad in late 1986. Jackson stated in a 1987 interview with Jet magazine, shortly after Bad was released, that the song came up to him while he was busy "playing pinball", then he "went quickly upstairs" to record it to tape, as he had always done with songs he had written. It features synthesizer played by Michael Boddicker, who had also played on several songs on Thriller and the charity single "We Are the World". David Paich and Steve Porcaro of the band Toto, who had also previously worked on Thriller, provided synthesizer and synthesizer programming respectively. The song also features a Swahili chant from South African jazz singer, Letta Mbulu.

"Just Good Friends" is one of the two songs on the album which was not written by Jackson himself. Written and composed by Terry Britten and Graham Lyle, It is a duet featuring Stevie Wonder and was recorded on June 18, 1987. Wonder had previously worked on Off the Wall with Jackson and Jones, writing "I Can't Help It". Wonder also plays the synthesizer solo on the song. Jackson returned the compliment to Stevie Wonder in September 1987 by recording "Get It" for Wonder's 1987 Characters album.

=== Side two ===
According to John Barnes, "Another Part of Me" was initially developed with Jackson in October 1984 and recorded in early 1985 after it was selected for inclusion on the 3D science fiction short film Captain EO, directed by Francis Ford Coppola, which was released in 1986. "Another Part of Me" could be heard at the end of Captain EO, as the title character and his crew triumphantly exit and fly off into space. Jackson would then revisit and further develop the song between September 1986 and mid 1987 after it was decided to be included on the Bad album.

"Man in the Mirror" is also one of the two songs on the Bad album which was not written by Jackson. It was written by Siedah Garrett and Glen Ballard in January 1987, after Jones invited a group of songwriters to a dinner at his home, asking them to 'write hits' for Jackson's new album. Garrett came up with a line about a man looking in the mirror and Ballard came up with the melody; then they recorded a demo within the week. The song, along with "I Just Can't Stop Loving You", was recorded by Jackson between May and June 1987. An excited Garrett called Jones while he was in a meeting, telling him that they had come up with a good song that would be a perfect fit. At Jackson's request, Ballard and Garrett wrote a longer middle eight and modified the lyrics. Jones enlisted the Andraé Crouch choir to record gospel vocals.

"I Just Can't Stop Loving You" is a ballad style song, written by Jackson in late 1986 and recorded by Jackson and Garrett in April 1987. Garrett was also the one who co-wrote Man in the Mirror. According to Jones, Jackson initially wanted Whitney Houston or Barbra Streisand to sing the duet with him. Streisand declined and Houston's label, Arista Records, thought it was "too risky" for her to do the collaboration, as she was in the process of promoting her then new album Whitney. It was the first time since 1979's Off the Wall that Jackson had collaborated with a female artist on a duet, which was "It's the Falling in Love" with Patti Austin. Jones produced the song with Jackson receiving co-producing credits, as with the rest of the album.

"Dirty Diana" is a hard rock song originally written and recorded by Jackson in late 1983, presumably for The Jacksons' Victory album, however it was shelved. After being revisited in 1984 and 1985, it was chosen to be included for the album; the song was re-recorded in January 1987. "Dirty Diana" was noted for having lyrical themes such as the ones of "Billie Jean". Jackson sings about a woman who "likes the boys in the band", which may be a reference to the "groupies" he had previously said liked to hang out around him and his brothers, in the early days of the Jackson Five. The song has three verses and three bridges. It has, furthermore, a guitar solo by Billy Idol's guitarist, Steve Stevens. The song's outro ends with Jackson singing "come on" into a fade with "hey baby wontcha" in the ad-lib.

"Smooth Criminal" is noted as sinister and has been described by writers as one of Jackson's most captivating songs in his career. The song was originally written by Jackson in mid 1985 and recorded in late 1986. The song was produced by Jones and co-produced by Jackson, with Swedien being the engineer. The song begins with an eerie heartbeat-like sound, setting the tone for the recurring theme of the track, and the lyrics immediately launch into a depiction of a crime scene, where a woman is assaulted in her apartment by a mysterious "smooth criminal." Jackson's repeated line, "Annie, are you OK?" draws inspiration from Resusci Anne, a mannequin used in CPR training. Jackson combined the common training question, "Are you OK?" with the mannequin's name, giving rise to this would be iconic lyric.

"Leave Me Alone", written in August 1985 and recorded in June 1987, was a response to negative rumors about Jackson that appeared in tabloids following the success of Thriller. Disguised as a song about moving on from a romantic lover, it been viewed as having a "paranoia theme", which is further supported by its accompanying music video filmed for Moonwalker, in which many of the tabloid stories about Jackson appear in exaggerated forms. "Leave Me Alone" was also the final song recorded and mixed for the album.

== Composition and lyrics ==
Bad primarily incorporates dance-pop and R&B. It also explores other genres such as funk, soul, jazz, and hard rock. Jon Pareles of The New York Times described Bad as a "gleaming, high-tech dance record". It is heavier and more "aggressive" than Thriller, with Jackson moving away from the heavy-groove sound and high-pitched vocals of his prior records. Writing for NPR Music, Ken Tucker highlighted the "rough, upbeat" music. Stephen Thomas Erlewine of AllMusic noted that Bad moved Jackson "deeper into hard rock, deeper into schmaltzy adult contemporary, deeper into hard dance – essentially taking each portion of Thriller to an extreme, while increasing the quotient of immaculate studiocraft." Howard Applebaum, who was one of 50 people invited to Jackson's Encino home to listen to Bad before its release, described it as "kind of a stretch within the genre of contemporary hit radio and urban music. It's cooler sounding, a little more jazzy in spots".

According to Tony Perry of The Evening News, lyrically Bad has a "cockiness" and an "arrogant swagger" that was not seen in Jackson's prior releases. The lyrics also feature romance and paranoia, the latter being a recurring theme in Jackson's albums. "Bad" was originally intended as a duet between Jackson and Prince (and Jackson had also planned duets with Diana Ross, Whitney Houston, Aretha Franklin and Barbra Streisand). The song was viewed as a revived "Hit the Road Jack" progression with lyrics that pertain to boasting. "Dirty Diana" was viewed by AllMusic's Stephen Thomas Erlewine as misogynistic and its lyrics describing a sexual predator do not aim for the "darkness" of "Billie Jean", instead sounding equally intrigued by and apprehensive of a sexual challenge, while having the opportunity to accept or resist it. "Leave Me Alone" was described as a "paranoid anthem". "Man in the Mirror" was seen as Jackson going "a step further" and offering "a straightforward homily of personal commitment", which can be seen in the lyrics, "I'm starting with the man in the mirror / I'm asking him to change his ways / And no message could have been any clearer / If you wanna make the world a better place / Take a look at yourself and then make a change."

The lyrics to "Liberian Girl" were viewed as "glistening" with "gratitude" for the "existence of a loved one", while those to "Smooth Criminal" recalled "the popcorn-chomping manner" of "Thriller". The track was thought of as an example of "Jackson's free-form language" that keeps people "aware that we are on the edge of several realities: the film, the dream it inspires, the waking world it illuminates". The music in "I Just Can't Stop Loving You", a duet with Siedah Garrett, consisted mainly of finger snaps and timpani. "Just Good Friends" is a duet with Stevie Wonder; Jones admitted later: "I made a mistake with ['Just Good Friends']. That didn't work."

Jackson's mother, Katherine Jackson, wanted him to write an R&B song with a shuffle rhythm, which came to be "The Way You Make Me Feel". The song consists of blues harmonies and a jazz-like tone, comparable to the classic Motown sound of the 1960s. The lyrics of "Another Part of Me" deal with being united, as "we". Critics Richard Cromelin (from the Los Angeles Times) and Richard Harrington (from The Washington Post) associated the lyrics with the Harmonic Convergence phenomenon that occurred around the time of the album's release, with Harrington highlighting the verse: "The planets are lining up / We're bringing brighter days / They're all in line / Waiting for you / Can't you see? / You're just another part of me".

== Release and commercial reception ==
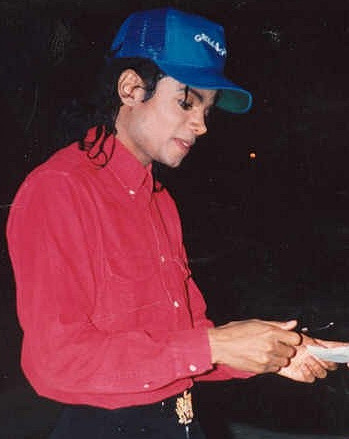
Jackson signing an autograph during the "Bad Era"

The anticipation for Bad was extremely high, with journalists from Slant Magazine and Miami Herald asserting it as the most anticipated album in history. Michael Goldberg and David Handelman had predicted that "If Bad sells 'only' 10 million copies, that will be more than virtually any other record, but could be viewed as a failure for Michael Jackson". Released on August 31, 1987, a brief second wave of 'Michaelmania' took place as fans around the US rushed to purchase Bad. A manager at a US record store compared the intense demand for Bad to the demand that Bruce Springsteen's Live 1975–85 experienced the previous year and The Beatles' debut album Please Please Me experienced in July 1987 (released in the US for the first time). In the US, Bad debuted at number one on the Billboard Top Pop Albums chart and remained there for six consecutive weeks, selling over 2.25 million copies in its first week, which made it the fastest-selling album in US history at the time. In June 1988, nine months after its release, it was certified 6× Platinum, equalling the US sales of Off the Wall and making Jackson the first artist to have three consecutive albums sell more than six million copies each in the US. In 2021, the album was certified 11× Platinum by the Recording Industry Association of America (RIAA), making it Jackson's second-most successful album in the US.

Despite Bad generating five number-one singles in the US, many in the American media labelled it a disappointment due to it largely falling short of the sales that Thriller achieved in the country, which sold 12 million copies by December 1983 (a little over a year after its release) according to Billboard. The underperformance in sales for Bad in the US was widely attributed to Jackson's controversial new image. In some of Washington's neighborhoods where Bad posters hung on utility poles, the pictures were mutilated with spray paint and knives. Na'im Akbar, an African American psychologist, condemned Jackson: "As far as I'm concerned, Michael Jackson engaged in a form of self-mutilation that was a rejection of his cultural self". In a 1988 Rolling Stone readers poll of 23,000 readers, Jackson was voted the worst male singer, worst male rock artist, worst dressed, worst album (Bad), worst single ("Bad"), worst video ("Bad"), worst album cover (Bad), worst hype of the year and most unwelcome comeback. Editor David Wild remarked that the backlash to Jackson in the US was more to do with his "quirky personality" than his music. In 1989, Jackson's manager, Frank DiLeo, said that he and Jackson were happy with the results of Bad. In DiLeo's view, "Americans like to build 'em up and tear 'em down", further saying "I'm sure that affected us. But we did the best we could."

Whilst the hysteria of 'Michaelmania' diminished in the US, overseas it was still in full bloom. Bad became the fastest-selling album of all time following its release. Besides the US, it reached number one in twenty-four other countries, including Austria, Canada, Japan, New Zealand, Norway, Sweden, Switzerland and the UK. It also charted at No. 13 in Mexico and at No. 22 in Portugal. Within a year of its release, Bad was established as a blockbuster, selling around 18 million copies. It was the best-selling album worldwide of 1987, with approximately 11 million copies sold globally that year, and went on to also rank as the best-selling album worldwide in 1988. By January 1989, sales of Bad reached 20 million, and by 1991 it was the second-best-selling album of all time, behind Thriller, having sold 25 million copies. Bad has sold over 35 million copies worldwide, which ranks it within the top 10 best-selling albums ever.

In the UK, Bad was hugely successful: it debuted at number one on the UK Albums Chart with 350,000 copies sold in first week sales, a record at that time. Bad achieved sales of 1.6 million copies under four months in UK, and in the following year it sold 980,000 copies. It was the UK's best-selling album of 1987 and third best-selling album of 1989. Bad was also the UK's second best-selling album of the 1980s, surpassing Thriller. Today, Bad is certified 14 times Platinum in the UK with sales of 4.2 million, making it Jackson's second best-selling album there. Bad was certified diamond in France, selling 1.4 million copies. It was also certified diamond by the Canadian Recording Industry Association for shipments exceeding 1,000,000 copies. In Europe, the 2001 reissue was certified platinum for sales of one million units. Bad was also certified platinum for the shipment of over 20,000 copies in Hong Kong.

== Promotion ==
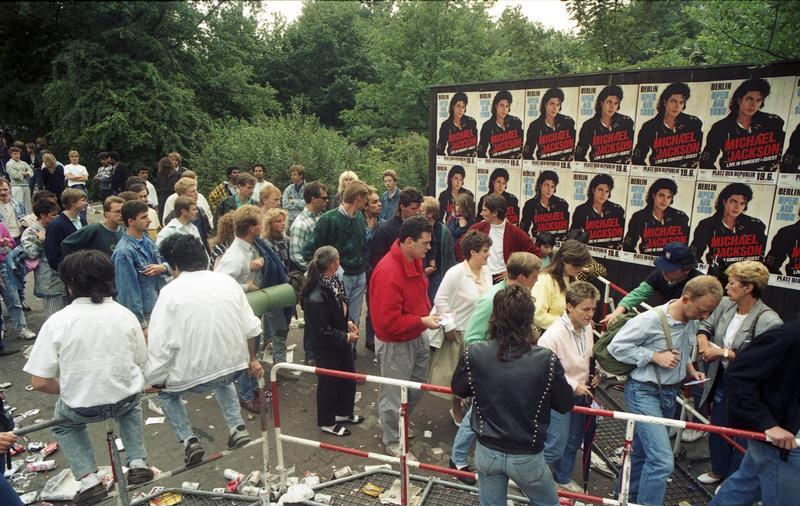
Fans in West Berlin lining up for the Bad tour concert on June 19, 1988

The marketing strategy for Bad was modeled on that for Thriller. Like the first Thriller single, "The Girl Is Mine", the first Bad single, "I Just Can't Stop Loving You", was a ballad duet, followed by two "more obvious modern pop knockouts" backed by music videos.

A commemorative special on Jackson's life, The Magic Returns, aired on CBS during prime time on the day of the release of Bad. At the end of the documentary, the channel debuted the short film for "Bad", directed by Martin Scorsese and featuring Wesley Snipes. The marketing strategy, mastered by DiLeo among others, also included Jackson producing another mini-movie around the time of the Bad world tour. That film, Moonwalker (1988), included performances of songs from Bad: "Speed Demon", "Leave Me Alone", "Man in the Mirror", and "Smooth Criminal", the latter two released as sole videos at the end of the film. The film also included the music video for "Come Together", with the song featuring seven years later on HIStory: Past, Present and Future, Book I. It became the best-selling home video of all time. Sponsored by Pepsi, the Bad tour began in Japan, marking Jackson's first performances there since 1972 with the Jackson 5. Attendance figures for the first 14 dates in Japan totaled a record-breaking 450,000. Jackson performed seven sold-out shows at Wembley Stadium, beating the previous record held by Madonna, Bruce Springsteen and Genesis. The third concert on July 16, 1988, was attended by Diana, Princess of Wales and Prince Charles. Jackson was entered into the Guinness World Records three times from the tour alone. The Bad tour was a major financial success, grossing $125 million. Jackson performed 123 concerts in 15 countries to an audience of 4.4 million. The tour set records for both the largest grossing tour in history and the largest paid attendance.

Jackson performed two songs – "The Way You Make Me Feel" and "Man in the Mirror" – at the 1988 Grammy Awards, having declined to perform during the Thriller era in 1984. According to Paul Grein of Billboard, Jackson's performance at the show stands as "Exhibit A to anyone who wants proof of his artistry and command when he was at the peak of his powers." Robert Hilburn of the Los Angeles Times described it as "one of the most striking performances ever by a pop performer on national television", a performance that "overshadowed everything else" in the ceremony. "Man in the Mirror" was nominated for Record of the Year a year later at the 1989 Grammy Awards.

== Singles ==
"I Just Can't Stop Loving You", a duet with Siedah Garrett, was the lead single. It peaked at number one on the Billboard Hot 100 and also reached number one in Belgium, Canada, Ireland, the Netherlands, Norway, Spain, the UK and Zimbabwe.

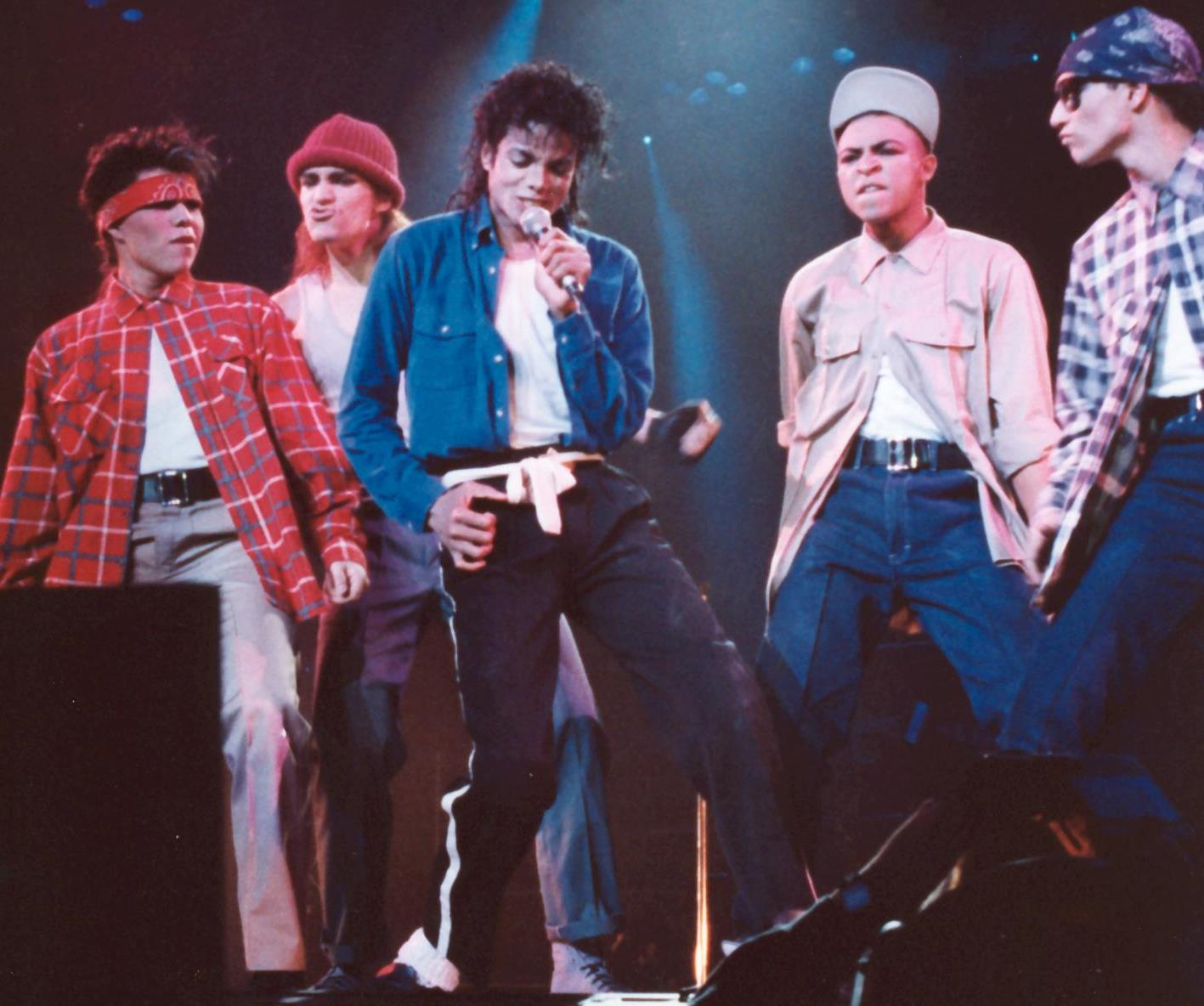
Jackson performing "The Way You Make Me Feel" on tour

"Bad" was the album's second number-one single and Jackson's eighth number one on the Billboard Hot 100, and remained here for two weeks. It also reached number one on the Hot R&B Singles, Hot Dance Club Play and Rhythmic chart. Internationally, the song was also commercially successful, charting at the top of the charts in seven other countries including Ireland, Italy, Norway, Spain, and the Netherlands. "The Way You Make Me Feel" was the third consecutive Billboard Hot 100 number one and reached number one in Ireland and Spain. "Man in the Mirror" reached number one on the Billboard Hot 100 and in Italy, as well as top 5 in Canada. On July 2, 1988, "Dirty Diana" became the record-breaking fifth Billboard Hot 100 number-one single from Bad. Jackson was the first artist in history to achieve five number-one singles on the Hot 100 from one album. In recognition of this achievement, Epic Records released a promotional poster including the text "No One's Ever Been This Bad". Before the start of the Wembley Stadium show during the Bad tour in 1988, Diana, Princess of Wales, who was in attendance, informed Jackson that it was one of her favorite songs. "Another Part of Me" achieved less success, reaching number 11 on the Billboard Hot 100, but topped the R&B singles chart. Like Jackson's earlier songs in his career such as "Can You Feel It" and "We Are the World", the lyrics of the song emphasize global unity, love and outreach. "Smooth Criminal" became the sixth top 10 single on the Billboard Hot 100, peaking at number seven. The song reached number one in Belgium, Iceland, the Netherlands and Spain. Though it did not top any chart, in retrospective reviews it has been acclaimed as one of the best songs on Bad and one of Jackson's signature songs. Released outside the United States and Canada, "Leave Me Alone" topped the Irish charts and reached the top ten in five other countries. "Leave Me Alone" was Jackson's response to negative and exaggerated rumors about him that frequently appeared in the tabloids post-1985 after the success of Thriller. The music video was the recipient of Best Music Video at the 1990 Grammy Awards.

The final single, "Liberian Girl", did not chart on the Billboard Hot 100, but reached the top 20 in various countries and reached number one in Ireland. The song has been sampled and covered by various artists including Chico Freeman, 2Pac and MC Lyte. "Speed Demon", written and co-produced by Jackson in 1986, was released as a promotional single on September 4, 1989, as part of the campaign around his 1988 film Moonwalker.

Bad's record of five number one singles was tied by American singer Katy Perry's Teenage Dream in 2011; Perry remains the only artist to have matched this feat. In the UK, seven of the Bad singles reached the UK top ten which was a record for any studio album for over 20 years.

=== Notable covers ===
In 1988, "Weird Al" Yankovic recorded "Fat", a parody of "Bad", which won a Grammy Award for Best Concept Music Video at the 1989 Grammy Awards.

In 2001, hard rock band Alien Ant Farm released a cover of "Smooth Criminal" for their second album, Anthology. Their cover peaked at no. 1 in Australia, where it remained for eight weeks. It also peaked in the top ten of 14 European countries, including the United Kingdom, Germany, Sweden, and Switzerland, and peaked at no. 23 on the Hot 100.

== Critical reception ==
Professional ratings
Review scores
Source	Rating
The London Gazette	3/5 stars
Los Angeles Times	3/4 stars
The Times	4/5 stars
Sounds	4/5 stars
The Philadelphia Inquirer	4/4 stars
Q	5/5 stars
Record Mirror	4.5/5 stars
Rolling Stone	4/5 stars
Smash Hits	7/10
The Village Voice	B+

Retrospective ratings
Review scores
Source	Rating
AllMusic	4.5/5 stars
Blender	4/5 stars
Christgau's Record Guide	B+
Encyclopedia of Popular Music	3/5 stars
Entertainment Weekly	B+
MusicHound Rock	3.5/5 stars
The Rolling Stone Album Guide	3.5/5 stars
Tom Hull – on the Web	B+
Uncut	4/5 stars

Bad was acclaimed by critics. Edwin J Bernard of Record Mirror said it was better than Thriller, praising it as having "little compromise and a lot of genius". Simon Frith of The Times described it as "peerless pop: funky, flamboyant, and just a touch feral." Frith compares Bad with Thriller, writing, "If Thriller was magic, Bad is mastery—consistent, confident, but cozy." Jay Cocks for Time lauded Jackson's vocals and highlighted "Man in the Mirror" as one of the finest achievements in Jackson's career. Tim O'Connor of the Chicago Sun-Times described Bad as "excellent" and lauded Jackson's vocals: "[Jackson] once again proves that no pop singer can touch him for pure musicality [...] perhaps no other pop album has reproduced the human voice with such breadth and brilliance". O'Connor concluded his review by saying, "Bad is yet another affirmation of [Jackson's] monumental talent."

In USA Today, Edna Gundersen called Bad Jackson's "most polished effort to date". Eddie Huffman reviewed Bad in Times-News, observing that it features a "healthily eclectic combination of musical styles, forceful, revealing lyrics and a maturity". Huffman also considered Bad a more consistent album than Thriller, despite feeling that the best songs do not match the peaks of Thriller, lauding it as a "worthy follow up" to Thriller and Off the Wall. Rolling Stone's Davitt Sigerson also viewed Bad as better than Thriller, noting that the filler, such as "Speed Demon", "Dirty Diana" and "Liberian Girl", made it "richer, sexier and better than Thriller's forgettables." In a favorable review for Creem, Richard C. Walls described Bad as "tuneful, clever, infectious pop", but considered it "more of the same" as Thriller and "not an advancement".

Other critics praised Bad, but felt it lacked the qualities that had defined Thriller. The Village Voice critic Robert Christgau lamented the lack of "genius" in the vein of "Beat It" or "Billie Jean". Richard Cook of Sounds said Bad lacks "that once-in-a-lifetime spark" in comparison to Thriller, whilst Richard Harrington of The Washington Post felt that that it would be "considerably fairer to compare" Bad with Off the Wall. Richard Cromelin of the Los Angeles Times was of similar view to Harrington and felt that it would be "disappointing" if the "creative level" was where Jackson wants to stay. In a retrospective comment in 1991, Richard W. Stevenson of the Tampa Bay Times considered the album a letdown for Jackson, and said it was largely derivative of Thriller.

Despite critics initially feeling that Bad lacked a milestone recording like Thriller had featured with "Beat It" and "Billie Jean", retrospective reviews often include "Man in the Mirror" and "Smooth Criminal" amongst Jackson's best songs.

=== Awards ===
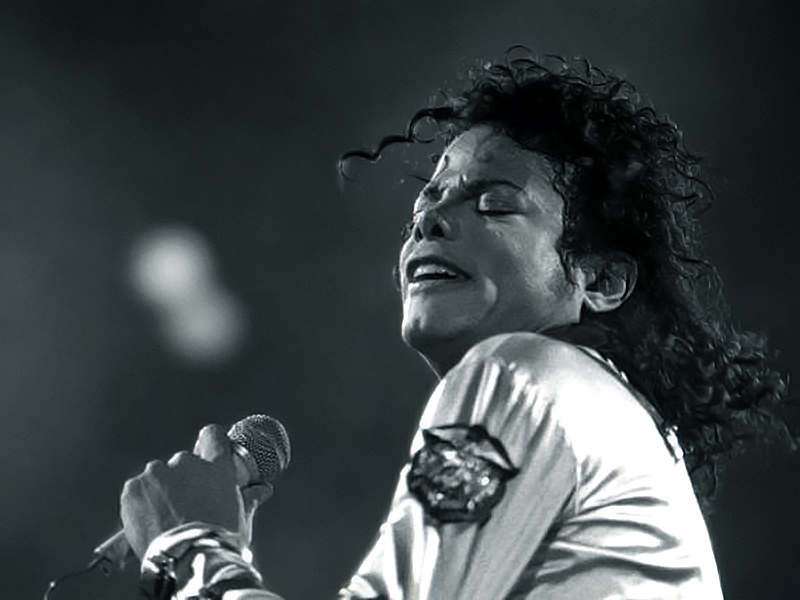
Jackson received numerous honors for Bad, but his lack of Grammy Awards was considered a snub.

At the 1988 Grammy Awards, Jackson was the tied-most nominated artist (outside of the classical field): Bad was nominated for Album of the Year, Best Pop Vocal Performance – Male, Best R&B Vocal Performance – Male (for "Bad"), and Best Engineered Recording – Non Classical, and Jones and Jackson were nominated for Producer of the Year, Non-Classical. Although Bad won Best Engineered Recording – Non Classical, this went to the producers. Jackson's zero wins was the subject of media attention; American entertainer Little Richard, who was at the ceremony, said "I'm shocked. I'm stunned [...] I think a lot of people are." Writing for the Los Angeles Times, Hilburn said Jackson deserved to win at least one of the Vocal Performance awards, but not Album of the Year, which U2's highly acclaimed The Joshua Tree (1987) won. "Man in the Mirror" was nominated for Record of the Year in the following year and "Leave Me Alone" won Best Music Video – Short Form in 1990.

Despite the lack of Grammy Awards for Jackson, he won numerous other awards for Bad. "Bad" won Favorite Soul/R&B Song at the 1988 American Music Awards. At the 1988 Soul Train Music Awards, Bad won Best R&B/Soul Album – Male and "Bad" won Best R&B/Soul Single – Male. The following year, "Man in the Mirror" also won Best R&B/Soul Single – Male. Bad won Best Album at the 1988 NAACP Image Awards. The album also received international honors and nominations. On October 6, 1987, five weeks after its release, Bad was voted Best LP in the British-based Smash Hits readers poll. In 1988, the Japan Gold Disc Awards awarded Bad the Grand Prix Album of the Year. In the following year, it was nominated for International Album of the Year by the Juno Awards in Canada. At the 1988 Brit Awards, Jackson was awarded the International Solo Artist award. At the 1989 Brit Awards, Jackson was also awarded the inaugural International Male Solo Artist award, and "Smooth Criminal" won British Video of the Year.

Jackson received several special awards in recognition of his success during the Bad era. In 1988, he was honored with Billboard's first Spotlight Award for being the first artist in history to achieve five number 1 singles on the Hot 100 from a single album. He also received the Lifetime Achievement Award at the American Music Awards of 1989 and the Heritage Lifetime Achievement Award at the 1989 Soul Train Music Awards. Following the appraisal of the music videos of the singles from Bad, along with his previous music videos throughout the 1980s, Jackson was awarded the MTV Video Vanguard Artist of the Decade Award. On April 5, 1990, Jackson was honored at the White House for being named as the "Artist of the Decade" by the Capital Children's Museum following his continued success with Bad.

=== Rankings ===
Having been ranked number 202 on Rolling Stone's 2003 list of the 500 Greatest Albums of All Time and 203 in a 2012 revised list, Bad moved up to a ranking of 194 in a 2020 list. In NME's The 500 Greatest Albums of All Time list, Bad was ranked number 204. It was also included in the book titled 1001 Albums You Must Hear Before You Die. In 2009, VH1 listed Bad at number 43 on their list of 100 Greatest Albums of All Time of the MTV Generation. In 2012, Slant Magazine ranked Bad the 48th-best album of the 1980s. In 2017, Bad was named the best album of 1987 by Consequence of Sound. Billboard ranked Bad at number 138 on its list of the Greatest of All Time Billboard 200 Albums. It was ranked number 30 in Billboard's list of the Greatest of All Time R&B/Hip-Hop Albums, out of 100 albums. Billboard's critics ranked it the 41st best album on its list of all 92 Diamond-certified albums.

=== Accolades ===
Organization	Country	Accolade	Year	Source
Grammy Awards	United States	Best Engineered Recording – Non-Classical for Bruce Swedien (1988) and Best Music Video for "Leave Me Alone" (1990)	1988/90	
American Music Awards	United States	Favorite R&B Song for "Bad"	1988	
Billboard	United States	Spotlight Award	1988	
Quintessence Editions	United Kingdom	1001 Albums You Must Hear Before You Die	2003	
VH1	United States	100 Greatest Albums of All Time of the MTV Generation (Ranked No. 43)	2009	
NME	United Kingdom	The 500 Greatest Albums of All Time (Ranked No. 204)	2013	
Billboard	United States	Greatest of All Time Billboard 200 Albums (Ranked No. 138)	2015	
Rolling Stone	United States	500 Greatest Albums of All Time (Ranked No. 194)	2020	

== Legacy ==
=== Reappraisals ===
According to Jayson Rodriguez of MTV, following Off the Wall and Thriller was not an easy task, but Jackson's Bad was "formidable by all accounts". Rodriguez also felt that during the Bad era, Jackson's vocal hiccups and stammered "shamone" would become staples in his music that were "heightening and highlighting the emotion of his lyrics." In an article for The Root, Matthew Allen claimed that Bad was the start of Jackson's "three-year prime" in his vocals, songwriting, producing, performing and video output. Smooth Radio named Bad as Jackson's greatest album and credited the album for transforming Jackson into his peak as an entertainer. Ranked as the best album of 1987 by Consequence Of Sound, the publication asserts that Bad captured a "bigger, bolder, and far more vital" Jackson who emphasised important topics, including racial injustices and world peace.

In a retrospective review for BBC Music, Mike Diver regards Bad as a standout event of 1980s pop culture. According to Diver, it was an album that was popular in all record collections, from "rockers and poppers" to "punks and poets". Diver also praised the album for being the "best of the best [of its time]" and an "essential pop masterpiece". Newsweek credits Bad with defining the sound of pop music in the late 1980s, along with Madonna's Like a Prayer (1989) and Janet Jackson's Rhythm Nation 1814 (1989). Writing for Billboard, Gail Mitchell views Bad as one of the most important pop albums of the late 1980s, and one of the most successful albums in Billboard chart history. Jim Farber of the Daily News wrote that Bad took aspects of Off the Wall and Thriller to create Jackson's "most smooth work of pop to date". In 2025, Gina Wurtz of Screen Rant praised Bad: "Whatever the case, Bad remains an incredible album, whether the Grammys acknowledged it or not". VH1 said that the expectations for Bad were "ridiculously high", noting that there was also further hype after Jackson planned duets with the likes of Prince; Whitney Houston; Aretha Franklin and Barbra Streisand. VH1 credited Bad for being a "deeply personal project" for Jackson – he wrote nine of the 11 songs – and one that saw him gain further independence and debut a harder-edged look and sound.

"On Bad, Jackson's music is largely about creating moods, visceral emotions, and fantastical scenarios....[with] each song work[ing] as a dream capsule, inviting the listener into a vivid new sound, story, space."

— Journalist Joseph Vogel describing Bad

Like Thriller, Bad also improved the standard for innovation in music videos following the success of the music videos for "Bad", "Smooth Criminal" and "Leave Me Alone". The music video for "The Way You Make Me Feel" was also influential; the American rapper Ludacris, who featured in the Canadian singer Justin Bieber's hit song "Baby", said that the "Baby" music video was intended to be "a 2010 version" of "The Way You Make Me Feel". MTV noted that the choreography used "a few of Jackson's less-suggestive moves". A professor at Louisiana State University asserts that the "Bad" music video revolutionized the traditional understanding of masculinity, particularly amongst Black American men. According to the professor, Jackson embraced dominant hyper-aggressiveness, yet simultaneously challenged this traditional position by creating an alternative form of masculinity. Jackson emphasized a sense of optimism about the future and distorted conventional notions of sexuality by presenting a dual image: a masculine self, indicated by clothing that suggested toughness, alongside a feminine aspect, expressed through his effeminate hairstyle and use of make-up.

=== 21st-century appeal ===
Writing for The Quietus, David Bennun argues that Bad "changed pop music forever" and claims that in the decades since its release, "we have never ceased to hear things that sound like Bad", highlighting the likes of Usher, Justin Timberlake, and Bruno Mars as examples. Kendall Fisher of E! Online said Bad "epitomized the massive influence [Jackson] had on many of today's biggest artists".

Twenty-five years after its release, the filmmaker Spike Lee said that Bad sounds the "freshest" compared to other Billboard 200 chart-topping albums released in 1987, such as U2's The Joshua Tree, Bruce Springsteen's Tunnel of Love and Whitney Houston's Whitney: "Go to the charts ... and see what were the top albums 25 years ago, play those albums now and then play Bad, and then see which one still sounds fresh and doesn't sound dated." Reflecting in 2022, 35 years after its release, Marcus Floyd wrote for Renowned for Sound that "you can still hear why Bad was the singer's second best selling album [...] Bad will always be a fan favourite and one of Michael Jackson's most influential and ear-tantalising albums released over his extraordinary career."

The American musician Kanye West said that Jackson's outfit in the "Bad" video is "far more influential" than Jackson's outfit in the "Thriller" video. West also said "I almost dress like that [Jackson's outfit in the "Bad" video] today." In 2018, Jackson's worn jacket from the video sold for $298,000 at a New York auction, about three times its original asking price.

== Bad 25 ==
It was announced on May 3, 2012, that Jackson's estate and Epic Records would be releasing a 25th anniversary album of Bad. It was named Bad 25 and was released on September 18, 2012. Since the release of Bad 25, there has been a discontinuation of the 2001 special edition.

== Track listing ==
All tracks are written by Michael Jackson, except where noted.

Side one
No.	Title	Writer(s)	Length
1.	"Bad"		4:07
2.	"The Way You Make Me Feel"		4:58
3.	"Speed Demon"		4:02
4.	"Liberian Girl"		3:52
5.	"Just Good Friends" (featuring Stevie Wonder)	Terry Britten; Graham Lyle	4:07
Total length:			21:06

Side two
No.	Title	Writer(s)	Length
6.	"Another Part of Me"		3:54
7.	"Man in the Mirror"	Siedah Garrett; Glen Ballard	5:18
8.	"I Just Can't Stop Loving You" (featuring Siedah Garrett)		4:13
9.	"Dirty Diana"		4:40
10.	"Smooth Criminal"		4:17
Total length:			22:22 43:28

CD, digital, and 2001 cassette bonus track
No.	Title	Length
11.	"Leave Me Alone"	4:40
Total length:		48:08

== Personnel ==
Personnel as listed in the liner notes are:

- Lead and backing vocals: Michael Jackson
- Background vocals: Siedah Garrett (tracks 7–8), The Winans (7), and The Andraé Crouch Choir (7)
- Bass guitar: Nathan East (track 8)
- Hammond organ: Jimmy Smith (track 1)
- Drums: John Robinson (tracks 1–4, 9–10), Miko Brando (3), Ollie E. Brown (3, 5), Leon "Ndugu" Chancler (8), Bill Bottrell (10), Bruce Swedien (5, 10), Humberto Gatica (5)
- Drum programming: Douglas Getschal (tracks 1–4, 9), Cornelius Mims (5), Larry Williams (11)
- Guitar: David Williams (tracks 1–3, 6, 9–10), Eric Gale (2), Bill Bottrell (3), Michael Landau (5), Paul Jackson Jr. (6, 9, 11), Dann Huff (7–8), Steve Stevens (solo, 9)
- Trumpet: Gary Grant, Jerry Hey (tracks 1–3, 5–6, 10)
- Sounds engineered: Ken Caillat and Tom Jones
- Percussion: Paulinho da Costa (tracks 1–5, 8), Ollie E. Brown (2, 7)
- Keyboards: Stefan Stefanovic, Greg Phillinganes (track 7)
- Saxophone: Kim Hutchcroft (tracks 1–3, 5–6, 10), Larry Williams (1–2, 5–6, 10)
- Synclavier (tracks 1–6, 8–10), digital guitar (1), finger snaps (2), sound effects (3): Christopher Currell
- Synthesizer: John Barnes (tracks 1–4, 6, 9–10), Michael Boddicker (1–5, 9–10), Greg Phillinganes (1–3, 5, 8, 11, solo–1), Rhett Lawrence (5–6), David Paich (4, 8), Larry Williams (4–5, 11), Glen Ballard (7), Randy Kerber (7), Randy Waldman (9)
- Piano: John Barnes (track 8), Kevin Maloney (10)
- Rhythm arrangement: Michael Jackson (tracks 1–4, 6, 9–11), Quincy Jones (1, 3–5, 7–8), Christopher Currell (1), John Barnes (4, 6, 9–10), Graham Lyle (5), Terry Britten (5), Glen Ballard (7), Jerry Hey (9)
- Horn arrangement: Jerry Hey (tracks 1–3, 5–6, 10)
- Synthesizer Programming: Larry Williams (track 2), Eric Persing (3), Steve Porcaro (4, 8), Casey Young (11)
- Midi saxophone: Larry Williams (track 3)

== Charts ==
=== Weekly charts ===
Chart (1987–2026)	Peak position
Argentine Albums (CAPIF)	2
Australian Albums (Kent Music Report)	2
Austrian Albums (Ö3 Austria)	1
Belgian Albums (Ultratop Flanders)	16
Belgian Albums (Ultratop Wallonia)	12
Brazilian Albums (ABPD)	3
Canada Top Albums/CDs (RPM)	1
Croatian International Albums (HDU)	10
Czech Albums (ČNS IFPI)	3
Danish Albums (Hitlisten)	10
Dutch Albums (Album Top 100)	1
European Top 100 Albums (Music & Media)	1
Finnish Albums (Suomen virallinen albumilista)	1
French Albums (IFOP)	1
German Albums (Offizielle Top 100)	1
German Pop Albums (Offizielle Top 100)	5
Greek Albums (IFPI)	2
Hungarian Albums (MAHASZ)	7
Italian Albums (Musica e Dischi)	1
Japanese Albums (Oricon)	1
Lithuanian Albums (AGATA)	24
Mexican Albums (Top 100 Mexico)	13
New Zealand Albums (RMNZ)	1
Norwegian Albums (VG-lista)	1
Polish Albums (ZPAV)	4
Portuguese Albums (AFP)	15
Spanish Albums (AFYVE)	1
Swedish Albums (Sverigetopplistan)	1
Swiss Albums (Schweizer Hitparade)	1
UK Albums (Official Charts)	1
US Billboard 200	1
US Billboard Top R&B/Black Albums	1

=== Year-end charts ===
Chart (1987)	Position
Australian Albums (Kent Music Report)	16
Austrian Albums (Ö3 Austria)	17
Canada Top Albums/CDs (RPM)	14
European Albums (European Top 100 Albums)	1
French Albums (IFOP)	1
German Albums (Offizielle Top 100)	8
Japanese Albums (Oricon)	5
New Zealand Albums (RMNZ)	14
Swiss Albums (Schweizer Hitparade)	15
UK Albums (OCC)	1
US Cash Box	15

Chart (1988)	Position
Australian Albums (ARIA)	43
Austrian Albums (Ö3 Austria)	2
European Albums (European Top 100 Albums)	1
German Albums (Offizielle Top 100)	3
New Zealand Albums (RMNZ)	5
Swiss Albums (Schweizer Hitparade)	4
UK Albums (OCC)	3
US Billboard 200	5
US Top R&B/Black Albums (Billboard)	2
US Cash Box	6

Chart (2022)	Position
Belgian Albums (Ultratop Flanders)	148

Chart (2023)	Position
Belgian Albums (Ultratop Flanders)	184

Chart (2024)	Position
Belgian Albums (Ultratop Flanders)	199

Chart (2025)	Position
Belgian Albums (Ultratop Flanders)	172

=== Decade-end charts ===
Chart (1980–1989)	Position
Austrian Albums (Ö3 Austria Top 40)	4
UK Albums (OCC)	2

== Certifications and sales ==
Region	Certification	Certified units/sales
Australia (ARIA)	6× Platinum	420,000^{^}
Austria (IFPI Austria)	4× Platinum	200,000^{*}
Brazil sales as of 1991	—	1,000,000
Canada (Music Canada)	Diamond	1,000,000^{‡}
China	—	500,000
Denmark (IFPI Danmark)	5× Platinum	100,000^{‡}
Finland (Musiikkituottajat)	Gold	51,287
France (SNEP)	Diamond	1,400,000
Germany (BVMI)	4× Platinum	2,000,000^{^}
Hong Kong (IFPI Hong Kong)	Platinum	20,000^{*}
India	—	200,000
Ireland	—	120,000
Israel	Gold	20,000
Italy sales as of 1995	—	1,000,000
Italy (FIMI) sales + streams since 2009	3× Platinum	150,000^{‡}
Japan (RIAJ)	Gold	1,300,000
Mexico (AMPROFON)	Platinum+Gold	350,000^{^}
Netherlands (NVPI)	Platinum	500,000
New Zealand (RMNZ)	9× Platinum	135,000^{^}
Norway (IFPI Norway)	Platinum	100,000
Portugal (AFP)	Platinum	40,000^{^}
Singapore 1987 sales	—	30,000
Singapore (RIAS)	Gold	5,000^{*}
Spain (Promusicae)	3× Platinum	300,000^{^}
Sweden (GLF)	2× Platinum	200,000^{^}
Switzerland (IFPI Switzerland)	2× Platinum	100,000^{^}
Taiwan sales as of 2009	—	160,000
United Kingdom (BPI)	15× Platinum	4,500,000^{‡}
United States (RIAA)	11× Platinum	11,000,000^{‡}
Summaries
Europe 1987 sales	—	6,700,000
Europe (IFPI) For sales in 2009	Platinum	1,000,000^{*}
Worldwide 1987–1991 sales	—	25,000,000
Worldwide	—	35,000,000
^{*} Sales figures based on certification alone.^{^} Shipments figures based on certification alone.^{‡} Sales+streaming figures based on certification alone.

== Release history ==
Release dates and formats for Bad
Region	Date	Edition(s)	Format(s)	Label(s)	Ref.
United States	August 31, 1987	Standard	CD; LP; Cassette	Epic	
Various	October 16, 2001	Special Edition (re-issue)	CD	Epic; Legacy; Sony	
Various	September 18, 2012	Bad 25; 25th Anniversary	CD; LP; DVD; Digital download; Streaming	MJJ; Epic; Legacy	
Various	September 18, 2026	Audiophile Edition^{[a]}	Hybrid SACD; LP^{[b]}	Mobile Fidelity Sound Lab; MJJ; Epic	

Notes

- ^{^[a]} sourced from the original masters.
- ^{^[b]} includes the bonus track "Leave Me Alone" (left off original vinyl editions).

== See also ==
- List of best-selling albums
- List of best-selling albums in Austria
- List of best-selling albums in Brazil
- List of best-selling albums in China
- List of best-selling albums in France
- List of best-selling albums in Germany
- List of best-selling albums in Italy
- List of best-selling albums in the United Kingdom
- List of best-selling albums in the United States
- List of diamond-certified albums in Canada
- List of Top 25 albums for 1987 in Australia
- List of Billboard 200 number-one albums of 1987
- List of number-one albums of 1987 (Canada)
- List of number-one albums from the 1980s (New Zealand)
- List of UK Albums Chart number ones of the 1980s
- List of most expensive albums
- Michael Jackson albums discography

== Print sources ==
- Appel, Stacey (2012). Michael Jackson Style. Omnibus Press. ISBN 978-0-85712-787-7.
- Bogle, Donald (2016). Elizabeth and Michael. Simon and Schuster. ISBN 978-1-4516-7699-0.
- Campbell, Lisa D. (1993). Michael Jackson: The King of Pop. Branden Books. ISBN 978-0-8283-1957-7.
- Cashmore, Ellis (2022). The Destruction and Creation of Michael Jackson. Bloomsbury Publishing. ISBN 978-1-5013-6356-6.
- Brooks, Darren (2002). Michael Jackson: An Exceptional Journey. Chrome Dreams. ISBN 1-84240-178-5.
- DeMello, Margo (2012). Faces Around the World. Bloomsbury Publishing. ISBN 978-1-59884-618-8.
- Garland-Thomson, Rosemarie (1996). Freakery: Cultural Spectacles of the Extraordinary Body. NYU Press. ISBN 978-0-8147-8222-4.
- Greenburg, Zack O'Malley (2014). Michael Jackson, Inc. Simon and Schuster. ISBN 978-1-4767-0596-5.
- Hegde, Radha Sarma (2011). Circuits of Visibility. NYU Press. ISBN 978-0-8147-4468-0.
- Lecocq, Richard; Allard, François (2018). "Bad". Michael Jackson All the Songs: The Story Behind Every Track. Cassell. ISBN 978-1-78840-057-2. Archived from the original on February 23, 2023.
- Jones, Jel D. Lewis (2005). Michael Jackson, The King of Pop: The Big Picture : The Music! The Man! The Legend! The Interviews : An Anthology. Amber Books Publishing. ISBN 978-0-9749779-0-4.
- Knopper, Steve (2016). MJ: The Genius of Michael Jackson. Simon and Schuster. ISBN 978-1-4767-3038-7.
- O'Toole, Kit (2015). Michael Jackson FAQ. Bloomsbury Publishing. ISBN 978-1-4950-4599-8.
- Richards, Matt; Langthorne, Mark (2015). 83 Minutes. Bonnier Publishing. ISBN 978-1-910536-22-3.
- Shepherd, John; Horn, David (2012). Continuum Encyclopedia of Popular Music of the World Volume 8. Bloomsbury Publishing. ISBN 978-1-4411-6078-2.
- Smallcombe, Mike (2016). Making Michael. Clink Street Publishing. ISBN 978-1-910782-51-4.
- Smit, Christopher (2017). Michael Jackson. Taylor & Francis. ISBN 978-1-351-55834-1.
- Wallace, Michele (2016). Invisibility Blues. Verso Books. ISBN 978-1-78663-195-4.
