= List of RPM number-one adult contemporary singles of 1987 =

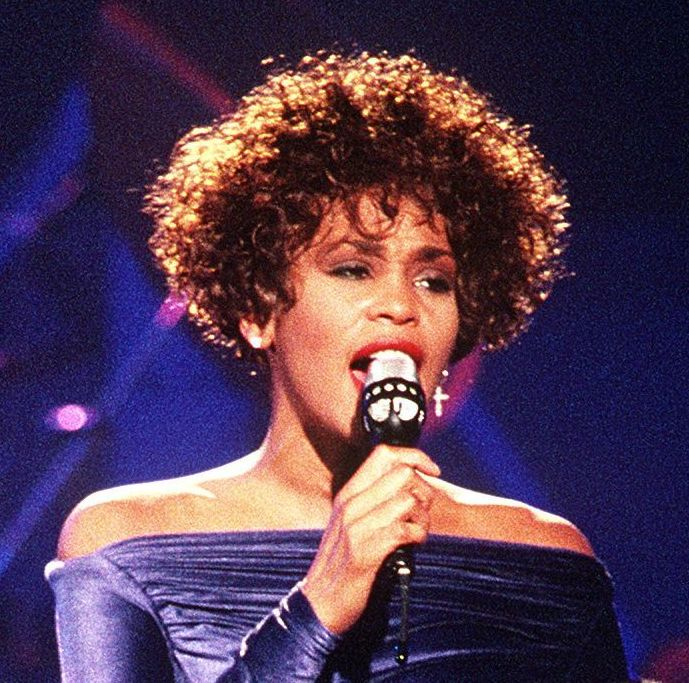
Whitney Houston spent the most weeks at number one on the Canadian adult contemporary chart, totalling 10 weeks, including eight weeks with "I Wanna Dance with Somebody (Who Loves Me)"

RPM was a Canadian music industry magazine that published the best-performing singles charts in Canada from 1964 to 2000. In 1987, RPM published a chart for top-performing singles played in adult contemporary radio stations in Canada. The chart, entitled Adult Contemporary, undergone numerous name changes throughout its existence, becoming Adult Contemporary in August 1984, and later as Adult Contemporary Tracks until the magazine's final publication in November 2000. In 1987, twenty-six individual songs topped the chart, which contained 30 positions and is based on record sales and adult contemporary radio airplay.

In RPM's first issue for 1987, the first adult contemporary number-one was Billy Ocean's "Love Is Forever", continuing from its initial number-one run on the final week of December 1986, until it was knocked off the top of the chart by Billy Joel's "This Is the Time", which was number one for the last two weeks of January. The third chart-topper of 1987 was Corey Hart's cover version of Elvis Presley's 1961 hit single "Can't Help Falling in Love", which topped the chart the first week of February after its number-one run on the top 40 on the last week of January, becoming the only adult contemporary single by a Canadian to reach number one for the year. "Can't Help Falling in Love" would later be replaced at number one by Lionel Richie's "Ballerina Girl", which topped the chart for the two weeks until being replaced itself by "At This Moment" by Billy Vera & the Beaters. The longest chart run for the year was held by "I Wanna Dance with Somebody (Who Loves Me)" by Whitney Houston, which topped the chart for eight consecutive weeks between June and August, until it was later replaced on the top by "Moonlighting" by Al Jarreau, which was then replaced by "Alone" by Heart, "Meet Me Half Way" by Kenny Loggins and "La Bamba" by Los Lobos. Houston would have a second number-one for 1987, with "Didn't We Almost Have It All", which topped the chart for the first half of October, until being dethroned by Dan Fogelberg's "Lonely in Love", and later by Kenny G's "Don't Make Me Wait for Love", Carly Simon's "The Stuff That Dreams Are Made Of" and Bruce Springsteen's "Brilliant Disguise". The final adult-contemporary number-one single of 1987 was George Michael's solo single "Faith", which held the top position for the remainder of December after replacing Elton John's live single "Candle in the Wind" following a week at number one.

== Chart history ==
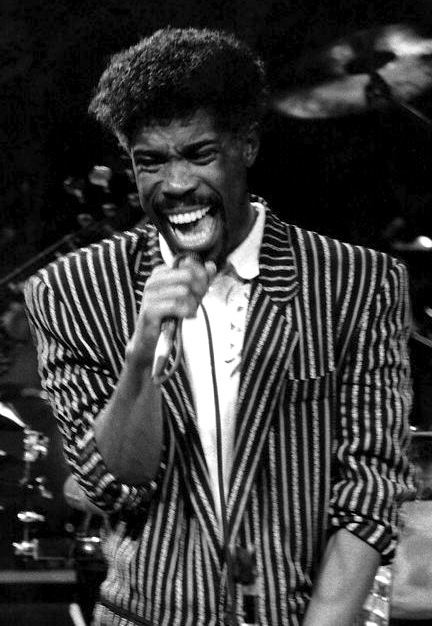
Billy Ocean began the year at number one with "Love Is Forever".

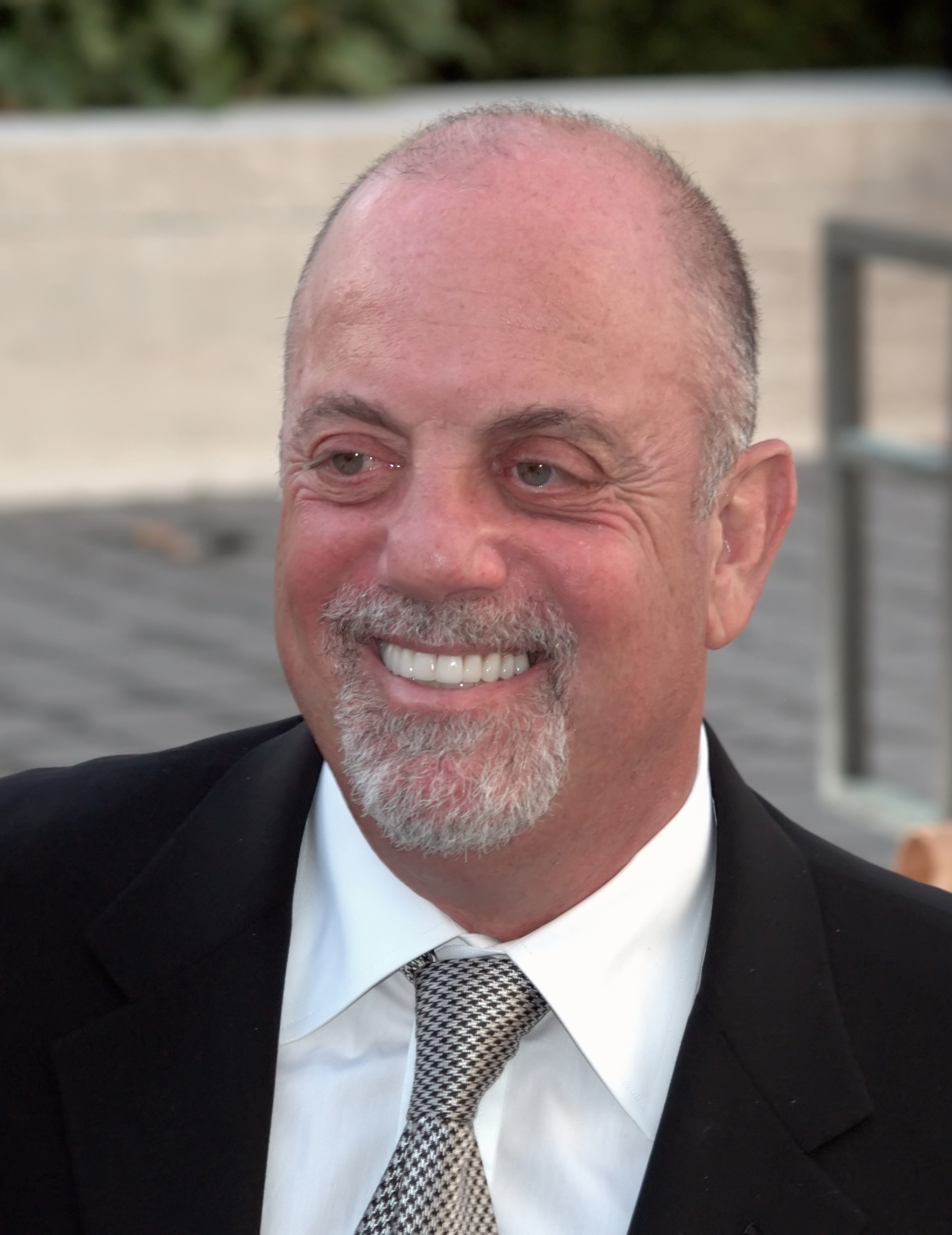
Billy Joel (pictured in 2009) had two Canadian adult-contemporary number-one hits with "This Is the Time" and "Baby Grand" (with Ray Charles)

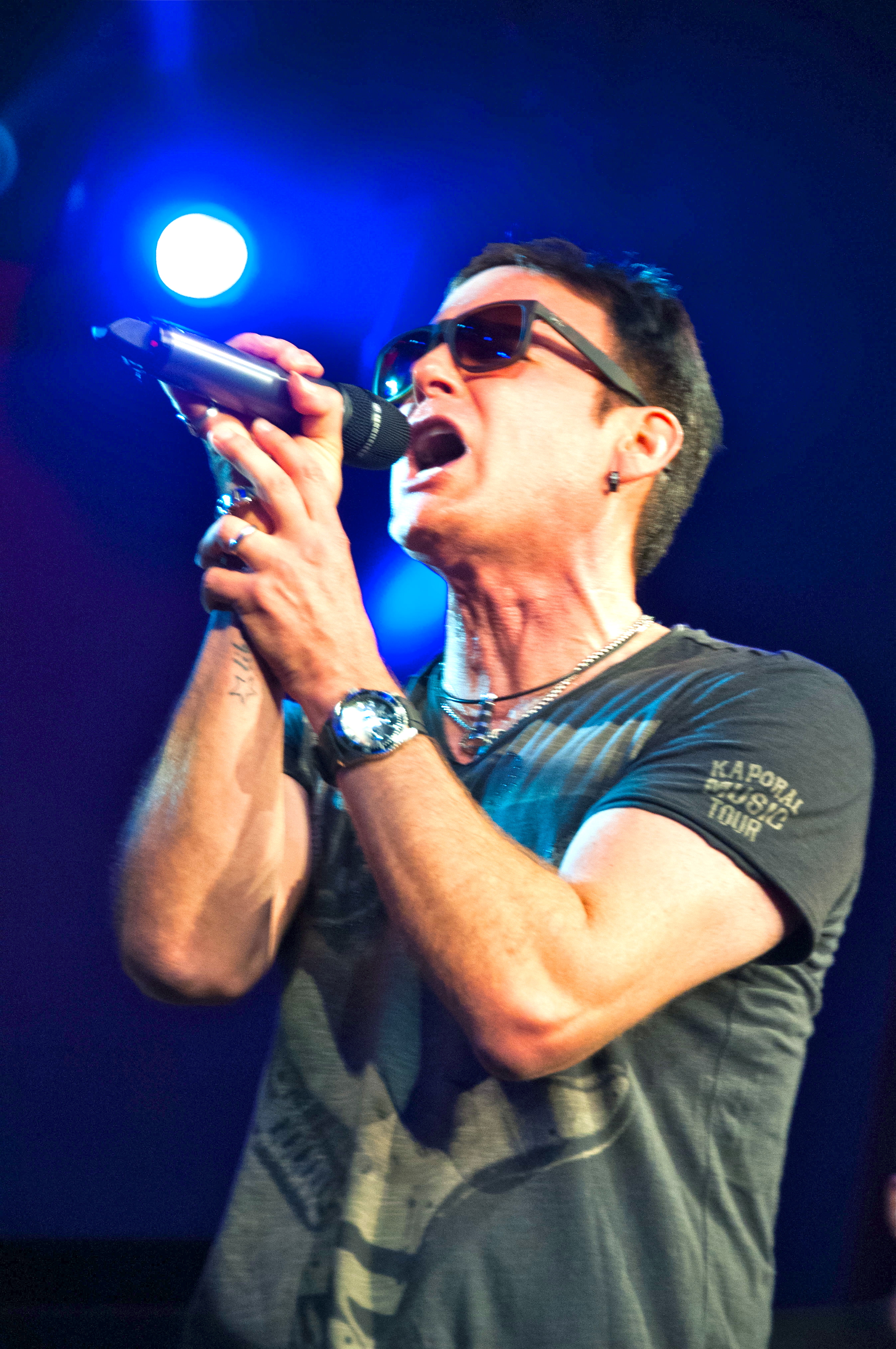
Corey Hart was the only Canadian artist to top the chart with his version of "Can't Help Falling in Love".

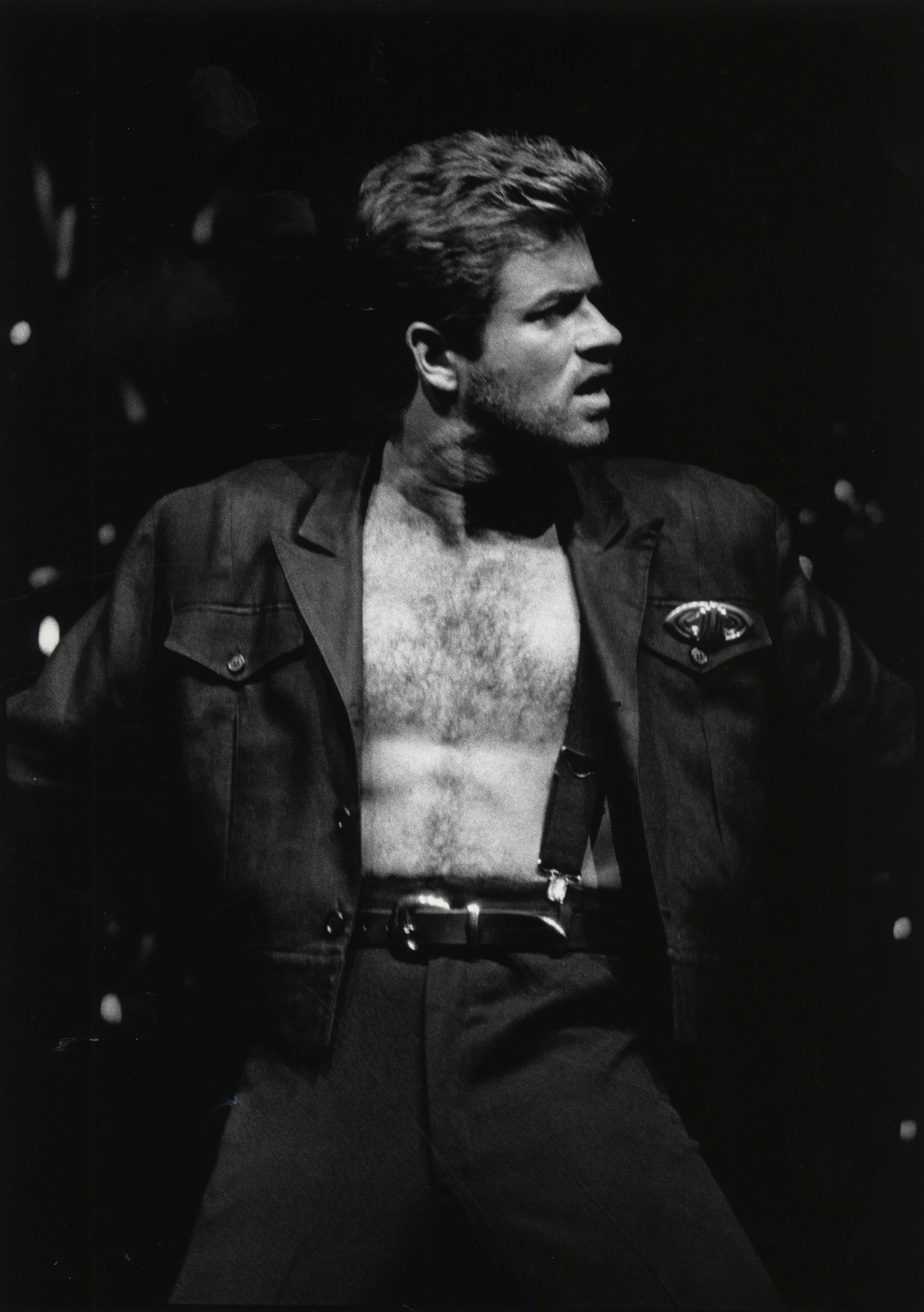
George Michael ended the year at number one with "Faith".

Chart history
Issue date	Title	Artist(s)	Ref.
January 3 (Note: Due to a two-week break in publication for the 1986/1987 Christmas and New Year period, the weeks of January 3 and 10 are inferred.)	"Love Is Forever"	Billy Ocean	
January 10*	"Love Is Forever"	Billy Ocean	
January 17	"Love Is Forever"	Billy Ocean	
January 24	"This Is the Time"	Billy Joel	
January 31	"This Is the Time"	Billy Joel	
February 7	"Can't Help Falling in Love"	Corey Hart	
February 14	"Ballerina Girl"	Lionel Richie	
February 21	"Ballerina Girl"	Lionel Richie	
February 28	"At This Moment"	Billy Vera & the Beaters	
March 7	"Ain't No Cure for Love"	Jennifer Warnes	
March 14	"Will You Still Love Me?"	Chicago	
March 21	"Mandolin Rain"	Bruce Hornsby & the Range	
March 28	"Mandolin Rain"	Bruce Hornsby & the Range	
April 4	"Let's Wait Awhile"	Janet Jackson	
April 11	"Let's Wait Awhile"	Janet Jackson	
April 18	"Nothing's Gonna Stop Us Now"	Starship	
April 25	"Nothing's Gonna Stop Us Now"	Starship	
May 2	"To Know Him Is to Love Him"	Dolly Parton, Linda Ronstadt and Emmylou Harris	
May 9	"To Know Him Is to Love Him"	Dolly Parton, Linda Ronstadt and Emmylou Harris	
May 16	"Baby Grand"	Billy Joel and Ray Charles	
May 23	"Baby Grand"	Billy Joel and Ray Charles	
May 30	"La Isla Bonita"	Madonna	
June 6	"La Isla Bonita"	Madonna	
June 13	"Say Goodbye to All"	Chris de Burgh	
June 20	"I Wanna Dance with Somebody (Who Loves Me)"	Whitney Houston	
June 27	"I Wanna Dance with Somebody (Who Loves Me)"	Whitney Houston	
July 4	"I Wanna Dance with Somebody (Who Loves Me)"	Whitney Houston	
July 11	"I Wanna Dance with Somebody (Who Loves Me)"	Whitney Houston	
July 18	"I Wanna Dance with Somebody (Who Loves Me)"	Whitney Houston	
July 25	"I Wanna Dance with Somebody (Who Loves Me)"	Whitney Houston	
August 1	"I Wanna Dance with Somebody (Who Loves Me)"	Whitney Houston	
August 8	"I Wanna Dance with Somebody (Who Loves Me)"	Whitney Houston	
August 15	"Moonlighting (Theme)"	Al Jarreau	
August 22	"Alone"	Heart	
August 29	"Meet Me Half Way"	Kenny Loggins	
September 5	"La Bamba"	Los Lobos	
September 12	"La Bamba"	Los Lobos	
September 19	"La Bamba"	Los Lobos	
September 26	"I Just Can't Stop Loving You"	Michael Jackson featuring Siedah Garrett	
October 3	"I Just Can't Stop Loving You"	Michael Jackson featuring Siedah Garrett	
October 10	"Didn't We Almost Have It All"	Whitney Houston	
October 17	"Didn't We Almost Have It All"	Whitney Houston	
October 24	"Lonely in Love"	Dan Fogelberg	
October 31	"The Stuff That Dreams Are Made Of"	Carly Simon	
November 7	"Don't Make Me Wait for Love"	Kenny G featuring Lenny Williams	
November 14	"Don't Make Me Wait for Love"	Kenny G featuring Lenny Williams	
November 21	"Brilliant Disguise"	Bruce Springsteen	
November 28	"Brilliant Disguise"	Bruce Springsteen	
December 5	"Candle in the Wind" (Live 1986)	Elton John	
December 12	"Faith"	George Michael	
December 18	"Faith"	George Michael	
December 26	"Faith"	George Michael	
