= List of number 1 albums of 1987 (Canada) =

These are the Canadian number 1 albums of 1987. The charts were compiled and published by RPM every Saturday.

== Chart-topping albums ==
†	This indicates the best performing album of the year

Issue date	Album	Artist	Ref
January 3	Live/1975-85	Bruce Springsteen & The E Street Band	
January 10	Live/1975-85	Bruce Springsteen & The E Street Band	
January 17	Graceland	Paul Simon	
January 24	Graceland	Paul Simon	
January 31	Graceland	Paul Simon	
February 7	Graceland	Paul Simon	
February 14	Graceland	Paul Simon	
February 21	Slippery When Wet	Bon Jovi	
February 28	Slippery When Wet	Bon Jovi	
March 7	Slippery When Wet	Bon Jovi	
March 14	Slippery When Wet	Bon Jovi	
March 21	Slippery When Wet	Bon Jovi	
March 28	Slippery When Wet	Bon Jovi	
April 4	Slippery When Wet	Bon Jovi	
April 11	The Joshua Tree †	U2	
April 18	The Joshua Tree †	U2	
April 25	The Joshua Tree †	U2	
May 2	The Joshua Tree †	U2	
May 9	The Joshua Tree †	U2	
May 16	The Joshua Tree †	U2	
May 23	The Joshua Tree †	U2	
May 30	The Joshua Tree †	U2	
June 6	The Joshua Tree †	U2	
June 13	The Joshua Tree †	U2	
June 20	The Joshua Tree †	U2	
June 27	Whitney	Whitney Houston	
July 4	Whitney	Whitney Houston	
July 11	Whitney	Whitney Houston	
July 18	Whitney	Whitney Houston	
July 25	Whitney	Whitney Houston	
August 1	Whitney	Whitney Houston	
August 8	Whitney	Whitney Houston	
August 15	Whitney	Whitney Houston	
August 22	Whitney	Whitney Houston	
August 29	Whitney	Whitney Houston	
September 5	Whitney	Whitney Houston	
September 12	La Bamba	Soundtrack	
September 19	La Bamba	Soundtrack	
September 26	La Bamba	Soundtrack	
October 3	Bad	Michael Jackson	
October 10	Bad	Michael Jackson	
October 17	La Bamba	Soundtrack	
October 24	La Bamba	Soundtrack	
October 31	Tunnel of Love	Bruce Springsteen	
November 7	Tunnel of Love	Bruce Springsteen	
November 14	Tunnel of Love	Bruce Springsteen	
November 21	Vital Idol	Billy Idol	
November 28	Vital Idol	Billy Idol	
December 5	The Lonesome Jubilee	John Cougar Mellencamp	
December 12	The Lonesome Jubilee	John Cougar Mellencamp	
December 19	The Lonesome Jubilee	John Cougar Mellencamp	
December 26	A Very Special Christmas	various artists	

== See also ==
- List of Canadian number-one singles of 1987
