= List of number-one singles of 1987 (Canada) =

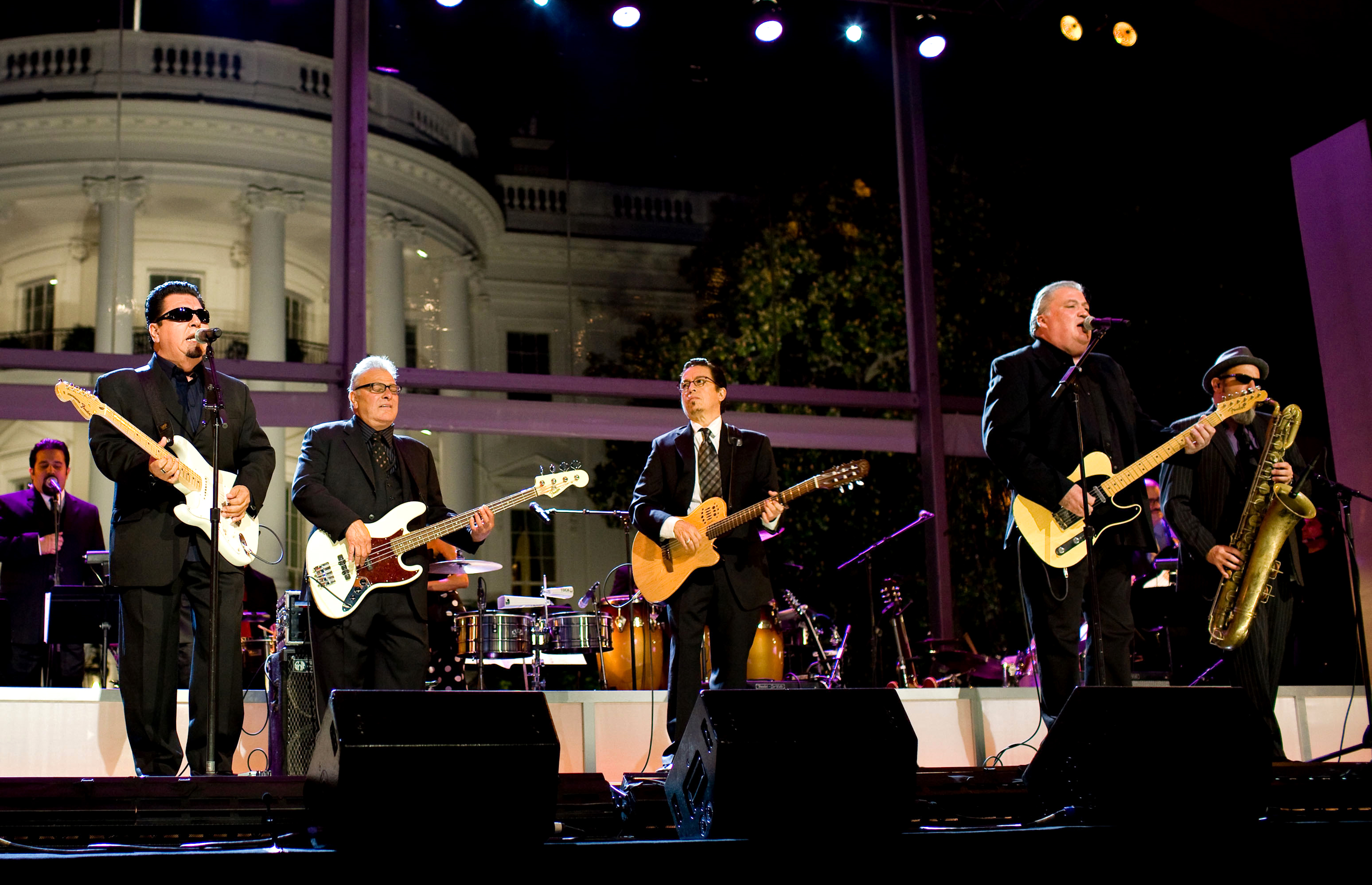
American rock band Los Lobos spent seven weeks at number one with their version of "La Bamba", the most successful record of the year.

RPM was a Canadian magazine that published the best-performing singles of Canada from 1964 to 2000. During 1987, thirty-one different songs reached number one. Bruce Hornsby and the Range achieved the first number-one single of the year, "The Way It Is", while George Michael became the final musician to peak at the top spot during the year with "Faith". Of the thirty-one musical acts that earned a number-one single, twenty-two of them reached number one for the first time; those who had previously topped the listing were Corey Hart, Starship, Madonna, Whitney Houston, Atlantic Starr, Bob Seger, Billy Idol, Jennifer Warnes, and George Michael. The only Canadian who reached the summit this year was Corey Hart.

The longest-running chart-topper and most successful track of the year was Los Lobos's cover of "La Bamba", which spent seven weeks at number one from 5 September to 17 October. Madonna was the only artist to peak at number one with multiple singles: "La Isla Bonita" and "Who's That Girl", which remained at the top for a week each. Billy Idol obtained the second-most weeks at number one in 1987—four—with his live rendition of "Mony Mony" while Club Nouveau and Cutting Crew each spent three issues at the top with "Lean on Me" and "(I Just) Died in Your Arms", respectively.

Key
† Indicates best-performing single of 1987

== Chart history ==
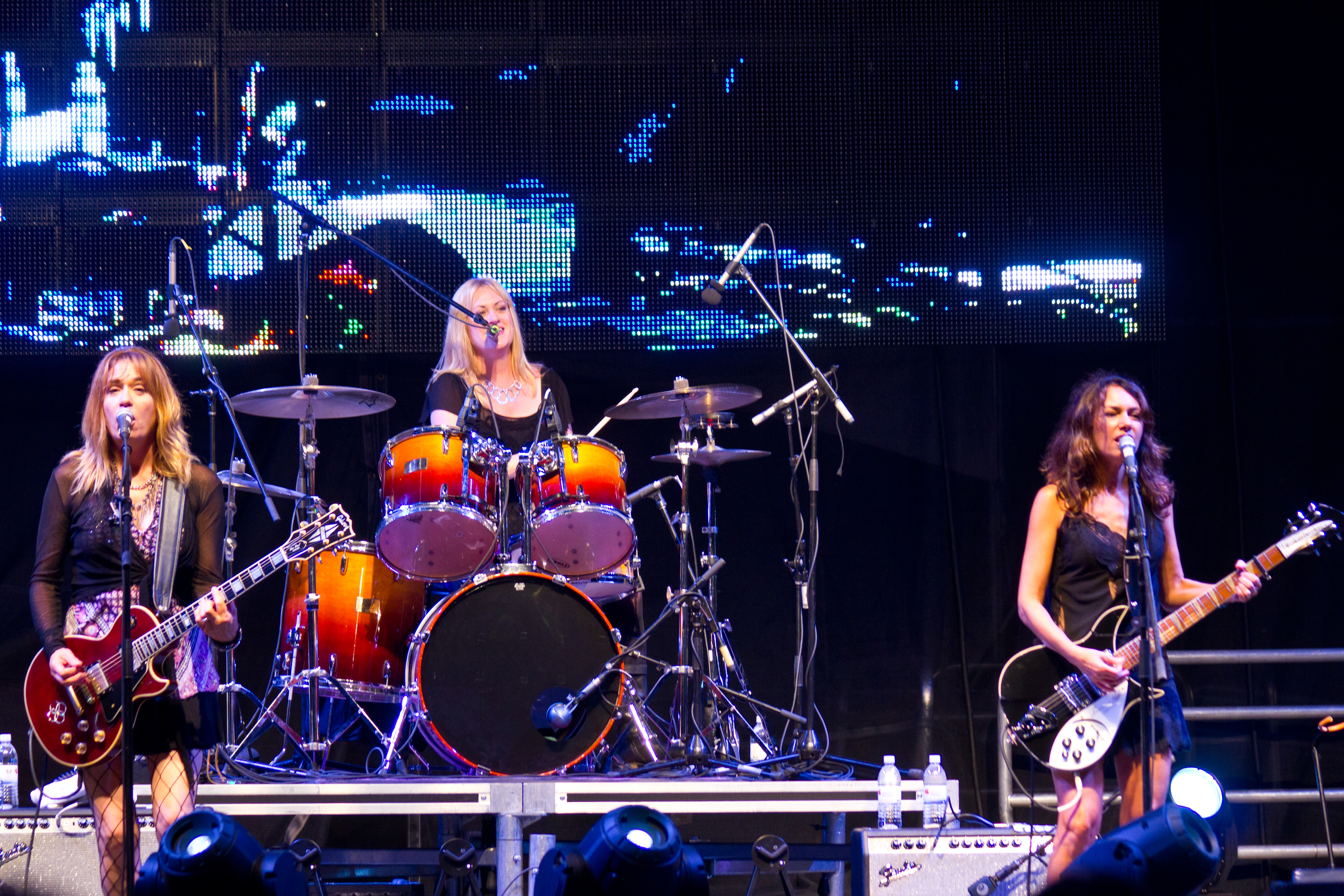
Pop rock band the Bangles reached number one in January with their song "Walk Like an Egyptian".

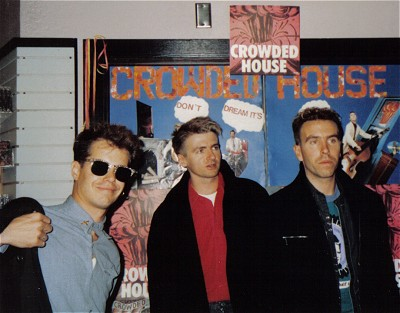
Australasian band Crowded House ascended to number one in May with "Don't Dream It's Over".

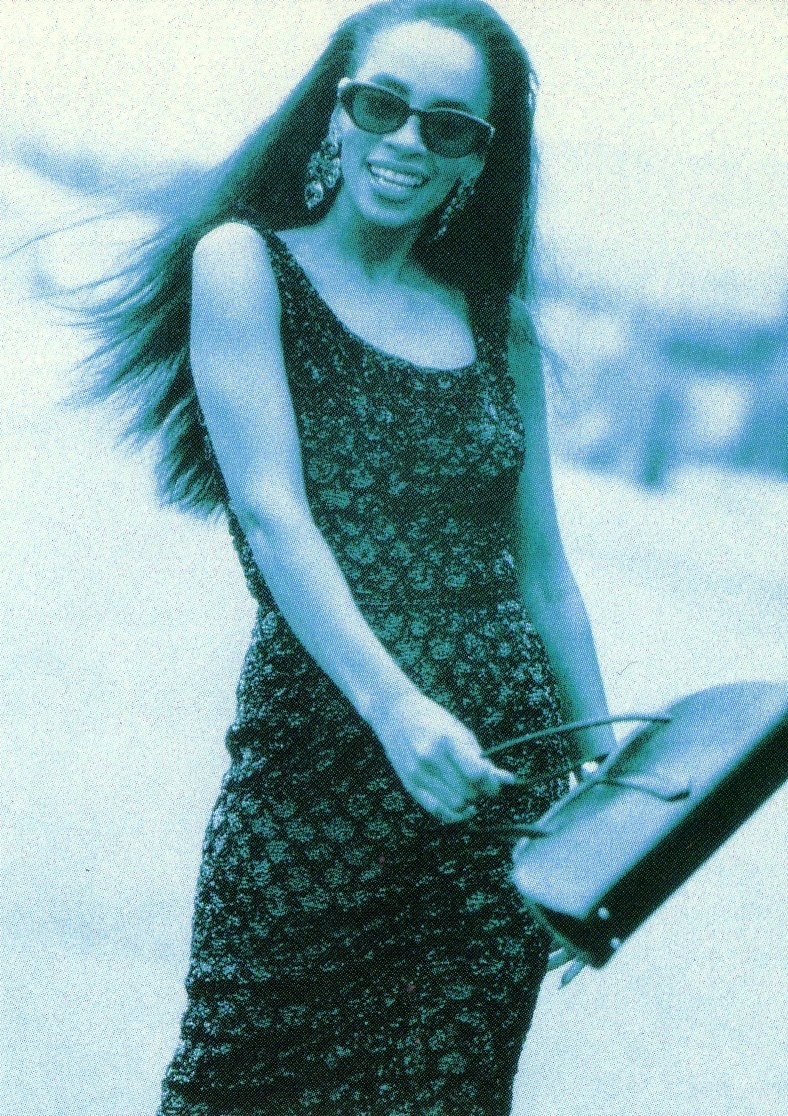
"Looking for a New Love" gave Jody Watley a Canadian number-one hit when it topped the RPM chart in June.

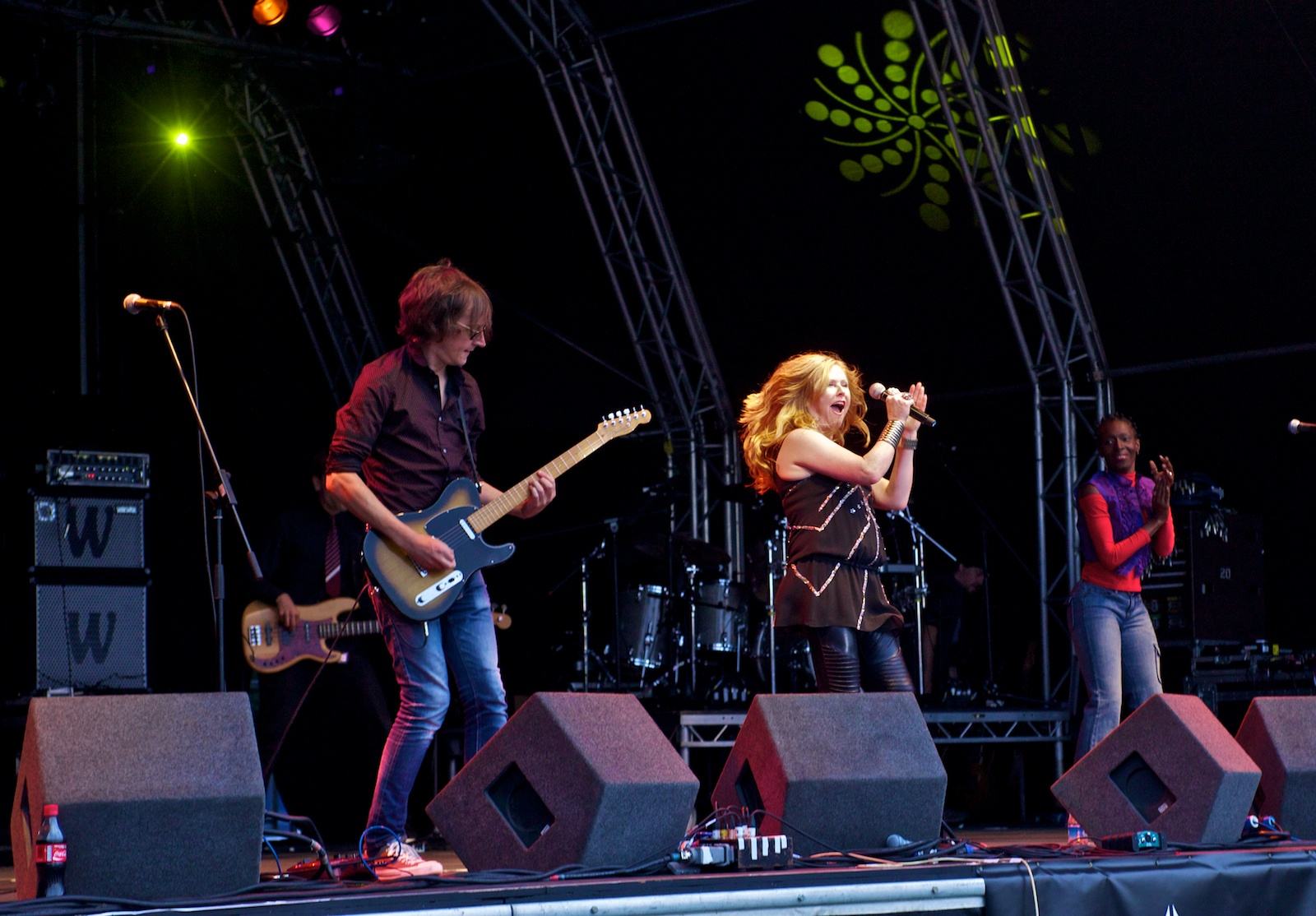
English rock band T'Pau obtained a number-one hit in August with "Heart and Soul".

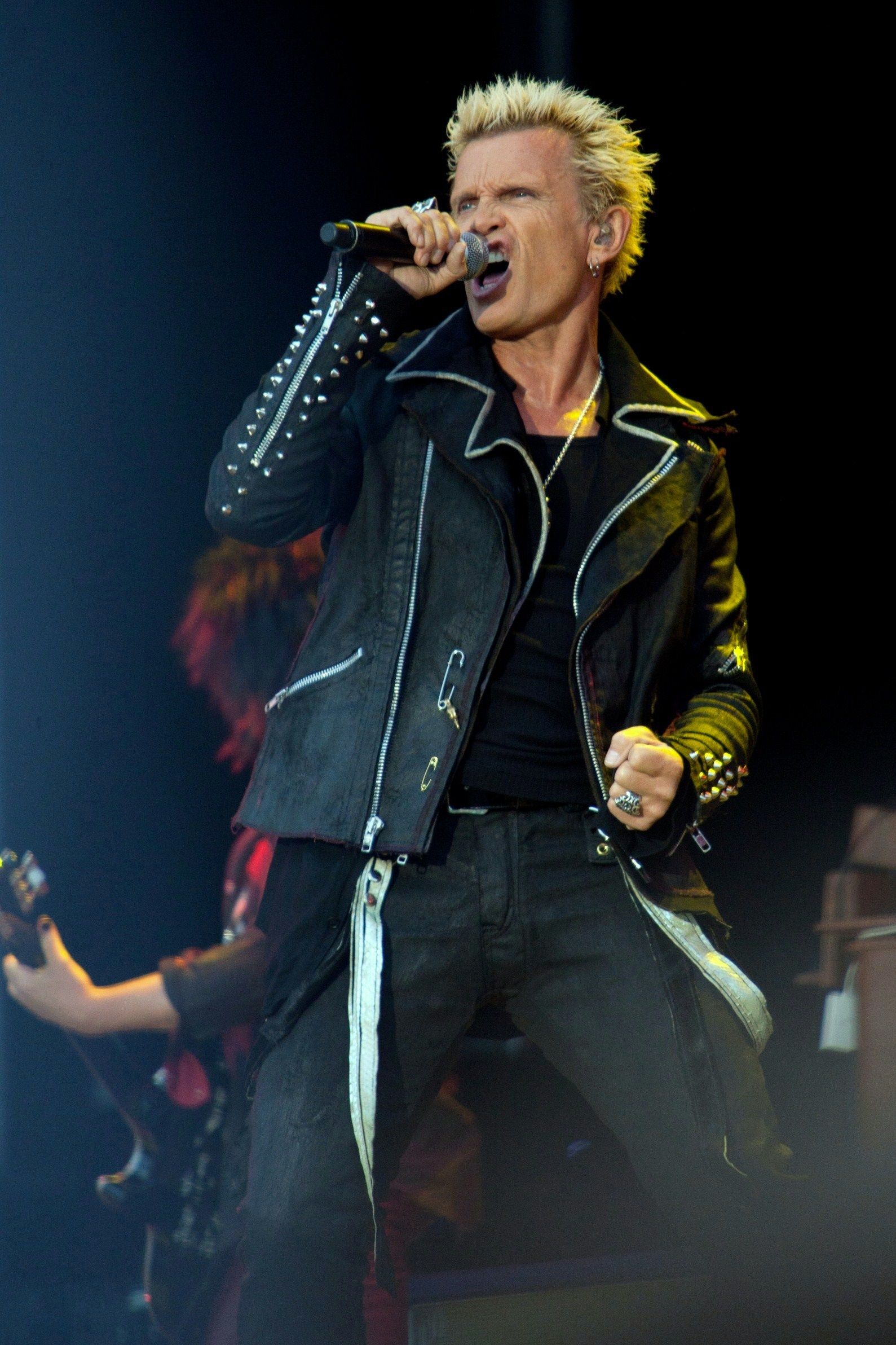
Billy Idol's live recording of "Mony Mony" spent four weeks at number one in October and November.

Issue date	Song	Artist	Reference
3 January (Note: Due to a two-week break in publication over the 1986/1987 New Year period, the weeks of 3 January and 10 January are inferred.)	"The Way It Is"	Bruce Hornsby and the Range	
10 January	"The Way It Is"	Bruce Hornsby and the Range	
17 January	"Everybody Have Fun Tonight"	Wang Chung	
24 January	"Walk Like an Egyptian"	The Bangles	
31 January	"Can't Help Falling in Love"	Corey Hart	
7 February	"C'est la Vie"	Robbie Nevil	
14 February	"At This Moment"	Billy Vera & The Beaters	
21 February	"At This Moment"	Billy Vera & The Beaters	
28 February	"Touch Me (I Want Your Body)"	Samantha Fox	
7 March	"Touch Me (I Want Your Body)"	Samantha Fox	
14 March	"Livin' on a Prayer"	Bon Jovi	
21 March	"Livin' on a Prayer"	Bon Jovi	
28 March	"Nothing's Gonna Stop Us Now"	Starship	
4 April	"Nothing's Gonna Stop Us Now"	Starship	
11 April	"Lean on Me"	Club Nouveau	
18 April	"Lean on Me"	Club Nouveau	
25 April	"Lean on Me"	Club Nouveau	
2 May	"Don't Dream It's Over"	Crowded House	
9 May	"With or Without You"	U2	
16 May	"(I Just) Died in Your Arms"	Cutting Crew	
23 May	"(I Just) Died in Your Arms"	Cutting Crew	
30 May	"(I Just) Died in Your Arms"	Cutting Crew	
6 June	"La Isla Bonita"	Madonna	
13 June	"Looking for a New Love"	Jody Watley	
20 June	"Nothing's Gonna Change My Love for You"	Glenn Medeiros	
27 June	"You Keep Me Hangin' On"	Kim Wilde	
4 July	"I Wanna Dance with Somebody (Who Loves Me)"	Whitney Houston	
11 July	"Always"	Atlantic Starr	
18 July	"Always"	Atlantic Starr	
25 July	"Head to Toe"	Lisa Lisa and Cult Jam	
1 August	"Shakedown"	Bob Seger	
8 August	"Alone"	Heart	
15 August	"Funkytown"	Pseudo Echo	
22 August	"Heart and Soul"	T'Pau	
29 August	"Who's That Girl"	Madonna	
5 September	"La Bamba"†	Los Lobos	
12 September	"La Bamba"†	Los Lobos	
19 September	"La Bamba"†	Los Lobos	
26 September	"La Bamba"†	Los Lobos	
3 October	"La Bamba"†	Los Lobos	
10 October	"La Bamba"†	Los Lobos	
17 October	"La Bamba"†	Los Lobos	
24 October	"Here I Go Again"	Whitesnake	
31 October	"Mony Mony"	Billy Idol	
7 November	"Mony Mony"	Billy Idol	
14 November	"Mony Mony"	Billy Idol	
21 November	"Mony Mony"	Billy Idol	
28 November	"I Think We're Alone Now"	Tiffany	
5 December	"I Think We're Alone Now"	Tiffany	
12 December	"(I've Had) The Time of My Life"	Bill Medley and Jennifer Warnes	
19 December	"Faith"	George Michael	
26 December	"Faith"	George Michael	

== See also ==
- 1987 in music
- List of number-one albums of 1987 (Canada)
- List of RPM number-one adult contemporary singles of 1987
- List of RPM number-one country singles of 1987
- List of Billboard Hot 100 number ones of 1987
- List of Cashbox Top 100 number-one singles of 1987
