= List of Billboard 200 number 1 albums of 1987 =

The highest-selling albums and EPs in the United States are ranked in the Billboard 200, which is published by Billboard magazine. The data are compiled by Nielsen Soundscan based on each album's weekly physical and digital sales. In 1987, a total 9 albums reached the number one position.

The beginning of the year started with the continuation of the end of last year's number one album, Live 1975-85 by Bruce Springsteen, but was quickly overtaken by Bon Jovi, and Slippery When Wet, which returned to the top spot, and became their first number one album. Whitney Houston scored her second #1 with Whitney, which had the longest run among the releases, spending 11 consecutive weeks at the top. The album became the first by a female artist ever to debut at #1 in the Billboard 200, and produced a then-record-equaling four #1 singles from one album; which was broken two months later when Michael Jackson's Bad produced five number ones. Whitney is one of only nine albums in music history to produce at least four #1 Hot 100 hits from the same album. Both U2 and Beastie Boys gained their first number one albums, with The Joshua Tree, and Licensed to Ill.

== Chart history ==
Key
†	Indicates best performing album of 1987

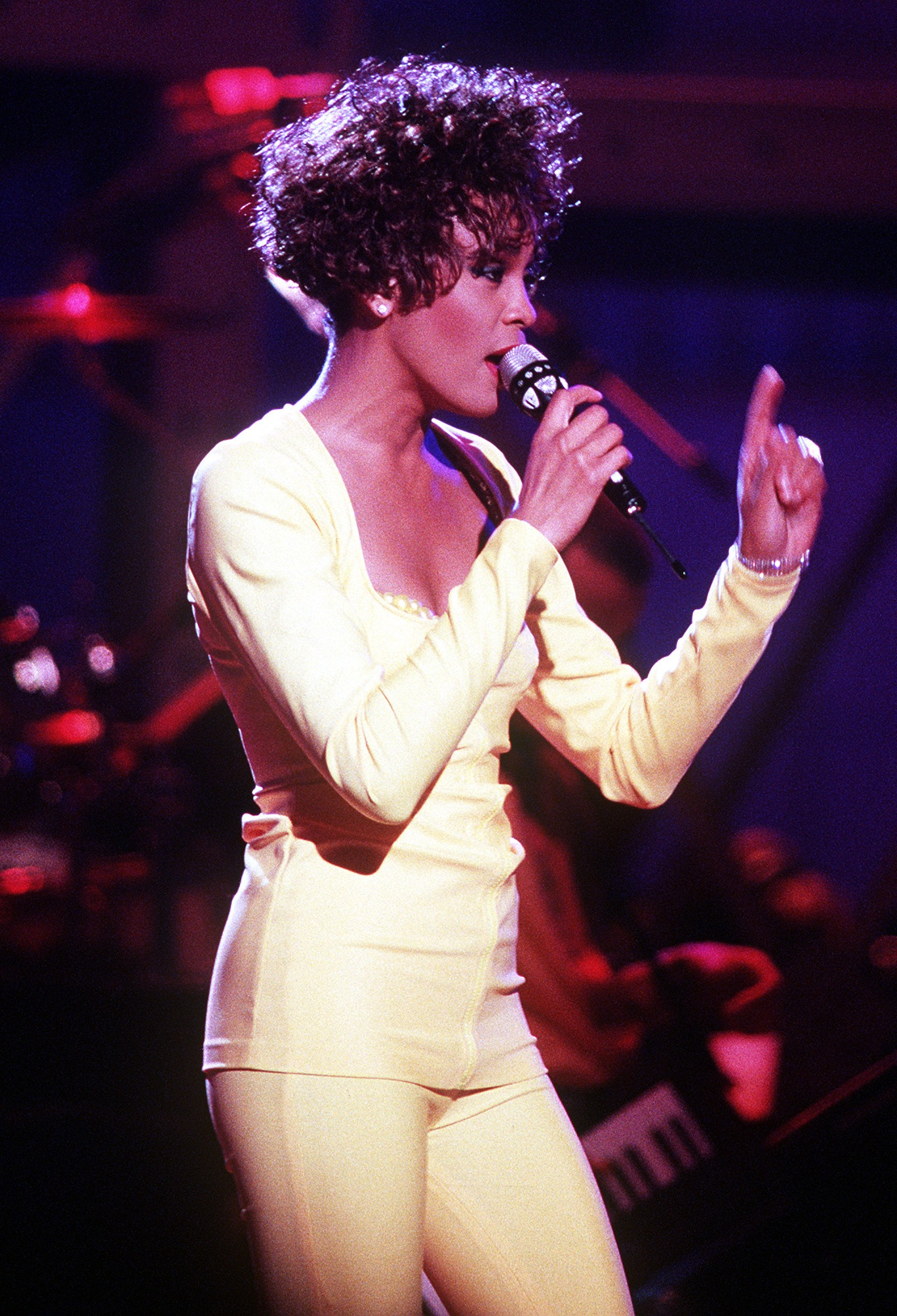
Whitney became Whitney Houston's second album to top the Billboard 200 and the first album by a female artist to debut at number 1.

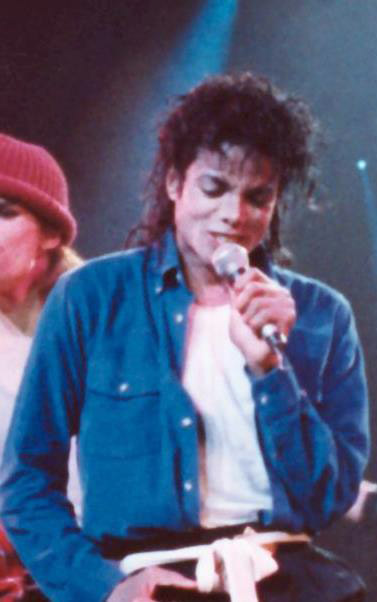
Bad became Michael Jackson's second Billboard 200 number one album.

Issue date	Album	Artist(s)	Label	Ref.
January 3	Live/1975–85	Bruce Springsteen & The E Street Band	Columbia	
January 10	Live/1975–85	Bruce Springsteen & The E Street Band	Columbia	
January 17	Slippery When Wet †	Bon Jovi	Mercury	
January 24	Slippery When Wet †	Bon Jovi	Mercury	
January 31	Slippery When Wet †	Bon Jovi	Mercury	
February 7	Slippery When Wet †	Bon Jovi	Mercury	
February 14	Slippery When Wet †	Bon Jovi	Mercury	
February 21	Slippery When Wet †	Bon Jovi	Mercury	
February 28	Slippery When Wet †	Bon Jovi	Mercury	
March 7	Licensed to Ill	Beastie Boys	Def Jam	
March 14	Licensed to Ill	Beastie Boys	Def Jam	
March 21	Licensed to Ill	Beastie Boys	Def Jam	
March 28	Licensed to Ill	Beastie Boys	Def Jam	
April 4	Licensed to Ill	Beastie Boys	Def Jam	
April 11	Licensed to Ill	Beastie Boys	Def Jam	
April 18	Licensed to Ill	Beastie Boys	Def Jam	
April 25	The Joshua Tree	U2	Island	
May 2	The Joshua Tree	U2	Island	
May 9	The Joshua Tree	U2	Island	
May 16	The Joshua Tree	U2	Island	
May 23	The Joshua Tree	U2	Island	
May 30	The Joshua Tree	U2	Island	
June 6	The Joshua Tree	U2	Island	
June 13	The Joshua Tree	U2	Island	
June 20	The Joshua Tree	U2	Island	
June 27	Whitney	Whitney Houston	Arista	
July 4	Whitney	Whitney Houston	Arista	
July 11	Whitney	Whitney Houston	Arista	
July 18	Whitney	Whitney Houston	Arista	
July 25	Whitney	Whitney Houston	Arista	
August 1	Whitney	Whitney Houston	Arista	
August 8	Whitney	Whitney Houston	Arista	
August 15	Whitney	Whitney Houston	Arista	
August 22	Whitney	Whitney Houston	Arista	
August 29	Whitney	Whitney Houston	Arista	
September 5	Whitney	Whitney Houston	Arista	
September 12	La Bamba	Los Lobos / Soundtrack	Slash	
September 19	La Bamba	Los Lobos / Soundtrack	Slash	
September 26	Bad	Michael Jackson	Epic	
October 3	Bad	Michael Jackson	Epic	
October 10	Bad	Michael Jackson	Epic	
October 17	Bad	Michael Jackson	Epic	
October 24	Bad	Michael Jackson	Epic	
October 31	Bad	Michael Jackson	Epic	
November 7	Tunnel of Love	Bruce Springsteen	Columbia	
November 14	Dirty Dancing	Soundtrack	RCA Victor	
November 21	Dirty Dancing	Soundtrack	RCA Victor	
November 28	Dirty Dancing	Soundtrack	RCA Victor	
December 5	Dirty Dancing	Soundtrack	RCA Victor	
December 12	Dirty Dancing	Soundtrack	RCA Victor	
December 19	Dirty Dancing	Soundtrack	RCA Victor	
December 26	Dirty Dancing	Soundtrack	RCA Victor	

== See also ==
- 1987 in music
- List of number-one albums (United States)
- List of best-selling albums
- List of best-selling albums in the United States
