= American Music Award for Achievement =

American music award

American Music Special Achievement Award
- Description: Special honor presented to musical artists for exceptional and impressive career achievements
- Country: United States
- Presented by: American Music Awards

The American Music Special Achievement Award is presented by the American Music Awards to artists who have accomplished impressive success in their careers. The award has been given only five times, with Mariah Carey being the only artist to receive the award twice.

== History ==
Michael Jackson

Michael Jackson was the first recipient ever of the achievement award at the American Music Awards of 1989.

Prince

In 1990, Prince became the second artist to be honored with the accolade. The award was presented to Prince by Anita Baker.

Mariah Carey

On January 17, 2000, Mariah Carey was the 3rd and the first female recipient of the American Music Award of Achievement. Mariah was honored for being the only artist in music history to have a # 1 single every year in one decade (the 1990s), also for having the most #1 singles of any solo female artist (14 at the time), and for surpassing The Beatles for spending the most weeks as Billboard Hot 100's #1 artist. the honor was presented to Mariah by actress and singer Olivia Newton-John. On November 23, 2008, actor Terrence Howard presented Mariah with the honor of the achievement award once again for her 2008 world record of having the most number one singles on Billboard's Hot 100 chart of any solo artist in music history, which includes Elvis Presley when "Touch My Body" from Mariah's 2008 album "E=MC2" became her 18th #1 single. Also for spending the most weeks as the Billboard Hot 100 chart's number one artist, more weeks than any artist in music history. Mariah Carey is the only previous American Music Award of Achievement recipient to receive the award twice.

Katy Perry

During the 2011 American Music Awards, Katy Perry became the 2nd female recipient of the American Music Award of Achievement for her accomplishment as the first female artist to have five number-one singles from one album.

== Award recipients ==
=== 1980s ===
Year	Artist	Ref
1989 (16th)	Michael Jackson	

=== 1990s ===
Year	Artist	Ref
1990 (17th)	Prince	

=== 2000s ===
Year	Artist	Ref
2000 (27th)	Mariah Carey	
2008 (36th)	Mariah Carey (Honorary Award)	

=== 2010s ===
Year	Artist	Ref
2011 (39th)	Katy Perry	
