= Number Ones (Michael Jackson album) =

Greatest hits album by Michael Jackson
- Released: November 18, 2003
- Recorded: 1978–2003
- Genre: Pop
- Length: 78:52 (US version); 79:01 (International version)
- Labels: MJJ; Epic; Sony Music
- Producers: Michael Jackson; Quincy Jones; Bill Bottrell; R. Kelly; David Foster; Rodney Jerkins; Dr. Freeze; The Jacksons

Michael Jackson chronology
| Love Songs (2002) | Number Ones (2003) | The Ultimate Collection (2004) |

Singles from Number Ones
- 1. "One More Chance" Released: November 22, 2003

Professional ratings
Review scores
| Source | Rating |
|---|---|
| AllMusic | 4/5 stars |
| The Guardian | 4/5 stars |
| Rolling Stone | 4/5 stars |
| Tom Hull – on the Web | A− |

Number Ones is a greatest hits album by American singer-songwriter Michael Jackson. It was released on November 18, 2003, by Epic Records. Number Ones was Jackson's first standalone compilation album with Epic Records, after the release of the first disc of HIStory: Past, Present and Future, Book I in 1995 (and after the re-release of that disc as a single album titled Greatest Hits: HIStory, Volume I in 2001). The album included Jackson's singles that reportedly reached number 1 in charts around the world, hence the album's name. Number Ones also features the last original single released during Jackson's lifetime, "One More Chance", released four days after the release of the album.

Number Ones was successful around the world, originally reaching number one in the United Kingdom, among other countries. The album eventually returned to the top spot in the UK after Jackson's sudden death in 2009, and became the number one selling album in the United States for six non-consecutive weeks and stayed at number one for twenty-seven weeks on the US Top Pop Catalog Albums chart that year. However, as a 'catalog' title, initially Number Ones was excluded from the Billboard 200, the main albums chart in the United States, denying Jackson a seventh solo number-one album on the chart. The rules preventing titles older than 18 months to chart on the Billboard 200 were subsequently changed in the fall of 2009 due to the posthumous success of Jackson, as well as the Beatles' re-mastered re-releases. It later peaked at number six on the Billboard 200 in 2026.

With Number Ones, Jackson was the first artist to sell more than one million music downloads in one week. The album was also the third best-selling album of 2009 in the United States according to Nielsen Soundscan and ninth best-selling worldwide according to IFPI. By 2021, Number Ones was certified 5× Platinum by the Recording Industry Association of America (RIAA). At the 2009 American Music Awards, it won two awards - Favorite Pop/Rock Album and Favorite Soul/R&B Album. One of the best-selling albums of the 21st century, the compilation managed to sell over 10 million copies worldwide.

== Background ==
In 2003, Sony released Number Ones, which was different from Greatest Hits: HIStory, Volume I in several ways. The former sold over 5 million copies, comprised fifteen singles (fourteen of them Billboard Hot 100 Top 10 hits): three from Off the Wall, five from Thriller, four from Bad and three from Dangerous. The versions of those songs were included exactly as they appeared on the original albums, whereas Number Ones included radio edits, single versions, and new edits. Number Ones also offered singles from the second disc of HIStory: Past, Present and Future, Book I, plus the title track from Blood on the Dance Floor: HIStory in the Mix for the international versions and "You Rock My World", the hit single from Invincible. The album also included two other tracks: "Break of Dawn" (an album track from Invincible) and the new, previously unreleased single, "One More Chance", which became the final hit single during his lifetime. The beat-heavy ballad "One More Chance", which was written for Jackson by R. Kelly, was recorded for this collection. The U.S. release also included another track, a 1981 live rendition of "Ben" from the Epic release The Jacksons Live!. "Ben" reached the number one position in 1972 on Motown, and became Jackson's first number one single in the United States as a solo artist.

There were four covers for the Number Ones album: a pose from the "Bad" music video, a pose from a photo session for the "Off the Wall" album cover, a pose where he is suspended on his toes while performing "Billie Jean", and the final cover shows him holding his signature fedora, in the midst of a kick (from "Black or White").

== Later impact ==
Number Ones debuted at No. 13 in Billboard's top 200 chart with sales of 121,000 copies in the U.S. It peaked at #6.

Number Ones had already sold 1,825,000 copies in the United States before the week of Jackson's death. Following Jackson's death on June 25, 2009, the album sold 108,000 units in the US on the chart week ending July 1, 2009, and was the biggest-selling album of the week, though only one-quarter of Jackson's entire US album sales recorded that week, shifting just under 425,000 albums and 2.6 million digital singles (more than 50 times of all the combined digital single sales of the previous week and making Jackson the first artist to sell more than one million downloads in one week). The following week it remained the biggest selling album shifting its largest one-week sales since being released in 2003 with 350,000 copies sold, as Jackson's overall album sales tally swelled to 1.1 million for the week. Number Ones was 2009's third biggest-selling album according to SoundScan, behind Susan Boyle's I Dreamed a Dream and Taylor Swift's Fearless. Although it was the best selling album for three weeks in a row, the record was not allowed to chart on the Billboard 200 due to (now defunct) rules, but entered the Comprehensive Chart at number 1 where it remained for six weeks. Number Ones was the best-selling album in the United States for six consecutive weeks amassing sales of 2.36 million by the end of 2009. The Billboard Catalog chart also allowed Number Ones to chart, which led Jackson in occupying the entire top 12 positions on the chart. Number Ones has topped the Top Catalog Albums Chart several times; most recently for three consecutive weeks in May and June 2014. As of July 29, 2016, the album has sold over 5.3 million copies in the US. Number Ones is Jackson’s best-selling hits package in the Nielsen era (1991–present), and third-biggest seller overall in that period (behind Thriller, with 6.7 million, and Dangerous, with 6.5 million).

In the United Kingdom, Ireland and Canada, the album re-entered the UK charts at number 1 the week following Jackson's death.

In New Zealand, Number Ones re-entered the chart following Jackson's death at number 38, climbing to number 4 the following week. It then reached number 1 the following week; the album was also certified 4× Platinum, shipping over 60,000 copies.

== Track listing ==
All tracks are written by Michael Jackson, except where noted.

North American version
| No. | Title | Writer(s) | Album | Length |
|---|---|---|---|---|
| 1. | "Don't Stop 'Til You Get Enough" (2003 Edit) | | Off the Wall, 1979 | 3:56 |
| 2. | "Rock with You" (album version #2) | Rod Temperton | Off the Wall | 3:40 |
| 3. | "Billie Jean" (single version / album version #2) | | Thriller, 1982 | 4:53 |
| 4. | "Beat It" | | Thriller | 4:17 |
| 5. | "Thriller" (Radio Edit) | Temperton | Thriller | 5:11 |
| 6. | "I Just Can't Stop Loving You" (featuring Siedah Garrett) (Radio Edit / album version #2) | | Bad, 1987 | 4:11 |
| 7. | "Bad" | | Bad | 4:06 |
| 8. | "Smooth Criminal" (album version #3) | | Bad | 4:17 |
| 9. | "The Way You Make Me Feel" (album version #2) | | Bad | 4:56 |
| 10. | "Man in the Mirror" (2003 Edit) | Garrett; Glen Ballard | Bad | 5:03 |
| 11. | "Dirty Diana" (single version / album version #2) | | Bad | 4:40 |
| 12. | "Black or White" (2003 Edit) | Jackson; Bill Bottrell | Dangerous, 1991 | 3:18 |
| 13. | "You Are Not Alone" (Radio Edit) | R. Kelly | HIStory: Past, Present and Future, Book I, 1995 | 4:34 |
| 14. | "Earth Song" (2003 Edit) | | HIStory: Past, Present and Future, Book I | 5:01 |
| 15. | "You Rock My World" (Radio Edit) | Jackson; Rodney Jerkins; Fred Jerkins III; LaShawn Daniels; Nora Payne | Invincible, 2001 | 4:25 |
| 16. | "Break of Dawn" | Jackson; Elliot "Dr. Freeze" Straite | Invincible | 5:29 |
| 17. | "One More Chance" | R. Kelly | Previously unreleased | 3:49 |
| 18. | "Ben" (Live from Triumph Tour 1981) (2003 Edit) | Walter Scharf; Don Black | The Jacksons Live!, 1981 | 2:58 |
| Total length: | | | | 78:52 |

International version
| No. | Title | Writer(s) | Album | Length |
|---|---|---|---|---|
| 1. | "Don't Stop 'Til You Get Enough" (2003 Edit) | | Off the Wall | 3:56 |
| 2. | "Rock with You" (album version #2) | Temperton | Off the Wall | 3:40 |
| 3. | "Billie Jean" (single version / album version #2) | | Thriller | 4:53 |
| 4. | "Beat It" | | Thriller | 4:17 |
| 5. | "Thriller" (Radio Edit) | Temperton | Thriller | 5:11 |
| 6. | "Human Nature" | Steve Porcaro; John Bettis | Thriller | 4:05 |
| 7. | "I Just Can't Stop Loving You" (featuring Siedah Garrett) (Radio Edit / album version #2) | | Bad | 4:11 |
| 8. | "Bad" | | Bad | 4:06 |
| 9. | "The Way You Make Me Feel" (album version #2) | | Bad | 4:56 |
| 10. | "Dirty Diana" (single version / album version #2) | | Bad | 4:40 |
| 11. | "Smooth Criminal" (album version #3) | | Bad | 4:17 |
| 12. | "Black or White" (2003 Edit) | Jackson; Bottrell | Dangerous | 3:18 |
| 13. | "You Are Not Alone" (Radio Edit) | R. Kelly | HIStory: Past, Present and Future, Book I | 4:34 |
| 14. | "Earth Song" (2003 Edit) | | HIStory: Past, Present and Future, Book I | 5:01 |
| 15. | "Blood on the Dance Floor" | Jackson; Teddy Riley | Blood on the Dance Floor: HIStory in the Mix, 1997 | 4:11 |
| 16. | "You Rock My World" (Radio Edit) | Jackson; R. Jerkins; F. Jerkins; Daniels; Payne | Invincible | 4:25 |
| 17. | "Break of Dawn" | Jackson; Straite | Invincible | 5:29 |
| 18. | "One More Chance" | R. Kelly | Previously unreleased | 3:49 |
| Total length: | | | | 79:01 |

DVD: Number Ones (Walmart Fan Pack)
| No. | Title | Writer(s) | Director(s) | Length |
|---|---|---|---|---|
| 1. | "Don't Stop 'Til You Get Enough" | | Nick Saxton | 4:11 |
| 2. | "Rock with You" | | Bruce Gowers | 3:22 |
| 3. | "Billie Jean" | | Steve Barron | 4:55 |
| 4. | "Beat It" | | Bob Giraldi | 4:56 |
| 5. | "Thriller" | | John Landis | 13:43 |
| 6. | "Bad" | | Martin Scorsese | 4:20 |
| 7. | "The Way You Make Me Feel" | | Joe Pytka | 6:43 |
| 8. | "Man in the Mirror" | Garrett; Ballard | Donald Wilson | 5:02 |
| 9. | "Smooth Criminal" | | Colin Chilvers | 4:16 |
| 10. | "Dirty Diana" | | Pytka | 5:08 |
| 11. | "Black or White" | Jackson; Bottrell | Landis | 6:22 |
| 12. | "You Are Not Alone" | R. Kelly | Wayne Isham | 5:37 |
| 13. | "Earth Song" | | Nicholas Brandt | 7:29 |
| 14. | "Blood on the Dance Floor" | Jackson; Riley | Jackson; Vincent Paterson | 4:15 |
| 15. | "You Rock My World" | Jackson; R. Jerkins; F. Jerkins; Daniels; Payne | Paul Hunter | 10:26 |
| Total length: | | | | 90:45 |

=== Comparison table ===
The songs included on each international version and format are summarized below, sortable using the position within an edition.

| Song | North American/ South American (in some countries)/ Asian (in some countries) CD | European/ Australian/ Canadian/ South American (in some countries)/ Japanese/ Asian (in some countries) CD/ Worldwide vinyl | DVD | DVD (Chinese version) | Countries in which song was number one (Note: By the time of the album's release in 2003.) |
|---|---|---|---|---|---|
| "Don't Stop 'Til You Get Enough" (2003 edit) | 1 | 1 | 1 | | (United States) (New Zealand) (Australia) (Denmark) (Republic of Ireland) (Norway) (South Africa) |
| "Rock with You" (album version #2 – 7" remix) | 2 | 2 | 2 | 1 | (United States) |
| "Billie Jean" | 3 | 3 | 3 | 2 | (United States) (Australia) (Canada) (France) (Switzerland) (United Kingdom) (Belgium) (Republic of Ireland) |
| "Beat It" | 4 | 4 | 4 | 3 | (United States) (Canada) (New Zealand) (Netherlands) (Belgium) |
| "Thriller" (remixed short version with rap) | 5 | 5 | 5 | 4 | (France) (Belgium) |
| "Human Nature" | | 6 | | | (Canada) (Note: "Human Nature" peaked at number one on the RPM Adult Contemporary chart.) |
| "I Just Can't Stop Loving You" (featuring Siedah Garrett) (US promo single / album version #2) | 6 | 7 | | | (United States) (Netherlands) (New Zealand) (United Kingdom) (Belgium) (Republic of Ireland) (Norway) |
| "Bad" (7" single mix) | 7 | 8 | 6 | 5 | (United States) (Netherlands) (New Zealand) (Belgium) (Republic of Ireland) (Norway) |
| "Smooth Criminal" (album version #3) | 8 | 11 | 9 | | (Netherlands) (Belgium) (Iceland) |
| "The Way You Make Me Feel" (album version #2) | 9 | 9 | 7 | 6 | (United States) (Republic of Ireland) |
| "Man in the Mirror" (2003 edit) | 10 | | 8 | 7 | (United States) |
| "Dirty Diana" (single edit / album version #2) | 11 | 10 | 10 | 8 | (United States) (Belgium) |
| "Black or White" (2003 edit) | 12 | 12 | 11 | 9 | (United States) (Australia) (Canada) (France) (New Zealand) (Switzerland) (United Kingdom) (Belgium) (Cuba) (Denmark) (Finland) (Greece) (Republic of Ireland) (Italy) (Mexico) (Norway) (Sweden) (Turkey) |
| "You Are Not Alone" (radio edit) | 13 | 13 | 12 | 10 | (United States) (France) (New Zealand) (Switzerland) (United Kingdom) (Belgium) (Republic of Ireland) (Poland) (Romania) |
| "Earth Song" (2003 edit) | 14 | 14 | 13 | 11 | (Germany) (Switzerland) (United Kingdom) (Iceland) |
| "Blood on the Dance Floor" | | 15 | 14 | | (New Zealand) (United Kingdom) (Denmark) |
| "You Rock My World" (radio edit) | 15 | 16 | 15 | 12 | (France) (Poland) (Portugal) (Romania) (South Africa) |
| "Break of Dawn" | 16 | 17 | | | |
| "One More Chance" | 17 | 18 | | | |
| "Ben" (live from Triumph Tour 1981; 2003 edit) | 18 | | | | (United States) (Australia) (Note: The original studio recording of "Ben" reached the top of the charts in the US and Australia.) |

== Charts ==
=== Weekly charts ===
| Chart (2003–2026) | Peak position |
|---|---|
| Australian Albums (ARIA) | 2 |
| Austrian Albums (Ö3 Austria) | 11 |
| Belgian Albums (Ultratop Flanders) | 7 |
| Belgian Albums (Ultratop Wallonia) | 2 |
| Canadian Albums (Jam! CANOE) | 1 |
| Canadian R&B Albums (Nielsen SoundScan) | 6 |
| Canadian Albums (Billboard) | 8 |
| Croatian International Albums (HDU) | 15 |
| Czech Albums (ČNS IFPI) | 14 |
| Danish Albums (Hitlisten) | 11 |
| Dutch Albums (Album Top 100) | 17 |
| Finnish Midprice Albums (Suomen virallinen albumilista) | 1 |
| French Albums (SNEP) | 89 |
| German Albums (Offizielle Top 100) | 2 |
| German Pop Albums (Offizielle Top 100) | 2 |
| Greek Albums (IFPI) | 6 |
| Hungarian Albums (MAHASZ) | 4 |
| Icelandic Albums (Tónlistinn) | 15 |
| Irish Albums (IRMA) | 1 |
| Italian Albums (FIMI) | 12 |
| Japanese Albums (Oricon) | 36 |
| Mexican Albums (Top 100 Mexico) | 6 |
| New Zealand Albums (RMNZ) | 1 |
| Norwegian Albums (VG-lista) | 36 |
| Polish Albums (ZPAV) | 1 |
| Portuguese Albums (AFP) | 23 |
| Scottish Albums (Official Charts) | 3 |
| Spanish Albums (Promusicae) | 53 |
| Swedish Albums (Sverigetopplistan) | 10 |
| Swiss Albums (Schweizer Hitparade) | 9 |
| UK Albums (Official Charts) | 1 |
| US Billboard 200 | 6 |
| US Top Catalog Albums (Billboard) | 1 |
| US Top R&B/Hip-Hop Albums (Billboard) | 2 |
| US Indie Store Album Sales (Billboard) | 3 |

=== Year-end charts ===
| Year | Chart | Position |
|---|---|---|
| 2003 | Australian Albums (ARIA) | 52 |
| 2003 | UK Albums (OCC) | 8 |
| 2003 | Worldwide Albums (IFPI) | 28 |
| 2004 | Australian Albums (ARIA) | 53 |
| 2004 | UK Albums (OCC) | 57 |
| 2004 | US Billboard 200 | 104 |
| 2005 | UK Albums (OCC) | 176 |
| 2006 | UK Albums (OCC) | 161 |
| 2009 | Australian Albums (ARIA) | 13 |
| 2009 | German Albums (Offizielle Top 100) | 33 |
| 2009 | New Zealand Albums (RMNZ) | 28 |
| 2009 | UK Albums (OCC) | 73 |
| 2009 | US Billboard Comprehensive Albums | 4 |
| 2009 | US Catalog Albums (Billboard) | 1 |
| 2010 | UK Albums (OCC) | 76 |
| 2010 | US Billboard 200 | 39 |
| 2010 | US Catalog Albums (Billboard) | 1 |
| 2011 | US Billboard 200 | 120 |
| 2011 | US Catalog Albums (Billboard) | 4 |
| 2012 | US Catalog Albums (Billboard) | 26 |
| 2015 | UK Albums (OCC) | 68 |
| 2016 | Polish Albums (ZPAV) | 90 |
| 2016 | UK Albums (OCC) | 97 |
| 2017 | UK Albums (OCC) | 70 |
| 2018 | Irish Albums (IRMA) | 40 |
| 2018 | UK Albums (OCC) | 63 |
| 2019 | UK Albums (OCC) | 56 |
| 2020 | UK Albums (OCC) | 39 |
| 2021 | Irish Albums (IRMA) | 48 |
| 2021 | UK Albums (OCC) | 29 |
| 2022 | UK Albums (OCC) | 23 |

=== Decade-end charts ===
| Chart (2000–2009) | Position |
|---|---|
| UK Albums (OCC) | 37 |

| Chart (2010–2019) | Position |
|---|---|
| Australian Albums (ARIA) | 59 |
| UK Albums (OCC) | 58 |

== Certifications and sales ==
| Region | Certification | Certified units/sales |
|---|---|---|
| Argentina (CAPIF) | Platinum | 40,000^{^} |
| Australia (ARIA) | 6× Platinum | 420,000^{^} |
| Austria (IFPI Austria) | Gold | 15,000^{*} |
| Denmark (IFPI Danmark) for DVD | Gold | 20,000^{^} |
| Germany (BVMI) | Gold | 100,000^{^} |
| Ireland (IRMA) | 5× Platinum | 75,000^{^} |
| Italy (FIMI) sales + streams since 2009 | Platinum | 50,000^{‡} |
| Japan (RIAJ) | Platinum | 250,000^{^} |
| Mexico (AMPROFON) | Gold | 50,000^{^} |
| New Zealand (RMNZ) | 4× Platinum | 60,000^{^} |
| Poland (ZPAV) | Platinum | 20,000^{‡} |
| Russia (NFPF) | Platinum | 20,000^{*} |
| Spain (Promusicae) | Gold | 50,000^{^} |
| Switzerland (IFPI Switzerland) | Gold | 20,000^{^} |
| United Kingdom (BPI) | 10× Platinum | 3,000,000^{‡} |
| United States (RIAA) | 5× Platinum | 5,300,000 |
Summaries
| Worldwide | — | 10,000,000 |
^{*} Sales figures based on certification alone.^{^} Shipments figures based on certification alone.^{‡} Sales+streaming figures based on certification alone.

== See also ==
- Number Ones (video)
- List of best-selling singles and albums of 2003 in Ireland
- List of best-selling albums of the 2000s (decade) in the United Kingdom
- List of best-selling albums of the 2000s (century) in the United Kingdom
- List of best-selling albums of the 21st century
