= The One (video) =

Video by Michael Jackson
- Released: March 9, 2004
- Genre: Pop
- Length: 39 minutes
- Label: Epic Music Video
- Producer: Michael Jackson

Michael Jackson chronology
Number Ones (2003)	The One (2004)	Live in Bucharest: The Dangerous Tour (2005)

Michael Jackson: The One is the DVD release of a CBS special that aired in January 2004. Released by Epic Records, it includes interviews with other celebrities (including Beyoncé, Pharrell Williams, and Quincy Jones) about Jackson's influence on music and pop culture, and also contains clips from Jackson's previous music videos. It was certified Gold in the US five months after release, with shipments amassing 50,000 units by that point. The certification body of the US—the RIAA—recognizes the DVD as an official Michael Jackson production. It was also released on Video CD format, in several Asian countries such as India and Thailand.

== Track listing ==
=== Includes short snippets of ===
1. "I Want You Back" (with live snippets from American Bandstand during 1970)
2. "Ben" (with live snippets from "The Jacksons: Live!" during the Triumph Tour)
3. "Working Day and Night"
4. "Rock with You" (with live snippets during the Triumph Tour and Yokohama 1987 during the Bad World Tour)
5. "Don't Stop 'Til You Get Enough" (with live snippets during the Triumph Tour)
6. "Billie Jean" (with live snippets from Motown 25 and Yokohama 1987 during the Bad World Tour)
7. "Wanna Be Startin' Somethin'"
8. "Beat It" (with live snippets from Munich 1997 during the HIStory World Tour and Bucharest 1992 during the Dangerous World Tour)
9. "Thriller"
10. "Another Part of Me"
11. "Bad" (with live snippets from Yokohama 1987 and Los Angeles 1989 during the Bad World Tour)
12. "Dirty Diana"
13. "Smooth Criminal" (with live snippets from Bucharest 1992 during the Dangerous World Tour)
14. "Black or White" (with live snippets from Bucharest and Tokyo 1992 during the Dangerous World Tour)
15. "One More Chance" (with live snippets from various concerts and tours)
16. "You Rock My World"

== Certifications ==
Country	Certification	Sales
Australia	Gold	7,500+
Spain	Gold	10,000+
United States	Gold	50,000+
