= Number Ones (video) =

Video by Michael Jackson
- Released: November 18, 2003
- Recorded: 1979–2001
- Genres: Pop; rock; funk; dance-pop; urban; new jack swing
- Length: 90:45
- Label: Epic
- Director: Various
- Producers: Michael Jackson; various

Michael Jackson chronology
HIStory on Film, Volume II (1997)	Number Ones (2003)	The One (2004)

Number Ones is a video album by American recording artist Michael Jackson. It was released on DVD on November 13, 2003 under the Epic Records record label, in conjunction with the promotion for Jackson's greatest hits album of the same name (although the album and DVD have different songs). The DVD, which is Jackson's fourth DVD album, contains fifteen music videos directed and produced by various people. It consists of music videos filmed and released by Jackson from 1979's Off the Wall to 2001's Invincible. As with the album, the DVD has four different covers.

Notable music videos included on the DVD were "Beat It", "Billie Jean" and Thriller—which received heavy rotation on MTV in the 1980s, and are credited as having transformed the music video from a promotional tool and into an art form, and "Black or White" which was also prominent on channels like MTV in the 1990s.

Number Ones received praise from contemporary music critics and was commercially successful internationally. The DVD peaked at number one on the Australian Top 40 Music DVD in Australia. Number Ones has been certified twenty-two times platinum in Australia by the Australian Recording Industry Association and is the best selling music DVD ever by a male solo artist in Australia. It is also thirteen times platinum in the United States by the Recording Industry Association of America.

== Background ==
In 1972, while still a member of the band The Jackson 5, Michael Jackson released his first of what would be ten studio albums, Got to Be There. Four singles were taken from the album, although they were not promoted by music videos, and this pattern continued for his next three Motown studio albums, Ben (1972), Music & Me (1973) and Forever, Michael (1975).

Unlike in the past, Jackson released his debut music video for the lead single, "Don't Stop 'Til You Get Enough", from his 1979 album, Off the Wall, released on Epic Records/CBS. Jackson subsequently began releasing music videos for his singles to promote both the song itself and the album. His music videos from the 1980s — particularly the music videos for "Billie Jean" and Thriller — received heavy rotation on channels like Music Television (MTV). The popularity of his music videos that aired on MTV, such as "Beat It", "Billie Jean" and Thriller — credited for transforming the music video from a promotional tool and into an art form — helped bring the relatively new channel to fame. Music videos such as "Black or White" made Jackson an enduring staple on MTV in the 1990s. Some of them drew criticism for their violent and sexual content, others were lauded by critics and awarded Guinness World Records for their length, success and expense. From 1979 to 2003, Jackson released thirty-six music videos.

== Content and release ==
Number Ones was released in conjunction with Jackson's greatest number one hits of the same name on November 18, 2003. The DVD was released worldwide on November 13, 2003. Number Ones is the fourth DVD album to be released by Jackson; the previous three were Dangerous: The Short Films, Video Greatest Hits – HIStory and HIStory on Film, Volume II. The DVD contained ninety one minutes of music video Jackson had already released from as early as 1979 to as late as 2001. This compilation was also released in Asia on double Video CD format.

Music videos from Jackson's Sony studio albums, which were Off the Wall (1979), Thriller (1982), Bad (1987), Dangerous (1991), HIStory: Past, Present and Future, Book I (1995), Blood on the Dance Floor: HIStory in the Mix (1997) and Invincible (2001), were featured on the DVD. The DVD consisted of fifteen music videos, both long and short form versions. "I Just Can't Stop Loving You" (1987), "Break of Dawn" (2001), the then newly recorded "One More Chance" (2003) and a live version of "Ben" (1972) did not make it onto the DVD (while no music videos were shot for the first two singles, the music video for "One More Chance" would later be released in 2010's Michael Jackson's Vision), while "Blood on the Dance Floor" (1997), which was on the DVD, was not on the American version of the album of the same name, same with "Man in the Mirror" for the international version of the album.

== Reception ==
=== Commercial reception ===
Number Ones peaked at number one the ARIA Top 40 Music DVD chart in Australia. It was ranked at number two, charting behind only Funhouse Tour: Live In Australia by Pink, on the Australian Highest Selling Music DVD chart for 2009. It also peaked at number three on the Swedish DVD Albums Chart. In Czech Republic, Number Ones peaked at number fourteen on the DVD chart. Number Ones peaked at number three on the Hungarian Top 20 DVD chart. In Italy, Number Ones peaked at number nine on the country's DVD album chart, as of the first week of May 2010, it has stayed on the chart for forty five weeks. The DVD album was certified thirteen times platinum by the Recording Industry Association of America for the sales of over 1.3 million units in the United States. Number Ones was also certified twenty-two times platinum by the Australian Recording Industry Association for the sales of over 330,000 units in Australia. Recording Industry Association of Japan certified the DVD gold for the sales of over 100,000 units in Japan. For the sales of over 25,000 units in Spain, Productores de Música de España gave the album two times platinum certification. Number Ones was also certified six times platinum for the sales of 30,000 units in New Zealand, as well as gold by the Polish Society of the Phonographic Industry for the sales of at least 5,000 units in Poland.

=== Critical reception ===
Professional ratings
Review scores
Source	Rating
AllMusic	Positive
Philadelphia Inquirer	Positive

Number Ones was generally well received by contemporary music critics. William Ruhlmann, a writer for AllMusic, stated that watching the videos in order made him 'experience' Jackson's changing appearance over the years; noting things such as Jackson's skin becoming lighter (a result of his vitiligo). Ruhlmann commented that seeing Jackson's changing appearance, as well as the videos itself helped him understand Jackson's career more, commenting, "Number Ones was released at what appeared to be the end of Michael Jackson's long, troubled reign as a pop star, and it contained many clues to both his success and his downfall." Ruhlmann further noted that "a messianic theme ran through many of the videos" like the relatively modest "Beat It," which is about stopping violence, to "Earth Song," in which Jackson restored ravaged rain forests and even brought the dead back to life. Dan LeLuca of the Philadelphia Inquirer described Number Ones as being a "reminder" of the "MTV era". Jeff Mires of News Pop Music Critic felt that the release of both the Number Ones CD and DVD was a good opportunity to "revisit Jackson's music".

== Track listing ==
DVD
No.	Title	Writer(s)	Director(s)	Length
1.	"Don't Stop 'Til You Get Enough^{[C]}"	Michael Jackson	Nick Saxton	4:11
2.	"Rock with You"	Rod Temperton	Bruce Gowers	3:22
3.	"Billie Jean"	Jackson	Steve Barron	4:55
4.	"Beat It"	Jackson	Bob Giraldi	4:56
5.	"Thriller"	Temperton	John Landis	13:43
6.	"Bad^{[A]}"	Jackson	Martin Scorsese	4:20
7.	"The Way You Make Me Feel^{[A]}"	Jackson	Joe Pytka	6:43
8.	"Man in the Mirror"	Siedah Garrett, Glen Ballard	Donald Wilson	5:02
9.	"Smooth Criminal^{[B]}^{[C]}"	Jackson	Colin Chilvers	4:16
10.	"Dirty Diana"	Jackson	Pytka	5:08
11.	"Black or White^{[A]}"	Jackson	Landis	6:22
12.	"You Are Not Alone"	R. Kelly	Wayne Isham	5:37
13.	"Earth Song"	Jackson	Nicholas Brandt	7:29
14.	"Blood on the Dance Floor^{[C]}"	Jackson, Teddy Riley	Jackson and Vincent Paterson	4:15
15.	"You Rock My World^{[A]}"	Jackson, Rodney Jerkins, Fred Jerkins III, LaShawn Daniels, Nora Payne	Paul Hunter	10:26

Notes:

- ^A The short version of the music video is featured on Number Ones.
- ^B The "end credits" version of the video is featured on Number Ones.
- ^C "Don't Stop 'Til You Get Enough", "Smooth Criminal", and "Blood on the Dance Floor" were excluded on the Chinese version.

=== Formats ===
The DVD album has been released in one version, as a one disc release.

- Keep case — DVD size packaging

The video was also available on double Video CD (in the Asian market only). In 2006, it was also released as a UMD video for the Sony PSP.

== Charts ==
Chart (2003–2009)	Peak position
Australian Top 40 Music DVD	1
Czech Albums Chart	14
Hungarian Top 20 DVD	3
Irish DVD Albums Chart	1
Italian DVD Albums Chart	9
Swedish DVD Albums Chart	3

== Certifications ==
Region	Certification	Certified units/sales
Argentina (CAPIF)	Platinum	8,000^{^}
Australia (ARIA)	23× Platinum	345,000^{^}
Denmark (IFPI Danmark)	Gold	
Finland (Musiikkituottajat)	Gold	5,016
France (SNEP)	2× Platinum	40,000^{*}
Japan (RIAJ)	Gold	100,000^{^}
New Zealand (RMNZ)	6× Platinum	30,000^{^}
Poland (ZPAV)	Gold	5,000^{*}
Spain (Promusicae)	Platinum	25,000^{^}
United Kingdom (BPI)	Platinum	50,000^{*}
United States (RIAA)	13× Platinum	1,300,000^{^}
^{*} Sales figures based on certification alone.^{^} Shipments figures based on certification alone.

== Personnel ==
Credits adapted from AllMusic

- Michael Jackson – vocals, producer, executive producer, video director
- Julian Alexander – art direction
- Steve Barron – video director
- Bill Bottrell – producer
- Nicholas Brandt – video director
- Rance Brown – art direction, design
- Colin Chilvers – video director
- David Daoud Coleman – art direction
- Nancy Donald – art direction
- Sam Emerson – photography
- Karen Faye – make-up, hair stylist
- David Foster – producer
- Bob Giraldi – video director
- Bruce Gowers – video director
- Stephen Harvey – photography
- Wayne Isham – video director
- Rodney Jerkins – producer
- Quincy Jones – producer
- R. Kelly – producer ("You Are Not Alone")
- John Landis – video director
- Sheri G. Lee – art direction
- John McClain – executive producer
- Adam Owett – art direction
- Vince Peterson – video director
- Joe Pytka – video director
- Seth Riggs – vocal consultant
- Nick Saxton – video director
- Martin Scorsese – video director
- Don Wilson – video director
- Dick Zimmerman – photography

== Notes ==
Bibliography

- Halstead, Craig (2007). Michael Jackson: For the Record. Authors OnLine. ISBN 978-0-7552-0267-6.
- George, Nelson (2004). Michael Jackson: The Ultimate Collection booklet. Sony BMG.
