= Earth Song =

1995 single by Michael Jackson

Single by Michael Jackson

from the album HIStory: Past, Present and Future, Book I
- Released: November 6, 1995
- Recorded: 1988; June 1989 – August 1990; September 1994 – March 1995
- Genre: Blues; gospel; pop
- Length: 6:46 (album version); 5:02 (radio edit)
- Label: Epic
- Songwriter: Michael Jackson
- Producers: Michael Jackson; David Foster; Bill Bottrell

Michael Jackson singles chronology
"You Are Not Alone" (1995)	"Earth Song" (1995)	"Why" (1996)

Music video
- "Earth Song" on YouTube

Audio sample
- "Earth Song": file; help

"Earth Song" is a song by the American singer Michael Jackson, released by Epic Records on November 6, 1995, as the third single from Jackson's ninth studio album, HIStory: Past, Present and Future, Book I (1995). It was written by Jackson and produced by Jackson, David Foster and Bill Bottrell.

Though Jackson had previously released socially conscious songs such as "We Are the World", "Man in the Mirror" and "Heal the World", "Earth Song" was his first to overtly discuss the environment and animal welfare. It was accompanied by a lavish music video, directed by Nick Brandt, which was shot in four geographical regions, centered on the destruction and rebirth of Earth.

In the UK, "Earth Song" was the 1995 Christmas number one. It also reached number one in Germany, Iceland, Israel, Spain, Sweden, and Switzerland and number two in France, Ireland, and the Netherlands. Jackson received recognition from various animal and environmental organizations. "Earth Song" was nominated for a Grammy in 1997. A dance version was included on the 1997 remix album Blood on the Dance Floor: HIStory in the Mix. In 2011, "Earth Song" was paired with the poem "Planet Earth" (previously released on Michael Jackson's This Is It, in 2009) and released as a song on the remix album Immortal.

== Production ==
Jackson wrote "Earth Song" at the Vienna Marriott hotel during the Bad World Tour on June 1, 1988. He wanted to create a song that was lyrically deep with an emotional message, but was melodically simple, so the whole world, particularly non-English-speaking fans, could sing along.

"Earth Song" was produced by Jackson, David Foster and Bill Bottrell. Andraé Crouch's Choir and Jackson engage in a call-and-response chant in the climax. Jackson hired the bassist Guy Pratt after hearing his work on the 1989 Madonna single "Like a Prayer". According to Pratt, Jackson was recovering from plastic surgery at the time of the recording and hid under a mixing desk in the studio. Jackson passed instructions for Pratt to an assistant, who pretended that Jackson was not in the room.

According to the drummer, Steve Ferrone, Jackson originally wanted electronic drums instead of acoustic drums. Ferrone made a deal with Jackson to create a demo using electronic drums on the condition that he would also create a demo using acoustic drums. Upon listening to the demo with electronic drums, Jackson almost reneged on the deal; however, he was so moved by the demo with acoustic drums that he started dancing across the room. The final version uses acoustic drums.

== Composition ==
"Earth Song" is a ballad that incorporates elements of blues and gospel. The speaker describes the dire situation that mankind has caused, ranging from war to devastation to animals and Earth itself. The song invokes religious themes such as the Blessing of Abraham, and the line "what about all the peace that you pledge your only son" alludes to Jesus. "What about death again" refers to the final judgement.

== Reception ==
"Earth Song" received mostly positive reviews from music critics. A reviewer from Contra Costa Times called it "a bit sappy and overblown", but also acknowledged that it was "epic" and destined to be a "massive smash hit". James Masterton for Dotmusic described it as a "towering gospel track". Ledger-Enquirer observed that it "enjoys the same kind of subtlety, building to a dramatic call-and-response finish with the Andraé Crouch Choir". Pan-European magazine Music & Media named it Single of the Week and an "ecological anthem", stating that "even without the delightful arrangements (tentative piano, jazzy guitar licks, nature noises), the strong composition would have been a sure thing for the top of the EHR and ACE charts." Music Week rated it five out of five and named it Single of the Week, writing, "This will be huge. Already a favourite from HIStory, it builds from a tweeting birds/strummed harp intro into a no-excess-barred epic, but is beautiful all the same." The Philadelphia Inquirer deemed it "a healing, rhythmic ballad that evokes religious imagery". Michael Mehle of Rocky Mountain News said the finale is "anthemic" and a "powerful gospel opus". James Hunter of Rolling Stone stated, "The slow blues-operatic 'Earth Song' for all its noble sentiments, sounds primarily like a showpiece". The Sacramento Bee described Jackson's vocal performance as "cool". A reviewer from San Jose Mercury News called it "flat" and "whiny", believing Jackson had already experimented with these concepts earlier in his career. Gina Morris from Smash Hits gave it two out of five.

In 2017, ShortList's Dave Fawbert said "Earth Song" contained one of the greatest key changes in music. Jackson received the Genesis Award: 1995 Doris Day Music Award, given each year for animal sensitivity. "Earth Song" was among the songs that Clear Channel advised against playing following the September 11 attacks in 2001.

== Commercial performance ==
In the United Kingdom, "Earth Song" debuted at number one on the UK singles chart, where it remained for six weeks throughout December 1995 — beating the U2/Brian Eno project Passengers to win the Christmas number one spot — and into early 1996. During its stay at number one, "Earth Song" kept the first single released by the Beatles in 25 years, "Free as a Bird", off the number one position as well as other bookmaker favourites "Wonderwall" by Oasis and "It's Oh So Quiet" by Björk. In early December, bookmakers correctly predicted that Jackson would keep the Beatles off the top position and go on to attain the Christmas number-one single. It went on to sell 1,270,000 copies in the nation as of August 2018. The song also took the number one position in Iceland, Lithuania, Spain, Sweden and Switzerland, peaking within the top five in almost every European state. In Germany, it was Jackson's first single to reach No. 1 on the German Singles Chart and held the summit for 5 consecutive weeks.

The song was only released promotionally in the United States, peaking at number 32 on the Hot Dance Music/Club Play chart dated February 10, 1996. In 2006, "Earth Song" reached number 55 on the European Hot 100 Singles chart, following the Visionary: The Video Singles campaign, in which 20 of Jackson's hit singles were reissued in several European countries.

== Live performances ==
Earth Song was first performed on November 4, 1995, on the German TV program Wetten, dass..?, along with "Dangerous". Jackson's performance attracted an audience of 25,000,000 viewers in Germany making it one of the most watched programs of all time. The next performance of the song was at Brit Awards 1996 on February 19, 1996. The 1996 World Music Awards was the next performance of the song on May 8, 1996.

During the ending of the song, Jackson sang the line, "Tell me what about it", which was on the original record. On July 16, 1996, Jackson performed "Earth Song" at the Brunei Royal Concert at Jerudong Park Amphitheatre in Bandar Seri Begawan. Similar to the World Music Awards performance, Jackson sang the line, "Tell me what about it". The song was also performed on Jackson's HIStory World Tour from September 1996 to October 1997.

"Earth Song" was performed at the MJ & Friends concerts in June 1999. During the Munich performance on June 27, 1999, the middle section of the bridge collapsed into the air and came falling down instead of pausing in mid-air. The fall caused severe back pain to Jackson. After the concert, Jackson was rushed to a hospital.

"Earth Song" was planned for his This Is It comeback concerts in London at the O2 Arena, which were canceled due to Jackson's death on June 25, 2009. "Earth Song" was the last song Jackson ever performed, having rehearsed it at Staples Center on June 24, 2009, preparing for This Is It, hours before his death.

=== Brit Awards incident ===
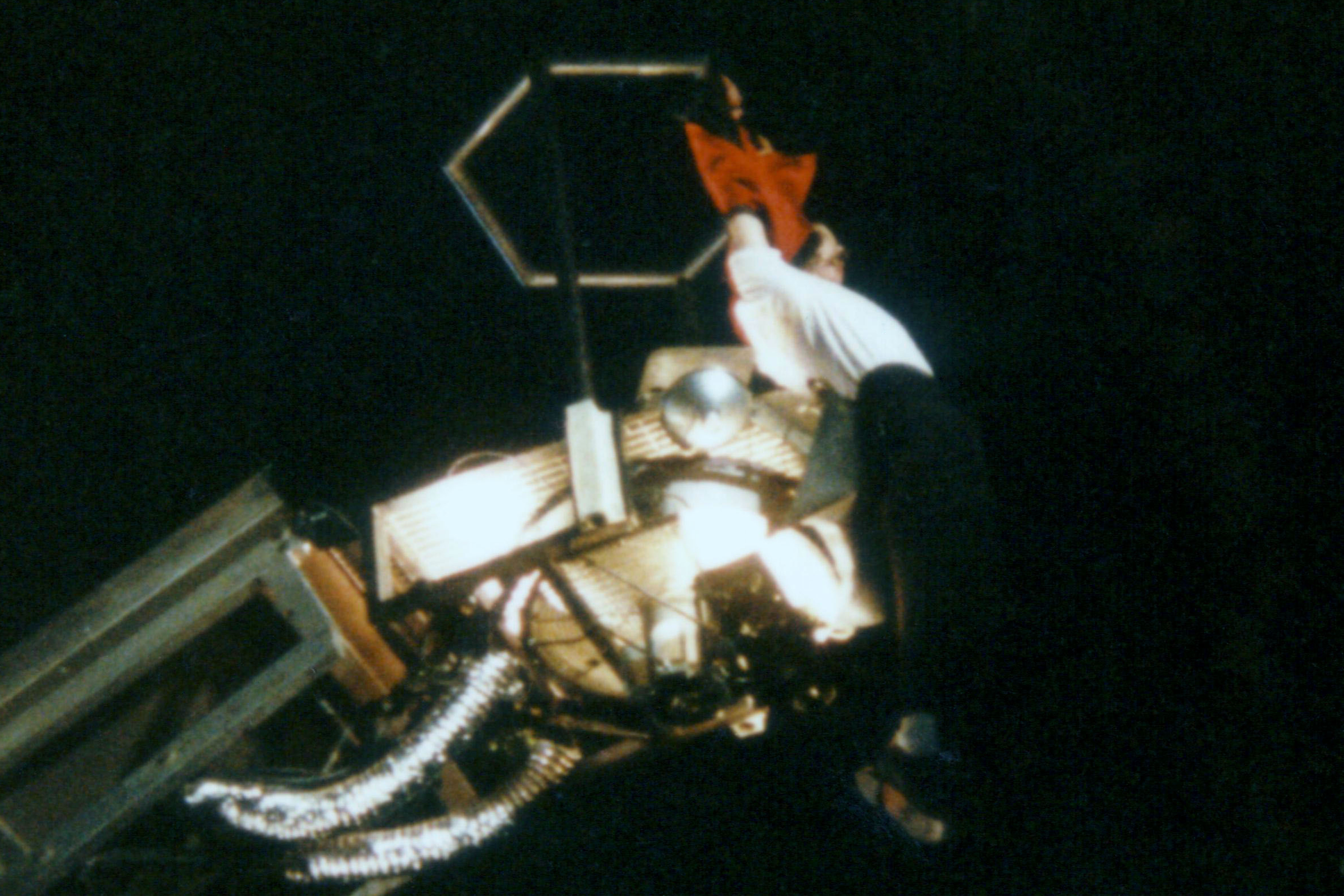
Jackson during a performance of "Earth Song" at the HIStory World Tour in 1997. He dangled from the edge of a crane in a similar manner at the Brit Awards.

On February 19, 1996, Jackson performed "Earth Song" at Brit Awards 1996 in the UK; he was there to collect a special "Artist of a Generation" award. Jackson sang while dangling off the edge of a high-rise crane elevator, which he had used the year before while performing "Earth Song" on the German TV show Wetten, dass..?. A chorus of backing performers began to embrace Jackson upon his descent.

During the performance, British singer Jarvis Cocker ran onstage without permission, lifted his shirt and pretended to break wind, before giving Jackson the V sign. Cocker was there with his band Pulp, who had been nominated for three Brit awards. He was questioned by police over claims he had assaulted some of the child performers. A video provided by an unidentified source showed that it was one of Jackson's crew who had barged into the children, not Cocker, and the charges were dropped.

Cocker said he found the performance offensive, and that Jackson had portrayed himself as Christ-like and could do as he pleased because of his immense wealth and power. He said his actions were directed at Jackson's performance, not Jackson himself, and said that he admired Jackson as a performer: "He can dance, [...] anybody who invents the moonwalk is alright by me." In a 2012 interview with The Observer, Cocker said "Earth Song" was "a right good song, obviously". Jackson condemned Cocker's behavior as "disgusting and cowardly". The incident is referred to in the book Politics and Popular Culture by John Street, a professor of politics at the University of East Anglia:

But to read popular culture as a straight-forward – or at least typical – political text is to take a very narrow view of its meaning, and hence of its political message(s). As we have noted, the text's meaning will depend on how it is heard and read. Michael Jackson may have intended his "Earth Song" as an exercise in compassion; others – like Jarvis Cocker – saw it quite differently. One reason these alternative readings emerge is because of the way the performance of popular culture engages more than a literal text, it employs gestures and symbols, tones of voice, looks and glances, all of which might tell a different story.

=== 1996 History World Tour Seoul incident ===
On October 13, 1996, an incident occurred during Jackson's performance of "Earth Song" at the Jamsil Olympic Stadium in Seoul, South Korea, as part of his HIStory World Tour. While Jackson was elevated above the audience on a mechanical crane in the song's second half, a male audience member bypassed security, ran onto the stage, and climbed up the crane arm to the performer's platform. Upon the fan reaching the platform, Jackson held onto him to prevent a fall while continuing the performance. The crane operator lowered the mechanism near the end as planned, allowing Jackson's security personnel and personnel of the Seoul police to safely remove the individual once it reached stage level. Neither Jackson nor the audience member sustained injuries.

=== 2010 Grammy Awards performance ===
The song was performed as a tribute to Jackson at the 2010 Grammy Awards, along with a 3-D short film that was to be featured in his comeback concert series This Is It. Jennifer Hudson, Carrie Underwood, Smokey Robinson, Celine Dion and Usher all sang the song together, while the video played in the background. The film was shown in its original 3-D format during the broadcast.

Target Corporation provided free 3-D glasses to customers a week before the Grammy Awards. Paris and Prince Jackson, Jackson's eldest children, appeared shortly after the performance to accept his Lifetime Achievement Award. Both gave a short speech, their first time speaking publicly since their father's memorial service the previous year.

== Music video ==
Jackson walking in a burnt down forest. This section of the music video was simulated in a corn field.

The music video for "Earth Song", directed by the British fine art photographer Nick Brandt, was expensive and well-received; it won the 1995 Doris Day Music Award at the Genesis Awards and a Grammy nomination for Best Music Video, Short Form in 1997. The production had an environmental theme, showing images of animal cruelty, deforestation, pollution, poaching, poverty and war. Jackson and the world's people unite in a spiritual chant—"Earth Song"—which summons a force that heals the world. Using special effects, time is reversed so that life returns, war ends and the forests regrow. The video closes with a request for donations to Jackson's Heal the World Foundation. The clip was shown infrequently in the United States.

The video was filmed in four geographic regions (Americas, Europe and Africa). The first location was the Amazon rainforest, featuring actual natives of the region, where a large part was destroyed a week after the video's completion. The second scene was a war zone in Karlovac, Croatia, with Serbian actor Slobodan Dimitrijević and the residents of the area. The third location was Tanzania, which incorporated documentary archive footage of illegal poaching and hunting into the video. The final location was in Warwick, New York, where a forest fire was simulated in a corn field.

The video was also included on the video albums: HIStory on Film, Volume II, Number Ones and Michael Jackson's Vision.

== Track listing ==
- UK CD1
1. "Earth Song" (Radio Edit) – 4:58
2. "Earth Song" (Hani's Club Experience) – 7:55
3. "Michael Jackson DMC Megamix" – 11:18
- UK CD2
1. "Earth Song" (Radio Edit) – 4:58
2. "Earth Song" (Hani's Radio Experience) – 3:33
3. "Wanna Be Startin' Somethin'" (Brothers in Rhythm Mix) – 7:35
4. "Wanna Be Startin' Somethin'" (TommyD's Main Mix) – 7:40
- Earth Song (Hani Remixes)
1. "Earth Song" (Hani's Around the World Experience) – 14:47
2. "Earth Song" (Hani's Club Experience) – 7:55
3. "Earth Song" (Hani's Extended Radio Experience) – 4:32
4. "Earth Song" (Hani's Radio Experience) – 3:33

The DMC Megamix is a medley of "Bad", "Billie Jean", "Black or White", "Don't Stop 'Til You Get Enough", "Remember the Time", "Rock with You", "Scream", "Thriller" and "Wanna Be Startin' Somethin'".

== Personnel ==
Adapted from the HIStory: Past, Present and Future, Book I liner notes.

Musicians

- Michael Jackson – lead vocals, backing vocals, synthesizer
- David Foster – synthesizers
- Michael Boddicker – synthesizers
- David Paich – piano, synthesizer
- Bill Bottrell – acoustic guitar, synthesizer, tambourine
- Michael Thompson – electric guitar
- Guy Pratt – bass guitar
- Steve Ferrone – drums
- London Philharmonic Orchestra – orchestra
- Andraé Crouch Choir – choir

Production

- Michael Jackson – producer, vocal arrangements, rhythm arrangements
- Bill Bottrell – producer
- David Foster – producer, orchestral arrangements, vocal arrangements, rhythm arrangements
- Elmer Bernstein – orchestral arrangements
- Bill Ross – orchestration, conductor
- Bruce Swedien – recording engineer, mixing
- Steve Porcaro – synthesizer programming

== Charts ==
=== Weekly charts ===
Chart (1995–1996)	Peak position
Australia (ARIA)	15
Austria (Ö3 Austria Top 40)	2
Belgium (Ultratop 50 Flanders)	4
Belgium (Ultratop 50 Wallonia)	2
Canada Top Singles (RPM)	40
Canada Adult Contemporary (RPM)	27
Czech Republic (IFPI CR)	3
Denmark (IFPI)	4
Estonia (Eesti Top 20)	16
Europe (European Hot 100)	1
Europe (European Dance Radio)	25
Europe (European Hit Radio)	1
Finland (Suomen virallinen lista)	8
France (SNEP)	2
Germany (GfK)	1
Hungary (Mahasz)	4
Iceland (Íslenski Listinn Topp 40)	1
Ireland (IRMA)	2
Israel (Israeli Singles Chart)	1
Italy (Musica e dischi)	6
Italy Airplay (Music & Media)	1
Lithuania (M-1)	1
Netherlands (Dutch Top 40)	2
Netherlands (Single Top 100)	3
New Zealand (Recorded Music NZ)	4
Norway (VG-lista)	4
Scottish Singles Sales (Official Charts)	1
Spain (AFYVE)	8
Sweden (Sverigetopplistan)	4
Switzerland (Schweizer Hitparade)	1
UK Singles (Official Charts)	1
UK Airplay (Music Week)	1
US Dance Club Songs (Billboard)	32

Chart (2006)	Peak position
Ireland (IRMA)	25
Italy (FIMI)	15
Netherlands (Single Top 100)	46
Spain (Promusicae)	1
Switzerland (Schweizer Hitparade)	71
UK Singles (OCC)	34
UK Hip Hop/R&B (Official Charts)	2

Chart (2009)	Peak position
Austria (Ö3 Austria Top 40)	13
Denmark (Tracklisten)	32
Europe (European Hot 100 Singles)	1
France (SNEP) Download Chart	20
Netherlands (Single Top 100)	13
Scottish Singles Sales (Official Charts)	40
Sweden (Sverigetopplistan)	44
Switzerland (Schweizer Hitparade)	4
UK Singles (OCC)	33
US Digital Song Sales (Billboard)	71

Chart (2013)	Peak position
France (SNEP)	154
Switzerland (Schweizer Hitparade)	73

Chart (2017)	Peak position
France (SNEP)	184

Chart (2026)	Peak position
Croatia International Airplay (Top lista)	90
UK Dance (Official Charts)	35

=== Year-end charts ===
Chart (1995)	Position
Belgium (Ultratop 50 Wallonia)	47
France (SNEP)	55
Germany (Media Control)	48
Israel (Israeli Singles Chart)	26
Netherlands (Single Top 100)	66
Sweden (Topplistan)	63
UK Singles (OCC)	6

Chart (1996)	Position
Austria (Ö3 Austria Top 40)	10
Belgium (Ultratop 50 Flanders)	88
Belgium (Ultratop 50 Wallonia)	50
Europe (Eurochart Hot 100)	8
France (SNEP)	72
Germany (Media Control)	13
Iceland (Íslenski Listinn Topp 40)	33
Netherlands (Dutch Top 40)	60
Netherlands (Single Top 100)	48
Sweden (Topplistan)	63
Switzerland (Schweizer Hitparade)	19
UK Singles (OCC)	48
UK Airplay (Music Week)	38

== Certifications ==
Region	Certification	Certified units/sales
Austria (IFPI Austria)	Platinum	50,000^{*}
Belgium (BRMA)	Gold	25,000^{*}
Canada (Music Canada)	Gold	40,000^{‡}
Denmark (IFPI Danmark)	Gold	45,000^{‡}
France (SNEP)	Gold	250,000^{*}
Germany (BVMI)	2× Platinum	2,000,000
New Zealand (RMNZ)	Gold	15,000^{‡}
Norway (IFPI Norway)	Gold	
Switzerland (IFPI Switzerland)	Platinum	50,000^{^}
United Kingdom (BPI)	Platinum	600,000^{^}
United Kingdom (BPI)	2× Platinum	1,270,000
United States (RIAA)	Gold	500,000^{‡}
Summaries
Worldwide Pure Sales (as of 2011)	—	5,000,000
^{*} Sales figures based on certification alone.^{^} Shipments figures based on certification alone.^{‡} Sales+streaming figures based on certification alone.

== Release history ==
Region	Date	Format(s)	Label(s)	Ref.
Europe	November 6, 1995	CD	Epic	
Australia	November 20, 1995	CD; cassette	Epic	
United States	November 21, 1995	Contemporary hit radio	Epic	
United Kingdom	November 27, 1995	CD; cassette	Epic	
Japan	December 27, 1995	Mini-album	Epic	

== See also ==
- Earth anthem
- List of best-selling singles in Germany
- List of million-selling singles in the United Kingdom

== Bibliography ==
- George, Nelson (2004). Michael Jackson: The Ultimate Collection booklet. Sony BMG.
- Taraborrelli, J. Randy (2004). The Magic and the Madness. Terra Alta, WV: Headline. ISBN 0-330-42005-4.
