= Visionary: The Video Singles =

Box set by Michael Jackson
- Released: February 20, 2006
- Recorded: 1979–1997
- Length: 134:57
- Labels: Epic; Legacy; Sony BMG
- Producers: Michael Jackson; Quincy Jones; Bill Bottrell; Bruce Swedien; R. Kelly; David Foster; Teddy Riley

Michael Jackson chronology
The Essential Michael Jackson (2005)	Visionary: The Video Singles (2006)	Thriller 25 (2008)

Professional ratings
Review scores
Source	Rating
AllMusic	2.5/5 stars

Visionary: The Video Singles is a series of 20 DualDisc singles in limited edition by American singer and recording artist Michael Jackson. It was released in Europe between February 20, 2006, and June 26, 2006, and then released in North America as a box set on November 14, 2006 by Epic Records and Legacy Recordings.

When originally released, only the empty box and the "Thriller" single were released. Then a different single was released every week starting with "Don't Stop 'Til You Get Enough" and ending with "Blood on the Dance Floor". After 19 weeks, buyers would have the entire set. The limited edition cover artwork for the box set is a photomosaic using images from Jackson's career. Each single contains the title song, either a remix or b-side on the CD side, and its originally released music video on the DVD side. Audio for the video, and for the enhanced resolution music on the DVD side of the DualDisc, is PCM at 48 kHz. The Grammy and MTV Award-winning video for "Scream" was not part of the set.

== Track listing (DVD side) ==
- Details mentioned between parentheses for the n°2 tracks are from Wikipedia' sources. For the n°3 tracks they are mentioned on the majority of the singles.
- Tracks in n°2 and n°3 for the DVD side are respectively in n°1 and n°2 for the CD side.

"Don't Stop 'Til You Get Enough"
No.	Title	Length
1.	"Don't Stop 'Til You Get Enough" (Music Video)	4:11
2.	"Don't Stop 'Til You Get Enough" (7" Edit)	3:57
3.	"Don't Stop 'Til You Get Enough" (Original 12" Edit)	5:58

"Rock with You"
No.	Title	Length
1.	"Rock with You" (Music Video)	3:23
2.	"Rock with You" (7" Remix)	3:23
3.	"Rock with You" (Masters at Work Remix)	5:33

"Billie Jean"
No.	Title	Length
1.	"Billie Jean" (Music Video)	4:54
2.	"Billie Jean" (Album Version)	4:54
3.	"Billie Jean" (Original 12" Edit)	6:23

"Beat It"
No.	Title	Length
1.	"Beat It" (Music Video)	4:56
2.	"Beat It" (Album Version)	4:18
3.	"Beat It" (Moby's Sub Mix)	6:11

"Thriller"
No.	Title	Length
1.	"Thriller" (Music Video)	13:40
2.	"Thriller" (Remixed Short Version)	4:09
3.	"Thriller" (Album Version)	5:58

"Bad"
No.	Title	Length
1.	"Bad" (Music Video (Note: Short version.))	4:19
2.	"Bad" (7" Single Mix)	4:07
3.	"Bad" (Dance Extended Mix Includes "False Fade")	8:23

"The Way You Make Me Feel"
No.	Title	Length
1.	"The Way You Make Me Feel" (Music Video)	6:43
2.	"The Way You Make Me Feel" (7" Remix)	4:26
3.	"The Way You Make Me Feel" (Dance Extended Mix)	7:53

"Dirty Diana"
No.	Title	Length
1.	"Dirty Diana" (Music Video)	5:02
2.	"Dirty Diana" (Single Edit)	4:41
3.	"Dirty Diana" (Instrumental)	4:41

"Smooth Criminal"
No.	Title	Length
1.	"Smooth Criminal" (Music Video)	4:13
2.	"Smooth Criminal" (7" Version)	4:19
3.	"Smooth Criminal" (Extended Dance Mix)	7:49

"Leave Me Alone"
No.	Title	Length
1.	"Leave Me Alone" (Music Video)	4:39
2.	"Leave Me Alone" (Album Version)	4:39
3.	"Another Part of Me" (Extended Dance Mix)	6:20

"Black or White"
No.	Title	Length
1.	"Black or White" (Music Video)	11:00
2.	"Black or White" (Single Edit)	3:17
3.	"Black or White" (The Clivillés & Cole House Guitar Radio Mix)	3:49

"Remember the Time"
No.	Title	Length
1.	"Remember the Time" (Music Video)	9:15
2.	"Remember the Time" (7" Main Mix)	4:00
3.	"Remember the Time" (New Jack Jazz Radio Mix)	4:05

"In the Closet"
No.	Title	Length
1.	"In the Closet" (Music Video)	6:02
2.	"In the Closet" (7" Edit)	4:47
3.	"In the Closet" (Club Mix)	8:02

"Jam"
No.	Title	Length
1.	"Jam" (Music Video)	8:00
2.	"Jam" (7" Edit)	4:11
3.	"Jam" (12" Silky Mix)	6:28

"Heal the World"
No.	Title	Length
1.	"Heal the World" (Music Video)	7:30
2.	"Heal the World" (7" Edit)	4:34
3.	"Will You Be There" (Single Version)	5:52

"You Are Not Alone"
No.	Title	Length
1.	"You Are Not Alone" (Music Video)	5:45
2.	"You Are Not Alone" (Radio Edit)	4:34
3.	"You Are Not Alone" (Classic Club Mix)	7:36

"Earth Song"
No.	Title	Length
1.	"Earth Song" (Music Video)	6:43
2.	"Earth Song" (Radio Edit)	5:02
3.	"Earth Song" (Hani's Club Experience)	7:55

"They Don't Care About Us"
No.	Title	Length
1.	"They Don't Care About Us" (Music Video (Note: Brazilian (Olodum) version.))	7:16
2.	"They Don't Care About Us" (LP Edit)	4:09
3.	"They Don't Care About Us" (Love to Infinity's Walk in the Park Mix)	7:18

"Stranger in Moscow"
No.	Title	Length
1.	"Stranger in Moscow" (Music Video)	5:32
2.	"Stranger in Moscow" (Album Edit)	5:22
3.	"Stranger in Moscow" (Tee's In-House Club Mix)	6:54

"Blood on the Dance Floor"
No.	Title	Length
1.	"Blood on the Dance Floor" (Music Video)	4:16
2.	"Blood on the Dance Floor" (Album Version)	4:14
3.	"Blood on the Dance Floor" (Fire Island Vocal Mix)	8:58

== Release history ==
Country	Date
Europe	February 20, 2006
United States	November 14, 2006

== Charts (single details) ==
Note: original chart positions are in brackets

Date	Title	UK	Australia	Spain
February 20, 2006	"Thriller" (plus limited edition collector's box)	Ineligible to Chart (10)	55 (4)	1 (1)
February 20, 2006	"Don't Stop 'Til You Get Enough"	17 (3)	66 (1)	2
February 27, 2006	"Rock with You"	15 (7)	55 (4)	1
March 6, 2006	"Billie Jean"	11 (1)	58 (1)	1 (1)
March 13, 2006	"Beat It"	15 (3)	66 (2)	1
March 20, 2006	"Bad"	16 (3)	91 (4)	1 (1)
March 27, 2006	"The Way You Make Me Feel"	17 (3)	79 (5)	1 (2)
April 3, 2006	"Dirty Diana"	17 (4)	60 (26)	1 (22)
April 10, 2006	"Smooth Criminal"	19 (8)	88 (29)	1 (1)
April 17, 2006	"Leave Me Alone"	15 (2)	68 (37)	1 (5)
April 24, 2006	"Black or White"	18 (1)	56 (1)	2 (1)
May 1, 2006	"Remember the Time"	22 (3)	72 (6)	2 (3)
May 8, 2006	"In the Closet"	20 (8)	68 (5)	2 (9)
May 15, 2006	"Jam"	22 (13)	60 (11)	1
May 22, 2006	"Heal the World"	27 (2)	63 (20)	1
May 29, 2006	"You Are Not Alone"	30 (1)	65 (7)	1
June 5, 2006	"Earth Song"	34 (1)	67 (15)	1 (1)
June 12, 2006	"They Don't Care About Us"	26 (4)	75 (16)	2 (11)
June 19, 2006	"Stranger in Moscow"	22 (4)	65 (14)	1 (1)
June 26, 2006	"Blood on the Dance Floor"	19 (1)	(5)	1 (1)

== Others ==
=== Remix EP ===
Released on February 21, 2006, Visionary Remixes – EP is only available from the iTunes Store.

Visionary Remixes – EP
No.	Title	Length
1.	"Stranger in Moscow" (Hani's Num Club Mix)	10:18
2.	"In the Closet" (The Mission Mix)	9:24
3.	"Smooth Criminal" ("Annie" Mix)	5:36
4.	"This Time Around" (D.M. Mad Club Mix)	10:21

=== CD promo ===
1. "Thriller" (Remixed Short Version) – 4:09
2. "Don't Stop 'Til You Get Enough" (7' Edit) – 3:59
3. "Rock with You" (7' Edit) – 3:23
4. "Billie Jean" – 4:54
5. "Beat It" – 4:18
