= HIStory on Film, Volume II =

Video by Michael Jackson
- Released: May 20, 1997
- Recorded: 1979–1997
- Genre: Pop
- Length: 1:47:18
- Label: SMV Enterprises

Michael Jackson chronology
Video Greatest Hits – HIStory (1995)	HIStory on Film, Volume II (1997)	Number Ones (2003)

HIStory on Film, Volume II is a collection of music videos by Michael Jackson released by Sony Music Video Enterprises in May 1997. It contains the music videos belonging to Jackson's ninth studio album, HIStory: Past, Present and Future, Book I, and his first remix album, Blood on the Dance Floor: HIStory in the Mix, as well as content featured in Jackson's previous video collection, including "Thriller" and "Beat It".

== Track listing (DVD) ==
=== Side one ===
1. Programme start
2. HIStory teaser trailer – 3:58
3. "Billie Jean" – 5:05 (performance from Motown 25: Yesterday, Today and Forever) (Thriller, 1982)
4. "Beat It" – 4:56 (Thriller, 1982)
5. "Liberian Girl" – 5:43 (Bad, 1987)
6. "Smooth Criminal" – 9:47 (Bad, 1987)
7. 1995 MTV Video Music Awards performance – 15:27
  - "Don't Stop 'Til You Get Enough" / "The Way You Make Me Feel" / "Scream" / "Black or White" / "Billie Jean" (Contains Excerpts from "Jam", "Thriller" and "Beat It")
  - "Dangerous"
  - "You Are Not Alone"
8. "Thriller" – 13:43 (Thriller, 1982)

=== Side two ===
1. "Scream" (radio edit) (vocal duet between Michael Jackson and Janet Jackson, original video) – 5:00 (HIStory: Past, Present and Future, Book I, 1995)
2. "Childhood" (theme from "Free Willy 2") – 4:33 (HIStory: Past, Present and Future, Book I, 1995)
3. "You Are Not Alone" – 5:47 (HIStory: Past, Present and Future, Book I, 1995)
4. "Earth Song" – 7:49 (HIStory: Past, Present and Future, Book I, 1995)
5. "They Don't Care About Us" – 7:17 (Brazilian version) (HIStory: Past, Present and Future, Book I, 1995)
6. "Stranger in Moscow" – 5:38 (HIStory: Past, Present and Future, Book I, 1995)
7. "Blood on the Dance Floor" (Refugee Camp mix) – 5:40
8. "Brace Yourself" – 3:22

=== Notes ===
- The version of "Smooth Criminal" included is different from the one featured in Moonwalker, with a shorter interlude and different music at the start.
- "You Are Not Alone" features scenes with Michael depicted as an angel.
- "Earth Song" includes sound effects, such as the chainsaw, as well as a message at the end, describing the shooting of the film.
- After "Stranger in Moscow", a track entitled "MJ Megaremix" (10:36) was released only on the earliest VHS, LaserDisc, and VCD pressings of this collection. It was removed from the DVD format for unspecified reasons.

== DVD features ==
This refers to the UK Region 2 release. Other regions may vary.

- PCM Stereo
- Dolby Digital 5.1
- Instant lyrics for chapter access (can be on/off)

== Intros ==
Before each video starts, an intro with the title of the video is shown. (Two of the videos lack intros: "Teaser" and "Brace Yourself".)

== Certifications ==
Certifications and sales for HIStory on Film, Volume II
Region	Certification	Certified units/sales
Argentina (CAPIF)	Platinum	8,000^{^}
Australia (ARIA)	7× Platinum	105,000^{^}
Brazil (Pro-Música Brasil)	Gold	25,000^{*}
France (SNEP)	3× Platinum	60,000^{*}
Germany (BVMI)	Platinum	50,000^{^}
Mexico (AMPROFON)	5× Platinum+Gold	110,000^{^}
New Zealand (RMNZ)	Gold	2,500^{^}
Spain (Promusicae)	Platinum	25,000^{^}
United Kingdom (BPI)	2× Platinum	100,000^{^}
United States (RIAA)	6× Platinum	600,000^{^}
^{*} Sales figures based on certification alone.^{^} Shipments figures based on certification alone.
