= You Are Not Alone =

1995 single by Michael Jackson

- Standard artwork (US CD single pictured)

Single by Michael Jackson

from the album HIStory: Past, Present and Future, Book I
- B-side: "Scream Louder" (Flyte Tyme remix)
- Released: July 28, 1995
- Recorded: November 1994
- Studio: Chicago Recording Company (Chicago, Illinois)
- Genre: Pop; R&B
- Length: 5:45 (album version); 4:54 (single edit); 4:34 (radio edit); 6:03 (extended version)
- Label: Epic; Sony; MJJ
- Songwriter: Robert Kelly
- Producers: R. Kelly; Michael Jackson

Michael Jackson singles chronology
"Scream" / "Childhood" (1995)	"You Are Not Alone" (1995)	"Earth Song" (1995)

Music video
- "You Are Not Alone" on YouTube

Audio sample
- "You Are Not Alone": file; help

"You Are Not Alone" is a song by American singer and songwriter Michael Jackson from his ninth studio album, HIStory: Past, Present and Future, Book I (1995). It was released on July 28, 1995, by Epic and Sony, as the second single from the album.

An R&B ballad, "You Are Not Alone" was written by R. Kelly for Jackson in response to difficult times in his own personal life. Kelly sent a demo tape to Jackson, who liked the song and decided to produce it with him in his Chicago studio. Jackson's interest in the song was also linked to events in his personal life. The music video, which was directed by Wayne Isham and featured Jackson and his then-wife Lisa Marie Presley, features scenes of semi-nudity.

"You Are Not Alone" received generally positive reviews and was the recipient of Grammy and American Music Award nominations. It holds a Guinness World Record as the first song to debut at number one on the US Billboard Hot 100, and was certified platinum by the RIAA. It also topped the charts in Austria, Belgium, France, Ireland, New Zealand, Romania, Scotland, Spain, Switzerland and the United Kingdom. It was re-released in 2006 as part of Jackson's box set Visionary: The Video Singles, and re-entered at number 30 in the UK Singles Chart.

"You Are Not Alone" was Jackson's thirteenth and final number-one US single. After his death in June 2009, Kelly paid tribute by including a version of the song created by himself as a hidden track on his album Love Letter (2010). In 2011, a clip of the song was remixed with the Jackson song "I Just Can't Stop Loving You"; the final "Immortal Version" was released on the Immortal album.

== Production and composition ==
"You Are Not Alone" is a pop and R&B ballad about love and isolation. The song was written by R. Kelly and produced by Kelly and Jackson. Kelly wrote the song after losing close people in his life. Kelly was delighted to be able to work with his idol, explaining "I was psyched ... I feel I could have done his whole album. Not being selfish. I was just that geeked about it. It was an experience out of this world ... It's amazing to know that five years ago I was writing songs in a basement in the ghetto and now I'm writing for Michael Jackson ... I'd be a fool not to say it's a dream come true." Jackson contacted Kelly to see if he had any material available. Kelly forwarded a tape recording of the song and Jackson then agreed to work with Kelly on the piece. On the tape sent to Jackson, Kelly sung "You Are Not Alone" mimicking Jackson's vocal style, explaining, "I think I am him. I become him. I want him to feel that as well." Jackson found the interpretation amusing. They spent the last week of November 1994 together in the studio working on the track.

Jackson explained that he instantly liked the song, but listened to it twice before making his final decision. Although the song was written by Kelly, Jackson was adamant that the production should be a collaborative effort among the two musicians. The tape sent to him had no harmony or modulations, so Jackson added a choir in the final portion and added a sense of climax and structure to the final piece. Sheet music for "You Are Not Alone" is in the key of B major, with the last two choruses in D♭ major and E♭ major, with a tempo of 60 beats per minute, making it one of Jackson's slowest songs.

== Plagiarism lawsuit ==
In 1993, Edward and Daniel van Passel wrote the score to a song titled "If We Can Start All Over". It was registered with the Belgian Society of Authors, Composers and Publishers (SABAM) that year. The score has never been commercially released, and can only be found as sheet music, which does not contain information about the timbre, rhythm or harmony.

When "You Are Not Alone" became a worldwide success, the van Passel brothers approached SABAM saying it was similar to their song. The internal committee noted similarities between the melodies and recommended pursuing a lawsuit against Kelly and Zomba Record Holding Holland BV. The brothers applied to the Court of Leuven for an injunction on October 18, 1995. The Belgian Court rejected the claim of plagiarism on January 20, 2003, finding that the 43.46% similarity between the two melodies was a coincidence. The van Passel brothers submitted an appeal.

On September 4, 2007, the Court of Appeal in Brussels reversed the 2003 ruling, based on the fact that Kelly's earliest evidence of writing "You Are Not Alone" was August 1995, 21 months after the brothers had registered their score for "If We Can Start All Over". The court concluded that it was possible that Kelly had accessed the score and developed this into "You Are Not Alone". Kelly maintained that he never met or heard of the van Passel brothers. The court also stated that the van Passel brothers "did not create their work merely in order to register it with SABAM and put it in a drawer, but at least informed third parties of the existence of their composition".

Belgium maintains a ban on all radio and television broadcasts of the "You Are Not Alone" song and music video. Vendors found with copies face fines of €1,000 for each copy of the song. The van Passel brothers have gained recognition as co-writers of the melody for "You Are Not Alone" in Belgium.

== Critical reception ==
Professional ratings
Review scores
Source	Rating
AllMusic	3/5 stars

"You Are Not Alone" received positive reception from music critics. In 2008, Stephen Thomas Erlewine of AllMusic wrote that it was among Jackson's best songs, calling it seductive. Steve Baltin from Cash Box described it as a "weepy ballad". In his weekly UK chart commentary in Dotmusic, James Masterton said that it "probably ranks as one of the most beautiful songs Michael Jackson has ever recorded". Pan-European magazine Music & Media wrote, "A far cry from "Scream", Jackson undergoes a gigantic mood swing here. Sad as he is, the vibrato in his vocals perfectly complements the moody ballad." A reviewer from Music Week rated it five out of five, writing, "Barely a yelp or gulp to be had on this dead simple R Kelly-penned and produced ballad. Not the strongest slowie on the album but a lot of wayward fans will be hankering after some no-frills old style Jackson. A biggie." The R&B critic and journalist Nelson George described the song as lovely and supple. Jon Pareles of The New York Times felt it was the only conventional love song on the new material on HIStory. He compared it to Mariah Carey's song "Hero" and said it "sounds like a surefire hit". Mark Sutherland from NME viewed it as a "syrupy ballad". James Hunter of Rolling Stone wrote that "the excellent current single 'Scream' or the first-rate R&B ballad 'You Are Not Alone'—manage to link the incidents of Jackson's recent past to universal concepts, like injustice or isolation. When he bases his music in the bluntness of hip-hop, Jackson sketches funky scenarios denouncing greed, blanket unreliability and false accusation".

Writer and journalist J. Randy Taraborrelli wrote of the song in 2004, "[it] remains among Michael's best songs ... On listening to 'You Are Not Alone', one wonders how many times Michael tried to tell himself, during his most desperate and anguished times, that he did have support in his life, from a higher power, or even friends and family, whether he actually believed it or not". Fred Shuster of the Daily News of Los Angeles described it as the best song on the album. Conversely, while Steve Holsey of Michigan Chronicle gave the album a positive review, he described the song as the worst on the album, calling Kelly's lyrics "trite" and below Jackson's standard. Robert Christgau of Blender latered call it "quietly yucky" while pop music critic Bill Wyman of New York called it "drony and unpleasant". Revisiting "You Are Not Alone" in 2022, Tom Breihan of Stereogum described the song as "thin gruel" and as a "sort of generic sad ballad", but said Jackson's vocals were "as tender and reassuring as ever". "You Are Not Alone" received an American Music Award nomination and a Grammy nomination both for "Best Pop Vocal Performance".

== Chart performance ==
Commercially, "You Are Not Alone" remains one of Jackson's best selling singles and it is also his 13th and final number-one song. It holds the Guinness World Record for the first song ever to debut at number one on the US Billboard Hot 100 chart. It was also Jackson's last number one single on the chart. It debuted at number one with first week sales of 120,000 copies. The song was certified platinum by the RIAA and sold one million copies domestically. It broke the record set by his previous double A-side single "Scream" and "Childhood", which was the first song in the 37-year history of Billboard to debut at number five—where it peaked. It peaked at number one in the UK after a debut at number three in the prior week. The song also reached number one in Belgium, France, New Zealand, Spain and Switzerland. In Canada it peaked at number two. It became a top ten hit in every major market.

== Music video ==
Presley leans down towards her husband in the temple scene of the music video.

The music video for "You Are Not Alone" was directed by American director Wayne Isham and was released to ABC, MTV and BET on July 28, 1995. It begins with a large number of paparazzi taking photographs of Jackson. The plot then centers around two locations: a temple where Jackson appears in an affectionate semi-nude scene with his then-wife, Lisa Marie Presley, and a theater where Jackson performs the song to an empty hall. Jackson also appears alone in other locations such as deserts and along tide pools. The slightly extended version that appeared on HIStory on Film, Volume II was notable for scenes where special effects were used to give Jackson white, feathery, almost angelic wings. Several of these scenes included Jackson's side having been pierced by an arrow. The other version of the video is included on Number Ones and Michael Jackson's Vision. The temple scenes were a homage to Maxfield Parrish's 1922 painting Daybreak. The theater scenes were filmed at the Pantages Theatre, in Los Angeles.

== Live performances ==
Jackson first performed "You Are Not Alone" at the 1995 Soul Train Music Awards, and also at the 1995 MTV Video Music Awards. At the latter awards ceremony, the song was performed without the second verse. Jackson then performed the song at the Royal Brunei concert in 1996 where it was performed as a complete song. Jackson also performed it during the HIStory World Tour as a complete song, during which one girl was allowed to dance with him on stage, similar to the Soul Train Music Awards performance. Jackson's next and final performance of "You Are Not Alone" was at the MJ & Friends concert in Munich on June 27, 1999.

Diana Ross recorded a version of this song on her international-only released album, Voice of Love produced by Nick Martinelli. Ross would also close her successful 2010–12 More Today Than Yesterday: The Greatest Hits Tour with this song as a tribute to Jackson.

== Track listings ==
- CD single
1. "You Are Not Alone" – 4:54
2. "Scream Louder" (Flyte Tyme remix) – 5:30
- Cassette single
1. "You Are Not Alone" (album edit) – 4:56
2. "Scream Louder" (Flyte Tyme remix) – 5:30
- 12-inch single
1. "You Are Not Alone" (Jon B. main remix) – 6:55
2. "You Are Not Alone" (Franctified club mix) – 10:09
3. "Rock with You" (Frankie's Favorite club mix) – 7:45
4. "Rock with You" (Masters at Work remix) – 5:30
- Canadian/United States
1. "You Are Not Alone" – 4:56
2. "You Are Not Alone" (radio edit) – 4:34
3. "You Are Not Alone" (Franctified club mix) – 10:40
4. "Scream Louder" (Flyte Tyme remix) – 5:30
5. "MJ Megaremix" – 10:33
- Japan single
1. "You Are Not Alone" – 4:56
2. "You Are Not Alone" (radio edit) – 4:34
3. "You Are Not Alone" (Franctified club mix) – 10:40
4. "You Are Not Alone" (Franctified club mix edit) – 7:40
5. "You Are Not Alone" (Jon B. main mix) – 6:55
6. "You Are Not Alone" (Jon B. Padapella mix) – 6:55
- Austria single
1. "You Are Not Alone" – 4:56
2. "You Are Not Alone" (radio edit) – 4:34
3. "You Are Not Alone" (Franctified club mix) – 10:40
4. "You Are Not Alone" (classic club mix) – 7:40
5. "You Are Not Alone" (Jon B. main mix) – 6:55
6. "You Are Not Alone" (Jon B. Padapella mix) – 6:55
7. "MJ Medley Aus Dem Viva" – 4:59
- Netherlands single
1. "You Are Not Alone" – 4:56
2. "You Are Not Alone" (radio edit) – 4:34
3. "You Are Not Alone" (Franctified club mix) – 10:40
4. "You Are Not Alone" (classic club mix) – 7:40
5. "You Are Not Alone" (Jon B. main mix) – 6:55
6. "You Are Not Alone" (Jon B. Padapella mix) – 6:55
7. "Magic Michael Jackson Mix" – 4:26

== Personnel ==
- Produced by R. Kelly and Michael Jackson
- Recorded and mixed by Bruce Swedien
- Michael Jackson – lead and background vocals, vocal and rhythm arrangements
- R. Kelly and Steve Porcaro – synthesizers and keyboards
- R. Kelly – background vocals
- Peter Mokran, Andrew Scheps and Steve Porcaro – synthesizer programming

== Charts ==
=== Weekly charts ===
Weekly chart performance for "You Are Not Alone"
Chart (1995–2009)	Peak position
Australia (ARIA)	7
Austria (Ö3 Austria Top 40)	2
Belgium (Ultratop 50 Flanders)	3
Belgium (Ultratop 50 Wallonia)	1
Canada (Canadian Hot Digital Songs)	23
Canada Top Singles (RPM)	11
Canada Adult Contemporary (RPM)	3
Canada Dance/Urban (RPM)	1
Canada Retail Singles (The Record)	1
Canada Contemporary Hit Radio (The Record)	6
Denmark (IFPI)	2
Denmark (Tracklisten)	33
El Salvador (UPI)	1
Europe (European Hot 100)	1
Europe (European Dance Radio)	1
Europe (European Hit Radio)	1
Finland (Suomen virallinen lista)	10
France (SNEP)	1
France Download Chart (SNEP)	1
Germany (GfK)	4
Hungary (Mahasz)	4
Iceland (Íslenski Listinn Topp 40)	8
Ireland (IRMA)	1
Italy (FIMI)	5
Italy (Musica e dischi)	3
Italy Airplay (Music & Media)	1
Netherlands (Dutch Top 40)	6
Netherlands (Single Top 100)	6
New Zealand (Recorded Music NZ)	1
Norway (VG-lista)	9
Panama (UPI)	2
Poland Airplay (Music & Media)	7
Romania (Romanian Top 100)	1
Scottish Singles Sales (Official Charts)	1
Spain (Promusicae)	1
Sweden (Sverigetopplistan)	2
Switzerland (Schweizer Hitparade)	1
UK Singles (OCC)	1
UK Airplay (Music Week)	3
US Billboard Hot 100	1
US Billboard Hot Digital Songs	17
US Adult Contemporary (Billboard)	7
US Adult Pop Airplay (Billboard)	8
US Hot R&B/Hip-Hop Songs (Billboard)	1
US Pop Airplay (Billboard)	4
US Rhythmic Airplay (Billboard)	1
US Cash Box Top 100	1

=== Year-end charts ===
Year-end chart performance for "You Are Not Alone"
Chart (1995)	Position
Australia (ARIA)	10
Austria (Ö3 Austria Top 40)	27
Belgium (Ultratop 50 Flanders)	33
Belgium (Ultratop 50 Wallonia)	11
Brazil (Crowley)	20
Canada Top Singles (RPM)	96
Canada Adult Contemporary (RPM)	18
Europe (Eurochart Hot 100)	1
Europe (European Hit Radio)	7
France (SNEP)	10
Germany (Media Control)	30
Iceland (Íslenski Listinn Topp 40)	31
Netherlands (Dutch Top 40)	13
Netherlands (Single Top 100)	26
New Zealand (RIANZ)	15
Sweden (Topplistan)	27
Switzerland (Schweizer Hitparade)	20
UK Singles (OCC)	8
UK Airplay (Music Week)	30
US Billboard Hot 100	21
US Adult Contemporary (Billboard)	35
US Hot R&B Singles (Billboard)	33
US Maxi-Singles Sales (Billboard)	42
US Cash Box Top 100	13

=== Decade-end charts ===
Chart (1990–1999)	Rank
Austria (Ö3 Austria Top 40)	55

== Certifications ==
Certifications for "You Are Not Alone"
Region	Certification	Certified units/sales
Australia (ARIA)	Platinum	70,000^{^}
Austria (IFPI Austria)	Gold	25,000^{*}
Belgium (BRMA)	Gold	25,000^{*}
Canada (Music Canada)	Platinum	80,000^{‡}
France (SNEP)	Gold	250,000^{*}
Germany (BVMI)	Gold	250,000^{^}
New Zealand (RMNZ)	Platinum	30,000^{‡}
Switzerland (IFPI Switzerland)	Gold	25,000^{^}
United Kingdom (BPI) Physical sales	Platinum	600,000^{^}
United Kingdom (BPI) Digital Sales	Platinum	600,000^{‡}
United States (RIAA)	Platinum	1,000,000^{^}
^{*} Sales figures based on certification alone.^{^} Shipments figures based on certification alone.^{‡} Sales+streaming figures based on certification alone.

== Release history ==
Release dates for "You Are Not Alone"
Region	Date	Label(s)	Ref.
United States	July 25, 1995 (radio)	Epic	
United States	August 15, 1995 (commercial)	Epic	
United Kingdom	August 21, 1995	Epic	
Japan	October 19, 1995	Epic Japan	

== The X Factor UK 2009 finalists version ==
"You Are Not Alone"

Single by The X Factor Contestants 2009
- Released: November 15, 2009
- Genre: Pop; R&B
- Label: Syco
- Songwriter: R. Kelly

The X Factor contestants singles chronology
"Hero" (2008)	"You Are Not Alone" (2009)	"Heroes" (2010)

The top twelve acts from the sixth series of TV talent show The X Factor in the United Kingdom released a cover version of the song on November 15, 2009, in aid of Great Ormond Street Hospital. The finalists premiered the song live on the November 15 edition of the programme; the single was available for digital download that day and a physical release followed the day after. The release of the song follows a similar occurrence a year earlier, when the top twelve contestants from the fifth series released a cover version of Mariah Carey's "Hero" in aid of Help for Heroes and raised over £1 million.

=== Charts ===
Weekly chart performance for "You Are Not Alone"
Chart (2009)	Peak position
Ireland (IRMA)	1
Scottish Singles Sales (Official Charts)	1
UK Singles (Official Charts)	1

=== Year-end charts ===
Year-end chart performance for "You Are Not Alone"
Chart (2009)	Position
UK Singles (OCC)	28

== R. Kelly version ==
"You Are Not Alone"

Song by R. Kelly

from the album Love Letter
- Released: December 14, 2010
- Recorded: 2009
- Genre: R&B; soul
- Length: 4:29
- Label: RCA
- Songwriter: Kelly
- Producer: Kelly

R. Kelly recorded his own version of the song and put it on his 2010 album Love Letter, he recorded it as a tribute to Jackson following his death. The song was included as a hidden bonus track on the album, shown as the final song on the album's track list.

=== Track listing ===
Digital single from Love Letter

No.	Title	Writer(s)	Producer(s)	Length
15.	"You Are Not Alone"	R. Kelly	R. Kelly	4:29

== Bibliography ==
- Brown, Jake (2004). Your Body's Calling Me. Amber Books Publishing. ISBN 0-9727519-5-5.
- Campbell, Lisa (1995). Michael Jackson: The King of Pops Darkest Hour. Branden. ISBN 0-8283-2003-9.
- George, Nelson (2004). Michael Jackson: The Ultimate Collection. Sony BMG.
- Taraborrelli, J. Randy (2004). The Magic and the Madness. Terra Alta, WV: Headline. ISBN 0-330-42005-4.
