= Video Greatest Hits – HIStory =

Video by Michael Jackson
- Released: 1995
- Length: 1:29:12
- Label: SMV Enterprises

Michael Jackson chronology
Dangerous: The Short Films (1993)	Video Greatest Hits – HIStory (1995)	HIStory on Film, Volume II (1997)

Video Greatest Hits – HIStory is a collection of Michael Jackson's music videos (excluding "Man in the Mirror" and "She's Out of My Life") relative at the first disc of the double album HIStory released initially on VHS, Video CD (in Asia only) and LaserDisc in 1995 by Sony Music Video Enterprises, and then on DVD in 2001. The DVD version contains extended versions of some videos in place of edited transmitted versions previously included on the VHS and LaserDisc versions, a Dolby 5.1 Surround mix and a discography.

== Track listing ==
1. "Brace Yourself" ("O fortuna") – 3:22
2. "Billie Jean" (Thriller, January 1983) – 4:55
  - Directed by Steve Barron
3. "The Way You Make Me Feel" (short version on VHS) (Bad, October 1987) – 9:23
  - Directed by Joe Pytka
4. "Black or White" (original version on VHS and LaserDisc, racist graffiti version on DVD) (Note: In the DVD version (which shows the original long version of the video), Jackson smashes the windows of a car and showcases on which are drawn symbols of intolerance.) (Dangerous, November 1991) – 11:00
  - Directed by John Landis
5. "Rock with You" (Off the Wall, November 1979) – 3:23
  - Directed by Bruce Gowers
6. "Bad" (short version on VHS) (Bad, September 1987) – 18:14
  - Directed by Martin Scorsese
7. "Thriller" (Thriller, December 1983) – 13:43
  - Directed by John Landis
8. "Beat It" (Thriller, February 1983) – 4:56
  - Directed by Bob Giraldi
9. "Remember the Time" (Dangerous, January 1992) – 9:17
  - Directed by John Singleton
10. "Don't Stop 'Til You Get Enough" (Off the Wall, October 1979) – 4:12
  - Directed by Nick Saxton
11. "Heal the World" (Dangerous, November 1992) – 6:22
  - Directed by Joe Pytka
12. Credits ("Heal the World" instrumental)

== Certifications ==
Region	Certification	Certified units/sales
Australia (ARIA)	5× Platinum	75,000^{^}
Austria (IFPI Austria)	Gold	5,000^{*}
Japan (RIAJ)	Gold	100,000^{^}
Germany (BVMI)	3× Gold	75,000^{^}
Spain (Promusicae)	Platinum	25,000^{^}
United States (RIAA)	9× Platinum	900,000^{^}
^{*} Sales figures based on certification alone.^{^} Shipments figures based on certification alone.
