= One More Chance (Michael Jackson song) =

Single by Michael Jackson

from the album Number Ones
- Released: November 22, 2003
- Recorded: 2003
- Studio: The Hit Factory (New York City)
- Genre: R&B; pop
- Length: 3:50
- Label: Epic; Sony
- Songwriter: R. Kelly
- Producers: R. Kelly; Michael Jackson

Michael Jackson singles chronology
"What More Can I Give" (2003)	"One More Chance" (2003)	"The Girl Is Mine 2008" (2008)

Music video
- "One More Chance" on YouTube

"One More Chance" is a song by American singer-songwriter Michael Jackson. It was written by R. Kelly and included on Jackson's compilation album Number Ones, released on November 22, 2003. The song was later included on the Australian, French, Swedish and Indonesian editions of King of Pop and the Japanese limited edition of The Ultimate Collection box set.

"One More Chance" was the last original single released during Jackson's lifetime. It received a positive reception from music critics and reached the top ten in Italy. It also reached number 5 in the UK. The song also managed to reach the top 30 in Germany, the Netherlands, and Switzerland, and peaked at number 83 on the US Billboard Hot 100.

This was the third song recorded by Jackson titled "One More Chance", the first two having been in 1970 and 1984 for the ABC and Victory albums respectively, while a member of the Jacksons, although the 1984 song has Michael's brother Randy singing the lead vocals.

== Music video ==
Directed by Nick Brandt, Jackson had been shooting the music video late into the night of November 17, 2003 at CMX Studios in Las Vegas, Nevada, but production was stopped following a raid on the Neverland Ranch by the Santa Barbara County Sheriff's Office in relation to allegations of child sex abuse by Jackson. The single was instead promoted using a montage video of highlights from Jackson's career.

On October 13, 2010, the official website of Michael Jackson announced that the music video would be finished with what footage they had available, and was released in a deluxe DVD box set Michael Jackson's Vision on November 22, 2010. A rough two-minute cut of the video leaked online on November 15, 2010. On November 19, 2010, the full length of the video premiered on Jackson's official website. As with the song being the last brand new single released during his lifetime, the music video is also Jackson's last music video and the only with new footage to be released posthumously. The video begins with a group of people walking onto a stage. The curtain opens to reveal a cafe that Jackson starts dancing in with the group of people watching, revealing they were what brought him the same joy and vice-versa.

== Track listing ==
US 12" vinyl

- A1. "One More Chance" (Metro Remix) – 3:50
- A2. "One More Chance" (Paul Oakenfold Urban Mix) – 3:37
- B1. "One More Chance" (Paul Oakenfold Mix) – 3:50
- B2. "One More Chance" (Ron G Club Remix) – 4:00
- B3. "One More Chance" (album version) – 3:50

US CD maxi single

1. "One More Chance" (album version) – 3:50
2. "One More Chance" (Paul Oakenfold Mix) – 3:50
3. "One More Chance" (Metro Remix) – 3:50
4. "One More Chance" (Ron G Club Remix) – 4:00
5. "One More Chance" (Paul Oakenfold Urban Mix) – 3:37

US 12" promo vinyl

- A1. "One More Chance" (album version) – 3:50
- A2. "One More Chance" (Ron G Club Remix) – 4:00
- B1. "One More Chance" (Paul Oakenfold Urban Mix) – 3:37
- B2. "One More Chance" (Paul Oakenfold Mix) – 3:50
- B3. "One More Chance" (Night & Day R&B Mix) – 3:36

Canada CD single

1. "One More Chance" (album version) – 3:50
2. "One More Chance" (Ron G. Rhythmic Mix) – 3:50
3. "One More Chance" (Paul Oakenfold Pop Mix) – 3:45

European CD maxi single

1. "One More Chance" (album version) – 3:50
2. "One More Chance" (Paul Oakenfold Mix) – 3:50
3. "One More Chance" (Metro Remix) – 3:50
4. "One More Chance" (Ron G Club Remix) – 4:00

European promo CD single

1. "One More Chance" – 3:50

UK CD single (CD1)

1. "One More Chance" (album version) – 3:50
2. "One More Chance" (Paul Oakenfold Urban Mix) – 3:37

UK CD single (CD2)

1. "One More Chance" (album version) – 3:50
2. "One More Chance" (Paul Oakenfold Mix) – 3:50
3. "One More Chance" (Metro Remix) – 3:50
4. "One More Chance" (Ron G Club Remix) – 4:00

UK promo 12" vinyl

- A1. "One More Chance" (Paul Oakenfold Urban Mix) – 3:37
- B1. "One More Chance" (Ron G Club Remix) – 4:00
- B2. "One More Chance" (album version) – 3:50

UK 12" vinyl

- A1. "One More Chance" (Metro Remix) – 3:50
- A2. "One More Chance" (Paul Oakenfold Urban Mix) – 3:37
- B1. "One More Chance" (Paul Oakenfold Mix) – 3:50
- B2. "One More Chance" (Ron G Club Remix) – 4:00
- B3. "One More Chance" (album version) – 3:50

UK limited edition 12" vinyl picture disc

- A. "One More Chance" (album version) – 3:50
- B. "Billie Jean" (album version) – 4:54

Germany mini CD

1. "One More Chance" (album version) – 3:50
2. "Ben" (2003 live edit) – 2:45

== Official remixes ==
- R. Kelly Remix
- Ron G Club Mix
- Ron G. Rhythmic Mix
- Slang Remix
- Slang Electro Remix
- Metro Remix
- Ford Remix
- Ford Extended Remix
- Paul Oakenfold Urban Mix
- Paul Oakenfold Mix
- Paul Oakenfold Pop Mix
- Night and Day Remix

== Credits and personnel ==
- Written and arranged by R. Kelly
- Produced by R. Kelly and Michael Jackson
- Lead vocals by Michael Jackson
- Background vocals by Michael Jackson and R. Kelly
- Vocals recorded by Brad Buxer and John Nettlesby
- Mixed by Șerban Ghenea
- Digital editing by John Nettlesby
- String arrangement by Michael Jackson
- Guitar by Donnie Lyle
- Additional Pro-Tools by John Hanes
- Assistant engineer: Tim Roberts
- Mastered by Bernie Grundman

== Charts ==
Weekly chart performance for "One More Chance"
Chart (2003–2004)	Peak position
Austria (Ö3 Austria Top 40)	58
Belgium (Ultratop 50 Flanders)	30
Belgium (Ultratop 50 Wallonia)	37
France (SNEP)	44
Germany (GfK)	29
Hungary (Editors' Choice Top 40)	36
Ireland (IRMA)	21
Italy (FIMI)	7
Netherlands (Dutch Top 40)	23
Netherlands (Single Top 100)	28
Scotland Singles (OCC)	32
Spain (Promusicae)	7
Switzerland (Schweizer Hitparade)	24
UK Singles (OCC)	5
UK Hip Hop/R&B (OCC)	1
US Billboard Hot 100	83
US Urban AC (Radio & Records)	11
US Urban (Radio & Records)	41

== Release history ==
Release dates and formats for "One More Chance"
Region	Date	Format(s)	Label(s)	Ref.
United States	October 27, 2003	Rhythmic radio; Urban contemporary radio; Urban adult contemporary radio	Epic	
United Kingdom	November 15, 2003	CD single	Epic	
Germany	November 24, 2003	CD single; Limited edition 12" picture vinyl	Epic	
