= Rock with You =

1979 single by Michael Jackson

- Artwork for 2000s European reissue, also used for early German and Dutch singles

Single by Michael Jackson

from the album Off the Wall
- B-side: "Working Day and Night"
- Released: October 1979
- Recorded: December 1978
- Genre: Disco; funk; pop
- Length: 3:38 (album version); 3:20 (single/video version)
- Label: Epic
- Songwriter: Rod Temperton
- Producer: Quincy Jones

Michael Jackson singles chronology
"Don't Stop 'Til You Get Enough" (1979)	"Rock with You" (1979)	"Off the Wall" (1979)

Alternative release(s)
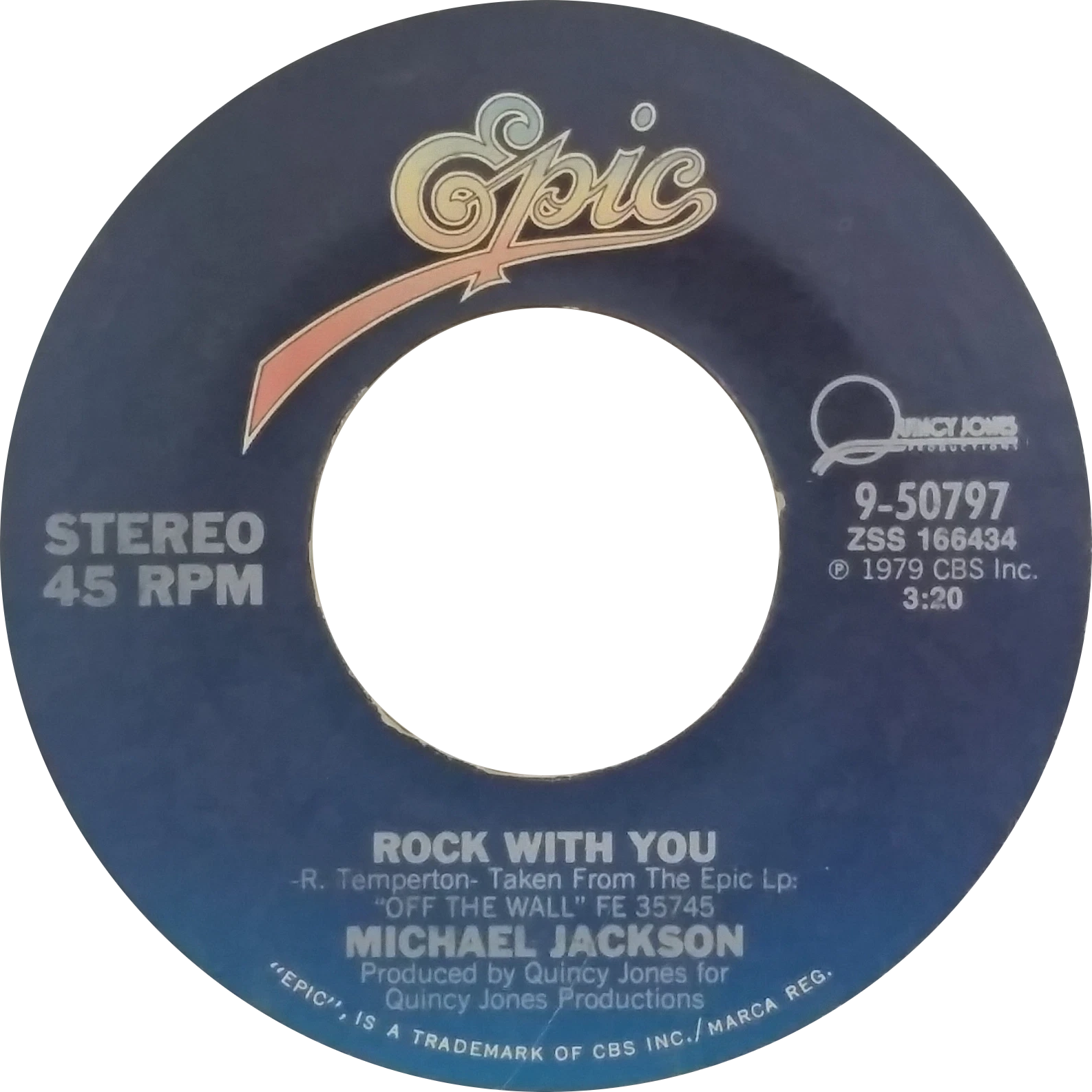
- Side A of US seven-inch vinyl single

Music video
- "Rock with You" on YouTube

"Rock with You" is a song by the American singer Michael Jackson, written by Rod Temperton and produced by Quincy Jones. It was first offered to Karen Carpenter, while she was working on her first solo album, but she turned it down. It was released in October 1979 by Epic Records as the second single from Jackson's fifth solo studio album Off the Wall (1979). It was also the third number-one hit of the 1980s, a decade in which the pop singles chart would quickly be dominated by Jackson.

It reached number one on both the US pop (Jackson's third number-one on this chart) and R&B charts (Jackson's second number one on that chart). It spent a total of four weeks at the top position on the former chart from January 19 to February 9, 1980, and five weeks (from January 5 to February 9, 1980) on the latter chart. According to Billboard, the song was the fourth biggest single of 1980. It is also considered one of the last hits of the disco era.

In Europe, the song was released as the third single from Off the Wall, released on 1 February 1980.

"Rock with You" was re-released as a single on February 27, 2006, as part of the Visionary: The Video Singles box set. In 2021, Rolling Stone placed it at number 354 on its list of The 500 Greatest Songs of All Time·

== Composition ==
"Rock with You" is a disco, funk and pop song.

== Critical reception ==
The track received generally positive reviews from music critics. J. Edward Keyes of Rolling Stone said "What's remarkable about 'Rock with You' is how unobtrusive it is: a silky string section and barely-there twitch of guitar — Michael doesn't even hit the word 'Rock' all that hard — he just glides over it, preferring to charm with a wink and a smile rather than with aggression or ferocity." Steven Hyden called it his "favorite song", and noted the line "Girrrrrrl, when you dance, there's a magic that must be love" as being "the most purely joyful moment [Hyden] has ever heard in a pop song". AllMusic highlighted the song on the album itself. Robert Christgau called it a "smooth ballad". Cash Box praised the production, calling the song a "soft, classy number" with "multi-tracked harmonies," "a modified dance beat," "shimmering flute tones and jazzy guitar work."

== Music video ==
A music video was released for the song, using the shorter single version. It features Michael in a sparkly sequined suit singing the song with a bright laser behind him. The video was directed by Bruce Gowers and filmed in 1979 at the 800 Stage in Los Angeles, California.

The music video was included on the video albums: Video Greatest Hits – HIStory, Number Ones and Michael Jackson's Vision.

== Live performances ==
Michael Jackson first performed the song on the Jacksons' Destiny World Tour on the second leg. He performed the song on the Jacksons' Triumph Tour and Victory Tour. He performed the song on his solo world tour Bad. He also performed the song during the HIStory World Tour, as a part of the Off the Wall medley (also featuring "Off the Wall" and "Don't Stop Til' You Get Enough") in certain concerts. "Rock with You" was rehearsed for the Dangerous World Tour, but was not performed. Jackson also would have performed it for the This Is It concert series, but the shows were canceled, due to his sudden death.

== Mixes ==
- Original LP version – 3:39
  - This "classic" version was only released on initial runs of the LP record and cassette, as well as certain CD pressings manufactured in Japan, up to and including a Japanese-market version released in 1991. It was replaced by the full version of the 7" remix on later LP pressings and all other CD editions. The original version was later remastered and released on the "French Fans' Selection" deluxe box set edition of King of Pop.
- 7" remix video edit – 3:23
  - The "remix" was used for the single and to underscore the video. The remix re-pans the guitar, and adds more strings, horns, and hand claps in the chorus. An edit was made to the middle musical bridge by adding fingersnaps and shortening it from two parts to just one.
- 7" version – 3:39
  - This is the same as the 7" remix, but with the musical bridge left intact. This version appears on later pressings of the album.
- Extended version – 4:57
  - Available only on the Japanese 12" promo, "Rock with You / Robin Hood". The latter song was recorded by Fox and the Promes.
- Masters at Work remix – 5:29
- Frankie's Favorite club mix – 7:49
- Frankie Knuckles radio mix – 3:50
  - The Masters at Work remix and Frankie Knuckles remixes all contain previously unheard vocals and ad-libs not heard on the original album version. This is because the remixers were given access to the master tapes of the song to produce their remix. The master tapes contained additional vocals and cuts that didn't make it onto the original album version.
- Live 1981 (3:55)
  - The live version, taken from the 1981 album The Jacksons Live!, was included on the UK 12" "Wanna Be Startin' Somethin'" single in 1983.
- Live 1988 (4:05)
  - The live version, included in the deluxe edition of Bad 25 and on the DVD Live at Wembley July 16, 1988, was recorded during one of the shows at Wembley Stadium during the Bad tour.

== Track listing and formats ==
European 7" vinyl single (EPC 8206)

- A. "Rock with You" – 3:38
- B. "Get on the Floor" – 4:44

Netherlands 12" vinyl single (EPC 12.8206)

- A. "Rock with You" – 3:20
- B1. "You Can't Win" – 7:17
- B2. "Get on the Floor" – 4:44

UK 12" vinyl single (EPC 13 8206)

- A. "Rock with You" – 3:20
- B1: "You Can't Win" – 7:17
- B2: "Get on the Floor" – 4:44

US 7" vinyl single (9-50797)

- A. "Rock with You" – 3:20
- B. "Working Day and Night" – 4:55

Visionary DualDisc single (82876725132)
CD side

1. "Rock with You" (single mix) – 3:23
2. "Rock with You" (Masters at Work remix) – 5:33

DVD side

1. "Rock with You" (video) – 3:23

== Personnel ==
- Written and composed by Rod Temperton
- Produced by Quincy Jones
- Recorded and mixed by Bruce Swedien
- Michael Jackson – lead and backing vocals
- Bobby Watson – bass
- John Robinson – drums
- David Williams, Marlo Henderson – electric guitar
- Greg Phillinganes, Michael Boddicker – synthesizers
- David "Hawk" Wolinski – Fender Rhodes
- Horns arranged by Jerry Hey and performed by The Seawind Horns
  - Jerry Hey – trumpet and flugelhorn
  - Larry Williams – tenor, alto saxophones and flute
  - Kim Hutchcroft – baritone, tenor saxophones and flute
  - William Reichenbach – trombone
  - Gary Grant – trumpet
- Rhythm and vocal arrangements by Rod Temperton
- String arrangement by Ben Wright
- Concert master – Gerald Vinci

== Charts ==
=== Weekly charts ===
1979–1980 weekly chart performance for "Rock with You"
Chart (1979–1980)	Peak position
Australia (Kent Music Report)	4
Canada Top Singles (RPM)	3
Finland (Suomen virallinen singlelista)	27
Germany (GfK)	58
Ireland (IRMA)	11
New Zealand (Recorded Music NZ)	3
UK Singles (Official Charts)	7
US Billboard Hot 100	1
US Adult Contemporary (Billboard)	21
US Hot Soul Singles (Billboard)	1
US Cash Box Top 100	1
US Radio & Records CHR/Pop Airplay Chart	2

2006 weekly chart performance for "Rock with You"
Chart (2006)	Peak position
France (SNEP)	59
Ireland (IRMA)	19
Italy (FIMI)	9
Netherlands (Single Top 100)	22
Spain (Promusicae)	1
UK Singles (Official Charts)	15
UK Hip Hop/R&B (Official Charts)	2

2008 weekly chart performance for "Rock with You"
Chart (2008)	Peak position
Spain (Promusicae)	10

2009 weekly chart performance for "Rock with You"
Chart (2009)	Peak position
Australia (ARIA)	36
Canada (Canadian Hot 100)	33
France (SNEP)	90
Germany (GfK)	98
Japan (Japan Hot 100)	59
Netherlands (Single Top 100)	25
Switzerland (Schweizer Hitparade)	68
UK Singles (Official Charts)	54
US Digital Songs (Billboard)	17

2026 weekly chart performance for "Rock with You"
Chart (2026)	Peak position
France (SNEP)	131
Global 200 (Billboard)	60
Sweden Heatseeker (Sverigetopplistan)	15

=== Year-end charts ===
Year-end chart performance for "Rock with You"
Chart (1980)	Position
Australia (Kent Music Report)	39
Canada Top Singles (RPM)	17
New Zealand (Recorded Music NZ)	49
US Billboard Hot 100	4
US Cash Box Top 100	8

== Certifications ==
Certifications for "Rock with You"
Region	Certification	Certified units/sales
Australia (ARIA)	Gold	35,000^{^}
Canada (Music Canada)	2× Platinum	160,000^{‡}
Denmark (IFPI Danmark)	Platinum	90,000^{‡}
Mexico (AMPROFON)	Diamond	300,000^{‡}
New Zealand (RMNZ)	4× Platinum	120,000^{‡}
Spain (Promusicae)	Gold	30,000^{‡}
United Kingdom (BPI)	2× Platinum	1,200,000^{‡}
United States (RIAA)	5× Platinum	5,000,000^{‡}
^{^} Shipments figures based on certification alone.^{‡} Sales+streaming figures based on certification alone.

== Other notable versions ==
In 1998, D'Influence released their version which reached number 30 on the British charts.

== See also ==
- List of Billboard Hot 100 number-one singles of 1980
- List of number-one R&B singles of 1980 (U.S.)
- List of number-one singles of 2006 (Spain)
