= Bad (Michael Jackson song) =

1987 single by Michael Jackson

Single by Michael Jackson

from the album Bad
- B-side: "I Can't Help It"
- Released: September 7, 1987
- Recorded: October 1986
- Genre: Dance-pop; funk
- Length: 4:07 (album version); 8:22 (extended dance mix); 3:57 (Radio Edit)
- Label: Epic
- Songwriter: Michael Jackson
- Producers: Quincy Jones; Michael Jackson (co.)

Michael Jackson singles chronology
"I Just Can't Stop Loving You" (1987)	"Bad" (1987)	"Twenty-Five Miles" (1987)

Music videos
- "Bad" (short version) on YouTube
- "Bad" (long version) on YouTube

"Bad" is a song by the American singer Michael Jackson, released by Epic Records on September 7, 1987, as the second single from his album Bad. It was written and composed by Jackson, and produced by Jackson and Quincy Jones. It was influenced by a true story Jackson read about a young man who tried to escape poverty by attending private school but was killed upon returning home.

"Bad" received positive reviews, with some critics noting that it helped give Jackson an edgier image. It reached number one on the Billboard Hot 100 and the Cash Box Top 100 and remained there for two weeks. It also charted reached number one on the Hot R&B Singles, Hot Dance Club Play and Rhythmic. It reached number one in Ireland, Norway, Spain and the Netherlands, and the top ten in Canada, Australia, New Zealand and several European countries. "Bad" is certified platinum in the US.

The music video premiered in a TV special, Michael Jackson: The Magic Returns, on CBS during prime time on August 31, 1987. It was directed by Martin Scorsese and co-starred Wesley Snipes in one of his first appearances. The video, inspired in part by the film West Side Story, shows Jackson and a group of gangsters portraying a street gang dancing in a subway station, set at the Hoyt–Schermerhorn Streets station. It has been praised by critics as one of the most iconic videos of all time.

== Background and inspiration ==
Michael Jackson wrote and recorded "Bad" in 1986. It was co-produced by Jackson and Quincy Jones, and included on his seventh studio album, Bad, in 1987.

Jackson planned to duet on "Bad" with Prince, but Prince declined the invitation; in a later interview, Prince said: "The first line of that song is 'your butt is mine'. Then I said 'Who's going to sing that to who?' ... because you sure aren't singing that to me, and I sure ain't singing it to you." Prince instead submitted his song "Wouldn't You Love to Love Me", but Jackson rejected it, so it was instead given to Taja Sevelle.

In Jackson's 1988 autobiography Moonwalk, Jackson wrote:

"Bad" is a song about the street. It's about this kid from a bad neighborhood who gets to go away to a private school. He comes back to the old neighborhood when he's on a break from school and the kids from the neighborhood start giving him trouble. He sings, "I'm bad, you're bad, who's bad, who's the best?" He's saying when you're strong and good, then you're bad.

In a 1988 interview with Ebony and Jet magazines, Jackson said he was inspired by a true story that he had read about in either Time or Newsweek. Jackson stated that the story was about a student who went to school in upstate New York, who was "from the ghetto", had tried to make something of his life and planned to leave all of his friends behind when he returned from Thanksgiving break. He added that the student's friends' jealousy resulted in them killing the student; Jackson stated that the student's death was not included in the music video. Various Jackson biographers have concluded that the story he was referring to was that of Edmund Perry. However, Perry was not killed by kids in his neighborhood; he was killed by a plainclothes police officer when Perry and his brother allegedly attacked and badly beat the officer in a mugging attempt.

== Composition ==
The song is written in the key of A minor with a time signature in common time. The pitch is raised almost a quarter of a whole tone from standard pitch, A440 Hz, up to circa A454 Hz. Jackson's vocal range spans from A♭_{3} to B♭ _{5}. The track has a tempo of 114.1 beats per minute. The main bassline is based in the A blues scale.

"Bad" was viewed as a revived "Hit the Road Jack" progression. Davitt Sigerson wrote in Rolling Stone magazine, "When Jackson declares that 'the whole world has to answer right now,' he is not boasting but making a statement of fact regarding his extraordinary stardom. If anything, he is scorning the self-coronation of lesser funk royals and inviting his fickle public to spurn him if it dare." Sigerson compared the track to material by James Brown, whose "It's a Man's Man's Man's World" is openly referenced by the four note brass introduction to the song. Lyrically, "Bad" pertains to proving to people that you are tough by boasting, with Jackson asking "who's bad?"

== Chart performance ==
"Bad" charted within the top ten, at number eight, on the Billboard Hot 100 on October 10, 1987 and peaked at number one on October 24, 1987. "Bad" stayed at the top position for two consecutive weeks. "Bad" was Jackson's Bad album's second number one single on the Billboard Hot 100, and Jackson's eighth number one entry on the chart. The track also charted on the Billboard Hot R&B Singles and Billboard Hot Dance Club Play at number one. "Bad" was commercially successful internationally, generally charting within the top ten, and reaching the top position on some charts. "Bad" debuted at number five on the United Kingdom charts on September 26, 1987. The following week, the song charted at its peak position of number three, where it remained for two weeks. "Bad" remained within the chart's top ten positions for four weeks, and charted within the top 100 for a total of eleven weeks in 1987. "Bad" peaked at number five on Canadian music charts on November 7, 1987. "Bad" peaked at number four in Sweden on October 14, 1987. The song spent four weeks within the chart's top ten. On October 3, "Bad" debuted at number nine in France, and after six weeks of charting within the top ten, the song peaked at number four on November 14. "Bad" debuted on New Zealand music charts at number four on October 18, and the following week moved to its peak position of number two. The song then stayed within the top ten for the next five weeks. The track charted within the top fifty positions for fifteen weeks in 1987 and 1988.

The song also charted at number two in Norway in the thirty-ninth week of 1987, and charted within the top ten positions for eight weeks in 1987. The song was also very successful on the Australian music charts, peaking at number four. "Bad" debuted on Austrian charts at number ten on November 1, 1987. The following week the song charted out of the top ten and the next week returned to the top ten at number nine, which was its peak position. The song debuted at number eighty-seven in Dutch on September 9, 1987. The following week, the song moved up to number eleven, which was seventy-three positions higher than its previous week. The song peaked at number one, and remained at the top position for two consecutive weeks. In 2006, Jackson's music re-entered charts following his music being re-issued for his Visionary album. The track entered Spanish charts for the first time on April 4, 2006, and debuted at the top position. "Bad" remained within the top twenty positions for nine consecutive weeks. The song debuted at its peak position at number five in Italy on April 6. After Jackson's death in June 2009, his music re-entered charts again worldwide. In July, the track peaked at number eleven in Italy, number twenty in Spain, number twenty-five in Sweden, number thirty-seven in Denmark and number forty in the United Kingdom.

== Critical reception ==
"Bad" was well received by contemporary music critics. Some critics noted that the song helped Jackson's image become more edgy. Davitt Sigerson, a writer for Rolling Stone magazine, commented that the track "needs no defense" and he generally praised Jackson's vocal performance in the song. Stephen Thomas Erlewine of AllMusic listed "Bad", along with two other songs from the album, as being top picks from the album's eleven tracks. In separate review of the song, Erlewine commented that Jackson's vocals "sounded like [he was] the love child of James Brown and Mavis Staples" and added that "musically speaking, in this case, 'Bad' is very good". He also noted that the track's "authority and boasting helped to humanize" Jackson and "changed his image", remarking that it was "fun hearing him talking trash and being his own bigger booster". Jennifer Clay of Yahoo Music noted that while Jackson's new edgier image was a "little hard to swallow", the image worked musically on the album's songs "Bad", "Man in the Mirror", and "Dirty Diana".

== Music video ==
Jackson and background dancers in the "Bad" music video. Wearing clothing with a noticeable amount of buckles, Jackson showcased his "street-tough and edgy" image for the first time. The video was heavily influenced by the 1961 film West Side Story.

The full music video for "Bad" is an 18-minute short film written by novelist and screenwriter Richard Price, shot by Michael Chapman, and directed by Martin Scorsese. The video was shot in Brooklyn over a 6-week period during November and December 1986. The video has many references to the 1961 film West Side Story, especially the "Cool" sequence. The video used a different version of the song as opposed to the commercially released version. This version, using a different organ solo in the middle, hasn't been commercially released as of yet.

In the video, Jackson portrays an African American teenager named Darryl, who has just completed a term at an expensive private school. He returns to the city and takes the subway back to his neglected neighborhood. Darryl finds his home empty, but is later greeted by his old gang-friends, led by "Mini Max" (a then mostly unknown Wesley Snipes). At first, relations are friendly but slightly awkward, as the gang starts to realize how much Darryl has changed and how uncomfortable he has become with their criminal activities. Darryl later takes the gang to the subway station (Hoyt–Schermerhorn Streets in Brooklyn) in an attempt to show them that he is still "bad" by attempting to rob an elderly man. He has a change of heart at the last minute and Max chastises him, telling Darryl he is no longer bad. With Darryl provoked, the video then cuts to him and a group of street youths dancing while he sings the song "Bad". Darryl insists that Max is headed for a fall which is nearly Darryl's undoing. Eventually, Max accepts that Darryl is better off without him and leaves him in peace after a final handshake.

The video was not commercially released until it was included in the video albums; Video Greatest Hits – HIStory (long version on DVD and short version in VHS), Number Ones (short version), Michael Jackson's Vision (long version) and the Target version DVD of Bad 25 (short version). The full video was introduced in a TV special, Michael Jackson: The Magic Returns, on Primetime, a CBS television show on August 31, 1987. The full video won awards at various prestigious award ceremonies including Favorite Single (Soul/R&B) at the American Music Awards and Biggest Selling Album by a Male Soloist in the UK from the Guinness Book of World Records. The video has been praised by critics as one of the most iconic and greatest videos of all time; Jackson's outfit has been cited as an influence on fashion.

After Jackson's death in June 2009, Letitia James, a member of the New York City Council, began trying to convince the Metropolitan Transportation Authority to rename or co-name the Hoyt–Schermerhorn Streets station or to hang a plaque at the station in Jackson's honor. However, her request was denied in September 2009. James commented, "Having Michael Jackson visit and moonwalk at this station was a huge deal not only for Brooklyn, but all of New York in the '80s ... And renaming this station in his honor would put it on the map and help ensure that people don't forget." A source from the MTA commented that no subway stations in the MTA system are named or co-named after individuals, mostly because it could confuse riders. The MTA also declined to put a plaque in the station, due to MTA guidelines forbidding such a thing.

== Choreography ==
The video's choreographers Jackson, Jeffrey Daniel, and Gregg Burge were influenced by West Side Story when designing the dance routines but wanted to keep the scene more contemporary and incorporated the "moonwalk" into the movements. Assistant choreographer Jeffrey Daniel commented, "It's like a train coming across the screen ... and that's the effect I was looking for and it worked". The music video received a nomination for choreography at the 1988 MTV Video Music Awards Ceremony. The video for "Bad" and Michael Jackson's "The Way You Make Me Feel" video were both nominated for Best Choreography. However, Janet Jackson's video "The Pleasure Principle" won the award.

== Live performances ==
"Bad" was performed during Jackson's Bad world tour concert series from 1987 to 1989, in both the first and second leg, as the final song in the first leg and sixteenth song in the second leg in the setlist. The song was also included on the first leg only of Jackson's Dangerous World Tour. A live version of the song at Wembley 1988 and Yokohama 1987 are available on the DVD Live at Wembley July 16, 1988.

== Covers and parodies ==
"Weird Al" Yankovic recorded a parody of the song, titled "Fat", for his 1988 album Even Worse. Jackson granted Yankovic permission to film the music video for "Fat" on the same subway set from the "Bad" music video.

In 1989, John Oswald released an expanded version of his original Plunderphonics album containing "Bad", cut up, layered, and rearranged as "Dab". In 1990, notice was given to Oswald by the Canadian Recording Industry Association on behalf of several of their clients that all undistributed copies of Plunderphonics be destroyed under threat of legal action.

The American TV series Glee did a Jackson tribute episode in 2012 titled "Michael", which included an a cappella version of "Bad" featuring the Beelzebubs as part of the Warblers. This cover reached number 80 at Billboard Hot 100, number 48 at Billboard Digital Songs, number 90 at Billboard Canadian Hot 100, and number 29 at Billboard Adult Pop Songs chart at the week of February 18, 2012. In February 2018, Billie Eilish covered the song with her brother Finneas O'Connell for Like a Version.

== Charts ==
=== Weekly charts ===
Weekly chart performance for "Bad"
Chart (1987–1989)	Peak position
Australia (Australian Music Report)	4
Austria (Ö3 Austria Top 40)	9
Belgium (Ultratop 50 Flanders)	1
Canada Retail Singles (The Record)	1
Canada Top Singles (RPM)	5
Canada Adult Contemporary (RPM)	1
Denmark (IFPI)	1
Europe (European Hot 100 Singles)	1
Finland (Suomen virallinen singlelista)	6
France (SNEP)	4
Hungary (MAHASZ)	6
Ireland (IRMA)	1
Italy (Musica e Dischi)	1
Italy Airplay (Music & Media)	6
Netherlands (Dutch Top 40)	1
Netherlands (Single Top 100)	1
New Zealand (Recorded Music NZ)	2
Norway (VG-lista)	2
South Africa (EMA)	4
Spain (AFYVE)	3
Sweden (Sverigetopplistan)	4
Switzerland (Schweizer Hitparade)	3
UK Singles (OCC)	3
US Billboard Hot 100	1
US Adult Contemporary (Billboard)	33
US Dance Club Songs (Billboard) Remix	1
US Dance Singles Sales (Billboard) Remix	1
US Hot Black Singles (Billboard)	1
US Hot Crossover (Billboard)	1
US Cash Box Top 100	1
US CHR/Pop Airplay (Radio & Records)	1
West Germany (GfK)	4

Weekly chart performance for "Bad" upon the release of Visionary
Chart (2006)	Peak position
France (SNEP)	48
Ireland (IRMA)	24
Italy (FIMI)	5
Japan Hot 100 (Billboard)	6
Netherlands (Single Top 100)	27
Spain (Promusicae)	38
UK Singles (OCC)	16

Weekly chart performance for "Bad" upon Jackson's death
Chart (2009)	Peak position
Australia (ARIA)	27
Austria (Ö3 Austria Top 40)	38
Canada (Hot Canadian Digital Singles)	30
Denmark (Tracklisten)	37
France Downloads (SNEP)	12
Italy (FIMI)	11
Netherlands (Single Top 100)	53
Spain (Promusicae)	20
Sweden (Sverigetopplistan)	25
Switzerland (Schweizer Hitparade)	15
UK Singles (OCC)	40
US Hot Digital Songs (Billboard)	23

Weekly chart performance for "Bad" in 2026
Chart (2026)	Peak position
Croatia International Airplay (Top lista)	58
France (SNEP)	56
Global 200 (Billboard)	37
Greece International (IFPI)	38
Italy (FIMI)	77
Panama Streaming (PRODUCE)	108
Peru Streaming (Promúsica)	17
Portugal (AFP)	130
Russia Streaming (TopHit)	98

=== Monthly charts ===
Monthly chart performance
Chart (2026)	Peak position
Panama Streaming (PRODUCE)	131

=== Year-end charts ===
1987 year-end chart performance for "Bad"
Chart (1987)	Position
Australia (Australian Music Report)	22
Belgium (Ultratop)	24
Canada Top Singles (RPM)	54
European Top 100 Singles (Music & Media)	22
Netherlands (Dutch Top 40)	37
Netherlands (Single Top 100)	14
UK Singles (OCC)	57
US Billboard Hot 100	59
US Hot Black Singles (Billboard)	46
US Hot Crossover Singles (Billboard)	12
US Cash Box Top 100	24
West Germany (Media Control)	75

1988 year-end chart performance for "Bad"
Chart (1988)	Position
US 12-inch Singles Sales (Billboard)	50

== Certifications and sales ==
Certifications and sales for "Bad"
Region	Certification	Certified units/sales
Australia (ARIA)	Platinum	70,000^{^}
Canada (Music Canada)	2× Platinum	160,000^{‡}
Denmark (IFPI Danmark)	Gold	45,000^{‡}
France (SNEP)	Silver	250,000^{*}
Germany (BVMI)	Gold	300,000^{‡}
Italy (FIMI) Sales since 2009	Gold	100,000^{‡}
Japan (RIAJ) Full-length ringtone	Gold	100,000^{*}
Mexico (AMPROFON)	Diamond+Gold	330,000^{‡}
New Zealand (RMNZ)	Platinum	30,000^{‡}
Spain (Promusicae)	Gold	50,000^{‡}
United Kingdom (BPI)	Platinum	600,000^{‡}
United States (RIAA)	Platinum	1,000,000^{‡}
^{*} Sales figures based on certification alone.^{^} Shipments figures based on certification alone.^{‡} Sales+streaming figures based on certification alone.

== Track listings and formats ==
- United Kingdom 7" single
1. "Bad" (7" single mix) – 4:06
2. "Bad" (dance remix radio edit) – 4:54
- United Kingdom 12" single
1. "Bad" – 4:06
2. "Bad" (dance extended mix includes "false fade") – 8:24
3. "Bad" (dub version) – 4:05
4. "Bad" (a cappella) – 3:49
- United States / Europe 7" single
1. "Bad" – 4:06
2. "I Can't Help It" – 4:28
- United States CD single
1. "Bad" (dance extended mix; includes "false fade") – 8:24
2. "Bad" (7" single mix) – 4:06
3. "Bad" (dance remix radio edit) – 4:54
4. "Bad" (dub version) – 4:05
5. "Bad" (a cappella) – 3:49

Visionary single

- CD side
1. "Bad" (7" single mix) – 4:06
2. "Bad" ("false fade" dance extended mix) – 8:22
- DVD side
1. "Bad" (music video (short version)) – 4:20
2. "Bad" (music video) – 18:06

== Official versions ==
- Album version – 4:06
- 7" single mix (new album version, without brass on first part) – 4:06
- Dance extended mix includes "false fade" – 8:23
- Dance remix radio edit – 4:56
- Dub version – 4:06
- A cappella – 3:49
- Afrojack club mix – 7:36
- Afrojack remix featuring Pitbull DJ Buddha Edit – 4:31
- "Remember the Time"/"Bad" (Immortal version) – 4:39

== Personnel ==
Musicians

- Michael Jackson – lead and background vocals
- David Williams – guitar
- Jimmy Smith – MIDI organ
- Greg Phillinganes – synthesizers
- Michael Boddicker – synthesizers
- John Barnes – synthesizers
- Christopher Currell – synthesizers, digital guitar, rubboard
- John Robinson – drums
- Paulinho Da Costa – percussion
- Larry Williams – saxophone
- Kim Hutchcroft – saxophone
- Jerry Hey – trumpet
- Gary Grant – trumpet

Production

- Michael Jackson – co-producer, composer, vocal arrangements, rhythm arrangements
- Quincy Jones – co-producer, rhythm arrangements
- Bruce Swedien – recording/tracking, mixing
- Christopher Currell – rhythm arrangements
- Douglas Getschal – drum programming
- Jerry Hey – horn arrangements

== 2012 remix ==
"Bad (Afrojack Remix) [DJ Buddha Edit]"

Single by Michael Jackson featuring Pitbull

from the album Bad 25
- Released: August 14, 2012
- Recorded: 1986 (original); 2012 (additional overdubs and mixes)
- Genre: Dance-pop; house
- Length: 4:29
- Label: Epic
- Songwriters: Michael Jackson; Armando Pérez
- Producers: Quincy Jones; Michael Jackson (co-producer)

Michael Jackson singles chronology
"I Just Can't Stop Loving You" (2012)	"Bad (Afrojack Remix) [DJ Buddha Edit]" (2012)	"I'm So Blue" (2012)

Pitbull singles chronology
"Feel Alive" (2012)	"Bad (Afrojack Remix) [DJ Buddha Edit]" (2012)	"Don't Stop the Party" (2012)

Licensed audio
- "Bad (Afrojack Remix) [DJ Buddha Edit]" on YouTube

A remix of "Bad" featuring Afrojack, DJ Buddha and Pitbull was produced for the 2012 Bad 25 album reissue. It was made available as a digital single prior to the album's release, via iTunes and Amazon.com on August 14, 2012.

=== Track listing ===
- Digital single
1. "Bad" (Afrojack Remix) feat. Pitbull [DJ Buddha Edit] – 4:29
- HMV exclusive CD single (HMV Bad 25 pre-order only bonus CD)
1. "Bad" (Afrojack Remix) feat. Pitbull [The Derry Mix] – 3:54

=== Chart performance ===
Re-titled as "Bad 2012", the single appeared on several countries' music charts, including debuting at number 52 on the Billboard Japan Hot 100 chart, in the week of September 15, 2012, and peaking at number 6 several weeks later. It also appeared on the US Billboard Dance/Electronic Digital Songs Chart at number 45 for one week on September 1, 2012. On the week of September 29, 2012, it debuted on the Hot Dance Club Songs chart at number 42, and peaked at number 18.

=== Critical reception ===
This remix received overwhelmingly negative reviews from music critics. Randall Roberts of the Los Angeles Times wrote that the remixes on Bad 25 were "terrible... and are an insult to MJ's memory not because they rework his music, but because they do it so ungracefully." Evan Sawdey from PopMatters said "Afrojack has two remixes of 'Bad' here, obviously trying to make the song sound like it belongs on modern-day radio (one of them, with two guest verses from Pitbull, is just outright trash)." MisterCharlie from SupaJam.com also gave it an extremely negative review. The Guardian's review said it was "a clubbed-up remix featuring the world's worst rapper."

=== Charts ===
Chart (2012–2018)	Peak position
Japan Hot 100 (Billboard)	6
Poland Airplay (ZPAV)	89
US Hot Dance Club Play (Billboard)	18

2026 weekly chart performance
Chart (2026)	Peak position
Russia Streaming (TopHit)	99

== Bibliography ==
- Grant, Adrian (2009). Michael Jackson: The Visual Documentary. Omnibus Press. ISBN 978-1-84938-261-8.
- Halstead, Craig (2003). Michael Jackson The Solo Years. On-Line Ltd. ISBN 978-0-7552-0091-7.
- Jackson, Michael (1988). Moonwalk. Doubleday. ISBN 0-434-37042-8.
- Taraborrelli, J. Randy (2004). The Magic and the Madness. Terra Alta, WV: Headline. ISBN 0-330-42005-4.
