= Don't Stop 'Til You Get Enough =

1979 single by Michael Jackson

- 2000s reissue variant of 1979 European picture sleeve

Single by Michael Jackson

from the album Off the Wall
- B-side: "I Can't Help It"
- Released: July 10, 1979
- Recorded: December 1978
- Studio: Allen Zentz, Westlake and Cherokee, Los Angeles
- Genre: Disco; funk; pop
- Length: 6:04 (album version); 5:45 (US single version); 4:13 (short version with intro); 3:58 (short version without intro)
- Label: Epic
- Songwriter: Michael Jackson
- Producers: Quincy Jones; Michael Jackson

Michael Jackson singles chronology
"A Brand New Day" (1979)	"Don't Stop 'Til You Get Enough" (1979)	"Rock with You" (1979)

Alternative release(s)
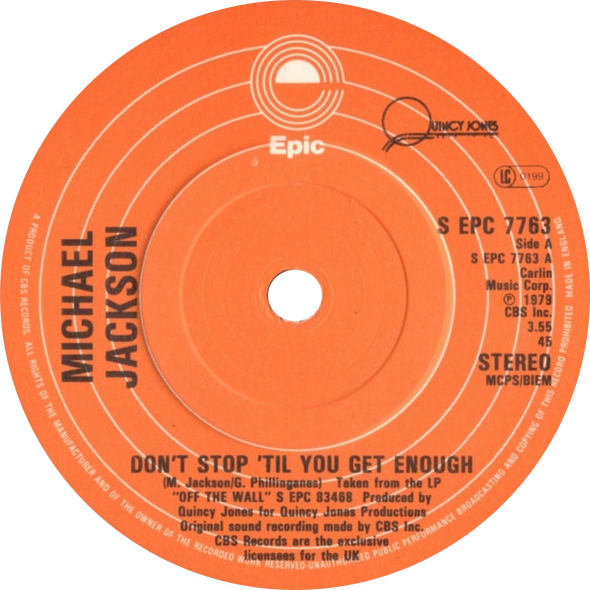
- Solid center variant of the UK 7-inch single

Music video
- "Don't Stop 'Til You Get Enough" on YouTube

"Don't Stop 'Til You Get Enough" is a song by the American singer-songwriter Michael Jackson. Written by Jackson, and released by Epic Records on July 10, 1979, the song is the first track on Jackson's fifth studio album, Off the Wall (1979). Additionally, it was Jackson's first solo recording in which he had control of the creative direction.

"Don't Stop 'Til You Get Enough" was Jackson's second solo single to hit number one on the US Billboard Hot 100 chart following "Ben" and his first solo number-one hit on the Billboard Soul Singles chart. It remained at number one for six weeks on Billboard Soul Singles chart. It is certified 5× Platinum by the Recording Industry Association of America (RIAA). The song also achieved worldwide success, reaching number one in nine other countries. "Don't Stop 'Til You Get Enough" was well received by contemporary music critics and is widely regarded as one of the greatest and most iconic disco songs of all time.

An accompanying music video for "Don't Stop 'Til You Get Enough" was directed by Nick Saxton and released in October 1979. The video shows Jackson dancing, as well as being shown in an innovative triplicate, in different color backgrounds. The song also won Jackson his first Grammy Award and American Music Awards.

== Background and production ==
In 1978, Jackson starred as the Scarecrow in The Wiz, an urbanized retelling of L. Frank Baum's The Wonderful Wizard of Oz. After the filming, Jackson, who was still a member of The Jacksons, approached the film's musical director, Quincy Jones, to ask if he knew of any producers to help with Jackson's future solo endeavors. Jones suggested himself, and the two began work on Off the Wall. After listening to hundreds of demos, the two decided upon the ones to record. These included "Workin' Day and Night", "Get on the Floor" and "Don't Stop 'Til You Get Enough". The song was recorded in Los Angeles. Jackson claimed that when the melody of "Don't Stop 'Til You Get Enough" came to him, he could not shake it off. He found himself humming and singing it while walking through the Jacksons' Encino home. As Michael was not a keyboardist, although certainly capable of playing piano, he had his brother Randy perform the melody on a piano in the family's recording studio. When Jackson's mother, Katherine Jackson, a devout Jehovah's Witness, heard the song, she was shocked by the lyrical content and felt that the title could be misconstrued as pertaining to sexual activity. Jackson reassured her that the song was not a reference to sex, but could mean whatever people wanted it to. Upon playing the recording to Jones, it was agreed that the song would be featured on Off the Wall.

In a speech at the 2016 Red Bull Music Academy, Greg Phillinganes alleged that Jackson played him an early demo of "Don't Stop 'Til You Get Enough" and said "it needs another part", after which Phillinganes suggested the bridge, and the two agreed to rate his contribution at 10% of the song. Soon thereafter, however, he was informed that his contribution would be considered merely an arrangement. Nevertheless, many pressings of the single list both Jackson and Phillinganes as composers. Quincy Jones has backed Phillinganes' allegation.

== Composition ==
"Don't Stop 'Til You Get Enough" is the first solo song written by Michael Jackson, although "Blues Away" had been released in 1976.

Musically, it is credited as a disco, funk and pop song. The song's full length on Off the Wall is just over six minutes. The song introduced Jackson's falsetto voice and vocal hiccups, which would become one of Jackson's signature techniques. Along with Jackson's vocal hiccups, Jackson's voice in the song was described as having vocal tics—from the hiccups, a "grunt", and "the 'oho!'". "Don't Stop 'Til You Get Enough" is in common time signature in the key of B Mixolydian and the vocal range is from G♯_{3} to B_{5}. Instruments used are a six-piece horn section (two trumpets, alto sax, tenor sax, trombone, and baritone sax), string section (arranged by Ben Wright), and two guitars, keyboards, bass, drums and percussion. The song's tempo is upbeat at 119 beats per minute. The song begins with a spoken word section by Jackson before he bursts into singing.

Musician Sheila E. has gone on record to say that she was part of the recording process, playing percussion and adding the "water bottle" sound heard at the beginning of the track.

== Release and reception ==
Professional ratings
Review scores
Source	Rating
AllMusic	2.5/5 stars

"Don’t Stop 'Til You Get Enough" was released in the US on July 10, 1979, under Epic Records; Jackson's first solo single away from Motown Records. It was well received by contemporary critics. Stephen Holden, of Rolling Stone, described the song as "one of a handful of recent disco releases that works both as a dance track and as an aural extravaganza comparable to Earth, Wind and Fire's 'Boogie Wonderland'". Cash Box described it as having "a zesty, infectious disco rhythm", a "funky hook line", "buzzing electronic keyboard work and bright horns." The song topped the US Billboard Hot 100 on October 13, and within three months of its release, it had been certified gold. It was Jackson's first solo number one single since "Ben", seven years prior. It remained atop of the Billboard Hot 100 for one week. It also reached the top of the charts in Australia, New Zealand, Norway and South Africa, and peaked at number three in the United Kingdom. "Don't Stop 'Til You Get Enough" was awarded platinum certification by the Recording Industry Association of America in 1989.

In 2006, "Don't Stop 'Til You Get Enough" reached number 17 in the United Kingdom, following the Visionary campaign, whereby 20 of Jackson's hit singles were reissued in several European countries. Following Jackson's death in June 2009, his music saw an increase in popularity. "Don't Stop 'Til You Get Enough" peaked at number seven on Billboard's Hot Digital Songs Chart, peaking at number nine on the charts issue date July 11, 2009. "Don't Stop 'Til You Get Enough" charted within the top ten, placing at number nine, in France, and charted within the top 20 in Italy, Portugal and Switzerland, placing at number 16, 18 and 20. The song also charted at number 21 in Australia, 38 in the United Kingdom, and 50 in Sweden, respectively. "Don't Stop 'Til You Get Enough"s least successful country was Japan, peaking at number 77. "Don’t Stop 'Til You Get Enough" was certified platinum in Australia by CBS records Australia in 1980 (Epic's distributor in Australia) for the shipments of more than 100,000 units.

"Don't Stop 'Til You Get Enough" earned Jackson his first solo Grammy Award, winning Best Male R&B Vocal Performance at the 1980 Grammy Awards. It was also nominated for Best Disco Recording. The song also received Favorite Soul/R&B Single at the 1980 American Music Awards.

== Music video ==
Jackson in the music video for "Don't Stop 'Til You Get Enough"

The accompanying music video for "Don't Stop 'Til You Get Enough" was directed and produced by Nick Saxton and made its world premiere in October 1979. It was Jackson's first music video as a solo artist. The music video shows a smiling Jackson in a black and white tuxedo with a black bow tie (resembling the Off the Wall album cover photo) dancing and singing the song while appearing chroma keyed over a background of abstract geometric figures. At one stage, Jackson is seen dancing in triplicate, which was considered innovative at the time.

The music video was included on the video albums: Video Greatest Hits – HIStory, Number Ones and Michael Jackson's Vision.

== Live performances ==
Michael Jackson performed this song on The Jacksons' Destiny Tour on the second leg, as well as the Triumph Tour. An arrangement of the song was performed on Jackson's Bad World Tour as part of the "Bad Groove" interlude. It was also performed on Jackson's 96–97 HIStory World Tour as part of the "Off the Wall Medley" along with "Rock with You" and "Off the Wall". Jackson would have also performed it on the This Is It concert series as part of the "Off the Wall Medley", but the shows were canceled due to his sudden death.

== Legacy ==
James Montgomery of MTV noted that "Don't Stop 'Til You Get Enough", along with Off the Wall's other three singles, "showcased (or, more specifically, unleashed) Jackson's talents as a [sic] entertainer, a vocalist, a writer and, most importantly, as a leading man." After Jackson's death, AOL's Radio Blog released a list, entitled "10 Best Michael Jackson Songs", which placed "Don't Stop 'Til You Get Enough" at number ten on the list. Rolling Stone and American Songwriter both ranked the song number three on their lists of the greatest Michael Jackson songs. In 2022, Rolling Stone ranked it number 57 in their list of the "200 Greatest Dance Songs of All Time".

William Ruhlmann, author of The All-Music Guide to Rock, praised "Don't Stop 'Til You Get Enough" as an "irresistible dance track". John Lewis, author of 1001 Albums You Must Hear Before You Die, noted that the "jittery, frenetic opening track" is the centerpiece of Off the Wall. He concluded that "Jackson's falsetto hollers and frisky yelps serve as an obbligato to the lead line, punctuating Ben Wright's thrilling string arrangement and Jerry Hey's tight horn charts". Jason Elias, a writer for Allmusic, noted that "Don't Stop 'Til You Get Enough" presents a "new Michael Jackson" that was "sexual, adult, and aggressive. Elias commented that "Like the best of Jones' late-'70s, early-'80s work, this [song] wasn't quite disco, couldn't be hardcore funk – it was an amalgam of styles with the all-important pop accessibility."

Jackson's biographer J. Randy Taraborrelli described Jackson's vocal styling as a "sexy, playful falsetto" that "no one had ever heard from him before". Nelson George stated that the argument for Jackson's greatness began with the arrangements of "Don't Stop 'Til You Get Enough". He noted that the percussion and backing vocals were "artfully choreographed" to "create drama and ecstasy on the dance floor". He concluded, "It's one thing to make a dance record — it is another to instill that track with an epic, celebratory quality as Michael does here". James Montgomery of MTV noted that Off The Wall contained a "masterful mixture of fiery disco tracks", specifying "Don't Stop 'Til You Get Enough" and "Workin' Day and Night".

== Personnel ==
- Written and composed by Michael Jackson
- Produced by Quincy Jones
- Co-produced by Michael Jackson
- Michael Jackson: lead vocals and backing vocals, hand claps
- Additional backing vocals and party sound effects by Jim Gilstrap, Augie Johnson, Mortonette Jenkins, Paulette McWilliams and Zedric Wiliams
- Greg Phillinganes: piano, Rhodes, Clavinet, synthesizers
- David Williams, Marlo Henderson: guitars
- Louis Johnson: bass
- John Robinson: drums
- Sheila E.: glass bottles
- Paulinho da Costa: cabasa
- Richard Heath: cowbell
- Horns arranged by Jerry Hey and performed by The Seawind Horns:
  - Larry Williams: tenor and alto saxophones, flute
  - Kim Hutchcroft: baritone and tenor saxophones, flute
  - Jerry Hey: trumpet, flugelhorn
  - Gary Grant: trumpet
  - William Reichenbach: trombone
- Rhythm arrangement by Greg Phillinganes and Michael Jackson
- Vocal and percussion arrangements by Michael Jackson
- String arrangement by Ben Wright
- Concert master: Gerald Vinci
- Recording engineer and mixing: Bruce Swedien
- Mastering engineer: Bernie Grundman

== Charts ==
=== Weekly charts ===
1979 weekly chart performance for "Don't Stop 'Til You Get Enough"
Chart (1979)	Peak position
Australia (Kent Music Report)	1
Austria (Ö3 Austria Top 40)	11
Belgium (Ultratop 50 Flanders)	2
Canada Top Singles (RPM)	3
Canada Top Disco Singles (RPM)	1
Denmark (Tracklisten)	1
Finland (Suomen virallinen singlelista)	5
Finland Jukebox (Suomen virallinen singlelista)	8
France (SNEP)	12
Ireland (IRMA)	10
Italy (Musica e Dischi)	15
Netherlands (Dutch Top 40)	2
Netherlands (Single Top 100)	2
New Zealand (Recorded Music NZ)	1
Norway (VG-lista)	1
South Africa (Springbok Radio)	1
Spain (AFE)	5
Sweden (Sverigetopplistan)	18
Switzerland (Schweizer Hitparade)	4
UK Singles (Official Charts)	3
US Billboard Hot 100	1
US Hot Soul Singles (Billboard)	1
US Disco Top 100 (Billboard)	2
US Cash Box Top 100	1
US Radio & Records CHR/Pop Airplay Chart	5
West Germany (GfK)	13

2006 weekly chart performance for "Don't Stop 'Til You Get Enough"
Chart (2006)	Peak position
France (SNEP)	52
Germany (GfK)	77
Ireland (IRMA)	21
Italy (FIMI)	6
Netherlands (Single Top 100)	39
Spain (Promusicae)	2
UK Singles (Official Charts)	17

2008 weekly chart performance for "Don't Stop 'Til You Get Enough"
Chart (2008)	Peak position
France (SNEP)	54
Spain (Promusicae)	7

2009 weekly chart performance for "Don't Stop 'Til You Get Enough"
Chart (2009)	Peak position
Australia (ARIA)	21
Austria (Ö3 Austria Top 40)	47
Canada Digital Songs (Billboard)	19
France (Billboard) France Songs	9
Germany (GfK)	69
Ireland (IRMA)	36
Italy (FIMI)	16
Japan (Japan Hot 100)	77
Netherlands (Single Top 100)	10
Portugal (Top 20)	18
Sweden (Sverigetopplistan)	50
Switzerland (Schweizer Hitparade)	20
UK Singles (Official Charts)	38
US Hot Digital Songs (Billboard)	9

2026 weekly chart performance for "Don't Stop 'Til You Get Enough"
Chart (2026)	Peak position
Argentina Hot 100 (Billboard)	94
Austria (Ö3 Austria Top 40)	44
Bolivia (Billboard)	19
Brazil Hot 100 (Billboard)	77
Canada Hot 100 (Billboard)	49
Chile (Billboard)	19
Colombia Hot 100 (Billboard)	94
Ecuador (Billboard)	21
France (SNEP)	38
Germany (GfK)	47
Global 200 (Billboard)	11
Greece International (IFPI)	18
Iceland (Billboard)	14
Italy (FIMI)	38
Luxembourg (Billboard)	17
Middle East and North Africa (IFPI)	13
New Zealand (Recorded Music NZ)	15
Netherlands (Single Top 100)	33
Panama Streaming (PRODUCE)	59
Peru (Billboard)	6
Peru Streaming (Promúsica)	8
Portugal (AFP)	47
Spain (Promusicae)	53
Sweden (Sverigetopplistan)	52
Switzerland (Schweizer Hitparade)	14
United Arab Emirates (IFPI)	7
UK Singles (Official Charts)	15

=== Monthly charts ===
2026 monthly chart performance for "Don't Stop 'Til You Get Enough"
Chart (1979)	Position
Panama Streaming (PRODUCE)	66

=== Year-end charts ===
1979 year-end chart performance for "Don't Stop 'Til You Get Enough"
Chart (1979)	Position
Australia (Kent Music Report)	50
Belgium (Ultratop 50 Flanders)	27
Canada Top Singles (RPM)	32
Netherlands (Dutch Top 40)	31
Netherlands (Single Top 100)	50
New Zealand (Recorded Music NZ)	13
UK Singles (Music Week)	23
US Billboard Hot 100	91
US Hot Soul Singles (Billboard)	3
US Cash Box Top 100	17

1980 year-end chart performance for "Don't Stop 'Til You Get Enough"
Chart (1980)	Position
Australia (Kent Music Report)	12
South Africa (Springbok Radio)	4

== Certifications ==
Certifications for "Don't Stop 'Til You Get Enough"
Region	Certification	Certified units/sales
Australia (ARIA)	Platinum	70,000^{^}
Canada (Music Canada)	3× Platinum	240,000^{‡}
Denmark (IFPI Danmark)	Platinum	90,000^{‡}
Germany (BVMI)	Gold	300,000^{‡}
Italy (FIMI) sales since 2009	Gold	35,000^{‡}
New Zealand (RMNZ)	3× Platinum	90,000^{‡}
Spain (Promusicae) Visionary version	Platinum	100,000^{‡}
United Kingdom (BPI) physical	Silver	250,000^{^}
United Kingdom (BPI)	2× Platinum	1,200,000^{‡}
United States (RIAA)	Platinum	1,000,000^{^}
United States (RIAA) Digital	5× Platinum	5,000,000^{‡}
Streaming
Greece (IFPI Greece)	Gold	1,000,000^{†}
^{^} Shipments figures based on certification alone.^{‡} Sales+streaming figures based on certification alone.^{†} Streaming-only figures based on certification alone.

== Bibliography ==
- George, Nelson (2004). Michael Jackson: The Ultimate Collection booklet. Sony BMG.
- Halstead, Craig (2007). Michael Jackson: For the Record. Authors OnLine. ISBN 978-0-7552-0267-6.
- Taraborrelli, J. Randy (2004). The Magic and the Madness. Terra Alta, WV: Headline. ISBN 0-330-42005-4.
