= Dancing the Dream =

Book by Michael Jackson

- Author: Michael Jackson
- Language: English
- Subject: Poems,reflections
- Genre: Poetry
- Publisher: Doubleday
- Publication date: June 18, 1992
- Publication place: United States
- Pages: 148 to 160 (in some versions)
- ISBN: 978-0-385-42277-2
- OCLC: 25248203
- Dewey Decimal: 818/.5409 20
- LC Class: ML420.J175 A3 1992
- Preceded by: Moonwalk

Dancing the Dream is a 1992 book of poems and reflections written by American singer and recording artist Michael Jackson, his second book following his 1988 autobiography Moonwalk. The book also contains an assortment of around 100 photographs of Jackson.

Dancing the Dream was published by Doubleday on June 18, 1992, seven months after the release of Jackson's 1991 Dangerous album. It was not a significant commercial success. The book was reissued by the British publisher Transworld on July 27, 2009, following Jackson's death on June 25.

== Content ==
Jackson dedicated Dancing the Dream to his mother Katherine, and the book has an introduction written by his longtime friend Elizabeth Taylor.

The volume consists of 46 pieces of poetry and essays. The subjects Jackson writes about are primarily children, animals and the environment. For example, one specific poem titled "Look Again, Baby Seal" promotes environmentalism as Jackson imagines anthropomorphic seals who brood about the fate of being killed by hunters. Another poem ("So the Elephants March") presents elephants that refuse to be killed in order for ivory pieces to be made from their tusks. A third piece ("Mother Earth") describes a struggle to cope with the discovery of an oil-covered seagull feather. To stress the theme of environmentalism and the necessity for action, Jackson writes in the essay, "We've been treating Mother Earth the way some people treat a rental apartment. Just trash it and move on."

Jackson also writes about the degree to which the 1990 death of the AIDS sufferer Ryan White affected him in a poem titled after the youth, and as he presents in the poem, Jackson believes the teenage boy suffered through general ignorance of the disease. The poem "Mother" was written for his mother Katherine, whom Jackson loved deeply. In one stanza Jackson writes, "No matter where I go from here/You're in my heart, mother dear." The poem had previously been published by his mother in her 1990 autobiography My Family, and was not the only material in Dancing the Dream to have appeared elsewhere. The poems "Dancing the Dream" (titled as "The Dance") and "Planet Earth" were included in the sleeve notes for Jackson's 1991 Dangerous album (and in its 2001 special edition re-release). The lyrics to the songs "Will You Be There" and "Heal the World" — also from the 1991 album — were included in Dancing the Dream. A spoken version of the poem "Planet Earth" appeared on the 2009 posthumous album This Is It.

Dancing the Dream includes approximately 100 photographs. Some photographs had been previously published, such as those that were published in the 1985 Jackson calendar, and others that had been published in magazines such as Ebony and People. Furthermore, the volume includes photographs converted from stills of Jackson's music videos such as "Black or White" (1991) and "Remember the Time" (1992). Jackson commissioned artwork for Dancing the Dream from Nate Giorgio and David Nordahl, whom Jackson met in the 1980s and with whom he subsequently developed a professional relationship.

== Poems and essays ==
Dancing the Dream	Planet Earth	Magical Child Part 1	Wings Without Me
Dance of Life	When Babies Smile	But the Heart Said No	Children of the World
So the Elephants March	The Boy and the Pillow	Enough for Today	Mark of the Ancients
Heal the World	Children	Mother	Magic
The Fish That Was Thirsty	Innocence	Trust	Courage
Love	God	How I Make Music	Ryan White
The Elusive Shadow	On Children of the World	Two Birds	The Last Tear
Ecstasy	Berlin 1989	Mother Earth	Wise Little Girl
I You We	Angel of Light	I Searched for My Star	A Child Is a Song
Child of Innocence	Will You Be There	Magical Child Part 2	Are You Listening?
Breaking Free	Once We Were There	Heaven Is Here	Quantum Leap
That One in the Mirror	Look Again, Baby Seal		

== Publication history ==
Dancing the Dream was first published on June 18, 1992, by Doubleday. It followed Jackson's 1988 autobiography Moonwalk, which was also published by the American company. Prior to publication, Dancing the Dream was hailed by the publishers as a book that would "take us deep into [Jackson's] heart and soul", as well as "an inspirational and passionate volume of unparalleled humanity". In his only interview to promote Dancing the Dream, Jackson described the book as being "just a verbal expression of what I usually express through my music and my dance." After his death on June 25, 2009, the British company Transworld reissued the book the following month on July 27, 2009.

A representative for Doubleday (Marly Rusoff) revealed in March 1993 that the company shipped 133,000 copies of the book, and took around 80,000 returns and 3000 reorders. Thus, the project was close to 60% down in total sales. Rusoff stated that the commercial performance of Dancing the Dream was low because an anticipated Jackson tour of the United States never occurred. He commented, "The reviews—and there were some—were rather discouraging. He did do a Europe tour and the British edition did quite well. This kind of book depends on celebrity visibility."

Suzanne Mantell of Publishers Weekly felt that Dancing the Dream did not create the "important buzz that gives a book a life and saves it from cultural oblivion ... Jackson may draw an audience of 65 million when he appears on Oprah, but the consensus among booksellers is that bookbuyers don't care, and that this one was a dog."

During a Simulchat in 1995, Jackson stated, "I wrote a book called Dancing the Dream. It was more autobiographical than Moonwalk, which I did with Mrs. Onassis. It wasn't full of gossip and scandal and all that trash that people write, so I don't think people paid much attention to it, but it came from my heart. It was essays, thoughts and things that I've thought about while on tour."

== Working references ==
- "Doubleday To Reissue Michael Jackson's Own Book, Dancing The Dream". Booktrade.info. July 6, 2009. Archived from the original on 3 March 2016.
- Coleman, Mark (September 4, 2009). "Michael Jackson finally laid to rest in Los Angeles". Telegraph.com. Telegraph Media Group.
- Pauli, Michele (July 7, 2009). "First 'instant' Jackson biography hits shelves in China". The Guardian.
- Brown, Mick (June 27, 2009). "Michael Jackson, death by showbusiness:In 1992, Michael Jackson published a slim volume of "poems and reflections" entitled Dancing The Dream". Daily Telegraph.
- Chopra, Deepak (June 28, 2009). "Jackson was pure, childlike: Deepak Chopra". Times of India.
