= Mister Lucky's Lounge =

Night club

Mister Lucky's Lounge (or Mr Lucky's Lounge) was a night club and music venue established in the 1960s, located at 1100 Grant St in Gary, Indiana.

== History ==
Recognized by the Rock and Roll Hall of Fame, Mister Lucky's Lounge is the venue where The Jackson Five first performed publicly in 1964. In his 1988 biography Moonwalk, Michael Jackson speaks at length about his first experience performing at Lucky's publicly in Gary, where the band had its first regular performances between five and seven nights per week.

In the 2009 A&E series, The Jack5ons: A Family Dynasty, the remaining Jackson Five members returned to Gary Ind., including a stop at Mister Lucky's Lounge.

In 2011, a newly formed Mister Lucky's Lounge, LLC announced plans to create a greenspace and a monument at the former Mister Lucky's Lounge site, 1100 Grant St, Gary, IN 46404.
