= Yamuna Sangarasivam =

Sri Lankan Tamil - American dancer, writer, university professor and academic

Yamuna Sangarasivam is a Sri Lankan Eelam American dancer, academic and writer. She became well known for dancing with Michael Jackson in the music video for his song "Black or White" (1991). She works as a professor of Sociology and Anthropology at Nazareth University. She is also currently director of the Women and Gender Studies Program at Nazareth College.

== Biography ==
Yamuna was born and raised in the Northern Province of Sri Lanka. Her father was of Singaporean-Ceylonese origin while her mother was from Kuala Lumpur, Malaysia.

She pursued an interest in dancing from the age of six. She initially learned the classical dance Bharatanatyam. She learned the classical dance Odissi under the guidance of Gangadhar Pradhan, while she was staying in Odisha for her studies. She also studied western classical piano and Tamil carnatic voice.

She emigrated with her family and settled in the United States when she was nine years old. Prior to moving to the US permanently, she lived in Sri Lanka and North Borneo for some time.

== Career ==
Sangarasivam completed her Bachelor of Arts in Musicology and Piano in 1990 at the University of Minnesota. She pursued her master's degree in Anthropology and Ethnochoreology at the University of California, Los Angeles in 1992. She obtained her Doctor of Philosophy in Anthropology at the Syracuse University in 2000.

She rose to prominence and limelight following her dance performance with the iconic Michael Jackson in his 1991 song "Black or White". The song eventually premiered in over 27 countries, reaching a wider audience range of 500 million. She received the opportunity after being selected as one of the dancers amongst 3,000 participants at an audition conducted by Jackson himself, calling for ethnic and modern dancers for "Black or White". Yamuna's duet with Jackson was shot at a location that brought the Los Angeles expressway to a standstill temporarily, barring private vehicles from entering the expressway in order to pave the way to film both Jackson and Yamuna with stunt drivers. The shooting took place for nearly 14 hours.

She has engaged in teaching and research on various fields including nationalism, terrorism, social conflict, cultural anthropology, women and gender studies, intersectionalities of race, class, gender, and sexuality. She published a bibliography titled Nationalism, Terrorism, Patriotism: A Speculative Ethnography of War (2021) which was based on the tactics of suicide bombings deployed by the militants representing the Liberation Tigers of Tamil Eelam during its fight against the Government of Sri Lanka in the 26-year Sri Lankan Civil War.
