= Blane David Nordahl =

American cat burglar for Sterling silver (born 1962)

Blane David Nordahl (born April 19, 1962) is an American cat burglar, who was given the nickname "Burglar to the Stars" after his exploits at the homes of individuals such as Ivana Trump, Steven Spielberg, Curt Gowdy and Bruce Springsteen. A highly skilled burglar, at five feet-four inches and 150 pounds, Nordahl targeted the homes of wealthy individuals across the East Coast and showed an exclusive interest in stealing hallmarked antique sterling silver. Estimates of his crimes are hampered by lack of details for crimes he is only suspected of, and the early burglaries that have not been fully documented; a November 2000 U.S. News & World Report article attributed to him a value of burglaries of up to $3 million, a 2004 profile in The New Yorker quoted an estimate that he had stolen over $10 million worth of silver, and a New Jersey police detective featured in a 2015 episode of American Greed suggests that the decades-long crime spree is valued at upwards of $50 million. Despite his skill, by 2004 he had already been arrested at least eight times and had spent many years in prison, continuing with arrests and imprisonment thereafter, such as a sentence in Georgia in 2017, and a sentence in South Carolina in 2025.

== Biography ==
=== Early life ===
Nordahl was born April 19, 1962, the son of artist David Nordahl and his wife Sharon, and grew up in Albert Lea, Minnesota. He attended high school in Wisconsin, but dropped out and started work in the construction industry. The family later moved to Santa Fe, New Mexico, where he completed his GED before joining the United States Navy, where he served for several years.

=== Criminal beginnings ===
Nordahl began his criminal career while posted at a naval weapons station in Monmouth County, New Jersey, in 1983. He was soon arrested and served a short jail sentence. In these early years, he also spent time in prison for burglaries in Burlington County; on both occasions he was released early on parole for good behavior. In 1991, he was again arrested and charged with prowling and possessing instruments connected to burglaries, although there was not enough evidence to charge him with the break-ins themselves. For this charge, he spent a few months in Montgomery County, Pennsylvania, prison. Soon after his release, Nordahl was back in prison again, having confessed to 40 burglaries.

=== 'Burglar to the Stars' ===
When released, Nordahl continued his criminal activities and in 1996 Connecticut police issued an arrest warrant, accusing him of burglaries to the value of $750,000. This included the theft of 120 pairs of sterling silver salt and pepper shakers from the home of Ivana Trump in Greenwich, which were valued at approximately $50,000. A report on this burglary alerted the North Shore police to the fact that Nordahl might also be responsible for a series of 11 burglaries on wealthy individuals in Chicago. The FBI were now involved in the case and traced him using car rental receipts, which had been paid for using Nordahl's credit card. He was eventually arrested outside of a Walmart store in Sparta, Wisconsin on October 15 and held on bail pending extradition. At this point, several police forces became interested in Nordahl, believing that he may have been responsible for unsolved burglaries in their area.

In 1997, as part of a deal with prosecutors, he pleaded guilty to conspiracy to transport stolen goods across state lines. He was held in prison to await sentencing, but released in July 1998 when the sentence hearing was postponed. By this time, the media had given him the nickname 'Burglar to the Stars'. In 2000, he was sentenced to five years in prison for the conspiracy to which he had pleaded guilty in 1997, and also ordered to pay $1 million in restitution. As part of the deal he had made with the prosecutors, he avoided charges for about 50 burglaries across five states.

The exact sum of his thefts is uncertain, but a November 2000 U.S. News & World Report article attributed to him 150 burglaries across 10 states, with a value of up to $3 million. A 2004 profile in The New Yorker quoted an estimate that he had stolen over $10 million worth of silver in 15 states. New Jersey police detective, speaking in the second segment of the 2015 episode "Ea$y Being Green; Stealing the Silver Metal", of the series American Greed, suggests that the decades-long crime spree is valued at upwards of $50 million.

=== Further arrests ===
Soon after being released on parole in April 2001, Nordahl went on the run, having committed more burglaries in Philadelphia. Using aliases, he avoided arrest until March 2002, when he was apprehended by US Marshals in Maple Shade Township, New Jersey. No new burglary charges were brought against him, but he was sentenced to two years in prison for probation violations.

He was discharged in November 2003, but was held in custody awaiting extradition to New York State to face charges of burglary and grand larceny made by the Dutchess County District Attorney's Office. Nordahl, however, became a fugitive again and avoided his extradition hearing.

During this time, a series of skillful mansion break-ins occurred along the East Coast, in which high values of sterling silver were taken. These initially puzzled their investigators, such as Philadelphia detective Jack McGiness, who later explained that "there were all these burglaries that had Nordahl's modus operandi all over them. We thought that he was locked up, but then discovered that he was not."

He was arrested again in Philadelphia in January 2004, after US Marshals again tracked him, this time to the home of his ex-girlfriend's sister. Although he violently resisted arrest, he was eventually apprehended and charged with assaulting police officers and skipping bail. In December 2004, he was sentenced to eight years in prison.

Following release on parole in 2010, he committed burglaries in at least Georgia, South Carolina, and Tennessee, before being arrested in Hilliard, Florida, on August 26, 2013.

In August 2017, a court in Brunswick, Georgia gave Nordahl a sentence of 20 years, with a minimum of 11 years in prison, for a 2013 burglary in St. Simons.

In February 2025, a court in Aiken, South Carolina gave him a sentence of 12 years, but then credited him with six years for time served from his 2017 sentence in Georgia, for burglaries he committed in Aiken in 2013.

== Motive and modus operandi ==
Nordahl gained a reputation for his skilful and audacious burglaries, with comparisons being drawn with John Robie, the cat burglar portrayed by Cary Grant in the Alfred Hitchcock film To Catch a Thief. He often targeted houses while the occupants were still inside sleeping, claiming that he burgled for the excitement and not just for the money. He enjoyed the notoriety he achieved, with one officer commenting that he had an 'ego as big as a house.' When interviewed in 2000, he stated: "It's like a natural high. It fills a void. A lot of times life can be very mundane, very tedious. You want something different."

Nordahl's burglaries generally followed a very particular pattern. He specifically targeted the homes of rich families, which he would research in a local library. His usual method of entry was to cut through or remove panes of glass from a home's French doors or windows and crawl through the opening, thus avoiding alarms that would be set off if the door or window was opened. This was meticulous work that could take over an hour. If necessary, he would then disable the home's alarm system, using knowledge he had gained from careful study.

Once inside a home, Nordahl was very particular about the items he stole. Only interested in genuine antique sterling silver, he would take drawers of items outside and test them using a silver test kit he took with him; plated silver items would be left behind. When arrested in 1996, police found a copy of an up-to-date antiques and collectibles price guide among his possessions, as well as a directory of wealthy Americans.

His careful approach was refined over many years, as he learned from his mistakes. He began to throw away his clothes and shoes after each burglary after police used a shoe print to attribute a New Jersey burglary to Nordahl. He also took increasing care about cleaning up behind himself to avoid leaving footprints or similar marks.

Despite the seriousness of the crimes, police officers had a certain admiration for his professionalism. Wellesley, Massachusetts detective Wayne Cunningham described him as a 'master of his craft.' Captain McGiness stated that Nordahl is a "true professional. He always wears special gloves with little grip dimples on them and can take a pane of glass from your patio door, walk through your house, steal your valuables… and you won't know a thing. Monmouth County, New Jersey detective Lonnie Mason commented: "I'll tell you, I have a lot of respect for his ability as a burglar. He made a business out of it."

Nordahl's career provided the inspiration for an episode of Masterminds, a segment of the show American Greed (Season 9, Episode 3), an episode of Daring Capers, and the Law & Order: Criminal Intent episode "Silver Lining."
