= Give In to Me =

1993 single by Michael Jackson

Single by Michael Jackson featuring Slash

from the album Dangerous
- B-side: "Dirty Diana"; "Beat It"
- Released: February 15, 1993
- Recorded: 1990–1991
- Genre: Hard rock; heavy metal
- Length: 5:29 (album version); 4:42 (vocal version)
- Label: Epic
- Songwriters: Michael Jackson; Bill Bottrell (Slash Solo)
- Producers: Michael Jackson; Bill Bottrell

Michael Jackson singles chronology
"Heal the World" (1992)	"Give In to Me" (1993)	"Whatzupwitu" (1993)

Slash singles chronology
"Give In to Me" (1993)	"Fix" (1997)

Music video
- "Give In to Me" on YouTube

"Give In to Me" is a song by American singer-songwriter Michael Jackson, released as the seventh single from his eighth studio album, Dangerous (1991). Released in February 1993 by Epic Records, the song peaked at number one in New Zealand for four consecutive weeks and at number two on the UK Singles Chart. The track was written and produced by Jackson and Bill Bottrell, and features Guns N' Roses guitarist Slash. A hard rock and heavy metal song, several critics wrote that the song has an aggressive sexual flavor. It was also released in various European countries, Australia and Japan. The single release's B-sides include the album versions of "Dirty Diana" and "Beat It".

== Composition ==
This song is written in the key of E minor. Jackson's vocals spans from G_{3} to B_{4}. It has a moderately slow tempo of 87 beats per minute. Stylistically, "Give In to Me" is a hard rock and heavy metal ballad.

== Critical reception ==
Professional ratings
Review scores
Source	Rating
AllMusic	2/5 stars

"Give In to Me" received positive reviews from contemporary music critics. Entertainment Weekly editor David Browne praised Jackson's delivery, writing, "when his voice isn't competing with drum machines, it's menacing on the creepy 'Give In to Me' (his best-ever shot at hard rock)." In his weekly UK chart commentary, James Masterton said, that with "Who Is It" and "Black or White", the single "is one of the few tracks on the album that represent Jackson at his very best and not stifled by machines."

Alan Jones from Music Week described it as "a moody ballad which unfurls slowly before reaching a fine climax, neatly juxtaposed by Slash's wailing guitar solo." He added that it "will be a substantial and deserved hit." Alan Light of Rolling Stone felt that "Give In to Me" "flirts with something more disturbing as Jackson sings, 'Don't try to understand me/Just simply do the things I say' in a grittier, throaty voice while Slash's guitar whips and soars behind him."

== Music video ==
The music video is a performance-style live-action concert.

The music video for "Give In to Me" features Jackson performing the song on stage at an indoor rock concert with ex Living Colour bassist Muzz Skillings, Guns N' Roses guitarists Slash and Gilby Clarke, as well as the band's touring keyboardist Teddy Andreadis and legendary session drummer Tony Thompson. Loud explosions are later heard with visuals of stylized electrical arcs and Jackson dancing as they run down his body. The last scene shows one electrical arc running down Jackson's body, an unintentional effect that was left in. The video is featured on the video albums: Dangerous: The Short Films and Michael Jackson's Vision.

It was shot on June 25, 1992, in Munich, Germany, just two days before the opening concert of the Dangerous World Tour on June 27. The pyrotechnics appearing on the video are computer-generated and were added later on. It was later made available on YouTube in 2009.

== Track listing ==
- 7-inch single
1. "Give In to Me" – 5:28
2. "Dirty Diana" – 4:52
- Cassette Single K7 Audio Tape
1. "Give In to Me" (vocal version) – 4:42
2. "Dirty Diana" (edit version) – 4:40
- Spain Vinyl, 12", 45 RPM
1. "Give In to Me" (album version) – 5:28
2. "Dirty Diana" (album version) – 4:52
3. "Give In to Me" (vocal version) – 4:42
4. "Beat It" (album version) – 4:17
- Thailand Cassette, single
1. "Give In to Me" (album version) – 5:28
2. "Beat It" (album version) – 4:17
3. "Dirty Diana" (album version) – 4:52
4. "Beat It" (album version) – 4:17
- Austria CD single
1. "Give In to Me" – 5:28
2. "Dirty Diana" – 4:52
3. "Beat It" – 4:17
- UK CD single
1. "Give In to Me" (vocal version) – 4:42
2. "Dirty Diana" – 4:52
3. "Beat It" – 4:17

== Personnel ==
- All vocals by Michael Jackson
- Mellotron, keyboards, guitars, bass and drums by Bill Bottrell
- Additional guitar by Tim Pierce
- Special guitar performance by Slash

== Production ==
- Arranged and produced by Michael Jackson and Bill Bottrell
- Recorded by Bill Bottrell; guitar recorded by Jim Mitchell, with assistance by Craig Brock
- Mixed by Bill Bottrell

== Charts ==
=== Weekly charts ===
Weekly chart performance for "Give In to Me"
Chart (1993)	Peak position
Australia (ARIA)	4
Austria (Ö3 Austria Top 40)	12
Belgium (Ultratop 50 Flanders)	13
Brazil (UPI)	3
Denmark (IFPI)	7
Europe (Eurochart Hot 100)	4
Europe (European Dance Radio)	17
Europe (European Hit Radio)	1
France (SNEP)	7
Germany (GfK)	10
Iceland (Íslenski Listinn Topp 40)	23
Ireland (IRMA)	2
Netherlands (Dutch Top 40)	3
Netherlands (Single Top 100)	4
New Zealand (Recorded Music NZ)	1
Norway (VG-lista)	7
Spain (AFYVE)	6
Sweden (Sverigetopplistan)	15
Switzerland (Schweizer Hitparade)	7
UK Singles (Official Charts)	2
UK Airplay (Music Week)	2

2009 weekly chart performance for "Give In to Me"
Chart (2009)	Peak position
Switzerland (Schweizer Hitparade)	35
UK Singles (Official Charts)	74

2011 weekly chart performance for "Give In to Me"
Chart (2011)	Peak position
Hungary (Single Top 40)	8

=== Year-end charts ===
Year-end chart performance for "Give In to Me"
Chart (1993)	Position
Australia (ARIA)	32
Belgium (Ultratop)	81
Europe (Eurochart Hot 100)	31
Europe (European Hit Radio)	34
Germany (Media Control)	63
Netherlands (Dutch Top 40)	51
Netherlands (Single Top 100)	52
New Zealand (RIANZ)	7
UK Singles (OCC)	50
UK Airplay (Music Week)	40

== Certifications ==
Certifications for "Give In to Me"
Region	Certification	Certified units/sales
Australia (ARIA)	Gold	35,000^{^}
New Zealand (RMNZ)	Gold	5,000^{*}
^{*} Sales figures based on certification alone.^{^} Shipments figures based on certification alone.

== Release history ==
Release dates and formats for "Give In to Me"
Region	Date	Format(s)	Label(s)	Ref.
United Kingdom	February 15, 1993	7-inch vinyl; CD; cassette	Epic	
Australia	March 14, 1993	CD; cassette	Epic	
Japan	April 1, 1993	Mini-CD	Epic	

== Cover versions ==
- In 2000, Eminem used the sample of "Give In to Me" in his song "Under the Influence" from the album The Marshall Mathers LP.
- In 2009, Allison Iraheta performed the song on the eighth season of American Idol, and a studio recording was released on iTunes.
- In 2012, Three Days Grace included a cover of this song on their album Transit of Venus, and was recorded the day after Jackson's death in June 2009.
- In 2023, Lord of the Lost included a cover of this song on their album Weapons of Mass Seduction.
