= Dangerous: The Short Films =

Video by Michael Jackson
- Released: December 7, 1993
- Recorded: 1991–1993
- Genre: Pop
- Length: 1:52:00
- Label: Epic Music Video; Sony Music
- Director: Various
- Producer: Various

Michael Jackson chronology
Dangerous: The Short Films (1993)	Video Greatest Hits – HIStory (1995)

Dangerous: The Short Films is a collection of music videos from the Dangerous album by Michael Jackson released initially on VHS, LaserDisc and double Video CD (in Asia market only) in 1993 and reissued on DVD in 2000. It was re-packaged with Dangerous in a two disc set in 2008.

== Track listing ==
1. "Intro"
2. "Brace Yourself"
3. "Reaction to Black or White"
4. "Black or White" (original long version w/graffiti)
5. "Black or White: Behind the Scenes"
6. "Grammy Legend Award 1993"
7. "Heal the World" (Super Bowl XXVII halftime version)
8. "Remember the Time: Behind the Scenes"
9. "Remember the Time"
10. "Will You Be There"
11. "In the Closet: Behind the Scenes"
12. "In the Closet"
13. "Ryan White"
14. "Gone Too Soon"
15. "NAACP Image Awards"
16. "Jam: Behind the Scenes"
17. "Jam"
18. "Introduction to Heal the World"
19. "Heal the World"
20. "Give In to Me"
21. "I'll Be There" (Pepsi commercial) (Note: The Pepsi commercial was slightly edited; almost all Pepsi references in the original were replaced with archive Jackson 5 pictures and video.)
22. "Who Is It"
23. "Dangerous: Behind the Scenes"
24. "Dangerous" (Note: Consists of footage from the Dangerous World Tour.)
25. "Credits" (with the music of "Why You Wanna Trip on Me") (Note: Various scenes from the Pepsi commercial "Dreams" by David Lynch.) (Note: Moreover, various artworks from the album cover are shown in quick succession.)

== Certifications ==
Certifications and sales for Dangerous: The Short Films
Region	Certification	Certified units/sales
Argentina (CAPIF)	Platinum	8,000^{^}
Australia (ARIA)	2× Platinum	30,000^{^}
Germany (BVMI)	Platinum	50,000^{^}
Mexico (AMPROFON)	3× Platinum	60,000^{^}
Spain (PROMUSICAE)	Platinum	25,000^{^}
United Kingdom (BPI)	Platinum	50,000^{^}
United States (RIAA)	3× Platinum	300,000^{^}
^{^} Shipments figures based on certification alone.
