= Remember the Time =

Single by Michael Jackson

from the album Dangerous
- B-side: "Come Together"
- Released: January 14, 1992
- Recorded: February 1991
- Genre: R&B; new jack swing
- Length: 3:59
- Label: Epic
- Songwriters: Teddy Riley; Michael Jackson; Bernard Belle
- Producers: Michael Jackson; Teddy Riley

Michael Jackson singles chronology
| "Black or White" (1991) | "Remember the Time" (1992) | "In the Closet" (1992) |

Music video
- "Remember the Time" on YouTube

"Remember the Time" is a song by the American singer and songwriter Michael Jackson. It was released by Epic Records on January 14, 1992, as the second single from Jackson's eighth album, Dangerous (1991). The song was written and composed by Teddy Riley, Jackson and Bernard Belle, and produced by Riley and Jackson. The song's lyrics are written about remembering having fallen in love with someone.

"Remember the Time" was generally well-received by contemporary critics. The song was commercially successful, peaking at numbers two and three on the US Cash Box Top 100 and Billboard Hot 100, and number one on the Billboard Hot R&B Singles and Top 40/Mainstream charts. It is certified 3× Platinum by the Recording Industry Association of America (RIAA). Internationally, the song was a Top-10 hit in nine countries, peaking at number one in New Zealand, number two in Spain and number three in the United Kingdom.

A nine-minute music video directed by John Singleton, was released for the song and broadcast live on Fox, BET and MTV on February 2, 1992, the video received a Nielsen Rating of 13.1 on Fox. The video is set in Ancient Egypt and features appearances of Jackson, Eddie Murphy, Iman, Tommy "Tiny" Lister and Magic Johnson. It has appeared on the video albums: Dangerous: The Short Films, Video Greatest Hits – HIStory and Michael Jackson's Vision. The music video, along with other videos from Dangerous, was frequently shown on MTV.

== Background ==
"Remember the Time" was written by Teddy Riley, Michael Jackson and Bernard Belle, and was produced by Riley and Jackson. It was recorded at Record One studios. It was released as the second single from Michael Jackson's eighth studio album, Dangerous, on January 14, 1992. The song's music was compared to Jackson's 1979 single, "Rock with You" from his Off the Wall album.

Co-writer Teddy Riley supposedly stated in a 1996 Los Angeles Times interview that he was inspired to write the song after hearing Jackson describe "falling in love with the woman he just married". The article assumes he is referring to Debbie Rowe but Riley himself makes no mention of her. In a 2011 reply to a fan on Twitter, Riley denied that the song was about Rowe. Others have noted that when the single was originally released in 1992, Jackson dedicated the song to Diana Ross.

== Composition ==
"Remember the Time" is a R&B and new jack swing song. The lyrics recall a youthful love affair: "Do you remember when we fell in love/We were young and innocent then". The song is set in the key of F minor with Jackson's voice range from E♭_{3} to B♭_{5}. The song's tempo is moderate at 116 beats per minute.

== Live performances ==
"Remember the Time" was rehearsed for the Dangerous World Tour but was ultimately cut due to Jackson finding the extensive setlist too tiring, and worrying that performances of "Remember The Time" would not be up to par with the other songs in the concerts. At the 1993 Soul Train Music Awards, the song won the award for Best R&B/Soul Single – Male. Jackson appeared with an injured foot and on crutches, but was able to perform the song seated on the throne, surrounded by dancers.

== Critical reception ==
"Remember the Time" was generally well received by contemporary music critics. Chris Lacy from Albumism noted that "the warmth and nostalgia" of the song "harkens back to Jackson's Motown roots". Stephen Thomas Erlewine, a writer for AllMusic, commented that Dangerous had "plenty" of "professional craftsmanship at its peak" because of "such fine singles" like "In the Closet" and "Remember the Time". Erlewine also listed it as being a highlight from the album. Larry Flick from Billboard magazine said the song "shows the King of Pop downplaying his signature whoops and shrieks in favor a decidedly soulful and affecting vocal performance. Insinuating new-jack grooves work well, encasing an immediately memorable hook." A reviewer from Cashbox named it Pick of the Week, noting, "This smooth dance ballad sounds like it could have come from the Off the Wall album and has more of the mouth noise, whoops and hollers that we guess will take Mr. Jackson several more albums to out-grow."

Pan-European magazine Music & Media wrote that it is a "danceable multi-format smash, dedicated to his mentor Diana Ross." Jon Pareles of The New York Times commented that "titles like 'Remember the Time', 'She Drives Me Wild' and 'Give In to Me'" tell the lyrics' "whole story—though they don't suggest the wretched tone he has when he sings them." A writer from People Magazine said that "the strength of this record stems from bouncy, up-tempo pop" like "Remember the Time". Alan Light, a writer for Rolling Stone, stated that he felt it was the "most lighthearted musical track on the album" and described the song's lyrics as telling of a "blissful romance only to ask, 'So why did it end?'" Richard Harrington, a writer for The Washington Post, described "Remember the Time" as being "wistful", commenting that he felt that the song featured Jackson's "least affected vocal performance" but that it "builds an engaging, radio-friendly momentum".

== Chart performance ==
"Remember the Time" peaked at number three on the US Billboard Hot 100 on March 7, 1992, seven weeks after the single's release. The song saw similar success on other Billboard charts; topping the Hot R&B Singles chart on March 7, and peaking at number two on the Dance Club Play chart on April 4, 1992, and number 15 on the Adult Contemporary chart on March 21 in the same year. The song also peaked at number one on the Cash Box Top 100 and at number two on the Billboard Hot Dance Music/Maxi Singles Sales chart. It was certified Gold by the Recording Industry Association of America for the shipment of over 500,000 units in the United States in March 1992, and later Triple Platinum in 2022. The song saw similar commercial success internationally, charting within the top twenty positions in all major territories at the time of its release. In the United Kingdom, "Remember the Time" first entered the chart on February 15, 1992, placing at number six. The following week, on February 22, the song charted at number three, where it peaked; the song remained on the chart for a total of eight weeks.

"Remember the Time" topped the New Zealand chart for two consecutive weeks, having first entered the chart at number three on February 23. It peaked at number four in the Netherlands and Switzerland. The song also charted within the Top 10 on the French, Australian, Swedish, Italian, and Norwegian charts; peaking at numbers five, six, eight and ten. It peaked at number 16 in Austria. Having been re-issued for Jackson's Visionary campaign in 2006, "Remember the Time" peaked at number two in Spain on the issue dated May 14, 2006. After Jackson's death in June 2009, his music saw a surge in popularity. In the United Kingdom, on the chart of July 11, the song re-entered at number 81.

== Music video ==
The accompanying music video for "Remember the Time" was filmed in January 1992 at the Universal Studios Hollywood backlot. Prior to the release of the video, Jackson's record label promoted it by releasing clips, as well as releasing behind the scenes clips of making the video. The nine-minute video was promoted as a "short film". It premiered on ABC, NBC, Fox, BET, and MTV on February 2, 1992, the Fox broadcast of Remember the Time recorded a Nielsen rating of 13.1. After the video premiered on MTV, the channel aired a "rockumentary" called "More Dangerous Than Ever" which included glimpses of the making of the video. Jackson's record label would not release the video's budget figures. Directed by John Singleton and choreographed by Fatima Robinson, the video was an elaborate production and became one of Jackson's longest videos at over nine minutes. It was set in ancient Egypt and featured groundbreaking visual effects and appearances by Eddie Murphy, Iman, Magic Johnson, Tom "Tiny" Lister Jr., The Pharcyde and Wylie Draper, who portrayed Jackson as an older teenager and a young adult in the made-for-TV movie The Jacksons: An American Dream.

Jackson appears in the video as a hooded wizard who enters an Egyptian palace and attempts to entertain the pharaoh Ramses the Great's bored wife, Nefertari (Iman). A juggler and fire-eater had previously failed, and the queen sent them to be fed to lions and decapitated, respectively. The wizard steps to her throne and sings to her, asking her if she "remembers the time" they were together. The pharaoh (Murphy) hardly appreciates this move and summons his guards. The wizard hides from the searching guards, secretly meets Nefertari, and kisses her passionately. Jackson begins an elaborate, Egyptian-style choreography with the pharaoh's servants. When the guards find him, Jackson shapeshifts into golden sand and escapes, as if carried away by the wind. In the video, Jackson is dressed in a costume made of gold satin. He wears golden chain mail, a white skirt with a phallic dangling sash, black pants and black boots. This video features a physically complicated dance routine that became the centerpiece of other videos from the Dangerous album.

The music video was generally well received by music critics. Ira Robbins of Entertainment Weekly described the "Remember the Time" video as being a "gorgeous ancient Egyptian extravaganza". The music video appeared on the video albums: Dangerous: The Short Films, Video Greatest Hits – HIStory and Michael Jackson's Vision. The music video, along with other videos from Dangerous, was frequently shown on MTV.

== Track listing ==
- US maxi CD single
1. "Remember the Time" (Silky Soul 7-inch mix) – 4:21
2. "Remember the Time" (New Jack radio mix) – 4:00
3. "Remember the Time" (12-inch main mix) – 4:47
4. "Remember the Time" (E-Smoove's Late Nite mix) – 7:20
5. "Remember the Time" (Maurice's Underground mix) – 7:29
6. "Black or White" (Clivillés & Cole radio mix) – 3:33
7. "Black or White" (House With Guitar radio mix) – 3:53
8. "Black or White" (Clivillés & Cole House/Club mix) – 7:33
9. "Black or White" (The Underground club mix) – 7:30
- European maxi CD single
1. "Remember the Time" – 3:59
2. "Remember the Time" (Silky Soul 7-inch mix) – 4:18
3. "Remember the Time" (New Jack main mix) – 6:50
4. "Remember the Time" (12-inch main mix) – 4:37
5. "Remember the Time" (New Jack mix) – 6:40
6. "Remember the Time" (Silky Soul 12-inch mix) – 7:03
7. "Remember the Time" (Silky Soul dub) – 6:23
8. "Remember the Time" (E-Smoove's Late Nite mix) – 7:14
9. "Come Together" – 5:27

== Personnel ==
- Written and composed by Teddy Riley, Michael Jackson and Bernard Belle
- Produced by Teddy Riley and Michael Jackson
- Recorded and mixed by Bruce Swedien, Teddy Riley and Dave Way
- Solo and background vocals, vocal arrangement by Michael Jackson
- Keyboards, synthesizers, drum programming and synthesizer arrangements by Teddy Riley
- Sequencing and programming by Wayne Cobham

== Charts ==
=== Weekly charts ===
Weekly chart performance
| Chart (1992) | Peak position |
|---|---|
| Australia (ARIA) | 6 |
| Austria (Ö3 Austria Top 40) | 16 |
| Belgium (Utratop 50 Flanders) | 2 |
| Canada Top Singles (RPM) | 2 |
| Canada Adult Contemporary (RPM) | 5 |
| Canada Dance/Urban (RPM) | 1 |
| Canada Retail Singles (The Record) | 5 |
| Canada Contemporary Hit Radio (The Record) | 1 |
| Denmark (IFPI) | 4 |
| Ecuador (UPI) | 6 |
| Estonia (Eesti Top 15) | 6 |
| Europe (European Hot 100 Singles) | 3 |
| Europe (European Dance Radio) | 2 |
| Europe (European Hit Radio) | 1 |
| Finland (Suomen virallinen singlelista) | 7 |
| Finland (Suomen virallinen radiosoittolista) | 10 |
| France (SNEP) | 5 |
| Germany (Official German Charts) | 8 |
| Greece (IFPI) | 5 |
| Ireland (IRMA) | 3 |
| Italy (Musica e dischi) | 6 |
| Netherlands (Dutch Top 40) | 3 |
| Netherlands (Single Top 100) | 4 |
| New Zealand (Recorded Music NZ) | 1 |
| Norway (VG-lista) | 10 |
| Portugal (AFP) | 10 |
| Spain (AFYVE) | 3 |
| Sweden (Sverigetopplistan) | 8 |
| Switzerland (Schweizer Hitparade) | 4 |
| UK Singles (Official Charts) | 3 |
| UK Airplay (Music Week) | 1 |
| UK Dance (Music Week) | 7 |
| UK Club Chart (Music Week) | 11 |
| Uruguay (UPI) | 5 |
| US Billboard Hot 100 | 3 |
| US Adult Contemporary (Billboard) | 15 |
| US Dance Club Songs (Billboard) | 2 |
| US Dance Singles Sales (Billboard) | 1 |
| US Hot R&B/Hip-Hop Songs (Billboard) | 1 |
| US Cash Box Top 100 | 1 |

2006 weekly chart performance
| Chart (2006) | Peak position |
|---|---|
| France (SNEP) | 63 |
| Ireland (IRMA) | 26 |
| Italy (FIMI) | 10 |
| Netherlands (Single Top 100) | 44 |
| Spain (PROMUSICAE) | 2 |
| UK Singles (OCC) | 22 |
| UK Hip Hop/R&B (Official Charts) | 3 |

2007 weekly chart performance
| Chart (2007) | Peak position |
|---|---|
| Spain (PROMUSICAE) | 15 |

2009 weekly chart performance
| Chart (2009) | Peak position |
|---|---|
| Australia (ARIA) | 40 |
| Netherlands (Single Top 100) | 68 |
| Switzerland (Schweizer Hitparade) | 58 |
| UK Singles (OCC) | 81 |
| US Digital Song Sales (Billboard) | 35 |

2026 weekly chart performance
| Chart (2026) | Peak position |
|---|---|
| Global 200 (Billboard) | 104 |

=== Year-end charts ===
Year-end chart performance
| Chart (1992) | Position |
|---|---|
| Australia (ARIA) | 80 |
| Belgium (Ultratop) | 36 |
| Brazil (Crowley) | 48 |
| Canada Top Singles (RPM) | 24 |
| Canada Adult Contemporary (RPM) | 56 |
| Canada Dance/Urban (RPM) | 17 |
| Europe (European Hot 100 Singles) | 29 |
| Europe (European Dance Radio) | 7 |
| Europe (European Hit Radio) | 17 |
| Germany (Media Control) | 62 |
| Netherlands (Dutch Top 40) | 57 |
| Netherlands (Single Top 100) | 27 |
| New Zealand (RIANZ) | 30 |
| Sweden (Topplistan) | 72 |
| Switzerland (Schweizer Hitparade) | 31 |
| UK Singles (OCC) | 62 |
| UK Airplay (Music Week) | 42 |
| US Billboard Hot 100 | 19 |
| US Dance Club Play (Billboard) | 43 |
| US Hot R&B Singles (Billboard) | 18 |
| US Maxi-Singles Sales (Billboard) | 17 |
| US Cash Box Top 100 | 13 |

== Certifications ==
Certifications
| Region | Certification | Certified units/sales |
|---|---|---|
| Australia (ARIA) | Gold | 35,000^{^} |
| Canada (Music Canada) | Platinum | 80,000^{‡} |
| Denmark (IFPI Danmark) | Gold | 45,000^{‡} |
| New Zealand (RMNZ) | 2× Platinum | 60,000^{‡} |
| Spain (Promusicae) | Gold | 50,000^{‡} |
| United Kingdom (BPI) | Platinum | 600,000^{‡} |
| United States (RIAA) | 3× Platinum | 3,000,000^{‡} |
^{^} Shipments figures based on certification alone.^{‡} Sales+streaming figures based on certification alone.

== Release history ==
Release dates and formats
| Region | Version | Date | Format(s) | Label(s) | Ref. |
|---|---|---|---|---|---|
| United States | Original | January 14, 1992 | —N/a | Epic | |
| Australia | Original | January 27, 1992 | CD; cassette | Epic | |
| United Kingdom | Original | February 3, 1992 | 7-inch vinyl; 12-inch vinyl; CD; cassette | Epic | |
| Japan | Original | February 21, 1992 | Mini-CD | Epic | |
| Australia | Remixes | March 9, 1992 | 12-inch vinyl; CD; cassette | Epic | |
| Japan | Remixes | March 25, 1992 | CD | Epic | |

== See also ==
- List of number-one R&B singles of 1992 (U.S.)
