= Heal the World =

1992 single by Michael Jackson

Single by Michael Jackson

from the album Dangerous
- B-side: "She Drives Me Wild"
- Released: November 9, 1992
- Recorded: 1989–1991
- Genre: Blues; pop
- Length: 6:25 (album version); 4:32 (7-inch edit); 4:55 (7-inch edit with intro)
- Label: Epic
- Songwriter: Michael Jackson
- Producers: Michael Jackson; Bruce Swedien

Michael Jackson singles chronology
"Who Is It" (1992)	"Heal the World" (1992)	"Give In to Me" (1993)

Music video
- "Heal the World" on YouTube

"Heal the World" is a song recorded by American singer Michael Jackson from his eighth studio album, Dangerous (1991). It was released on November 9, 1992, by Epic Records as the sixth single from the album. It was written and composed by Jackson, and produced by Jackson and Bruce Swedien. It is a song steeped with antiwar lyrics and Jackson's wish for the humanity of making the world a better place. The music video for the song was directed by Joe Pytka.

In a 2001 Internet chat with fans, Jackson said that "Heal the World" is the song he was most proud to have created. He also created the Heal the World Foundation, a charitable organization which was designed to improve the lives of children. The organization was also meant to teach children how to help others. This concept of 'betterment for all' would become a centerpiece for the Dangerous World Tour. In the documentary Living with Michael Jackson, Jackson said he created the song in his "Giving Tree" at Neverland Ranch.

An ensemble performance of "We Are the World" and "Heal the World" closed Jackson's memorial service at the Staples Center in Los Angeles on July 7, 2009. The song was performed as rehearsed by Jackson at the venue just weeks earlier, in preparation for his planned This Is It concerts in London along with "Dirty Diana". R&B singer Ciara sang the song as a tribute to Jackson at the 2009 BET Awards.

The song was played at the funeral of James Bulger, and Jackson also donated the song to be used as the anthem for the James Bulger Red Balloon Centre, a school for children to go to if they are being bullied or have learning difficulties.

== Composition ==
This song is written in the key of A major (but later transitions to B major as a choir starts singing, and the last chorus in C♯ major), and it spans from E_{3} to C♯_{5}. It has a tempo of 80 beats per minute.

The lyrics includes a reference to Isaiah 2:4: "See the nations turn their swords into plowshares."

== Reception ==
=== Critical reception ===
Professional ratings
Review scores
Source	Rating
AllMusic	2/5 stars

Chris Lacy from Albumism described the song as "a beautifully understated anthem whose lyrics call for universal improvement." AllMusic editor Stephen Thomas Erlewine called it "middle-class soft." Larry Flick from Billboard viewed "Heal the World" as a "oh-so-sweet call for peace and love". He added, "Although tune sounds a bit like 'We Are the World', the sincerity in his vocal cuts through a somewhat overblown arrangement and choir climax." Randy Clark from Cash Box said that it's "musically about as close a jab at his previous 'Cry', 'Man in the Mirror' and 'We Are the World' as he could pull off without Quincy Jones and the superstar backing." He added that "the sing-along ballad features mostly Michael's vocals, bringing in a choir at the end for the full effect. The universal message is also the theme of his current world tour."

After Jackson's death, the Daily Vault's Michael R. Smith wrote, "Certainly, message songs like 'Heal the World' and 'Gone Too Soon' have a striking and sad resonance now that Jackson is no longer with us, so in that way his legacy is preserved and his music does live on." David Browne of Entertainment Weekly praised the song, "And when his voice isn't competing with drum machines, it has rarely sounded stronger-achingly pure". Rolling Stone's Alan Light was not satisfied, calling it "a Hallmark-card knockoff of 'We Are the World'." A more scathing criticism came from Bill Wyman of Vulture, who ranked the song the worst of Michael Jackson's entire output, criticising its "overweening vocalizings" and "unrelenting, almost sociopathic key changes".

=== Commercial reception ===
The song reached number two in the UK Singles Chart in December 1992, kept off the number one position by Whitney Houston's "I Will Always Love You". It peaked number 27 on the US Billboard Hot 100.

== Music video ==
The accompanying music video for the song was directed by Joe Pytka and features children living in countries suffering from unrest, especially Burundi. It is also one of only a handful that does not feature Jackson. The version of the video included on Dangerous: The Short Films and Michael Jackson's Vision contains an introductory video that features a speech from Jackson taken from the special "spoken word" version of the track. This version was not included on Video Greatest Hits – HIStory featuring the music video. Jackson performed the song in the Super Bowl XXVII halftime show with a 35,000 person flash card performance.

== Track listing ==
- UK and European versions
1. "Prelude / Heal The World" (7-inch edit) – 4:32
2. "Prelude / Heal The World" (Album Version) - 5:25
3. "She Drives Me Wild" – 3:41
4. "Man in The Mirror" - 4:55
- 7-inch single and cassette single
1. "Heal the World" (7-inch edit) – 4:32
2. "She Drives Me Wild" – 3:41
- 12-inch single
1. "Heal the World" (album version) – 6:25
2. "Wanna Be Startin' Somethin'" (Brothers in Rhythm house mix) – 7:40
3. "Don't Stop 'til You Get Enough" (Roger's Underground Solution) – 6:18
4. "Rock with You" (Masters at Work remix) – 5:29
- CD maxi single
1. "Heal the World" (7-inch edit) – 4:32
2. "Heal the World" (7-inch edit with intro) – 4:55
3. "Heal the World" (LP version) – 6:25
4. "She Drives Me Wild" (album version) – 3:41
- Visionary DualDisc single

DVD side

1. "Heal the World" (music video) – 7:31
2. "Heal the World" (single version) – 4:32
3. "Will You Be There" – 5:52

== Personnel ==
- Written and composed by Michael Jackson
- Produced by Michael Jackson
- Co-produced by Bruce Swedien
- Recorded and mixed by Bruce Swedien and Matt Forger
- Lead and background vocals by Michael Jackson
- Rhythm arrangement by Michael Jackson
- Vocal arrangement by Michael Jackson and John Bahler
- Choir arrangement by John Bahler, featuring the John Bahler Singers
- Prelude composed, arranged and conducted by Marty Paich
- Keyboards: David Paich and Brad Buxer
- Synthesizers: Michael Boddicker, David Paich and Steve Porcaro
- Drums: Jeff Porcaro, John Robinson (tom overdubs)
- Percussion: Bryan Loren
- Orchestra arranged and conducted by Marty Paich
- Ending solo vocal: Christa Collins
- Playground girl: Ashley Farell

== Charts ==
=== Weekly charts ===
Weekly chart performance
Chart (1992–1993)	Peak position
Australia (ARIA)	20
Austria (Ö3 Austria Top 40)	4
Belgium (Ultratop 50 Flanders)	3
Canada Contemporary Hit Radio (The Record)	22
Canada Retail Singles (The Record)	17
Canada Top Singles (RPM)	21
Canada Adult Contemporary (RPM)	4
Dominican Republic (UPI)	4
Estonia (Eesti Top 30)	14
Europe (Eurochart Hot 100)	3
Europe (European Dance Radio)	2
France (SNEP)	2
Germany (GfK)	3
Ireland (IRMA)	2
Italy (Musica e dischi)	8
Netherlands (Dutch Top 40)	6
Netherlands (Single Top 100)	4
New Zealand (Recorded Music NZ)	3
Norway (VG-lista)	6
Panama (UPI)	6
Portugal (AFP)	7
Sweden (Sverigetopplistan)	15
Switzerland (Schweizer Hitparade)	5
UK Singles (Official Charts)	2
UK Airplay (Music Week)	1
UK Dance (Music Week)	6
US Billboard Hot 100	27
US Adult Contemporary (Billboard)	9
US Hot R&B/Hip-Hop Songs (Billboard)	62
US Pop Airplay (Billboard)	21
US Cash Box Top 100	26

2006 weekly chart performance
Chart (2006)	Peak position
Australia (ARIA)	63
France (SNEP)	60
Germany (GfK)	90
Ireland (IRMA)	22
Italy (FIMI)	13
Netherlands (Single Top 100)	40
Spain (Promusicae)	1
UK Singles (Official Charts)	27

2009 weekly chart performance
Chart (2009)	Peak position
Australia (ARIA)	26
Austria (Ö3 Austria Top 40)	22
Belgium (Back Catalogue Singles Flanders)	3
Canada Digital Song Sales (Billboard)	28
Denmark (Tracklisten)	7
Europe (European Hot 100)	24
France Download (SNEP)	6
Germany (GfK)	18
Italy (FIMI)	4
Netherlands (Single Top 100)	16
New Zealand (Recorded Music NZ)	19
Norway (VG-lista)	3
Spain (Promusicae)	44
Sweden (Sverigetopplistan)	18
Switzerland (Schweizer Hitparade)	9
UK Singles (Official Charts)	44
US Digital Song Sales (Billboard)	39

=== Year-end charts ===
1992 year-end chart performance
Chart (1992)	Position
Netherlands (Dutch Top 40)	88
UK Singles (OCC)	9

1993 year-end chart performance
Chart (1993)	Position
Austria (Ö3 Austria Top 40)	18
Belgium (Ultratop)	56
Canada Adult Contemporary (RPM)	43
Europe (Eurochart Hot 100)	22
Germany (Media Control)	34
Netherlands (Single Top 100)	50
Switzerland (Schweizer Hitparade)	15
US Adult Contemporary (Billboard)	35

== Certifications ==
Certifications
Region	Certification	Certified units/sales
Australia (ARIA)	Gold	35,000^{^}
Canada (Music Canada)	Gold	40,000^{‡}
Denmark (IFPI Danmark)	Gold	45,000^{‡}
France (SNEP)	Silver	125,000^{*}
Germany (BVMI)	Gold	250,000^{^}
Italy (FIMI) sales since 2009	Gold	25,000^{‡}
Japan (RIAJ) Full-length ringtone	Gold	100,000^{*}
New Zealand (RMNZ)	Platinum	30,000^{‡}
Spain (Promusicae)	Gold	30,000^{‡}
United Kingdom (BPI)	Gold	400,000^{^}
^{*} Sales figures based on certification alone.^{^} Shipments figures based on certification alone.^{‡} Sales+streaming figures based on certification alone.

== Release history ==
Release dates and formats
Region	Date	Format(s)	Label(s)	Ref.
Australia	November 9, 1992	CD; cassette	Epic	
Japan	November 21, 1992	Mini-CD	Epic	
United Kingdom	November 23, 1992	7-inch vinyl; CD; cassette	Epic	
United Kingdom	November 30, 1992	12-inch vinyl	Epic	
Australia	December 21, 1992	12-inch vinyl	Epic	

== Cover versions ==
- The Brazilian singer Xuxa Meneghel made a Spanish version named Curar El Mundo in 1992.
- The Brazilian band Roupa Nova made a Portuguese version named A Paz in 2010.
- In 2016 Mumbai-based folk music duo Maati Baani (formed by Nirali Kartik and Kartik Shah) released a cover of the song featuring 45 child artists between the ages of 5 and 13 from India, South Africa, Russia, Canada, Japan and the United States, displaying an eclectic array of musical styles.
- Jillian Ward covered the song in 2021 for the Frontliners during the COVID-19 pandemic in the Philippines.

== See also ==
- List of anti-war songs
