= Black or White =

1991 single by Michael Jackson

Single by Michael Jackson

from the album Dangerous
- B-side: "Black or White (Instrumental)"
- Released: November 4, 1991
- Recorded: 1989–1990
- Studio: Westlake (Los Angeles); Record One (Los Angeles); Larrabee (Hollywood)
- Genre: Pop rock; new jack swing
- Length: 4:16 (album version); 3:22 (single version)
- Label: Epic
- Songwriters: Michael Jackson; Bill Bottrell
- Producers: Michael Jackson; Bill Bottrell

Michael Jackson singles chronology
"Liberian Girl" (1989)	"Black or White" (1991)	"Remember the Time" (1992)

Music videos
- "Black or White" (Short version) on YouTube
- "Black or White" (Long version) on YouTube

Audio sample
- file; help

"Black or White" is a song by American singer and songwriter Michael Jackson, released by Epic Records on November 4, 1991, as the lead single from Jackson's eighth album, Dangerous (1991). Jackson wrote, composed, and produced the track with record producer Bill Bottrell, who provides an uncredited rap performance. Epic Records described it as "a rock 'n' roll dance song about racial harmony".

"Black or White" reached number one on the US Billboard Hot 100 on December 7, 1991, the fastest to reach the position since the Beatles' 1969 single "Get Back". It stayed at the position for seven weeks, making Jackson the first artist to have multiple number-one songs on the Billboard Hot 100 in the 1970s, 1980s and 1990s. In addition to having received triple Platinum certification by the Recording Industry Association of America (RIAA), "Black or White" reached number one on the charts of at least 20 countries and territories, including the UK, Australia, Belgium, Canada, Cuba, Denmark, Finland, France, Ireland, Italy, Mexico, New Zealand, Norway, Spain, Sweden, Switzerland, Turkey, Zimbabwe and the Eurochart Hot 100. It was the best-selling single worldwide of 1992.

The music video was directed by John Landis, who had previously directed Jackson's 1983 music video for Thriller, and featured Macaulay Culkin, Another Bad Creation, Tess Harper, and George Wendt. It was co-choreographed by Jackson and Vincent Paterson. It premiered simultaneously in 69 countries on November 14, 1991, with an audience of 500 million viewers, the most ever for a music video. It premiered on MTV, BET, VH1, and Fox, which gave them their highest Nielsen ratings ever at the time, as well as the BBC's Top of the Pops in the UK.

"Black or White" won the inaugural Billboard No. 1 World Single award. In 2003, Q named "Black or White" the 84th best song of all time.

== Songwriting and recording ==
"Black or White" was written and recorded over 18 months starting in early 1989. Michael Jackson hired producer Bill Bottrell to help him craft a new sound, one that would shift his style away from his earlier work with Quincy Jones. Bottrell had already worked with Jackson on Victory (1984) and Bad (1987), the latter collaboration performed at Hayvenhurst, the Jackson family's estate in Encino, California. Jackson invited Bottrell to join him in producing and composing songs at Ocean Way Studios in Los Angeles in late 1988, but none of the material from several weeks of sessions there made it to the album. In early 1989, the project was moved to Westlake Audio in West Hollywood, and one of the first things Jackson did was to hum the main riff of "Black or White" to Bottrell, who interpreted the tune on guitar, using a Kramer American Series electric guitar plugged into a Mesa Boogie amplifier, miked with a Beyerdynamic M 160. Jackson also suggested the song's rhythm with his voice, and Bottrell programmed this rhythm into an E-mu Systems drum machine. Bottrell augmented the pattern with samples from an Emulator III. His Atari computer ran a MIDI editing program by Hybrid Arts; Bottrell and Brad Buxer used the program to tweak the percussion timings to give more of a swing feel. Jackson recorded his main and backing vocals into a Neumann U47 microphone. Bottrell said that throughout the next 18 months of changes to the song, Jackson's initial scratch vocal was left in place, and it appears on the final version.

After two days of work, the song had vocals, drum sounds, and electric guitar. Bottrell added an acoustic guitar part using a Gibson LG-2 built in the 1940s, a robust model with a big country sound reminiscent of Gene Vincent's classic rockabilly style. Jackson became busy working on other projects, and "Black or White" languished for a few months. The song was picked up again when Bottrell's part of the album project moved to Record One in Sherman Oaks. Bottrell and Jackson felt that the song had two big gaps in the middle, and they determined to fill them. Jackson wanted a heavy metal guitar to fill one of the gaps, so he sang the part he wanted, including chord arpeggiations, to session player Tim Pierce who performed it on a Les Paul plugged into a Marshall stack. Michael Boddicker added the sound of a high-speed guitar by using a Roland sequencer, assisted by Kevin Gilbert. Bottrell blended two different bass sounds, primarily Bryan Loren playing a Moog keyboard bass, augmented by Terry Jackson playing an electric bass guitar. (Note: Terry Jackson was unrelated to Michael Jackson. Terry was discovered by Thomas Dolby, and played bass in 1988 on Aliens Ate My Buick, co-produced by Bottrell.) Bottrell replaced some of the E-mu default rhythm samples with live drum samples taken from an Akai machine.

For most of the recording process, Jackson left Bottrell alone to work on various ideas. Bottrell wanted a section of rapping to fill the remaining gap, and he suggested LL Cool J or Heavy D, but these proposals did not work out. Bottrell said he had been trying to get someone to write a rap verse for eight months when he was suddenly inspired to write it himself. Bottrell recorded Loren performing the rap, but Loren was not at ease in the role. Bottrell recorded it himself several times, editing one of these takes to use as a demonstration for Jackson. Upon hearing the take, Jackson wanted it for the final version. Bottrell pleaded again that they should get a "real rapper", but Jackson insisted on Bottrell's take.

The final polishing of the song involved Bottrell filling a keyboard with various sampled electric guitar notes, and bringing his friend Jasun Martz to play it, taking advantage of Martz's fresh ears and rock sensibility. For the final mix, Bottrell was frustrated by the Solid State Logic (SSL) mixer at Larrabee Sound Studios, which sounded good on the heavy metal guitar, but made the classic guitars seem "too cold and clinical". He ended up using the Neve mixer at Record One to mix the majority of the song, and the SSL for the rap and heavy metal sections. Original tracks were recorded on two Studer 24-track 2-inch analog tape machines, and a compilation of these was laid down on a Mitsubishi ProDigi 32-track digital audio tape deck.

== Composition ==
The pop rock song has elements of dance, rap and hard rock music such as Bottrell's guitars and Jackson's vocal style.

The song's main guitar riff, originally played by Bottrell, is often incorrectly attributed to Guns N' Roses guitarist Slash. Slash's guitar playing is actually heard in the skit that precedes the album version of the song, and he did play the main riff during several live performances of the song (plus several other songs), including at Jackson's appearance during the 1991 MTV 10th Anniversary show. The two teamed up for an energized performance of “Black or White”, after which Slash destroyed his guitar by throwing it into the dashboard of a prop car on stage, complete with explosives and fireworks.

== Release ==
=== Promotion ===
"Black or White" was picked as the first single from the Dangerous album. It began to be promoted on radio stations the first week of November 1991 in New York and Los Angeles. "Black or White" was officially released on November 4, 1991, in Australia and November 11 in the United Kingdom.

=== Critical reception ===
Professional ratings
Review scores
Source	Rating
AllMusic	3/5 stars

Reviews of the song were generally favorable. In a retrospective review, Chris Lacy from Albumism stated that it "merges classic rock with soulful crooning in a call for racial unity." Stephen Thomas Erlewine of AllMusic highlighted the song. Upon release, Larry Flick from Billboard magazine described it as a "surprisingly sparse, but instantly gratifying pop/rocker that reveals his grittiest and most affecting performance in years." He noted further that the guitar appearance by Slash and rap cameo by Bottrell is "purely incidental". Clark and DeVaney from Cashbox stated, "The unmistakeable voice and style are street-hip and slick, with a catchy melody and some untraditional acoustic guitar work. There is just a hint of both George Michael and Prince in the production." David Browne from Entertainment Weekly praised the song, adding, "He still knows how to fashion a hook that will take up permanent residence in your brain (away from its video, Black or White is spare and effortless)." Alan Jones from Music Week named it Pick of the Week, commenting, "A bit of patchwork quilt, and something of a disappointment on first hearing, but ultimately it reveals itself as a killer, adding up to far more than sum of its parts. This will go all the way." A reviewer from People magazine stated that "the simple, spry rock riffs" that power the song is "surprisingly effective". In his Dangerous review, Rolling Stone's Alan Light compared Slash's guitar on the album unfavourably to the guitar in "Beat It": "Neither this slow-burn solo [in 'Give In to Me'] nor the Stones-derived riff on 'Black or White' offers the catharsis of Eddie Van Halen's blazing break on 'Beat It'". Ted Shaw from The Windsor Star felt the song "is quite remarkable, a nearly perfect pop confection", adding, "It is the best thing Jackson has produced since Thriller. The Pazz & Jop critics' poll ranked "Black or White" at number 19. In 1992, Larry Flick commented on the remixes of the song, "Thanks to deft postproduction by David Cole and Robert Clivillés, the cut kicks a potent groove that nicely complements the original tune's kinetic pop/rock nature."

=== Commercial performance ===
To prepare the audience for the special occasion of the televised premiere of the "Black or White" video, Epic Records released the song (without the accompanying images) to radio stations just two days in advance. In a 24-hour period, "Black or White", described by the record company as "a rock 'n' roll dance song about racial harmony", had been added to the playlists of 96 percent of 237 of the United States' Top 40 radio stations.

"Black or White" entered the US Billboard Hot 100 at number 35. A week later it shot up to number three, and in its third week, December 7, 1991, it ascended to number one, making it the fastest chart topper since the Beatles' "Get Back", which also won the Hot 100 in just three weeks in 1969. It closed the year at number one and remained at the top of the singles chart into 1992 for a total of seven weeks, making Jackson the first artist to have number one popular hits in the 1970s, 1980s, and 1990s. The single also topped the US Cash Box Top 100. In the UK, it became the first single by an American to go into the singles chart at number one since 1960, when "It's Now or Never" by Elvis Presley did in the same manner. Around the world, "Black or White" hit number one in 20 countries, including the US, the UK, Canada, Mexico, Cuba, Turkey, Zimbabwe, Australia, New Zealand, Belgium, Denmark, Finland, France, Ireland, Italy, Norway, Spain, Sweden, Switzerland and the Eurochart Hot 100, number two in Germany and Austria and number three in the Netherlands. Previously, "Billie Jean" and "I Just Can't Stop Loving You" had each been number one in nine countries. The single was certified platinum in the US, selling over one million copies and becoming the second-best-selling single of the year. As of August 2018, the song has further been certified as two-time platinum for digital sales.

== Remixes ==
The Clivillés & Cole remixes for "Black or White", released as a promotional single in 1992, also charted on many European countries. In the UK, it reached number 14, and in Ireland, number 11. The promotional single also peaked at number 18 in Australia. Despite the favorable European response to this remix, it was never included on a Michael Jackson album or compilation, except on the third disc of the French & UK versions of Jackson's greatest hits album King of Pop.

== Music video ==
The accompanying music video for "Black or White" was directed by American director John Landis, who previously directed the "Thriller" music video (1983). It was filmed from late September to early October 1991. It was choreographed by Jackson and Vincent Paterson. It contains a Dolby Surround sound mix.

Along with Jackson, the video features Macaulay Culkin, Tess Harper, and George Wendt pictured as a family unit in the opening scene, which the Los Angeles Times criticized as "almost exactly a replay" of the 1984 Twisted Sister video for "We're Not Gonna Take It". The dance scene with the Native Americans shown in the video was filmed at Vasquez Rocks Natural Area Park in Agua Dulce, California. The Native American dancers were organized by Jackson's schoolfriend Joanelle Romero, founder of the Red Nation International Film Festival, featuring her daughter Sage as child dancer. The Native American dancers used their own traditional wardrobe and became the first Native Americans in a non–Native American music video. The production enabled Romero to become an established producer. The scene where Jackson and a dancer appear on the freeway was filmed at 11779 Sheldon Street in Sun Valley, Los Angeles. The visual effects used to morph faces into one another had previously been used only in films such as Willow and Terminator 2: Judgment Day. The morphing visual effects were created by Pacific Data Images.

A comparison between the two versions of Jackson's "Black or White" music video: the original version and the CGI-altered racist graffiti version.

The video premiered simultaneously in 27 countries, and it was circulated to news media that it had been seen by over 500 million people. It premiered on MTV, BET, VH1, and Fox (giving them their highest Nielsen ratings ever at the time) as well as the BBC's Top of the Pops in the UK on November 14, 1991.

=== Synopsis ===
The video begins with a boy (Culkin) dancing to rock music in his bedroom. His father (Wendt) yells at him to turn it off and go to bed. The boy retaliates by playing an electric guitar loudly enough to fire his father into space, after which he lands in Africa.

Jackson performs "Black or White" with dancers from different cultures, including African Zulu hunters, traditional Thai dancers, Plains Native Americans, Sri Lankan Tamil Odissi dancer Yamuna Sangarasivam, and Hopak dancers. Jackson walks defiantly through visual collages of fire (declaring "I ain't scared of no sheets; I ain't scared of nobody"), referring to KKK torch ceremonies. Culkin and other children (including Jackson's niece Brandi; Wade Robson; and Mark Pugh and David Shelton of Another Bad Creation) perform the rap sequence. The group states, "I'm not gonna spend my life being a color." Jackson performs atop the Statue of Liberty, surrounded by other world landmarks. At the end of the video, people of different ethnicities and nationalities—including a 17-year-old Tyra Banks—dance and morph into one another.

In the extended version of the music video, after the song, a black panther walks out of the studio into an urban street and transforms into Jackson, who dances furiously, similar to the 1990 LA Gear commercial. He destroys a glass beer bottle, a building window, and a parked car. He tears off his shirt and screams with grand drama as the neon sign of a hotel shoots sparks and then falls. After his damage and rampage, he re-emerges as a panther. Finally, Bart Simpson from The Simpsons jams to the song while watching it on the TV. Homer yells at him to "Turn off that noise!" Bart replies, "Chill out, Homeboy." Then, Homer angrily turns the TV off. The static then cuts to a close-up of Jackson with the tagline "Prejudice is ignorance".

=== Controversy and censorship ===
Controversy was generated concerning the last four minutes of the original music video. A black panther walks out of the studio and then morphs into Jackson. Then he walks outside to perform some of his most physically slick dance moves, in a similar way to "Billie Jean". This part contained sexually suggestive scenes when Jackson starts to grab his crotch, and then zips his pants up. In the original version, Jackson is seen smashing windows, destroying a car with his arm and a crowbar, destroying windows with a steering wheel and a trash can, and causing an inn (called the "Royal Arms Hotel") to explode.

Jackson was sharply criticized for the final scene, especially by Entertainment Weekly which ran a featured article titled "Michael Jackson's Video Nightmare". Concerns over its content had preceded its release: in the United Kingdom, around thirty seconds of the sequence were edited out of the video for its BBC premiere. Jackson asked his fans for forgiveness, saying that the violent and suggestive behavior had been a dance-style interpretation of the animalistic instincts of a panther. Jackson ordered the removal of the video's final scenes from subsequent broadcasts.

In 1993, Jackson released Dangerous: The Short Films, which included the video with a digitally altered version of the final scenes, with the glass windows smashed now marred with racist and anti-Semitic graffiti: the car windows display offensive messages with racial epithets such as "Nigger Go Home" (styled as NI66eR 6O HOMe), "No More Wetbacks", "Hitler Lives", and a storefront door is spray-painted with "KKK Rules". These alterations gave new reasoning for Jackson's destruction of property. In 1995, the DVD copies of Jackson's video collection Video Greatest Hits – HIStory included the version of the "Black and White" video with the racist graffiti, while the VHS and LaserDisc copies included the version without the racist graffiti.

== Track listings ==
- 7-inch (UK)

Side one

1. "Black or White" (single version) – 3:22

Side two

1. "Black or White" (instrumental) – 3:22
- 12-inch (UK)

Side one

1. "Black or White" – 3:22
2. "Bad" – 4:04

Side two

1. "Black or White" (instrumental) – 3:22
2. "Thriller" – 5:57
- 12-inch (The Clivillés & Cole Remixes) (UK)

Side one

1. "Black or White" (The Clivillés & Cole house / club mix) – 7:36
2. "Black or White" (The Clivillés & Cole house / dub mix) – 6:34

Side two

1. "Black or White" (The Underground club mix) – 7:29
2. "Black or White" (house with guitar radio mix) – 3:53
3. "Black or White" (tribal beats) – 3:38
- Limited edition 12-inch (US)

Side one

1. "Black or White" (The Clivilles & Cole house/club mix) – 7:33
2. "Black or White" (The Clivilles & Cole house/dub mix) – 6:27

Side two

1. "Black or White" (house with guitar radio mix) – 3:53
2. "Black or White" (single version) – 3:22
3. "Black or White" (instrumental) – 3:22
4. "Black or White" (tribal beats) – 3:34
- CD (UK)
1. "Black or White" (single version) – 3:22
2. "Black or White" (instrumental) – 3:22
3. "Smooth Criminal" – 4:16
- CD (The Clivillés & Cole Remixes) (UK)
1. "Black or White" (The Clivillés & Cole house / club mix) – 7:36
2. "Black or White" (The Clivillés & Cole house / dub mix) – 6:34
3. "Black or White" (The Underground club mix) – 7:29
4. "Black or White" (House with guitar radio mix) – 3:53
5. "Black or White" (tribal beats) – 3:38
- Promo VHS (UK) (PAL)
1. "Black or White" (domestic version) (music video) – 11:00

Visionary: The Video Singles

- CD side
1. "Black or White" (single version) – 3:22
2. "Black or White" (Clivillés & Cole house guitar radio mix) – 3:53
- DVD side
1. "Black or White" (music video) – 11:00
2. "Black or White" (single version) – 3:22
3. "Black or White" (Clivillés & Cole house guitar radio mix) – 3:53

== Cultural impact ==
In 1991, "Weird Al" Yankovic recorded a parody of "Black or White" titled "Snack All Night", which was never released. Although Jackson was a long-time supporter of Yankovic's work and had approved past parodies, he told Yankovic that he was reluctant to approve a parody of "Black or White" because of the message of the song. Yankovic believes that Jackson's rejection of the parody was ultimately for the best, because he was unsatisfied with the quality of the song and its scrapping left room on his next album for "Smells Like Nirvana", one of his biggest hits. As with other rejected parodies, Yankovic has performed "Snack All Night" during his concerts.

The music video, particularly the panther segment, has been referenced or parodied by television shows and artists, notably by Saturday Night Live (where Jackson was portrayed by Chris Rock) and In Living Color (whereas Jackson was portrayed by Tommy Davidson). Rock joked that he was angry because Jackson had smashed his car. In 1991, English rock band Genesis parodied the "Black or White" video during the ending of their video for "I Can't Dance", in which member Phil Collins imitates Jackson's "panther" fit in front of a stark white background. In 2012, the television show Glee covered the song in the episode "Michael", it features primary voices from Kevin McHale, Lea Michele, Chris Colfer, Amber Riley and Naya Rivera, and backing vocals from the rest of the cast. Jenna Ushkowitz and Darren Criss are not featured in the song or the performance. This cover debuted and peaked at number 64 on the Billboard Hot 100, number 42 at Billboard Digital Songs, and number 69 at Billboard Canadian Hot 100 chart at the week of February 18, 2012.

== Personnel ==
- Michael Jackson – vocals, composition, lyrics, production
- Bill Bottrell – rap vocals and lyrics, engineering, mixing, production, electric and acoustic guitars, drum programming, keyboard programming
- Brad Buxer – drum programming, keyboards
- Bryan Loren – Moog bass
- Terry Jackson – electric bass guitar
- Jasun Martz – keyboards
- Tim Pierce – electric guitar
- Michael Boddicker, Kevin Gilbert – speed sequencer
- Teddy Riley – drum programming (cowbell)
- Slash – guitar, in the opening skit of the music video only

== Charts ==
=== Weekly charts ===
Weekly chart performance
Chart (1991–1992)	Peak position
Australia (ARIA)	1
Austria (Ö3 Austria Top 40)	2
Belgium (Ultratop 50 Flanders)	1
Canada Retail Singles (The Record)	1
Canada Contemporary Hit Radio (The Record)	1
Canada Top Singles (RPM)	1
Canada Adult Contemporary (RPM)	3
Canada Dance/Urban (RPM)	1
Cuba (Cuban Singles Chart)	1
Denmark (Tracklisten)	1
Ecuador (UPI)	7
Europe (Eurochart Hot 100)	1
Europe (European Dance Radio)	1
Europe (European Hit Radio)	1
Finland (Suomen virallinen singlelista)	1
Finland Radio (Suomen virallinen radiosoittolista)	2
France (SNEP)	1
Germany (Official German Charts)	2
Greece (IFPI)	1
Ireland (IRMA)	1
Italy (Musica e dischi)	1
Luxembourg (Radio Luxembourg)	1
Mexico (Mexican Airplay)	1
Netherlands (Dutch Top 40)	3
Netherlands (Single Top 100)	2
New Zealand (Recorded Music NZ)	1
Norway (VG-lista)	1
Peru (UPI)	5
Portugal (AFP)	3
Spain (AFYVE)	1
Sweden (Sverigetopplistan)	1
Switzerland (Schweizer Hitparade)	1
Turkey (Turkish Singles Chart)	1
UK Singles (Official Charts)	1
UK Airplay (Music Week)	1
UK Dance (Music Week)	5
UK Club Chart (Music Week)	7
Uruguay (UPI)	2
US Billboard Hot 100	1
US Adult Contemporary (Billboard)	23
US Dance Club Songs (Billboard)	2
US Dance Singles Sales (Billboard)	1
US Hot R&B/Hip-Hop Songs (Billboard)	3
US Cash Box Top 100	1

Weekly chart performance
Chart (2006)	Peak position
France (SNEP)	64
Ireland (IRMA)	22
Italy (FIMI)	7
Netherlands (Single Top 100)	24
Spain (Promusicae)	2
UK Singles (OCC)	18

Weekly chart performance
Chart (2009)	Peak position
Australia (ARIA)	6
Austria (Ö3 Austria Top 40)	17
Canada Digital Song Sales (Billboard)	8
Denmark (Tracklisten)	22
Europe (European Hot 100)	25
France (SNEP)	9
Italy (FIMI)	7
Netherlands (Single Top 100)	21
New Zealand (Recorded Music NZ)	16
Norway (VG-lista)	18
Spain (Promusicae)	22
Sweden (Sverigetopplistan)	11
Switzerland (Schweizer Hitparade)	7
UK Singles (OCC)	25
US Digital Song Sales (Billboard)	13

Weekly chart performance
Chart (2011–2026)	Peak position
Croatia International Airplay (Top lista)	68
Hungary (MAHASZ)	6
Poland Airplay (ZPAV)	64

=== Year-end charts ===
1991 year-end chart performance for "Black or White"
Chart (1991)	Position
Australia (ARIA)	34
Italy (Musica e dischi)	44
Netherlands (Dutch Top 40)	89
Netherlands (Single Top 100)	68
New Zealand (RIANZ)	19
Sweden (Topplistan)	17
UK Singles (OCC)	13

1992 year-end chart performance for "Black or White"
Chart (1992)	Position
Australia (ARIA)	83
Austria (Ö3 Austria Top 40)	23
Belgium (Ultratop)	58
Brazil (Crowley)	16
Europe (European Hot 100 Singles)	8
Germany (Media Control)	12
Sweden (Topplistan)	24
Switzerland (Schweizer Hitparade)	14
US Billboard Hot 100	14
US Dance Club Play (Billboard)	36
US Hot R&B Singles (Billboard)	62
US Maxi-Singles Sales (Billboard)	28
US Cash Box Top 100	29

=== Decade-end charts ===
Decade-end chart performance for "Black or White"
Chart (1990–1999)	Position
Belgium (Ultratop Flanders)	77
Canada (Nielsen SoundScan)	22
US Billboard Hot 100	39

== Certifications ==
Certifications for "Black or White"
Region	Certification	Certified units/sales
Australia (ARIA)	2× Platinum	140,000^{^}
Canada (Music Canada)	3× Platinum	240,000^{‡}
Denmark (IFPI Danmark)	Platinum	90,000^{‡}
France (SNEP)	Silver	125,000^{*}
Germany (BVMI)	Gold	250,000^{^}
Italy (FIMI)	Gold	35,000^{‡}
Japan (RIAJ) Full-length ringtone	Gold	100,000^{*}
New Zealand (RMNZ)	2× Platinum	60,000^{‡}
Spain (Promusicae)	Gold	30,000^{‡}
United Kingdom (BPI) Physical	Silver	530,000
United Kingdom (BPI) Digital	Platinum	600,000^{‡}
United States (RIAA)	3× Platinum	3,000,000^{‡}
^{*} Sales figures based on certification alone.^{^} Shipments figures based on certification alone.^{‡} Sales+streaming figures based on certification alone.

== Release history ==
Region	Version	Date	Format(s)	Label(s)	Ref.
Australia	Original	November 4, 1991	CD; cassette	Epic	
United Kingdom	Original	November 11, 1991	7-inch vinyl; 12-inch vinyl; CD; cassette	Epic	
United States	Original	November 12, 1991	Radio	Epic	
Japan	Original	November 21, 1991	Mini-CD	Epic	
United Kingdom	Clivillés & Cole remixes	January 6, 1992	12-inch vinyl; CD	Epic	
Australia	Clivillés & Cole remixes	January 20, 1992	12-inch vinyl; CD; cassette	Epic	
Japan	Clivillés & Cole remixes	March 25, 1992	CD	Epic	
