= Moonwalk (book) =

1988 autobiography by Michael Jackson

- Author: Michael Jackson
- Language: English
- Subject: Michael Jackson
- Genre: Autobiography
- Publisher: Doubleday
- Publication date: February 1, 1988
- Publication place: United States
- Pages: 320
- ISBN: 0-385-24712-5
- OCLC: 17411901
- Dewey Decimal: 784.5/4/00924 B 19
- LC Class: ML420.J175 A3 1988
- Followed by: Dancing the Dream

Moonwalk is a 1988 autobiography by American singer Michael Jackson. It was first published by Doubleday on February 1, 1988, five months after the release of Jackson's album Bad in 1987, and was named after Jackson's signature dance move, the moonwalk. The book was edited and contains a foreword by Jacqueline Kennedy Onassis, who was the first lady of the United States from 1961 to 1963.

Moonwalk reached number one on the New York Times Best Seller list and has sold more than 1 million copies worldwide. The book was reissued by Doubleday in October 2009, following Jackson's death in June of that year.

== Production ==
Kennedy Onassis, who was an editor at Doubleday, secured the book deal and paid Jackson an advance-fee of $300,000. As part of the deal, Jackson wanted Kennedy Onassis to write a foreword, which she initially refused, as she did not want her name on any books, but later agreed to write three paragraphs. She also edited the book. The first manuscript of the book was written by Robert Hilburn, and was refused by Doubleday because it lacked "juicy details". A second manuscript was written by Stephen Davis, which Jackson drastically edited. Jackson finally resolved to write the book himself, with help from Shaye Areheart.

Due to Jackson's globally high profile, Moonwalk's publication-process was secretive. Relatives of Doubleday employees were hired as couriers in order to deliver portions of the book from the company's head office in Manhattan to the printing plant in Fairfield, Pennsylvania. At the printing plant, the book was given the code name "Neil Armstrong", after the first "moonwalker".

== Narrative ==
Dedicated to Fred Astaire, the book discusses Jackson's show-business friends, his girlfriends, his rise to fame, his appearance, and his thoughts on plastic surgery. Jackson stated that up to that point, he had two rhinoplasties and the surgical creation of a cleft in his chin. He attributed the change in the structure of his face to puberty, weight loss, a strict vegetarian diet, a change in hair style and stage lighting.

In the book, Jackson tells of the beatings he received from his father, Joseph. He wrote that while rehearsing with the Jackson 5 any mistake that he or his siblings made prompted Joseph to beat them; he states that Joseph was "real strict" and "something of a mystery". In September 1988, Jackson apologized to his father for some of the book's content. He explained that he had not written it wholly himself and that the critical portions were produced by another person. The book also covers Jackson's resentment of the press; he asks, "What happened to truth? Did it go out of style?"

Despite being Jackson's memoir, Kennedy Onassis and Stephen Davis were acknowledged to have also provided input to Moonwalk. In 2010, The Wall Street Journal described Moonwalk as being Kennedy Onassis' "most successful book", due to her prominent role in supervising its writing for Doubleday, in addition to the prominence she had over managing its input.

== Reception ==
Moonwalk debuted at number one on both the British newspaper The Times' and the Los Angeles Times' bestseller lists. Reaching number two in its first week on The New York Times Best Seller list, Moonwalk reached number one the following week. Within a few months of its release, Moonwalk had sold 450,000 copies in fourteen countries. By the end of its run, the English-language edition of Moonwalk had sold 1,000,000 copies.

Ken Tucker, of The New York Times, stated that if the book had been written by anyone else, it would be dismissed as "an assiduously unrevealing, frequently tedious document." However, he adds that "these are precisely the qualities that make it fascinating".

== Re-release ==
Moonwalk was re-released on October 13, 2009, as a result of Jackson's death, with a new foreword by Motown founder Berry Gordy and an afterword by Shaye Areheart.
