= Who Is It (Michael Jackson song) =

1992 single by Michael Jackson

Single by Michael Jackson

from the album Dangerous
- Released: July 13, 1992
- Recorded: 1989–1990
- Genre: New jack swing; pop
- Length: 6:35 (album version); 3:59 (7-inch edit); 4:10 (7-inch edit w/ intro)
- Label: Epic
- Songwriter: Michael Jackson
- Producers: Michael Jackson; Bill Bottrell

Michael Jackson singles chronology
"Jam" (1992)	"Who Is It" (1992)	"Heal the World" (1992)

Music video
- "Who Is It" on YouTube

Audio sample
- "Who Is It": file; help

"Who Is It" is a song by the American singer and songwriter Michael Jackson. It was released by Epic Records in the United Kingdom on July 13, 1992, as the fourth single from Jackson's eighth album, Dangerous (1991). In the United States, it was released as the album's sixth single on March 29, 1993. The song was written and composed by Jackson, and produced by Jackson and Bill Bottrell. The song's lyrics pertain to despair over being left by someone you love; some critics noted a comparison to the lyrics of the song to Jackson's single "Billie Jean" from the album Thriller. As part of the promotion for the song, two music videos were released in 1992. The song was not performed by Jackson on any of his tours. He did, however, perform a small segment of the song in his interview with Oprah Winfrey in early 1993.

== Background and composition ==
"Who Is It" was recorded by Michael Jackson for his eighth studio album, Dangerous. Jackson wrote and composed the track, in the key of D minor, and produced it with Bill Bottrell. It was released as the fifth single from Dangerous on July 13, 1992, in the UK by Jackson's record label, Epic Records. The lyrics of the song tell of a man who is left in despair when his lover suddenly leaves him. He learns that she was unfaithful to him and wants to know with whom she cheated.

== Reception ==
=== Critical reception ===
Professional ratings
Review scores
Source	Rating
AllMusic	2.5/5 stars

Several music critics compared "Who Is It" to Jackson's 1983 single "Billie Jean". Chris Lacy from Albumism described the song as a "haunting masterpiece" that "finds Jackson teeming with rage and regret when his lover leaves him unexpectedly." Larry Flick from Billboard magazine called it a "stellar jam", adding that "minor-key synths and rigid rhythms underscore a white-knuckled vocal and a hook reminiscent of 'Billie Jean'." Chris Willman of the Los Angeles Times claimed that it "recaptures some of the slinky, insinuating feel of 'Billie Jean'." Jon Pareles, a writer for The New York Times, said the song is an "imitation" of "Billie Jean". Alan Light of Rolling Stone noted that unlike his previous efforts, it is about betrayal. Jonathan Bernstein, a writer for Spin, wrote that "Who Is It" was "close skin to 'Billie Jean'."

=== Commercial reception ===
"Who Is It" was commercially successful worldwide, generally peaking within the top 30 positions on national music charts. The song peaked at number 14 on the United States' Billboard Hot 100 chart, while peaking at number six on Billboard Hot R&B/Hip-Hop Songs, as well as topping the Billboard Hot Dance Club Play. Internationally, "Who Is It" reached the top 20 in several countries. The song debuted on the United Kingdom music chart at number 12 on July 25, 1992, and the following week reached its peak position, number 10. It remained within the top 100 positions for seven consecutive weeks from July to September 1992. In France, the track peaked at number eight on August 29. "Who Is It" reached its lowest peak position at number 34 in Australia.

In Austria, the track debuted at its peak position, number five; the song remained within the top 30 chart positions from August to October. "Who Is It" debuted in Switzerland on August 2, at number 40, and peaked at number 14 two weeks later. The song debuted at number 94 in the Netherlands, and the following week moved up 60 positions, eventually peaking at number 13. In Sweden, the track entered the country's music chart at its peak position, number 24 and, after four weeks, fell out of the top 50. In Norway, the track debuted at its peak position, number 10 on the 30th week of 1992; the song charted at its peak position for two weeks before falling off the chart. The song also peaked at number 16 in New Zealand. After Jackson's death in June 2009, his music experienced a surge in popularity. "Who Is It" re-entered the Switzerland music charts for the first time in over 17 years, hitting number 49 on July 12, 2009.

== Music video ==
Directed by David Fincher, the accompanying music video for "Who Is It" was released in 1992. The music video was filmed in Los Angeles, California and the helicopter scene in the video was filmed at the Neverland Ranch.

It begins with Jackson in what seems to be a hotel, singing about his girlfriend portrayed by English model Yasmin Le Bon. He is distressed because he found a silver card with the name "Alex" on it. It implies that his girlfriend is cheating on him with someone else. As the story in the video unfolds, the girl takes on different identities (i.e. Eve, Diana, etc.) for her job as a high class call girl. "Alex" (which is also a girl's name) just happens to be one of them. The video alternates scenes from where Jackson is singing about his pain, to where the girl is being changed into her different identities and taking care of her jobs (mostly meeting with other men and even some women, and sleeping with them). Towards the end of the video, Jackson has packed up his bags to leave town, because of his distress. A helicopter comes to pick him up from his house. The girl comes to Jackson's house and she asks his assistant (who knows the situation and aided Jackson in his departure) to let her in. It is likely she quit the job for him and wants to stay. The assistant shakes his head, implying that he left. When she asks why, he drops a flutter of silver nameplates (including the one that said "Alex") from a slot in the door. After that scene, Jackson is seen sleeping and smoke floats out the side of the screen. Having lost her love and without any alternative, the girl turns to her profession as a call girl again. Her employer (portrayed by actress Lois Chiles) slaps her in the face and the video ends as the girl is seen being prepared for a new identity.

This version did not initially air in the USA but was included on the video albums: Dangerous: The Short Films and Michael Jackson's Vision.

Another version of the video features footage from past music videos and live performances. This is the version that first aired in the USA.

== Track listings ==
- CD-maxi (658179 2)
1. "Who Is It" (7-inch edit with intro) – 4:10
2. "Who Is It" (The Most Patient Mix) – 7:44
3. "Who Is It" (IHS Mix) – 7:58
4. "Who Is It" (P-Man Dub) – 7:31
5. "Don't Stop 'Til You Get Enough" (Roger's Underground Solution Mix) – 6:22
- 7-inch single (658179 7)
1. "Who Is It" (7-inch edit with intro) – 4:10
2. "Rock with You" (Masters at Work Remix) – 5:29
- The Remixes – 12-inch maxi (658179 6)
1. "Who Is It" (Patience Mix) – 7:44
2. "Who Is It" (The Most Patient Mix) – 7:44
3. "Who Is It" (IHS Mix) – 7:58
4. "Who Is It" (P-Man Dub) – 7:31
- CD single (658179 5)
1. "Who Is It" (The Most Patient Mix) – 7:44
2. "Who Is It" (IHS Mix) – 7:58
3. "Don't Stop 'Til You Get Enough" (Roger's Underground Club Solution) – 6:22
- The Remixes – CD-maxi (ESCA 5652)
1. "Who Is It" (Patience Mix) – 7:44
2. "Who Is It" (The Most Patient Mix) – 7:44
3. "Who Is It" (IHS Mix) – 7:58
4. "Who Is It" (P-Man Dub) – 7:31
5. "Don't Stop 'Til You Get Enough" (Roger's Underground Club Solution) – 6:22
- CD-maxi (49K 74420)
1. "Who Is It" (The Oprah Winfrey Special Intro) – 4:00
2. "Who Is It" (Patience Edit) – 4:01
3. "Who Is It" (House 7-inch) – 3:55
4. "Who Is It" (Brothers in Rhythm House Mix) – 7:13
5. "Beat It" (Moby's Sub Mix) – 6:11
- 12-inch maxi (49 74420)
1. "Who Is It" (Brothers in Rhythm House Mix) – 7:11
2. "Who Is It" (Tribal Version) – 7:39
3. "Who Is It" (Brothers Cool Dub) – 5:47
4. "Who Is It" (Lakeside Dub) – 7:36
5. "Beat It" (Moby's Sub Mix) – 6:18

== Personnel ==
- Written, composed, arrangement, soprano voice, beatboxing, solo and background vocals by Michael Jackson
- Produced by Michael Jackson and Bill Bottrell
- Recorded, mixed and synthesizer by Bill Bottrell
- Drums by Bryan Loren and Bill Bottrell
- Bass by Louis Johnson
- Keyboard arrangements by Brad Buxer and David Paich
- Keyboard performance and programming: Brad Buxer, Michael Boddicker, David Paich, Steve Porcaro and Jai Winding
- String arrangement by George del Barrio
- Concertmaster: Endre Grant
- Solo cello: Larry Corbett

== Charts ==
=== Weekly charts ===
Weekly chart performance
Chart (1992–1993)	Peak position
Australia (ARIA)	34
Austria (Ö3 Austria Top 40)	5
Belgium (Ultratop 50 Flanders)	9
Canada Retail Singles (The Record)	20
Canada Contemporary Hit Radio (The Record)	4
Canada Top Singles (RPM)	6
Canada Dance/Urban (RPM)	5
Europe (Eurochart Hot 100)	8
Europe (European Dance Radio)	5
Europe (European Hit Radio)	3
Finland (Suomen virallinen lista)	11
France (SNEP)	8
Germany (GfK)	9
Greece (Pop + Rock)	7
Ireland (IRMA)	6
Italy (Musica e dischi)	17
Netherlands (Dutch Top 40)	15
Netherlands (Single Top 100)	13
New Zealand (Recorded Music NZ)	16
Norway (VG-lista)	10
Spain (AFYVE)	19
Sweden (Sverigetopplistan)	24
Switzerland (Schweizer Hitparade)	14
UK Singles (Official Charts)	10
UK Airplay (Music Week)	3
UK Dance (Music Week)	16
UK Club Chart (Music Week)	55
US Billboard Hot 100	14
US Dance Club Songs (Billboard)	1
US Dance Singles Sales (Billboard)	1
US Hot R&B/Hip-Hop Songs (Billboard)	6
US Pop Airplay (Billboard)	6
US Rhythmic Airplay (Billboard)	21
US Cash Box Top 100	5

2009 weekly chart performance
Chart (2009)	Peak position
Switzerland (Schweizer Hitparade)	49

=== Year-end charts ===
1992 year-end chart performance
Chart (1992)	Position
Belgium (Ultratop 50 Flanders)	95
Europe (Eurochart Hot 100)	48
Europe (European Hit Radio)	13
Germany (Media Control)	49
UK Airplay (Music Week)	63

1993 year-end chart performance
Chart (1993)	Position
Canada Top Singles (RPM)	64
US Dance Club Play (Billboard)	50
US Hot R&B Singles (Billboard)	88
US Maxi-Singles Sales (Billboard)	40

== Release history ==
Release dates and formats
Region	Date	Format(s)	Label(s)	Ref.
United Kingdom	July 13, 1992	7-inch vinyl; 12-inch vinyl; CD; cassette	Epic	
Japan	August 22, 1992	Mini-CD	Epic	
Australia	September 7, 1992	CD; cassette	Epic	
Japan	October 1, 1992	CD (remixes)	Epic	
United States	March 29, 1993	12-inch vinyl; CD	Epic	

== See also ==
- List of Billboard number-one dance singles of 1993

== Bibliography ==
- Halstead, Craig (2007). Michael Jackson: For the Record. Authors OnLine. ISBN 978-0-7552-0267-6.
