= David Nordahl =

American painter

- Born: 1941 (age 84–85); Albert Lea, Minnesota
- Known for: Oil painting
- Movement: Realism, photorealism
- Spouse: Lori Peterson
- Patrons: Michael Jackson (1988–2005)

David Nordahl (born 1941) is an American painter, most notable for serving as singer Michael Jackson's personal portraitist from 1988–2005. Nordahl gained initial fame through his scrupulously researched paintings of Apache life.

== Biography ==
David Nordahl was born in Albert Lea, Minnesota in 1941. Of his early years, Nordahl stated: "I can't remember not drawing. I had an abusive, alcoholic father, and drawing is something that takes you out of the real world. I was always interested in cowboys and Indians. I sold drawings of the Lone Ranger to my classmates."

He graduated from Albert Lea High School in 1959. Besides painting portraits, Nordahl also created set pieces for theatrical productions for the Albert Lea Civic Theater in the mid-1960s. In 1964 in Minneapolis he founded Pandora Productions with Bart de Malignon, making posters and blacklight posters. He moved to Steamboat Springs, Colorado, in 1977. In Colorado, Nordahl solely focused on painting photorealistic portraits of Apache life, which lured collectors due to his painstaking detail and high quality.

=== Michael Jackson's patronage and friendship ===
Nordahl left the world of commercial art to work as Michael Jackson's private portraitist in 1988. He received a late night phone call from Jackson, who had recently seen a Nordahl painting in Steven Spielberg's office, depicting a 19th-century raid on an Apache camp by US Army troops. Initially contacting Nordahl for art lessons, Jackson quickly found a kindred spirit and friend. This led to a creative collaboration which, until 2005, yielded thousands of drawings and roughly a dozen large-scale commissions.

Nordahl and Jackson's bond was cemented not only through their mutual artistic appreciation, but through their shared experience of traumatic childhoods. "I grew up in a difficult home, and he did too," says Nordahl. "We had no playtime growing up. We're both fanatical about work". In addition to his work as portraitist, Nordahl provided designs for Jackson's amusement park in Neverland Ranch.

=== Post-Jackson career ===
Since Michael Jackson's move to Bahrain in 2005 (and later his death in 2009), Nordahl has returned to painting Apaches and other subjects. He is currently represented by Settlers West Galleries in Tucson.

== Personal life ==
Nordahl currently resides in Santa Fe, New Mexico with his wife, artist Lori Peterson. Nordahl's son, Blane David Nordahl, was arrested in August 2013 in connection with a string of thefts that focused entirely on antique silver pieces.
