= Dangerous (Michael Jackson album) =

1991 studio album

- Cover art by Mark Ryden

Studio album by Michael Jackson
- Released: November 21, 1991
- Recorded: June 1989 – October 1991
- Studios: Record One (Sherman Oaks, Los Angeles); Westlake (Los Angeles); Larrabee (North Hollywood, Los Angeles); Record Plant (Los Angeles); Ocean Way (Hollywood); Smoketree Ranch (Chatsworth, Los Angeles); Toad Hall (Pasadena, California)
- Genres: New jack swing; pop; R&B; hip-hop
- Length: 76:47
- Label: Epic
- Producers: Michael Jackson; Bill Bottrell; Bruce Swedien; Teddy Riley

Michael Jackson chronology
The Michael Jackson Mix (1987)	Dangerous (1991)	HIStory: Past, Present and Future, Book I (1995)

Singles from Dangerous
- 1. "Black or White" Released: November 4, 1991; 2. "Remember the Time" Released: January 14, 1992; 3. "In the Closet" Released: April 13, 1992; 4. "Jam" Released: June 19, 1992; 5. "Who Is It" Released: July 13, 1992; 6. "Heal the World" Released: November 9, 1992; 7. "Give In to Me" Released: February 15, 1993; 8. "Will You Be There" Released: June 28, 1993; 9. "Gone Too Soon" Released: December 1, 1993

Dangerous is the eighth studio album by the American singer Michael Jackson, released through Epic Records on November 21, 1991. It was released four years after Jackson's previous album, Bad (1987). Jackson departed from longtime collaborator Quincy Jones, instead co-producing the album with Bill Bottrell, Teddy Riley, and Bruce Swedien. The album features guest appearances from Heavy D, Princess Stéphanie of Monaco, Slash, and Wreckx-n-Effect. The album incorporates new jack swing, pop, R&B, and hip-hop. Jackson wrote or co-wrote most of the songs, centered on topics like lust, unity, social issues, and self-improvement.

Dangerous is considered an artistic change for Jackson, with a more socially conscious material and a broader range of sounds and styles, including underground sounds. It features industrial, funk, electronic, gospel, classical, and rock. Nine singles from the album premiered between November 1991 and December 1993, including one exclusively released outside North America ("Give In to Me"). In support of the album, Jackson embarked on the Dangerous World Tour, which grossed $100 million.

Dangerous was generally a critical success, with praise for its artistic leap compared to Jackson's previous albums. It debuted at number 1 on the US Billboard Top Pop Albums chart and remained there for four consecutive weeks. It also reached number 1 in 14 other countries. In 1992, it became Jackson's third consecutive album to become the year's best-selling album worldwide. "Black or White" reached number one on the Billboard Hot 100, and "Remember the Time", "In the Closet", and "Will You Be There" reached the Top 10.

Dangerous is one of the best-selling albums of all time, having sold 32 million copies worldwide, and is certified 8× platinum in the United States. It has been included in several best-album lists and received numerous awards, including Best Engineered Album, Non-Classical at the 1993 Grammy Awards and Favorite Pop/Rock Album and Favorite Soul/R&B Song (for "Remember the Time") at the 1993 American Music Awards. It has since been credited by critics as Jackson's final "classic" album and his most artistically ambitious work.

== Background ==
After the success of his seventh studio album, Bad (1987), Michael Jackson wanted more independence and control over the creative process. He separated himself from longtime producer Quincy Jones to avoid the perception that his success depended on him. Jackson began working on new tracks in 1989, with a handful of members from the B-team of Bad, including Matt Forger and Bill Bottrell. The album was conceived as a greatest hits collection, Decade, with a handful of new songs, similar to Madonna's The Immaculate Collection. Jackson received $18 million in advance.

Decade was scheduled for a late 1989 release, but was delayed several times, before another release date was set for November 1990. Jackson was preoccupied with ongoing changes in his management team while also attempting to realize his filmmaking ambitions. In June 1990, reports stated that he had collapsed while he was dancing in his home studio due to a possible panic attack, with symptoms of chest pains, dehydration and inflammation of the ribs. Soon after the incident, Decade was dropped entirely and Jackson determined that his new material constituted a full album.

== Recording ==
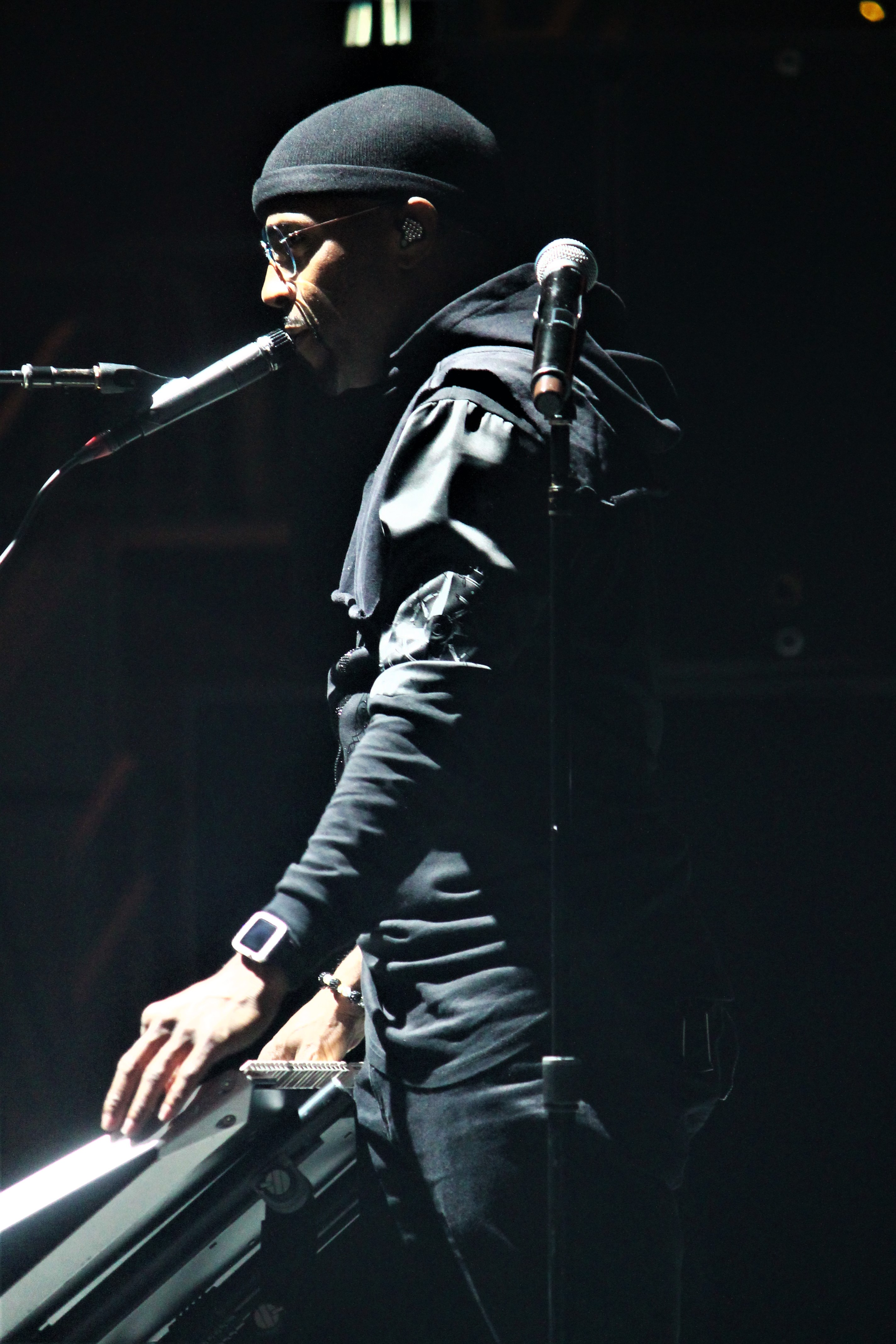
Jackson enlisted Teddy Riley, pioneer of the new jack swing genre, as one of his co-producers.

For over two years starting in June 1989, recording took place primarily at Record One in Sherman Oaks, Los Angeles, where Jackson arranged for executive control for $4,000 per day. Most work proceeded with three producers – Bill Bottrell, Bruce Swedien, and Bryan Loren – at three different studios with Jackson. Bottrell co-wrote and produced tracks such as "Give In to Me" and "Black or White", and received writing credits for "Dangerous" and production credits for "Who Is It". He had been forced out of the production of Bad by Jones, but Jackson brought him back for Dangerous, for which he was known as the "rock guy". Bottrell introduced Jackson to classically-trained keyboardist Brad Buxer, who was originally hired as a technician for his expertise in electronic equipment. Buxer recalled: "Musically speaking, we were on the same wavelength; we spoke the same language." The Jackson–Buxer partnership continued for 20 years.

For most of the rhythm-oriented tracks, Jackson worked with Loren primarily at Record One. Together, the two had recorded tracks such as "Work That Body", "She Got It", "Serious Effect", "Do Not Believe It", "Seven Digits", and "Man in Black". Loren wanted to recapture the organic R&B feeling of Jackson's album Off the Wall. American rapper LL Cool J was invited to rap on "Serious Effect" and "Truth About Youth", because Jackson wanted to add hip-hop elements to the record. LL Cool J had been critical of Jackson, but praised him after their collaboration. None of Loren's recordings made the album. Though Loren's material was strong, its sound was not what Jackson was looking for, in which was more akin to a sound as compelling and successful as Rhythm Nation (1989) by Michael's sister Janet.

Jackson discovered new jack swing, which featured a more aggressive and urban sound, after reaching out to producers Antonio "L.A." Reid and Kenny "Babyface" Edmonds. In early 1991, Jackson hired producer Teddy Riley, who had been a pioneer of the new jack swing genre. (Note: Author Joe Vogel notes Riley joined the sessions in June 1990, while author Mike Smallcombe and other sources suggest early 1991 as the actual date.) Initially recording at Record One, Riley moved to nearby Larrabee Sound Studios after a few weeks, because other producers were working at Sherman Oaks. Unlike Loren, Riley wanted Dangerous to sound different from Jackson's earlier work, and Jackson admired Riley for bringing in contemporary styles. Jackson challenged Riley to create new instrumentation without relying on stock synth and drum machine sounds. Riley further developed the tracks "Jam" and "Dangerous", and also contributed his own song ideas, such as "Remember the Time" and "In the Closet". "Dangerous" was originally recorded with Bottrell, but Jackson was not satisfied until improvements were made. Riley said that he brought Jackson's music back to its "barest forms" of R&B and funk.

In mid-1991, Jackson had finished the track listing, which includes several tracks that he recorded with Riley, such as "Remember the Time", "Dangerous", and "In the Closet". He had planned for "In the Closet" to be a duet with pop singer Madonna, but Princess Stéphanie of Monaco was featured on the track instead. The meeting with guitarist Slash took more than a year to co-ordinate and the two collaborated on "Give In to Me". Swedien recalled recording sessions lasting up to 18 hours. On one occasion, he ordered Jackson not to leave the studio until he sang the vocals for the track "Keep the Faith" all the way through: "This was scary but he did it. He didn't leave the studio until dawn."

Jackson spent $10 million to record Dangerous. Executives at Epic set a deadline for the album, wanting it released before Thanksgiving Day, November 28, 1991. For the last two months of recording, Jackson and Swedien rented hotel rooms located four minutes from Record One, so they could get back to work as soon as possible. Riley said, "When the deadline came, [Jackson] wanted to do more and more songs. ... And then when Michael saw the commercial for Dangerous, the David Lynch thing, we started working hard to get it finished." Dangerous was completed and mastered, by Bernie Grundman, on Halloween 1991.

Jackson recorded roughly 60–70 songs for Dangerous, some of which were released later, including the environmental anthem "Earth Song", which was included on Jackson's next album, HIStory: Past, Present and Future, Book I, in 1995. Three other tracks—"Superfly Sister", "Ghosts", and "Blood on the Dance Floor"—were released on the remix album Blood on the Dance Floor: HIStory in the Mix (1997). Loren helped develop "Superfly Sister", while Riley worked on "Ghosts" and "Blood on the Dance Floor". Another Riley-produced outtake, "Joy", was featured on Blackstreet's 1994's debut studio album. The track "For All Time", a romantic pop ballad that Jackson liked, but did not feel fit Dangerous, was released on the 25th anniversary edition of Thriller. "Slave to the Rhythm", originally produced by the duo of L.A. Reid and Babyface, was remixed and released on the compilation album Xscape (2014).

== Composition and lyrics ==
Dangerous is largely influenced by new jack swing and primarily spans R&B and pop. The album also features hip hop and incorporates elements of several other genres, including industrial, funk, electronic, gospel, classical and rock. In a 1992 interview with Ebony magazine, Jackson said, "I wanted to do an album like Tchaikovsky's Nutcracker Suite. So that in a thousand years from now, people would still be listening to it." Much of the album contains samples from CDs that Riley had created himself using a variety of instruments.

The album features catchy pop hooks and choruses while also introducing underground sounds to a mainstream audience. The album's tone is noted by critics as gritty and urban, with sounds including synthetic basslines, scratching, and drum machine percussion, as well as unconventional sounds like honking vehicle horns, sliding chains, swinging gates, breaking glass, and clanking metal. Throughout the album Jackson also implements beatboxing, scat singing, and finger snapping. The album is considered by Joe Vogel in PopMatters to be an artistic change for Jackson, because of its focus on socially conscious material, and a broader range of sounds and styles. The car sound effects on "She Drives Me Wild" were taken from a sample CD; this marked the first time Riley used unusual sounds in place of the drums on a song.

The album featured Jackson rapping for the first time. The inclusion of Wreckx-n-Effect and hip-hop rhythms were attempts to introduce Jackson to a younger generation of urban listeners. Riley was a pioneer of new jack swing, and he was hired by Jackson specifically for his work in the genre. Riley co-produced half the songs on the album. Swedien said of Riley, "He'd come in with a groove, we'd say it wasn't exactly right, and there would be no complaining. He'd just go back and then come back in and blow us away with something like 'Dangerous'." In recordings with Bottrell, the sounds were more diverse (e.g. "Black or White" and "Give In to Me"). The rap in "Black or White" was written and performed by Bottrell, credited under the pseudonym "L.T.B." Jackson hummed melodies and grooves before leaving the studio, while Bottrell developed on these ideas with drum machines and samplers, including an Akai S1000. Bottrell operated a Neve console and two 24-track Studer analog tape machines to draft ideas and demos. He then used a 32-track Mitsubishi machine to assemble the album.

[Recording with Jackson] is at once the most sterile and creative process I've been involved in. Everything is pieced together from samples: you use the same drum beat and chords, then later add things to make it different .... Michael hires out the studio for like ten years and shows up once a month.

— Slash, interview with Musician magazine, 1991.

The lyrics for Dangerous were more varied than those of Jackson's previous records. Opening track "Jam" features a dense, swirling Riley track, propelled by horn samples and a subtle scratch effect. Jackson had recorded a basic idea for the song on a DAT, to which he asked Riley to develop. Riley learned that Heavy D was Jackson's favorite rapper at the time, and suggested that he was brought in to contribute a rap. The ballads, "Keep the Faith" (composed by Jackson, Siedah Garrett and Glen Ballard) and the self-composed "Will You Be There" had sounds of gospel, while "Heal the World" and "Gone Too Soon" were softer pop ballads. "Gone Too Soon", written by Larry Grossman and Buz Kohan, is a tribute to Ryan White following his death due to AIDS in 1990. The album also includes songs of other personal nature, such as "She Drives Me Wild", "Remember the Time", "Can't Let Her Get Away", "Who Is It" and "Give In to Me". The title track's subject is similar to that of "Dirty Diana" with the song focusing on a seductress. Though Jackson sang about racial harmony in some of his songs with the Jacksons, "Black or White" was the first song where the lyrics were interpreted with the context of his own changing skin color. In "Why You Wanna Trip on Me", Jackson juxtaposed social ills to his own alleged eccentricities that were covered in the press at the time, asking critics and the tabloid media why they were focusing on the cult of celebrity rather than the multitude of serious problems in the world. Riley performed the guitar parts on an Ovation acoustic, and expected Jackson to have someone brought in to re-record them, but was surprised that Jackson liked what he had put down.

== Artwork ==
The album's front cover was painted by American pop surrealist artist Mark Ryden. It displays Jackson behind a gold masquerade mask with the face of a chimpanzee (which may be Jackson's pet Bubbles) atop the mask, and a dog and a bird wearing royal clothing sitting on the left and right side, respectively. The forefront depicts P. T. Barnum, the creator of the Barnum and Bailey circus. Ryden had five days to come up with ideas, and "feverishly worked that week" to produce one design per day. He was instructed to focus on Jackson's eyes, include animals and children, and "show the earth at peril". He was also told that his designs "could be scary, but should still be fun". Ryden said the cover was his most exciting project up to that point. In November 2021, the 30th anniversary of Dangerous, Ryden shared his conceptual drawings for the cover on Instagram for the first time. According to Fraser McAlpine of BBC Music, Ryden depicted Jackson as "a guarded circus artist who has seen glory and the machinery involved in making it happen".

== Release and commercial reception ==
In November 1991, days before the debut of the music video "Black or White", David Browne of Entertainment Weekly commented on the high expectations of Dangerous, due to the extended time spent on developing the album and Jackson's lucrative $65 million contract with Sony Music. The writer stated, "[T]here is more riding on the success of Dangerous than on any other album in pop history." Jackson personally hoped that the album would sell 100 million copies, a number that would twice surpass the sales of Thriller. Dangerous was released amid the 1990–1991 U.S. recession and a downturn in the recording industry, with U.S. record sales declining by approximately 11% during the first half of 1991.

Given Jackson's commercial stature and the album's release ahead of the holiday season, industry executives and retailers viewed Dangerous as a potential boost to the struggling market. Five days before the album's release, three men armed with guns robbed 30,000 copies from a Los Angeles warehouse.At the time of the release date, Epic Records shipped 4.2 million copies of "Dangerous" in the United States.

Dangerous was released on November 21, 1991, in the United Kingdom, November 25 in Japan, and November 26 in the United States. It debuted at number one on the Billboard 200 Top Albums chart on December 14, and spent an additional three weeks there. In its first week, it sold 326,500 copies, based on sales from the first five days of the tracking period. In the second week, the album sold 378,000 copies, a 16% increase from the previous week sales. In its third week, Dangerous sold 370,000 copies. At the end of 1991, the total number of sales totalled to 1,074,500 copies sold in the United States and the album was certified platinum. Dangerous opened the year 1992, dated January 4, remaining at number one with 370,000 copies sold. By January 1992, it was certified quadruple platinum by the Recording Industry Association of America (RIAA) for sales of over four million copies in the US, outpacing both Thriller and Bad in early US sales and roughly equalling the same number as the initial sales of Off the Wall.

Dangerous continued to sell strongly in 1992 and 1993 in the US. In 1993, following several personal and promotional appearances, album sales for Dangerous grew significantly. Following Jackson's performance at the inauguration of U.S. President Bill Clinton, sales increased 36% and the album jumped from 131 to 88 on the week of February 6, 1993. In the next week, sales increased 83% and the album jumped to 41 following his appearance at the American Music Awards of 1993, where he won three awards. Sales increased 40% in the following week due to the historic ratings of the Super Bowl XXVII halftime show performance, and the album jumped again from 88 to 41 on the Billboard 200, selling over 21,000 copies. On the next week, the album continued to climb to number 26, selling 29,000 units, up 40% from the previous week. On the week of February 27, 1993, album sales increased again because of the strong ratings for the Michael Jackson Talks ... to Oprah television special, selling close to 60,000 units and jumping from 26 to 12. In the following week, the album re-entered the top 10 in the United States. As of December 1993, sales for Dangerous were around 4.8 million copies and reached 5.5 million by September 1995. In August 2018, the album was certified eight-times platinum by the RIAA for shipments of over 8 million copies.

In Europe, it was reported that the album reached 4 million copies in shipments before it was released, becoming an all-time record at the time. It dominated global charts, debuting at number one in the UK with 205,000 copies sold within a 3-day tracking period and becoming the fastest number-one selling album of all time in the UK, while also reaching number one in 12 other territories, including Australia, France, Germany, the Netherlands, and Spain. Due to the massive success of the Dangerous World Tour, album sales for Dangerous received a boost. In the first four weeks of the tour in 1992, sales of the album increased from 6.8 million to 7.2 million units in Europe.

Dangerous became fastest-selling album in Sony Music Australia's history. In its first month of release it accumulated 310,000 sold units.

Dangerous was awarded as the best-selling album worldwide of 1992. It reached the 10 million mark in sales in the first two months after its release; Jackson's two previous albums, Bad and Thriller, each took more than four months to achieve that goal. By September 1994, the album had reportedly sold 25 million copies worldwide. By recent estimates, Dangerous has sold over 32 million copies worldwide making it one of the best-selling albums of all time.

== Promotion ==
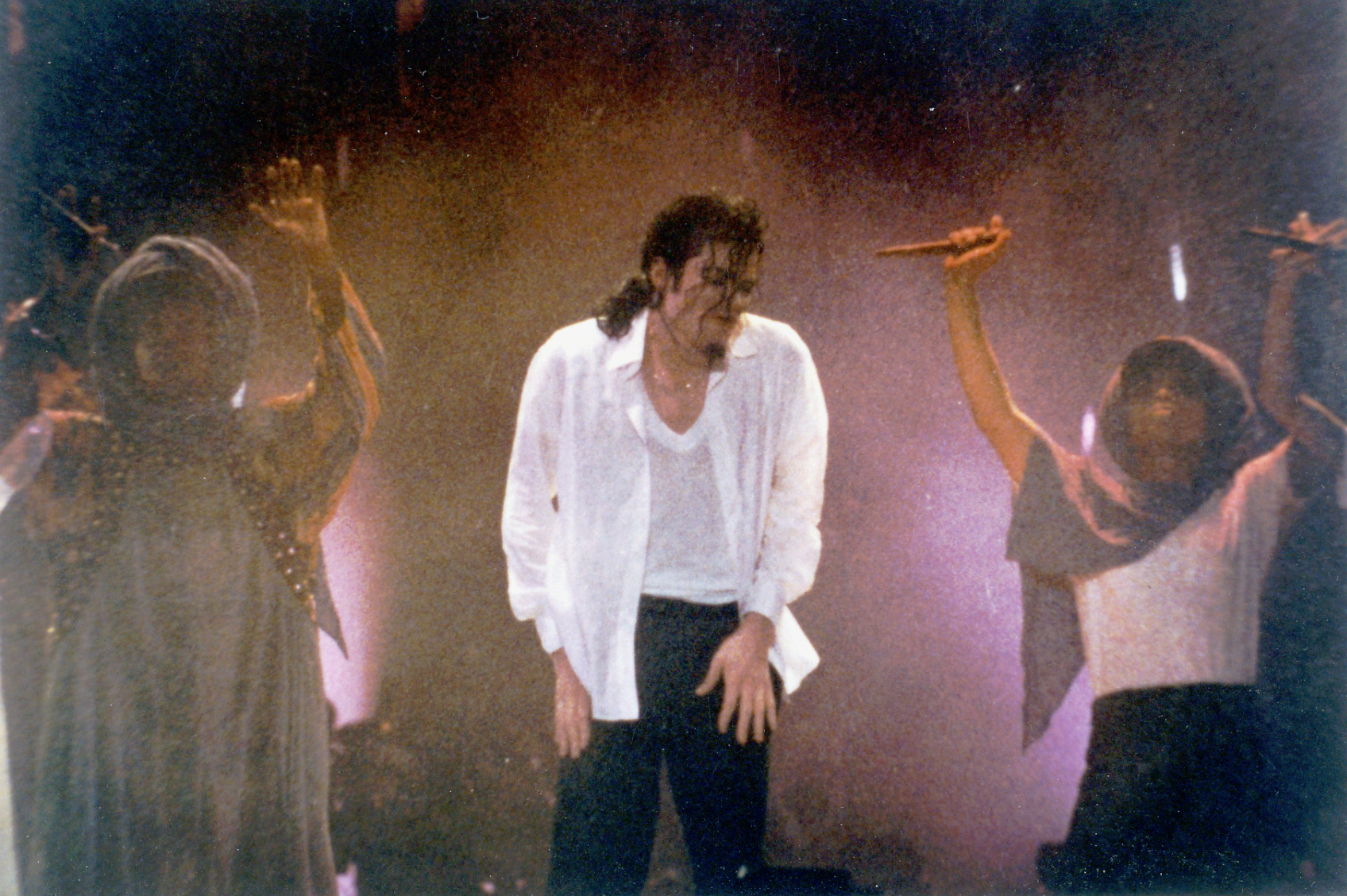
Jackson during a performance of "Will You Be There" at the Dangerous World Tour in 1992

Similar to the way in which record label executives had approached Bad, expectations were set at a high bar for Dangerous. In September 1991, Jackson netted a deal to have his videos air on FOX alongside regular music-video channels MTV, BET and VH1.

The 11-minute video for "Black or White" debuted on November 14, 1991, and was broadcast across 27 countries. 500 million viewers reportedly watched it—the largest audience ever for a music video. The music video and its controversy boosted the sale of Dangerous, as did the broadcast of videos for "Remember the Time" and "In the Closet".

Jackson performed the live debuts of "Black or White" with Slash, and "Will You Be There" during MTV's 10th Anniversary Special that was recorded on November 15-16, 1991 and later aired on ABC on November 27, 1991, one day after the release of Dangerous.

The Dangerous: The Short Films collection of music videos from Dangerous, with behind-the-scenes footage, was released in 1993.

Jackson embarked on the Dangerous World Tour, which grossed $100 million (equivalent to $177 million in 2020) and drew nearly 4 million people across 72 concerts. All profits from the tour were donated to charities including Jackson's Heal the World Foundation. The Bucharest concert was filmed on October 1, 1992, for broadcast on HBO on October 10. Jackson sold the film rights for the concert for $20 million, then the highest amount for a concert performer to appear on television. The airing of the HBO concert special, Michael Jackson: Live in Bucharest, revived sales of the album.

Jackson made personal appearances in early 1993, including at the American Music Awards and Grammy Awards, when he accepted the Grammy Legend Award from his sister Janet. He also filmed a widely discussed interview with Oprah Winfrey and made a half-time performance at the Super Bowl XXVII, which started the NFL's trend of signing top acts to appear during the Super Bowl to attract more viewers and interest. The performance helped return Dangerous to the US album chart's top 10. In August 1993, as the third leg of the Dangerous World Tour began, the first allegations of child sexual abuse against Jackson became public and received worldwide media attention. In November, Jackson canceled the remainder of the tour, citing health problems arising from the scandal.

== Singles ==
The lead single, "Black or White", was released in November 1991, reaching the top of the Billboard Hot 100 chart three weeks after it was released and staying there for seven weeks. It was the fastest chart-topper since the Beatles' "Get Back" in 1969 and the best-selling single worldwide of 1992. "Black or White" reached number one in 20 countries, including the US, the UK, Canada, Mexico, Cuba, Turkey, Zimbabwe, Australia, New Zealand, Belgium, Denmark, Finland, France, Ireland, Israel, Italy, Norway, Spain, Sweden, Switzerland and the Eurochart Hot 100. It became the first American single to enter the UK Singles Chart at number one since "It's Now or Never" by Elvis Presley in 1960. The singles were more successful overseas than in the US. In the UK alone, seven singles reached the top ten. This set a record for any studio album in the UK until Calvin Harris surpassed it in 2013.

"Remember the Time" peaked at number three on the Billboard Hot 100 singles chart and number one on the R&B Singles Chart. It reached number one in New Zealand charts for two consecutive weeks. In the United Kingdom, the song charted at number three, where it peaked. It peaked at number four in the Netherlands and Switzerland. The song also charted within the top ten on the French, Australian, Swedish, Italian, and Norwegian charts; peaking at number five, six, eight and ten. It charted in the top 20, peaking at number 16, in Austria. It was generally well received by contemporary music critics and regarded as one of the highlight songs on Dangerous.

The album's third single, "In the Closet" peaked at number six on the Billboard Hot 100, also reached number one on the R&B Singles Chart, becoming the album's third consecutive top 10 hit. In the United Kingdom, the song charted at number eight, where it peaked. The song's female vocal was originally labeled "Mystery Girl" but was later revealed to be Princess Stéphanie of Monaco.

"Jam" only reached number 26 on the Billboard Hot 100, despite heavy promotion. The music video of the song featured NBA icon Michael Jordan. The song was played in the Chicago Bulls' 1992 NBA Championship video Untouchabulls and was used in many promotional NBA ads of that season. In the UK, the single reached the top twenty, where it peaked at number 13.

"Who Is It" peaked at number 14 on the United States' Billboard Hot 100, while peaking at number six on the Billboard Hot R&B Singles chart, as well as topping the Hot Dance Club Play chart. The song peaked on the United Kingdom music chart at number ten. It remained within the top 100 positions for seven consecutive weeks from July to September 1992. In France, the track peaked at number eight on August 29. "Who Is It" reached its lowest peak position at number 34 in Australia.

"Heal the World" peaked at number 27 on the Billboard Hot 100. The song reached number two in the UK Singles Chart in December 1992. In a 2001 Internet chat with fans, Jackson said "Heal the World" was the song he was most proud to have created.

The overseas-only single "Give In to Me" reached the top five in the UK, Netherlands and Australia, while hitting the top of the charts in New Zealand.

"Will You Be There" was the last top-ten single on the Billboard Hot 100 from the album, peaking at number seven. The song peaked at number two in New Zealand and reaching the top ten in Belgium, Canada, Ireland, the Netherlands, Switzerland and the United Kingdom. It was the theme of the 1993 film Free Willy. Its appearance in the film also helped sales for Dangerous.

"Gone Too Soon", another overseas single, charted within the top 40 in the UK. Jackson performed the song at president-elect Bill Clinton's inauguration celebration An American Reunion: The 52nd Presidential Inaugural Gala.

== Critical reception ==
Professional ratings
Review scores
Source	Rating
Chicago Tribune	2/4 stars
Dayton Daily News	2/4 stars
Entertainment Weekly	B−
Los Angeles Times	3/4 stars
NME	3/10
Q	4/5 stars
Rolling Stone	4.5/5 stars
Select	5/5 stars
Smash Hits	9/10
The Village Voice	A−

Retrospective ratings
Review scores
Source	Rating
AllMusic	3.5/5 stars
Blender	3/5 stars
Christgau's Consumer Guide	A−
Encyclopedia of Popular Music	4/5 stars
MusicHound Rock	4/5 stars
Pitchfork	8.6/10
The Rolling Stone Album Guide	2/5 stars
Tom Hull – on the Web	B+

Dangerous was generally a critical success, with some considering it an improvement to Bad. Robert Christgau of The Village Voice deemed it Jackson's most consistent album since Off the Wall and an improvement over Bad despite his "annoying" vocal mannerisms. While he felt Jackson was too insistent with the "faith-hope-and-charity" message, Christgau applauded the "abrasively unpredictable" rhythms and the "sex-and-romance" songs, calling them the most plausible of Jackson's career. Mat Snow of Q called Dangerous Jackson's "most mature, most musically adventurous album yet", with a "rawer, edgier sound" owing to the replacement of Jones with Riley and Bottrell. He praised it as Jackson's boldest leap artistically since Off the Wall.

Alan Light of Rolling Stone praised for Jackson's vocals, crediting Riley's production dance rhythms for being a perfect match for Jackson's "clipped, breathy uptempo voice". Tom Doyle of Smash Hits described Dangerous as a "cracker", applauding the number of "great" songs. Chris Willman, writing for the Los Angeles Times, particularly praised the first half for its "remarkable uniformity", crediting the inclusion of hip hop and contemporary R&B. However, although he felt Dangerous was "mostly good, expertly made fun", he felt it was far from Jackson's best work. Willman also criticized "Heal the World" as "goofily embarrassing" and "venturing into the realm of self-parody". John Antezak of Enterprise-Record wrote, "Dangerous has the vintage Michael Jackson sound. It reflects a clear social conscience and it is a highly refined album designed to offer something appealing to every pop music audience."

Jon Pareles of The New York Times called Dangerous Jackson's "least confident" solo album yet. He believed Jackson sounded anxious and out of place with Riley's electronic beats and panned the "dogmatically ordinary" lyrics of the love songs, writing that "they seem based on demographic research rather than experience or imagination". David Browne of Entertainment Weekly was of similar view, calling Dangerous the least assured of Jackson's post-Motown records, with "a belabored attempt to be all things to all record buyers at a time when such a goal may be beyond even Jackson's reach". In Dayton Daily News, Dave Larsen described the first five tracks as "dull and sterile" with the "same incessant beat". He criticized Jackson for "following musical trends instead of setting them". Dave Bangert of Journal and Courier wrote that Dangerous is "serviceable", and that Jackson "plays catchup to the new jack swing era" that "passed him by during his secluded hiatus since Bad".

=== Awards ===
Dangerous received four Grammy Award nominations at the 1993 ceremony, including three for Jackson: Best Pop Vocal Performance for "Black or White", and Best R&B Vocal Performance and Best R&B Song for "Jam". Dangerous was awarded Best Engineered Album, Non Classical, making it Jackson's third consecutive album to win the award; it went to the producers Riley and Swedien. Jackson won two awards and received five nominations total at the 1993 American Music Awards, with the album winning Favorite Pop/Rock Album and "Remember the Time" winning Favorite Soul/R&B Song. Jackson won Best R&B/Soul Album of the Year – Male and Best R&B/Soul Single – Male for "Remember the Time" at the 1993 Soul Train Music Awards. At the 1993 NAACP Image Awards, "Black or White" won Outstanding Music Video, and Jackson won the Entertainer of the Year Award. At the 1993 World Music Awards, Jackson was awarded the Best-Selling World Artist of the Year and the American Recording Artist of the Year. At the 1994 MTV Movie Awards, "Will You Be There" won Best Song From a Movie. Internationally, the album earned Jackson the Best International Album award by Rockbjörnen, a Swedish music prize. The Japan Gold Disc Awards also awarded it Grand Prix Album of the Year.

The 1992 Billboard Music Awards awarded Jackson Best Worldwide Album for Dangerous and Best Worldwide Single for "Black or White", both of which were special awards. This was in recognition of their respective world record sales. The inaugural International Artist Award by the American Music Awards also went to Jackson in recognition of his global success and humanitarian efforts; it was his third special award by the organization, following the Merit in 1984 and the Lifetime Achievement in 1989. At the 1993 Soul Train Music Awards, Jackson won the special Humanitarian Award. At the World Music Awards, Jackson received a special award which was created by the IFPI for being the World's Best-Selling Artist of the Era following his heightened commercial success with Dangerous.

=== Rankings ===
In 2007, the National Association of Recording Merchandisers, in conjunction with the Rock and Roll Hall of Fame, ranked Dangerous at number 115 on its list of the "Definitive 200 Albums of All Time". In 2011, Spin named it one of the essential new jack swing albums. In 2014, Spin ranked it the 132nd-best album of the preceding 30 years. In Colin Larkin's third edition of the All Time Top 1000 Albums (2000), Dangerous was ranked number 325. Additionally, it was ranked number 13 in the list of the Soul/R&B – All Time Top 50 albums. Billboard ranked it the 43rd-best R/B or hip-hop album.

=== Accolades ===
Award	Date of ceremony	Category	Recipient(s)	Result	Ref.
American Music Awards	January 25, 1993	Favorite Pop/Rock Male Artist	Michael Jackson	Nominated	
American Music Awards	January 25, 1993	Favorite Pop/Rock Album	Dangerous	Won	
American Music Awards	January 25, 1993	Favorite Soul/R&B Male Artist	Michael Jackson	Nominated	
American Music Awards	January 25, 1993	Favorite Soul/R&B Album	Dangerous	Nominated	
American Music Awards	January 25, 1993	Favorite Soul/R&B Song	"Remember the Time"	Won	
Grammy Awards	February 24, 1993	Best Pop Vocal Performance, Male	"Black or White" — Michael Jackson	Nominated	
Grammy Awards	February 24, 1993	Best R&B Vocal Performance, Male	"Jam" — Michael Jackson	Nominated	
Grammy Awards	February 24, 1993	Best Rhythm & Blues Song	"Jam" — Michael Jackson, René Moore, Teddy Riley, Bruce Swedien	Nominated	
Grammy Awards	February 24, 1993	Best Engineered Album, Non-Classical	Teddy Riley, Bruce Swedien	Won	
Soul Train Music Awards	March 9, 1993	Best R&B/Soul Album of the Year – Male	Dangerous	Won	
Soul Train Music Awards	March 9, 1993	Best R&B/Soul Single – Male	"Remember the Time"	Won	
Soul Train Music Awards	March 9, 1993	Best R&B Music Video	"Remember the Time"	Nominated	

== Legacy ==
=== Reappraisal ===
Contemporary reviews on Dangerous have shown greater critical appraisal than it initially received upon release; some have considered it as Jackson's artistic peak. Following the special edition release of Dangerous in 2001, Ben Werner of Edmonton Journal lauded the album as "an all-stops-out opus that, in its best moments, shames it predecessors". Consequence of Sound's Michael Roffman described the album as "Jackson's 90s masterpiece". Jeff Weiss of Pitchfork called it "Jackson's final classic album and the best full-length of the New Jack Swing era." According to Weiss, Dangerous "might be Jackson's most complete album, spanning dance music to dark nights of the soul. It's a portrait of a persecuted genius". Writing for The Guardian, Ben Beaumont-Thomas deemed Dangerous as Jackson's career-high album, "the very peak of his powers, with his widest ever emotional range set to production that makes new jack swing seem much more than just lame dance moves and fluorescent man-made fibres".

Scholar Susan Fast thought of Dangerous as Jackson's coming-of-age album: "[The album] offers a compelling narrative arc of postmodern angst, love, lust, seduction, betrayal, damnation, and above all else racial politics, in ways heretofore unseen in his music." Tari Ngangura of Vice described Dangerous as one of the "greatest introspective albums of all time". Critic Joseph Vogel described the album as Jackson's most socially conscious record, most personally revealing—similar to Stevie Wonder's Songs in the Key of Life—and the most groundbreaking record of its era. He added, "Dangerous is gaining admirers as more people move beyond the extraneous nonsense that was so prominent in contemporaneous reviews and pay attention to its content: its prescient themes, its vast inventory of sounds, its panoramic survey of musical styles ... His R&B-rap fusions set the blueprint for years to come, while his industrial soundscapes and metallic beats were later popularized by artists as disparate as Nine Inch Nails and Lady Gaga".

Also writing for The Guardian in 2018, Vogel said, "Returning to [Dangerous] now, without the hype or biases that accompanied its release in the early 90s, one gets a clearer sense of its significance ... it surveyed the cultural scene—and the internal anguish of its creator—in compelling ways ... The contemporary music scene is certainly far more indebted to Dangerous". Vogel also credited the album as a significant factor to the transformation of Black music. Todd "Stereo" Williams of The Boombox said the album was Jackson's "blackest album" since Off the Wall—a return to his roots. He highlighted the cultural references in the music video "Black or White", the all Black cast and Black director for "Remember the Time", the casting of Black supermodel Naomi Campbell as the love interest in "In the Closet" and working with Teddy Riley, who was "R&B's biggest hit-maker" at the time. Williams also considered the album as a significant record of the 90s; it asserted Jackson as a formidable force in popular music amid the rise of grunge and gangsta rap.

Stephen Thomas Erlewine praised Jackson's brave approach in the album, that it was "a much sharper, riskier album" than Bad. Speaking for the Rock and Roll Hall of Fame, Janet Macoska applauded the modernity of Dangerous: "a sleek, contemporary-sounding update of Jackson's music" which featured the "ambitious, heartfelt anthems" "Heal the World" and "Will You Be There". Molly Brizzell of Screen Rant praised Dangerous, saying, "Where its predecessor, Bad, may have played things safe to replicate Thriller's success, Dangerous wasn't afraid to be bold and different." Al Shipley of Spin was of praise for Dangerous, ranking it in fourth place in the publication's list of all of Jackson's albums (including his discography as part of the Jackson 5/Jacksons). Shipley wrote, "On Dangerous, Riley helps carve a sharper figure out of the bloat and bombast that defines all of Jackson's post-Thriller albums, and Jackson's increasingly percussive vocal style came alive in new ways over Riley's propulsive new jack swing tracks."

== Track listing ==
Credits adapted from the album's CD booklet.

Dangerous track listing
No.	Title	Writer(s)	Producer(s)	Length
1.	"Jam" (with rap by Heavy D)	Michael Jackson; René Moore; Bruce Swedien; Teddy Riley	Jackson; Riley; Swedien	5:38
2.	"Why You Wanna Trip on Me"	Riley; Bernard Belle	Jackson; Riley	5:23
3.	"In the Closet" (featuring Princess Stéphanie of Monaco)	Riley; Jackson	Riley; Jackson	6:30
4.	"She Drives Me Wild" (with rap by Wreckx-n-Effect)	Jackson; Riley; Aqil Davidson	Jackson; Riley	3:39
5.	"Remember the Time"	Jackson; Riley; Belle	Jackson; Riley	3:59
6.	"Can't Let Her Get Away"	Jackson; Riley	Jackson; Riley	4:58
7.	"Heal the World"	Jackson	Jackson; Swedien^{[a]}	6:24
8.	"Black or White" (with rap by L.T.B.)	Jackson; Bill Bottrell	Jackson; Bottrell	4:14
9.	"Who Is It"	Jackson	Jackson; Bottrell	6:33
10.	"Give In to Me" (with guitar solo by Slash)	Jackson; Bottrell	Jackson; Bottrell	5:28
11.	"Will You Be There" (with introduction by the Cleveland Orchestra)	Jackson	Jackson; Swedien^{[a]}	7:40
12.	"Keep the Faith" (featuring Andraé Crouch)	Jackson; Glen Ballard; Siedah Garrett	Jackson; Swedien^{[a]}	5:56
13.	"Gone Too Soon"	Larry Grossman; Buz Kohan	Jackson; Swedien^{[a]}	3:21
14.	"Dangerous"	Jackson; Bottrell; Riley	Jackson; Riley	6:57
Total length:				76:47

Notes

- ^{^[a]} signifies a co-producer

== Personnel ==
Personnel as listed in the album's liner notes.

- John Bahler – vocal and choir arrangements (track 7)
- The John Bahler Singers – choir (track 7)
- Glen Ballard – arrangements (track 12)
- John Barnes – keyboards (track 8)
- Michael Boddicker – synthesizer (tracks 1, 7, 11–13), sequencer (8), keyboards and programming (9)
- Bill Bottrell – producer, engineer, and mixing (tracks 8–10); guitar (8, 10); drums (9, 10); percussion, rap, and intro voice-over (8); synthesizer (9); bass guitar and mellotron (10)
- Craig Brock – assistant guitar engineer (track 10)
- Brad Buxer – keyboards (tracks 1, 7–9, 11), synthesizer (1, 14), percussion (8), programming (9)
- Larry Corbett – cello (track 9)
- Andraé Crouch – choir arrangements (tracks 11, 12)
- Sandra Crouch – choir arrangements (tracks 11, 12)
- The Andraé Crouch Singers – choir (tracks 11, 12)
- Heavy D – rap (track 1)
- George Del Barrio – string arrangements (track 9)
- Matt Forger – engineer and mixing (track 7), engineering and sound design (8 intro)
- Kevin Gilbert – speed sequencer (track 8)
- Endre Granat – concertmaster (track 9)
- Linda Harmon – soprano voice (track 9)
- Jerry Hey – arrangements (track 12)
- Jean-Marie Horvat – engineer (track 14)
- Michael Jackson – producer and lead vocals (all tracks), background vocals (1–12, 14), arrangements (1, 9), vocal arrangements (1, 3–7, 11, 14), rhythm arrangements (7, 11), director (8 intro), soprano voice (9)
- Paul Jackson Jr. – guitar (track 2)
- Terry Jackson – bass guitar (track 8)
- Louis Johnson – bass guitar (track 9)
- Abraham Laboriel – bass guitar (track 13)
- Christa Larson – ending solo vocal (track 7)
- Rhett Lawrence – synthesizer (tracks 1, 11, 12, 14); drums, percussion, and arrangements (12); synthesizer programming (11)
- Bryan Loren – drums (track 8, 9), synthesizer (8)
- Johnny Mandel – orchestral arrangements and conductor (track 11)
- Jasun Martz – keyboards (track 8)
- Andres McKenzie – intro voice-over (track 8)
- Jim Mitchell – guitar engineer (track 10)
- René Moore – arrangements and keyboards (track 1)
- David Paich – keyboards (tracks 7, 9, 13), synthesizer (7, 13), keyboard arrangements and programming (9), rhythm arrangements (13)
- Marty Paich – orchestral arrangements and conductor (tracks 7, 13)
- Greg Phillinganes – keyboards (track 11)
- Tim Pierce – heavy metal guitar (track 8)
- Jeff Porcaro – drums (track 7)
- Steve Porcaro – synthesizer (tracks 7, 13), keyboards and programming (9)
- Teddy Riley – producer, engineer, mixing, and synthesizers (tracks 1–6, 14); keyboards (1–6); guitar (1, 2); rhythm arrangements (2–6, 14); synthesizer arrangements (3–6, 14); drums and arrangements (1)
- Thom Russo – engineer (track 14)
- Slash – special guitar performance (track 10)
- Brad Sundberg – technical director, engineer, assistant engineer (tracks 1, 7, 8, 9, 10, 11, 12, 13, 14)
- Bruce Swedien – producer (track 1), co-producer (tracks 7, 11–13), engineer and mixing (1–7, 11–14), arrangements and keyboards (1), drums (1, 11, 12), percussion (11, 12)
- Jai Winding – keyboards and programming (track 9), piano and synth bass (12)
- Mystery Girl (Princess Stéphanie of Monaco) – vocals (track 3)

== Charts ==
=== Weekly charts ===
Chart (1991–2021)	Peak position
Argentine Albums (CAPIF)	2
Australian Albums (ARIA)	1
Austrian Albums (Ö3 Austria)	2
Belgian Albums (IFPI)	1
Brazilian Albums (Pro-Música Brasil)	4
Canadian Albums (The Record)	2
Czech Albums (IFPI)	2
Danish Albums (Hitlisten)	1
Dutch Albums (Album Top 100)	1
European Albums (Music & Media)	1
Finnish Albums (Suomen virallinen albumilista)	1
French Albums (SNEP)	1
German Albums (Offizielle Top 100)	1
Greek Albums (IFPI)	1
Hungarian Albums (MAHASZ)	5
Irish Albums (IRMA)	1
Italian Albums (Musica e dischi)	2
Japanese Albums (Oricon)	5
Mexican Albums (AMPROFON)	6
New Zealand Albums (RMNZ)	1
Norwegian Albums (VG-lista)	1
Polish Albums (ZPAV)	6
Portuguese Albums (AFP)	7
Spanish Albums (AFYVE)	1
Swedish Albums (Sverigetopplistan)	2
Swiss Albums (Schweizer Hitparade)	1
UK Albums (OCC)	1
US Billboard 200	1
US Top R&B/Hip-Hop Albums (Billboard)	1

=== Year-end charts ===
Chart (1991)	Position
Australian Albums (ARIA)	47
Canadian Albums (RPM)	59
Dutch Albums (Album Top 100)	86
Swedish Albums (Sverigetopplistan)	39
UK Albums (OCC)	4

Chart (1992)	Position
Australian Albums (ARIA)	19
Austrian Albums (Ö3 Austria)	5
Canadian Albums (RPM)	22
Dutch Albums (Album Top 100)	12
German Albums (Offizielle Top 100)	3
New Zealand Albums (RMNZ)	13
Swedish Albums (Sverigetopplistan)	17
Swiss Albums (Schweizer Hitparade)	4
UK Albums (OCC)	4
US Billboard 200	2
US Top R&B/Hip-Hop Albums (Billboard)	3

Chart (1993)	Position
Australian Albums (ARIA)	27
Austrian Albums (Ö3 Austria)	20
Canadian Albums (RPM)	68
Dutch Albums (Album Top 100)	15
German Albums (Offizielle Top 100)	6
New Zealand Albums (RMNZ)	2
US Billboard 200	38
US Top R&B/Hip-Hop Albums (Billboard)	28

Chart (2009)	Position
UK Albums (OCC)	144

=== Decade-end charts ===
Chart (1990–1999)	Position
UK Albums (OCC)	17
US Billboard 200	44

== Certifications and sales ==
Region	Certification	Certified units/sales
Argentina	—	60,000
Australia (ARIA)	10× Platinum	740,000
Austria (IFPI Austria)	4× Platinum	200,000^{*}
Brazil (Pro-Música Brasil) Sales by January 1992	Gold	500,000
Canada (Music Canada)	6× Platinum	600,000^{^}
Chile	5× Platinum	100,000
Czech Republic	Gold	50,000
Denmark (IFPI Danmark)	3× Platinum	60,000^{‡}
Finland (Musiikkituottajat)	Platinum	61,896
France (SNEP)	Diamond	2,100,000
Germany (BVMI)	4× Platinum	2,000,000^{^}
Indonesia sales as of 1995	—	500,000
Ireland	—	75,000
Israel	Platinum	40,000
Italy sales as of 1995	—	650,000
Italy (FIMI) sales since 2009	Platinum	60,000^{*}
Japan (RIAJ)	2× Platinum	850,000
Mexico (AMPROFON)	2× Platinum+Gold	600,000^{^}
Netherlands (NVPI)	3× Platinum	300,000^{^}
New Zealand (RMNZ)	6× Platinum	90,000^{^}
Portugal (AFP)	2× Platinum	80,000^{^}
Singapore sales as of 1995	—	220,000
South Africa (RISA)	Gold	25,000^{‡}
Spain (Promusicae)	6× Platinum	600,000^{^}
Sweden (GLF)	3× Platinum	300,000^{^}
Switzerland (IFPI Switzerland)	5× Platinum	250,000^{^}
Taiwan sales as of 2009	—	400,000 (Note: In Taiwan, Dangerous sold 300,000 copies by 1993, and additional 100,000 copies by 2009, bringing the sales total to 400,000 copies.)
Thailand sales as of 1994	—	300,000
United Kingdom (BPI) Sales as of June 25, 2009	6× Platinum	2,200,000
United States (RIAA)	8× Platinum	8,000,000^{‡}
Summaries
Europe (Music & Media)	—	5,000,000
Worldwide	—	32,000,000
^{*} Sales figures based on certification alone.^{^} Shipments figures based on certification alone.^{‡} Sales+streaming figures based on certification alone.

== Release history ==
Release dates and formats for Dangerous
Region	Date	Edition(s)	Format(s)	Label(s)	Ref.
United Kingdom	November 21, 1991	Standard	CD; LP; Cassette	Epic	
Japan	November 25, 1991	Standard	CD; Box set; Cassette	Epic Records Japan; Sony	
United States	November 26, 1991	Standard	CD; LP; Cassette	Epic	
Various	November 26, 1991	Standard	CD; LP; Cassette	Epic	
Japan	January 18, 1992	Collector's Edition	CD	Epic Records Japan; Sony	
Various	February 17, 1992	Collector's Edition	CD	Epic	
Various	October 16, 2001	Special Edition	CD	Epic	
Japan	October 31, 2001	Special Edition	CD	Epic Records Japan; Sony	
Various	November 20, 2015	Standard	LP	Epic; Legacy; MJJ	
Various	August 24, 2018	Picture disc	LP	Epic; Legacy; MJJ	
Various	November 12, 2021	Colored reissue	LP	Epic; Legacy; MJJ	
Various	July 25, 2025	Audiophile Edition^{[b]}	Hybrid SACD; LP	Mobile Fidelity Sound Lab; Epic; MJJ	

Notes

- ^{^[b]} sourced from the original master tapes

== See also ==
- Dangerous World Tour
- Live in Bucharest: The Dangerous Tour
- Dangerous: The Short Films
- List of best-selling albums
- List of best-selling albums by country
- List of best-selling albums in Australia
- List of best-selling albums in Chile
- List of best-selling albums in Europe
- List of best-selling albums in France
- List of best-selling albums in Germany
- List of best-selling albums in Indonesia
- List of best-selling albums in Italy
- List of best-selling albums in Mexico
- List of best-selling albums in Taiwan
- List of most expensive albums
- List of number-one albums of 1991 (U.S.)
- List of number-one albums of 1992 (U.S.)
- List of number-one R&B albums of 1992 (U.S.)
