= Rocket (disambiguation) =

A rocket is a vehicle, missile, or aircraft propelled by an engine that creates thrust from a high speed exhaust jet made exclusively from propellant.

Rocket or Rockets may also refer to:

== Projectiles ==
- Rocket (firework)
- Rocket (weapon)

== Arts and entertainment ==
=== Characters ===
- Rocky the Flying Squirrel (Rocket J. Squirrel), in the US animated TV series The Rocky and Bullwinkle Show
- Rocket (DC Comics)
- Rocket Raccoon, Marvel Comics
  - Rocket (Marvel Cinematic Universe), adaptation of Rocket Raccoon
- Rocket Red, several DC Comics characters
- Team Rocket, a Pokémon team
- A character in the animated series Little Einsteins
- Zac's pet hound dog in the animated series Shimmer and Shine

=== Film ===
- The Rocket (2005 film), French-Canadian, about ice hockey player Maurice "The Rocket" Richard
- The Rocket (2013 film), Australia
- Rocket (film), India, 2015

=== Literature ===
- The Rocket (Malaysian magazine), a monthly political news magazine
- The Rocket (music magazine), a defunct weekly magazine in Seattle, Washington and Portland, Oregon
- "The Rocket" (short story), a 1950 science fiction short story by Ray Bradbury
- The Rocket (Slippery Rock), a weekly newspaper published by the students of Slippery Rock University
- Rocket Comics, a title published by Maple Leaf Publishing

=== Music ===
==== Bands ====
- Rocket (band), an American alternative rock band from Los Angeles, California active in the 2020s
- Rockets (band), a French space rock band formed in 1972 (a.k.a. Les Rockets)
- The Rockets (Detroit band), an American rock band from Detroit
- The Rockets (Los Angeles band), pre-Crazy Horse
- The Rockets, a Louisiana band featuring Dick Holler
- The Rockets, 1950s British rock and roll group led by Tony Crombie
- The Rockets, Kansas City big band led by Harlan Leonard, founded in 1937
- The Rockets, of Anson Funderburgh and the Rockets, a Texas blues band

==== Albums ====
- Rocket (Alex G album), 2017
- Rocket (Edie Brickell & New Bohemians album), 2018
- Rocket (Primitive Radio Gods album), 1996
- Rockets (Daniel Lanois album), 2005
- Rockets (Rockets album), by the French band, 1976
- The Rockets (album), by the Los Angeles band, 1968
- R Is for Rocket (album), 2025, by Rocket
- Rocket, 2025 mixtape by Dominic Fike

==== Songs ====
- "Rocket" (Beyoncé song), 2013
- "Rocket" (Def Leppard song), 1987
- "Rocket" (El Presidente song), 2005
- "Rocket" (En Vogue song), 2017
- "Rocket" (Goldfrapp song), 2010
- "Rocket" (Mohamed Ali song), 2009
- "Rocket" (Robbie Williams song), 2025
- "Rocket" (The Smashing Pumpkins song), 1993
- "Rocket", 1990, by Susumu Hirasawa from album The Ghost in Science
- "Rocket", 2021, by NCT Dream from album Hot Sauce
- "Rocket", 2002, by Nebula from album Dos EPs
- "Rockets", 2011, by Moby from album Destroyed
- "Rocket", 2011, by The Wanted from album Battleground
- "Rocket", 2013, by A Friend in London from album Unite
- "Rockets", 1981, by Joe Walsh from album There Goes the Neighborhood
- "Rockets", 2008, by Simple Minds from album Graffiti Soul

==== Recording labels ====
- The Rocket Record Company, a record label founded by Elton John

=== Other media ===
- Rocket: Robot on Wheels, a 1999 video game by Sucker Punch Productions
- The Rocket (painting), a 1909 painting by Edward Middleton Manigault
- The Rockets (1987–1991), a Canadian television show that aired on CTV

== Businesses ==
- Rocket (mobile financial service), a mobile banking service
- Rocket Internet, a startup incubator
- The Rocket, Euston, a Grade II listed public house in London, UK
- Rocket Companies, a fintech and homeownership services company
- Rocket Mortgage, a mortgage lender based in Detroit. Michigan; formerly Quicken Loans
- Rocket Software, a software development company

== Military ==
- HMS Rocket, eight ships of the Royal Navy and one planned ship
- Operation Rocket, a British Second World War Club Run supplying aircraft to the besieged island of Malta

== People ==
- Rocket (nickname)
- Owen Hart (1965–1999), Canadian professional wrestler with the ring name "The Rocket"
- Evan Dollard (born 1982), stage name from the 2008 American Gladiators TV series
- Maurice Richard (1921–2000), Canadian professional ice hockey player nicknamed "Rocket"
- Charles Rocket (1949–2005), stage name of American actor Charles Adams Claverie
- Mark Rocket, New Zealand entrepreneur who changed his surname from Stevens to Rocket

== Plants ==
- Diplotaxis tenuifolia (wild rocket), a perennial leafy vegetable
- Eruca sativa (garden rocket or arugula), an annual leafy vegetable
- Hesperis matronalis (dame's rocket), a wildflower
- Reseda luteola (dyer's rocket), a plant that makes a yellow dye
- Sisymbrium irio (London rocket), a herbal plant in the family Brassicaceae
- Blue rocket, another name for aconitum

== Sports teams ==
=== Basketball ===
- Bayi Rockets, a team in the Chinese Basketball Association
- Houston Rockets, a National Basketball Association team
- Oettinger Rockets, a German basketball team
- Reading Rockets, a team in the English Basketball League

=== Hockey ===
- Dundee Rockets, a defunct ice hockey club based in Dundee, Scotland
- Jacksonville Rockets, an Eastern Hockey League team from 1964 to 1972
- Kelowna Rockets, a Canadian Western Hockey League team
- Montreal Rocket, a Quebec Major Junior Hockey League team from 1999 to 2003
- P.E.I. Rocket, a Quebec Major Junior Hockey League team
- Philadelphia Rockets, an American Hockey League team of the 1940s
- Strathroy Rockets, a Canadian Greater Ontario Junior Hockey League team based in Strathroy, Ontario
- Tacoma Rockets, a junior ice hockey team in the Western Hockey League from 1991 to 1995
- Tacoma Rockets (PCHL and WHL), a professional ice hockey team in Tacoma, Washington, from 1946 to 1953

=== Other sports ===
- Air Transport Command Rockets, a World War II football team from the Air Transport Command
- Chicago Rockets, a team in the All-America Football Conference from 1946 to 1949
- Rye House Rockets, an English speedway team
- Toledo Rockets, the athletic teams of the University of Toledo
- Toronto Rockets (soccer), an American Professional Soccer League team for the 1994 season, based in Toronto, Ontario, Canada

== Vehicles ==
=== Trains and rolling stock ===
- Rocket (Reading locomotive), an early steam locomotive (1838) used by the Reading Railroad
- Rocket (Rock Island trains), streamlined diesel-electric passenger trains of the 1930s
- Stephenson's Rocket, also known as The Rocket, an early steam locomotive (1829)
- Toronto Rocket, a series of rolling stock used in the Toronto subway system in Toronto, Ontario, Canada
- Rocket, a South Devon Railway Comet class steam locomotive

=== Other vehicles ===
- HMS Rocket, eight ships of the Royal Navy and one planned ship
- Oldsmobile V8 engine, also called the Rocket
- A lightweight vehicle produced by the Light Car Company

== Other uses ==
- Rockets (candy), a fruit-flavored sugar candy known as Smarties in the US
- Rocket eBook, an e-reader produced by NuvoMedia in late 1998
- Rocket (web framework)
- Rocket Classic, a professional golf tournament in Michigan on the PGA Tour
- Rocket Arena, a multi-purpose arena in Cleveland, Ohio

== See also ==
- Rocket League, a video game
- Rocket immunoelectrophoresis, a biochemical method for determining protein concentration
- Rockett (disambiguation)
- Rockettes (disambiguation)
- Rockit (disambiguation)
- Roquet (disambiguation)
- Roquetes (disambiguation)
- Roquette (disambiguation)
- Roquettes
