= Roquette =

Roquette may refer to:

- Rocket Lettuce, a green leafy plant commonly used in salads
- Roquette Frères, producer of sugarless sweeteners
- De la Roquette Islands, Nunavut, Canada
- La Roquette, a commune in the Eure département, France
- La Roquette-sur-Siagne, a commune in the Alpes-Maritimes département, France
- La Roquette-sur-Var, a commune in the Alpes-Maritimes département, France
- La Roquette Prisons, prisons in Paris
- Marie-Christine Coisne-Roquette (born 1956), French businesswoman
- Peter Roquette (1927–2023), mathematician
- Suzanne Roquette (born 1942), German actress

== See also ==
- La Rouquette, a commune in the Aveyron department in southern France
- John Larroquette, American actor
- Roquettes, Haute-Garonne, France; a commune
- Roquetes (disambiguation)
- Roquet (disambiguation)
- Rockettes (disambiguation)
- Rocket (disambiguation)
