= Rock It =

Rock It may refer to:

== Songs ==
- "Rock It" (George Jones song), 1956
- "Rock It" (Lipps Inc. song), 1980
- "Rock It" (Little Red song), 2010
- "Rock It" / "Follow the Light", by Sub Focus, 2009
- "Rock It (Prime Jive)", by Queen, 1980
- "Rock It", by Master P from Game Face, 2001
- "Rock It", by Motörhead from Another Perfect Day, 1983
- "Rock It", by Ofenbach, 2019

== Other uses ==
- Rock It (music festival), an Australian music festival
- Rock It!, a 2007 Australian TV series

== See also ==
- Rockit (disambiguation)
- Rocket (disambiguation)
