= Roquet =

Roquet may refer to:

- Ghislaine Roquet (1926–2016), Companion of the Order of Canada
- Martinique's anole, a species of lizard whose scientific name is Anolis roquet
- Roquet, the technique of hitting an adjacent opponent's ball in croquet
- Roque, an American version of croquet
- Le Roquet, a comics convention founded by Dylan Horrocks
- roquet, a French term of disparagement for a small dog
- Roquette Frères, a starch production company

== See also ==
- Roquettes, Haute-Garonne, France; a commune
- Roquetes (disambiguation)
- Roquette (disambiguation)
- Rocket (disambiguation)
