= Roquetes =

Roquetes may refer to:

- Les Roquetes, Barcelona, a neighbourhood of the city of Barcelona, Catalonia, Spain
  - Roquetes (Barcelona Metro), a metro station
- Roquetes, Tarragona, a municipality in the province of Tarragona, Catalonia, Spain

== See also ==
- Roquetas de Mar, a municipality of Almería province, Andalucía, Spain
- Roquettes, Haute-Garonne, France; a commune
- Roquette (disambiguation)
- Roquet (disambiguation)
- Rocket (disambiguation)
