= List of awards and nominations received by Michael Jackson =

Michael Jackson awards and nominations
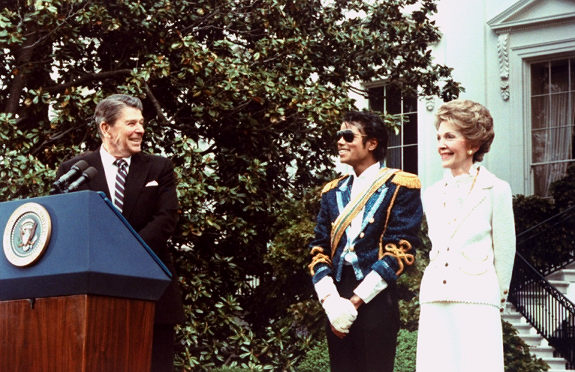
- Jackson being presented with an award by U.S. President Ronald Reagan for his work against drunk driving at a White House ceremony in 1984
Awards and nominations
Award	Wins	Nominations
American Music Awards	26	41
Billboard Music Awards (before and after 1990)	40	42
Blockbuster Entertainment Awards	1	1
Bravo Ottos	13	13
BMI Urban Awards	2	2
Brit Awards	6	7
Echo Awards	2	3
Grammy Awards	13	38
Juno Awards	1	6
MTV EMAs	1	5
MTV MMAs	1	1
MTV VMAs	5	19
NAACP Image Awards	10	16
NRJ Music Awards	2	2
People's Choice Awards	4	6
Rockbjörnen	2	2
Rock and Roll Hall of Fame	2	2
Rhythm and Blues Music Hall of Fame	1	1
Soul Train	11	22
World Music Awards	10	11

Michael Jackson (1958–2009) was an American singer. He debuted on the professional music scene at the age of 5, as a member of the Jackson 5, and began a solo career in 1971 while still a member of the group in subsequent years. Referred to as the "King of Pop", Jackson is often considered the greatest entertainer of all time and one of the most influential figures of the 20th century.

Jackson's career was rewarded with 13 Grammy Awards, as well as the Grammy Legend Award and Grammy Lifetime Achievement Award; 6 Brit Awards, 40 Billboard Music Awards (before and after 1990) and 26 American Music Awards. He currently holds 26 Guinness World Records out of a total of 36 records set in his lifetime, The organization also recognized Jackson as the world's most successful entertainer in 2006. He is a member of the Rock and Roll Hall of Fame, becoming one of only a few artists to be inducted twice (he was inducted in 1997 as a member of the Jackson 5 and again as a solo artist in 2001). Jackson was also inducted into the National Museum of Dance and Hall of Fame, making him the first and currently, only recording artist to be inducted. He was also inducted into the Songwriters Hall of Fame. Jackson was also inducted in 2014 into the Rhythm & Blues Hall of Fame along with his father Joe Jackson.

In 1984, Jackson was approached to donate "Beat It" as backing music for a commercial on drunk driving. Jackson agreed and it was arranged for the singer to be awarded with an honor from the president of the United States, Ronald Reagan. In April 1990, Jackson returned to the White House to be recognized as "Artist of the Decade" by President George H. W. Bush. Two years later, on May 1, 1992, President Bush presented Jackson with an award acknowledging him as "a point of light ambassador". Jackson received the award in recognition for his efforts in inviting disadvantaged children to his Neverland Ranch. Jackson was the only entertainer to receive the award. He has two Primetime Emmy Award nominations in 1983 and 1990. In 2000, Jackson was honored as the Artist of the Millennium at the world music awards and credited as the best selling solo artist of all time.

== Awards and nominations ==
Award/organization (Note: Listicles and charts are not included, unless they are explicitly described as "awards" or specific trophies are given.)	Year	Nominee/work	Category	Result	Ref.
African Ambassadors' Spouses Association	2004	Michael Jackson	Golden Elephant Award	Won	
African-American Film Critics Association	2009	This Is It	Special Achievement Award	Honoree	
American Black Achievement Awards	1980	Michael Jackson	The Music Award	Honoree	
American Black Achievement Awards	1984	Michael Jackson	The Music Award	Won	
American Black Achievement Awards	1986	"We Are the World" (shared with Harry Belafonte, Ken Kragen, Quincy Jones and Lionel Richie)	The Music Award	Won	
American Black Achievement Awards	1988	Michael Jackson	The Music Award	Honoree	
American Cinema Awards	1990	Michael Jackson	Entertainer of the Decade	Honoree	
America's Dance Honors	1990	Michael Jackson	Dancer of the Decade	Honoree	
American Music Awards
American Music Awards	1980	Favorite Soul/R&B Male Artist	Michael Jackson	Won	
American Music Awards	1980	Favorite Soul/R&B Album	Off the Wall	Won	
American Music Awards	1980	Favorite Soul/R&B Song	"Don't Stop 'til You Get Enough"	Won	
American Music Awards	1981	Favorite Pop/Rock Album	Off the Wall	Nominated	
American Music Awards	1981	Favorite Soul/R&B Male Artist	Michael Jackson	Won	
American Music Awards	1981	Favorite Soul/R&B Album	Off the Wall	Won	
American Music Awards	1984	Favorite Pop/Rock Male Artist	Michael Jackson	Won	
American Music Awards	1984	Favorite Pop/Rock Album	Thriller	Won	
American Music Awards	1984	Favorite Pop/Rock Song	"Billie Jean"	Won	
American Music Awards	1984	Favorite Pop/Rock Video	"Beat It"	Won	
American Music Awards	1984	Favorite Soul/R&B Male Artist	Michael Jackson	Won	
American Music Awards	1984	Favorite Soul/R&B Album	Thriller	Won	
American Music Awards	1984	Favorite Soul/R&B Song	"Billie Jean"	Won	
American Music Awards	1984	Favorite Soul/R&B Video	"Beat It"	Won	
American Music Awards	1984	Favorite Soul/R&B Video	"Billie Jean"	Nominated	
American Music Awards	1984	Award of Merit	Michael Jackson	Honoree	
American Music Awards	1985	Favorite Soul/R&B Male Artist	Michael Jackson	Nominated	
American Music Awards	1985	Favorite Pop/Rock Album	Thriller	Nominated	
American Music Awards	1985	Favorite Soul/R&B Album	Thriller	Nominated	
American Music Awards	1988	Favorite Pop/Rock Male Artist	Michael Jackson	Nominated	
American Music Awards	1988	Favorite Soul/R&B Song	"Bad"	Won	
American Music Awards	1989	Favorite Soul/R&B Male Artist	Michael Jackson	Nominated	
American Music Awards	1989	Favorite Pop/Rock Male Artist	Michael Jackson	Nominated	
American Music Awards	1989	Achievement Award	Michael Jackson	Honoree	
American Music Awards	1993	Favorite Pop/Rock Album	Dangerous	Won	
American Music Awards	1993	Favorite Pop/Rock Male Artist	Michael Jackson	Nominated	
American Music Awards	1993	Favorite Soul/R&B Male Artist	Michael Jackson	Nominated	
American Music Awards	1993	Favorite Soul/R&B Album	Dangerous	Nominated	
American Music Awards	1993	Favorite Soul/R&B Song	"Remember the Time"	Won	
American Music Awards	1993	International Artist Award	Michael Jackson	Honoree	
American Music Awards	1994	Favorite Pop/Rock Male Artist	Michael Jackson	Nominated	
American Music Awards	1994	Favorite Soul/R&B Male Artist	Michael Jackson	Nominated	
American Music Awards	1996	Favorite Pop/Rock Male Artist	Michael Jackson	Won	
American Music Awards	1996	Favorite Soul/R&B Male Artist	Michael Jackson	Nominated	
American Music Awards	1996	Favorite Adult Contemporary Artist	Michael Jackson	Nominated	
American Music Awards	2000	Favorite Artist of the Decade: 1980s (Fan vote)	Michael Jackson	Honoree	
American Music Awards	2002	Artist of the Century	Michael Jackson	Honoree	
American Music Awards	2009	Artist of the Year	Michael Jackson	Nominated	
American Music Awards	2009	Favorite Pop/Rock Album	Number Ones	Won	
American Music Awards	2009	Favorite Pop/Rock Male Artist	Michael Jackson	Won	
American Music Awards	2009	Favorite Soul/R&B Male Artist	Michael Jackson	Won	
American Music Awards	2009	Favorite Soul/R&B Album	Number Ones	Won	
American Video Awards
American Video Awards	1984	"Beat It"	Best Performance, Male	Won	
American Video Awards	1984	"Beat It"	Best Pop Video	Won	
American Video Awards	1985	Making of Thriller	Best Long Form Video	Won	
American Video Awards	1985	Making of Thriller	Best Home Video	Won	
Amusement & Music Operators Association (AMOA)
Amusement & Music Operators Association (AMOA)	1984	"Thriller"	Best Rock Record of the Year	Won	
Amusement & Music Operators Association (AMOA)	1984	"Beat It"	Best Pop Record of the Year	Won	
Amusement & Music Operators Association (AMOA)	1984	"Billie Jean"	Best Soul Record of the Year	Won	
Amusement & Music Operators Association (AMOA)	1984	Michael Jackson	Most Popular Artist of the Year	Won	
Apollo Legend Award
Apollo Legend Award	2010	Michael Jackson	Apollo Legend Award	Inducted	
Barbados Music Awards
Barbados Music Awards	2010	Michael Jackson	International Lifetime Achievement Award	Honoree	
Bambi Awards
Bambi Awards	2002	Michael Jackson	Pop Artist of the Millennium	Honoree	
BET Walk of Fame
BET Walk of Fame	1995	Michael Jackson	BET Walk of Fame	Inducted	
Billboard Music Awards	1989	Michael Jackson	Billboard Music Award for Spotlight The first Billboard Spotlight Award for being the first artist in history to have five number-one singles on Billboard Hot 100 from one album, Bad.	Honoree	
Billboard Music Awards	1992	Michael Jackson	Top R&B Artist	Nominated	
Billboard Music Awards	1992	Michael Jackson	Special Award for best-selling artists of past decade	Honoree	
Billboard Music Awards	1992	Dangerous	No. 1 World Album	Honoree	
Billboard Music Awards	1992	"Black or White"	No. 1 World Single	Honoree	
Billboard Music Awards	1992	Michael Jackson	Special Award commemorating the 10th Anniversary of Thriller	Honoree	
Billboard Music Awards	1995	"You Are Not Alone"	First Ever Hot 100 Debut at #1	Honoree	
Billboard Music Awards	2002	Michael Jackson	Special Award for 1982 album Thriller, which spent more weeks at No. 1 (37) than any other album in the history of the Billboard 200	Honoree	
Billboard Music Awards	2015	Xscape	Billboard Music Award for Top R&B Album	Nominated	
Billboard Video Awards
Billboard Video Awards	1983	"Beat It"	Best Performance by a Male Artist	Won	
Billboard Video Awards	1983	"Beat It"	Best Overall Video	Won	
Billboard Video Awards	1983	"Beat It"	Best Choreography	Won	
Billboard Video Awards	1983	"Beat It"	Best Use Of Video To Enhance Artist's Song	Won	
Billboard Video Awards	1983	"Beat It"	Best Use Of Video To Enhance Artist's Image	Won	
Billboard Video Awards	1984	"Thriller"	Best Long Form Video	Won	
Billboard Video Awards	1984	"Thriller"	Best Music Video	Won	
Billboard Number One Awards (Note: Prior to the inauguration of the Billboard Music Awards in 1990, the magazine had the "Number One Awards" to honor the top-performing artists of the year on each of chart categories.)
Billboard Number One Awards	1972	Michael Jackson	Top Singles Artist	Won	
Billboard Number One Awards	1972	Michael Jackson	Top Singles Male Vocalist	Won	
Billboard Number One Awards	1980	Michael Jackson	Top Black Artist	Won	
Billboard Number One Awards	1980	Off The Wall	Top Black Album	Won	
Billboard Number One Awards	1980	Off The Wall	Top Soul Album	Won	
Billboard Number One Awards	1980	Michael Jackson	Top Soul Artist	Won	
Billboard Number One Awards	1980	Michael Jackson	Top Pop Singles Artist	Won	
Billboard Number One Awards	1980	Michael Jackson	Top Pop Singles Male Vocal Artist	Won	
Billboard Number One Awards	1980	Michael Jackson	Top Soul Album Artist	Won	
Billboard Number One Awards	1980	Michael Jackson	Top Soul Single Artist	Won	
Billboard Number One Awards	1983	Michael Jackson	Top Pop Artist of the Year	Won	
Billboard Number One Awards	1983	Michael Jackson	Top Pop Artists - Male	Won	
Billboard Number One Awards	1983	Thriller	Top Pop Album	Won	
Billboard Number One Awards	1983	Michael Jackson	Top Pop Album Artist	Won	
Billboard Number One Awards	1983	Michael Jackson	Top Pop Album Artist-Male	Won	
Billboard Number One Awards	1983	Michael Jackson	Top Pop Singles Artist	Won	
Billboard Number One Awards	1983	Michael Jackson	Top Pop Singles Artist- Male	Won	
Billboard Number One Awards	1983	Michael Jackson	Top Black Artist of the Year	Won	
Billboard Number One Awards	1983	Michael Jackson	Top Black Artist-Male	Won	
Billboard Number One Awards	1983	Thriller	Top Black Album	Won	
Billboard Number One Awards	1983	Michael Jackson	Top Black Album artist	Won	
Billboard Number One Awards	1983	Michael Jackson	Top Black Album Artists - Male	Won	
Billboard Number One Awards	1983	Michael Jackson	Top Black Singles Artist	Won	
Billboard Number One Awards	1983	Michael Jackson	Top Black Singles Artist-Male	Won	
Billboard Number One Awards	1983	"Billie Jean / Beat It"	Top Disco/Dance singles/albums	Won	
Billboard Number One Awards	1983	Michael Jackson	Top Dance/Disco Artist	Won	
Billboard Number One Awards	1983	Michael Jackson	Top Disco Artist-Male	Won	
Billboard Number One Awards	1983	Thriller	Top U.K. Albums	Won	
Billboard Number One Awards	1984	Thriller	Top Pop Album	Won	
Billboard Number One Awards	1988	Michael Jackson	Top Black Artist	Won	
Billboard Number One Awards	1988	Michael Jackson	Top Black Album Artist - Male	Won	
Blockbuster Entertainment Awards
Blockbuster Entertainment Awards	1996	Michael Jackson	Favorite Pop Male Award	Won	
Black Gold Awards
Black Gold Awards	1984	Michael Jackson	Top Male Vocalist	Won	
Black Gold Awards	1984	Thriller	Best Album	Won	
Black Gold Awards	1984	"Billie Jean"	Best Single of the Year	Won	
Black Gold Awards	1984	"Beat It"	Best Video Performance	Won	
Black Music & Entertainment Walk of Fame	1984				
Black Music & Entertainment Walk of Fame	2021	Michael Jackson	Inaugural inductee	Won	
Black Radio Exclusive Awards
Black Radio Exclusive Awards	1983	Michael Jackson	Artist of The Year	Honoree	
Black Radio Exclusive Awards	1989	Michael Jackson	Triple Crown Award for his achievements in pop, rock and soul	Honoree	
Black Radio Exclusive Awards	1989	Michael Jackson	Humanitarian of the Year	Honoree	
BMI Urban Awards
BMI Urban Awards	1983	Michael Jackson	Pop Songwriter of the Year	Won	
BMI Urban Awards	1990	Michael Jackson	1st Michael Jackson Award of Achievement	Honoree	
Bollywood Movie Awards
Bollywood Movie Awards	1999	Michael Jackson	Humanitarian Award	Honoree	
Boy Scouts of America
Boy Scouts of America	1990	Michael Jackson	Good Scout Humanitarian Award	Honoree	
Bravo Otto
Bravo Otto	1987	Michael Jackson	Silver Otto Award	Won	
Bravo Otto	1988	Michael Jackson	Gold Otto Award	Won	
Bravo Otto	1989	Michael Jackson	Bronze Otto Award	Won	
Bravo Otto	1992	Michael Jackson	Gold Otto Award	Won	
Bravo Otto	1993	Michael Jackson	Gold Otto Award	Won	
Bravo Otto	1994	Michael Jackson	Gold Otto Award	Won	
Bravo Otto	1995	Michael Jackson	Gold Otto Award	Won	
Bravo Otto	1996	Michael Jackson	Silver Otto Award	Won	
Bravo Otto	1996	Michael Jackson	Platinum Otto/Lifetime Achievement Award	Honoree	
Bravo Otto	1997	Michael Jackson	Silver Otto Award	Won	
Bravo Otto	2009	Michael Jackson	Gold Otto Award	Won	
Bravo Otto	2010	Michael Jackson	Silver Otto Award	Won	
Bravo Otto	2011	Michael Jackson	Bronze Otto Award	Won	
Brit Awards
Brit Awards	1984	Michael Jackson	International Artist	Won	
Brit Awards	1984	Thriller	British Album of the Year	Won	
Brit Awards	1985	Michael Jackson	International Artist	Nominated	
Brit Awards	1988	Michael Jackson	International Solo Artist	Won	
Brit Awards	1989	Michael Jackson	International Male Solo Artist	Won	
Brit Awards	1989	"Smooth Criminal"	British Video of the Year	Won	
Brit Awards	1996	Michael Jackson	Artist of a Generation Award	Honoree	
CableACE Award
CableACE Award	1984	"The Making of Thriller"	Documentary Special	Nominated	
CableACE Award	1994	Michael Jackson	Performance in a Music Special or Series	Won	
Canadian Black Music Awards
Canadian Black Music Awards	1984	Michael Jackson	Top Male Vocalist	Won	
Canadian Black Music Awards	1984	Michael Jackson	Entertainer of the Year	Won	
Canadian Black Music Awards	1984	Thriller	Top International Album	Won	
Canadian Black Music Awards	1984	"Billie Jean"	Top International Single	Won	
Capital Children's Museum	1990	Michael Jackson	Humanitarian Award	Honoree	
Cashbox Awards	1980	Off the Wall	Top Soul Album	Won	
Cashbox Awards	1980	Michael Jackson	Top Male Black Contemporary Crossover	Won	
Cashbox Awards	1980	Off the Wall	Black Contemporary Album	Won	
Cashbox Awards	1983	Michael Jackson	Number One Male Artist	Won	
Cashbox Awards	1983	Billie Jean	Pop Single	Won	
Cashbox Awards	1983	Michael Jackson	Male-Singles Artist	Won	
Cashbox Awards	1983	Thriller	Black Album	Won	
Cashbox Awards	1983	Thriller	Pop Album	Won	
Cashbox Awards	1983	Michael Jackson	Black Male Artist	Won	
Cashbox Awards	1983	Michael Jackson	Black Male-Singles Artist	Won	
Cashbox Awards	1983	Billie Jean	Black Single	Won	
Cashbox Awards	1989	Michael Jackson	Video Pioneer Award	Honoree	
Celebrate the Magic Foundation	2002	Michael Jackson	Magic Life Award	Honoree	
Children's Choice Awards	1994	Michael Jackson	Caring for Kids Award	Honoree	
Children Uniting Nations Oscar Celebration	2010	Michael Jackson	Angel Award	Honoree	
Countdown Music and Video Awards	1984	Michael Jackson	Special Achievement	Honoree	
Countdown Music and Video Awards	1984	Michael Jackson	Most Popular International Act	Nominated	
Creative Excellence in Business Advertising (CEBA)	1989	Michael Jackson: The Legend Continues	Best Production	Won	
Crenshaw Community Youth & Arts Foundation	1994	Michael Jackson	Humanitarian Award	Honoree	
Danish Music Awards	1996	Michael Jackson	Best International Male Artist	Won	
Danish Music Awards	1996	HIStory: Past, Present and Future, Book I	Best International Album	Won	
Echo Awards	1993	Michael Jackson	Best International Rock/Pop Male Artist	Won	
Echo Awards	2010	Michael Jackson	Hall of Fame	Inducted	
Echo Awards	2015	Michael Jackson	Best Rock/Pop International Artist of the year	Nominated	
G&P Foundation Angel Ball	2000	Michael Jackson	Angel Of Hope Award (for outstanding contribution to the fight against Cancer)	Honoree	
Genesis Awards	1988	Man in the Mirror	1988 Doris Day Music Award	Won	
Genesis Awards	1996	Earth Song	1995 Doris Day Music Award	Won	
Ghana Tribute Committee	1995	Michael Jackson	Diamond of Africa	Honoree	
Gold Star Award	1971	Michael Jackson	Best Singer of 1971	Won	
Golden Apple Award	1996	Michael Jackson	Sour Apple	Nominated	
Grammy Award
Grammy Award	1979	"Ease On down the Road" (with Diana Ross)	Best R&B Vocal Performance by a Duo or Group	Nominated	
Grammy Award	1980	"Don't Stop 'Til You Get Enough"	Best R&B Vocal Performance, Male	Won	
Grammy Award	1980	"Don't Stop 'Til You Get Enough"	Best Disco Recording	Nominated	
Grammy Award	1984	Thriller	Album of the Year	Won	
Grammy Award	1984	Thriller	Best Pop Vocal Performance, Male	Won	
Grammy Award	1984	"Beat It"	Record of the Year	Won	
Grammy Award	1984	"Beat It"	Song of the Year	Nominated	
Grammy Award	1984	"Beat It"	Best Rock Vocal Performance, Male	Won	
Grammy Award	1984	"The Girl Is Mine" (feat. Paul McCartney)	Best Pop Vocal Performance by a Duo or Group	Nominated	
Grammy Award	1984	"Billie Jean"	Song of the Year	Nominated	
Grammy Award	1984	"Billie Jean"	Best R&B Vocal Performance, Male	Won	
Grammy Award	1984	"Billie Jean"	Best Rhythm & Blues Song	Won	
Grammy Award	1984	"Wanna Be Startin' Somethin'"	Best Rhythm & Blues Song	Nominated	
Grammy Award	1984	E.T. the Extra Terrestrial (with Quincy Jones)	Best Recording for Children	Won	
Grammy Award	1984	Thriller (with Quincy Jones)	Producer of the Year, Non-Classical	Won	
Grammy Award	1985	"Tell Me I'm Not Dreamin' (Too Good to Be True)" (with Jermaine Jackson)	Best R&B Vocal Performance by a Duo or Group	Nominated	
Grammy Award	1985	Making Michael Jackson's Thriller	Best Video Album	Won	
Grammy Award	1986	"We Are the World" (with Lionel Richie)	Song of the Year	Won	
Grammy Award	1988	Bad	Album of the Year	Nominated	
Grammy Award	1988	Bad	Producer of the Year, Non-Classical	Nominated	
Grammy Award	1988	Bad	Best Pop Vocal Performance, Male	Nominated	
Grammy Award	1988	Bad	Best R&B Vocal Performance, Male	Nominated	
Grammy Award	1989	"Man in the Mirror"	Record of the Year	Nominated	
Grammy Award	1990	"Leave Me Alone"	Best Music Video, Short Form	Won	
Grammy Award	1990	Moonwalker	Best Music Video, Long Form	Nominated	
Grammy Award	1993	"Black or White"	Best Pop Vocal Performance, Male	Nominated	
Grammy Award	1993	"Jam"	Best R&B Vocal Performance, Male	Nominated	
Grammy Award	1993	"Jam"	Best R&B Song	Nominated	
Grammy Award	1996	HIStory: Past, Present and Future, Book I	Album of the Year	Nominated	
Grammy Award	1996	"You Are Not Alone"	Best Male Pop Vocal Performance	Nominated	
Grammy Award	1996	"Scream" (with Janet Jackson)	Best Pop Collaboration with Vocals	Nominated	
Grammy Award	1996	"Scream" (with Janet Jackson)	Best Music Video, Short Form	Won	
Grammy Award	1997	"Earth Song"	Best Music Video, Short Form	Nominated	
Grammy Award	2002	"You Rock My World"	Best Male Pop Vocal Performance	Nominated	
Grammy Award	2011	"This Is It"	Best Male Pop Vocal Performance	Nominated	
Grammy Legend Award	1993	Michael Jackson	Grammy Legend Award	Honoree	
Grammy Lifetime Achievement Award	2010	Michael Jackson	Grammy Lifetime Achievement Award	Honoree	
Grammy Hall of Fame	2008	Thriller	Grammy Hall of Fame	Inducted	
Grammy Hall of Fame	2008	Off the Wall	Grammy Hall of Fame	Inducted	
Hollywood Walk of Fame	1980	The Jacksons	Hollywood Walk of Fame Star	Honoree	
Hollywood Walk of Fame	1984	Michael Jackson	Hollywood Walk of Fame Star	Honoree	
Jack the Rapper Awards	1993	Michael Jackson	"Our Children, Our Hope of Tomorrow" Award	Honoree	
Jack the Rapper Awards	1993	"Black or White"	Outstanding Music Video	Won	
Japan Gold Disc Awards	1988	Bad	Grand Prix Album of the Year	Won	
Japan Gold Disc Awards	1988	Bad	Rock/Folk - Solo	Won	
Japan Gold Disc Awards	1992	Dangerous	Grand Prix Album of the Year	Won	
Japan Gold Disc Awards	1992	Dangerous	Rock/Folk	Won	
Japan Gold Disc Awards	1998	HIStory on Film, Volume II	Best International Video	Won	
Japan Gold Disc Awards	2010	Michael Jackson's This Is It	Best International Album	Won	
Juno Awards	1983	Thriller	International Album of the Year	Nominated	
Juno Awards	1984	Billie Jean	International Single of the Year	Won	
Juno Awards	1989	Bad	International Album of the Year	Nominated	
Juno Awards	1989	Michael Jackson	International Entertainer of the Year	Nominated	
Juno Awards	1992	Black or White	Best Selling Single by a Foreign Artist	Nominated	
Juno Awards	1993	Black or White	Best Selling Single (Foreign or Domestic)	Nominated	
Kora Awards	1999	Michael Jackson	Lifetime Achievement Award	Honoree	
MTV Europe Music Award
MTV Europe Music Award	1995	Michael Jackson	Best Male	Won	
MTV Europe Music Award	1995	"You Are Not Alone"	Best Song	Nominated	
MTV Europe Music Award	1997	Michael Jackson	Best Male	Nominated	
MTV Europe Music Award	1997	Michael Jackson	Best R&B	Nominated	
MTV Europe Music Award	1997	Michael Jackson	Best Live Act	Nominated	
MTV Video Music Awards Japan	2006	Michael Jackson	Legend Award	Honoree	
MTV Movie Awards	1994	"Will You Be There"	Best Song in a Movie	Won	
MTV Video Music Award	1984	"Thriller"	Video of the Year	Nominated	
MTV Video Music Award	1984	"Thriller"	Best Male Video	Nominated	
MTV Video Music Award	1984	"Thriller"	Best Concept Video	Nominated	
MTV Video Music Award	1984	"Thriller"	Best Overall Performance in a Video	Won	
MTV Video Music Award	1984	"Thriller"	Best Choreography in a Video (Note: Shared with Michael Peters.)	Won	
MTV Video Music Award	1984	"Thriller"	Viewer's Choice	Won	
MTV Video Music Award	1988	"Bad"	Best Choreography in a Video (Note: Credited to Jackson, Gregg Burge and Jeffrey Daniel.)	Nominated	
MTV Video Music Award	1988	"The Way You Make Me Feel"	Best Choreography in a Video (Note: Credited to Jackson and Vincent Paterson.)	Nominated	
MTV Video Music Award	1988	Himself	Video Vanguard Award	Honoree	
MTV Video Music Award	1989	"Leave Me Alone"	Video of the Year	Nominated	
MTV Video Music Award	1989	"Leave Me Alone"	Breakthrough Video	Nominated	
MTV Video Music Award	1989	"Leave Me Alone"	Viewer's Choice	Nominated	
MTV Video Music Award	1989	"Smooth Criminal"	Best Dance Video	Nominated	
MTV Video Music Award	1989	"Smooth Criminal"	Best Choreography in a Video (Note: Credited to Jackson and Vincent Paterson.)	Nominated	
MTV Video Music Award	1995	"Scream" (with Janet Jackson)	Video of the Year	Nominated	
MTV Video Music Award	1995	"Scream" (with Janet Jackson)	Best R&B Video	Nominated	
MTV Video Music Award	1995	"Scream" (with Janet Jackson)	Best Dance Video	Won	
MTV Video Music Award	1995	"Scream" (with Janet Jackson)	Breakthrough Video	Nominated	
MTV Video Music Award	1995	"Scream" (with Janet Jackson)	Viewer's Choice	Nominated	
MOBO Awards	2009	Michael Jackson	Lifetime Achievement Award	Honoree	
MTV Video Vanguard Artist of the Decade Award	1990	Michael Jackson	Artist of the Decade	Honoree	
Music Connection	1990	Michael Jackson	Man of the Decade	Honoree	
Muz-TV Awards	2010	Michael Jackson	Award for contributions to the international pop-culture	Honoree	
NAACP Image Award	1980	Michael Jackson	Outstanding Actor in a Motion Picture	Won	
NAACP Image Award	1983		Entertainment of the Decade (Shared with Quincy Jones)	Honoree	
NAACP Image Award	1988	Michael Jackson	Best Male Artist	Won	
NAACP Image Award	1988	Bad	Best Album	Won	
NAACP Image Award	1988	Michael Jackson	Leonard Carter Humanitarian Award	Honoree	
NAACP Image Award	1993	Michael Jackson	Entertainer of the Year	Honoree	
NAACP Image Award	1993	"Black or White"	Outstanding Music Video	Won	
NAACP Image Award	1996 |	Michael Jackson	Outstanding Male Artist	Nominated	
NAACP Image Award	1996 |	"You Are Not Alone"	Outstanding Song	Nominated	
NAACP Image Award	1996 |	"Scream" (with Janet Jackson)	Outstanding Music Video	Nominated	
NAACP Image Award	1996 |	"Earth Song"	Outstanding Music Video	Nominated	
NAACP Image Award	2002	"You Rock My World"	Outstanding Music Video	Won	
NAACP Image Award	2002	Michael Jackson: 30th Anniversary Special	Outstanding Variety Series/Special	Won	
NAACP Image Award	2002	Michael Jackson: 30th Anniversary Special	Outstanding Performance in a Variety Series/Special	Won	
NAACP Image Award	2015	Love Never Felt So Good	Outstanding Music Video	Nominated	
NAACP Image Award	2015	Michael Jackson	Outstanding Male Artist	Nominated	
NARM Gift of Music Awards
NARM Gift of Music Awards	1984	Thriller	Best Selling Album	Won	
NARM Gift of Music Awards	1984	"Billie Jean"	Best Selling Single	Won	
NARM Gift of Music Awards	1984	The Making of Thriller	Best Home Video	Won	
NARM Gift of Music Awards	1993	Dangerous	Best Selling Urban Music Recording Male	Won	
NARM Gift of Music Awards	1995	Michael Jackson	The Harry Chapin Memorial Humanitarian Award	Honoree	
National Association of Black Owned Broadcasters	1992	Michael Jackson	Lifetime Achievement Award	Honoree	
National Museum of Dance and Hall of Fame	2010	Michael Jackson	Hall of Fame	Inducted	
National Recording Registry	2009	Thriller	National Recording Registry	Inducted	
National Urban Coalition Awards	1989	Michael Jackson	Humanitarian Award	Honoree	
NME Awards	1983	"Thriller"	Best Promo Video	Won	
NME Awards	2017	"Off The Wall"	Best Reissue honor	Nominated	
NRJ Music Awards	2002	Michael Jackson	Best International Male Singer	Won	
NRJ Music Awards	2008	Michael Jackson	Lifetime Achievement Award	Honoree	
Oneness Awards	2003	Michael Jackson	Power of Oneness Award	Honoree	
Operation One to One Awards	1992	Michael Jackson	Operation One to One Award	Honoree	
People's Choice Awards
People's Choice Awards	1984	Michael Jackson	Best All Round Entertainer of the Year	Won	
People's Choice Awards	1984	Thriller	Favorite Video of the Year	Won	
People's Choice Awards	1986	"We Are the World"	Favorite New Song	Won	
People's Choice Awards	1989	"Smooth Criminal"	Favorite Music Video	Won	
People's Choice Awards	1989	Michael Jackson	Favorite Male Artist	Nominated	
People's Choice Awards	1996	Michael Jackson	Favorite Male Artist	Nominated	
Pocono Film Festival	2009	Michael Jackson	Humanitarian Award	Honoree	
Presidential honors	1984	Michael Jackson	Presidential Humanitarian Award	Honoree	
Presidential honors	1990	Michael Jackson	Artist of the Decade	Honoree	
Presidential honors	1992	Michael Jackson	Point of Light Ambassador	Honoree	
Premios Ondas	1992	Black or White	Best Clip	Won	
Primetime Emmy Award	1983	Motown 25: Yesterday, Today, Forever: Billie Jean Performance	Outstanding Individual Performance in a Variety or Music Program	Nominated	
Primetime Emmy Award	1990	"You Were There" Performed By Michael Jackson At Sammy Davis Jr's 60th Birthday Celebration	Outstanding Individual Performance in a Variety or Music Program	Nominated	
Pro-Set Los Angeles Music Awards
Pro-Set Los Angeles Music Awards	1992	Michael Jackson	Best Pop Male Vocalist	Won	
Pro-Set Los Angeles Music Awards	1992	"Black or White"	Video of the Year	Won	
Puls Music TV	1998	Michael Jackson	Best Foreign Male Singer	Won	
Puls Music TV	1998	Michael Jackson	Best Show of the Year - 1997	Won	
Radio Luxembourg Golden Lion Award	1993	Michael Jackson	Golden Lion	Honoree	
Radio Music Awards	2003	Michael Jackson	Humanitarian Award	Honoree	
Rhythm and Blues Music Hall of Fame	2014	Michael Jackson	Rhythm and Blues Music Hall of Fame	Inducted	
Rennbahn Express Magazine (Austria)	1988	Thriller	Video of the 80's	Honoree	
Rennbahn Express Magazine (Austria)	1988	Michael Jackson	Star of the 80's	Honoree	
RIAA Artists of the Century	1999	Michael Jackson	Top Selling Top R&B Artists of the Century	Honoree	
Rock and Roll Hall of Fame	2001	Michael Jackson	Rock and Roll Hall of Fame	Inducted	
Rockbjörnen	1987	Michael Jackson	Best International Artist	Won	
Rockbjörnen	1992	Dangerous	Best International Album	Won	
RTHK International Pop Poll Awards	1992	Michael Jackson	Pop Vocal Male	Nominated	
RTHK International Pop Poll Awards	1993	Remember the Time	Top Ten Gold Songs	Won	
RTHK International Pop Poll Awards	2009	"You Are Not Alone"	20th Anniversary Supreme Golden Song	Nominated	
RTHK International Pop Poll Awards	2010	"This Is It"	Top Ten International Gold Songs	Nominated	
RTHK International Pop Poll Awards	2010	Michael Jackson	Top Male Artist	Gold	
Saturn Awards	1979	Michael Jackson (for The Wiz)	Best Supporting Actor	Nominated	
Smash Hits	1987	Michael Jackson	Best Male Singer	Won	
Smash Hits	1987	Bad	Best LP	Won	
Smash Hits	1987	"Bad"	Best Video	Won	
Smash Hits	1988	Michael Jackson	Best Male Solo Singer	Won	
Smash Hits	1992	Michael Jackson	Best Male Solo Singer	Won	
Smash Hits	1993	Michael Jackson	Best Male Solo Singer	Won	
Smash Hits	1994	Michael Jackson	Best Male Solo Singer	Nominated	
Smash Hits	1995	Michael Jackson	Best Male Singer	Won	
Smash Hits	1996	Michael Jackson	Best Male Singer	Nominated	
Songwriters Hall of Fame	2002	Michael Jackson	Songwriters Hall of Fame	Inducted	
Soul Train Music Awards	1988	"Bad"	Best Single - Male	Won	
Soul Train Music Awards	1988	Bad	Album of the Year - Male	Won	
Soul Train Music Awards	1988	"The Way You Make Me Feel"	Best Music Video	Nominated	
Soul Train Music Awards	1989	Michael Jackson	Sammy Davis Jr. Award for Entertainer of the Year	Honoree	
Soul Train Music Awards	1989	Michael Jackson	Heritage Award for Career Achievement	Honoree	
Soul Train Music Awards	1989	Man in the Mirror	Best R&B/Soul Single – Male	Won	
Soul Train Music Awards	1989	Man in the Mirror	Best R&B/Urban Contemporary Music Video	Won	
Soul Train Music Awards	1989	Man in the Mirror	Best R&B/Urban Contemporary Song of the Year	Nominated	
Soul Train Music Awards	1992	"Black or White"	Best R&B/Soul Single – Male	Nominated	
Soul Train Music Awards	1992	"Black or White"	Best Music Video	Nominated	
Soul Train Music Awards	1993	Michael Jackson	Humanitarian Award	Honoree	
Soul Train Music Awards	1993	Dangerous	Best R&B/Soul Album – Male	Won	
Soul Train Music Awards	1993	"Remember the Time"	Best R&B/Soul Single – Male	Won	
Soul Train Music Awards	1993	"Remember the Time"	Best Music Video	Nominated	
Soul Train Music Awards	1995	Michael Jackson	Hall of Fame	Inducted	
Soul Train Music Awards	1996	"You Are Not Alone"	Best R&B/Soul Single - Male	Nominated	
Soul Train Music Awards	1996	HIStory: Past, Present and Future, Book I	Best R&B/Soul Album of the Year - Male	Nominated	
Soul Train Music Awards	1996	"Scream" (with Janet Jackson)	Best R&B/Soul or Rap Music Video	Nominated	
Soul Train Music Awards	2009	Michael Jackson	Sammy Davis Jr. Entertainer of the Year	Honoree	
Soul Train Music Awards	2014	"Love Never Felt So Good" (with Justin Timberlake)	Song of the Year	Nominated	
Soul Train Music Awards	2014	"Love Never Felt So Good" (with Justin Timberlake)	Best Collaboration	Nominated	
Soul Train Music Awards	2014	"Xscape"	Album of the Year	Nominated	
Stinkers Bad Movie Awards	2002	Michael Jackson (for Men in Black II)	Most Distracting Celebrity Cameo Appearance	Won	
Teen Choice Awards	2010	This Is It	Choice Movie: Dance	Nominated	
Telegatto Awards	1983	Michael Jackson	Artist of the Year	Won	
TMF Awards (Netherlands)	1996	Michael Jackson	Best International Singer	Won	
TMF Awards (Netherlands)	1996	"Earth Song"	Best International Video Clip	Won	
TMF Awards (Netherlands)	1997	Michael Jackson	Best International Singer	Won	
TMF Awards (Netherlands)	1997	Michael Jackson	Best Live Act	Won	
TV Land Awards	2007	Motown 25: Yesterday, Today Forever	Television's Greatest Music Moment	Nominated	
TVZ Awards	1996	"Scream"	Best International Music Video	Won	
TVZ Awards	1997	"Blood on the Dance Floor"	Best International Music Video	Won	
UK Music Hall of Fame	2004	Michael Jackson	UK Music Hall of Fame induction	Won	
United Negro College Fund	1988	Michael Jackson	Frederick Patterson Award	Honoree	
Video Software Dealer Association	1989	Moonwalker	Favorite Music Video	Won	
Virgin Media Music Awards	2010	Michael Jackson	Legend of the Year	Won	
VH1 Honors	1995	Michael Jackson	International Humanitarian Award	Honoree	
Webby Awards	2012	Behind The Mask	Online Film & Video/Best Editing (Note: Since this award came after Jackson's death, the award did not go directly to him so it won't count to his awards tally.)	Won	
World Awards	2002	Michael Jackson	World Arts Award 2002	Honoree	
World Music Awards
World Music Awards	1993	Michael Jackson	Best Selling U.S. Artist of the Year	Won	
World Music Awards	1993	Michael Jackson	World's Best Selling Pop Artist	Won	
World Music Awards	1993	Michael Jackson	Legend Award (World's Best Selling Artist of the Era)	Honoree	
World Music Awards	1996	Michael Jackson	Best Selling Male Artist	Won	
World Music Awards	1996	Michael Jackson	Best Selling American Artist	Won	
World Music Awards	1996	Michael Jackson	Best Selling R&B Artist	Won	
World Music Awards	1996	Michael Jackson	Best Selling Artist Ever	Honoree	
World Music Awards	1996	Thriller	Best Selling Record of All Time	Honoree	
World Music Awards	2000	Michael Jackson	Best Selling Male Artist of the Millennium	Honoree	
World Music Awards	2006	Michael Jackson	Chopard Diamond Award	Honoree	
World Music Awards	2008	Michael Jackson	World's Best Selling Pop/Rock Male Artist	Nominated	
World Music Video Awards (Note: According to Music & Media, it was an award organized by the International Federation of Music Television Channels and sponsored by Coca-Cola, later by Pepsi.)	1989	"Dirty Diana"	Viewers Choice #1 Video	Won	
World Music Video Awards	1989	Michael Jackson	Philips Hall of Fame induction	Honoree	

== Guinness World Records ==
The Guinness World Records is a reference book published annually, containing a collection of world records, both human achievements and the extremes of the natural world.

The Guinness World Records, originally known as the Guinness Book of World Records, are not referred to as "awards" but as records that a person holds until it is broken by another person. Jackson currently holds 26 Guinness World Records out of a total of 36 records set in his lifetime, including best-selling album of all time and most expensive music video.

Year	Nominee / work	Award	Result
1984	Thriller	Best-selling album of all time	Record
1984	Michael Jackson	Most Grammy wins in one night	Record
1986	Michael Jackson	Highest-paid commercial spokesperson (Note: In 1986, Jackson netted a deal with Pepsi worth between $12-15 million. It was once held as the most successful payout for a commercial spokesperson until the mid-to-late 1990s and early 2000s when superstars such as Britney Spears, Beyoncé and 50 Cent began to make upwards of $50 million off commercial endorsements. Jackson's record is broken.)	Eliminated
1988	Bad at Wembley Stadium	Most successful concert series (Note: Jackson's all-time Wembley record of 504,000 in 1988 was outdone in 2011 by the singing group Take That, who performed at Wembley Stadium for eight consecutive nights performing in front of a record 623,737 people, plus during Jackson's tour, he performed five consecutive nights on July 14, 15, 16, 22, and 23, then after stops in Wales, Ireland, Spain, France and Germany, he returned to Wembley for the last two nights on August 26 and 27, 1988.)	Eliminated
1988	Bad	Highest-grossing tour by a male solo artist (Note: Jackson possibly held this record until Justin Timberlake's FutureSex/LoveShow in 2006 when the tour grossed over $126.8 million worldwide, topping the $125 million set by Jackson in 1989. Since then, other male solo artists such as Roger Waters, Justin Bieber, Billy Joel, Paul McCartney and Bruno Mars have had tours that have grossed more money than Jackson did. The record has since been claimed by Ed Sheeran, who leads among all solo artists and artists in general with his ÷ Tour in 2019.)	Eliminated
1990	Michael Jackson's Moonwalker	First beat-'em-up videogame to use dance tactics	Record
1990	Michael Jackson	Highest fees for an entertainer	Eliminated
1996	"Scream" (Shared with Janet Jackson)	Most expensive music video	Record
1997	Thriller	Best-selling album by a male soloist in the UK	Record
1999	Michael Jackson and Janet Jackson	Most successful siblings	Record
1999	Michael Jackson	Youngest vocalist to top the US singles chart (Note: Though he was listed in Guinness' book as the youngest chart-topper in 1999, in recent years, this was corrected to Stevie Wonder, who as a solo artist, first topped the charts with "Fingertips" in 1963 when he was just 13. Jackson's first solo chart-topper, "Ben", hit number one in October 1972, two months after he turned 14.)	Eliminated
2000	Michael Jackson	Most charities supported by a pop star	Record
2000	Michael Jackson	Longest span of No. 1 hits by an R&B artist (Note: This record is likely now broken by Mariah Carey, who like Jackson, also records R&B music, as well as pop. Her recent number one was "All I Want for Christmas is You", which topped the Billboard Hot 100, on December 21, 2019. Jackson's span lasted 22 years and 19 days between "Ben" on October 14, 1972 and "You Are Not Alone" on September 2, 1995. Mariah's span is longer at 29 years and 139 days.)	Eliminated
2002	Ghosts	Longest music video (Note: The record now belongs to Twenty One Pilots' "Level of Concern".)	Eliminated
2002	Making Michael Jackson's Thriller	Best-selling music video	Record
2006	"You Are Not Alone"	First vocalist to enter the US single chart at No. 1	Record
2006	Michael Jackson	Most hit songs on UK Singles chart in one calendar year	Record
2009	Michael Jackson	Most simultaneous charted singles in the UK charts in a year	Record
2009	Michael Jackson	Most American Music Awards won by a male artist (Note: Although Guinness World Records mentioned 26 wins, according to the American Music Awards' database, he is only credited with 24.)	Record
2010	Michael Jackson	Highest-earning deceased artist	Record
2010	Michael Jackson	Most searched for – male (Note: Jackson lost his record to Eminem and R. Kelly.)	Eliminated
2010	Michael Jackson	Most lucrative recording contract	Record
2011	Michael Jackson's This Is It	Highest-grossing documentary film at the global box office	Record
2011	Michael Jackson	Longest span of US top 40 singles (Note: The record has been surpassed by Brenda Lee, whose chart span has spanned 64 years.)	Eliminated
2014	Michael Jackson	Best-selling game affiliated to a music artist	Record
2015	"Black or White"	Largest TV audience for a video premiere (Note: It's been reported that the estimated audience was 500 million worldwide in 27 countries though the number is just an estimate.)	Record
2016	Michael Jackson	Highest annual earnings for a celebrity ever	Record
2016	Michael Jackson	Highest-earning dead celebrity	Record
2016	Michael Jackson	Most Viewed Wikipedia Page for a musician	Record
2016	Michael Jackson	Most Viewed Wikipedia Page for a musician (Male)	Record
2017	Thriller	Best-selling album (Canada)	Record
2017	Michael Jackson	Most Billboard Music Awards won	Eliminated
2021	Michael Jackson's Thriller	Best-selling album in the US by a solo artist	Record
2022	Thriller	Best-selling album (Mexico)	Record
2023	Michael Jackson	Highest-earning dead celebrity (current)	Record
2023	Michael Jackson	Highest-earning dead celebrity (male, current)	Record

== Listicles ==
Name of publisher, name of listicle, year(s) listed, and placement result
Publisher	Listicle	Year(s)	Nominee / work	Result	Ref.
TheTopTens	Most Famous People of all Time	2024	Michael Jackson	#2	
Billboard	Best Pop Song of all time	2023	Billie Jean	won	
Billboard	Best Super Bowl Halftime Show of all time	2023	Michael Jackson	won	
Billboard	Best Song to debut at #1 on the Hot 100	2020	You Are Not Alone	won	
Billboard	Greatest Music Video of All Time	2016	Thriller (song), You Rock My World, Scream	#1, #2, #3	
Billboard	Greatest Artist of all time	2019	Michael Jackson	won	
WIBG-FM	Most Famous People of all Time	2022	Michael Jackson	#3	
Smooth Radio	Greatest Artists of all time	2024	Michael Jackson	#3	
Smooth Radio	Greatest Artists of all time	2023	Michael Jackson	#2	
Smooth Radio	Greatest Artists of all time	2022	Michael Jackson	won	
Smooth Radio	Greatest Artists of all time	2021	Michael Jackson	won	
Smooth Radio	Greatest Artists of all time	2020	Michael Jackson	won	
Sydney Morning Herald	Most Influential People of all time	2014	Michael Jackson	#4	
Biography.com	Favorite People in history	2014	Michael Jackson	won	
National Institute of Health	Most Influential People of all time	2013	Michael Jackson	#1	
TalkTalk Group	Most Famous People of all time	2010	Michael Jackson	won	
NME Magazine	Greatest Singers Of All Time	2011	Michael Jackson	#1	
NME Magazine	100 Greatest Music Videos	2011	Billie Jean	#100	
NME Magazine	50 Greatest Guitar Solos	2011	Beat It	#17	
NME Magazine	100 Best Songs of The 80's	2011	Billie Jean	#18	
NME Magazine	100 Best Songs of The 70's	2011	Don't Stop 'Til You Get Enough	#9	
NME Magazine	25 Stunning Live Collaborations	2011	Michael Jackson & Slash 1995 MTV Video Music Awards	Won	
NME Magazine	20 best pop acts of all time	2011	Michael Jackson	#3	
NME Magazine	50 fastest-selling albums ever	2011	(Bad)	#11	
NME Magazine	Legendary Gigs	2011	Bad World Tour 1988 at Wembley Stadium	Won	
VH1	100 Greatest Rock n' Roll Artists of All Time	1998	Michael Jackson	#40	
VH1	100 Greatest Rock n' Roll Moments On TV	1998	Michael Jackson's Pepsi Commercial	#63	
VH1	100 Greatest Rock n' Roll Moments On TV	1998	Black Or White	#47	
VH1	100 Greatest Rock n' Roll Moments On TV	1998	Michael Jackson Primetime Interview With Diane Sawyer	#40	
VH1	100 Greatest Rock n' Roll Moments On TV	1998	Thriller Worldwide Preimer On MTV	#11	
VH1	100 Greatest Rock n' Roll Moments On TV	1998	Michael Jackson Performs The Moonwalk In 1983	#5	
VH1	100 Greatest Artists Albums	2001	Thriller	#23	
VH1	100 Greatest Albums	2001	Off the Wall	#36	
VH1	100 Greatest Music Videos	2001	Thriller	#1	
VH1	100 Greatest Music Videos	2001	Scream	#9	
VH1	100 Greatest Music Videos	2001	Beat It	#21	
VH1	100 Greatest Music Videos	2001	Billie Jean	#34	
VH1	100 Greatest Music Videos	2001	Black Or White	#38	
VH1	200 Greatest Pop Culture Icons	2003	Michael Jackson	#10	
VH1	100 Greatest Dance Songs	2003	Don't Stop 'Til You Get Enough	#16	
VH1	100 Greatest Dance Songs	2003	Billie Jean	#28	
VH1	100 Greatest Songs of the Past 25 Years	2003	Billie Jean	#2	
VH1	100 Greatest Songs of the Past 25 Years	2003	Beat It	#40	
VH1	100 Greatest Moments That Rocked TV	2003	Thriller Premiers On TV	#9	
VH1	100 Greatest Moments That Rocked TV	2003	Michael Jackson debuts The Moonwalk on Motown 25	#2	
VH1	100 Greatest Moments That Rocked TV	2003	Michael Jackson lends his voice to The Simpsons	#9	
VH1	100 Greatest Songs of the 80's	2006	Billie Jean	#4	
VH1	100 Greatest Songs of the 80's	2006	Beat It	#21	
VH1	100 Most Shocking Music Moments	2009	Michael Jackson Dangles Baby	#59	
VH1	100 Most Shocking Music Moments	2009	Michael Jackson 2005 trial	#30	
VH1	100 Most Shocking Music Moments	2009	Death of Michael Jackson	#1	
VH1	100 Greatest Albums of All Time of the MTV Generation	2009	Bad	#43	
VH1	100 Greatest Artists of All Time	2011	Michael Jackson	#2	

== Decorations ==
=== From Gabon ===
Officer of the National Order of Merit

In 1992, during a visit to Gabon, Michael became the first (and only) entertainer to receive the National Order of Merit from President Omar Bongo.

== Keys to the City ==
- September 18, 1987: Osaka, Japan. During a break from performing in Osaka, as part of the Bad world tour, Jackson was awarded the Key to the City by Mayor Yasushi Oshima.
- (United States) April 21, 1988: Chicago, Illinois. Upon performing three sold-out concerts at the Metropolitan Chicago's Rosemont Horizon in April 1988, Jackson received the Key to the City from Mayor Eugene Sawyer, who cited the entertainer for his onstage performance and humanitarian philanthropy. Jackson shared his honor backstage with internationally renowned singer, dancer, and actress Lola Falana, who was also waging a courageous battle against multiple sclerosis.
- May 26, 1997: Warsaw, Poland. Although Jackson's visit was in 1997, it followed his 1996 HIStory World Tour concert in Warsaw. His return trip was prompted by a desire to explore business investments and cultural ties. During his return trip, Jackson met with Mayor Marcin Swiecicki and signed a letter committing to develop a family entertainment center. While the theme park ultimately never materialized, the signing ceremony at City Hall was where he was presented with keys to the city. Jackson's visit also included meeting with President Aleksander Kwaśniewski, exploring the city, and visiting an orphanage.
- (United States) June 11, 2003: Gary, Indiana. Michael Jackson received the Key to the City of Gary from Mayor Scott King.
- (United States) October 25, 2003: Las Vegas, Nevada. Jackson was given the Key to the City of Las Vegas from Mayor Oscar Goodman; the mayor also made the date "Michael Jackson Day".
- (United States) June 15, 2018: Detroit, Michigan. Jackson was posthumously awarded the Key to the City of Detroit during the Detroit Music Weekend 2018.

== Royal titles and styles ==
=== Africa ===
Kingdom of Sanwi

- 1992 – 2009: King Sani Nanan Amalaman Anoh, High Prince of the Agni people.

In a high-profile visit to Africa, in 1992 Jackson visited several countries, among them Gabon and Egypt. In his trip to Côte d'Ivoire, Jackson was crowned "King Sani" by the king of the Sanwi, a kingdom of the Agni people. He then signed official documents formalizing his chieftaincy, sat on a golden throne under the sacred Krindja tree, and presided over ceremonial dances. He held the title up until his death. Jesse Jackson was later created the High Prince of the Agni people of Côte d'Ivoire following Michael Jackson's death.

== Other honors ==
- In December 1984, Jackson was voted "Hero Of Young America" in a poll of 4,000 teenagers by The World Almanac and Book of Facts.
- On November 20, 1984, with the installation of Star No. 1,793 of the Hollywood Walk of Fame in front of Grauman's Chinese Theatre, Jackson became the first celebrity to have two stars in the same category, having received one as a member of The Jacksons in 1980.
- During the 1984 Summer Olympics, the Jackson family was given the Medal of Friendship Award.
- In 1984, the NAACP announced that Michael Jackson and his brothers were named honorary co-chairmen of the civil rights organization's National Voter Registration Drive. Registration booths were set up outside Arrowhead Stadium in Kansas City, Missouri, the venue of his Victory tour's opening concert on July 4.
- In 1984, the Brotman Medical Center, which treated Jackson for second and third-degree burns on his scalp following a pyrotechnic incident while filming a Pepsi commercial, renamed their burn center to the Michael Jackson Burn Center, and gave him a plaque called the Michael Jackson Burn Center Plaque, in honor of the singer.
- In 1985, stamps featuring Michael Jackson were printed in the British Virgin Islands.
- Jackson was included in TIME Magazine's All-TIME 100 Fashion Icons list in 2012.
- Michael Jackson is the second most sculpted of all the Madame Tussauds wax figures, with a total of 19 pieces in their museums around the world. Only Queen Elizabeth II has been portrayed more often.
- Mesoparapylocheles michaeljacksoni, an extinct hermit crab which existed during the Albian or Cenomanian age in what is now Spain, is named after Jackson.
- A crater on the Moon, previously known as Posidonius J (located on the Lake of Dreams), has been renamed after Jackson by the Lunar Republic Society.
- In 1998, Daikaku Chodoin (the founder and president of the United World Karate Association) presented Jackson with the Honorary Chairmanship of the United World Karate Association and a godan (fifth degree) black belt.
- Michael Jackson was made an honorary member of the New Westminster Police Department in 1984 while in British Columbia, Canada. On November 19, appointed police constable "PC 49", he promised to "serve the Queen and cause the peace to be kept and preserved".
- On June 20, 1988, Michael Jackson arrives in Paris, France, P.R.-ist Bob Jones and bodyguard Wayne Nagin. The city's mayor at the time, Jacques Chirac, honoured Jackson the Grand Vermeil Medal of the City of Paris, equivalent to the Keys to the City.
- On July 22, 1988, Disney characters, Mickey Mouse and Donald Duck, present an elated star with a pair of specially engraved ice skates backstage before his concert in Wembley, England.
- In 1988, his autobiography, "Moonwalk", makes The New York Times' publication Best Seller List as the number 1 Best Seller of the year.
- In 1989, Michael Jackson's former elementary school, the Gardner Street Elementary in Los Angeles, designated its school auditorium the "Michael Jackson Auditorium". Mr. Jackson appeared at the ceremony, in which the school children sang his hit song, "We Are the World". In 2003, after accusations of child molestation, the school chose to cover Jackson's name with plywood. The school board stated that the request had come from some parents who "felt more comfortable with it covered". Jackson's spokesperson stated that he wondered "what those parents will say when Mr. Jackson is exonerated". At the end of the trial Jackson was acquitted of all charges. Recently, following petitions and letters to City Council and the Gardner Street Elementary School superintendent and principal, the "Michael Jackson Auditorium" sign has been uncovered. Jackson was named Most Famous Alumnus of Gardner Street Elementary School, in Hollywood, California and the school auditorium was renamed for him in 1989.
- On February 23, 1995, Michael gave a special preview of some of the songs off his forthcoming album HIStory to the National Association of Recording Merchandisers. The NARM presented him with the Harold Chapin Humanitarian Award at the preview.
- In 1997, Michael Jackson was named the most famous person of all time in a global survey.
- In 1999, Michael Jackson was voted the greatest artist of the Millennium in a CNN survey, beating out Pablo Picasso, Leonardo da Vinci, Vincent Van Gogh and Ludwig van Beethoven.
- In 2002 Michael Jackson was presented with the 30th Anniversary Award by its designer, Nijel, who also designed the Top Selling Artist Of The Decade Award in 1990. The award was given by the fans, celebrating him being on stage for 30 years. Fans all over the world donated money to contribute for the award to being created.
- In 2007, Jackson visited the United States Army base south of Tokyo and was commemorated with a letter of appreciation from the Colonel.
- On Australia Day 2012, Jackson was honored by being immortalized at the Grauman's Chinese Theater by his children, Prince, Paris and Blanket Jackson. Among many other celebrities there to pay tribute to him were Quincy Jones, Chris Tucker, Smokey Robinson, Justin Bieber with performances made by the Glee cast and Cirque Du Soliel and many other.
- Michael Jackson Award Belt - Versace black leather belt with gold hardware belt buckles adorned with colorful gemstones in the amount of 4 million with fluer de lis ornament pattern. belt inscribed "Presented to Michael Jackson from Sony Music UK 1992" and is contained in custom wood and container plaxiglass.
- Precious metal gold microphone on a burl walnut plaque reading "Presented to Michael Jackson by The Prince's Trust in recognition of outstanding support it".
- Shadow box display in the style of Jackson's album Dangerous in 1991. Award plaque reads in full "triple platinum record awarded to Michael Jackson for sale in Switzerland more than 150,000 units of Sony Music Entertainment AG Dangerous."
- In 1997, Jackson was awarded a Diamond Award and was named one of the princes of Africa in a prestigious ceremony with various high-profile political leaders of Africa.
- In 1989 Rock Over Europe Awards awarded Jackson with the Children of the world music video award.
- 1989 - CEBA (Creative Excellence in Business Advertising) awards the plaque reading "Motown On Showtime" presented to "Michael Jackson The Legend Continues" Michael Jackson, Co-Executive Producer, 1989.
- Small metal banded glass balls topped with a crown design metal reading "Germany Music Servat Mundum 1992" commemorating "MJ King of Music".
- Silver goblets mounted to a marble base with a plaque reading in full "Michael Jackson Superstar of The Century -. Magazine "
- Lucite award reads "Rock" with the text printed on the base reads in full "The Children of the world video awards 1989 Rock IM & MC Over Europe."
- Player awards metal sculpture in the style of Rodin's The Thinker. A metal plaque on the front reads in full "World of Art Award 2002 World Michael Jackson presented by President Mikhail S. Gorbachev ".
- Piece curve patinaed black metal to make it look like a piece of paper resting on a cushion of black velvet and faux pearls lined presentation. The award reads in full "Michael Jackson / The Power of Music / is the strength of Soul./VH1 Honors / The Musicians Who Goes / Share Beyond / Soul and Share Time / Energy and Resources / For Help Others/Vh1 Honors / June 22, 1995 "

== See also ==
- List of Michael Jackson records and achievements
- Grammy Award milestones
- Honorific nicknames in popular music
- The Greatest American
- Michael Jackson Video Vanguard Award

== Sources ==
- Campbell, Lisa (1993). Michael Jackson: The King of Pop. Branden. ISBN 0-8283-1957-X.
- George, Nelson (2004). Michael Jackson: The Ultimate Collection booklet. Sony BMG.
- Guinness World Records (2001). Guinness World Records 2002. Guinness. ISBN 0-553-58378-6.
- Guinness World Records (2005). Guinness World Records 2006. Guinness. ISBN 1-904994-02-4.
- Thriller 25: The Book. ML Publishing Group. 2008. ISBN 978-0-9768891-9-9.
- Taraborrelli, J. Randy (2004). The Magic and the Madness. Terra Alta, WV: Headline. ISBN 0-330-42005-4.
