= Dick Clark Productions =

American television production company

Dick Clark Productions, LLC
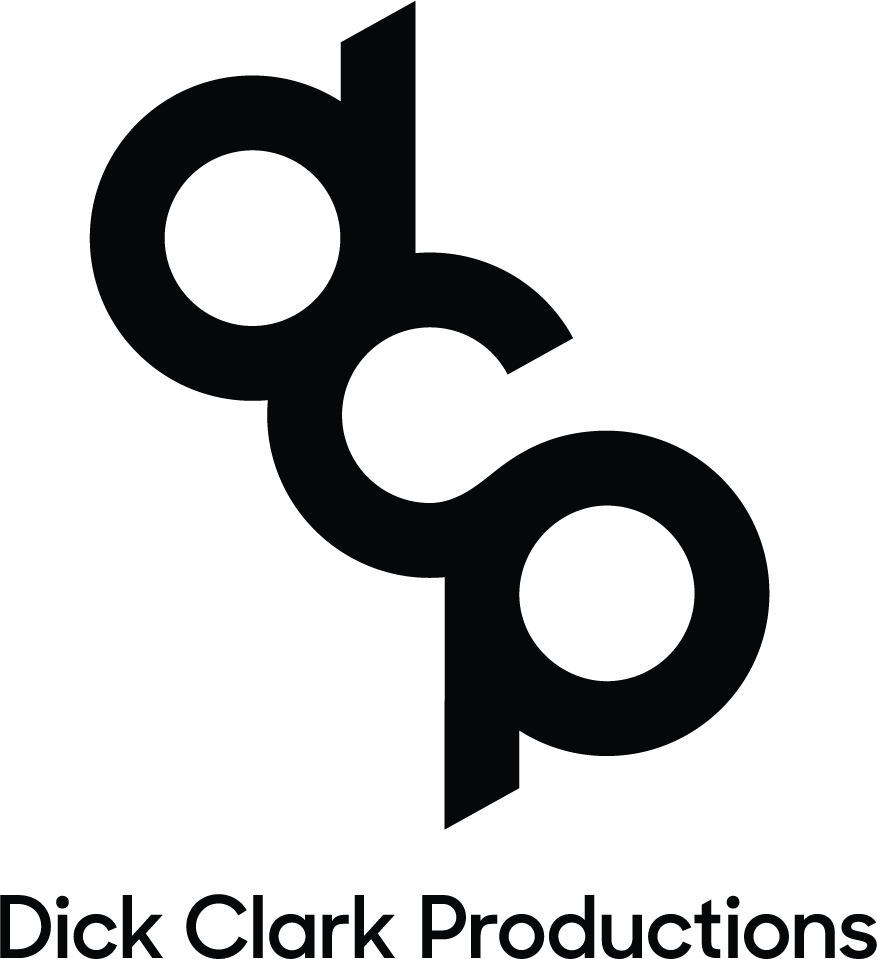
- Type: Private
- Traded as: Nasdaq: DCP (1986-2002)
- Industry: Television production
- Founded: 1957; 69 years ago in Philadelphia, Pennsylvania, United States
- Founder: Dick Clark
- Headquarters: Beverly Hills, California, United States
- Owners: Eldridge Industries; Penske Media Corporation
- Parent: Penske Media Eldridge
- Website: dickclark.com

Dick Clark Productions, LLC (DCP, historically stylized in lowercase as dick clark productions or dcp) is an American multinational television production company founded by radio and television host Dick Clark.

The studio primarily produces award shows and other music entertainment programs, including the Golden Globe Awards (owned outright by DCP since 2023), Academy of Country Music Awards, the DCP-created American Music Awards, the Billboard Music Awards (presented by co-owned music magazine Billboard), Dick Clark's New Year's Rockin' Eve, So You Think You Can Dance (with 19 Entertainment), American Bandstand and TV's Bloopers & Practical Jokes (initially with Carson Entertainment).

The company was sold to a group led by Daniel Snyder in 2007 for $150 million. In September 2012, it was sold again to Guggenheim Partners, Mandalay Entertainment and Mosaic Media Investment Partners for $350 million. Guggenheim's stake was later spun out to former president Todd Boehly. In 2016, Chinese conglomerate Wanda Group announced its intent to acquire DCP, but the deal was thrown out in early 2017 due to regulatory issues. The company then became a part of MRC (initially Valence Media) after Boehly's entertainment and media assets merged with the studio.

Valence as a whole rebranded as MRC in 2020, with DCP being part of the MRC Live & Alternative division. In September 2021, MRC discontinued the Dick Clark Productions branding, and folded all of its productions under the MRC Live & Alternative branding going forward. In August 2022, the merger was unwound, with Eldridge re-gaining control of the studio and reinstating the Dick Clark Productions name. In January 2023, DCP was subsequently acquired by a joint venture of Penske Media Corporation and Eldridge known as Penske Media Eldridge.

== History ==
=== 1950s–1980s: Founding and early history ===
The Dick Clark radio show began syndication in the late 1950s as part of MARS Broadcasting. The name and lower-case stylization of Dick Clark Productions dates back to, at latest, 1964, when Dick Clark's public relations manager, Henry Rogers of Rogers & Cowan, suggested naming his production company after himself, so he could be more visible following American Bandstand's move to Hollywood. Later, Clark rented a building on the Sunset Strip, in an area among clubs and landmarks. As Clark recounted in his 1976 book, Rock, Roll and Remember: "I hung up a very modest sign in lowercase print — dick clark productions — and started producing."

In the 1970s, it operated a subsidiary Dick Clark Teleshows, to produce, most notably, the first American Music Awards, Sorority '62, and the 90-minute special 200 Years of American Music. Between the 1970s and 1980s, Dick Clark Productions owned a cinema production company, Dick Clark Cinema Productions, to produce telemovies and feature films. In 1983, Daniel Paulson was appointed vice president of the division.

In 1983, a company owned by Clark and his wife were among multiple applicants to acquire WRKS-FM in New York City. From 1984 to 1987, the company produced the Black Gold Awards, a music awards program recognizing Black recording artists, producers, and performers. Also, in 1985, Clark operated a home video division, Dick Clark Video, to handle videocassettes, with Vestron Video handling distribution of the titles, most notably American Bandstand. Around the time, in early 1983, Dick Clark Productions entered into a partnership with Bob Stewart Productions and Syndicast Services to develop a 90-minute game show block consisting of revivals of old Bob Stewart-owned properties Eye Guess, Three on a Match and Chain Reaction, and attempted to delay to 1984-1985, but none of which got into the ground. Also Stewart and Clark co-produced a television special You Are the Jury for NBC in late 1984, which was evolved into the syndicated court show Trial by Jury in 1989.

In 1987, Dick Clark Productions had signed a five-year deal with the Golden Globe Awards to produce the telecasts from the next five years.

=== 2002–2023: Ownership changes ===
Dick Clark Productions went public on NASDAQ in 1986. It was later taken private in 2002 by an investment group that included Mosaic Media Group and the Caisse. Mandalay Entertainment bought DCP's stake in 2004.

On June 19, 2007, Dick Clark Productions was sold to Daniel Snyder, owner of the then-Washington Redskins, and former chairman of Six Flags, for $175 million. After Clark's death on April 18, 2012, Snyder commented that he was proud when he purchased Dick Clark Productions, adding that Clark was "in every sense of the word, a giant". Until 2012, Dick Clark Productions was majority owned by Red Zone Capital Management, a Daniel Snyder-controlled private equity firm, with a 40 percent stake held by Six Flags. The week of June 13, 2012, Red Zone confirmed a possible sale of the company, and that investment bank Raine Group had been tapped to determine possible suitors. Rumored suitors included CORE Media Group, whose 19 Entertainment produced So You Think You Can Dance with DCP, and Ryan Seacrest Productions, whose namesake founder worked with and was mentored by Dick Clark.

On September 4, 2012, Red Zone Capital Management reached an agreement to sell Dick Clark Productions to a group partnership headed by Guggenheim Partners, Mandalay Entertainment, and Mosaic Media Investment Partners for approximately $350 million. In December 2012, reports by several baseball insiders indicated that the Los Angeles Dodgers (also owned by Guggenheim Partners) were in talks with Dick Clark Productions to potentially form a regional sports network for the team once its contract with Fox Sports West concluded. The Dodgers instead partnered with Time Warner Cable to launch Time Warner Cable SportsNet LA.

On October 2, 2013, Dick Clark Productions established a joint venture with Israeli broadcaster Keshet known as Keshet DCP, which would develop adaptations of its unscripted formats for the U.S. market; its first production would be an American version of its talent show Rising Star, which was ordered to series by ABC the following month.

In 2014, DCP took over production of the Billboard Music Awards, an awards show presented by Guggenheim-owned Billboard magazine. In July 2014, DCP settled a lawsuit with the Hollywood Foreign Press Association over its contracts with NBC to broadcast the Golden Globe Awards.

On December 17, 2015, in response to losses across Guggenheim Partners, the company announced that it would spin out its media properties, including Dick Clark Productions, to a group led by its former president Todd Boehly. Variety reported that CEO Allen Shapiro was "likely to be a key player in the spinoff, given his experience in running entertainment firms". Boehly's stake is represented by Eldridge Industries.

In September 2016, it was reported that the Chinese conglomerate Wanda Group (which owns AMC Theatres and Legendary Entertainment) was in talks to acquire Dick Clark Productions. This was confirmed on November 4, 2016, when Wanda Group announced the purchase for $1 billion. On February 20, 2017, Bloomberg News reported that the sale was facing regulatory issues in China. On March 10, 2017, an Eldridge Industries spokesperson stated that the sale had been scrapped. DCP received $50 million from Wanda Group in breakup and extension fees. The studio later sold Chinese rights to the Golden Globes and New Year's Rockin' Eve to STX Entertainment.

On February 1, 2018, DCP merged with Billboard-Hollywood Reporter Media Group and Media Rights Capital to form Valence Media. Mike Mahan was appointed CEO of DCP. In November 2019, the company's COO and CFO Amy Thurlow became president of Dick Clark Productions, with Mike Mahan expected to become a vice chairman in 2020. In July 2020, Valence was rebranded as MRC, with Dick Clark Productions operating as a label of its non-scripted division MRC Live & Alternative.

Thurlow stepped down from DCP in June 2021. In September 2021, the Dick Clark Productions name was discontinued, with all of its productions now falling under the MRC Live & Alternative banner.

=== 2022–present: Penske Media Eldridge ownership ===
In August 2022, Eldridge and MRC's co-CEOs Modi Wiczyk and Asif Satchu agreed to divide the company's assets, effectively undoing the 2018 deal that created Valence Media. Among other assets, Eldridge re-acquired the MRC Live & Alternative division, and announced it would restore the Dick Clark Productions name. In January 2023, DCP was subsequently acquired by a joint venture of Penske Media Corporation and Eldridge Industries known as Penske Media Eldridge: Adam Stotsky stepped down as president of the company following the transaction, and at least 16 employees were laid off. The deal expands on an existing relationship between the companies, under which PMC operates Billboard and The Hollywood Reporter.

On June 12, 2023, DCP acquired the assets and intellectual property of the Golden Globe Awards from the Hollywood Foreign Press Association (–), as part of a transition to a for-profit entity undertaken by Boehly.

On August 3, 2026, Dick Clark Productions formed a new unit known as DCP Studios headed by former Vox Media creative head Yosef Johnson; the unit is intended to help DCP provide a "broader range of creative services", and serve as a producer of branded content for PMX Global properties.
