= List of Michael Jackson records and achievements =

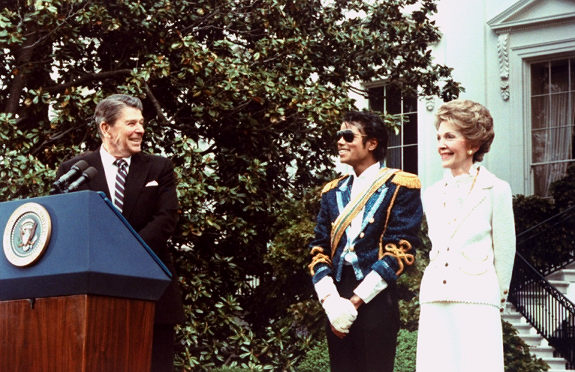
U.S. President Ronald Reagan presents Michael Jackson with an award for his work against drunk driving at a White House ceremony, 1984.

This article lists some of the sales and charts records and achievements of American singer Michael Jackson (1958–2009). Jackson's success during his peak in the 1980s and 1990s included a number of notable statistical accomplishments. He is the most awarded recording artist in the history of popular music and is recognized as the "Most Successful Entertainer of All Time" by Guinness World Records, selling over 500 million records around the world.

Data for U.S. sales comes largely from Billboard magazine and the Recording Industry Association of America (RIAA).

== Selected countries ==
=== US chart records and achievements ===
- Jackson (aged 11 years, 155 days or 11 years, 5 months, and 2 days) is the youngest vocalist ever to top the Hot 100. As part of the Jackson 5, he topped the charts with "I Want You Back" on the week of January 31, 1970.
- Jackson's Thriller (1982) remained at the top on the Billboard 200 album chart for thirty-seven weeks, setting a record for the longest run at number one by a studio album. It is one of only five albums to have sold more copies in the United States than any other in two separate years, topping the sales charts in 1983 and 1984.
- Thriller is currently the first best-selling album of all time in the United States and the second most certified album after the Eagles' Their Greatest Hits (1971-1975), with total units of 34 million sold to date.
- Jackson's Bad (1987) remained at top 5 on the Billboard 200 album chart for thirty-eight weeks, setting a record for the longest run at top five by an album from a male solo artist.
- In July 2009, three of Jackson's albums (Number Ones, The Essential Michael Jackson and Thriller) claimed the top three positions on Billboard's Top Pop Catalog Albums and Top Comprehensive Albums charts in the week following the singer's death. marking the first time any catalog album outsold the number one album on the Billboard 200. Additionally, eight of the top nine positions on Top Pop Catalog Albums were owned by Jackson, with a ninth held by a Jackson 5 hits collection. This made Jackson the only solo artist to achieve such feat.
- Jackson was the first artist to launch seven top ten singles off one album.
- Jackson's Bad is only one of two albums where five singles off one album topped the Billboard Hot 100.
- Jackson became the first recording artist to land number one singles in three decades after "Black or White" topped the Billboard Hot 100 in December 1991. His first number-one single, "Ben", topped the Billboard Hot 100 in October 1972.
- Jackson had more number-one singles than any other recording artist in the 1980s with nine singles.
- Jackson's "You Are Not Alone" made him the first artist to have a song debut atop the Billboard Hot 100 in September 1995.
- Jackson holds the record of longest span of number ones for a male act in the Billboard Hot 100 with a span of 25 years and seven months.
- Jackson has had 13 number-one singles on Billboard's Hot 100, making him the male artist with most No. 1 Hits in the Hot 100 era. Including Pre- Hot 100, Jackson follows Elvis Presley for the most number ones by a male artist and ranks fifth overall.
- Jackson has 30 top ten singles on the Billboard Hot 100, with Drake, Madonna, the Beatles, and Rihanna having more.
- Jackson held a record for the longest span of top forty singles on the Billboard Hot 100 in a span of 46 years and eight months, with his debuting solo single, "Got to Be There", entering the chart on November 6, 1971, and his posthumous duet with Drake, "Don't Matter to Me", first charting on July 14, 2018, which has since been broken by Elton John.
- Jackson is the only act to have top 10 hits on the Billboard Hot 100 across six consecutive decades (1970s–2020s) and seven consecutive decades including his work with the Jackson 5 (1960s–2020s) when "I Want You Back" charted at No. 8 on the week of December 27, 1969, in the Billboard Hot 100.
- At the 1984 Grammys, Thriller earned Michael 7 Grammy awards with Jackson winning an eighth for his contribution to the E.T. the Extra-Terrestrial soundtrack, the most won by an artist in a single year.
- Jackson currently holds the record for the most wins by a male artist at the American Music Awards with 26.

==== Jackson's US number ones ====
Michael Jackson had 13 number one hits on the Billboard Hot 100 charts.

- 1972: "Ben" (1 week)
- 1979: "Don't Stop 'Til You Get Enough" (1 week)
- 1980: "Rock with You" (4 weeks)
- 1983: "Billie Jean" (7 weeks)
- 1983: "Beat It" (3 weeks)
- 1983: "Say Say Say" (with Paul McCartney) (6 weeks)
- 1987: "I Just Can't Stop Loving You" (with Siedah Garrett) (1 week)
- 1987: "Bad" (2 weeks)
- 1987: "The Way You Make Me Feel" (1 week)
- 1988: "Man in the Mirror" (2 weeks)
- 1988: "Dirty Diana" (1 week)
- 1991: "Black or White" (7 weeks)
- 1995: "You Are Not Alone" (1 week)

==== Jackson's US Top 10 Hits ====
Michael Jackson had 28 Top 10 hits on the Billboard Hot 100 charts while living, and to date has two posthumous Top 10 entries.

- 1971: "Got to Be There" #4
- 1972: "Rockin' Robin" #2
- 1972: "Ben" #1
- 1979: "Don't Stop 'Til You Get Enough" #1
- 1980: "Rock with You" #1
- 1980: "Off The Wall" #10
- 1980: "She's Out of My Life" #10
- 1983: "The Girl Is Mine" (with Paul McCartney) #2
- 1983: "Billie Jean" #1
- 1983: "Beat It" #1
- 1983: "Wanna Be Startin' Somethin'" #5
- 1983: "Human Nature" #7
- 1983: "P.Y.T. (Pretty Young Thing)" #10
- 1983: "Say Say Say" (with Paul McCartney) #1
- 1984: "Thriller" #4
- 1987: "I Just Can't Stop Loving You" (with Siedah Garrett) #1
- 1987: "Bad" #1
- 1988: "The Way You Make Me Feel" #1
- 1988: "Man in the Mirror" #1
- 1988: "Dirty Diana" #1
- 1989: "Smooth Criminal" #7
- 1991: "Black or White" #1
- 1992: "Remember the Time" #3
- 1992: "In the Closet" #6
- 1993: "Will You Be There" #7
- 1995: "Scream" (with Janet Jackson) #5
- 1995: "You Are Not Alone" #1
- 2001: "You Rock My World" #10
- 2014: "Love Never Felt So Good" (with Justin Timberlake) #9
- 2018: "Don't Matter to Me" (with Drake) #9
- 2025: "Thriller" #10

==== Jackson's US R&B number ones ====
Michael Jackson had 13 number one hits on the Billboard R&B charts.

- 1979: "Don't Stop 'Til You Get Enough" (5 weeks)
- 1980: "Rock with you" (4 weeks)
- 1983: "The Girl Is Mine" (8 weeks)
- 1983: "Billie Jean" (9 weeks)
- 1983: "Beat It" (1 week)
- 1987: "I Just Can't Stop Loving You" (1 week)
- 1987: "Bad" (3 weeks)
- 1987: "The Way You Make Me Feel (4 weeks)
- 1988: "Man in the Mirror" (1 week)
- 1988: "Another Part of Me" (1 week)
- 1992: "Remember the Time" (2 weeks)
- 1992: "In the Closet" (1 week)
- 1995: "You Are Not Alone" (4 weeks)

=== UK chart records and achievements ===
- Jackson had the most Top 40 hits in the UK Singles Chart in one year, 19 in 2006. Each of the 19 songs was collectors' re-releases of previous Jackson hits, issued weekly as part of a 20-single promotion (the first of the singles was ineligible to chart due to its packaging). Of these singles, "Billie Jean" reached the highest position on the UK chart (#11), and "Jam" remained on the chart for the longest stretch (13 weeks).
- Jackson had 44 Top 10 hits in the UK Singles Chart. Elvis Presley has the most, with 77.
- Jackson's Thriller and Bad are the two highest-selling albums by a male solo artist in UK history. Besides Jackson, only Queen, with the 1st- and 7th-best-selling albums, has multiple entries in the top ten.
- Jackson is the only artist to have 3 albums (Thriller, Bad and Number Ones) certified 10× Platinum or more in the UK.
- Bad was the fastest-selling album in the UK with sales of 350,000 copies during the first week of its release (it is now the eleventh).
- In the second week following his death, Jackson had 13 songs in the UK Top 40, and 5 albums in the Top 10, including the top-selling album.
- Michael Jackson is the only artist in history to have a top 10 single in six consecutive decades besides Elton John.

==== Jackson's UK number ones ====
Michael Jackson had seven number one hits on the UK Singles Charts.

- 1981: "One Day in Your Life" (2 weeks)
- 1983: "Billie Jean" (1 week)
- 1987: "I Just Can't Stop Loving You" (with Siedah Garrett) (2 weeks)
- 1991: "Black or White" (2 weeks)
- 1995: "You Are Not Alone" (2 weeks)
- 1995: "Earth Song" (6 weeks)
- 1997: "Blood on the Dance Floor" (1 week)

=== French chart records and achievements ===
- Jackson had four diamond albums in France. They are Thriller, Bad, Dangerous, and HIStory.
- Jackson had 22 top ten hits on the French Top 100 Singles charts.
- Jackson had 36 top 40 hits on the Top 100 Singles charts.

==== Jackson's French number ones ====
Michael Jackson had eight number one hits on the Top 100 Singles charts.

- 1983: "Billie Jean" (3 weeks)
- 1983: "Say Say Say" (with Paul McCartney) (1 week)
- 1984: "Thriller" (3 weeks)
- 1991: "Black or White" (2 weeks)
- 1992: "Heal the World" (2 weeks)
- 1995: "You Are Not Alone" (1 week)
- 2001: "You Rock My World" (3 weeks)

=== Spanish chart records and achievements ===
- Jackson had 35 top 20 hits on the Top 20 Singles charts.
- Jackson had 29 top ten hits on the Top 20 Singles charts.

==== Jackson's Spanish number ones ====
Michael Jackson had 21 number one hits on the Top 20 Singles charts.

- 1983: "The Girl Is Mine" (with Paul McCartney) (3 weeks)
- 1983 & 2006: "Billie Jean" (2 weeks)
- 1983: "Say Say Say" (with Paul McCartney)(1 week)
- 1988 & 2006: "Smooth Criminal" (6 weeks)
- 1991: "Black or White" (11 weeks)
- 1995: "Scream" (with Janet Jackson) (4 weeks)
- 1996 & 2006: "Stranger in Moscow" (5 weeks)
- 1997 & 2006: "Blood on the Dance Floor" (7 weeks)
- 2001: "You Rock My World" (1 week)
- 2006: "Thriller" (2-week)
- 2006: "Rock with You" (1 week)
- 2006: "Beat It" (1 week)
- 2006: "Bad" (14 weeks)
- 2006: "The Way You Make Me Feel" (1 week)
- 2006: "Dirty Diana" (1 week)
- 2006: "Leave Me Alone" (1 week)
- 2006: "Jam" (1 week)
- 2006: "Heal the World" (1 week)
- 2006: "You Are Not Alone" (1 week)
- 2006: "Earth Song" (1 week)

=== Canadian chart records and achievements ===
- Jackson's Thriller is the highest-selling album in Canadian music history, the first and only album to obtain Triple Diamond certification.
- Jackson had five number-one albums in Canada: Thriller, Bad, HIStory, Number Ones and This Is It.
- Jackson had three singles that earned at least one platinum certification in Canada: "Billie Jean," "Beat It," and "Say Say Say."
- Jackson had 29 top 20 hits on the Top 50 Singles charts.
- Jackson had 20 top ten hits on the Top 50 Singles charts.

==== Jackson's Canadian number ones ====
Michael Jackson had five number-one hits on the Top 50 Singles charts.

- 1983: "Billie Jean" (7 weeks)
- 1983: "Beat It" (2 weeks)
- 1984: "Say Say Say" (with Paul McCartney) (1 week)
- 1987: "Bad" (1 week)
- 1991: "Black or White" (8 weeks)

=== Australian chart records and achievements ===
- Jackson had eight albums in Australia that earned platinum or multi-platinum certifications: Off the Wall, Thriller, Bad, Dangerous, HIStory, Invincible, Number Ones, and The Essential Michael Jackson.
- Jackson had 27 top 20 hits on the Top 100 Singles charts.
- Jackson had 20 top ten hits on the Top 100 Singles charts.

==== Jackson's Australian number ones ====
Michael Jackson had four number one hits on the Top 100 Singles charts.

- 1972: "Ben" (8 weeks)
- 1979: "Don't Stop 'Til You Get Enough" (3 weeks)
- 1983: "Billie Jean" (5 weeks)
- 1985: "We Are The World"
- 1991: "Black or White" (8 weeks)

=== Norwegian chart records and achievements ===
- Jackson had three singles that earned a gold certification in Norway: "Earth Song," "They Don't Care About Us," and "You Rock My World."
- Jackson had 21 top ten hits on the Top 20 Singles charts.

==== Jackson's Norwegian number ones ====
Michael Jackson had five number one hits on the Top 20 Singles charts.

- 1979: "Don't Stop 'Til You Get Enough" (2 weeks)
- 1983: "Say Say Say" (5 weeks)
- 1987: "I Just Can't Stop Loving You" (with Siedah Garrett) (7 weeks)
- 1991: "Black or White" (6 weeks)

=== Swiss chart records and achievements ===
- Jackson had 24 top ten hits on the Top 100 Singles chart.
- Jackson had 21 top ten hits on the Top 20 Singles charts.

==== Jackson's Swiss number ones ====
Michael Jackson had four number one hits on the Top 100 Singles charts.

- 1983: "Billie Jean" (7 weeks)
- 1991: "Black or White" (6 weeks)
- 1995: "Earth Song" (4 weeks)
- 1995: "You Are Not Alone" (3 weeks)

=== New Zealand chart records and achievements ===
- Jackson had 24 top ten hits on the Top 100 Singles charts.

==== Jackson's New Zealand number ones ====
Michael Jackson had eight number one hits on the Top 100 Singles charts.

- 1979: "Don't Stop Til You Get Enough" (5 weeks)
- 1983: "Beat It" (5 weeks)
- 1991: "Black or White" (5 weeks)
- 1991: "Remember the Time" (2 weeks)
- 1993: "Give In to Me" (4 weeks)
- 1995: "You Are Not Alone" (3 weeks)
- 1995: "Scream" (with Janet Jackson) (4 weeks)
- 1997: "Blood on the Dance Floor" (1 week)

=== Irish chart records and achievements ===
- Jackson had 70 chart entries on the Top 100 Singles charts.

==== Jackson's Irish number ones ====
Michael Jackson had 10 number one hits on the Top 100 Singles charts, more than any other solo artist.

- 1981: "One Day in Your Life"
- 1983: "Billie Jean" (7 weeks)
- 1985: "We Are the World"
- 1987: "I Just Can't Stop Loving You" (with Siedah Garrett)
- 1987: "Bad"
- 1987: "The Way You Make Me Feel" (1 week)
- 1989: "Leave Me Alone"
- 1989: "Liberian Girl" (1 week)
- 1991: "Black or White" (3 weeks)
- 1995: "You Are Not Alone" (4 weeks)

=== Argentina chart records and achievements ===
- Thriller is the best-selling English-language album in Argentina based on CAPIF certification.

=== Austria chart records and achievements ===
- Thriller is the best-selling album of all time in Austria, based on IFPI.

=== China chart records and achievements ===
- Bad is the third best-selling English-language album in China, after The Lion King and Titanic soundtracks.
- It is the best-selling English language album released by a musical artist based on IFPI.

=== Denmark chart records and achievements ===
- Thriller is the second best-selling English language album in Denmark, after ABBA Gold.

=== Indonesia chart records and achievements ===
- Dangerous is the second best-selling English-language album in Indonesia, after Westlife.

=== Israel chart records and achievements ===
- Thriller is the best-selling English-language album in Israel.

=== Mexico chart records and achievements ===
- As of 2022, Thriller is the best-selling album of all time in Mexico based on certifications by AMPROFON.

=== Netherlands chart records and achievements ===
- Thriller is the best-selling album of all time in the Netherlands.

=== Singapore chart records and achievements ===
- Dangerous is the best-selling album of all time in Singapore.

=== Sweden chart records and achievements ===
- Thriller is the best-selling album from the United States in Sweden.

=== Switzerland chart records and achievements ===
- Thriller is the best-selling album from the United States in Switzerland.

== Other records and achievement worldwide ==
- Jackson has sold over 500 million records worldwide and he is one of three recording artists (along with Paul McCartney and Phil Collins) and the first American artist who have sold over 100 million records worldwide both as solo artists and (separately) as principal members of a band.
- Jackson is the most successful entertainer in history, according to the Guinness Book of World Records
- Most Watched Music Performance of all time (Super Bowl XXVII Halftime Show)
- Most watched music video of all time (Black or White)
- Most Photographed Person in the world (1997)
- Most successful touring act of all time with a career sellout rate of 99.5% across all performed shows & holds the venue records for sell outs of the Tokyo Dome (21 times), Estadio Azteca (5 times), Wembley Stadium (15 times) along with having sold the most tickets in Africa (230,000).
- To date, Jackson is the first and only artist to have five of his solo albums sell over 20 million copies worldwide: Off The Wall (20+ million), Thriller (70 million), Bad (35+ million), Dangerous (32+ million) and HIStory: Past, Present and Future, Book I (20 million) result, Jackson holds the record for artist with highest number of best-selling albums worldwide
- Thriller is the best-selling album of all time with claimed sales of 70-100 million
- Michael Jackson has sold the most studio albums in history with over 210 million across his 10 releases
- Jackson was the recipient of the Artist of the Millennium award and Artist of the Century Award.
- Best Selling Solo Artist of all time (as of 2000)
- Michael Jackson is the only act to ever have the first and second best selling album of all time (1991)
- Jackson was crowned the artist of the millennium in a global poll conducted by CNN, beating out Leonardo da Vinci and Ludwig van Beethoven
- Jackson has been credited with supporting more charities than any other artist – 39 charitable organizations – either with monetary donations through sponsorships of their projects or participation in their activities.
- Jackson's portrait on the Thriller cover is cited as the most distributed portrait and photograph in history.
- Jackson was listed by the Guinness Book of World Records as signing the largest commercial deal ever between a performer and a company when he made an agreement with Pepsi in 1986. The dollar amount was reported to be $50 million, with between $10 million and $15 million upfront.
- David O. Selznick's 1940 Best Film Oscar for Gone with the Wind (USA, 1939) was bought by Jackson for $1,542,000 on June 12, 1999, at Sotheby's, New York City. The Academy Awards no longer permits such sales, all but ensuring that it will remain the most expensive Oscar.
- In 1995, Jackson financed the most expensive music video: "Scream". The clip, which co-starred sister Janet Jackson, reportedly cost over US$7 million.
- In 1997, Jackson was named the most famous person in the world, Guinness World Records stated he was the world's most famous human being up until his death in 2009.
- Michael Jackson was paid 34 million dollars (adjusted) to perform one concert for the Sultan of Brunei, which is the most money ever allocated for a single music performance.
- On November 14, 1991, the debut of Michael Jackson's music video Black or White was broadcast simultaneously in 27 countries, to the largest audience in television history for a music video premiere: an estimated 500 million people.
- Jackson has the two best-selling VHS music videos ever released: "Moonwalker" (1988), and "The Making of Michael Jackson's Thriller (1984).
- Jackson's Bad world tour (1987–1989) was the second highest-grossing tour of the 1980s behind Pink Floyd's A Momentary Lapse of Reason Tour, with a gross of $125 million. His 1996–97 HIStory tour grossed $165 million, becoming one of the top five highest-grossing tours of the 1990s and became his highest-grossing concert tour to date. At the time, Jackson had the two highest-grossing tours ever given by a solo artist.
- While the bulk of his sales achievements have come in the fields of pop music and R&B, Jackson has also had success in subgenres. His Dangerous (1991) album (32 million sales worldwide) has been cited as the top-selling new jack swing album, while his Blood on the Dance Floor (6 million sales worldwide) is the biggest selling remix collection.
- Jackson's double album HIStory is the top-selling multiple disc album of all time by a male solo artist.
- Largest Internet Broadcast of all time (1999) - 10 Million Viewers
- Jackson was once one of the wealthiest artists in the world, with an estimated fortune of more than $750 million. In 2007, the Jackson estate's assets were calculated to be $1,360,839,979, with 85% of that total being Jackson's stake in the Sony/ATV Music Publishing song catalog that includes most of the Beatles' songs. Jackson also had sizeable debts that far outstripped his liquid cash total, which was just .05% of his net worth.
- Following his death, Jackson became the first artist to sell more than 2 million downloads in a week.
- Michael Jackson sold 35 million albums within the year following his death, which is the most in the soundscan era.
- On March 16, 2010, Sony Music Entertainment signed a record-breaking $250 million deal with Jackson's estate to retain distribution rights to his recordings until 2017 and release seven posthumous albums—some of which will feature unreleased material—over the next decade.
- In August 2010, Jackson became the 44th dancer/choreographer inducted into the National Museum of Dance Hall of Fame, and the hall's first inductee from the world of rock and roll.
- Michael Jackson's This Is It is the top-grossing documentary film of all time. It made $267.9 million (equivalent to $380 million in 2023) worldwide, and it is listed in the Guinness World Records as the highest-grossing documentary film at the global box office. It also set a record for concert films with $103.9 million in worldwide ticket sales in its first five days of release. By the end of 2010, the DVD sales for This Is It stood at 2.8 million units, with gross earnings of $45 million in the US alone. In Japan, This Is It earned $18 million in sales on the title's first day of release with 358,000 combined DVD sales.
- Jackson was named the most depicted figure of the 20th century by the National Portrait Gallery in 2018.
- In 2024, Sony purchased half (50%) of Michael Jackson's music catalogue at an estimated $600 million, which is proportionally equivalent or similar to the world's top record sale of British rock band Queen's (100%) complete catalogue for $1.27 billion. The figure would estimate total musical asset valuation of Jackson's around $1.2 billion. In music history, this is the largest deal ever made for the work of a single musician.
- With Billie Jean (thanks to the success of the film Michael), he entered the Billboard Global 200 chart for the first time, debuting at number 1 the week ending May 23, 2026, marking a historic milestone for Michael Jackson as the first artist who died before the creation of the Global 200 chart to reach number 1.
- Michael Jackson becomes the sixth posthumous artist to top the Billboard Artist 100 and the first artist who died before the creation of the Artist 100 to reach the number one spot in the week ending May 23, 2026.
- Michael Jackson makes history with Billie Jean: the first posthumous classical artist to be #1 on Spotify worldwide. Debuting in the global daily ranking on May 15, 2026. He would be the first artist prior to the creation of Spotify to be global #1.
- The biographical film Michael, based on his life, became the highest-grossing musical biopic of all time.

== See also ==
- List of awards and nominations received by Michael Jackson
- List of best-selling music artists in the United Kingdom in singles sales
- List of most expensive music videos
- List of best-selling albums
- List of best-selling albums in the United States
- List of music artists by net worth
- Philanthropy of Michael Jackson
