= Rockettes =

Rockettes may refer to:

- The Rockettes, a New York dance company famous for their kickline and eye-high kicks
- Helsinki Rockettes, a Finnish synchronized ice skating team
- Rockette Morton (born 1949), U.S. musician

== See also ==
- Can-can, a music hall dance
- Rocket (disambiguation)
- Rockett (disambiguation)
- Roquette (disambiguation)
