= Black Gold Awards =

Music awards show from 1984 to 1987

- Awarded for: Achievement in Black music and entertainment
- Country: United States
- First award: 1984
- Final award: 1987

Television/radio coverage
- Produced by: Dick Clark Productions

The Black Gold Awards were an American music awards program honoring achievements in Black music and entertainment.

Produced by Dick Clark Productions, the awards were presented as a televised ceremony featuring performances and award presentations by recording artists.

== Background ==
Following a format similar to other American Music Award ceremonies, The Black Gold Awards were created as a music awards program recognizing Black recording artists, producers, and performers whose music received widespread airplay on Black-oriented radio stations and in nightclubs across the United States.

Music journalist Nelson George described the program as a "salute to Black music".

== Production and broadcast ==
The Black Gold Awards were produced by Dick Clark Productions. The inaugural ceremony aired on March 15, 1984, and was hosted by Deniece Williams, Gladys Knight, and Lou Rawls.

The first broadcast was co-produced by Rawls and Dick Clark, distributed through first-run syndication and aired on independent television stations across the United States. The inaugural broadcast was carried by 83 television stations nationwide.

== Ceremonies ==
| Year | Ceremony | Location | Hosts | Selected honorees |
|---|---|---|---|---|
| 1984 | 1st Black Gold Awards | United States television broadcast | Deniece Williams, Gladys Knight, Lou Rawls | Michael Jackson, Joe Williams |
| 1985 | 2nd Black Gold Awards | Los Angeles | Lou Rawls, Melba Moore, Reggie Jackson | Patti LaBelle, Little Richard |
| 1986 | 3rd Black Gold Awards | Orpheum Theatre, Memphis | Lou Rawls, Melba Moore | Nancy Wilson |
| 1987 | 4th Black Gold Awards | Orpheum Theatre, Memphis | Lou Rawls, Melba Moore | Janet Jackson |

== First ceremony (1984) ==
The inaugural Black Gold Awards were broadcast on March 15, 1984, as a two-hour television special.

Patti LaBelle opened the ceremony with a performance of her song "If Only You Knew".

Michael Jackson was the most honored artist of the evening, receiving several awards connected with the success of his album Thriller.

Jazz singer Joe Williams received the Legend of the Year award.

=== Awards ===
- Album of the Year – Thriller – Michael Jackson
- Song of the Year – "All Night Long (All Night)" – Lionel Richie
- Top Female Vocalist – Gladys Knight
- Top Female Newcomer – Janet Jackson
- Top Male Vocalist – Michael Jackson
- Top Vocal Group – Gladys Knight & the Pips
- Top New Vocal Group – Klique
- Instrumental Record of the Year – "Rockit" – Herbie Hancock
- Legend of the Year – Joe Williams
- Single of the Year – "Billie Jean" – Michael Jackson
- Producer of the Year – Quincy Jones
- Top Male Newcomer – Kashif
- Best Video – "Beat It" – Michael Jackson
- Best Video Performance – "Beat It" – Michael Jackson

== Second ceremony (1985) ==
The second annual Black Gold Awards ceremony was hosted by Lou Rawls, Melba Moore, and Reggie Jackson.

Singer Philip Bailey appeared as a presenter during the program.

Little Richard received the Black Legend Award, while Patti LaBelle received the award for Top Female Vocalist.

=== Notable performers ===
- Evelyn "Champagne" King
- James Ingram
- Jeffrey Osborne
- Philip Bailey
- The Whispers

== Third ceremony (1986) ==
The third annual Black Gold Awards ceremony was taped on March 17, 1986, at the Orpheum Theatre in Memphis, Tennessee. The program was hosted by Lou Rawls and Melba Moore.

According to Dick Clark Productions vice president Gene Weed, the awards ceremony was moved from Los Angeles to Memphis because the city had a strong heritage in Black music.

The broadcast was taped before an audience of approximately 2,400 people. Performers appearing during the ceremony included Freddie Jackson, Meli'sa Morgan, New Edition, Run-D.M.C., and The Four Tops.

The telecast included tributes to Nancy Wilson and the late Otis Redding, with Redding's music performed by The Reddings.

Stevie Wonder was honored at the ceremony with the W. C. Handy Humanitarian Award.

== Fourth ceremony (1987) ==
The fourth annual Black Gold Awards ceremony was held in February 1987 at the Orpheum Theatre in Memphis.

Gregory Abbott and Anita Baker received top honors for new performers, while The Jets won the award for top new group. Janet Jackson was recognized with the top award for television/video.

The Black Gold Legend Awards were presented to The Mills Brothers, The Spinners, and gospel singer Andraé Crouch. Dorothy Irene Height, former president of the National Council of Negro Women, was honored with the W. C. Handy Award for Humanitarian Service.

== See also ==
- American Music Awards
- Soul Train Music Awards
- BET Awards
