= Rockett =

Rockett may refer to:

== Places ==
- Rockett, Texas, USA; an unincorporated community
- Rocketts Landing, Richmond, Virginia, USA; a neighborhood
  - Rocketts Landing station bus station

== People ==
- Dick Rockett (born 1931) Irish hurler
- Jason Rockett (born 1969) English soccer player
- Jushay Rockett (born 1984) U.S. basketball player
- Kevin Rockett, Irish film historian
- Marshe Rockett (born 1985) U.S. pro-wrestler
- Norman Rockett (1911-1996) U.S. film set artist
- Pat Rockett (born 1955) U.S. baseball player
- Rikki Rockett (born 1961) U.S. glam rocker of Poison

Groups

- The Rocketts, backup band for Wendy Stapleton

== See also ==
- Rocket (disambiguation)
- Rockettes (disambiguation)
