= Rockit =

Rockit may refer to:

- Rockit (album), a 1979 album by Chuck Berry
- "Rockit" (instrumental), a 1983 composition by Herbie Hancock
- "Rockit", a 2004 song by Gorillaz from D-Sides
- Rockit (TV series), a 1985 Australian rock music show
- Rockit Hong Kong Music Festival, a 2000s music festival

== See also ==
- Hollywood Rip Ride Rockit, a steel roller coaster at Universal Studios Florida in Orlando
- Rockit Mountain, a version of the indoor roller coaster Space Mountain at Disneyland in Anaheim, California
- Rock It (disambiguation)
- Rocket (disambiguation)
