= HMS Rocket =

Eight ships of the Royal Navy have borne the name HMS Rocket. Another was planned but never completed:

- HMS Rocket (1804) was a 4-gun fireship, previously the civilian Busy. She was purchased in 1804 and sold in 1807.
- HMS Rocket (1842) was an iron paddle tender launched in 1842 and broken up in 1850.
- HMS Rocket (1855) was a mortar vessel launched in 1855. She was renamed MV20 later that year and was broken up in 1865.
- HMS Rocket (1856) was an Albacore-class wooden screw gunboat launched in 1856 and broken up in 1864.
- HMS Rocket (1868) was a Beacon-class composite screw gunvessel launched in 1868 and sold in 1888.
- HMS Rocket (1894) was a Rocket-class destroyer launched in 1894 and sold in 1912.
- HMS Rocket was to have been a Laforey-class destroyer. She was renamed HMS Lucifer before being launched in 1913.
- HMS Rocket (1916) was an R-class destroyer launched in 1916 and sold in 1926.
- HMS Rocket (H92) was a later R-class destroyer launched in 1942, converted to a Type 15 frigate between 1949 and 1951 and scrapped in 1967.
