= Rocket (band) =

American rock band (formed 2021)

- Origin: Los Angeles, California, U.S.
- Genres: Alternative rock; grunge; shoegaze
- Years active: 2021–present
- Label: Transgressive
- Members: Alithea Tuttle; Baron Rinzler; Cooper Ladomade; Desi Scaglione
- Website: rockettheband.com

Rocket is an American alternative rock band from Los Angeles, California. Officially formed in 2021, Rocket is composed of singer and bassist Alithea Tuttle, guitarists Desi Scaglione (who is also the band's primary producer) and Baron Rinzler, and drummer Cooper Ladomade. The four were childhood friends who began writing songs during the COVID-19 pandemic in 2020. They debuted with the single "On Your Heels" in 2022, before releasing their debut EP, Versions of You, in 2023. In 2025, they released their debut full-length album, R Is for Rocket. They are currently signed to Transgressive Records.

== Musical style ==
Rocket's music has been cited as being reminiscent of 90s-era alternative rock and grunge, as well as having elements of shoegaze. They have cited bands such as The Smashing Pumpkins, Nirvana and My Bloody Valentine as inspirations.

In a 2025 interview with The Line of Best Fit, Scaglione stated "I don't think any of us consider ourselves a shoegaze or grunge band, at the end of the day, we're just a rock band. One that loves a lot of different kinds of music."

== Band members ==
- Alithea Tuttle – bass, lead vocals, keyboards
- Desi Scaglione – guitars, keyboards, production
- Baron Rinzler – guitars, keyboards

== Discography ==
- Versions of You (2023; EP)
- R Is for Rocket (2025)
