= R Is for Rocket (album) =

Studio album by Rocket
- Released: October 3, 2025
- Studios: 64 Sound; Studio 606
- Genre: Alternative Rock
- Length: 38:19
- Label: Transgressive
- Producer: Desi Scaglione

Rocket chronology
| Versions of You (2023) | R Is for Rocket (2025) |

R Is for Rocket is the debut studio album by American rock band Rocket. It was released on October 3, 2025, via Transgressive in LP, cassette, CD and digital formats.

== Reception ==
Professional ratings
Aggregate scores
| Source | Rating |
|---|---|
| Metacritic | 83/100 |
Review scores
| Source | Rating |
| Clash | 8/10 |
| DIY | 3.5/5 stars |
| NME | 4/5 stars |
| Paste | 7.9/10 |

The album received a rating of 7.9 from Paste, whose reviewer Hayden Merrick called it as "a fantastically confident and truly complete debut." Clash's Robin Murray noted it as "a record that blends hugely effective songwriting with wicked production values, granting their work a crisp 90s-adjacent sheen that refuses to sacrifice their raw live endeavours," which is "potent, concise, forceful, but also subtle when required" and "confident, strident guitar music".

In a four-star review for NME, Spencer Hughes referred to the album as "a promising debut that does a damn good job at what it set out to do: solid songs, played loud." The Fader described R Is for Rocket as "an album of ferociously defined, great guitar rock bangers." Abby Jones, in her "album of the week" review for Stereogum, remarked, "You won’t find many quiet moments across R Is For Rocket, but it strikes a satisfying balance between loud and melodic, its mixes full of cathartic noise without compromising detail or vibrancy."

== Track listing ==
R Is for Rocket track listing
| No. | Title | Length |
|---|---|---|
| 1. | "The Choice" | 3:24 |
| 2. | "Act Like Your Title" | 2:19 |
| 3. | "Crossing Fingers" | 3:22 |
| 4. | "One Million" | 3:47 |
| 5. | "Another Second Chance" | 5:05 |
| 6. | "Pretending" | 2:37 |
| 7. | "Crazy" | 3:14 |
| 8. | "Number One Fan" | 3:51 |
| 9. | "Wide Awake" | 4:09 |
| 10. | "R Is for Rocket" | 6:31 |
| Total length: | | 38:19 |

== Personnel ==
Credits adapted from Bandcamp.

=== Rocket ===
- Alithea Tuttle – vocals, bass, keyboards
- Desi Scaglione – guitar, keyboards, production, engineering, mixing
- Baron Rinzler – guitar, keyboards
- Cooper Ladomade – drums

=== Additional contributors ===
- Henri Cash – additional engineering
- Oliver Roman – additional engineering (tracks 4–7, 9)
- Howie Weinberg – mastering

== Charts ==
Chart performance for R Is for Rocket
| Chart (2025) | Peak position |
|---|---|
| UK Independent Albums Breakers (OCC) | 14 |
