= Marie-Christine Coisne-Roquette =

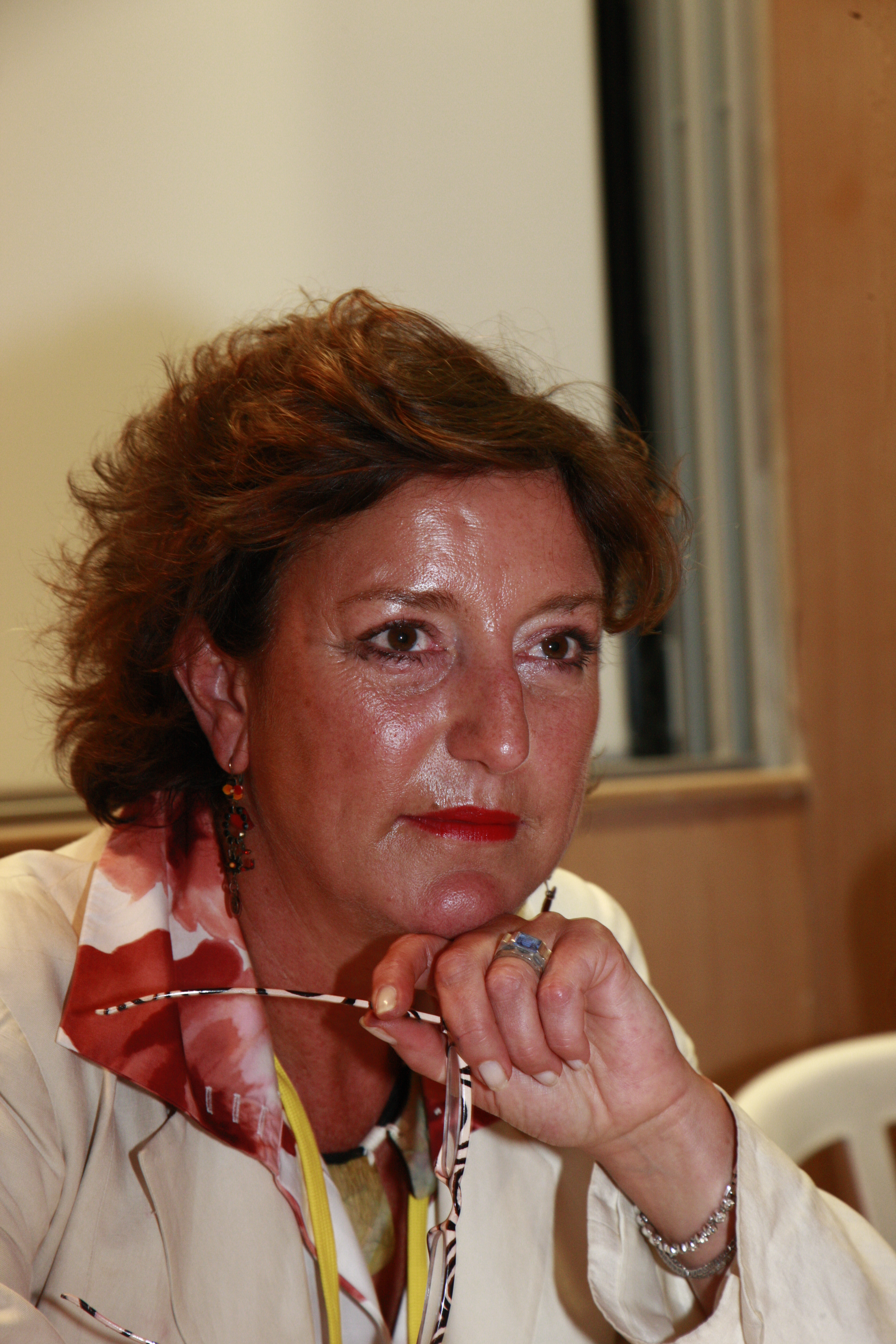
- Born: Marie-Christine Coisne; 4 November 1956 (age 69)
- Education: Paris Nanterre University
- Occupation: Businesswoman

Marie-Christine Coisne-Roquette (born 4 November 1956) is a French businesswoman. She serves as the chairwoman and chief executive officer of Sonepar.

== Early life ==
Marie-Christine Coisne-Roquette was born on 4 November 1956. Her great, great grandfather, Henri Coisne co-founded Sonepar with Léopold Lambert in 1862; it was a textile company, and it later became a distributor of electrical equipment.

Coisne-Roquette graduated from Paris Nanterre University, where she earned a degree in English and Law.

== Career ==
Coisne-Roquette began her career as a lawyer in 1980, when she joined Cabinet Sonier & Associés. She became a director of Sonepar in 1983, and joined the company in 1988. She has served as its chairwoman since 1998 and as its chief executive officer since 2002.

Coisne-Roquette is the founder and co-CEO of Financière de la Croix Blanche. She is also the founder of Roco Industries.

== Other activities ==
=== Corporate boards ===
- EssilorLuxottica, Member of the Board of Directors
- Total S.A., Member of the Board of Directors

=== Non-profit organizations ===
- Mouvement des Entreprises de France (MEDEF), Member of the Executive Committee (2009–2013)
- Association Nationale des Sociétés par Actions, Member of the Board of Directors

== Personal life ==
Coisne-Roquette is married to Michel Roquette, who serves on the board of the Association pour la Recherche sur Alzheimer with her. In 2016, she was worth an estimated €3.6 billion with her family. They are the 20th richest family in France.
