= Roquettes =

- Commune
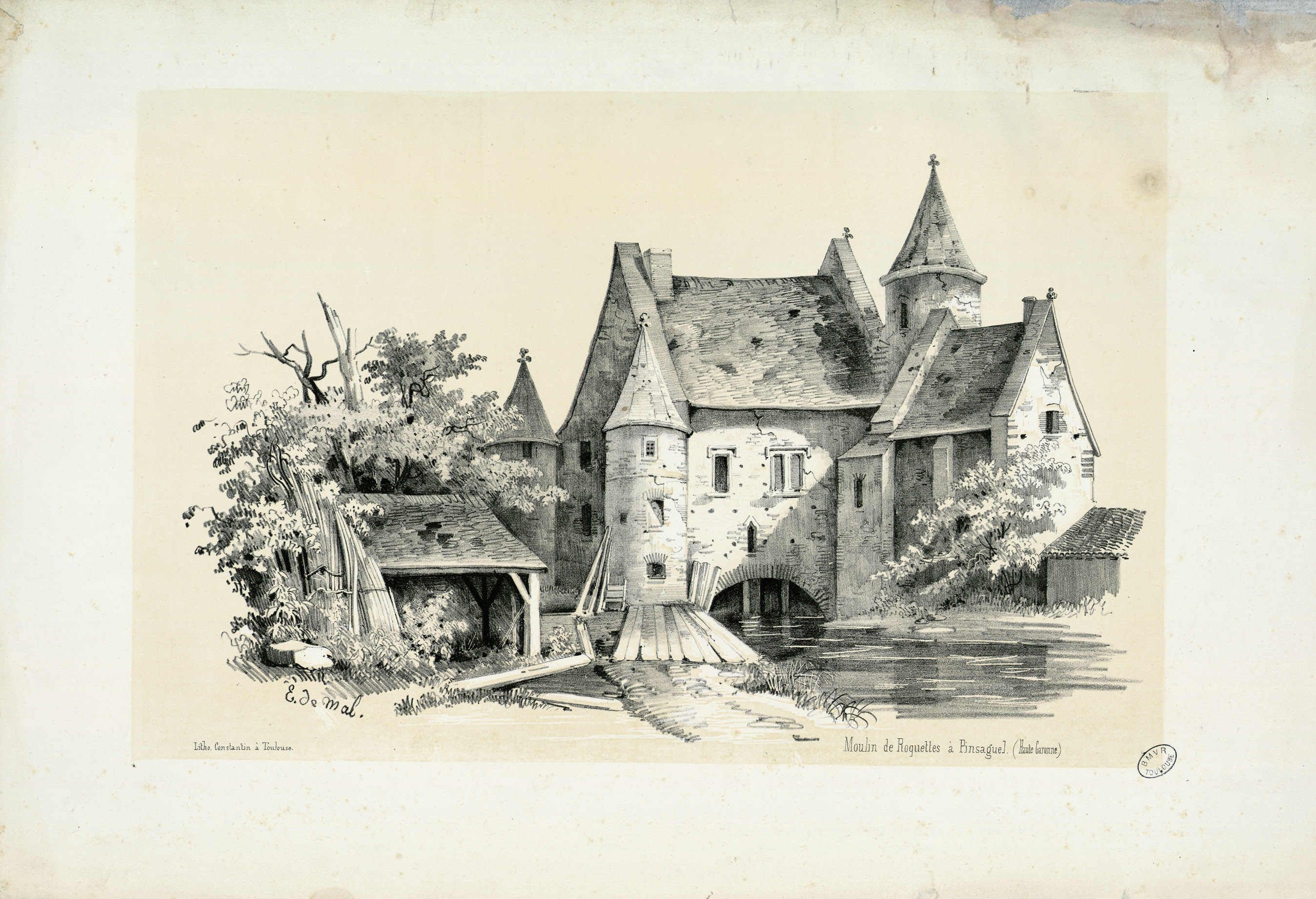
- Roquettes watermill by Eugène de Malbos, around 1840

- Coat of arms
- Location of Roquettes
- Location within France Location within Occitanie
- Coordinates: 43°30′00″N 1°22′02″E
- Country: France
- Region: Occitania
- Department: Haute-Garonne
- Arrondissement: Muret
- Canton: Portet-sur-Garonne
- Intercommunality: Le Muretain Agglo

Government
  - Mayor (2020–2026): Michel Capdecomme
- Area^{1}: 3.36 km^{2} (1.30 sq mi)
- Elevation: 155 m (509 ft)
- Highest elevation: 163 m (535 ft)
- Lowest elevation: 148 m (486 ft)
- Population (2023): 4,280
  - Density: 1,270/km^{2} (3,300/sq mi)
- Time zone: UTC+01:00 (CET)
  - Summer (DST): UTC+02:00 (CEST)
- INSEE/Postal code: 31460 /31120
- ^{1} French Land Register data, which excludes lakes, ponds, glaciers > 1 km^{2} (0.386 sq mi or 247 acres) and river estuaries.

Roquettes (French pronunciation: [ʁɔkɛt]; Occitan: Roquetas) is a commune in the Haute-Garonne department in southwestern France.

== Population ==
Historical population
Year	Pop.	±% p.a.
1968	234	—
1975	493	+11.23%
1982	2,200	+23.82%
1990	2,801	+3.07%
1999	3,285	+1.79%
2007	3,460	+0.65%
2012	4,193	+3.92%
2017	4,049	−0.70%
2023	4,280	+0.93%
Source: INSEE

== See also ==
- Communes of the Haute-Garonne department
