= Live in Bucharest: The Dangerous Tour =

Video by Michael Jackson
- Released: July 25, 2005
- Recorded: October 1, 1992
- Venue: Lia Manoliu Stadium (Bucharest, Romania)
- Genre: Pop, rock, soul
- Length: 2:01:58
- Label: Epic
- Director: Andy Morahan
- Producer: Kevin Wall

Michael Jackson chronology
The One (2004)	Live in Bucharest: The Dangerous Tour (2005)	Michael Jackson's Vision (2010)

Live in Bucharest: The Dangerous Tour is a live concert DVD by the American singer Michael Jackson released on July 25, 2005. It was previously included with The Ultimate Collection box set in 2004.

The concert took place during the first leg of Jackson's Dangerous World Tour on October 1, 1992, at the Bucharest National Stadium, with a sold-out attendance of 90,000. It was the last night of the first leg of the tour. This concert is the first by Jackson that has been officially released on DVD in the United States, also released in Asia market on double Video CD. The other official releases by Michael Jackson are a VHS of his HIStory World Tour concert in Seoul, South Korea, which was released only in South Korea in 1996, and Live at Wembley July 16, 1988, which is the second leg of his Bad World Tour.

== Reception ==
The concert special set a record for HBO at the time, becoming the channel's highest rated special. The DVD has sold over three million copies worldwide.

== Track listing ==
No.	Title	Writer(s)	Length
1.	"Jam"	Michael Jackson, René Moore, Bruce Swedien, Teddy Riley	8:16
2.	"Wanna Be Startin' Somethin'"	Jackson	5:13
3.	"Human Nature"	Steve Porcaro, John Bettis	5:02
4.	"Smooth Criminal"	Jackson	6:00
5.	"I Just Can't Stop Loving You" (duet with Siedah Garrett)	Jackson	4:45
6.	"She's Out of My Life"	Tom Bahler	4:53
7.	"I Want You Back/The Love You Save"	Berry Gordy, Freddie Perren, Alphonzo Mizell, Deke Richards	2:17
8.	"I'll Be There"	Berry Gordy, Bob West, Willie Hutch, Hal Davis	4:33
9.	"Thriller"	Rod Temperton	5:51
10.	"Billie Jean"	Jackson	7:44
11.	"Workin' Day and Night"	Jackson	10:04
12.	"Beat It"	Jackson	7:24
13.	"Will You Be There"	Jackson	6:51
14.	"Black or White"	Jackson, Bill Bottrell	6:38
15.	"Heal the World"	Jackson	8:53
16.	"Man in the Mirror"	Siedah Garrett, Glen Ballard	13:28

== Personnel ==
Performers

- Michael Jackson – lead vocals, dancer and choreographer

Dancers

- LaVelle Smith – choreographer and dancer
- Jamie King – dancer
- Evaldo Garcia – dancer
- Randy Allaire – dancer
- Damon Navandi – dancer
- Bruno "Taco" Falcon – dancer
- Michelle Berube – dancer
- Yoko Sumida – dancer

Musicians

- Greg Phillinganes – keyboards, synthesizers, musical director
- Kevin Dorsey – assistant musical director
- Brad Buxer – keyboards, synthesizers
- Ricky Lawson – drums, percussion
- Jennifer Batten – lead and rhythm guitar
- David Williams – lead and rhythm guitar
- Don Boyette – bass guitar, synth bass

Vocalists

- Dorian Holley – vocal director and backing vocals
- Kevin Dorsey – backing vocals
- Siedah Garrett – backing vocals, duet partner on "I Just Can't Stop Loving You"
- Darryl Phinnessee – backing vocals

== Charts ==
Chart (2005)	Peak position
Austrian Music DVDs Chart	4
Belgian (Flanders) Music DVDs Chart	2
Belgian (Wallonia) Music DVDs Chart	1
Dutch Music DVDs Chart	2
French Music DVDs Chart	1
Greek Music DVDs Chart	1

Chart (2009)	Peak position
Finnish Music DVDs Chart	1
French Music DVDs Chart	1
German Albums Chart	8
Irish Music DVDs Chart	1
New Zealand Music DVDs Chart	1
Spanish Music DVDs Chart	1
Swiss Music DVDs Chart	1

== Certifications ==
Region	Certification	Certified units/sales
Australia (ARIA)	14× Platinum	210,000^{^}
France (SNEP)	3× Platinum	60,000^{*}
Germany (BVMI)	Platinum	200,000^{‡}
Japan (RIAJ)	Gold	100,000^{^}
New Zealand (RMNZ)	4× Platinum	20,000^{^}
Poland (ZPAV)	Platinum	10,000^{*}
Portugal (AFP)	Platinum	8,000^{^}
Spain (Promusicae)	Platinum	25,000^{^}
United Kingdom (BPI)	2× Platinum	100,000^{^}
United States (RIAA)	8× Platinum	800,000^{^}
^{*} Sales figures based on certification alone.^{^} Shipments figures based on certification alone.^{‡} Sales+streaming figures based on certification alone.
