= Spy Game (disambiguation) =

Spy Game is a 2001 American action thriller film directed by Tony Scott.

Spy Game or Spy Games may also refer to:

- Spy Game (soundtrack), the soundtrack album to the film
- Spy Game (TV series), a 1997 American action TV series
- Spy Games, a 1999 American action film
- Spy Games (TV series), a 2020 American reality TV series
- Spy Games: Elevator Mission, a 2007 Japanese video game
- "Spy Game" (Bluey), an episode of the first season of the animated TV series Bluey
