= Spy Game (soundtrack) =

2001 album by Harry Gregson-Williams

Spy Game: Original Motion Picture Soundtrack

Soundtrack album of film score by Harry Gregson-Williams with The London Session Orchestra and Metro Voices
- Released: November 13, 2001
- Studio: Abbey Road Studios
- Genre: Film score
- Length: 71:34
- Label: Decca
- Producer: Harry Gregson-Williams

Harry Gregson-Williams chronology
Chicken Run: Original Motion Picture Soundtrack (with John Powell) (2000)	Spy Game: Original Motion Picture Soundtrack (2001)	Shrek: Original Motion Picture Score (with John Powell) (2001)

The soundtrack of the 2001 Tony Scott film Spy Game consists of a score composed by Harry Gregson-Williams and performed by The London Session Orchestra and Metro Voices, as well as several pieces by other artists. The album Spy Game: Original Motion Picture Soundtrack, containing arrangements of the film's score, was released by Decca Records on November 13, 2001.

== Reception and legacy ==
Professional ratings
Review scores
Source	Rating
AllMusic	3/5 stars
Filmtracks	4/5 stars

Critical reception of the album was limited. Editors at AllMusic rated this album three out of five stars, with critic William Ruhlmann writing that its assortment of genres was good for movie theatre goers but not for music listeners. Christian Clemmensen at Filmtracks rated the album four out of five stars, criticizing the electronic aspects of the compositions but finding significant merit in the eclectic use of symphonic music, non-English-language vocals, and ethnic instruments, particularly the erhu.

Portions of the score have subsequently appeared in other works. The British television series Spooks includes "Beirut, a War Zone" and "Operation Dinner Out" in its second series finale "Smoke and Mirrors". The track "Su-Chou Prison" is excerpted in the theatrical trailer for the 2005 film Syriana. The score cue "Do You Miss London?", which was not included in the soundtrack album, is used in the concluding scene of the 2012 movie Argo.

== Track listing ==
The film score was performed by Metro Voices and The London Session Orchestra at Abbey Road Studios, with Gregson-Williams conducting.

1. "Driving to Su-Chou Prison" (Harry Gregson-Williams) – 2:09
2. "Electrocution" (Gregson-Williams) – 1:57
3. "Searching Prison" (Gregson-Williams, Justin Burnett) – 4:36
4. "Muir Races to CIA" (Gregson-Williams) – 2:04)
5. "Muir Hides Bishop Files" (Gregson-Williams) – 1:36
6. "I've Only Got 10 Fingers" (Gregson-Williams) – 1:29
7. "Red Shirt" (Gregson-Williams) – 1:37
8. "Chopper" (Gregson-Williams) – 2:44
9. "Heroic" (Gregson-Williams) – 1:30
10. "Your Wife Is on the Line" (Gregson-Williams) – 1:19
11. "Muir's Ransacked Office" (Gregson-Williams) – 1:43
12. "Unger's Badge" (Gregson-Williams) – 1:01
13. "Training Montage" (Gregson-Williams, Christian Henson) – 2:49
14. "Operation Sideshow" (Gregson-Williams) – 1:13
15. "Throw Out the Bottle" (Gregson-Williams) – 1:51
16. "Dumping Schmidt" (Gregson-Williams) – 2:24
17. "Rooftop Berlin" (Gregson-Williams) – 2:37
18. "Why Are You Trying to Burn Bishop?" (Gregson-Williams) – 3:39
19. "You're Going to Miss It" (Gregson-Williams) – 3:08
20. "Harker Tracks Down Muir" (Gregson-Williams) – 2:52
21. "Intro to Beirut" (Gregson-Williams) – 0:54
22. "Smuggling Supplies" (Gregson-Williams) – 3:17
23. "Muir's Birthday" (Gregson-Williams) – 2:08
24. "Sheik Arrives" (Gregson-Williams) – 0:56
25. "Your Parents Were Murdered" (Gregson-Williams) – 1:50
26. "Do You Miss London?" (Gregson-Williams) – 3:17
27. "Do You Miss London?" (alternate) (Gregson-Williams) – 2:31
28. "Tell Me Your Real Name" (Gregson-Williams) – 2:42
29. "'Waiting Montage' – 'All Hell Broke Loose' – 'Drive to Nebaa'" (Gregson-Williams) – 4:07
30. "Doctor's Walk to Nebaa" (Gregson-Williams, John Nordstrom) – 3:04
31. "Explosion and Aftermath" (Gregson-Williams) – 2:52
32. "Airport" (Gregson-Williams) – 2:11
33. "Grand Cayman" (Gregson-Williams) – 6:37
34. "Forging Documents Montage" (Gregson-Williams, Henson) – 1:50
35. "'Muir's on the Hot Seat' – 'Operation Dinner Out'" (Gregson-Williams) – 5:53
36. "'Lights Out at Su-Chou' – 'Would You Have Told Us?' – 'Action Rescue'" (Gregson-Williams) – 5:41
37. "Freedom" (Gregson-Williams, Henson) – 1:36

=== Soundtrack album ===
The tracks on the soundtrack album are arrangements of cues from the film's unreleased score.

1. "Su-Chou Prison" – 5:00
2. "Muir Races to Work" – 3:32
3. "'... He's Been Arrested for Espionage.'" – 1:23
4. "Red Shirt" – 5:07
5. "Training Montage" – 2:34
6. "Berlin" – 2:18
7. "'It's Not a Game'" – 2:34
8. "'You're Going to Miss It'" – 9:15
9. "Beirut, a War Zone" – 3:20
10. "'My Name Is Tom'" – 2:41
11. "All Hell Breaks Loose" – 6:19
12. "Explosion and Aftermath" – 2:50
13. "Parting Company" – 2:08
14. "Harker Tracks Muir" – 3:28
15. "The Long Night" – 1:46
16. "Muir's in the Hot Seat" – 5:08
17. "Back at Su-Chou Prison" – 2:18
18. "Operation Dinner Out" – 4:50
19. "Spies" (Ryebot remix) – 2:16
20. "Dinner Out" (Rothrock remix) – 2:38

=== Other music ===
A number of pieces by other artists appear in the film.

- Nigel Kennedy and the English Chamber Orchestra – Four Seasons Concerto No. 1 in E, "Spring" (Vivaldi)
- Dire Straits – "Brothers in Arms" (Mark Knopfler)
- Joe Walsh – "Rocky Mountain Way" (Rocke Grace, Ken Passarelli, Joey Vitale, Joe Walsh)
- Pascale Machaalani – "Ti Zitas" ("Nour El Chams") (Nikos Terzis, Tassos Vougiatzis, Adel Raffoul)
- Dean Martin – "Let It Snow, Let It Snow, Let It Snow" (Jule Styne, Sammy Cahn)
- Jim Jamison – "I'm Always Here" (Baywatch Theme) (John D'Andrea, John Henry, Jim Jamison, Cory Lerios)
- Cory Cullinan – "The Bad News" (Cory Cullinan)
- Brian Keane, Omar Faruk Tekbilek, and Arto Tuncboyaciyan – "Siseler" (Arto Tuncboyaciyan, Brian Keane)

== Personnel ==
=== Primary artists ===
- Harry Gregson-Williams – composer, conductor, producer, orchestrator
- The London Session Orchestra – orchestra
  - Gavyn Wright – orchestra leader
- Metro Voices – vocals
- Ryeland Allison – remixer, "Spies" (Ryebot remix)
- Tom Rothrock – remixer, "Dinner Out" (Rothrock remix)

=== Additional musicians ===
- Khosro Ansari – Middle Eastern vocals
- Patrick Cassidy – Celtic harp
- Paul Clarvis – Middle Eastern drums
- Peter DiStefano – guitars
- Bob Daspit – percussion, percussion programming
- Christian Henson (credited as Christian Hensen) – percussion, percussion programming
- Greg Knowles – cymbalon
- David Lauser – percussion, percussion programming
- Anzu Lawson – Chinese vocals
- Guangming Li – erhu
- Hugh Marsh – electric violin
- John Nordstrom – percussion, percussion programming
- Fred Seldon – ethnic flutes
- Lisbeth Scott – Vietnamese vocals
- The Traditional Chinese Performing Arts Institute – Chinese percussion
- Timothy Washburn – boy soprano vocals

=== Technical personnel ===
- Justin Burnett – arranger
- Toby Chu – arranger, recording engineer
- Alastair King – score reader
- Alan Meyerson – recording engineer, mixing engineer
- Gregg Silk – recording engineer
- Tony Stanton – copyist
- Patricia Sullivan Fourstar – mastering engineer
