= Will You Be There =

1993 single by Michael Jackson

Single by Michael Jackson

from the album Dangerous and Free Willy: Original Motion Picture Soundtrack
- B-side: "Man in the Mirror"; "Girlfriend"
- Released: June 28, 1993
- Recorded: 1990–1991
- Genre: Pop; R&B; gospel
- Length: 7:40 (album version); 5:53 (film version); 3:40 (single version)
- Label: Epic
- Songwriter: Michael Jackson
- Producers: Michael Jackson; Bruce Swedien

Michael Jackson singles chronology
"Whatzupwitu" (1993)	"Will You Be There" (1993)	"Gone Too Soon" (1993)

Music video
- "Will You Be There" on YouTube

"Will You Be There" (Note: Subtitled "(Theme from Free Willy)") is a song by the American singer and songwriter Michael Jackson which was released on June 28, 1993, by Epic Records as the eighth single from his eighth studio album, Dangerous (1991). Jackson wrote and produced the song with additional production from Bruce Swedien. Following its live debut during MTV's 10th anniversary special, the song gained recognition in 1993 due to its use as the main theme on the soundtrack to the film Free Willy.

"Will You Be There" became yet another successful single from Dangerous, peaking at numbers seven and six on the US Billboard Hot 100 and Cash Box Top 100 charts, respectively, and selling one million copies to earn a platinum certification. Worldwide, "Will You Be There" peaked within the top 10 of the charts in Belgium, Canada, Ireland, the Netherlands, New Zealand, Switzerland, and the United Kingdom. The accompanying music video for the song was directed by Vince Patterson.

== Background ==
In the documentary Living with Michael Jackson, Jackson said that "Will You Be There" was one of several songs he wrote while at the Giving Tree, located on his Neverland Ranch property. "Heal the World", also from Dangerous, was written at the same location.

In a 2016 interview with /Film, Free Willy director Simon Wincer stated that the idea of including a Michael Jackson song in the film originated when the film's music budget increased following positive reception to an advance screening. It was hoped that Jackson would write and record an entirely new song for the film, but he was unable to do so in time for the film's release. "Will You Be There" was featured in the film at the suggestion of Jerry L. Greenberg, the president of Jackson's record label MJJ Music.

== Composition ==
The sheet music shows the key of D major and towards the end is modulated to E major, F♯ major and finally to A♭ major, The vocals span from D_{3} to E♭_{5}. The song has a tempo of 83 beats per minute. Jackson wrote and produced "Will You Be There"—with co-producing credits going to Bruce Swedien—and orchestrated the rhythm and vocal arrangements. Featured instruments are noted as piano, synthesizer, keyboard, drums, and percussion.

The album version of the song includes a prelude featuring the Cleveland Orchestra performing a portion of Beethoven's Symphony No. 9. The segment is from the fourth movement and is a lesser-known portion of the famous "Ode to Joy". The German lyrics were written by Friedrich Schiller.

German original	English translation
Ihr stürzt nieder, Millionen? Ahnest du den Schöpfer, Welt? Such' ihn über'm Sternenzelt! Über Sternen muss er wohnen.	Do you bow down, millions? Do you sense the Creator, world? Seek Him beyond the starry canopy! Beyond the stars must He dwell.

This classical introduction is then followed by a chorale interlude arranged by Andrae and Sandra Crouch. The Andrae Crouch Singers are heard throughout the rest of the song as well. At the ending, Jackson recites a poem. This spoken outro was also featured in his book Dancing the Dream.

== Legal issues ==
"Will You Be There" was the subject of two lawsuits. The first was for copyright infringement of a recording by the Cleveland Orchestra of Ludwig van Beethoven's "Symphony No. 9" that played for 67 seconds at the beginning of the song. The suit was filed by the Cleveland Orchestra for $7 million and was settled out of court with subsequent pressings of Dangerous including full credits in the album booklet. The second lawsuit was a claim of plagiarism by Italian songwriter Albano Carrisi who claimed that "Will You Be There" was copied from his song "I Cigni di Balaka" ("The Swans of Balaka"). After seven years, an Italian court ruled in favor of Carrisi because Jackson failed to show up to court. In a follow-up case some months later, the court ruled in favor of Jackson and rejected the claim, stating that while the two songs were very similar, they both may have been inspired by the Ink Spots' 1939 hit "Bless You for Being an Angel".

== Critical reception ==
Chris Lacy from Albumism noted the "gospel fervor" of "Will You Be There" and "Keep the Faith" in his retrospective on Dangerous' 25th anniversary, calling the former song "a symphonic, heart-wrenching confession in which the shackles of Jackson’s deepest insecurities snap and crash to the floor". The song was picked as critic's choice in a Billboard review from Larry Flick who described it as a "highly inspirational, gospel/pop tune", stating that Jackson "offers one of his purest vocals in a long while, wisely sidestepping busy instrumentation and studio gimmicks. As a result, listeners are reminded how special and unique he truly is." Troy J. Augusto from Cash Box named it Pick of the Week, saying, "Not as immediate as much of Michael's material, but dreamy enough to connect with his audience." He added, "Big vocal chorus and string arrangement add to song's appeal." Alan Jones from Music Week gave it four out of five, stating that this "Afrocentric, spiritually uplifting" track "will be a hit." Rolling Stone wrote that "the grandiose 'Will You Be There' never catches fire" and added that "the sequencing of Dangerous often clusters similar songs in bunches", and with that "it's easy to overlook" the following track "Keep The Faith" which, like "Will You Be There", also features the Andrae Crouch Singers. However, according to the article the latter song "is looser and sets off fireworks with a call-and-response gospel coda".

== Accolades ==
Award	Category	Result
1994 MTV Movie Awards	Best Song From a Movie	Won

== Music video ==
Vince Patterson directed two music videos for "Will You Be There". The official video included Jackson performing the song during various stops of the Dangerous World Tour while scenes from Free Willy centering around the friendship of Jesse and Willy are shown. The original VHS copies of Free Willy included the music video prior to the film, but also appeared as an extra in the Free Willy 10th Anniversary Special Edition DVD in addition to the Blu-ray. The second video from Dangerous: The Short Films combines the tour footage with the MTV's 10th Anniversary Special performance.

== Live performances ==
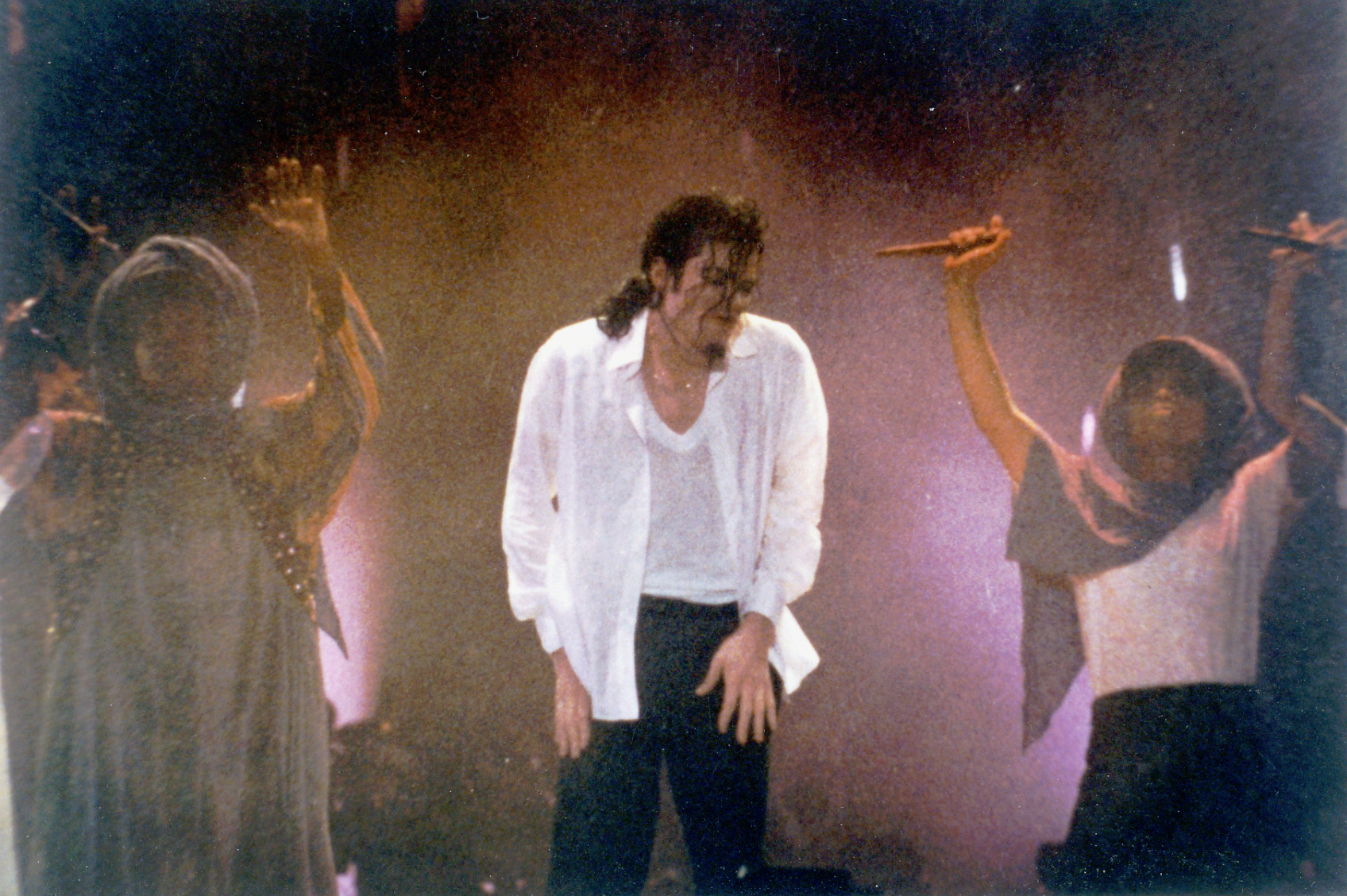
Jackson performing "Will You Be There" in Monza, Italy during the Dangerous World Tour in July 1992

"Will You Be There" along with "Black or White" both made their live debuts during MTV's 10th anniversary special that was taped in the summer of 1991 and later aired on ABC the day after the release of Dangerous on November 27 that year. Jackson would later perform it again throughout the Dangerous World Tour. The angel at the end of the 10th anniversary performance was played by Angela Ice.

At the 25th NAACP Image Awards in 1993 where Jackson accepted "Entertainer of the Year" that night, Daryl Coley, Patti LaBelle and the Voices of Faith Choir performed the song with Jackson joining in at the end. The song was planned for the HIStory World Tour but was not included in the final setlist. A version was released on the 2004 DVD Live in Bucharest: The Dangerous Tour. Jackson would have performed the song for the This Is It concerts which never took place due to his sudden death. The rehearsal for it, which took place on June 23, was not featured in the film This Is It (although it appears briefly on the DVD/Blu-ray bonus features), but was confirmed to have been part of the concert.

== Other performances ==
Jennifer Hudson performed the song at Jackson's memorial service on July 7, 2009.

Boyce Avenue included a cover of the song on their 2010 album Influential Sessions. Proceeds from sales of the cover as a single were donated to the American Red Cross to aid victims of the 2010 Haiti earthquake. Boyce Avenue frontman Alejandro Manzano said that "...though we knew that any cover of [Michael Jackson's] music would pale in comparison to the original, we were still compelled to give a shout out to the late great in this time of need, by doing our rendition of one of our favorite songs of his, 'Will You Be There.'"

A remix of "Will You Be There" was included in Cirque du Soleil's 2011 show Michael Jackson: The Immortal World Tour.

== Track listing ==
- CD and 12" single
1. "Will You Be There" (Radio Edit) – 3:40
2. "Man in the Mirror" – 5:19
3. "Girlfriend" – 3:04
4. "Will You Be There" (Album Version) – 7:40
- 7" and cassette single
1. "Will You Be There" (Radio Edit) – 3:40
2. "Will You Be There" (Instrumental) – 3:40
- 3-inch single
1. "Will You Be There" (Radio Edit) – 3:40
2. "Girlfriend" – 3:04
- Australian Maxi CD single
1. "Will You Be There" (Radio Edit) – 3:40
2. "Will You Be There" (Edit) – 5:22
3. "Man in the Mirror" – 5:19
4. "Girlfriend" – 3:04
5. "Will You Be There" (Album Version) – 7:40
- Video single
1. "Will You Be There" (music video) – 5:56

== Personnel ==
- Written, composed, produced, solo and background vocals by Michael Jackson
- Co-produced by Bruce Swedien
- Recorded and mixed by Bruce Swedien and Matt Forger
- Rhythm arrangement by Michael Jackson and Greg Phillinganes
- Orchestra arranged and conducted by Johnny Mandel
- Vocal arrangement by Michael Jackson
- Choir arrangement by Andrae and Sandra Crouch, featuring the Andrae Crouch Singers
- Greg Phillinganes and Brad Buxer: Keyboards
- Michael Boddicker: Synthesizers
- Rhett Lawrence: Synthesizers and synthesizer programming
- Brad Buxer, Bruce Swedien: Drums and percussion
- Paulinho Da Costa: Percussion
- Prelude – Beethoven: Symphony No. 9 in D Minor, Opus 125: Presto
  - Performed by the Cleveland Orchestra Chorus
  - Directed by Robert Shaw
  - Performed by the Cleveland Orchestra
  - Conducted by George Szell

== Charts ==
=== Weekly charts ===
Weekly chart performance for "Will You Be There"
Chart (1993)	Peak position
Australia (ARIA)	58
Austria (Ö3 Austria Top 40)	11
Belgium (Ultratop 50 Flanders)	3
Canada Top Singles (RPM)	6
Canada Retail Singles (The Record)	3
Canada Adult Contemporary (RPM)	3
Canada Contemporary Hit Radio (The Record)	6
Europe (Eurochart Hot 100)	13
Europe (European Hit Radio)	4
Finland (Suomen virallinen lista)	12
France (SNEP)	29
Germany (GfK)	12
Ireland (IRMA)	6
Netherlands (Dutch Top 40)	3
Netherlands (Single Top 100)	3
New Zealand (Recorded Music NZ)	2
Peru (UPI)	3
Switzerland (Schweizer Hitparade)	11
UK Singles (Official Charts)	9
UK Airplay (Music Week)	7
US Billboard Hot 100	7
US Adult Contemporary (Billboard)	5
US Hot R&B/Hip-Hop Songs (Billboard)	53
US Pop Airplay (Billboard)	3
US Cash Box Top 100	6

2009 weekly chart performance for "Will You Be There"
Chart (2009)	Peak position
Australia (ARIA)	42
Austria (Ö3 Austria Top 40)	19
Canada (Nielsen SoundScan)	11
Denmark (Tracklisten)	14
Germany (GfK)	26
Netherlands (Single Top 100)	14
New Zealand (Recorded Music NZ)	29
Sweden (Sverigetopplistan)	22
Switzerland (Schweizer Hitparade)	3
UK Singles (Official Charts)	51
US Digital Songs (Billboard)	10

=== Year-end charts ===
Year-end chart performance for "Will You Be There"
Chart (1993)	Position
Belgium (Ultratop)	20
Canada Top Singles (RPM)	46
Canada Adult Contemporary (RPM)	19
Europe (Eurochart Hot 100)	69
Europe (European Hit Radio)	21
Germany (Media Control)	45
Netherlands (Dutch Top 40)	16
Netherlands (Single Top 100)	24
New Zealand (RIANZ)	21
UK Singles (OCC)	92
US Billboard Hot 100	47
US Adult Contemporary (Billboard)	26
US Cash Box Top 100	42

== Certifications ==
Sale certifications for "Will You Be There"
Region	Certification	Certified units/sales
Canada (Music Canada)	Gold	40,000^{‡}
New Zealand (RMNZ)	Gold	5,000^{*}
United Kingdom (BPI)	Silver	200,000^{‡}
United States (RIAA)	Platinum	1,000,000^{‡}
^{*} Sales figures based on certification alone.^{‡} Sales+streaming figures based on certification alone.

== Release history ==
Release dates and formats for "Will You Be There"
Region	Date	Format(s)	Label(s)	Ref.
United Kingdom	June 28, 1993	—N/a	Epic	
Australia	July 12, 1993	CD; cassette	Epic	
Japan	August 1, 1993	Mini-CD	Epic	
