= Dangerous World Tour =

1992–1993 concert tour by Michael Jackson

- World tour by Michael Jackson
- Promotional image for the tour
- Location: Asia; Europe; Africa; North America; South America
- Associated album: Dangerous
- Start date: June 27, 1992
- End date: November 11, 1993
- Legs: 2
- No. of shows: 70
- Attendance: 3,992,000
- Box office: US$100 million ($223 million in 2024 dollars)

Michael Jackson concert chronology
- Bad (1987–1989); Dangerous World Tour (1992–1993); HIStory World Tour (1996–1997)

The Dangerous World Tour was the second world concert tour by American singer Michael Jackson and was staged to promote his eighth studio album, Dangerous (1991). The tour was sponsored by Pepsi. All profits were donated to various charities including Jackson's own Heal the World Foundation. The tour began in Munich on June 27, 1992, and concluded in Mexico City on November 11, 1993, playing 70 concerts in Europe, Asia and Latin America. Jackson performed in stadiums across the world with all his concerts being sold out in countries in Asia, Latin America, and Europe. The tour grossed over $100 million (equivalent to $220 million in 2025) and was attended by up to 3.9 million people.

The October 1, 1992, concert in Bucharest was filmed for broadcast on the HBO network on October 10. Jackson sold the film rights for the concert for $20 million (equivalent to $46 million in 2025), then the highest amount for a concert performer to appear on television. The special, Live in Bucharest: The Dangerous Tour, earned Jackson the second of two CableACE Awards of his career, this one for Outstanding Performance Musical Special.

== Background ==
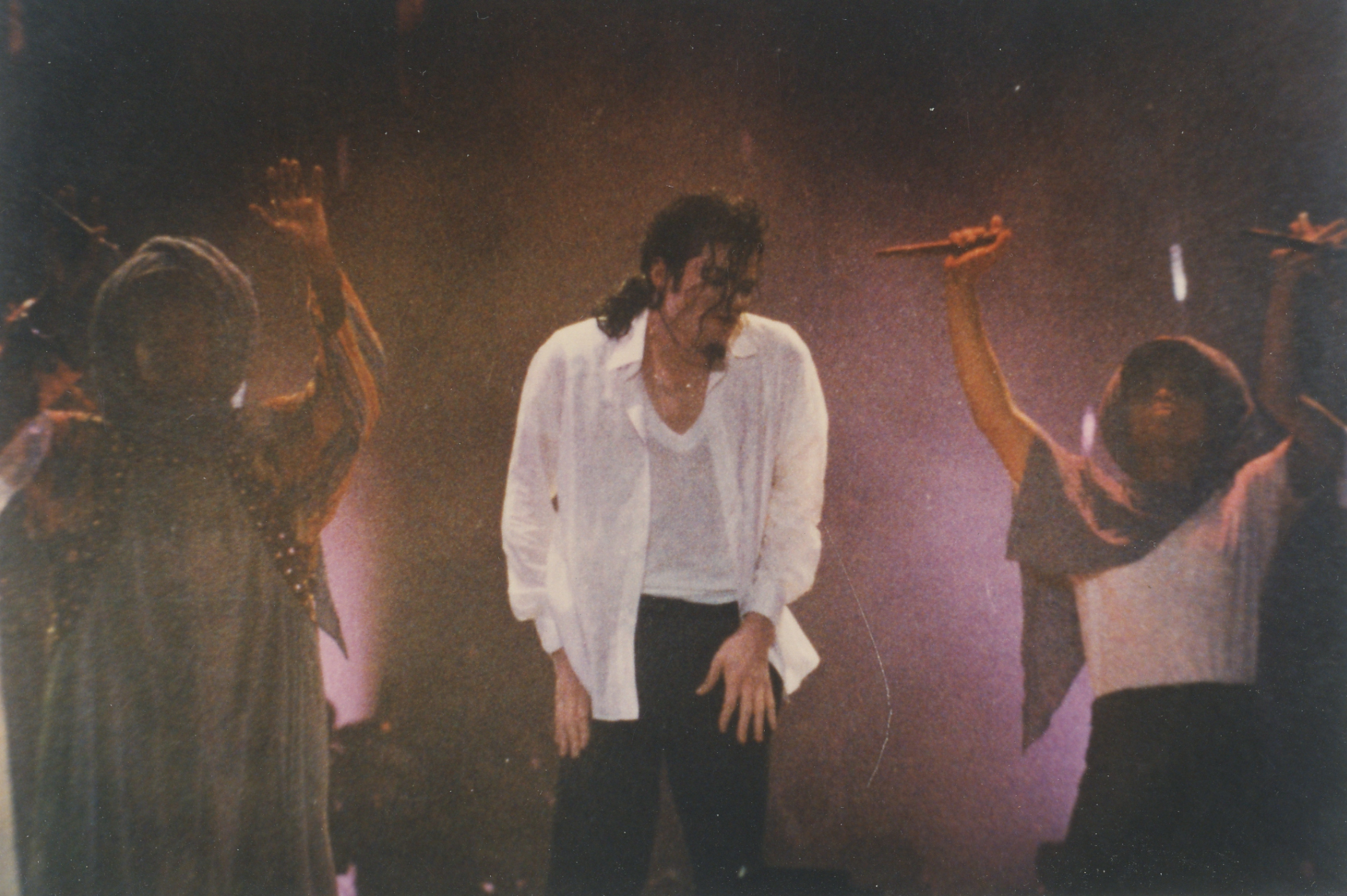
Jackson performing "Will You Be There" in Monza, Italy in 1992

On January 27, 1989, Jackson finished his Bad tour, his first as a solo artist, which had grossed over $125 million. Initially he planned not to tour again and concentrate on making albums and films. Following the release of his eighth studio album Dangerous in November 1991, a press conference was held on February 3, 1992, at Radio City Music Hall in New York City to announce the Dangerous World Tour. The event, attended by 200 people, was organized by Jackson's sponsor Pepsi with the artist also present. Jackson explained his sole reason for touring once more was to raise funds for his newly formed Heal the World Foundation to aid children and the environment. He aimed to raise $100 million for the charity by Christmas 1993. It was revealed that Jackson planned to perform across Europe, Asia, Latin America, and Australia, with no dates in the United States or Canada. Jackson commented: "I am looking forward to this tour because it will allow me to devote time to visiting children all around the world, as well as spread the message of global love, in the hope that others will be moved to do their share to help heal the world".

== Development ==
In June 1992, a Russian Antonov AN-124 cargo jet, then the world's largest operating airplane, was booked to transport the equipment and stage set from Los Angeles to London for the opening European leg. However, problems regarding its civilian aircraft certification led to Jackson using a Federal Express Boeing 747 instead. Upon arrival, the equipment was transported across Europe by 65 lorries. The cargo included 1,000 lights, 10 miles of electrical cable, 9 video screens, and 168 speakers. Around 2 tons of clothing was transported. The outfits were designed by Michael Bush and Dennis Tompkins, who worked with Jackson to gain an idea on what he wanted and aimed to "bring his ideas to life". Two outfits were 9 feet tall, 7 feet wide, and weighed 40 lbs. each, with fiber optic lights controlled by a computerized laser. One jacket was fitted with a battery belt generating 3,000 volts to light the 36 strobe lights on it. Another had hidden flaps to conceal explosive effects. 1,000 yards of fabric from Europe was used to make the costumes, including a black and gold outfit for Jackson which included 18-karat gold. The costumes alone cost $2 million.

The show incorporated various stage illusions. Among them was the "toaster" effect where Jackson entered the stage on a rapidly rising catapult from underneath, sending off pyrotechnics at the same time. His sister Janet said: "That opening was kick-ass. I'm sitting in the sound tower, and all the kids are everywhere. And when he jumped out of whatever the hell that thing was [...] the kids in front of me were looking back and I didn't even know it." Most of the 1992 shows included a stage trick during the transition from "Thriller" to "Billie Jean", whereby Jackson walks into two pillars and is secretly switched with a werewolf-masked backup dancer disguised as himself while he changes outfits for "Billie Jean". The masked "Jackson" is placed into a coffin which disappears when dancers posing as the skeletons and zombies drape a cloth over the coffin and pull it out. Jackson then appears on an upper stage level and sings "Billie Jean". When the full trick was not performed, it featured a sequence with the Jackson impersonator and the backup dancers performing dances from "Thriller". In some concerts, the Jackson impersonator would go backstage after singing the main chorus of the song, instead of doing a reprise of the "Thriller" dance, and the zombie backup dancers would do a reprise of the dance by themselves. Another such illusion was used to transition to "Beat It" from "Working Day and Night".

This was the first tour to have Jackson doing "the Anti-gravity lean" during "Smooth Criminal"; the song was part of his Bad tour set list, but its choreography did not match the music video (which only premiered on TV during the second American leg of the tour).

== Overview ==
=== Europe and Asia (1992) ===
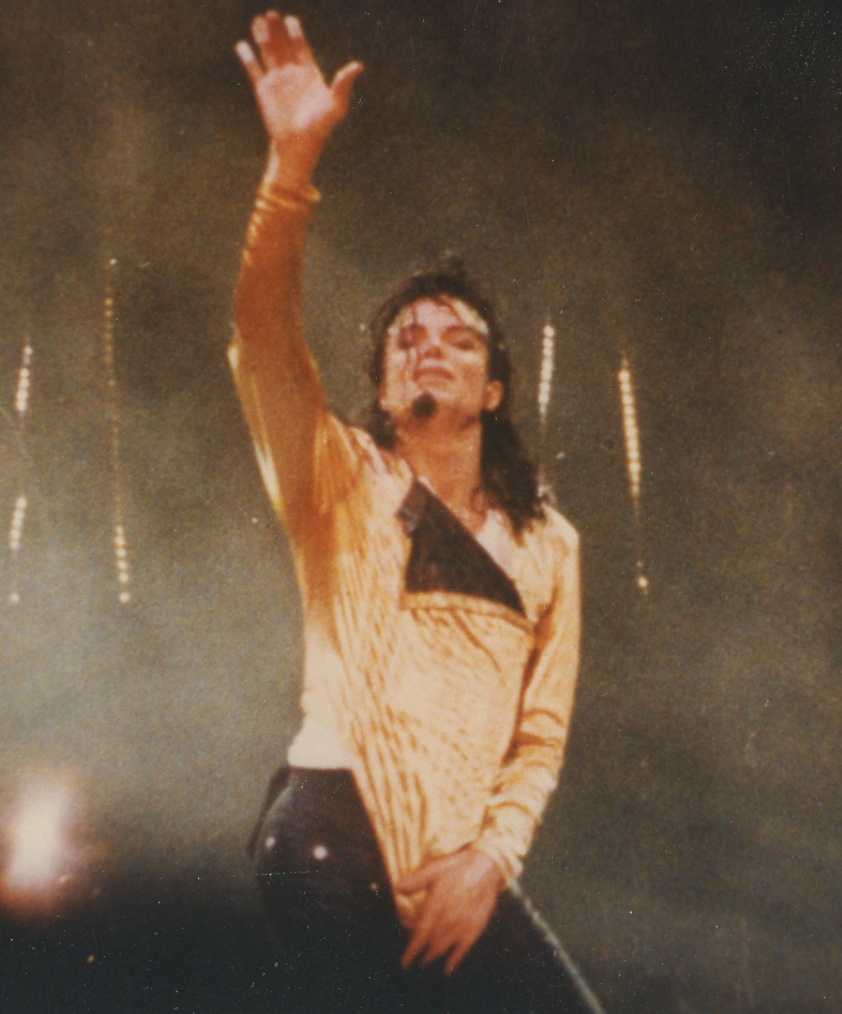
Jackson performing "Human Nature"

During the Europe leg in 1992, MTV was allowed to film backstage and broadcast six 15-minute episodes of the tour. The show was called The Dangerous Diaries and was presented by Sonya Saul. MTV released footage of "Billie Jean" and "Black or White" at the first show in Munich. "Billie Jean" was released with two different versions, one by MTV as a special, and the other on the Dangerous Diaries documentary. Both versions have placed a snippet of Jackson's original a cappella recording for "Billie Jean" over the live vocals when Jackson throws his fedora.

During the Cardiff concert performed on August 5, the show was temporarily halted between "She's Out of My Life" and the "Jackson 5 Medley" due to heavy rain, with a message being sent out over the speakers. Jackson also had to stand on a towel to keep balance during "I Just Can't Stop Loving You". The Toulouse concert performed on September 16, featured a special instrumental performance of the first half of the song "In the Closet" as an interlude between "Heal the World" and "Man in the Mirror". Princess Stéphanie of Monaco, who was the "Mystery Girl" in the actual song, was in attendance at this concert. This concert marked the first and only time that this song was performed during this tour, although it was performed on his next tour.

=== Super Bowl halftime show (1993) ===
Between the two legs of the tour, Jackson performed a brief but widely seen concert at the Super Bowl XXVII halftime show on January 31, 1993. The National Football League donated $100,000 to the Heal the World Foundation in lieu of payment to Jackson.

=== Asia, Europe and Latin America (1993) ===
The 1993 leg of the tour started in Bangkok, Thailand on August 24, the same day that a child sexual abuse accusation against Jackson was made public. The September 1st concert in Singapore was scheduled for August 30th but was rescheduled due to Jackson collapsing before the show. During his visit to Moscow in September, Jackson came up with the song "Stranger in Moscow" which would be released on his succeeding album HIStory: Past, Present and Future, Book I. It was during a time when Jackson felt very alone, far away from his family and friends, yet every night, throughout his tours, fans would stay by his hotel and support him.

Jackson eventually cancelled the remaining dates of the tour, claiming that recent child molestation allegations against him had caused an addiction to prescription painkillers he was taking in relation to burns he suffered during the filming of a commercial for Pepsi in 1984.

== Broadcasts and recordings ==
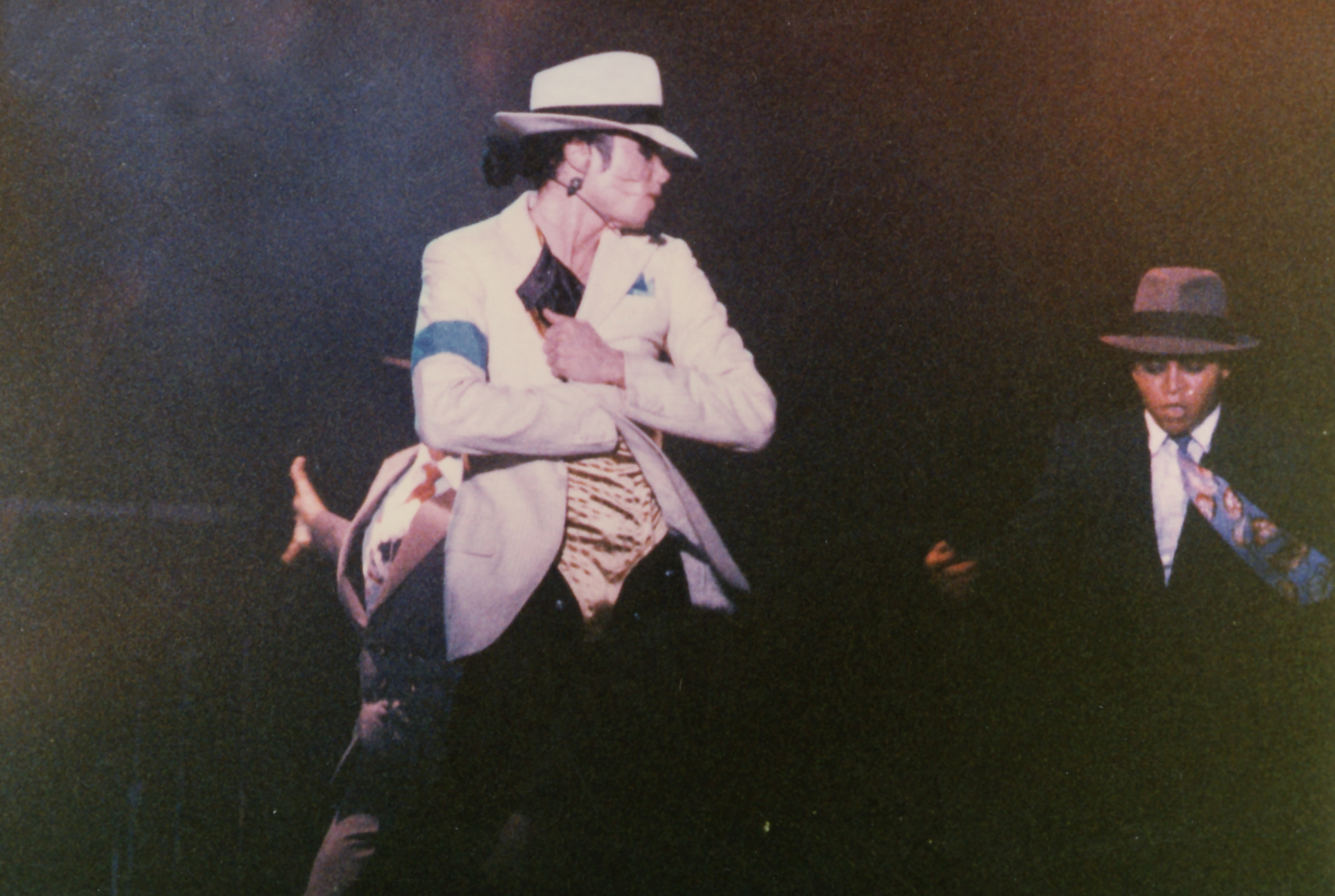
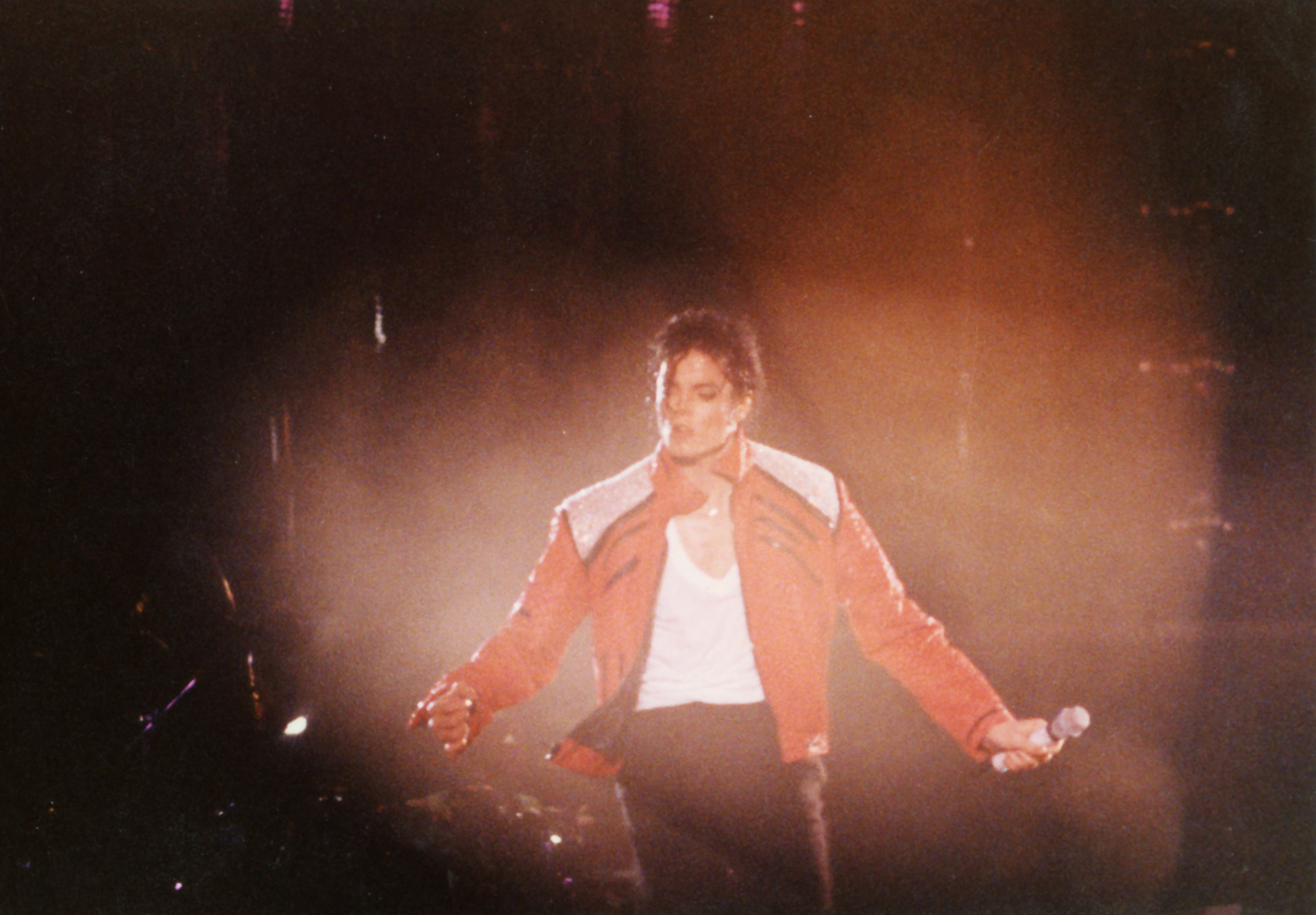
Jackson performing "Smooth Criminal" (top) and "Beat It" (bottom) during the tour

All concerts were professionally filmed by Nocturne Productions Inc., which filmed all of Jackson's tours and private affairs. During the 1992 European leg of the tour, MTV was given permission to film backstage reports, interview the cast and film live performance. The mini-show was hosted by Sonya Saul and had six 15-minute mini-episodes of concerts in Munich, Werchter, Dublin, Stockholm, Hamburg, Cardiff, London, Leeds, Berlin, Oviedo, and Madrid. Performances include "Billie Jean", "Black or White", "Jam", "Wanna Be Startin' Somethin'", and "Will You Be There".

The concert in Bucharest on October 1, was filmed and broadcast on television all across the world, giving HBO the highest rating garnered in cable TV history, with an alternate version airing on the BBC. The concert film titled Live in Bucharest: The Dangerous Tour was officially released on DVD on July 25, 2005. Full concerts at Oslo (July 15) and Copenhagen (July 20) were fundraised for online by the fans and purchased from private owners of those respective concerts, and performances at Bremen (August 8), Buenos Aires (October 12, 1993), Mexico City (November 11) and several scattered amateur recordings have been shared online and can be found on YouTube.

== Opening acts ==
- Kris Kross (1992 European dates [30])
- Rozalla (Europe [3])
- D'Influence (England and Scotland [7])
- Snap! (Bucharest [1])
- Culture Beat (1993 European dates [3])
- TLC (Latin America [11])

== Set list ==
=== 1992 ===
The following set list was performed throughout 1992 but is not intended to represent the majority of performances.

1. "Brace Yourself" (video introduction) (contains elements of "Carmina Burana: I. O Fortuna" and "Great Gates of Kiev")
2. "Jam"
3. "Wanna Be Startin' Somethin'"
4. "Human Nature"
5. "Smooth Criminal"
6. "I Just Can't Stop Loving You" (with Siedah Garrett)
7. "She's Out of My Life"
8. The Jackson 5 Medley: "I Want You Back" / "The Love You Save" / "I'll Be There"
9. "Thriller"
10. "Billie Jean"
11. "Black Panther" (video interlude)
12. "Working Day and Night"
13. "Beat It"
14. "Someone Put Your Hand Out" (instrumental interlude)
15. "Will You Be There"
16. "The Way You Make Me Feel"
17. "Bad"
18. "Black or White"
19. "We Are the World" (video interlude)
20. "Heal the World"
21. "Man in the Mirror" / "Rocket Man"

=== 1993 ===
The following set list was performed throughout 1993 but is not intended to represent the majority of performances.

1. "Brace Yourself" (video introduction) (contains elements of "Carmina Burana: I. O Fortuna")
2. "Jam"
3. "Wanna Be Startin' Somethin'"
4. "Human Nature"
5. "Smooth Criminal"
6. "I Just Can't Stop Loving You" (with Siedah Garrett)
7. "She's Out of My Life"
8. The Jackson 5 Medley: "I Want You Back" / "The Love You Save" / "I'll Be There"
9. "Thriller"
10. "Billie Jean"
11. "Black Panther" (video interlude)
12. "Will You Be There"
13. "Dangerous"
14. "Black or White"
15. "We Are the World" (video interlude)
16. "Heal the World"
17. "Man in the Mirror" / "Rocket Man"

Alterations

- "Rock with You", "Remember the Time", and "In the Closet" were rehearsed for the initial setlist in 1992, but were cut for time and technical reasons. Remember the Time was still rehearsed at Bucharest, before the October 1st, 1992 concert, although not performed.
- From July 17 to October 1, 1992, "The Way You Make Me Feel" and "Bad" were temporarily removed from the setlist. These songs were re-added to the setlist for the first five Tokyo shows. Despite being rehearsed for the 1993 leg, they were ultimately cut.
- Slash made guest appearances for the performances of "Black or White" in Oviedo and the last two concerts in Tokyo.
- For the 1993 leg, "Working Day and Night", "Beat It", and the instrumental of "Someone Put Your Hand Out" were not performed, despite being rehearsed.
- Starting on October 31, 1993, "I Want You Back", "The Love You Save", and "I'll Be There" were permanently cut from the setlist.
- The instrumental version of "In the Closet" was played in between "Heal the World" and "Man in the Mirror" in Toulouse.
- "Dangerous" was performed twice for the concert in Fukuoka on September 10, 1993. The first performance was the regular performance of the song. The second was an instrumental, performed after "Heal the World".
- "Man in the Mirror" and "Rocket Man" were only performed on select dates in 1993.
- The white shirt worn for "Will You Be There" was replaced with a black 'armband' jacket at the Istanbul concert.

== Tour dates ==
List of 1992 concerts, showing date, city, country, venue, tickets sold and number of available tickets
| Date | City | Country | Venue | Attendance |
|---|---|---|---|---|
| June 27, 1992 | Munich | Germany | Olympiastadion | 72,000 / 72,000 |
| June 30, 1992 | Rotterdam | Netherlands | Stadion Feijenoord | 100,000 / 100,000 |
| July 1, 1992 | Rotterdam | Netherlands | Stadion Feijenoord | 100,000 / 100,000 |
| July 4, 1992 | Rome | Italy | Stadio Flaminio | 40,000 / 40,000 |
| July 6, 1992 | Monza | Italy | Stadio Brianteo | 46,000 / 46,000 |
| July 7, 1992 | Monza | Italy | Stadio Brianteo | 46,000 / 46,000 |
| July 11, 1992 | Cologne | Germany | Müngersdorfer Stadion | 50,000 / 50,000 |
| July 15, 1992 | Oslo | Norway | Valle Hovin | 35,000 / 35,000 |
| July 17, 1992 | Stockholm | Sweden | Stockholm Olympic Stadium | 106,000 / 106,000 |
| July 18, 1992 | Stockholm | Sweden | Stockholm Olympic Stadium | 106,000 / 106,000 |
| July 20, 1992 | Copenhagen | Denmark | Gentofte Stadion | 30,000 / 30,000 |
| July 22, 1992 | Werchter | Belgium | Werchter Festivalpark | 60,000 / 60,000 |
| July 25, 1992 | Dublin | Ireland | Lansdowne Road | 43,000 / 43,000 |
| July 30, 1992 | London | England | Wembley Stadium | 144,000 / 144,000 |
| July 31, 1992 | London | England | Wembley Stadium | 144,000 / 144,000 |
| August 5, 1992 | Cardiff | Wales | Cardiff Arms Park | 50,000 / 50,000 |
| August 8, 1992 | Bremen | Germany | Weserstadion | 42,000 / 42,000 |
| August 10, 1992 | Hamburg | Germany | Volksparkstadion | 50,000 / 50,000 |
| August 13, 1992 | Hamelin | Germany | Weserberglandstadion | 25,000 / 25,000 |
| August 16, 1992 | Leeds | England | Roundhay Park | 60,000 / 60,000 |
| August 18, 1992 | Glasgow | Scotland | Glasgow Green | 65,000 / 65,000 |
| August 20, 1992 | London | England | Wembley Stadium | 216,000 / 216,000 |
| August 22, 1992 | London | England | Wembley Stadium | 216,000 / 216,000 |
| August 23, 1992 (Note: Originally August 1, 1992, but was rescheduled to Jackson's viral infection.) | London | England | Wembley Stadium | 216,000 / 216,000 |
| August 26, 1992 | Vienna | Austria | Praterstadion | 50,000 / 50,000 |
| August 28, 1992 | Frankfurt | Germany | Waldstadion | 60,000 / 60,000 |
| August 30, 1992 | Ludwigshafen | Germany | Südweststadion | 35,000 / 35,000 |
| September 2, 1992 | Bayreuth | Germany | Hans-Walter-Wild-Stadion | 32,000 / 32,000 |
| September 4, 1992 | Berlin | Germany | Friedrich-Ludwig-Jahn-Stadion | 35,000 / 35,000 |
| September 8, 1992 | Lausanne | Switzerland | Stade Olympique de la Pontaise | 45,000 / 45,000 |
| September 13, 1992 | Paris | France | Hippodrome de Vincennes | 85,000 / 85,000 |
| September 16, 1992 | Toulouse | France | Stade de Toulouse | 40,000 / 40,000 |
| September 18, 1992 | Barcelona | Spain | Estadi Olímpic de Montjuïc | 60,000 / 60,000 |
| September 21, 1992 | Oviedo | Spain | Estadio Carlos Tartiere | 25,000 / 25,000 |
| September 23, 1992 | Madrid | Spain | Vicente Calderón Stadium | 40,000 / 40,000 |
| September 26, 1992 | Lisbon | Portugal | Estádio José Alvalade | 55,000 / 55,000 |
| October 1, 1992 (Note: Originally September 29, 1992, but was rescheduled due to health issues.) | Bucharest | Romania | Lia Manoliu National Stadium | 90,000 / 90,000 |
| December 12, 1992 | Tokyo | Japan | Tokyo Dome | 360,000 / 360,000 |
| December 14, 1992 | Tokyo | Japan | Tokyo Dome | 360,000 / 360,000 |
| December 17, 1992 | Tokyo | Japan | Tokyo Dome | 360,000 / 360,000 |
| December 19, 1992 | Tokyo | Japan | Tokyo Dome | 360,000 / 360,000 |
| December 22, 1992 | Tokyo | Japan | Tokyo Dome | 360,000 / 360,000 |
| December 24, 1992 | Tokyo | Japan | Tokyo Dome | 360,000 / 360,000 |
| December 30, 1992 | Tokyo | Japan | Tokyo Dome | 360,000 / 360,000 |
| December 31, 1992 | Tokyo | Japan | Tokyo Dome | 360,000 / 360,000 |

List of 1993 concerts, showing date, city, country, venue, tickets sold and number of available tickets
| Date | City | Country | Venue | Attendance |
|---|---|---|---|---|
| August 24, 1993 | Bangkok | Thailand | Suphachalasai Stadium | 80,000 / 80,000 |
| August 27, 1993 (Note: Originally August 26, 1993, but was rescheduled due to dehydration.) | Bangkok | Thailand | Suphachalasai Stadium | 80,000 / 80,000 |
| August 29, 1993 | Singapore | | Singapore National Stadium | 94,000 / 94,000 |
| September 1, 1993 (Note: Originally August 30, 1993, but was rescheduled to exhaustion.) | Singapore | | Singapore National Stadium | 94,000 / 94,000 |
| September 4, 1993 | Taipei | Taiwan | Taipei Municipal Stadium | 80,000 / 80,000 |
| September 6, 1993 | Taipei | Taiwan | Taipei Municipal Stadium | 80,000 / 80,000 |
| September 10, 1993 | Fukuoka | Japan | Fukuoka Dome | 70,000 / 70,000 |
| September 11, 1993 | Fukuoka | Japan | Fukuoka Dome | 70,000 / 70,000 |
| September 15, 1993 | Moscow | Russia | Luzhniki Stadium | 70,000 / 70,000 |
| September 19, 1993 | Tel Aviv | Israel | Yarkon Park | 170,000 / 170,000 |
| September 21, 1993 | Tel Aviv | Israel | Yarkon Park | 170,000 / 170,000 |
| September 23, 1993 | Istanbul | Turkey | BJK İnönü Stadium | 56,000 / 56,000 |
| September 26, 1993 | Santa Cruz de Tenerife (Note: Santa Cruz de Tenerife is located in the Canary Islands, an archipelago in the Atlantic Ocean off the northwest coast of Africa and geographically considered part of the African continent, although it is politically and administratively an autonomous community of Spain.) | Spain | Port of Santa Cruz de Tenerife | 45,000 / 45,000 |
| October 8, 1993 | Buenos Aires | Argentina | Estadio River Plate | 240,000 / 240,000 |
| October 10, 1993 | Buenos Aires | Argentina | Estadio River Plate | 240,000 / 240,000 |
| October 12, 1993 | Buenos Aires | Argentina | Estadio River Plate | 240,000 / 240,000 |
| October 15, 1993 | São Paulo | Brazil | Estádio do Morumbi | 210,000 / 210,000 |
| October 17, 1993 | São Paulo | Brazil | Estádio do Morumbi | 210,000 / 210,000 |
| October 23, 1993 | Santiago | Chile | Estadio Nacional | 85,000 / 85,000 |
| October 29, 1993 | Mexico City | Mexico | Estadio Azteca | 550,000 / 550,000 |
| October 31, 1993 | Mexico City | Mexico | Estadio Azteca | 550,000 / 550,000 |
| November 7, 1993 (Note: Originally November 2, 1993, but was rescheduled due to Jackson's toothache.) | Mexico City | Mexico | Estadio Azteca | 550,000 / 550,000 |
| November 9, 1993 (Note: Originally November 4, 1993, but was rescheduled due to oral surgery.) | Mexico City | Mexico | Estadio Azteca | 550,000 / 550,000 |
| November 11, 1993 (Note: Originally November 6, 1993, but was rescheduled due to oral surgery.) | Mexico City | Mexico | Estadio Azteca | 550,000 / 550,000 |

== Cancelled dates ==
List of cancelled concerts, showing date, city, country, venue, and reason for cancellation
| Date | City | Country | Venue | Reason |
|---|---|---|---|---|
| September 6, 1992 | Gelsenkirchen | Germany | Parkstadion | Health issues |
| September 11, 1992 | Basel | Switzerland | St. Jakob Stadium | Health issues |
| September 24, 1992 | Seville | Spain | Estadio Benito Villamarín | Health issues |
| October 4, 1992 (Note: Originally October 2, 1992, but was rescheduled due to scheduling issues.) | İzmir | Turkey | İzmir Atatürk Stadium | Health issues |
| October 10, 1992 (Note: Originally October 8, 1992, but was rescheduled due to scheduling issues.) | Athens | Greece | Olympic Stadium | Health issues |
| August 15, 1993 | Hong Kong | | Sha Tin Racecourse | Conflicts with racing season |
| August 16, 1993 | Hong Kong | | Sha Tin Racecourse | Conflicts with racing season |
| September 30, 1993 | Johannesburg | South Africa | Johannesburg Stadium | Political issues |
| October 2, 1993 | Johannesburg | South Africa | Johannesburg Stadium | Political issues |
| October 19, 1993 | Rio de Janeiro | Brazil | Maracanã Stadium | Back injury |
| October 21, 1993 | Santiago | Chile | Estadio Nacional Julio Martínez Prádanos | Back injury |
| October 26, 1993 | Lima | Peru | Estadio Nacional del Perú | Back injury |
| November 8, 1993 | Zapopan | Mexico | Estadio Tres de Marzo | Back injury |
| November 14, 1993 | Bayamón | Puerto Rico | Estadio Juan Ramón Loubriel | Sexual abuse allegations |
| November 16, 1993 | Bayamón | Puerto Rico | Estadio Juan Ramón Loubriel | Sexual abuse allegations |
| November 19, 1993 (Note: Originally November 12, 1993, but was rescheduled due to Jackson's back injury.) | Caracas | Venezuela | Poliedro de Caracas | Sexual abuse allegations |
| November 21, 1993 | Monterrey | Mexico | Estadio de Béisbol Monterrey | Sexual abuse allegations |
| November 24, 1993 | New Delhi | India | Jawaharlal Nehru Stadium | Sexual abuse allegations |
| November 25, 1993 | New Delhi | India | Jawaharlal Nehru Stadium | Sexual abuse allegations |
| November 27, 1993 | Dubai | United Arab Emirates | Al Maktoum Stadium | Sexual abuse allegations |
| November 28, 1993 | Dubai | United Arab Emirates | Al Maktoum Stadium | Sexual abuse allegations |
| November 30, 1993 | Kuala Lumpur | Malaysia | Stadium Merdeka | Sexual abuse allegations |
| December 1, 1993 | Jakarta | Indonesia | Gelora Senayan Main Stadium | Sexual abuse allegations |
| December 2, 1993 | Jakarta | Indonesia | Gelora Senayan Main Stadium | Sexual abuse allegations |
| December 3, 1993 | Sydney | Australia | Sydney Cricket Ground | Sexual abuse allegations |
| December 4, 1993 | Sydney | Australia | Sydney Cricket Ground | Sexual abuse allegations |
| December 7, 1993 | Mulgrave | Australia | Waverley Park | Sexual abuse allegations |

== Personnel ==
Lead performer

- Lead vocals, dance and choreographer: Michael Jackson

Dancers

- LaVelle Smith (choreographer)
- Dominic Lucero (asst. choreographer;)
- Jamie King (1992 and 1993 legs)
- Eddie Garcia (1992 leg)
- Randy Allaire (1992 leg)
- Travis Payne (1993 leg)
- Jason Yribar (1993 leg)
- Bruno "Taco" Falcon (asst. choreographer; 1992 and 1993 legs)
- Michelle Berube
- Yuko Sumida
- Damon Navandi

Musicians

- Musical director: Greg Phillinganes (1992), Brad Buxer (1993)
- Assistant musical director: Kevin Dorsey
- Keyboards, synthesizers: Greg Phillinganes (1992); Brad Buxer, Isaiah Sanders (1993)
- Drums: Ricky Lawson
- Lead/rhythm guitar: Jennifer Batten (1992), Becky Barksdale (1993), David Williams
- Bass guitar, synth bass: Don Boyette

Vocalists

- Vocal director: Kevin Dorsey
- Background vocals: Darryl Phinnessee, Dorian Holley, Siedah Garrett, Kevin Dorsey

Guests

- Slash – lead guitar on "Black or White" in Oviedo (September 21, 1992) and Tokyo (December 30 and 31, 1992)

== See also ==
- List of most-attended concert tours
- List of most-attended ticketed multi-night concerts
