= Someday Out of the Blue =

2000 song by Elton John

"Someday Out of the Blue (Theme from El Dorado)"

Single by Elton John

from the album The Road to El Dorado (soundtrack)
- B-side: "Cheldorado" (Hans Zimmer/Heitor Pereira)
- Released: 14 February 2000
- Length: 4:47 (album version); 4:16 (single edit)
- Label: DreamWorks
- Composers: Elton John; Patrick Leonard
- Lyricist: Tim Rice
- Producer: Patrick Leonard

Elton John singles chronology
"A Step Too Far" (1999)	"Someday Out of the Blue (Theme from El Dorado)" (2000)	"Friends Never Say Goodbye" (2000)

Music video
- "Someday Out of the Blue" on YouTube

"Someday Out of the Blue" is a song by British singer-songwriter Elton John, recorded for the soundtrack to the film The Road to El Dorado. Written by John, Patrick Leonard, and Tim Rice, it serves as one of the themes of the film and was the first single released from the soundtrack.

"Someday Out of the Blue" reached No. 5 on the US Billboard Adult Contemporary chart and No. 49 on the Billboard Hot 100. The song was John's last appearance on the Hot 100 until "Cold Heart (Pnau remix)" charted in 2021, ending his 31 consecutive charting years streak. "Someday Out of the Blue" also reached No. 40 in Switzerland and No. 69 in Germany.

== Music video ==
The music video includes some scenes of the movie and it features John performing this song (from the background of the film) in person to being an animated character on the film. It was directed by Joseph Kahn and Bibo Bergeron.

== Live performances ==
John performed "Someday Out of the Blue" on various locations and concerts to promote the movie. However, he dropped it from his setlists later on and has not played it since 2000.

== Personnel ==
- Elton John – lead vocals, piano
- Patrick Leonard – piano, keyboards and programming
- Tim Pierce – electric guitar
- Heitor Pereira – nylon string guitar
- Dean Parks – acoustic guitar
- Curt Bisquera – drums
- Luis Conte – percussion
- Richard Page, Siedah Garrett, Lynn Davis, Kudisan Kai, Davey Johnstone, Phillip Ingram, Dorian Holley – background vocals
- Jeremy Lubbock – string arrangement

== Charts ==
=== Weekly charts ===
Chart (2000)	Peak position
Germany (GfK)	69
Switzerland (Schweizer Hitparade)	40
US Billboard Hot 100	49
US Adult Contemporary (Billboard)	5

=== Year-end charts ===
Chart (2000)	Position
US Adult Contemporary (Billboard)	16
