= The Road to El Dorado (soundtrack) =

2000 film soundtrack album

Soundtrack album by Hans Zimmer, John Powell, Elton John and Tim Rice
- Released: March 14, 2000
- Recorded: 1997–99
- Studios: Various: Johnny Yuma Recording, The Enterprise (Burbank, California) Silent Sound Studios, Purple Dragon Studios (Atlanta, Georgia) The Town House (West London) Airborne Audio (Lenexa, Kansas) Cello Studios, Mix This! Studios, Record Plant (Los Angeles, California) Sony Scoring Stage (Culver City, California) Sound Chamber (North Hollywood, California) The Warehouse Studio (Vancouver, British Columbia, Canada) AIR Studios (London)
- Genres: Rock, pop, Latin pop
- Length: 62:14
- Label: DreamWorks Records
- Producers: Patrick Leonard, Hans Zimmer, Gavin Greenaway

Hans Zimmer chronology
Chill Factor (1999)	The Road to El Dorado (2000)	Gladiator (2000)

John Powell chronology
Chill Factor (1999)	The Road to El Dorado (2000)	Chicken Run (2000)

Elton John chronology
The Muse (1999)	The Road to El Dorado (2000)	Elton John One Night Only – The Greatest Hits (2000)

Tim Rice chronology
The Lion King (1994)	The Road to El Dorado (2000)	The Nutcracker in 3D (2009)

Singles from The Road to El Dorado
- 1. "Someday Out of the Blue" Released: 2000; 2. "Friends Never Say Goodbye" Released: 2000

Professional ratings
Review scores
Source	Rating
The Encyclopedia of Popular Music	2/5 stars
AllMusic	4/5 stars

The Road to El Dorado (Original Motion Picture Soundtrack) is the soundtrack album composed by Hans Zimmer and John Powell, with songs written by Elton John and Tim Rice, for the film of the same name and released by DreamWorks Records on March 14, 2000.

== Background and release ==
Marylata Jacob, who started DreamWorks' music department in 1995, became the film's music supervisor before the script was completed. Consulting with Jeffrey Katzenberg, Jacob decided the musical approach to the film would be world music. In 1996, Tim Rice and Elton John were asked to compose seven songs which they immediately worked on. Their musical process began with Rice first writing the song lyrics and giving them to John to compose the music. John then recorded a demo which was given to the animators who storyboarded to the demo as the tempo and vocals would remain intact.

Eventually, the filmmakers decided not to follow the traditional musical approach by having the characters sing. Co-producer Bonne Radford explained, "We were trying to break free of that pattern that had been kind of adhered to in animation and really put a song where we thought it would be great... and get us through some story points." On February 20, 1999, before the release of Elton John and Tim Rice's Aida, it was announced that ten songs had been composed for El Dorado, and the film's release date had been pushed to March 2000.

The instrumental score was composed by Hans Zimmer and John Powell. John, Rice, and Zimmer had previously collaborated on the soundtrack to Disney's The Lion King (1994), another animated film. Zimmer had also previously composed the instrumental score to DreamWorks Animation's previous film The Prince of Egypt (1998).

In some instances (such as "The Trail We Blaze"), the songs have been altered musically and vocally from the way they appeared in the film. A "Cast & Crew Special Edition" recording of the soundtrack exists, but was a promo-only release. It includes the theatrical versions of the songs, including "It's Tough to Be a God" recorded by Kevin Kline and Kenneth Branagh (performed on the soundtrack by Elton John and Randy Newman), and several of the score tracks by Hans Zimmer. The Backstreet Boys provided uncredited backing vocals on "Friends Never Say Goodbye", the group is "thanked" by John following the credits in the CD booklet. The Eagles members Don Henley and Timothy B. Schmit are credited as background vocalists on the song "Without Question".

== Track listing ==
All lyrics are written by Tim Rice; all music is composed by Elton John, except where noted.

The Road to El Dorado track listing
No.	Title	Music	Length
1.	"El Dorado"		4:22
2.	"Someday Out of the Blue (Theme from El Dorado)"	John; Patrick Leonard	4:48
3.	"Without Question"		4:47
4.	"Friends Never Say Goodbye" (featuring Backstreet Boys)		4:21
5.	"The Trail We Blaze"		3:54
6.	"16th Century Man"		3:40
7.	"The Panic in Me"	John; Hans Zimmer	5:40
8.	"It's Tough to Be a God" (duet with Randy Newman)		3:50
9.	"Trust Me"		4:46
10.	"My Heart Dances"		4:51
11.	"Queen of Cities"		3:56
12.	"Cheldorado" (featuring Heitor Pereira)	Zimmer	4:26
13.	"The Brig" (featuring Triology)	Zimmer	2:58
14.	"Wonders of the New World" a. "To Shibalba" b. "Save El Dorado" c. "The Ball Game"	John Powell	5:56
Total length:			62:14

== Reception ==
Reviewing for the Chicago Tribune, Michael Wilmington gave a negative review, writing: "The John-Rice score isn't as rousingly on-target as The Lion King." Paul Clinton of CNN also unfavorably compared the Elton John–Tim Rice songs to those in The Lion King. Jay Boyar of the Orlando Sentinel stated "And if the six Elton John/Tim Rice songs are thoroughly forgettable, they lack sufficient distinction to actually become annoying." Caroline Cao of /Film said, "the songs by Elton John feel phoned in."

== Personnel ==
Credits adapted from liner notes:

=== Production ===
- Michael Ostin – A&R
- Patrick Leonard – producer
- David Channing – production assistance
- Mike Kato – project coordinator
- Katrina Leigh – project coordinator
- Thom Trumbo – project coordinator
- Janet Wolsborn – art direction
- David LaChapelle – photography
- Lyn Fey – editorial direction
- Twenty-First Artists – management for Elton John

=== Score production (tracks 12–14) ===
- Tim Rice – executive producer
- Hans Zimmer – score producer
- Gavin Greenway – score producer
- Lenny Wohl – music business affairs
- Maggie Rodford – London music coordinator
- Maylata E. Jacob – music artistic supervisor
- Michael Alexander and Moanike'ala Nakamoto – assistants to Hans Zimmer

=== Technical ===
- Bob Ludwig – mastering at Gateway Mastering (Portland, Maine)
- Bob Clearmountain – mixing (1–5, 8–14)
- Kevin Killen – mixing (6, 7)
- Dan Marnien – engineer
- John Kurlander – orchestra engineer
- David Channing – additional engineer
- Dave Ashton, Elliott Blakey, David Boucher, Greg Branson, Caram Costanzo, Peter Doell, Gordon Fordyce, Larry Gann, Andy Green, Shawn Grove, Andy Haller, Thom Kidd, Tyson Leeper, Kevin Lively, Mark Needham, John Sorenson, Tom Stanley, Matt Still and Katie Teasdale – assistant engineers
- Florian Ammon, Jake Eberle and Alan Veucasovic – additional assistance

=== Technical for score (tracks 12–14) ===
- Alan Meyerson – recording, mixing
- Jake Jackson – recording assistant
- Slamm Andrews – additional engineer
- Nick Wollage – additional engineer
- Kevin Globerman – assistant engineer
- Gregg Silk – assistant engineer
- Klaus Badelt, Justin Burnett, Bruno Roussel, James McKee Smith and Geoff Zanelli – technical music advisors

=== Musicians ===
- Elton John – vocals, acoustic piano (1, 3, 4, 6–8, 10, 11), electric piano (5, 11)
- Patrick Leonard – keyboards (1–11), programming (1–11), acoustic piano (2), electric piano (8)
- Guy Babylon – additional programming
- Paul Carrack – Hammond B3 organ (3)
- Heitor Pereira – acoustic guitar (1), nylon guitar (2, 7, 9, 10)
- James Harrah – electric guitar (1, 7), guitars (3), acoustic guitar (7)
- Dean Parks – electric guitar (1), acoustic guitar (2), guitars (5)
- David Williams – electric guitar (1, 9)
- Tim Pierce – electric guitar (2, 9, 11), bouzouki (3), guitars (5)
- Davey Johnstone – guitars (3–5), mandolin (4), electric guitar (6, 9–11)
- Bruce Gaitsch – guitars (5)
- Marty Rifkin – pedal steel guitar (11)
- Marcus Miller – bass guitar (1)
- Bob Birch – bass guitar (3, 6)
- Jimmy Johnson – bass guitar (4, 10, 11)
- Guy Pratt – bass guitar (9)
- Curt Bisquera – drums (1, 2, 6–9, 11)
- Vinnie Colaiuta – drums (3, 4, 9)
- Jim Keltner – drums (5), additional drums (6), percussion (6)
- Abe Laboriel Jr. – drums (10), shaker (10)
- Luis Conte – percussion (1–5, 7, 8, 10, 11)
- Jeff Beal – trumpet (1, 9)
- Jeremy Lubbock – string arrangements (2, 4, 5, 9), orchestral arrangements (3, 7, 8, 10, 11)

=== Background and guest vocalists ===
- Davey Johnstone – backing vocals (1, 2, 5–7, 11)
- Jon Joyce – backing vocals (1, 9, 10)
- Kipp Lennon – backing vocals (1, 5, 9, 10)
- Richard Page – backing vocals (1, 2, 5–10)
- Lynn Davis – backing vocals (2, 6–8)
- Siedah Garrett – backing vocals (2, 5–8)
- Dorian Holley – backing vocals (2, 6–8)
- Phillip Ingram – backing vocals (2, 6)
- Kudisan Kai – backing vocals (2, 5–8)
- Don Henley – backing vocals (3)
- Timothy B. Schmit – backing vocals (3)
- Nigel Olsson – backing vocals (5, 11)
- Jim Gilstrap – backing vocals (7, 8)
- Randy Newman – vocals (8)

=== Score performers (tracks 12–14) ===
- Heitor Pereira – guitars, guitar solo (12)
- Triology:
  - Tristan Schulze – cello
  - Aleskey Igudesman – violin
  - Daisy Jopling – violin

Score orchestration

- Bruce Fowler – orchestration
- Elizabeth Finch, Walt Fowler, Sayuri Kawada, Ladd McIntosh, Yvonne S. Moriarty and Jack Smalley – additional orchestrations
- Rupert Gregson-Williams and Gavin Greenway – conductors
- Tonia Davall – London orchestra and vocal contractor
- Tony Stanton – music preparation
- Thomas Broderick – music production services
- Adam Smalley – supervising music editor

== Accolades ==
Award	Category	Nominee(s)	Result	Ref.
Annie Awards	Outstanding Individual Achievement for Music in an Animated Feature Production	Hans Zimmer & John Powell / Elton John & Tim Rice	Nominated	
Critics' Choice Awards	Best Composer	Hans Zimmer (Also for Gladiator and Mission: Impossible 2)	Won	
Golden Reel Awards	Best Sound Editing – Music – Animated Feature	Adam Milo Smalley and Vicki Hiatt	Nominated	
Saturn Awards	Best Music	Hans Zimmer and John Powell	Nominated	
