= In the Closet =

- Original album artwork by Mark Ryden

Single by Michael Jackson

from the album Dangerous
- Released: April 13, 1992
- Recorded: March–May 1991
- Genre: New jack swing
- Length: 6:31 (album version); 4:49 (single version)
- Label: Epic
- Songwriters: Michael Jackson; Teddy Riley
- Producers: Michael Jackson; Teddy Riley

Michael Jackson singles chronology
"Remember the Time" (1992)	"In the Closet" (1992)	"Jam" (1992)

Music video
- "In the Closet" on YouTube

"In the Closet" is a song by the American singer Michael Jackson, released on April 13, 1992, by Epic Records, as the third single from his eighth album, Dangerous (1991). It was written and produced by Jackson and Teddy Riley. It was intended as a duet between Michael Jackson and Madonna, but instead features female vocals by "Mystery Girl", who was later revealed to be Princess Stéphanie of Monaco.

In the US, "In the Closet" was the album's third consecutive Top 10 single, reaching number six on the US Billboard Hot 100. It also became its second number-one R&B single. It reached number eight on the UK singles Chart, number one in Greece and number two in Italy and Spain. In 2006, it re-entered the UK chart, reaching number 20. Its music video was directed by Herb Ritts and features the British supermodel Naomi Campbell.

== Background ==
"In the Closet" was conceived as a duet between Jackson and Madonna. She said in a 1992 interview that she worked on some lyrical ideas, but when she presented them to Jackson, he decided they were too provocative and they decided not to continue.

"In the Closet" is about keeping a relationship secret between lovers. "In the closet" is an English idiom used when one is not open about an aspect of one's life, particularly in regard to sexual orientation. Despite the song's suggestive name, its lyrics do not allude to hidden sexual orientation but rather a concealed relationship; "Don't hide our love / Woman to man." The New York Times stated, "Only Jackson would use that title for a heterosexual love song..." The female vocal was credited to "Mystery Girl" who was later revealed to be Princess Stéphanie of Monaco.

== Critical reception ==
Professional ratings
Review scores
Source	Rating
AllMusic	2.5/5 stars

In a retrospective review, Chris Lacy from Albumism described "In the Closet" as a "hormone-soaked dance track". AllMusic editor Stephen Thomas Erlewine wrote that this song is fine and there's a lot to be said for professional craftsmanship at its peak and he highlighted it. Upon the release, Larry Flick from Billboard magazine felt the third single from Dangerous "proves to be his strongest single to date." He added, "Jackson's signature whoops and whispers are put at home within an intense and unusual jack-swing/funk arrangement. The track is brightened by an immediately memorable, sing-along chorus. Of course, much speculation surrounds the identity of the "mystery girl" who chats and groans in the background. Any ideas?" Clark and DeVaney from Cash Box commented, "Okay, we heard this song when the album first came out, except it only was the one mix, this CD single contains seven mixes of various lengths totaling almost 45 minutes of the same whispering, whining, heavy breathing and mouth noises that seem to make perfect sense when considering it's Michael Jackson doing a song called 'In the Closet'. To find out what the hell it's all about, we'll have to watch the video premiere on Fox after The Simpsons."

American essayist and music journalist Robert Christgau observed of the parent album, "he's hawking the most credible sex-and-romance of his career. 'In the Closet' implores his mystery woman to keep their—get this—'lust' behind closed doors. Soon he's going wild, or fabricating desperate nostalgia for their used-to-be." The Daily Vault's Michael R. Smith called it a "tongue-firmly-in-cheek hit". Pan-European magazine Music & Media stated that the song "is aimed at fast footwork reminiscent of his sister Janet's style." A reviewer from People Magazine complimented the "catchy chorus" as an "appealing element". Alan Light of Rolling Stone said "we get repressed lust in the titillatingly titled (and determinedly heterosexual)" song. He added that it has a "snaky, unexpected bridge."

== Music video ==
The accompanying sepia colored music video for "In the Closet" was directed by Herb Ritts and features Jackson performing sensual dance routines with supermodel Naomi Campbell. Princess Stéphanie of Monaco doesn't appear in the video; her vocals were re-recorded by Campbell for the video. The short film was shot in late February and early March 1992 just northwest of Bombay Beach a small town on the Salton Sea in the Colorado Desert of California, and premiered on April 23, 1992. The video was later published by Vevo on YouTube in 2010.

== Formats and track listings ==
- In the Closet (UK single)
1. "In the Closet" (7" Edit) – 4:49
2. "In the Closet" (Club Mix) – 8:00
3. "In the Closet" (The Underground Mix) – 5:32
4. "In the Closet" (Touch Me Dub) – 7:53
5. "In the Closet" (KI's 12") – 6:55
6. "In the Closet" (The Promise) – 7:18
- In the Closet (US CD single 49K74267)
1. "In the Closet" (Club Edit) – 4:07
2. "In the Closet" (The Underground Mix) – 5:34
3. "In the Closet" (The Promise) – 7:20
4. "In the Closet" (The Vow) – 4:49
5. "Remember The Time" (New Jack Jazz Mix) – 5:06
- In the Closet (US promo CD single ESK4537)
1. "In the Closet" (Radio Edit) – 4:37 (trayliner lists a time of 4:16)
2. "In the Closet" (7" Edit) – 4:49
3. "In the Closet" (The Mission Radio Edit) – 4:28
4. "In the Closet" (KI's 12") – 7:17 (trayliner lists a time of 6:57)
5. "In the Closet" (The Newark Mix) – 7:08 (trayliner lists a time of 6:51)
6. "In the Closet" (Freestyle Mix) – 6:34 (trayliner lists a time of 6:26)
7. "In the Closet" (The Mission) – 9:26
- In the Closet: Mixes Behind Door #1 (Japanese CD single ESCA5610)
1. "In the Closet" (Club Mix) – 8:03
2. "In the Closet" (The Underground Mix) – 5:40
3. "In the Closet" (Touch Me Dub) – 6:42
4. "In the Closet" (KI's 12") – 7:17
- In the Closet: Mixes Behind Door #2 (Japanese CD single ESCA5611)
1. "In the Closet" (The Mission) – 9:27
2. "In the Closet" (Freestyle Mix) – 6:35
3. "In the Closet" (The Mix of Life) – 7:41
4. "In the Closet" (The Underground Dub) – 6:27
- In the Closet: Mixes Behind Door #3 (Japanese CD single ESCA5622)
1. "In the Closet" (Club Edit) – 4:11
2. "In the Closet" (The Newark Mix) – 7:09
3. "In the Closet" (The Promise) – 7:26
4. "In the Closet" (The Vow) – 4:53
5. "Remember The Time" (New Jack Jazz 21) – 5:06
- In the Closet (UK PAL Visionary DualDisc single 82876773342 5)

CD side

1. "In the Closet" (7" Edit) – 4:47
2. "In the Closet" (Club Mix) – 8:02

DVD side

1. "In the Closet" (Music video) – 6:02
- In the Closet (US NTSC Visionary DualDisc single 82876773352 4)

CD side

1. "In the Closet" (7" Edit) – 4:47
2. "In the Closet" (Club Mix) – 8:02

DVD side

1. "In the Closet" (Music video) – 6:02

(Note: In the US Visionary was only sold as the complete boxset. Individual DualDiscs were not able to be purchased)

== Personnel ==
Personnel are adapted from the album Dangerous.

- Produced by Teddy Riley and Michael Jackson
- Recorded and mixed by Bruce Swedien and Teddy Riley
- Lead and background vocals, and vocal arrangement by Michael Jackson
- Duet vocals by Mystery Girl (Princess Stéphanie of Monaco)
- Rhythm arrangement, synthesizer arrangement, keyboards, and synthesizers by Teddy Riley

== Charts ==
=== Weekly charts ===
Weekly chart performance
Chart (1992–1993)	Peak position
Australia (ARIA)	5
Austria (Ö3 Austria Top 40)	23
Belgium (Ultratop 50 Flanders)	14
Canada Top Singles (RPM)	16
Canada Dance/Urban (RPM)	2
Canada Retail Singles (The Record)	13
Canada Contemporary Hit Radio (The Record)	6
Europe (Eurochart Hot 100)	11
Europe (European Dance Radio)	3
Europe (European Hit Radio)	2
Finland (Suomen virallinen singlelista)	5
France (SNEP)	9
Germany (GfK)	15
Greece (IFPI)	1
Ireland (IRMA)	4
Israel (Israeli Singles Chart)	11
Italy (Musica e dischi)	2
Netherlands (Dutch Top 40)	9
Netherlands (Single Top 100)	9
New Zealand (Recorded Music NZ)	5
Norway (VG-lista)	10
Spain (AFYVE)	9
Sweden (Sverigetopplistan)	29
Switzerland (Schweizer Hitparade)	25
UK Singles (Official Charts)	8
UK Airplay (Music Week)	2
UK Dance (Music Week)	22
UK Club Chart (Music Week)	12
US Billboard Hot 100	6
US 12-inch Singles Sales (Billboard)	1
US Dance Club Play (Billboard)	1
US Hot R&B Singles (Billboard)	1
US Cash Box Top 100	6

2006 weekly chart performance
Chart (2006)	Peak position
France (SNEP)	63
Ireland (IRMA)	25
Italy (FIMI)	9
Netherlands (Single Top 100)	36
Spain (Promusicae)	2
UK Singles (Official Charts)	20

=== Year-end charts ===
Year-end chart performance
Chart (1992)	Position
Australia (ARIA)	53
Belgium (Ultratop 50 Flanders)	99
Europe (Eurochart Hot 100)	61
Germany (Media Control)	66
UK Airplay (Music Week)	70
US Billboard Hot 100	66
US Hot R&B Singles (Billboard)	52
US Maxi-Singles Sales (Billboard)	19

== Certifications ==
Certifications and sales
Region	Certification	Certified units/sales
Australia (ARIA)	Gold	35,000^{^}
United States (RIAA)	Gold	500,000^{^}
^{^} Shipments figures based on certification alone.

== Release history ==
Release dates and formats
Region	Date	Format(s)	Label(s)	Ref(s).
United Kingdom	April 13, 1992	7-inch vinyl; 12-inch vinyl; CD; cassette	Epic	
Australia	April 1992	CD; cassette	Epic	
Japan	May 8, 1992	Mini-CD	Epic	
Japan	June 21, 1992	3× remix CDs	Epic	

== See also ==
- List of number-one dance singles of 1992 (U.S.)
- List of number-one R&B singles of 1992 (U.S.)
