= Jam (Michael Jackson song) =

Single by Michael Jackson

from the album Dangerous
- Released: June 19, 1992
- Recorded: 1990 – July 1991
- Genre: New jack swing; hip-hop; funk
- Length: 5:40 (album version); 4:10 (7-inch edit)
- Label: Epic
- Songwriters: Michael Jackson; René Moore; Bruce Swedien; Teddy Riley
- Producers: Michael Jackson; Teddy Riley; Bruce Swedien; René Moore

Michael Jackson singles chronology
"In the Closet" (1992)	"Jam" (1992)	"Who Is It" (1992)

Music video
- "Jam" on YouTube

"Jam" is a song by the American singer and songwriter Michael Jackson, released in June 1992 by Epic Records as the fourth single from his eighth album, Dangerous (1991). It was co-written and co-produced by Jackson with René Moore, Bruce Swedien and Teddy Riley.

"Jam" is a new jack swing, hip-hop and funk song whose bridge features a rap verse performed by Heavy D (of the group Heavy D & the Boyz). The music video of the song featured NBA basketball legend Michael Jordan. The song was also featured on the Chicago Bulls (Jordan's team at the time)'s 1992 NBA Championship video "Untouchabulls" and was also used in many promotional ads of the NBA.

"Jam" was a Top 40 hit across the world, peaking at number 26 on the US Billboard Hot 100. It received generally positive reviews by critics and received two Grammy Award nominations. The song re-entered the UK Singles Chart in 2006, reaching number 22. In the same year, it also reached number one in Spain.

It also appears as the second track on his 2009 This Is It compilation album. The single was re-released in 2006 as part of Jackson's Visionary: The Video Singles collection campaign, and it was remixed to the Cirque du Soleil's Immortal World Tour, releasing that remix on the soundtrack album.

== Background ==
"Jam" began as a fast-paced experimental demo titled "Time Marches On" recorded by Bruce Swedien and René Moore for the latter's planned solo album. The track underwent multiple early iterations in the studio, with the looped drum beat being slowed down and further built up with elements including Swedien's sleigh bells. Swedien and Moore presented the finished beat to Jackson, who loved it and decided to use it for Dangerous. Jackson later gave the drum beat to Teddy Riley, who further embellished it with keyboards, horn stabs and guitar parts to develop the final backing track, and Jackson wrote the lyrics.

== Critical reception ==
"Jam" was generally well received by music critics. Larry Flick from Billboard magazine wrote that the song "is fortified with brassy horns, a funky bass line, and a rap cameo by Heavy D. Jackson's signature squeals and whoops are at home within an urgent groove that seems to goad him to the point of catharsis." Andrew Smith from Melody Maker described it as "lean" and "spikey". Pan-European magazine Music & Media commented, "Get in the groove with the most funky track on the Dangerous album." An editor from People Magazine felt Jackson "captures the outer style but not the energizing spirit of hip-hop."

Alan Light from Rolling Stone praised the song, adding that it "addresses Jackson's uneasy relationship to the world and reveals a canny self-awareness that carries the strongest message on Dangerous." He wrote further, "Though it initially sounds like a simple, funky dance vehicle, Jackson's voice bites into each phrase with a desperation that urges us to look deeper. He is singing as 'false prophets cry of doom' and exhorts us to 'live each day like it's the last'. The chorus declares that the miseries of the world 'ain't too much stuff' to stop us from jamming. To Jackson, who insists that he comes truly alive only onstage, the ability to 'Jam' is the sole means to find 'peace within myself', and this hope rings more sincere than the childlike wishes found in the ballads." Ted Shaw from The Windsor Star noted that Jackson's voice is treated electronically on the track, "which establishes the thematic thrust in lyrics that call for brotherly love."

== Retrospective response ==
In a 2016 retrospective review, Chris Lacy from Albumism said that on "Jam", Jackson "explains that jamming (the joy of music and dance) is his preferred method of temporarily escaping worldly issues." AllMusic editor Stephen Thomas Erlewine cited the song as an example of "professional craftsmanship at its peak" and called it "blistering." Adam Gilham of Sputnikmusic described the track as a perfect album opener and rated it "5/5".

== Music video ==
The accompanying music video for "Jam" takes place within an abandoned indoor basketball court, where Jackson teaches basketball legend Michael Jordan how to dance, and in return, Jordan teaches Jackson how to play basketball. Special effects have Jackson throwing a basketball through a window and scoring in the hoop in the opposite room, as well as Jackson scoring by tossing the ball behind him and kicking the ball into the hoop with his heel. The extended versions of the video include Jackson teaching Jordan how to do the physically complicated moonwalk dance technique (known as the slide step). The rap groups Kris Kross and Naughty by Nature made a cameo appearance, as does Heavy D (who performs a rap during the bridge).

The video was included on Dangerous: The Short Films and Michael Jackson's Vision. The music video was directed by David Kellogg and was filmed on April 20, 1992, in Chicago, Illinois. The music video premiered on Fox on June 19, 1992, at 9:30 p.m. EST.

== Live performances ==
Jackson performed "Jam" as the opening number throughout his Dangerous World Tour. He also performed it at the Royal Brunei Concert in 1996, which turned out to be the last live performance of the song. A portion of the song was performed at the start of the 1993 Super Bowl halftime show. The song was prepared for the This Is It concert series, with a snippet of "Another Part of Me", however the shows were cancelled due to Jackson's death.

== Track listings and formats ==
- Jam - Remastered Version, UK CD, Single Epic – (658360 6), Epic – (31-658360-20), Europe Single Epic – (658360 6), Epic – (31-658360-20) & South Korea Epic – (CPL-1307) /Australia Cassettes, Singles Epic – (658228 4)
1. "Jam" (Remastered Version) – 5:38
2. "Wanna Be Startin' Somethin'" – 6:02
3. "Beat It" – 4:18
4. "In the Closet" – 6:32
5. "Remember the Time" – 4:00
6. "Rock with You" (Remix) – (Nico Miseria & Sandro Jeeawock) – 3:08
7. "Come Together" – 4:02
- Jam (UK CD single 6583602)
1. "Jam" (7" Edit) – 4:10
2. "Jam" (Roger's Jeep Mix) – 5:54
3. "Jam" (Atlanta Techno Dub) – 5:16 (incorrectly listed on insert as "Atlantan Techno Mix")
4. "Wanna Be Startin' Somethin'" (Brothers in Rhythm House Mix) – 7:40
- Jam (US CD single 49K74334)
1. "Jam" (Roger's Jeep Radio Mix) – 3:57
2. "Jam" (Silky 7" Mix) – 4:17
3. "Jam" (Roger's Club Mix) – 6:20
4. "Jam" (Atlanta Techno Mix) – 6:06
5. "Rock with You" (Masters at Work Remix) – 5:29
- Jam (US promo CD single ESK6754)
1. "Jam" (Roger's Jeep Radio Mix) – 3:57
2. "Jam" (Teddy's Jam) – 5:48
3. "Jam" (7" Edit) – 4:10
4. "Jam" (MJ's Raw Mix) – 4:24
5. "Jam" (Teddy's 12" Mix) – 5:42
6. "Jam" (Roger's Jeep Mix) – 5:54
7. "Jam" (Percapella) – 5:29
8. "Jam" (Radio Edit Without Rap) – 4:44
- Jam (US VHS promo single ESK8880)
1. "Jam" (music video) – 8:00
- Jam (2006 DualDisc single ESK4583)

CD side

1. "Jam" (7" Edit) – 4:10
2. "Jam" (Silky 12" Mix) – 6:28

DVD side

1. "Jam" (music video) – 8:00

=== Notes ===
Rock With You (Masters At Work Remix) and Jam (Teddy’s Jam) appeared on the Australian Collector’s Edition bonus disc of Dangerous which was released for a limited time in 1993.

== Personnel ==
- Song and lyrics by Michael Jackson
- Music by René Moore, Bruce Swedien, Michael Jackson and Teddy Riley
- Produced by Michael Jackson, Teddy Riley and Bruce Swedien Co/Producer Renee Moore
- Solo and background vocals by Michael Jackson
- Recorded and mixed by Bruce Swedien, Teddy Riley and Dave Way
- Arrangement by Michael Jackson, Bruce Swedien, Teddy Riley and René Moore
- Vocal arrangement by Michael Jackson
- Rap performed by Heavy D
- Rene Moore, Teddy Riley, Bruce Swedien and Brad Buxer: Keyboards
- Teddy Riley, Rhett Lawrence, Michael Boddicker and Brad Buxer: Synthesizers
- Teddy Riley and Bruce Swedien: Drums
- Teddy Riley: Guitar

== Charts ==
=== Weekly charts ===
Weekly chart performance
Chart (1992)	Peak position
Australia (ARIA)	11
Austria (Ö3 Austria Top 40)	28
Belgium (Ultratop 50 Flanders)	10
Canada Top Singles (RPM)	29
Canada Dance/Urban (RPM)	3
Canada Contemporary Hit Radio (The Record)	8
Canada Retail Singles (The Record)	21
Ecuador (UPI)	3
Europe (Eurochart Hot 100)	21
Europe (European Dance Radio)	5
Finland (Suomen virallinen lista)	18
France (SNEP)	8
Germany (GfK)	18
Greece (Pop + Rock)	8
Ireland (IRMA)	5
Italy (Musica e dischi)	3
Netherlands (Dutch Top 40)	9
Netherlands (Single Top 100)	12
New Zealand (Recorded Music NZ)	2
Portugal (AFP)	6
Sweden (Sverigetopplistan)	30
Switzerland (Schweizer Hitparade)	22
UK Singles (Official Charts)	13
UK Airplay (Music Week)	2
UK Dance (Music Week)	8
UK Club Chart (Music Week)	10
US Billboard Hot 100	26
US Dance Club Songs (Billboard)	4
US Dance Singles Sales (Billboard)	1
US Hot R&B/Hip-Hop Songs (Billboard)	3
US Cash Box Top 100	21
US CHR/Pop Airplay Chart (Radio & Records)	9

2006 weekly chart performance
Chart (2006)	Peak position
France (SNEP)	55
Ireland (IRMA)	22
Italy (FIMI)	11
Netherlands (Single Top 100)	42
Spain (Promusicae)	1
UK Singles (Official Charts)	22

=== Year-end charts ===
Year-end chart performance
Chart (1992)	Position
Australia (ARIA)	77
Canada Dance/Urban (RPM)	46
US Hot R&B Singles (Billboard)	85
US Maxi-Singles Sales (Billboard)	21
