= Cory Cullinan =

Cory Cullinan is an American singer-songwriter. He is best known for creating educational musical productions that combine orchestral music, storytelling, and theatrical performance, particularly through his children's entertainment project Doctor Noize.

== Early life and education ==
Cullinan developed an interest in music at an early age, writing songs as a child and pursuing both performance and composition throughout his youth. He attended Stanford University, where he studied music and political science while also conducting research at the university's Center for Computer Research in Music and Acoustics (CCRMA). During his undergraduate years, Cullinan began composing works that blended traditional songwriting with emerging music technology, an approach that would characterize much of his later career. One of his later works, Footprint (2025), originated from musical ideas first developed during his time at Stanford. Following his undergraduate studies, Cullinan continued to develop his expertise in recording arts and music production, later completing graduate work in recording arts that supported his transition into higher education as both a producer and professor.

== Career ==
Cullinan began his professional career as a songwriter and independent recording artist during the 1990s. He founded Pictoria Records and the independent music publishing company Cullinan Diamonds, releasing original music while producing recordings for other artists. His early solo work included the album My Oyster, which helped establish his reputation as an independent musician and producer.

In 2007, Cullinan created the children's educational music project Doctor Noize, which became the central focus of his career. Through Doctor Noize, he produced albums, books, theatrical performances, and educational programs designed to introduce children to music, creativity, and orchestral performance. His production, Phineas McBoof Crashes the Symphony, combines live orchestra, storytelling, visual art, and audience participation to introduce young audiences to classical music and the instruments of the orchestra. The production has been performed in collaboration with symphony orchestras throughout the United States.

In 2013, Cullinan launched a Kickstarter campaign to fund Phineas McBoof Crashes the Symphony. Although the campaign initially struggled to gain support, it ultimately raised more than US$110,000. The campaign later became the subject of a longitudinal academic case study examining crowdfunding, entrepreneurial identity, and community engagement. Cullinan established Reach Studios, a recording and production facility where he has continued producing music, educational media, and commercial projects. He has also remained active as a public speaker, producer, and consultant in music technology and arts education.

His 2025 experimental short film and single 2025 Alive, featuring vocalist Riley Max, combined music, surreal imagery, and contemporary news footage to examine themes of uncertainty, media saturation, and human connection. Earlier that year, he released Footprint, an environmentally themed music video reflecting on humanity's relationship with nature. The work drew upon material originally composed during his undergraduate years at Stanford and combined musique concrète composition with contemporary visual storytelling. Both videos were directed by his daughter Sidney Cullinan. Cullinan has also collaborated with his daughter, recording artist Riley Max, on live performances and recordings, including a Father's Day concert celebrating their family collaboration and independent musical projects.

== Discography ==
Selected releases include My Oyster; Soundtracks; the Doctor Noize series of children's albums; the singles "The Sea," "Offshore," "Secret Mechanisms," "Green by Design," "2025 Alive" (featuring Riley Max), and "Footprint."
