= Chicken Run (soundtrack) =

2000 film soundtrack album

Chicken Run (Original Motion Picture Soundtrack)

Soundtrack album by John Powell and Harry Gregson-Williams
- Released: 20 June 2000
- Recorded: 2000
- Studios: Abbey Road Studios, London
- Genre: Film score
- Length: 62:21
- Label: RCA Victor
- Producers: John Powell; Harry Gregson-Williams

Harry Gregson-Williams chronology
The Magic of Marciano (2000)	Chicken Run (2000)	Shrek (2001)

John Powell chronology
The Road to El Dorado (2000)	Chicken Run (2000)	Just Visiting (2001)

Chicken Run (Original Motion Picture Soundtrack) is the soundtrack album composed by John Powell and Harry Gregson-Williams for the film of the same name and released by RCA Victor on 20 June 2000.

== Background ==
The film score is composed by John Powell and Harry Gregson-Williams, who previously collaborated on the DreamWorks Animation film Antz (1998). Like their previous film, Gregson-Williams wrote the primary themes whereas Powell would work on the large character themes, and both composers worked on the main theme. The score was recorded at the Abbey Road Studios in London. Powell incorporated the use of kazoos and whistles for more fun elements, and added that in the track "Building the Crate", he had used a kazoo orchestra to record the cue, which the players had enjoyed. The score further emphasized the use of brass, owing to Powell liking the sound of brass, having mentioned his father being a brass player. The opening sequences had the score from The Great Escape (1963) as a placeholder, which the composers tried hard to crack and it took them months to work on the opening piece. At one point, the directors had tried to acquire the piece, as they didn't think about the composers cracking the theme.

== Release ==
RCA Victor released the Chicken Run soundtrack on 20 June 2000, featuring 18 tracks from Powell and Gregson-Williams' score, and two songs "Flip, Flip and Fly" by Ellis Hall and "The Wanderer" by Dion DiMucci.

== Reception ==
Jonathan Broxton of Movie Music UK wrote "Jaded collectors who thought that innovation was dead in modern film scoring need look no further than the work of John Powell and Harry Gregson-Williams for proof that, when presented with the right project and the right set of circumstances, the composers of today can compete with the best that film music has ever offered." Thomas Glorieux of Maintitles wrote "Frankly, it is still a sign that Chicken Run works so well even after all this time, showing Harry Gregson-Williams was back then a lot more inspired than today, and that John Powell was just warming up what was going to become one amazing career. Yet both complemented each other so well that I don't mind seeing them together in one movie once again, because even the collaboration after that (Shrek) was worthy of some acclaim. However giving some acclaim is the least you can do when hearing, adoring and liking everything that Chicken Run has to offer" calling it "one of the biggest fun scores ever written".

Christian Clemmensen of Filmtracks wrote "Chicken Run is extremely likable in character and a technical marvel in its orchestration and outstanding recording quality. It is, however, an overload of orchestral bombast and energy, with just too much flair to hold together for some listeners. As well as the composers succeed in their satirical tributes, it is this exact constant throughout Chicken Run that makes it a difficult score to enjoy unless you're looking for music that will consume all of your concentration [...] for enthusiasts of highly sophisticated orchestral comedy and satire, Chicken Run will crank you up." Heather Phares of AllMusic wrote "Chicken Run's soaring, symphonic pieces—which were composed and arranged by John Powell and Harry Gregson-Willamson—are an affectionate homage to the golden age of film music. A must for fans of the movie, as well as aficionados of great movie music in general." David A. Koran of Soundtrack.Net wrote "Chicken Run proves that pairing these two guys up again can prove better than their work on their last collaboration Antz, which was also released by Dreamworks."

== Track listing ==
No.	Title	Artist(s)	Length
1.	"Opening Titles"		3:39
2.	"Main Titles"		3:24
3.	"The Evil Mrs. Tweedy"		4:22
4.	"Rats!"		1:09
5.	"Chickens Are Not Organized"		1:02
6.	"We Need A Miracle"		2:03
7.	"Rocky & the Circus"		3:51
8.	"Flight Training"		3:39
9.	"A Really Big Truck Arrives"		5:56
10.	"Cocktails & Flighty Thoughts"		1:58
11.	"Babs' Big Break"		1:40
12.	"Flip, Flop & Fly"	Ellis Hall	2:10
13.	"Up On The Roof"		3:08
14.	"Into The Pie Machine"		3:10
15.	"Rocky, A Fake All Along"		3:28
16.	"Building the Crate"		3:32
17.	"The Wanderer"	Dion DiMucci	2:48
18.	"The Chickens are Revolting"		2:45
19.	"Lift Off!"		3:41
20.	"Escape To Paradise"		4:59
Total length:			62:21

== Personnel ==
Credits adapted from liner notes:

- Music composer, arranger and producer – John Powell, Harry Gregson-Williams
- Conductors – Harry Gregson-Williams, Gavin Greenaway, Nick Ingman
- Orchestrators – John Powell, Harry Gregson-Williams, Bruce L. Fowler, Elizabeth Finch, Harry Kim, Ladd McIntosh, Yvonne S. Moriarty
- Contractor – Isobel Griffiths
- Score readers – Harry Gregson-Williams, Alastair King
- Compiler – Gavin Greenaway
- Engineers – Andy Dudman, Chris Clark
- Recording – Nick Wollage, Alan Meyerson
- Mixing – Nick Wollage
- Mastering – Nick Webb
- Supervising music editor – Richard Whitfield
- Music editor – Bruno Roussel, Vicki Hiatt
- Musical assistance – Geoff Zanelli, James McKee Smith, Steve Jablonsky
- Production services – Media Ventures
- Music supervisor – Marylata E. Jacob
- Copyist – Tony Stanton
- Art direction – Rich Dombrowski
- A&R – Bill Rosenfield

== Accolades ==
Group	Category (Recipient)	Result
Phoenix Film Critics	Best Original Score (John Powell and Harry Gregson-Williams)	Nominated
