= Dorian Holley =

American musician

- Born: Dorian Jose Holley; July 1, 1956 (age 70); Los Angeles, California, U.S.
- Occupations: Singer; vocal coach
- Years active: 1985–present
- Website: dorianholleymusic.com
- Children: 3

Dorian Jose Holley is an American musician, backing singer, and a vocal coach. He began his professional career as a backing vocalist for Michael Jackson, who was one of the greatest entertainers of his era, during Jackson's Bad world tour in 1987. Jackson staged a series of live concerts for audiences around the world including British royalty. Holley traveled with Jackson for all of his subsequent world tours. Holley performed with other artists such as Rod Stewart in 1991 and James Taylor in 1994 and since 2019. In 1991, Holley was the singing voice of Choir Boy in the Robert Townsend movie, The Five Heartbeats. Holley's stage presence and vocal ability were praised by music critics during these performances.

Holley auditioned to become a featured vocalist on the reality television show Dancing with the Stars. He served in that capacity for the first three seasons of the American series and worked for several years as an associate music director and vocal coach for the singing competition show, American Idol. He worked there with the contestants before and after they appeared before the show's judges and the worldwide television audience.

In 2008, Holley released his debut album, Independent Film. In 2009, he worked with Jackson for the last time, in preparation for the entertainer's ill-fated concert series This Is It. Holley was to serve as a backing vocalist, as well as the vocal director for the shows. Jackson's death forced the concerts to be canceled. In 2010, Holley host a weekend at the LA Music Academy called "The Art of the Audition". As of 2011, he was the vocalist for the house band on The Tonight Show with Jay Leno led by Rickey Minor. He is also the Artist Development Director at Los Angeles Music Academy College of Music and teaches in the school's vocal department. Dorian is married to trial attorney Shawn Holley, who has represented Jackson and been a chief legal correspondent for the E!, a tv network.

== Career ==
=== Michael Jackson's Bad tour ===
Holley first performed with Michael Jackson during the entertainer's first solo concert series, the Bad world tour. Beginning in Japan in September 1987, the tour lasted for 16 months and during that time he visited 15 countries while serving as a backing singer for Jackson, along with Kevin Dorsey, Darryl Phinnessee, and Sheryl Crow. As part of the tour, he performed for over 4 million people, including Charles and Diana, Prince and Princess of Wales. The Bad tour concluded several months later in January 1989.

English singer and musician Rod Stewart enlisted the services of Holley and Phinnessee in 1991, when Stewart toured the U.S. The two (Holley and Phinnessee) were part of an 11-man backing ensemble, when Stewart performed at the Pacific Amphitheatre in Costa Mesa, California and other cities in California in September 1991. During the show's encore, Stewart performed his signature song "Twistin' the Night Away". The Los Angeles Times described in a review of the concert that the song was "embellished with a delicious a cappella doo-wop break featuring the 46-year-old star and backup singers Darryl Phinnessee and Dorian Holley". The two vocalists were lauded by the Chicago Tribune after a performance at the Poplar Creek Music Theatre, where their "sublime harmonies" "formed a perfect counterpoint to Stewart's impassioned pleas on 'This Old Heart of Mine'". The San Jose Mercury News said that Holley and Phinnessee were "great".

=== Dangerous World Tour, HIStory World Tour and touring with James Taylor ===
Holley worked with Jackson during the Dangerous World Tour (June 1992–November 1993), a 69 date concert series which was attended by almost 3.5 million fans. The tour was cut short after child sexual abuse allegations were leveled against Jackson. Jackson canceled the remainder of the tour due to the stress caused by the accusations.

Dorian is mature and intelligent, and that comes through in an ineffable way when he sings. That said, he can also put it on hold and be one-dimensional and shallow if he has to. Dorian is a real utility player.

— James Taylor

In 1994, Dorian Holley joined with Kate Markowitz, Valerie Carter, and David Lasley to form what The Pantagraph and The Boston Globe respectively described as a "wonderful" and "angelic" backing group to James Taylor. While on tour with Taylor, several news sources praised Holley's vocal ability. The Roanoke Times stated that the highlight of the show at the Roanoke Civic Center was the performance of "Shower the People", which "showcased the singing" of Holley. The St. Louis Post-Dispatch said during a performance of the same song at Riverport Amphitheater that the backing vocalist "sang a spirited solo that drew an ovation equal to anything Taylor had drawn thus far". He returned in 2019 when Arnold McCuller was busy touring with Phil Collins. Since McCuller’s retirement, Holley has performed the Coda for “Shower the People”.

Holley worked with Jackson again for the entertainer's last concert series, the HIStory World Tour, which began in Prague in September 1996. The tour attracted more than 4.5 million fans from 58 cities in 35 countries around the world and concluded in Durban, South Africa in October 1997.

=== Reality television work ===
Holley auditioned to become a featured vocalist on the American reality television show Dancing with the Stars. The audition was performed in seven different rounds, performing music including Frank Sinatra's and Sly Stone's. He was successful and became a featured singer during the first three seasons of the series. Holley later noted that the concept of diversity in vocal performance was not a new experience for him. "I've been at sessions where a producer has said he wants me to sound like Michael Jackson and Bruce Springsteen at the same time. I've had people say can you make it a little more green. Huh? It's tricky." He added, "Sometimes they think they want Sheryl Crow, because she has a hit single. But what they really want is magic, and that is whatever you, as an individual, can bring. It's a tough call between being a blank slate and being yourself."

Holley also served for several years as an associate music director and vocal coach for American Idol. As part of his job, he helps contestants rehearse and arrange the songs they are to perform. He said that his primary task was to encourage and support the participants as they faced scrutiny and criticism. He noted that it is common for some of the contestants to "crumble" upon leaving the stage if they have received critical comments from judge Simon Cowell. On American Idol he worked with artists who won including Jordin Sparks and Kris Allen.

=== Debut album ===
Independent Film, a self-released solo album by Holley, was released in 2008. Joan Anderman of The Boston Globe said the album is a "soul-satisfying project that won't pay the bills". In October 2008 it was reported that Holley had been conducting workshops on the art of audition. He drew inspiration from working on American Idol, as well as his experiences with artists including Stevie Wonder, Christina Aguilera, Kanye West, and Queen Latifah. While at Berklee College of Music in Boston, Holley gave advice to young singers who wanted to become famous, saying "Everyone starts out dreaming, and then you get married, have a baby, buy a house and a car, and what I want to let people know is that there are so many jobs out there. My thinking is, if you're a musician and you can make music instead of digging a ditch, make it."

Holley's last experiences with Jackson were in 2009, when he prepared for a scheduled 50-date concert series called This Is It. Holley rehearsed with Jackson as a backing singer at the Staples Center in Los Angeles and was also hired as the vocal director for the ill-fated shows. He was present on the singer's last night of rehearsals in June 2009. Hours later, Jackson died after suffering cardiac arrest at his nearby home. Holley sang during the group rendition of "We Are the World" at Jackson's memorial service in July 2009. He was joined by fellow This Is It backing vocalists Phinnessee, Judith Hill, and Orianthi.

In 2017 and again in 2024, Holley appeared as a featured guest at Kingvention, the annual Michael Jackson fan convention held in London and Los Angeles, respectively.

== Personal life ==
Holley is married to Shawn Holley, an attorney who practices both civil and criminal law in California. They have two daughters: Sasha Imogen and Olivia Rose. He also has a daughter from a previous marriage named Nayanna. Nayanna Holley is a singer, actress, and songwriter. She has traveled with her father, performing since she was three. The Los Angeles Times reported in 2005 that the family lived in a 2,800-square-foot (260 m^{2}) home, which was built in 1920 and bought by Holley and his wife in 2003. The Standard said in 2007 that the couple had purchased a 3,500-square-foot (330 m^{2}) Italian Renaissance Revival home in Lafayette Square, Los Angeles. Writers for the publication said that the Holleys would keep their nearby Wellington Square home and rent it out.

== Discography ==
- Independent Film (2008)

== Filmography ==
Film
Year	Title	Role	Notes
1992	Live in Bucharest: The Dangerous Tour	Himself	Jackson's backing singer
2012	Live at Wembley July 16, 1988	Himself	Jackson's backing singer
2009	Michael Jackson's This Is It	Himself	Jackson's backing singer and vocal director
