= Bruce Swedien =

American audio engineer (1934–2020)

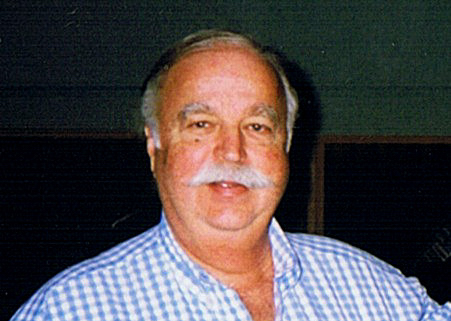
- Swedien in 1998
- Born: Bruce Frederick Swedien; April 19, 1934; Minneapolis, Minnesota, U.S.
- Died: November 16, 2020 (aged 86); Gainesville, Florida, U.S.
- Education: University of Minnesota
- Occupations: Audio engineer; songwriter; record producer
- Years active: 1954–2020
- Spouse: Beatrice Anderson (m. 1954)
- Children: 3
- Musical career
- Genres: Pop

Bruce Frederick Swedien (/swəˈdiːn/ swə-DEEN) (April 19, 1934 – November 16, 2020) was an American recording engineer, mixing engineer and record producer. Artists he worked with included Michael Jackson, Quincy Jones, Paul McCartney and Barbra Streisand.

Swedien first achieved widespread recognition as engineer with Frankie Valli and the Four Seasons' 1962 single "Big Girls Don't Cry" which sold over one million copies and stayed at number one on the Billboard Hot 100 for five weeks.

Swedien won five Grammy Awards for Best Engineered Album for his work with Jackson and Jones. He received thirteen additional nominations.

== Early life and education ==
Bruce Frederick Swedien was born on April 19, 1934, in Minneapolis, Minnesota. His parents, Ellsworth Swedien and Louise Swedien (née Perusse), were both classically trained musicians; Ellsworth was of Swedish descent, while Louise was of French descent. Their musical background contributed to Swedien's early interest in music and recording. His father bought him a disc recording machine when he was 10 and a professional tape recorder after graduating high school. Swedien studied electrical engineering with a minor in music at the University of Minnesota.

== Career ==
In 1954, aged 20, Swedien set up a recording studio in the old Garrick/LaSalle movie theater in Minneapolis. He transformed the space into the Swedien Recording Studio, where he produced and recorded music for several years with artists such as Art Blakey and Herbie Mann. However, in late 1957, he sold the studio and relocated to Chicago.

In 1957, after leaving Minneapolis he began working for RCA Victor Records in Chicago. Shortly after that, he left for Universal Recording Corporation where he worked under chief engineer Bill Putnam. He first met Quincy Jones in 1959 when Jones was vice president for Mercury Records in Chicago. The two worked on albums for artists like Dinah Washington and Sarah Vaughan. Swedien moved to Brunswick Records where he ran and developed the label's studios and sound in the late 1960s and 1970s. The label was responsible for numerous R&B and pop hits during that time, with artists such as The Chi-Lites, Tyrone Davis and Jackie Wilson.

Swedien was known for pioneering the "Acusonic Recording Process", pairing up microphones together on vocals and instruments, a technique enabled by synchronizing several multi-track recorders with SMPTE timecode. This achieved an enhanced roomy ambient sound, some of which is evident on albums produced in collaboration with Jones on such tracks as George Benson's "Give Me the Night", and the Michael Jackson albums on which he had worked. He would often experiment while recording with Jackson, having the singer stand at different distances from the microphone and singing through a cardboard tube, among other techniques. Swedien wrote about his experience working with Jackson in a 2009 book titled In the Studio with Michael Jackson.

His pop work included recordings by Patti Austin, Natalie Cole, Roberta Flack, Mick Jagger, David Hasselhoff, Jennifer Lopez, Paul McCartney, Diana Ross, Rufus, Chaka Khan, Barbra Streisand, Lena Horne, Donna Summer, and Sarah Vaughan. He worked on the scores for Night Shift, The Color Purple and Running Scared.

=== Recognition ===
On November 10, 2001, he was awarded an honorary doctorate in philosophy from the Luleå University of Technology for his achievements as a sound engineer. Swedien also held classes at the Swedish National Radio for practicing sound engineers.

On August 30, 2015, Swedien was presented the Pensado Giant Award at the second annual Pensado Awards held at Sony Pictures Studios in Culver City, California. The award was presented by Quincy Jones.

== Death ==
Swedien died on November 16, 2020, at the age of 86, from surgery complications for a broken hip caused by a fall. He was also diagnosed with COVID-19 but was asymptomatic.

== Awards ==
Swedien won 5 Grammy Awards and was nominated 12 times.

Year	Title	Artist	Category	Role	Result
1970	Moog Groove	The Electronic Concept Orchestra	Best Engineered Recording – Non-Classical	Engineer	Nominated
1979	Sounds...and Stuff Like That!!	Quincy Jones	Best Engineered Recording – Non-Classical	Engineer	Nominated
1981	"Give Me the Night"	George Benson	Best Engineered Recording – Non-Classical	Engineer	Nominated
1982	The Dude	Quincy Jones	Best Engineered Recording – Non-Classical	Engineer	Nominated
1984	Thriller	Michael Jackson	Best Engineered Recording – Non-Classical	Engineer	Won
1988	Bad	Michael Jackson	Best Engineered Recording – Non-Classical	Engineer	Won
1991	Back on the Block	Quincy Jones	Best Engineered Recording – Non-Classical	Engineer	Won
1993	Dangerous	Michael Jackson	Best Engineered Recording – Non-Classical	Producer, engineer	Won
1993	"Jam"	Michael Jackson	Best Rhythm & Blues Song	Composer	Nominated
1996	HIStory: Past, Present and Future, Book I	Michael Jackson	Album of the Year	Producer, engineer	Nominated
1996	HIStory: Past, Present and Future, Book I	Michael Jackson	Best Engineered Recording – Non-Classical	Producer, engineer	Nominated
1997	Q's Jook Joint	Quincy Jones	Best Engineered Recording – Non-Classical	Engineer	Won
