= Personal relationships of Michael Jackson =

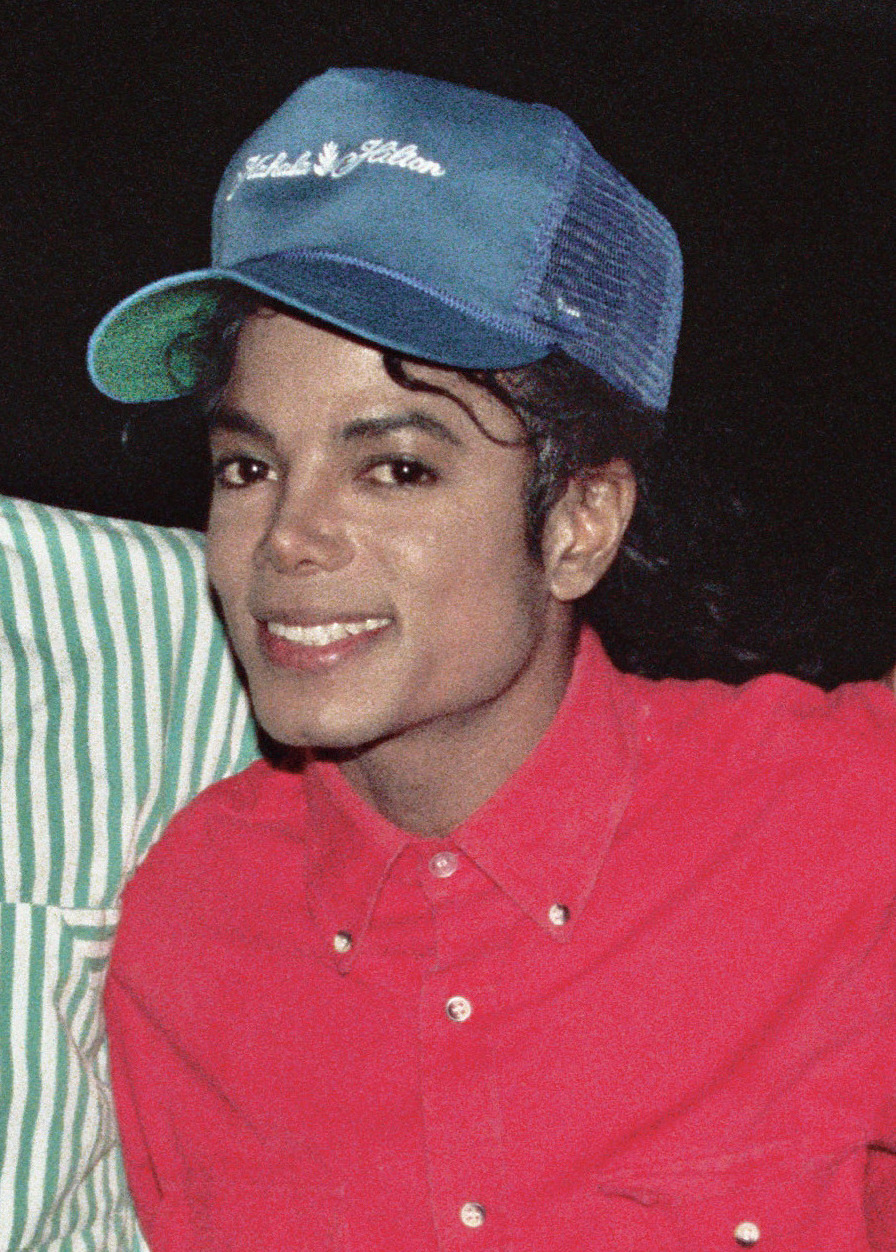
Michael Jackson in 1988

The personal relationships of Michael Jackson have been the subject of public and media attention for several decades. He was introduced to the topic of sexual activity at the age of nine while a member of the Jackson 5. He and his brothers would perform at strip clubs where they shared the bill with female strippers, and the sexual adventures of his brothers with groupies further affected Jackson's early life. It was reported that his first girlfriend was actress Tatum O'Neal, when he was a teenager in the 1970s. However, she later stated that their relationship was strictly platonic. In recent years, singer and actress Stephanie Mills revealed herself to have been Jackson's first girlfriend, their relationship starting when they first met during the production of The Wiz. Jackson was then rumored to have entered a platonic relationship with actress and model Brooke Shields in 1984. Shields later stated that they both held an equal admiration for each other, but that he started to become more asexual and distant towards her.

Having first been introduced to Lisa Marie Presley by her father's backup singer, Myrna Smith, in 1974, Jackson reconnected with Lisa Marie in November 1992. Shortly after becoming involved with her, in 1993. Presley supported Jackson as he became dependent on pain medication and eventually helped convince him to enter drug rehabilitation. In a telephone call, he proposed marriage to Presley. She agreed, and the two wed on May 26, 1994, at a private ceremony in the Dominican Republic. Married life for the couple was difficult, and the union ended in divorce in August 1996. Presley and Jackson continued to date, on and off, for four more years after their divorce.

Throughout his marriage with Presley, Jackson maintained a friendship with Debbie Rowe. She was the assistant of his dermatologist, who had been treating his appearance-changing condition of vitiligo, and befriended Jackson around 1981, continuing while he was separated from but still married to Presley. Jackson tried to conceive his first child with Rowe, who suffered a miscarriage in March 1996. Following the ordeal and the finalization of his first divorce, Jackson wed the pregnant Rowe on November 15, 1996, in Sydney, Australia. During the marriage, two of Jackson's three children were born: son Michael Joseph "Prince" Jackson, Jr. (born February 13, 1997) and daughter Paris-Michael Katherine Jackson (born April 3, 1998). Jackson and Rowe divorced in April 2000, with Rowe giving full custody rights of the children to Jackson. His third and final child, son Prince Michael Jackson II, was born to an unnamed surrogate mother on February 21, 2002.

In July 2009, it was revealed Jackson's will named Diana Ross as the next-in-line guardian for his children, after his mother, Katherine. In September 2009, Rabbi and author Shmuley Boteach released a book titled The Michael Jackson tapes, based on taped conversations he had with Jackson in 2001. It included Jackson's thoughts on personal relationships in general and specific ones. His romantic feelings for two famous friends were widely cited in the media; when asked if he got jealous when his long-time friend Elizabeth Taylor dated other men, he replied, "Yes and no. I know that if we ever did anything romantically, the press would be so mean and nasty and call us the Odd Couple. It would turn into a circus and that's the pain of it all." It is speculated that Jackson might have dated nine women throughout his career, apart from Lisa Marie Presley and Debbie Rowe, including former model Tatiana Thumbtzen and Taylor, per various media outlets. In 1993, Jackson was accused of sexually abusing the child of a family friend. The lawsuit was settled out of civil court; Jackson was not indicted. In 2005, he was tried and acquitted of further child sexual abuse allegations and several other charges.

== Early sexual and emotional experiences ==
=== Strip clubs ===
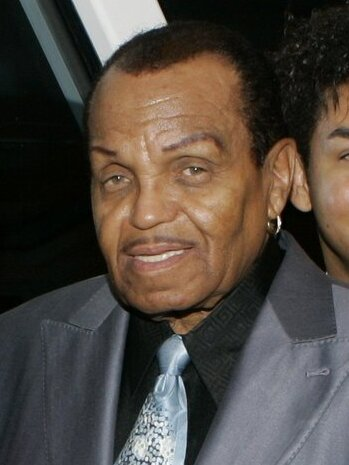
Joe Jackson had his sons play in strip clubs, despite the boys' religion.

From a young age, Jackson was exposed to sex. He received mixed messages on the subject from his parents. His mother Katherine is a devout Jehovah's Witness and conveyed her thoughts clearly; lust in thought or deed was sinful outside of marriage, and physical intimacy should be saved for marriage. In contrast to his wife, father Joe, a steel mill worker, shunned the religion and would have the Jackson 5 perform at strip clubs and seedy bars in the earliest days of their career. He allowed the then 9-year-old Michael to watch from the wings of the stage as male audience members whistled at women who stripped until nude.

While playing at Chicago's Peppermint Lounge, the brothers made use of a peephole in their dressing room, through which they had a clear view of the women's bathroom. They would take turns watching the women and, as Marlon recalled, "learned everything there was to know about ladies". During other residencies, the siblings would perform the Joe Tex song "Skinny Legs and All". Joseph would instruct a young Michael to make his way into the audience, crawl under tables, lift up ladies' skirts and peek at their panties as part of the performance. Though embarrassed by the task, Jackson feigned enjoyment as he knew the audience loved the routine.

Following such performances, the Jackson brothers would be tucked in bed by their oblivious mother and reminded of the virtues of being a good Jehovah's Witness. Katherine remained unaware of her sons' strip club activities for many years. Journalist J. Randy Taraborrelli reflected on Jackson's early life and noted that, at such a young age, he may not have been psychologically equipped to fully understand any sexual stimulation he may have received from such voyeuristic events. The writer further commented that Jackson's views on sex must have been conflicted between those of his strict mother and his libertine father.

=== Groupies and prostitutes ===
As members of the increasingly successful Jackson 5, Michael's brothers Jermaine and Jackie found fame advantageous. As they toured the country, they had sex with many female fans. Their guide was their father Joseph, who would often organize and arrange sexual encounters for his sons as well as cheat on his wife, Katherine, with their sons' groupies. The two brothers would bring girls back to a hotel room, where younger siblings Michael and Marlon were instructed to "play sleep". One girl, who had sexual relations with Jermaine, recalled such an experience:

"I jumped into bed with him and he climbed on top of me. As he climaxed, he shuddered so loudly I was afraid he would wake up Michael and Marlon, who were sleeping three feet away in the next bed. Or at least I thought they were sleeping. As I was slipping out of the room, I heard Michael say to Jermaine, 'Nice job. Now, can we please get some sleep?'"

While Marlon would correspond with and eventually marry his wife, Carol, at 18, Michael never had sex with groupies, finding his brothers' sometimes-misogynistic behavior toward women disgusting. In addition to not touching groupies, Jackson reportedly never had an interest in having any type of sex as a youngster. In one alleged incident, when he was 15, a male family member arranged for two prostitutes to take his virginity. They were told to "work him over", before being locked in a room with him. Instead, Michael picked up a Bible and read bible verses to the girls, who left in tears. James McField, who worked with the Jackson 5, stated that the lead singer of the band often needed someone to talk with. It was at these times that women would be introduced to him for companionship. McField asserted that he never witnessed anything sexual, and that such females were not Jackson's type; "He liked nice girls, pure girls who appeared to have no street background."

Jackson occasionally admonished and advised the groupies and prostitutes sent to pleasure his siblings. One Jackson fan recalled being selected from the audience to meet with Jackie. Backstage, she was handed a scrap of paper with an address to the location in which they were to meet. Michael approached her from behind and warned her that his brothers did not treat women right and that his brother only wanted to use her for sex. Changing the subject, the female fan asked for the pop star's autograph, which request he obliged in addition to writing, "Please, don't go". The woman ignored Michael's request and headed to the Jacksons' apartment complex, where she had sex with Jackie. Afterward, Jackie informed the woman that they would not meet again. Ashamed and upset, the fan left the apartment in tears.

On another occasion, a prostitute was brought to Jackson's room after a concert in Madison Square Garden. There, the pop star interrogated the prostitute, asking why she was a prostitute, whether she wanted to have sex with him, and how much it would cost. The woman responded that she was a prostitute for the money, but that she would have sex with him for free because she wanted him. The prostitute then proceeded to unbutton her blouse, exposing her breasts. Apparently repulsed, Jackson turned his head and begged her to "put them back". The singer suggested that they talk instead but he would still pay her, which she declined. Instead, she gave Jackson her telephone number, urging him to call her when he wanted to "get off". Jackson acknowledged the prostitute as she left, stating that he would call her one day, though he never did.

== First relationships ==
=== Tatum O'Neal ===
One of Jackson's first documented relationships was with the child actress Tatum O'Neal in the 1970s. Their friendship was established by the time O'Neal was 12 and Jackson was 17, and featured in gossip columns for several years after. Jackson in 1977 said "Well, I guess I am dating her in a way, I've taken her out a couple of times – or she's taken me out – whatever. I met her sometime back, when Paul McCartney gave a party on the Queen Mary boat. She was there and we talked a bit. Two years went by before I saw her again, which was at a club on Sunset Blvd called the Roxy. We talked and talked and talked. The next day she invited me to join her at Hugh Hefner's house to watch Roots on videotape. She got sort of bored, so we went outside and got into the jacuzzi. We weren't naked as people have said. We both had on bathing suits, just enjoying ourselves. And that's it." Although in 1982 he says that he and O'Neal had been engaged in a serious relationship, but because both were busy, it had "cooled off" to the point of their remaining just friends.

In the documentary Living with Michael Jackson (2003), Jackson alleged that near the beginning of their relationship, the 12-year-old actress tried to seduce the then 17-year-old singer. According to Jackson, the incident happened at her home, where she attempted to unbutton his shirt and talked explicitly about sex. O'Neal's behavior apparently proved too much for Jackson, who became scared and covered his face, before she walked away. When confronted with the allegation, O'Neal claimed to have been "just as shocked as everyone else". She stated that while having respect for Jackson as an artist and a person, he had "a very vivid imagination". The actress described his statements as "inaccurate"; "at 12-years-old, there was no way she was capable of being as mature or as sophisticated as he claimed". O'Neal released her autobiography A Paper Life in 2004, a year after the Jackson documentary. In the book, she claimed it was Jackson who attempted to make out with her. The actress wrote, "I was just 12 and not at all ready for a real-life encounter[...] Michael, who was sweating profusely, seemed as intimidated as I was. He jumped up nervously and said, 'Uh ... gotta go.'"

But this contradicted O'Neal's own account of the relationship, published in 1995 in Vibe magazine, where she remembered Jackson as "being so shy" and "one of the nicest, most innocent people I've ever met", and, "Once he came into my bedroom, and he wouldn't even sit on my bed." She described the relationship as "a really wonderful friendship" where they would dance and "talk on the phone all the time." She recalled that he found it funny that she could drive at 12 and he could not. And that one time they had a "jam session" at her house, where he played the drums, and her brother played guitar. She said the relationship ended when she was 12, after he asked her to go with him to the premiere of The Wiz, in which he acted, but her agent disapproved, she did what she was told because she was a child.

Jackson also spoke about O'Neal in 2001 with Rabbi Shmuley. He described holding hands with her: "I was, like, in heaven. It was the most magical thing. It was better than kissing her, it was better than anything." And similar to what he told Bashir, he said, "...she was 13. And I was naive. She wanted to do everything and I didn't want to have sex at all." He recalled one of the times they held hands:

"I remember we went to this club, and I don't go to clubs, which was called the Roxy. And I was watching the band, I was sitting there, and underneath the table, she was holding my hand, and I was, like melting. [Rabbi Shmuley: She held your hand and you felt love?] Fireworks going off. It was all I needed. But that means nothing to kids today. She grew up too fast. She wasn't into innocence, and I love that."

=== Brooke Shields ===
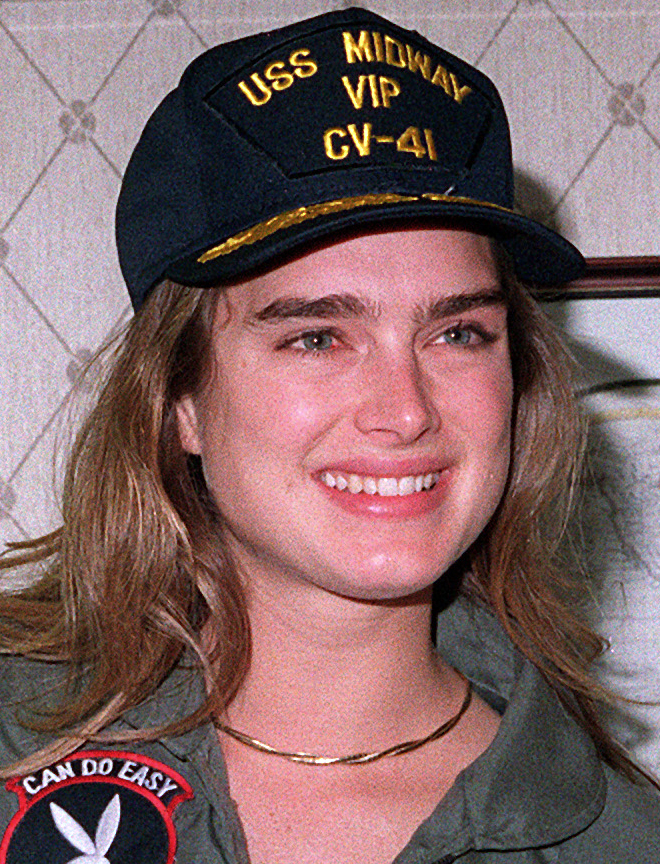
Shields in 1991

Jackson met 15-year-old actress-model-socialite Brooke Shields in 1981, at the Academy Awards. From there, the pair enjoyed a close relationship. Speaking in 2009, she reflected that they were close because sex was never an issue for them. Although the headlines in the media referred to Shields' talking about an "asexual Jackson" after his death, what she actually said was, "As he grew older and the more he started to change physically, the more asexual he became to me." She also said that as she grew up and started having boyfriends, she would confide in him about her intimate experiences, as he was curious. She said, "he was like a little kid who talked about the bases – what first base was, what second base was".

In 2001, Jackson told Rabbi Shmuley: Shields was "one of the loves of my life. I just wished she loved me as much as I loved her", and that they "dated a lot." Before meeting her, he said that he had pictures of her all over his room. He recalled his happiness when they first met in 1981. He was at the 53rd Academy Awards with Diana Ross, and Shields walked up and introduced herself; then at the after-party, she asked him to dance with her. They exchanged numbers, and he "was up all night, singing, spinning around my room, just so happy." He also said, "We had one encounter when she got real intimate and I chickened out. And I shouldn't have."

In his autobiography Moonwalk (1988), Jackson said his relationship with Shields was "romantically serious for a while." Shields said that while never formally proposing, he would speak about the two marrying and raising adoptive children together. The suggestions were met with disapproval from Shields, who felt such a move would have "divided [her] life too much". She recalled: "There were times when he would ask me to marry him, and I would say, 'You have me for the rest of your life, you don't need to marry me, I'm going to go on...have my own marriage and my own kids, and you'll always have me.' I think it made him relax. He didn't want to lose things that meant something to him."

As the couple's separate lives diverged, the two gradually saw each other less. At the time of Jackson's death in 2009, the pair had not seen each other for sixteen years. Shields claimed that in Jackson's last years "it was harder to get the right number to get through to him". In July 2009, she spoke at the Michael Jackson memorial service, reminiscing about their time together:

"Thinking back to when we met and the many times that we spent together and whenever we were out together, there would be a caption of some kind, and the caption usually said something like 'an odd couple' or 'an unlikely pair,' but to us, it was the most natural and easiest of friendships...Michael always knew he could count on me to support him or be his date, and that we would have fun no matter where we were. We had a bond...both of us needed to be adults very early, but when we were together, we were two little kids having fun."

=== Diana Ross ===
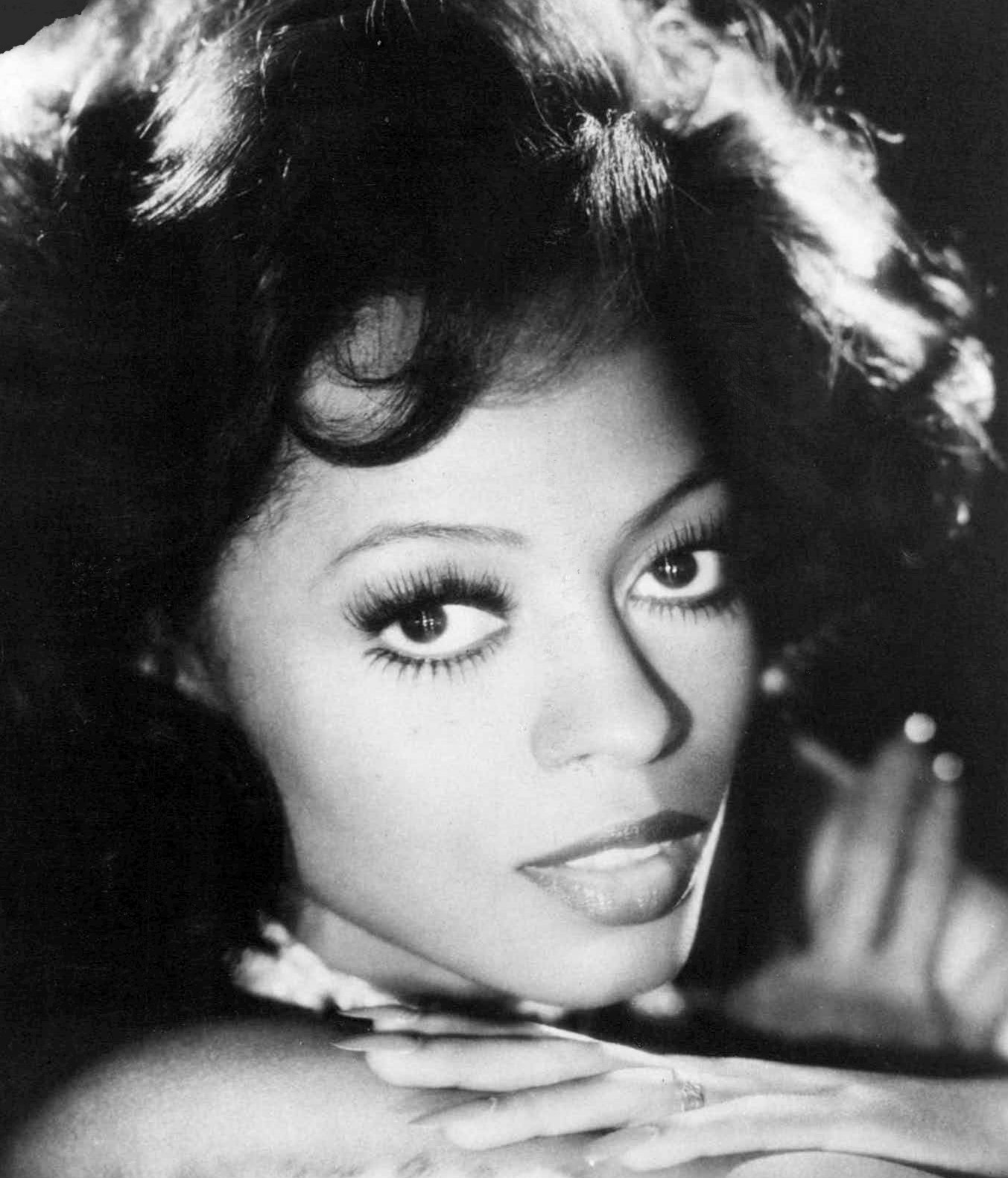
Ross in 1976

Jackson first met Diana Ross at the age of 9. He wrote in his autobiography that she was his "mother, sister and lover all combined in one". According to J. Randy Taraborrelli during the filming of The Wiz, Jackson invited Ross to stay at his apartment overnight. Ross's assistant had been trying to contact them as they were late for filming and was surprised to learn that Ross had been staying at Jackson's apartment. Diana was later overheard telling some friends "Well, I'll tell you one thing, Michael definitely isn't gay". When Ross married Arne Næss Jr. in the mid-1980s Jackson cancelled his attendance to the public wedding. He was jealous, because he "loved her and always will". They appeared together on a television special in 1981, where Ross and Jackson called each other "sexy". Jackson wrote in his will back in 2002, that Ross would take custody of his children if his mother, Katherine, died before him. It was rumored that "Dirty Diana", as well as a few other songs, were about Ross, however these rumors were later debunked, although Jackson's brother Jermaine has stated "Remember the Time" is about Ross.

== Lisa Marie Presley ==
=== First meeting and courtship ===
In 1974, a 16-year-old Jackson was introduced for the first time to Lisa Marie Presley at the Sahara Tahoe in Stateline, Nevada by singer Myrna Smith of The Sweet Inspirations, the backing group who sang with her father, Elvis Presley. Lisa Marie was 6 years old at the time and had been brought to the hotel to watch a show by the Jackson 5, of whom she was a big fan. The young girl was particularly fascinated by lead singer Michael Jackson and his dancing talent.

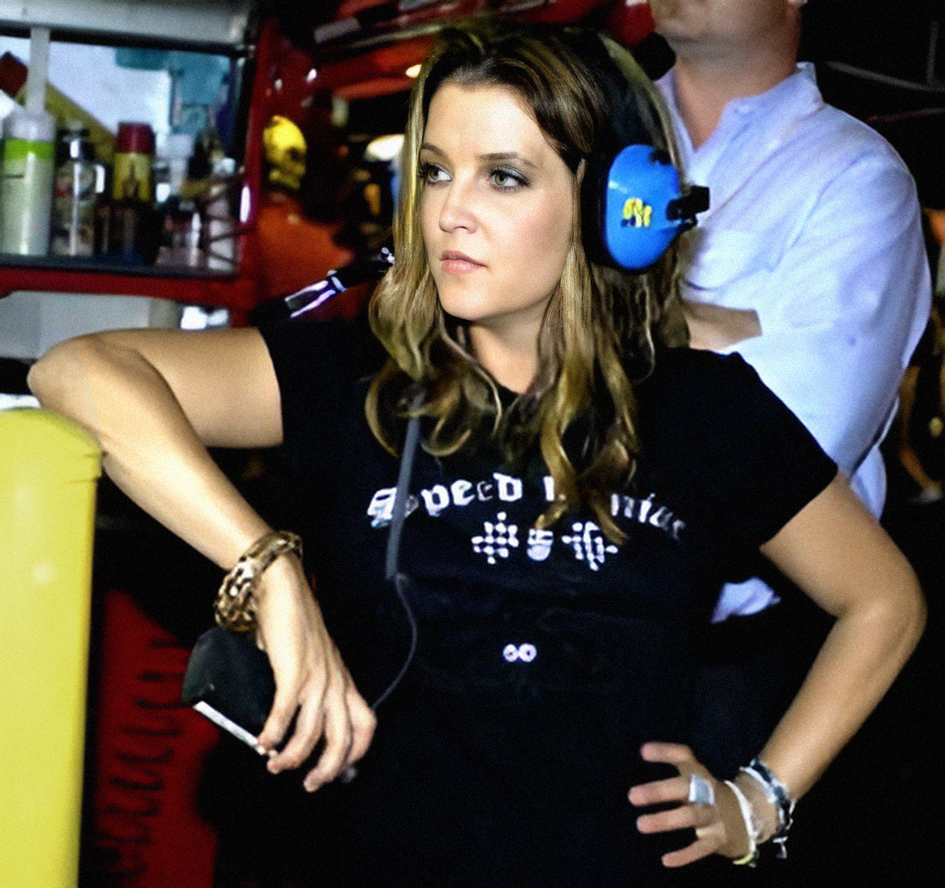
Lisa Marie Presley was introduced to Jackson by a member of her father Elvis Presley's backing group.

According to a friend of Presley, "their adult friendship began in November 1992 in L.A." They met at a private dinner held at the home of their mutual friend, the artist Brett-Livingstone Strong. Knowing that Presley had been looking for help within the music industry, Strong had her play tapes for Jackson, who was impressed with Presley's voice. The pair talked for the remainder of the night, until it was time for Jackson to leave. At this point, according to Strong, Jackson gave Presley, who was still married at the time, a penetrating look and said in a conspiratorial voice, "You and me, we could get into a lot of trouble. Think about that, girl."

In the days following this interaction, Presley and Jackson spoke on the telephone almost every day, forging a strong friendship. The two came to realize they had much in common: both had been protected and sheltered from the real world; both felt they had missed out on a normal childhood; both were mistrustful of outsiders, having spent most of their lives feeling exploited by them; and both had problems with the media. Presley was raised in Graceland, while Jackson lived at Neverland.

In 1993, he became the subject of child sexual abuse accusations and Presley, along with a few others, was there for emotional support. Jackson would call Presley from overseas as he embarked upon the second leg of the Dangerous World Tour and the child abuse investigation intensified. During such telephone conversations, Presley attempted to reverse Jackson's sadness with humor and advice. Presley later recalled that she believed in the musician's innocence and that she could "save him". Fueled by her past addictions and her father's death, Presley supported Jackson as he became addicted to painkillers, urging him to settle the allegations out of court and go into rehabilitation. He subsequently did both.

=== Proposal and wedding ===
During one of Jackson's calls to Presley that he proposed marriage, asking: "If I asked you to marry me, would you do it?" Though still married to the actor Danny Keough, whom she had wed in 1988 and had two children with, Presley replied that she would. After a pause, Jackson exclaimed that he had to use the bathroom. On his return, Jackson explained to his new fiancée that his love for her was genuine and she had to believe him. In 2010, Presley acknowledged to Oprah Winfrey that Jackson did formally propose one day in the library, taking out a 10 carat diamond ring and getting down on his knees.

Following several months engaged, Jackson and Presley wed on May 26, 1994, at a ceremony in the Dominican Republic. Presley had divorced Keough only twenty days before. The 15-minute ceremony was held by Judge Hugo Francisco Alvarez Perez at his home in the La Vega Province. The union was conducted in Spanish and translated for Presley and Jackson by an attorney. Eva Darling, Presley's friend, served as a witness along with Thomas Keough, her ex-husband's brother. At the time of their marriage, the press and public were unaware that the two even knew each other. The wedding was kept secret from them, Jackson's family, and Presley's mother Priscilla. However, Gotham Chopra recalled that Jackson called him "in a panic" on his wedding night and asked if he had any "sex advice", wanting "to make sure that Lisa was impressed with his 'moves.'"

Upon being informed of her daughter's marriage with Jackson a week later, Priscilla became irritated; she believed Jackson was using her child to rehabilitate his image following the child abuse accusations. To the press, however, Priscilla stated that she was "very supportive of Lisa Marie and everything she does". The union was met with a mixed reaction from the media when it was made public two months later. Some sources described the union of "The King of Pop" and "The Princess of Rock 'n' Roll" as being "The Marriage of the Century". One newspaper headline scoffed, "Jackson-Presley Union Sparks Shock, Doubt, Laughs." Addressing both the media and public, Presley issued a statement:

"My married name is Mrs. Lisa Marie Presley-Jackson. My marriage to Michael Jackson took place in a private ceremony outside the United States (11) weeks ago. It was not formally announced until now for several reasons; foremost being that we are both very private people living in the glare of the public media. We both wanted a private marriage ceremony without the distraction of a media circus. I am very much in love with Michael, I dedicate my life to being his wife. I understand and support him. We both look forward to raising a family and living happy, healthy lives together. We hope friends and fans will understand and respect our privacy."

=== Married life and disagreements ===
For the next year of their married life, the newly wedded couple divided their time between Jackson's 2,700-acre (11 km^{2}) Neverland Ranch in Santa Ynez, California and Presley's 1-acre (4,000 m^{2}) estate, 100 miles (160 km) away in Hidden Hills. Defying the initial thoughts of some of the public, Presley did not move into Jackson's home upon getting married. According to J. Randy Taraborrelli, this was due to her wanting to remain independent, as well as Presley's children (Danielle and Benjamin) finding their new stepfather "a little strange".

The pair first appeared together on television at the 1994 MTV Video Music Awards, in what has been described as a "memorable moment". Holding hands, the couple walked onto the stage in New York. In front of a television audience of 250 million, Jackson announced, "Just think, nobody thought this would last", before embracing Presley in a kiss. Afterward, Presley became angered at her husband, feeling he had used her. Jackson reasoned that the kiss, which was dubbed "The Kiss of the Century", would be talked about for decades, with people playing the clip over and over. Jackson's attempts at placating Presley proved futile; she told him not to "fucking even come near me" and remained angry for days.

In the same week, Jackson and Presley had another argument. Newspaper reports had been suggesting that if Elvis were alive, he would not approve of his daughter's marriage. Annoyed, Jackson suggested that the couple could find out by holding a séance to contact the deceased "King of Rock 'n' Roll". During the session they would ask his opinion of the union. Presley felt the idea was tasteless and, upon Jackson's continuing to push the idea, warned, "If you stay on this particular road, they're gonna need a medium to contact you in the Great Beyond, because I'm about to put you there, right now." The two never spoke of the incident again.

=== Primetime and further marriage difficulties ===
Jackson and Presley appeared on the television show Primetime in June 1995. In Jackson's first interview since 1993 and Presley's first ever, Diane Sawyer quizzed the pair on their private life with, according to Jet, a series of "insensitive" questions. Presley boasted that she and Jackson had regular sex, following Sawyer's questioning their sex life. When asked if the marriage was a sham, Presley asserted that such rumors were "crap"; she said she would never marry someone for any other reason than being in love with him, and concluded that if the public thought differently, they could "eat it". The following day, Presley reflected that the interview had been a disaster; she had hoped the couple would be perceived as being serious, yet Jackson fooled around during the show, at one point holding two fingers behind his wife's head to make bunny ears. Presley's friend Monica Pastelle revealed that it was at this point that Presley began to wonder whether she had made a mistake in choosing Jackson as a long-term partner.

A further problem for the pair was Jackson's insistence on being around children. Though she never believed he was a pedophile—"I wouldn't have let him near my kids if I thought that"—she felt her husband was only opening himself up to more rumor and innuendo following the 1993 allegations. One evening at Neverland, Presley confronted the pop star on the issue and was met with a defiant Jackson, resulting in another argument. Upon being called selfish, Jackson pointed to his humanitarian endeavors. Presley countered that the issue was about them.

Presley also disagreed with having children with Jackson. Imagining the future and what would happen if the marriage ended, Presley saw a "custody battle nightmare". In addition, she felt her husband was too emotionally immature to be a parent, having watched his daily interactions with other people; she believed he was the one in need of parenting. Jackson explained to his wife over breakfast one morning that she did not have to be the biological mother if she so desired. He explained, "My friend Debbie [Rowe] said she will get pregnant and have my baby. If you won't do it, then she will. How about that?" Unmoved, Presley replied that it was fine by her.

Following several more troubled months, Jackson ended up in the hospital; he had collapsed while rehearsing for a concert in New York. Presley arrived to meet her ill husband and yet another heated debate ensued. The argument ended after Jackson warned her that she was making his heart rate go up and asked her to leave. She obliged, and was admonished by a doctor and Jackson's mother, Katherine, along the way. Presley subsequently returned to Los Angeles. Upon being discharged from the hospital, Jackson went to Disneyland Paris to recover.

=== Divorce ===
Presley filed for divorce in early 1996, citing "irreconcilable differences" and noting their date of separation as December 10, 1995, shortly after the incident in the hospital. The divorce was finalized on August 20, 1996. As part of the settlement, Presley received 10% of the royalties from HIStory: Past, Present and Future, Book I, the album that contained the song "You Are Not Alone", whose music video featured a semi-nude Presley and Jackson frolicking against an ethereal backdrop. As she did not sign a confidentiality agreement, a further clause stated that Presley could write a tell-all book about her time with Jackson. At the time, she revealed that she had no wish to write a memoir; she still had respect for Jackson and did not want to speak critically of him. Presley also wanted to preserve her own dignity and keep their life together private.

It's easy to be skeptical of Michael's relationship with her, but doing so risks ignoring his obvious humanity. Despite the plastic surgeries and maddening friendships with boys, and all the rest of the eccentric behavior that goes into making Michael Jackson such a strange individual, he is still a human being with emotions, feelings and a beating heart – and, somehow, Lisa Marie Presley was the one to truly touch it, to truly affect him.

— J. Randy Taraborrelli, The Magic and the Madness (2004)

The divorce proved difficult for Jackson, who spent several weeks lamenting his loss. Presley was the first person with whom he had connected on such a high level. She had supported him as he faced allegations and became dependent on pain medication. It was also the first time that Jackson had had sexual chemistry with another person. Presley was able to make him open up and express himself through their physically intimate moments together. At the time, Jackson was afraid there would never be another woman who made him feel the way his ex-wife had. He eventually realized he had to move on; he had a world tour to prepare for and new music to work on. Jackson also knew that Presley would never make him a father, which he longed to be.

=== Aftermath ===
Presley was seen with Jackson in various cities during the HIStory World Tour in 1997; notably at various functions in South Africa and in London, holding hands backstage and around the city. In February 1998, they were photographed in an intimate moment together outside a Beverly Hills restaurant on Presley's birthday. In a 2010 interview on Oprah, Presley said that they spent four years after the divorce getting back together and breaking up, until she felt she "had to push him away".

She described the parallels between the lives of Jackson and her father Elvis, and said Jackson constantly asked her about the details of Elvis' death because he felt that he was "going to end up the same way". She had described such a conversation in a blog post the day after Jackson died, wherein she shared her feelings about his death. According to Presley, the last "coherently good conversation" she had with Jackson was in 2005. She said Jackson told her she had been right about certain people around him, whom she called "vampires". She replied that she was indifferent when he asked if she still loved him. But Presley also said his death made her realize he loved her. She acknowledged his efforts in the relationship, saying, "He honestly tried so hard and went through so much with me", but "I didn't appreciate it then, and I wish I did." At the end of the conversation, he reportedly told her "he felt that someone was going to try to kill him to get a hold of his catalog and his estate" and named some names she did not want to say in the interview.

== Debbie Rowe ==
=== Background and friendship ===
Debbie Rowe met Jackson in the mid-1980s, while working as an assistant for his dermatologist Dr. Arnold Klein. Rowe treated Jackson's vitiligo, which he had been diagnosed with in 1986 and which would affect his physical appearance for the remainder of his life. Rowe supported Jackson, providing answers to the questions he asked about his medical condition. The pair became good friends; the pop star frequently sent autographed merchandise to the woman, who hung it on the walls of her office. According to her friend Tanya Boyd, Rowe would obsess over Jackson. She would say to her friend, "If people knew him like I knew him, they would not think he was strange. He's unique, kinky, actually."

The Jackson–Rowe friendship would last for several years, during which time Rowe married and divorced Richard Edelman, a man she claimed to have felt trapped by. Rowe and Jackson would both talk to each other about their unhappy marriages; his with Presley and hers with Edelman, a teacher at Hollywood High School. Like Jackson's first wife, Rowe supported Jackson when he was accused of child sexual abuse. Jackson kept his friendship with Rowe a secret from his wife, who eventually found out but thought nothing of it; she felt Rowe was not her husband's type because she was not glamorous enough.

=== First pregnancy and miscarriage ===
As Presley had refused to carry Jackson's children, Rowe offered to give birth to a child for Jackson. Shortly after Presley and Jackson's separation, Rowe became pregnant but suffered a miscarriage in March 1996. The event devastated Rowe, who feared that she would never be able to have a baby. Jackson comforted and consoled Rowe throughout the ordeal, which remained hidden from the media and public.

=== Second pregnancy and reaction ===
Jackson embarked on the first leg of his HIStory World Tour in September 1996. One month into the tour, and several months after his divorce from Presley, it was revealed that Rowe was pregnant with his child. One tabloid newspaper, the News of the World, told the story under the headline "I'm Having Michael's Baby". Rowe felt that the News of the World article was purposely salacious and called the editorial staff "bastards". Biographer J. Randy Taraborrelli later noted that the article, which had been put together from a secret recording between Rowe and a friend, had been fairly accurate. It detailed that Jackson was the father of the baby and that he would be raising the child alone. It also stated that Jackson impregnated Rowe artificially with his own sperm cells. Further reports alleged that the relationship was an "economic" one.

In a statement, Jackson condemned the accusations of being in an economic relationship and using artificial insemination as "completely false and irresponsible". Despite the denials, it was noted that Rowe had received millions of dollars from Jackson as "gifts" over the years. Among court papers filed against Jackson in 2002 by business manager Myung Ho Lee, a monthly budget for Jackson was detailed and included a $1.5 million payment to Rowe, along with a $1.3 million home in 1997; he and Rowe never lived together.

Michael's mother, Katherine, urged her son to wed the mother of his unborn child. Katherine did not want her son to be like his father, who had a child with another woman while married to Michael's mother. Katherine spoke on the telephone with Rowe about the sanctity of marriage and about the Jehovah's Witness faith. She later spoke to Jackson, telling him to marry "that nice girl, Debbie" and "give your child a name, not like your poor, half-sister, Joh'Vonnie." Before Katherine's involvement, Jackson intended to keep the identity of Rowe a secret in an arrangement common with surrogacy contracts. After speaking with his mother, Jackson asked Rowe to meet him in Australia and they wed the day after her arrival.

=== Wedding ===
Jackson and Rowe wed on 14 November 1996, in a midnight ceremony at the Sheraton on the Park Hotel in Sydney, Australia. The night before the wedding, Jackson had called Presley, who gave him and Rowe her blessing. In front of fifteen friends, the pair exchanged vows at the hotel. Jackson's 8-year-old nephew, Anthony, served as the best man during the ceremony.

Media and public reaction to the marriage was largely negative. Some commentators believed Jackson was marrying a person he did not love, and it was speculated that Rowe was having a baby who may not have been biologically Jackson's. The Daily Mirror, a British tabloid newspaper, published a photograph of Rowe holding her head in her hands on the balcony of an Australian hotel with the caption "Oh, God! I've Just Married Michael Jackson." However, one Jackson biographer stated that Rowe's dismay in the photo was most probably due to the presence of paparazzi.

=== Birth of first child ===
Jackson and Rowe's first child together, Michael Joseph Jackson Jr. (also known as "Prince"), was born on February 13, 1997, at Cedars-Sinai Medical Center in Los Angeles. The baby was nicknamed after Michael's grandfather and great-grandfather, who were both called "Prince" Albert his mother side. He was subsequently taken by his father to Neverland Ranch. Rowe recuperated at a friend's house upon her release from the hospital.

Six weeks after the birth, Rowe saw her son for the first time since his birth. She had met with Jackson to pose for photographs with their newborn son at a hotel. Upon arriving, Rowe was ushered into the hotel room, where she was given the infant to hold and told to smile for the camera with Michael, then sent away. Rowe did not want to become attached to Prince, as she felt it would make her situation harder to deal with. At Neverland, Prince was cared for by a team of six nannies and six nurses during his first few months. According to one nanny who worked at the Ranch, Prince's mother was not a significant presence in the child's early life. "I saw her maybe three times and she seemed very sullen."

=== Third pregnancy and birth of second child ===
Rowe announced that she was pregnant with Jackson's second child in November 1997. The baby was to be a girl. Paris-Michael Katherine Jackson was born on April 3, 1998, named after the French city in which her parents said she was conceived; her middle names come from her father and paternal grandmother. Jackson later claimed that he was so anxious following the birth of his daughter, that he "snatched" her and ran straight home "with all the placenta and everything all over her". Rowe later confirmed that Jackson had the placenta frozen. Following the birth, Jackson's associates contacted Pope John Paul II at the Vatican in Rome, in the hope that the pontiff would personally baptize the pop star's daughter. An official for the Pope informed Jackson by letter that he would not participate in what may be perceived as a publicity stunt.

=== Divorce ===
Feeling uncomfortable with their arrangement, Rowe asked Jackson for a divorce, which was granted in April 2000. Rowe received around $10 million in a settlement, which started with an immediate payment of $1.5 million. With the divorce, Rowe gave Jackson full custody rights to Michael Jr. and Paris. They concluded that despite coming to the end of married life, they would continue to remain friends. In The Michael Jackson Interview: The Footage You Were Never Meant to See, Rowe attempted to explain her relationship with Jackson and their two children:

My kids don't call me Mom because I don't want them to. They're Michael's children. It's not that they are not my children, but I had them because I wanted him to be a father. People make remarks, "I can't believe she left her children." Left them? I left my children? I did not leave my children. My children are with their father, where they are supposed to be. I didn't do it to be a mother... If he called me tonight and said let's have five more [children], I'd do it in a heartbeat.

=== Birth of third child ===
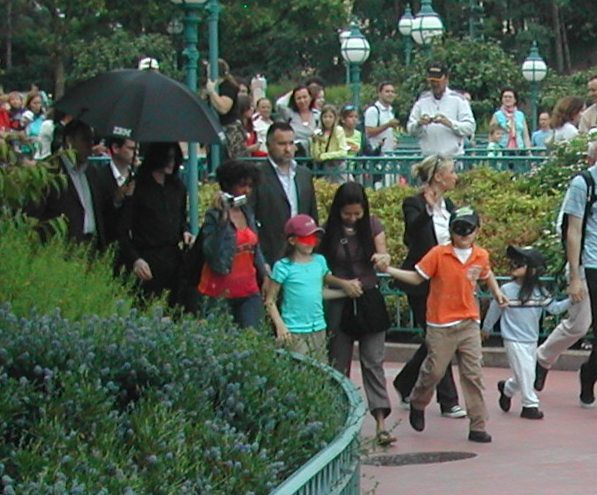
Jackson with his three children in 2006; the eldest two were born by Rowe.

Following the divorce, Jackson's third child, Prince Michael Jackson II, was born on February 21, 2002, to an unnamed surrogate mother. Rowe said that she was not the biological mother of Prince Michael. The child was nicknamed "Blanket". Jackson stated that the baby was produced through artificial insemination using his own sperm cells. He further said that he did not know the mother.

In 2004, Rowe legally applied for her access to her two children to be reinstated, and subsequently reached an agreement with Jackson two years later. Following Jackson's death in 2009, his mother, Katherine, was made the permanent guardian of Prince, Paris, and their half-brother, Prince Michael. In addition, a new custody arrangement was made with Rowe, who had visitation rights with her two children and continued to receive spousal support payments. Whether Jackson was the biological father of his three children became a matter of discussion after it was reported that they had "pale skin". Jackson stated in 2003 that the children were biologically his.

== Allegations of homosexuality ==
Despite his relationships with women, Jackson's sexuality was the subject of speculation and controversy for decades. He had faced allegations of being gay since he was a teenager, as well as later being labelled asexual. One 1970s newspaper story alleged that the then 19-year-old singer was to have a sex change operation and marry the songwriter Clifton Davis. Jackson found out about the story from a crying fan. The musician reassured the girl that the tale was untrue and condemned it as a "stupid rumor". The story circulated for many months, during which time Jackson became upset; he was raised in a family where homosexuality was considered sinful. Jackson would continue to deny being gay throughout his life. In a 1979 interview, the pop star stated that he was not gay and that he would not "have a nervous breakdown because people think I like having sex with men". He added that if he let the rumor affect him, it would make him cheap and make it sound as if he was prejudiced against gay people. He expressed that many of his fans may be gay, and that he did not mind that, opining "That's their lives and this is mine."

== Sexual abuse allegations ==
=== 1993 sexual abuse allegations ===
In 1993, Jackson was accused of child sexual abuse by Evan Chandler, on behalf of his then-13-year-old child, Jordan. To the father's disapproval, his son had become friends with the musician in May 1992. Allegedly under the influence of a controversial sedative administered by Evan, a dentist, Jordan said that Jackson had touched his penis. Evan was tape-recorded threatening to damage Jackson's music career and engaged him in unsuccessful negotiations to resolve the issue with a financial settlement. Jordan then told a psychiatrist and later police that he and Jackson had engaged in acts of kissing, masturbation, and oral sex.

Jackson settled a civil suit out of court with the Chandler family and their legal team in January 1994. After Jordan refused to testify in the criminal proceedings, the State closed its criminal investigation and Jackson was not charged with a crime. A few months after Jackson's death in 2009, Evan died by suicide.

=== 2003 sexual abuse allegations ===
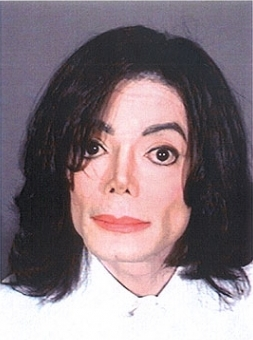
Jackson's 2003 mugshot

Further accusations of child sexual abuse were made in 2003, by 13-year-old Gavin Arvizo. The allegations came after Jackson and the boy appeared in the documentary Living with Michael Jackson, in which Jackson stated that he shared his bed with children in a non-sexual fashion. Jackson was indicted on four counts of molesting a minor, four counts of intoxicating a minor, one count of abduction, and one count of conspiring to hold the boy and his family captive at Neverland Ranch. He denied all the charges, and family members proclaimed that he was the victim of an extortion attempt. On June 13, 2005, the jury found Jackson not guilty on all charges.

=== 2013 and 2014 posthumous sexual abuse allegations ===
In May 2013, choreographer Wade Robson filed a civil lawsuit against Jackson's estate for child sexual abuse. The date for the hearing which would determine whether or not Robson could sue Jackson's estate, was scheduled for June 2, 2014. Robson met Jackson when he was 5 years old. In 2005, he had testified in Jackson's defense during his child molestation trial. At that trial, Jackson's former housekeeper Blanca Francia had testified that she had witnessed Robson showering with Jackson when the boy was 8 or 9.

In his 2013 filing, Robson claimed that by the time he was 7 years old, he was regularly having sleepovers at Jackson's Neverland Ranch and at Jackson's homes in Los Angeles and Las Vegas, which lasted until he was 14, and that Jackson sexually abused him throughout the seven-year period. The attorney for Jackson's estate described Robson's claim as "outrageous and pathetic". In December 2017, the lawsuit against Jackson's corporations were dropped, with Judge Mitchell L. Beckloff stating that the corporations were not liable to any alleged damages against Robson. Two years prior, Beckloff dismissed an earlier lawsuit against Jackson's estate, stating that Robson waited too long to file.

On January 25, 2019, the four-hour documentary Leaving Neverland, directed by Dan Reed, was screened at the Sundance Film Festival. It contains interviews of Robson and James Safechuck. The film was shown on HBO in the US and Channel 4 in the UK in March. The estate dismissed the new allegations. In 2019, an appeals court revived Robson's and Safechuck's lawsuits against Jackson's corporations following a change in California law expanding the statute of limitations for child sexual abuse lawsuits. On October 20, 2020, Safechuck's lawsuit against Jackson's corporations was dismissed. The presiding judge ruled that there was no evidence that he had a relationship with Jackson's companies or that they had any legal responsibility of care for him.

=== 2024 posthumous sexual abuse allegations ===
In September 2024, Michael Jackson's estate alleged that a former associate linked to the Cascio family attempted to obtain $213 million by threatening to revive sexual abuse allegations, describing the demand as civil extortion following a confidential 2020 settlement. In 2026, four members of the Cascio family—Edward, Dominic, Marie Nicole, and Aldo—filed a federal civil lawsuit against the estate alleging sexual abuse during their childhood in the 1990s and early 2000s. The Cascios had previously publicly defended Jackson for many years; Frank Cascio authored the 2011 memoir My Friend Michael describing his relationship with Jackson, and Edward Cascio produced the disputed songs "Breaking News", "Monster" and "Keep Your Head Up" on the 2010 album Michael, which were removed from streaming services in 2022 following disputes over their authenticity.
