= Prince Michael Jackson =

Prince Michael Jackson may refer to:

- Bigi Jackson (born 2002), born Prince Michael Jackson II, American filmmaker and younger son of Michael Jackson
- Prince Jackson (born 1997), born Michael Joseph Jackson Jr., American actor and elder son of Michael Jackson
