= Bigi Jackson =

Youngest son of Michael Jackson

- Jackson in 2026
- Born: Prince Michael Jackson II; February 21, 2002 (age 24); La Mesa, California, U.S.
- Other name: Blanket Jackson
- Education: The Buckley School
- Occupation: Filmmaker
- Father: Michael Jackson
- Relatives: Prince Jackson (half-brother); Paris Jackson (half-sister); Jackson family

Prince Michael Jackson II (born February 21, 2002), widely known as Bigi Jackson and formerly known as Blanket Jackson, is an American filmmaker and media personality. He is the youngest child and second son of the singer Michael Jackson.

Jackson largely remained out of the public eye during his youth, occasionally appearing alongside his siblings following the death of his father in 2009. In 2024, he wrote the directed the short film Rochelles, which premiered at the Santa Monica Film Festival and won the award for Best Drama.

== Early life and education ==
Prince Michael Jackson II was born on February 21, 2002, in La Mesa, California, to the singer Michael Jackson via an undisclosed surrogate. He was raised alongside his older half-siblings, Prince and Paris, primarily at the Neverland Ranch. During his early childhood, he was frequently referred to by the media moniker "Blanket".

Following his father's death in 2009, the 7-year-old Bigi was placed under the legal guardianship of his grandmother, Katherine Jackson. He was later placed under the co-guardianship of Katherine and his cousin TJ Jackson. Initially homeschooled, Jackson later attended The Buckley School, a private college-preparatory school in Sherman Oaks, California. In 2015, he began publicly going by the name "Bigi".

== Filmography ==
=== Film ===
Filmmaking credits
Year	Title	Director	Writer	Producer	Notes	Ref.
2024	Rochelles	Yes	Yes	No	Short film; won Best Drama at the Santa Monica Film Festival	

== Awards and nominations ==
Year	Award	Category	Nominated work	Result	Ref.
2024	Santa Monica Film Festival Best Drama Award	Best Drama	Rochelles	Won	
