= Prince Michael (disambiguation) =

Prince Michael (born 1942) is the youngest child of Prince George, Duke of Kent, and a grandson of George V.

Prince Michael may also refer to:

- Mikhail Semyonovich Vorontsov (1782–1856), Russian field marshal and noble prince
- Mihailo Obrenović, Prince of Serbia (1823–1868; r. 1839–1842, 1860–1868)
- Michael, Prince of Montenegro (1908–1986), pretender to the Montenegrin throne
- Michael I, King of Romania (1921–2017; r. 1927–1930, 1940–1947), Romanian prince by birth
- Prince Michael of Greece and Denmark (1939–2024), grandson of George I of Greece
- Michael Bates (Sealand) (born 1952 or 1953), self-styled as Prince Michael of Sealand
- Prince Michael of Yugoslavia (born 1985), grandson of Alexander I of Yugoslavia

== See also ==
- Michael (disambiguation)
- Mikhail, Prince of Abkhazia (1806–1866)
- Prince Jackson (born 1997), eldest child of Michael Jackson
- Prince Michael Jackson II (born 2002), third child of Michael Jackson and nicknamed Blanket
