= Debbie Rowe =

Second wife of Michael Jackson (born 1958)

- Born: Deborah Jeanne Rowe; December 6, 1958 (age 67); Spokane, Washington, U.S.
- Education: Hollywood High School
- Known for: Marriage with Michael Jackson
- Spouses: Richard Edelman (m. 1982; div. 1988) Michael Jackson (m. 1996; div. 2000)
- Children: Prince; Paris

Deborah Jeanne Rowe (born December 6, 1958) is an American medical assistant based in the United States who famously became the second wife of pop musician Michael Jackson, with whom she had two children.

== Early life ==
Deborah Jeanne Rowe was born on December 6, 1958, in Spokane, Washington, to Barbara Chilcutt and Gordon Rowe. Her father divorced her mother a few weeks before her second birthday. She was raised by her mother, a few aunts, and her maternal grandmother.

== Personal life ==
=== First marriage ===
Rowe married Richard Edelman in 1982 and converted to Judaism. The couple divorced six years later.

=== Relationship with Michael Jackson ===
Rowe met Michael Jackson while working as an assistant in Arnold Klein's dermatology office, where Jackson was being treated for vitiligo. She recalled that after Jackson's divorce from Lisa Marie Presley in 1996, he was upset that he might never become a father. Rowe, a longtime Jackson fan, proposed to bear his children. In an interview with Playboy, Lisa Marie said that during her marriage to Jackson, he knew that Rowe wanted to have his children and that Rowe had "a crush on him".

==== Children and marriage ====
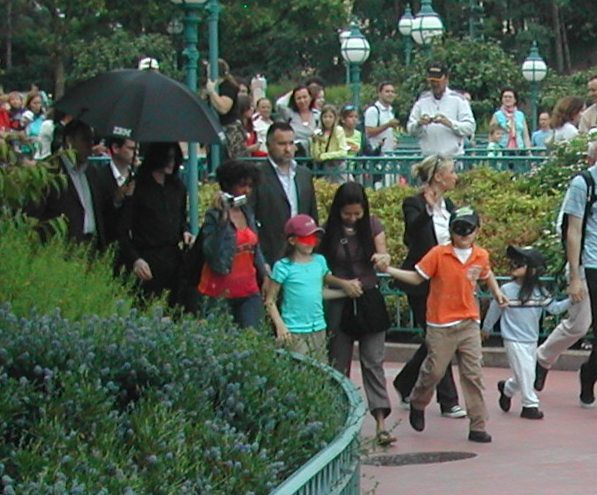
Michael Jackson with his three children Paris, Prince, and Blanket (the first two of whom are the oldest and were borne by Rowe), in Disneyland Resort Paris in 2006

Rowe had suffered a miscarriage in 1996, which devastated her. Jackson consoled her throughout the ordeal, and it was announced Rowe was pregnant again in 1996; the two were married on November 15, 1996, in Sydney, Australia.

Rowe had a son, Michael Joseph Jackson Jr. (born February 13, 1997, at Cedars-Sinai Medical Center in Los Angeles), who was subsequently nicknamed Prince. On April 3, 1998, she gave birth to daughter Paris Jackson at Spaulding Pain Medical Clinic in Beverly Hills in Los Angeles. Jackson took full responsibility for raising the children.

==== Divorce ====
Rowe, who has called herself a private person and almost never gives interviews, was overwhelmed by the publicity that came with being married to Jackson. The couple divorced in April 2000, and Rowe gave Jackson full custody of the children. She received an $8 million settlement and a house in Beverly Hills. Court documents indicate she had signed a prenuptial agreement and, therefore, could not obtain an equal division of community property under California law.

In 2001, Rowe went to a private judge to have her parental rights for the two children terminated. In 2004, after Jackson was charged with 10 counts of child abuse, she went to court to have the decision reversed. According to the Jewish Telegraphic Agency, Rowe sought the reversal in part because she feared the nanny and some of Jackson's siblings were exposing the children to teachings of the Nation of Islam. Court documents from 2005 say, "Because she is Jewish, Deborah feared the children might be mistreated if Michael continued the association." On the stand, in the 2005 People v. Jackson case, she said she had been granted visits with her children for eight hours every 45 days.

In 2005, Rowe sold her Beverly Hills house for $1.3 million and bought a ranch in Palmdale. In 2006, she sued Jackson for one immediate payment of $195,000 and one payment of $50,000 to pursue a child custody case. Jackson was ordered to pay her $60,000 in legal fees.

== Career since the death of Jackson ==
After Jackson died on June 25, 2009, Rowe made statements through her attorney to deny a series of stories, including reports that she was not the children's biological mother and that she was attempting to bargain her parental rights for money.

In July 2009, she filed a lawsuit for defamation and invasion of privacy against a source who handed over alleged private emails to the television entertainment news program Extra, and on March 3, 2010, she was awarded $27,000 in damages, though she had sought $500,000.

In August 2009, Rowe reached a settlement with Katherine Jackson, the children's guardian, under which Rowe had rights to supervised visits.

In April 2014, Rowe announced on Entertainment Tonight that she was engaged to music producer and former Neverland Ranch videographer Marc Schaffel, who worked with Jackson on his 9/11 charity single "What More Can I Give". Schaffel was the only Jackson employee allowed to visit Rowe after their divorce, and he had assisted Rowe with her health problems.

In 2016, Rowe was diagnosed with breast cancer.

== In popular culture ==
Rowe was portrayed by April Telek in the 2004 film Man in the Mirror: The Michael Jackson Story.
