= Paris Jackson =

American model, actress and singer (born 1998)

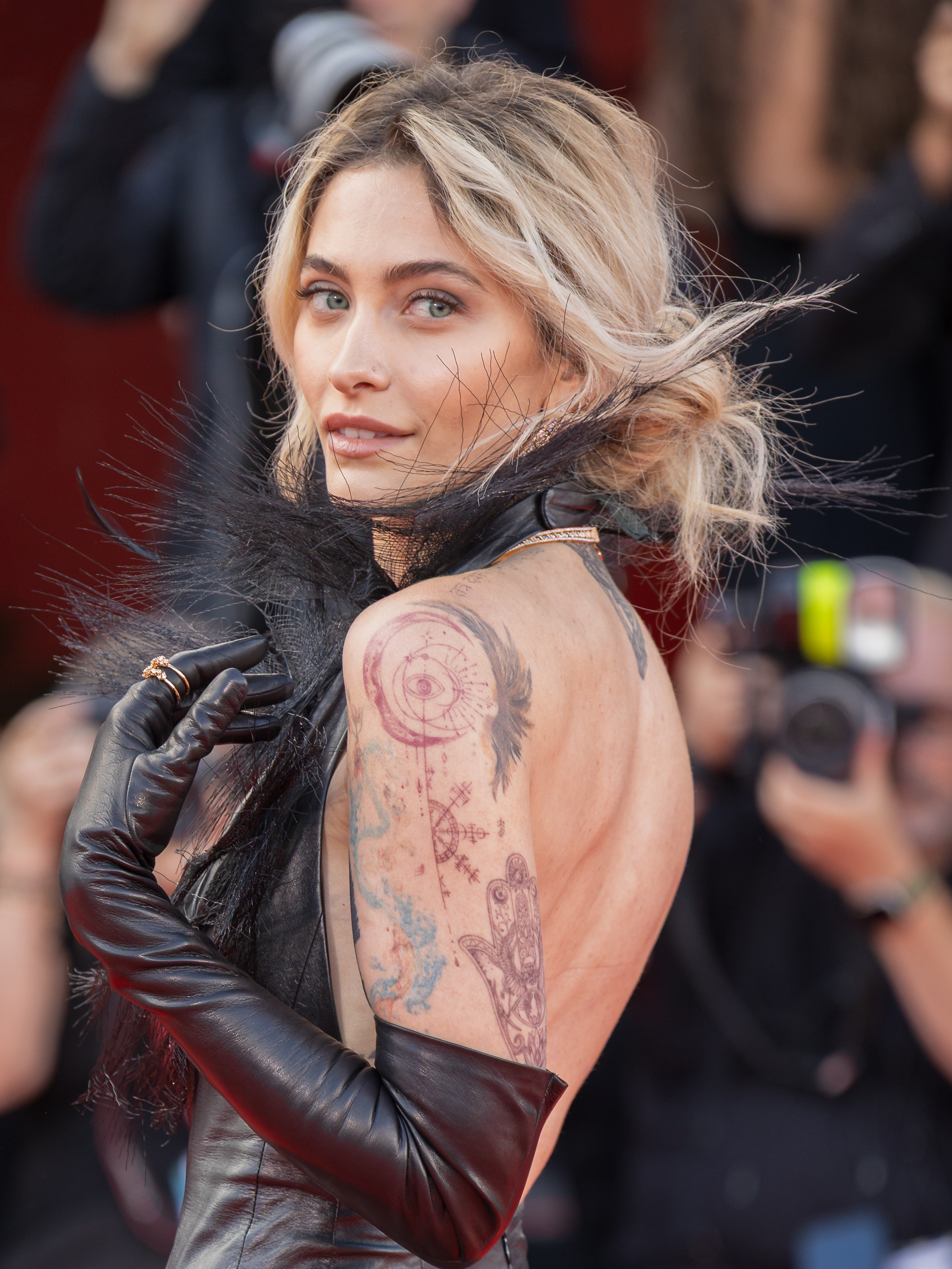
- Jackson in 2025
- Born: Paris-Michael Katherine Jackson; April 3, 1998 (age 28); Beverly Hills, California, U.S.
- Occupations: Model; actress; singer
- Years active: 2010–present
- Partner: Justin Long (2022–2025)
- Parents: Michael Jackson (father); Debbie Rowe (mother)
- Family: Jackson
- Modeling information
- Height: 5 ft 8 in (173 cm)
- Hair color: Brown
- Eye color: Blue
- Agency: IMG Models (New York, Paris, Milan, London, Sydney)

Paris-Michael Katherine Jackson (born April 3, 1998) is an American model, actress, and singer. The second child and daughter of Michael Jackson and Debbie Rowe, Jackson signed a deal with Republic Records in 2020. Her debut album, Wilted, was released that year.

== Early life ==
Paris-Michael Katherine Jackson was born on April 3, 1998, at Spaulding Pain Medical Clinic in Beverly Hills, California, and was named after the French capital city in which she was conceived. Her name also comes from a promise that her father, aunt La Toya, and Kathy Hilton made when they were younger that if they had a daughter, they would name her Paris. She is the middle child and only daughter of singer Michael Jackson, and the younger child of Debbie Rowe. Rowe is Jewish, which makes Paris Jewish by birth according to Jewish law. She has an older brother, Michael Joseph Jackson Jr. (Prince). and a younger half-brother, Prince Michael Jackson II (Bigi), formerly known as Blanket. Paris was raised solely by her father, who received full custody after he and Rowe divorced in 2000; Rowe had said it was her intention and agreed upon with Michael that he would raise and have custody of the children. Reports alleged that the relationship was an "economic" transaction for Rowe, as Jackson wanted a baby. Paris grew up at Neverland Ranch with her siblings. Her father made Elizabeth Taylor and Macaulay Culkin the godparents of her and her brother Prince. During her childhood, she and her siblings often wore masks during public outings with their father to hide their faces from the public and press.

When Michael Jackson unexpectedly died on June 25, 2009, she and her siblings were taken into the care of their grandmother and their cousin Tito Joe Jackson ("TJ"). On July 7, 2009, during the televised memorial for Michael, then 11-year-old Jackson concluded the service saying, "I just wanted to say, ever since I was born, Daddy has been the best father you could ever imagine." Consoled by her aunts, uncles and grandmother, she continued, "And I just wanted to say I love him so much", before she burst into tears and threw herself into her aunt Janet Jackson's arms.

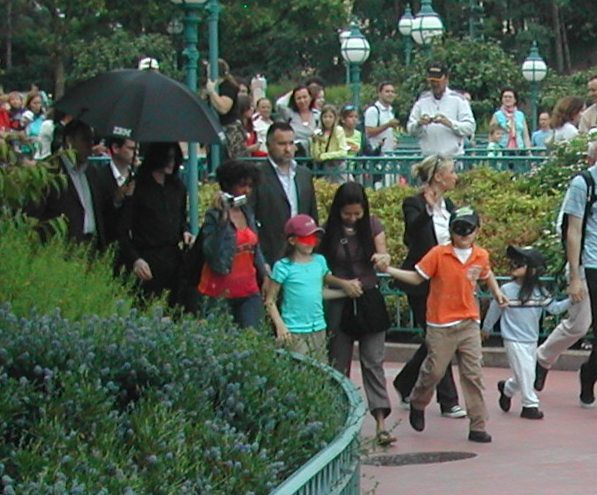
Paris with her father Michael, brother Prince, and half-brother Bigi at Disneyland Resort Paris in 2006

In 2011, Jackson signed on to star in the children's fantasy film Lundon's Bridge and the Three Keys, a story adapted from a book by Dennis Christen, but it was not produced.

Jackson, Prince, Bigi, and their grandmother Katherine made plans to put together a documentary film called Remembering Michael in remembrance of Michael. It had been hoped that costs associated with the making of the project would be paid by fans through the crowdfunding site FundAnything. But due to the uproar from the fans and media sparked by this method, Katherine shut the campaign down. In a sneak peek of the documentary, Paris remarked that her father had promised to teach her his famous dance move, the Moonwalk, but never had the chance. Since the shutdown of the online campaign, no updates have been reported about this project. In 2010, Jackson and her brothers gave an interview for Oprah Winfrey alongside their grandmother Katherine and their cousins about life after her father's death. She and her brother Prince also accepted the Lifetime Achievement Award at the 2010 Grammy Awards on their father's behalf. Jackson enrolled at the Buckley School, an exclusive private school in Sherman Oaks, California, along with her brother Prince. There, she participated in flag football, softball, and cheerleading.

== Career ==
=== 2017–2018: Career beginnings ===
In January 2017, Jackson appeared on the cover of Rolling Stone.

In March 2017, Jackson signed a modeling contract with IMG Models. Also in March, she made her acting debut with a guest starring role on FOX's Star.

Jackson made her feature film debut in Gringo in 2018.

She and musician/singer Gabriel Glenn formed a musical duo called The Soundflowers and performed their first gig at Canyon Sessions on June 23, 2018, with original songs "Daisy" and "In the Blue". Jackson sings and plays the ukulele while Glenn also sings and plays acoustic guitar. The Soundflowers released their first self-titled EP on June 24, 2020.

=== 2019–present ===
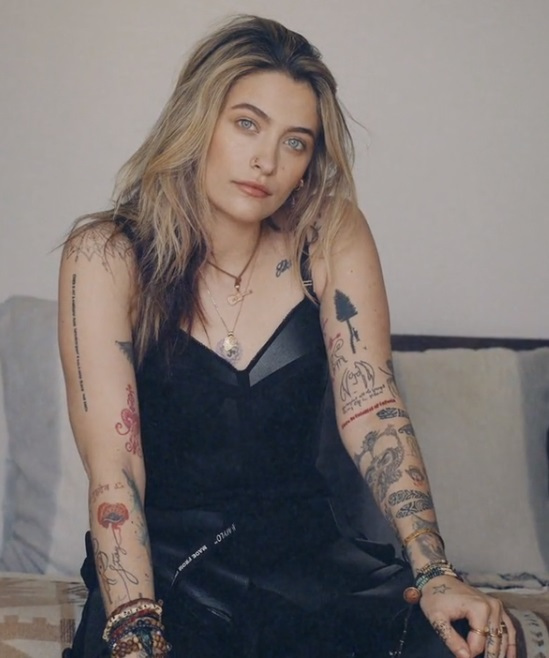
Jackson in 2021

On June 24, 2019, the eve of the 10th anniversary of her father's death, it was confirmed that Jackson would appear in the third season of the VH1 television series Scream. She then appeared in Habit, portraying Jesus Christ. Jackson also signed a deal with Republic Records. Her first single, "Let Down", was released on October 29, 2020, with an accompanying video. Her debut album, Wilted, was released on November 13, 2020.

In 2021 the song "Notes on a ghost" performed by Paris Jackson and Gabriel Glenn won the Best Music award at the Top Indie Film Awards. The song was part of the soundtrack of the film The Passenger which was directed by Alexander Bruckner. On April 22, 2021, it was reported that Jackson joined the cast of the tenth season of the FX anthology horror series, American Horror Story in an undisclosed role. She starred as Maya in the first story of the American Horror Story spinoff series, American Horror Stories, which premiered July 15, 2021.

On June 12, 2022, Jackson attended the 75th Tony Awards with her brother Prince in support of the Broadway musical MJ the Musical and lead actor Myles Frost who won the Tony Award for Best Actor in a Musical. Frost won the Tony Award for portraying Jackson's father Michael Jackson. MJ the Musical won a total of four awards that night. Jackson and Prince introduced a performance from the musical. Both siblings attended the opening night of the musical at the Neil Simon Theatre in New York along with cousin TJ, son of Tito of the Jackson 5.

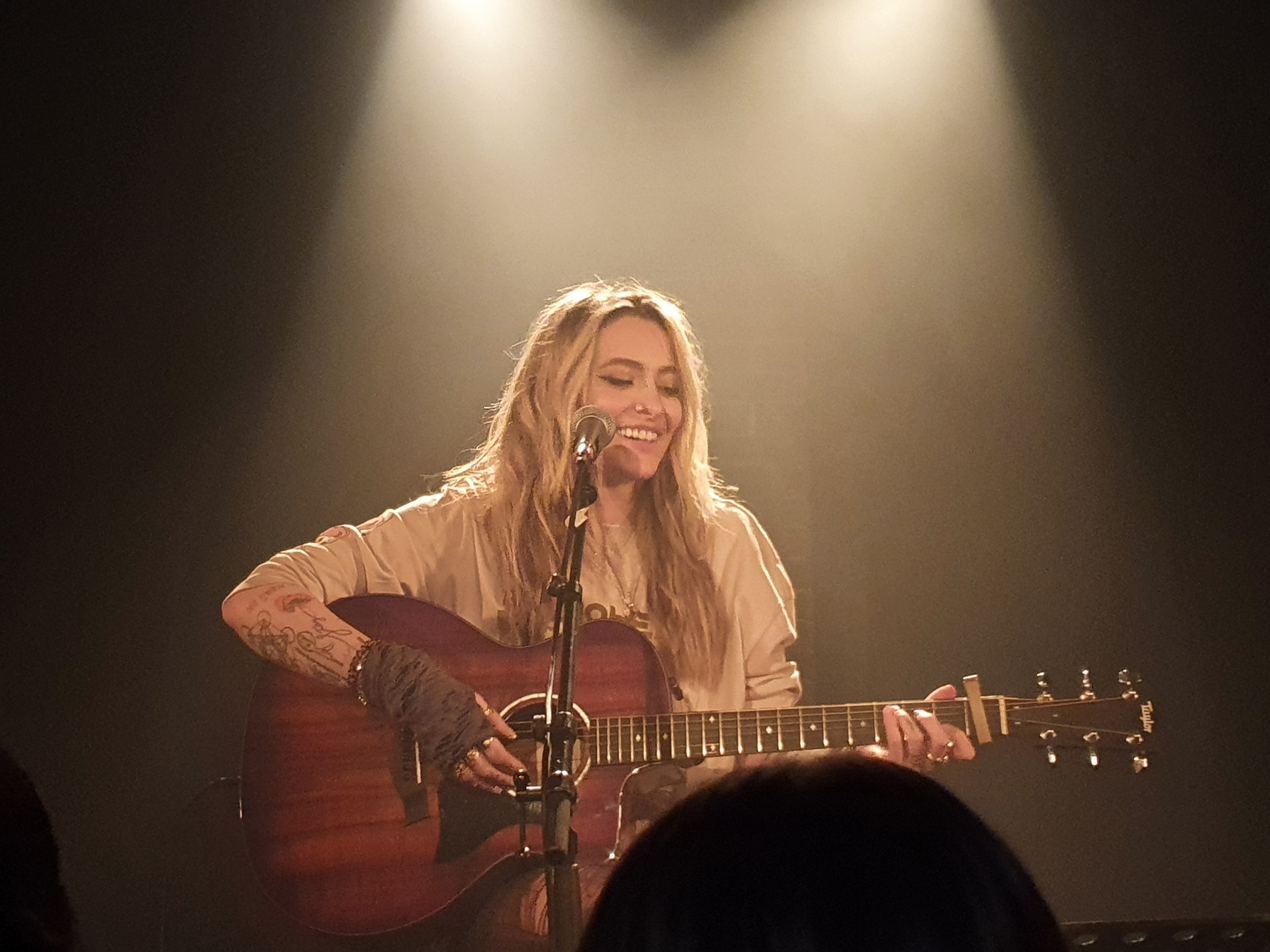
Jackson performing in 2022

On February 18, 2022, Jackson shared the Lost EP. The EP includes a collaboration with Caamp called "Lost", and solo songs "Breathe Again" and "Never Going Back Again". In June 2022, Jackson released the single and the following music video to "Lighthouse". The video has a 1990s-rock grunge vibe that pays homage to Nirvana and Kurt Cobain. On October 28, 2022, Jackson released a single titled "Just You".

In September 2024, Jackson walked the runway at Paris Fashion Week S/S 2025 for Maison Yoshiki Paris, the high fashion brand created by Japanese rock star Yoshiki.

In July 2025, Paris Jackson formally objected to the Jackson estate's request for legal fees, raising concerns about "irregular payments", including so‑called "premium payments" for unrecorded attorney time, and urged the court to deny the request until full invoicing was provided.

== Personal life ==
Jackson has said that she is multiracial, but considers herself Black and that she was immersed in African-American culture by her father, Michael.

By the age of 15, Jackson was an intravenous drug addict, had been sexually assaulted by a stranger, and had attempted suicide multiple times. She was then sent to a therapeutic school in Utah, where she spent her sophomore and junior years of high school. In 2020, Jackson revealed that the school had extensively abused her and the other students. The revelation came in response to Paris Hilton's documentary This Is Paris, in which Hilton describes being verbally, physically, and sexually abused at Provo Canyon School, a therapeutic school in Provo, Utah. Jackson posted to her Instagram account, "As a girl who also went to a behavior modification 'boarding school' for almost two years as a teenager, and has since been diagnosed with PTSD because of it, and continue to have nightmares and trust issues, I stand with @ParisHilton and the other survivors. The other girls I'm still friends with to this day that went to the boarding school with me all have the same symptoms of PTSD and nightmares and trust issues. This is child abuse. ... Let's start with Provo and keep going from there."

In 2019, TMZ reported that Jackson had attempted suicide by cutting her wrists and had been placed on a psychiatric hold. The story was picked up by a number of other media outlets. Jackson denied the story, writing to TMZ on Twitter, "fuck you you fucking liars" and "lies lies lies omg and more lies." On June 16, 2021, Jackson appeared on the Facebook Watch show Red Table Talk, where she was interviewed by her friend Willow Smith. Jackson said she experienced PTSD as a result of being followed by paparazzi, but her mental health had improved, and she had found ways to cope, such as music, practicing affirmations, and therapy.

On July 13, 2018, in response to a question on her Instagram profile about whether she is bisexual, she wrote, "That's what you guys call it so i [sic] guess but who needs labels". She later wrote on Twitter, "Everyone has known for years I came out when I was 14, WTF." and "How many times have I publicly referred to the community as 'my fellow LGBTQ+'? Like, even on stage. I've been a part of the community for years. I even mentioned having crushes on girls when I was eight in a magazine before. I've been caught kissing girls in public." On her Instagram page, she wrote: "And I'm not bisexual, I just love people for people." In July 2020, Jackson discussed her sexuality in her docuseries Unfiltered: Paris Jackson & Gabriel Glenn, saying, "Never thought I'd end up with a dude; thought I'd end up marrying a chick or [...]". She also said she had "dated more women than men" but "wouldn't consider myself bisexual because I've dated more than just men and women; I've dated a man that had a vagina." Jackson refuses to label her sexual orientation.

On May 31, 2020, Jackson joined the protests after George Floyd's murder in solidarity with Black Lives Matter. She posted a photo of herself on Instagram holding a sign that read "Peace Love Justice". Jackson is an ambassador for the Elizabeth Taylor AIDS Foundation and Heal Los Angeles Foundation. She has said she began modeling to grow her platform and draw more attention to activism.

From 2024 to July 2025, Jackson was engaged to music producer Justin Long.

== Discography ==
=== Studio albums ===
List of studio albums
Title	Album details
Wilted	Released: November 13, 2020; Label: Republic; Formats: CD, Digital download, streaming
Happiest Day of My Life	Released: August 21, 2026; Label: Dragonflower Enterprises, Republic; Formats: LP, CD, Digital download, streaming

=== Extended plays ===
List of extended plays
Title	EP details
The Soundflowers (As part of The Soundflowers)	Released: June 23, 2020; Label: self-released; Formats: Digital download, streaming
The Lost EP	Released: February 18, 2022; Label: Republic; Formats: Digital download, streaming

=== Singles ===
List of singles as lead artist, showing year released and album name
Title	Year	Album
"Let Down"	2020	Wilted
"Lighthouse"	2022	Non-album singles
"Just You"	2022	Non-album singles
"Bandaid"	2023	Non-album singles

=== Guest appearances ===
List of non-single guest appearances, with other performing artists, showing year released and album name
Title	Year	Other performer(s)	Album
"Running for So Long (House a Home)"	2019	Parker Ainsworth, Butch Walker, Jessie Payo	The Peanut Butter Falcon
"Low Key in Love"	2021	The Struts	Non-album single

== Filmography ==
Key
†	Denotes films that have not yet been released

=== Film ===
Year	Title	Role	Notes	Refs.
2018	Gringo	Nelly		
2021	The Space Between	Cory		
2021	Habit	Jesus		
2022	Sex Appeal	Danica McCollum		
2025	One Spoon of Chocolate	Darla		
2026	Street Smart	Lil Rocky		

=== Television ===
Year	Title	Role	Notes	Refs.
2003	Living with Michael Jackson	Herself	Television special documentary	
2003	Michael Jackson's Private Home Movies	Herself	Television special documentary	
2009	Michael Jackson memorial service	Herself		
2010	The 52nd Annual Grammy Awards	Herself	Television special	
2010	The Oprah Winfrey Show	Herself		
2011	The X Factor	Herself		
2011	The Ellen DeGeneres Show	Herself	Episode dated: "December 15, 2011"	
2012	Oprah Prime	Herself	Episode dated: "June 11, 2012"	
2017	59th Annual Grammy Awards	Herself	Television special	
2017	Star	Rachel Wallace	4 episodes	
2017	28th GLAAD Media Awards	Herself	Television special	
2017	The Tonight Show Starring Jimmy Fallon	Herself	Episode dated: "March 20, 2017"	
2017	2017 MTV Video Music Awards	Herself	Television special	
2019	Scream	Becky	Episode: "The Deadfast Club"	
2019	Vogue	Herself	"Paris and Prince Jackson Get Ready Together"	
2020	Jimmy Kimmel Live!	Herself	Episode dated: "December 3, 2020"	
2021	American Horror Stories	Maya	3 episodes	
2022	75th Tony Awards	Herself	Television special	
2022	The Tonight Show Starring Jimmy Fallon	Herself	Episode dated: "June 21, 2022"	
2023	Swarm	Hailey	Episode: "Honey"	
2025	Doctor Odyssey	Vanessa	Episode: "Spring Break"	

=== Music videos ===
Year	Title	Artist	Role
2016	"She's Tight"	Steel Panther	Herself
2017	"I Dare You"	The xx	Teenager
2017	"Dragonfly"	Nahko and Medicine for the People	Herself
2018	"Rescue Me"	Thirty Seconds to Mars	Herself
2020	"Your look (Glorious)"	The Soundflowers	Herself
2020	"Let Down"	Paris Jackson	Herself
2021	"Eyelids"	Paris Jackson & Andy Hull	Herself
2021	"Low Key in Love"	The Struts & Paris Jackson	Herself
2022	"Lighthouse"	Paris Jackson	Herself
2022	"Ur A Stranger"	Willow Smith	Love Interest
2024	"Crack Cocaine"	Billy Morrison, Ozzy Osbourne & Steve Stevens	Herself

== Awards and nominations ==
Year	Award	Category	Work	Result	Refs.
2017	Daily Front Row	Emerging Talent Award	Herself	Won	
2017	Teen Choice Awards	Choice Model	Herself	Nominated	
2017	Teen Choice Awards	Choice Female Hottie	Herself	Nominated	
2021	Top Indie Film Awards	Best Music	The Soundflowers	Won	
