= Prince Jackson =

Son of Michael Jackson (born 1997)

- Born: Michael Joseph Jackson Jr. February 13, 1997 (age 29); Los Angeles, California, U.S.
- Education: Loyola Marymount University
- Occupations: Actor, YouTuber
- Partner(s): Molly Schirmang (2017–present; engaged)
- Parents: Michael Jackson (father); Debbie Rowe (mother)
- Family: Jackson family

Michael Joseph "Prince" Jackson Jr. (born February 13, 1997) is the eldest child of Michael Jackson and Debbie Rowe. He co‑founded the Heal Los Angeles Foundation while studying at Loyola Marymount University, supporting community programs and pandemic‑related food assistance. He later worked as an executive producer on Michael (2026), a biographical film about his father, Michael Jackson.

== Early life and education ==
Michael Joseph Jackson Jr. was born on February 13, 1997, at Cedars-Sinai Medical Center in Los Angeles, California, to Michael Jackson and his then‑wife, Debbie Rowe. His godparents are Macaulay Culkin and Elizabeth Taylor. At the time of Jackson's birth, Michael released a public statement and requested privacy for his son.

Jackson's younger sister, Paris, was born in 1998. His parents divorced in 1999, after which his father received full custody of both children. They spent their childhood at the Neverland Ranch in Santa Barbara County, where they were raised by their father along with their younger half‑brother, Prince Michael, who was born in 2002. Following their father's death in June 2009, Jackson and his siblings were placed under the legal guardianship of their grandmother, Katherine Jackson; in 2012, the court approved a joint guardianship arrangement with their cousin T. J. Jackson.

Jackson was homeschooled during his early childhood and later attended the Buckley School in Sherman Oaks, California. He graduated from Loyola Marymount University in 2019 with a degree in business administration.

== Career ==
While studying at Loyola Marymount University, Jackson co‑founded the charity Heal Los Angeles Foundation with a fellow student. In 2020, the organization worked with a meal-delivery partner to provide food to residents affected by the COVID-19 pandemic.

Jackson served as an executive producer on Michael (2026), a biographical film about his father. It is the highest‑grossing biopic of all time, earning more than $1 billion worldwide.

== Personal life ==
In August 2025, Jackson announced on Instagram that he was engaged to his partner, Molly Schirmang. The couple have been together since 2017.
