= Neverland Ranch =

Home of Michael Jackson from 1988 to 2005

Neverland Valley Ranch
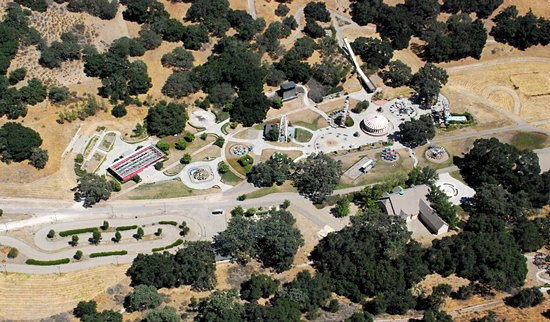
- Neverland Ranch amusement rides pictured in August 2006
- Interactive map of Neverland Valley Ranch
- Location: 5225 Figueroa Mountain Road, Los Olivos, California, United States
- Coordinates: 34°44′28″N 120°05′30″W
- Status: Defunct
- Owner: Ronald Burkle
- Area: 2,700 acres (1,100 ha)

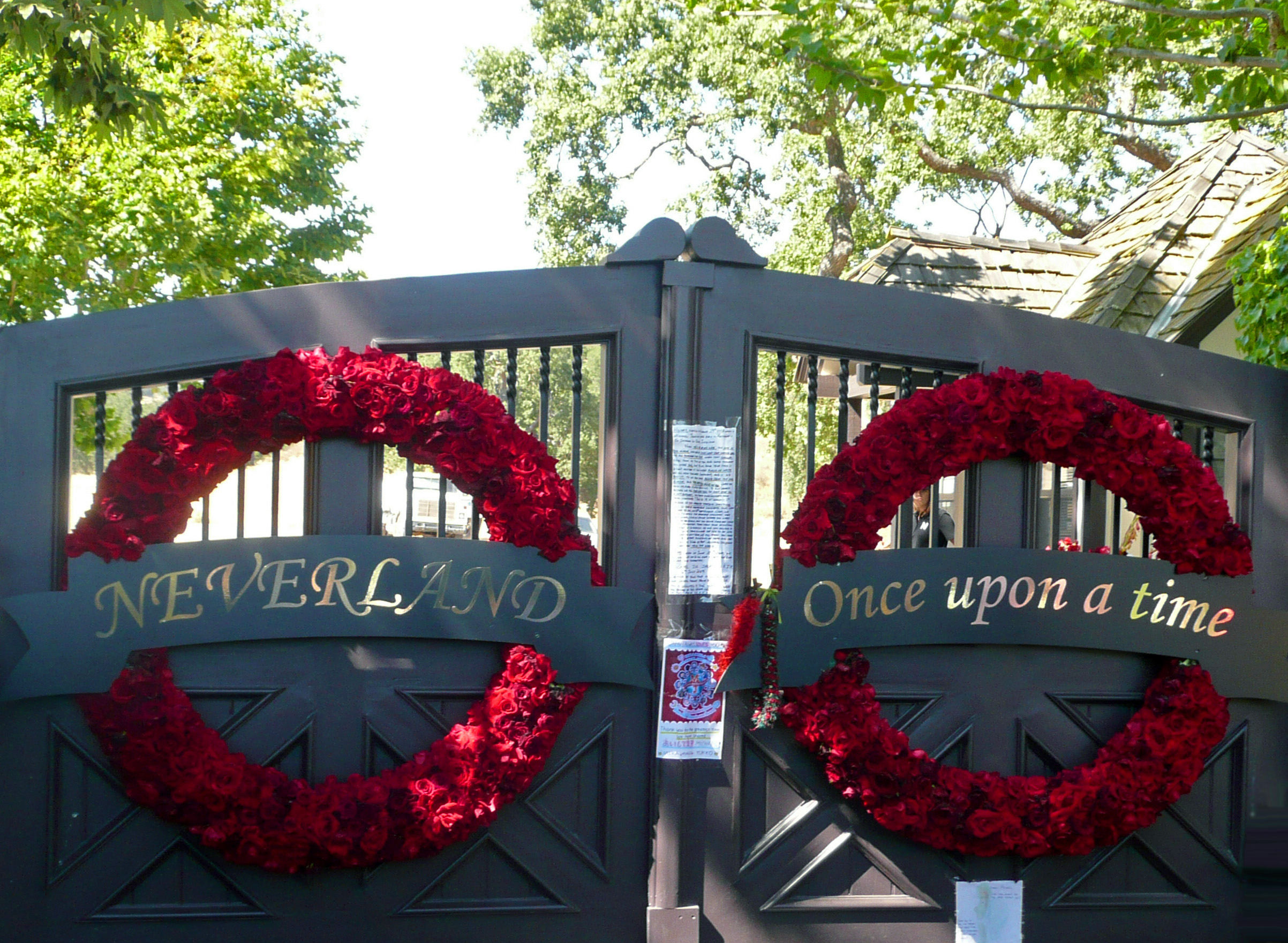
Neverland Ranch gates

Sycamore Valley Ranch, formerly Neverland Ranch or Neverland Valley Ranch, is a developed property in Santa Barbara County, California, on the edge of Los Padres National Forest. From 1988 to 2005, it was the home of the American singer Michael Jackson. The ranch is about five miles (8 km) north of the unincorporated community of Los Olivos, and about eight miles (13 km) north of the town of Santa Ynez.

Originally named Zaca Laderas Ranch, the estate was renamed Sycamore Valley Ranch shortly after it was purchased by the property developer William Bone in 1981. Jackson first visited the ranch when he visited Paul McCartney, who was staying there during their filming of the "Say Say Say" music video in 1983. Jackson purchased it for an undisclosed amount in 1988 and renamed it after Neverland, the fantasy island in the story of Peter Pan, a boy who never ages. He installed features including an amusement park that had a similar theme to Disneyland which was Jackson’s favourite theme park, a petting zoo with several animals and a train station with a large floral clock.

He owned it until his death in 2009. After the property had depreciated for several years, the American billionaire businessman Ronald Burkle, a friend of the Jackson family, purchased it in 2020 for US$22 million after years of failing to find a buyer.

== Background ==
The estate was known as the Zaca Laderas Ranch at the time of its purchase by the property developer William Bone in 1981. Bone renamed the estate the Sycamore Valley Ranch and moved there with his family. Bone commissioned the architect Robert Altevers to design the principal buildings on the ranch, and the pair spent two and a half years researching potential designs and ideas. The 13,000-square-foot (1,200 m^{2}) main house was completed in 1982, based on a design by Altevers, with formal gardens, a stone bridge, and a four-acre (1.5 ha) lake with a five-foot (1.5 m) waterfall. Bone later said that in building the house he had "...a desire to express everything I had learned in 15 years of home building...I achieved here all the things I wanted to do in my business but could not". He had considered converting the property to a country club but did not do so. The gardening and landscape design was led by Thomas A. Stone.

== Residence of Michael Jackson ==
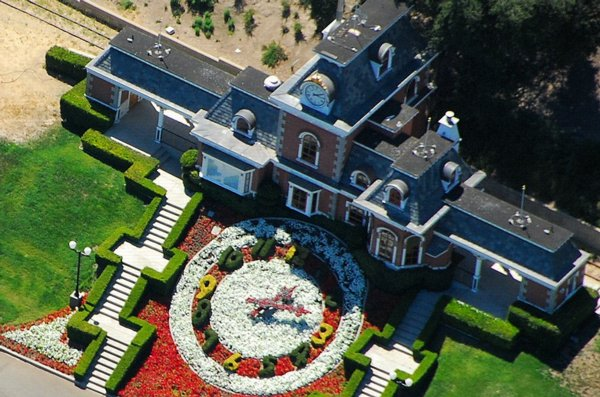
Neverland's train station, Katherine Station, with floral clock

Prior to taking up residence at the ranch, Jackson lived with his family at Hayvenhurst. He purchased the estate from Bone in March 1988 for an unknown amount; some sources indicate $19.5 million while others suggest it was closer to $30 million. The property was initially purchased by a trust with Jackson's lawyer, John Branca, and his accountant, Marshall Gelfand, as trustees, for reasons of privacy. The arrangement was later rescinded by Jackson in April 1988 and he became the ultimate owner of the property. It was Jackson's home as well as his private amusement park, with numerous garden statues, amusement rides, and a petting zoo.

The property included three railroads: one 3 ft (914 mm) narrow gauge named "Neverland Valley Railroad", with a steam locomotive named Katherine after his mother (Crown 4-4-0 (2B), built-in 1973), and two coaches. The other was a 2 ft (610 mm) narrow gauge, with a C. P. Huntington replica locomotive made by Chance Rides. There was also a custom-made private electric train that was purchased by Jackson for his own children, Michael Jr., Paris, and Prince II. The train was manufactured in 2001 by a German company Elektro-Mobiltechnik. The train was set up in the yard at Neverland behind the main house and had 100 feet (30 m) of track.

There was also a Ferris wheel, carousel, zipper, octopus, pirate ship, wave swinger, Super Slide, roller coaster, bumper cars, and an amusement arcade. The master closet also contained a secret safe room for security.

Some of the events that took place at the Ranch included the wedding of Elizabeth Taylor and Larry Fortensky in October 1991 and the live Oprah Winfrey interview of Jackson in February 1993. In 1995, Jackson and his then-wife Lisa Marie Presley hosted children from around the world for a three-day World Children's Congress, a series of seminars and workshops on issues facing kids around the globe, as part of the 50th anniversary celebration of the United Nations.

On November 18, 2003, while Jackson was producing the music video for One More Chance. a search warrant was executed at Neverland Ranch in connection with the People v. Jackson trial after Jackson was charged with multiple counts of molesting a minor. Jackson was acquitted of all charges. However, Jackson stated following the acquittal in 2005 he would never live at the property again as he no longer considered the ranch a home and did not return to Neverland. Jackson's sister, La Toya, wrote of her experience staying at the ranch during her brother's trial in her 2012 memoir Starting Over. The main house at Neverland Ranch was closed in 2006 as a cost-cutting measure, while Jackson lived in Bahrain at the hospitality of Sheik Abdullah, the ruler's son.

Neverland Ranch had a central role in the allegations against Jackson of alleged child sexual abuse; it is one of the main sites where Jackson's accusers have said the alleged sexual abuse took place. The ranch's association with sexual abuse allegations was described as a possible reason for a significant depreciation.

== Financial status ==
Reports of foreclosure proceedings against Neverland Ranch were published in 2007 two years after Jackson stopped living there. A spokesperson for Jackson said that the loan was merely being refinanced and Jackson (later his estate) remained the majority stake holder, with a legal retention of 87.5% of the ranch.

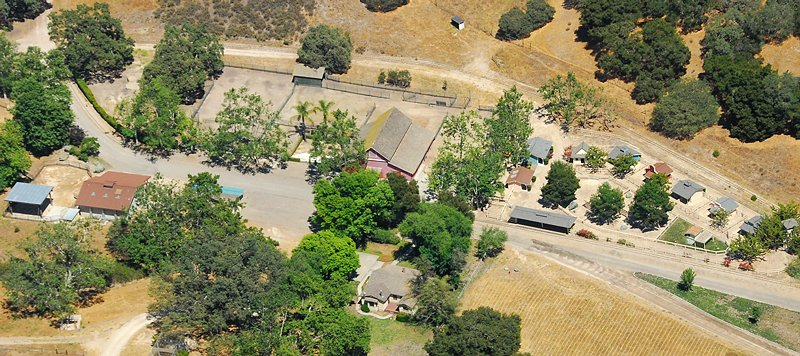
Former zoo buildings, July 2009

On February 25, 2008, Jackson received word from Financial Title Company, the trustee, that unless he paid off $24,525,906.61 by March 19, a public auction would go forward of the land, buildings, and other items such as the rides, trains, and art. On March 13, 2008, Jackson's lawyer L. Londell McMillan announced that a private agreement had been reached with the private investment group, Fortress Investment, to save Jackson's ownership of the ranch. Before the agreement, Jackson owed three months' arrears on the property. McMillan did not reveal the details of the deal.

On May 12, 2008, a foreclosure auction for the ranch was canceled after Colony Capital, an investment company run by billionaire Tom Barrack, purchased the loan, which was in default. The selling price was $22.5 million. In a press release, Jackson stated, "I am pleased with recent developments involving Neverland Ranch and I am in discussions with Colony and Tom Barrack with regard to the Ranch and other matters that would allow me to focus on the future."

On November 10, 2008, Jackson transferred the title to Sycamore Valley Ranch Company, LLC, and neighbors reported immediate activity on the property, including the amusement rides being trucked along the highway. Jackson still owned an unknown stake in the property, since Sycamore Valley Ranch was a joint venture between Jackson (represented by McMillan) and an affiliate of Colony Capital. The Santa Barbara County Assessor's Office stated Jackson sold an unknown proportion of his property rights for $35 million. Subsequent news reports however, indicated that Colony Capital had invested only $22.5 million in the property. In any event, reliable sources indicate that Colony was the majority owner.

Kyle Forsyth, Colony's project manager, described the estate's Tudor-style buildings and savanna-like grasslands as "English country manor meets Kenya." Colony hoped to sell the ranch, located in Santa Barbara County, in its entirety. Subdividing it, said Forsyth, "would destroy it".

The Zipper, Lolli Swing and Spider rides were purchased by Helm and Sons Amusements which also purchased rides for Jackson while Neverland's private amusement park was in operation. Butler Amusements, of Fairfield, California purchased six of the rides. Since their sale, these rides have appeared at county and state fairs across California, Oregon and Washington, sometimes with signs describing their Neverland origin. Archway Amusements Corp of Imperial, Missouri purchased the 65 feet (20 m) ferris wheel which was originally custom made for Jackson in 1990 for $215,000 by the manufacturer Eli Bridge Company of Jacksonville, Illinois.

Some rides were more permanently installed. The Dragon Wagon children's roller coaster was in operation at Dreamland at Coney Island, New York City for one season in 2009. The Sea Dragon swinging ship ride was purchased in 2008 by Beech Bend Park in Bowling Green, Kentucky. The bumper cars were permanently installed at CalExpo, site of the California State Fair. In 2013, the billionaire British businessman Jo Bamford made plans to buy the ranch, but never finished the deal.

== Death of Michael Jackson ==
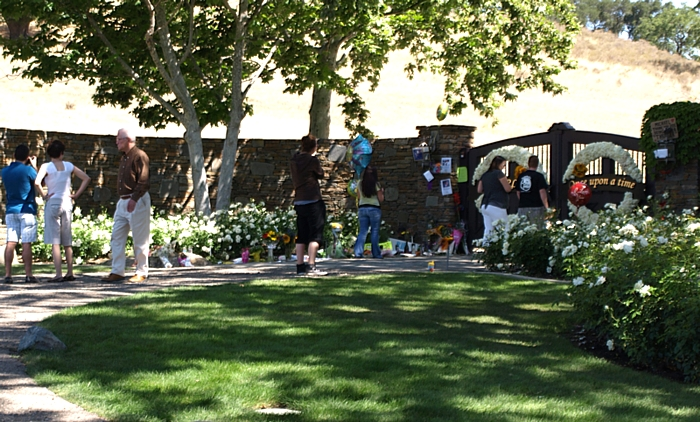
Fans visiting the makeshift memorial set up outside the Neverland Ranch entrance shortly after Jackson's death

Following Jackson's death, press reports during June 28–29, 2009, claimed that his family intended to bury him at the Neverland Ranch, eventually turning it into a place of pilgrimage for his fans, similar to how Graceland has become a destination for fans of Elvis Presley. Jackson's father Joseph Jackson later denied the reports. Construction equipment and gardeners entered the grounds on July 1, prompting speculation that preparations were being made for something related to Jackson's death, but local officials stated that a burial there would be only allowed if the owners of the ranch would go through a permitting process with county and state government before establishing a cemetery at the site. Jackson's 2002 will gives his entire estate to a family trust.

The ranch was the setting for two media appearances on July 2, 2009. Jackson's brother Jermaine took The Today Show's Matt Lauer on a tour of the main house, and he was interviewed on the grounds of the house by Larry King for his show. In January 2013, the singer Lady Gaga announced her willingness to help Jackson's children keep the ranch by investing in the property.

== Restoration ==
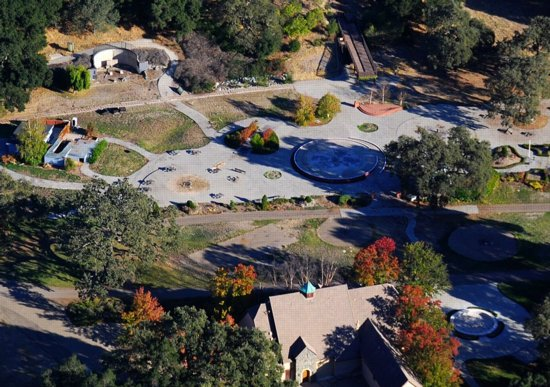
Aerial view after the carnival rides were removed

The amusement rides and animals–excluding the llamas–were gone by 2009, replaced with a meditative zen garden and a section decorated with Peter Pan, Jackson's favorite fictional hero.

In May 2015, it was announced that the Neverland Ranch, renamed Sycamore Valley Ranch, would be put up for sale with an initial asking price of $100 million. By that time, Colony NorthStar had completed extensive renovations. Many people, including fans, protested the decision. Jermaine Jackson wrote an open letter to Colony NorthStar expressing his disapproval.

As of May 2016, the 2,700-acre (1,100 ha) ranch, jointly owned by the Jackson estate and Colony NorthStar, was put up for sale by Sotheby's International Realty with an asking price of $100 million. The price included the 12,598-square-foot (1,170.4 m^{2}) six bedroom Normandy-style mansion, the 4-acre (1.6 ha) lake with a waterfall, a pool house, three guest houses, a tennis court, and a 5,500-square-foot (510 m^{2}) movie theater and stage. The train station and railway tracks were also included. According to Time, the owners were seeking a buyer who did not plan to turn the ranch into a Jackson museum.

Due to a lack of interest, the asking price of the ranch had fallen to $67 million by February 2017. The property was still on the market in early 2018, at the same price, with Coldwell Banker. In February 2019, the asking price was reduced to $31 million. The listing agent for the ranch said nothing had changed except the price. The structures and landscaping are still maintained.

In December 2020, the billionaire businessman Ronald Burkle, a friend of the Jackson family, purchased the property for $22 million as a "land banking opportunity". The ranch was evacuated as the Lake Fire burned nearby in 2024.
