= Buckley School (California) =

College preparatory school in Los Angeles, US

The Buckley School

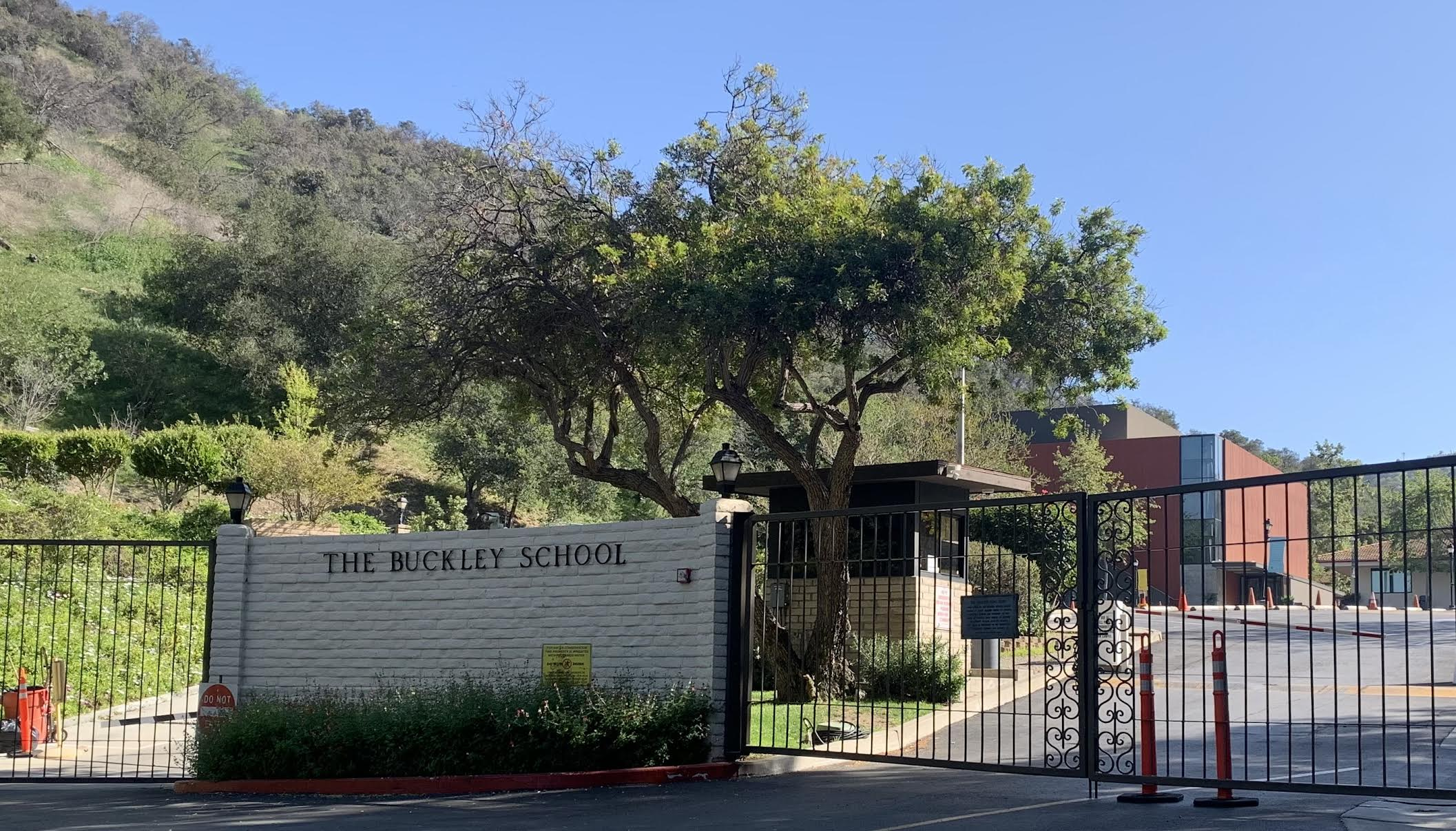

Location
- 3900 Stansbury Avenue; Sherman Oaks, California 91423; United States; 34.1397°N 118.4436°W

Information
- Type: Private, day, college preparatory
- Motto: Dare to Be True
- Religious affiliation: Nonsectarian
- Founded: 1933
- Founder: Isabelle Buckley
- Head of school: Alona Scott
- Faculty: 109
- Grades: K–12
- Gender: Co-educational
- Enrollment: 830 (2024)
- Student to teacher ratio: 8:1
- Hours in school day: 7
- Campus size: 18 acres (7.3 ha), 784,080 ft² (72,843.42 m²)
- Campus type: Large city
- Colors: Red & Black
- Fight song: Hail, Buckley!
- Athletics conference: CIF Southern Section
- Mascot: The Griffin
- Nickname: Griffins
- Team name: Buckley Griffins
- Rivals: Harvard Westlake, Brentwood, Campbell Hall, The Archer School for Girls, Milken Community School
- Publication: The Oxford Comma
- Newspaper: The Student Voice, The Junior Voice
- Yearbook: Images
- School fees: New student fee: $2,000
- Tuition: Lower school: $45,935; Upper school: $54,090
- Website: www.buckley.org

The Buckley School is a private, college preparatory day school for students in grades kindergarten through 12. Founded in 1933 by Isabelle Buckley, the school is located in Sherman Oaks in the San Fernando Valley portion of Los Angeles, California, in the United States. Buckley is one of the oldest co-educational day schools in the Los Angeles area.

== Description ==
The Buckley School is a K–12 school that enrolls a total of 830 students. Approximate division sizes are 270 in grade K–5; 210 in grades 6–8; and 345 in grades 9–12, allowing for an average class size of 17 students. The school's middle and upper divisions follow a six-day block schedule, with 70-minute class intervals. The school's lower division follows a five-day schedule and combines a developmental approach with structure. All divisions are located on a single 18-acre campus in Sherman Oaks, California. Buckley is accredited by the California Association of Independent Schools, the Western Association of Schools and Colleges, and the California Department of Education. It is also a member of the National Association of Independent Schools.

== History ==
The Buckley School was founded as an "independent co-educational institution" by Isabelle Buckley in 1933 based on her own "4-Fold Plan of Education", which equally emphasizes academics, arts, athletics, and an ethical education. Early campuses were located on Doheny Drive in Los Angeles, on Hayvenhurst Avenue in Van Nuys, and the school had two locations in Sherman Oaks, on Riverside Drive and Woodman Avenue. In 1964, Isabelle Buckley purchased land from the Glenaire Country Club in Sherman Oaks, and by 1973 all five divisions of the school were consolidated at the Stansbury Avenue location. In 2008, the city of Los Angeles approved campus enhancements to be completed over a six-year (non-consecutive) total building period.

By the end of 2016, the school added three new buildings to support academics, including science, technology, engineering, and math (STEM) classrooms, as well as the performing arts, including dance and music rehearsal spaces, a black-box theatre, and a performance space.

During 2019, several Buckley School families were implicated in the Varsity Blues scandal, where Buckley parents paid Rick Singer to get their children into elite colleges, including Georgetown University, Tulane University, and University of Southern California.

== Board of trustees ==
The composition of the board changes every year, as terms expire and new trustees are elected. Trustees can serve up to three, three-year terms and participate in at least two board committees each year of their trusteeship.

== Campus ==
Buckley's lower, middle, and upper divisions share a single 18-acre (7.3 ha) campus.

Buckley is one of the oldest co-educational day schools in Los Angeles, and one of the few with all K–12 students on one campus.

== Culture ==
The school's motto is "Dare to Be True". The "Buckley Commitment", which is displayed in all classrooms and is ceremonially signed by students and teachers at the start of each academic year, sets expectations for respect, kindness, honesty, loyalty, self-discipline and self-reliance.

As part of the dress code, boys are required to wear a combination of polo shirts, khakis pants, chinos, black jeans or shorts, sweaters in the school's colors (red, black, or gray) and Buckley sweatshirts; girls wear skirts, black jeans, sweaters in school colors, polo shirts, or Buckley sweatshirts.

Buckley's mascot is the griffin.

Interscholastic sports include baseball for male students and softball and volleyball for female students; co-ed sports include basketball, cross-country running, track and field, equestrian sports, soccer, swimming and diving, golf, fencing, and tennis. The school maintains a no-cut policy in Middle School athletics.

The school's newspaper is The Student Voice. In 1998, Los Angeles Times presented the school with a "general excellence award" as part of its annual High School Journalism Awards competition, earning Buckley $1,000 for its journalism program. In 2010 and 2012, The Student Voice received "High School Newspaper Silver Crown" awards from the Columbia Scholastic Press Association (CSPA). In 2015, individual contributors were recognized at the CSPA's 32nd Gold Circle Awards.

In 2002, the Performing Arts Department collaborated with writer and director Stuart Ross to present the world premiere of The Sounds of Plaid, a large-cast, co-ed version of Ross's Forever Plaid. In 2015, 34 students won 60 Scholastic Art Awards, which have been presented to student artists in grades 7–12 nationwide since 1923. Students earned awards in thirteen categories.

== Notable alumni ==
- Tatyana Ali, actress and singer
- Paul Thomas Anderson, filmmaker
- Christian Brando, actor
- Tevin Campbell, singer
- Natalie Cole, singer, songwriter and actress
- Laura Dern, actress
- Abigail Disney, producer and heiress
- Bret Easton Ellis, author, screenwriter and director
- Melissa Gilbert, actress and director
- Sara Gilbert, actress
- Albert Hammond Jr., musician and music producer
- Paris Hilton, media personality and socialite
- Gaby Hoffmann, actress
- Paris Jackson, model and musician
- Rashida Jones, actress
- Kim Kardashian, media personality
- Rob Kardashian, television personality and businessman
- Michael Landon Jr., actor and filmmaker
- Meredith MacRae, actress and singer
- Alyssa Milano, actress
- Tracy Nelson, actress
- David Niven Jr., actor
- Matthew Perry, actor
- Nicole Richie, actress and fashion designer
- Nicollette Sheridan, actress
- Jill Whelan, actress
