= Katherine Jackson =

Matriarch of the Jackson entertainment family (born 1930)

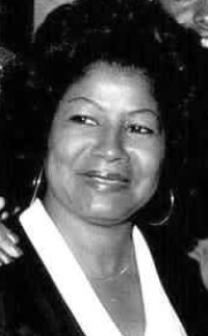
- Jackson in 1977
- Born: Kattie B. Screws; May 4, 1930 (age 96); Clayton, Alabama, U.S.
- Other name: Katherine Scruse
- Occupation: Author
- Spouse: Joe Jackson (m. 1949; died 2018)
- Children: 10, including Rebbie, Jackie, Tito, Jermaine, La Toya, Marlon, Michael, Randy & Janet
- Family: Jackson

Katherine Esther Jackson (née Scruse; (Note: Although Katherine was born with the surname Screws, her father altered the surname in 1934 to Scruse. On further records up until her marriage to Joe Jackson, she was listed as Scruse.) born Kattie B. Screws; May 4, 1930) is the matriarch of the Jackson family of entertainers that includes her children Michael and Janet Jackson. Michael dedicated his sixth studio album Thriller (1982) to her. Janet did the same with her fourth studio album Rhythm Nation 1814 (1989). In 1985, acknowledging the positive impact on her children's successful music careers, Essence magazine honored her as "Mother of the Year".

== Early life ==
Kattie B. Screws was born on May 4, 1930, in Clayton, Alabama, the elder daughter of Martha (née Upshaw; December 14, 1907 – April 30, 1990) and Prince Albert Scruse (né Screws; October 16, 1907 – January 21, 1997). She contracted polio at age two, which left her with a noticeable limp. In 1934, her father changed his surname from Screws to Scruse and renamed her Katherine Esther Scruse.

As a child, Katherine aspired to become an actress or a country singer, but was discouraged by the absence of notable Black country performers. Her parents divorced when she was still a child. She attended Washington High School in East Chicago, Indiana, where she joined the school band and school orchestra.

== Personal life ==
In 1947, Katherine met Joseph "Joe" Jackson, a fellow resident of East Chicago, Indiana, and they began dating after Joe obtained an annulment of his earlier marriage. After a year of courtship, Katherine and Joe married on November 5, 1949. In January 1950, they purchased a house at 2300 Jackson Street in Gary, Indiana for $8,500, which had two bedrooms, a living room, a kitchen, and a small utility room for the washing machine and freezer. Their sons slept in bunk beds in one bedroom, Katherine and Joe in the other, and their daughters in the living room.

From 1950 to 1966, ten children were born to them, including Brandon, the twin of Marlon, who died a few hours after his birth. Their children are:

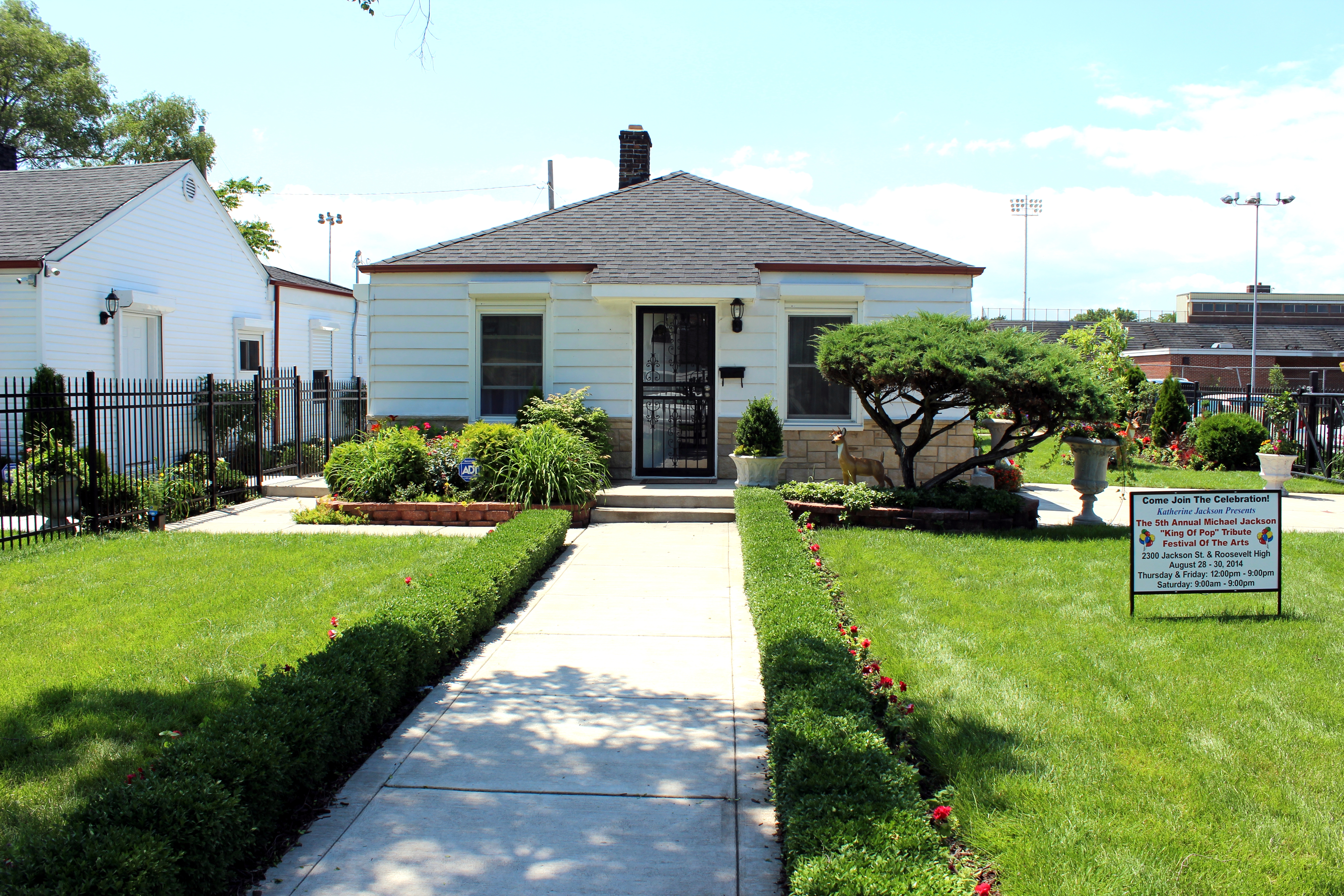
Jackson's family home in Gary, Indiana, pictured in July 2014

- Maureen Reillette "Rebbie" Jackson (born May 29, 1950)
- Sigmund Esco "Jackie" Jackson (born May 4, 1951)
- Tariano Adaryll "Tito" Jackson (October 15, 1953 – September 15, 2024)
- Jermaine La Juane Jackson (born December 11, 1954)
- La Toya Yvonne Jackson (born May 29, 1956)
- Marlon David Jackson (born March 12, 1957)
- Brandon David Jackson (March 12, 1957 – March 12, 1957)
- Michael Joseph Jackson (August 29, 1958 – June 25, 2009)
- Steven Randall "Randy" Jackson (born October 29, 1961)
- Janet Damita Jo Jackson (born May 16, 1966)

Katherine filed for divorce from Joe in March 1973 but later withdrew the petition. In August 1974, Cheryl Terrell gave birth to his daughter, Joh'Vonnie Jackson. Katherine again filed for divorce in 1982, but later withdrew the petition. The couple remained legally married until Joe's death in 2018, and Katherine denied repeated allegations that they were estranged. In 1990, she published her autobiography, My Family, The Jacksons, which chronicled her early life and her relationship with her husband and children; eight of her children contributed salutes in the book's foreword.

In 1980, Katherine and her two youngest children, Randy and Janet, confronted a woman who worked for Joe's company and whom Katherine had reportedly accused of having an affair with him. The incident was dramatized in the 1992 miniseries The Jacksons: An American Dream, where Katherine was depicted confronting Joe rather than the woman. During the late 1980s, she became estranged from her daughter La Toya, who was then managed by her husband Jack Gordon. In her 1991 memoir La Toya: Growing Up in the Jackson Family, La Toya alleged that her mother was emotionally abusive, accusations Katherine denied, attributing them to Gordon's "brainwashing". The two reconciled in 1997 after La Toya filed for divorce from Gordon.

=== Role in the Jackson 5 ===
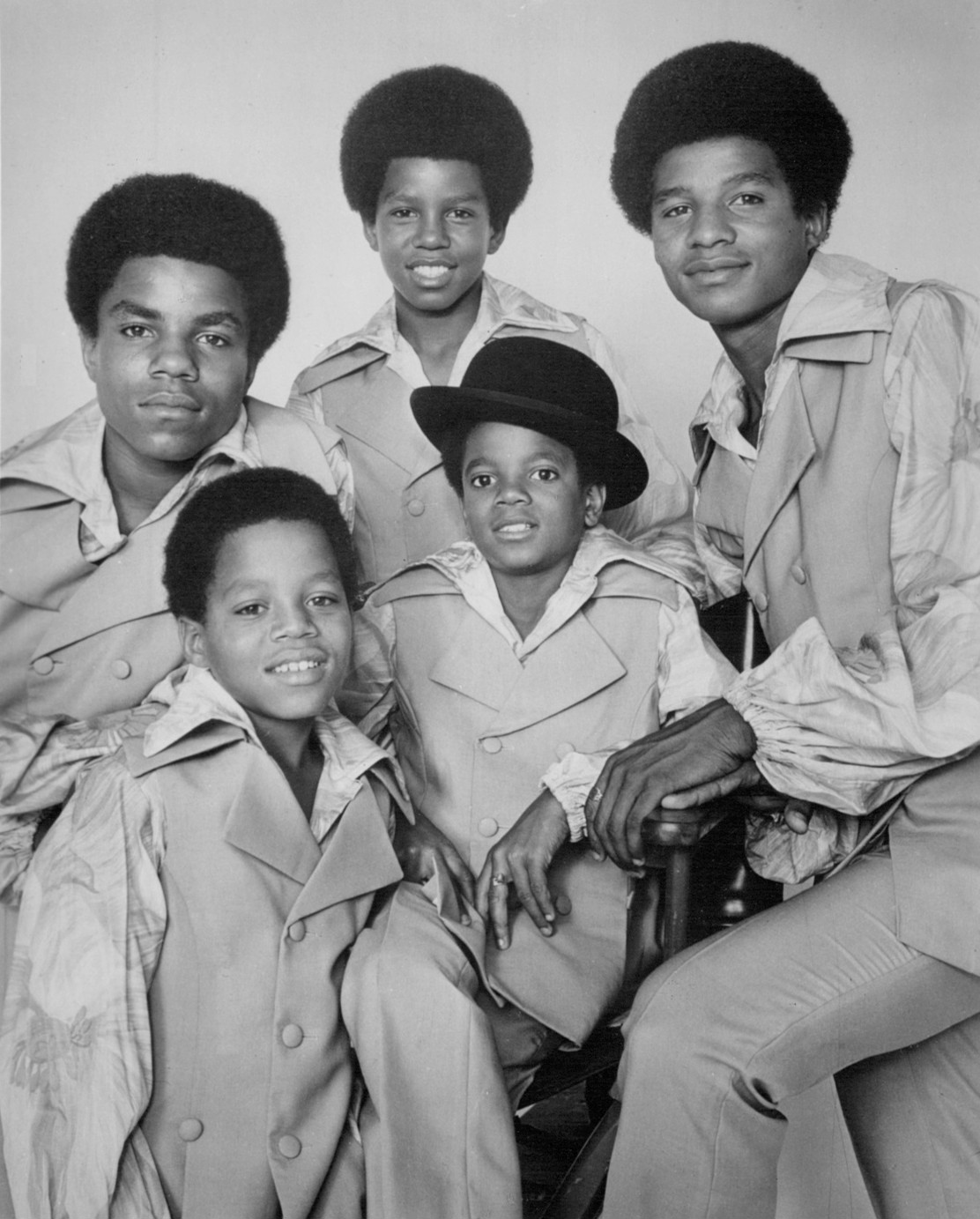
The Jackson 5 in 1969

The Jackson 5 was founded in 1964 in Gary, Indiana. The group included brothers Jackie, Tito, and Jermaine, with younger brothers Marlon and Michael joining soon after. They performed in talent shows and clubs on the Chitlin' Circuit, then signed with Steeltown Records in 1967 and released two singles. The group was managed by their father. In 1968, they left Steeltown Records and signed with Motown and Berry Gordy, becoming the first group to debut with four consecutive number one hits on the Billboard Hot 100 with "I Want You Back", "ABC", "The Love You Save", and "I'll Be There".

During the couple's early years in Gary, Indiana, Katherine sang with Joe while he played guitar. Joe and his brother Luther formed an R&B band, the Falcons, in the mid-1950s to earn extra income. Joe also pursued a boxing career before working as a crane operator at East Chicago's Inland Steel Company to support the family. Katherine, a devout Jehovah's Witness, worked part-time at Sears in Gary and played clarinet, cello, and piano. She recognized Michael's musical ability early on, recalling that she once saw him dancing to the rhythm of their old Maytag washing machine. Another son, Tito, secretly played Joe's guitar when he was not home and eventually broke a string. After the guitar was repaired, Tito played for him, which helped spark the formation of the family group initially called "The Jackson Brothers 5", later renamed the Jackson 5.

While Joe led the rehearsals in the living room, Katherine designed and hand‑sewed the boys' stage outfits and visited The Salvation Army for shoes. She also sang harmonies with her sons around the kitchen table.

== Tributes ==
Michael dedicated his 1982 album Thriller to Katherine. Janet did the same following the release of her 1989 album Rhythm Nation 1814. In 1985, acknowledging her positive influence on her children's successful music careers, the national urban magazine Essence honored her as "Mother of the Year".

In a 2010 interview on The Oprah Winfrey Show, she acknowledged that her husband had admitted to having physically disciplined their children.

== Later life ==
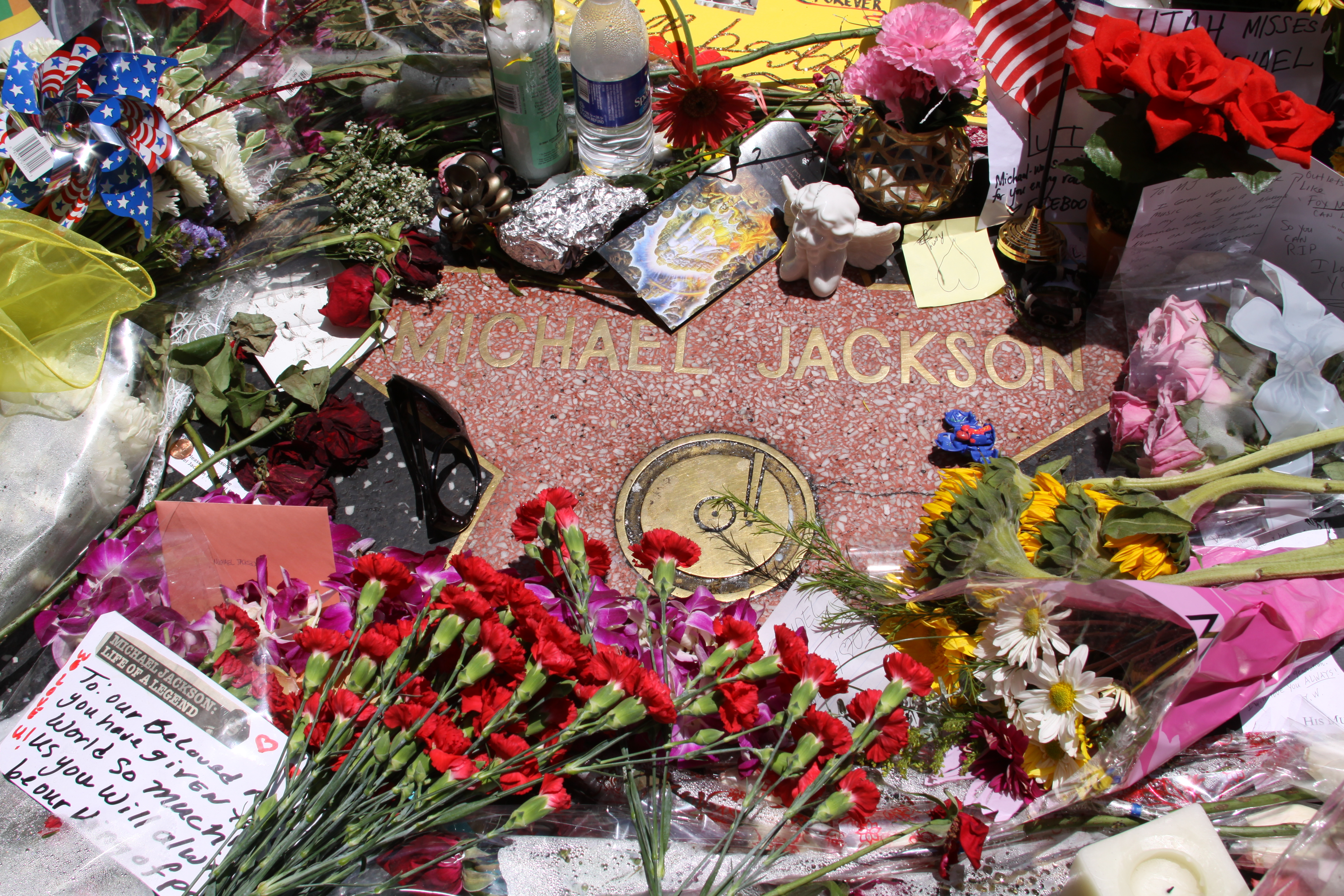
Fans placed flowers and notes on Michael's star on the Hollywood Walk of Fame on the day of his death.

On June 25, 2009, Katherine's son Michael died from an overdose of propofol administered by his personal physician, Conrad Murray. In July 2009, Katherine and Debbie Rowe, the mother of Michael's two oldest children, reached a settlement regarding the care of Rowe's children, Prince and Paris. The agreement provided that the children would be raised by Katherine, while Rowe would have visitation rights and would continue to receive the yearly payments to which Michael had agreed. On August 3, 2009, a judge named Katherine as the children's permanent guardian.

As of 2011, Katherine resided at her home in Calabasas, California, with her grandson TJ Jackson, son of Tito, and his family, having moved out of her Hayvenhurst home in Encino, California, due to renovations. On July 25, 2012, Katherine's guardianship of the children was suspended by the court amid allegations that several Jackson family members might have held her against her will as part of a financial dispute with Michael's estate. Guardianship of the children was temporarily granted to Michael's nephew, TJ. Katherine's guardianship later resumed, with TJ added as a co-guardian.

On November 1, 2017, Katherine resigned co-guardianship of Michael's youngest son, Bigi. She stated that her reasons included her advanced age, the fact that Michael's oldest children were now adults, and Bigi being 15 years old. TJ was, without objection, awarded sole custody.

On September 15, 2024, Katherine's second son Tito died of a heart attack.

== Portrayals ==
On screen, Katherine has been portrayed by:

- Angela Bassett (1992) in The Jacksons: An American Dream (mini-series)
- Patricia Idlette (2004) in Man in the Mirror: The Michael Jackson Story (VH1 biopic)
- Starletta DuPois (2017) in Michael Jackson: Searching for Neverland (television film)
- Nia Long (2026) in Michael (film biopic)
