= Killing Michael Jackson =

2019 documentary film

- Poster
- Based on: Death of Michael Jackson
- Directed by: Sam Eastall
- Starring: Michael Jackson (archival footage); Orlando Martinez; Dan Myers; Scott Smith
- Country of origin: United States; United Kingdom; Germany; Italy
- Original language: English

Production
- Producer: Sam Eastall
- Running time: 60 minutes

Original release
- Release: June 22, 2019 (UK)

Killing Michael Jackson is a 2019 documentary film directed and produced by Sam Eastall, focusing on the death of singer Michael Jackson. The documentary features Orlando Martinez, Dan Myers and Scott Smith – three detectives who were involved in the initial investigation of Jackson's death.

== Synopsis ==
On June 25, 2009, American singer Michael Jackson died of acute propofol and benzodiazepine intoxication at his home on North Carolwood Drive in the Holmby Hills. His personal physician, Conrad Murray, said he found Jackson in his room, not breathing and with a weak pulse, and administered CPR on Jackson to no avail.

On August 28, 2009, the Los Angeles County Coroner ruled that Jackson's death was a homicide. Shortly before his death, Jackson had reportedly been administered propofol and two anti-anxiety benzodiazepines, lorazepam and midazolam, in his home. Law enforcement officials charged Murray with involuntary manslaughter on November 7, 2011 and he served two years of his four-year prison sentence, with early release for good behavior.

The documentary debuted in North America on September 7, 2020, on Bounce TV.

== See also ==
- Death of Michael Jackson
