= Death of Michael Jackson =

2009 death of American singer

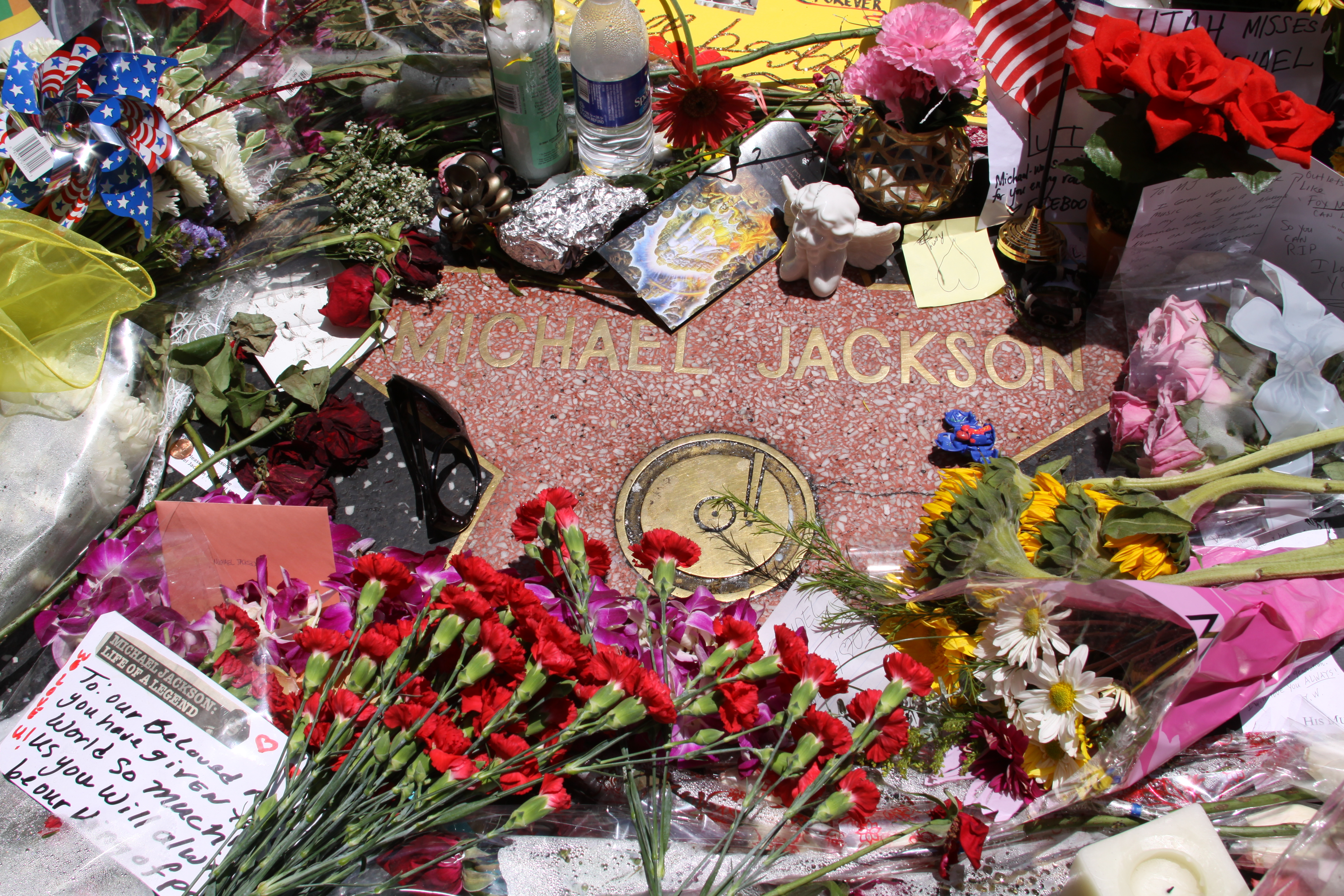
- Jackson's star on the Hollywood Walk of Fame became a focal point for fans, surrounded by barriers and covered with flowers.
- Date: June 25, 2009; 17 years ago
- Time: 2:26 p.m. (Pacific Daylight Time)
- Location: Westwood, Los Angeles, California, US
- Type: Accidental homicide by acute propofol intoxication
- Cause: Medical malpractice
- Deaths: Michael Jackson
- Coroner: Los Angeles County Department of Medical Examiner
- Convicted: Conrad Robert Murray
- Trial: People v. Murray
- Verdict: Guilty
- Convictions: Involuntary manslaughter
- Sentence: 4 years in prison (paroled after 1 year and 11 months)

On June 25, 2009, American singer Michael Jackson died of acute propofol intoxication in Los Angeles, California, at the age of 50. His personal physician, Conrad Murray, said that he found Jackson in his bedroom at his North Carolwood Drive home in the Holmby Hills area of the city not breathing and with a weak pulse; he administered cardiopulmonary resuscitation (CPR) to no avail, and security called 911 at 12:21 p.m. Pacific Daylight Time (UTC–7). Paramedics treated Jackson at the scene, but he was pronounced dead at Ronald Reagan UCLA Medical Center in Westwood at 2:26 p.m.

On August 28, 2009, the Los Angeles County Department of Medical Examiner concluded that Jackson's death was a homicide. Jackson had been administered propofol and anti-anxiety benzodiazepines lorazepam and midazolam by his doctor. Murray was convicted of involuntary manslaughter in November 2011, and was released in October 2013 after serving two years of his four-year prison sentence with time off for good behavior.

At the time of his death, Jackson had been preparing for a series of comeback concerts, This Is It, that were due to begin in July 2009 in London, England. Following his death, there were unprecedented surges of Internet traffic and a spike in sales of his music. A televised memorial service, held at the Staples Center in Los Angeles, had an estimated 2.5 billion viewers. In 2010, Sony Music Entertainment signed a US$250 million deal with Jackson's estate to retain distribution rights to his recordings until 2017 and to release seven posthumous albums of unreleased material over the following decade, although only two were ever released.

== Background ==
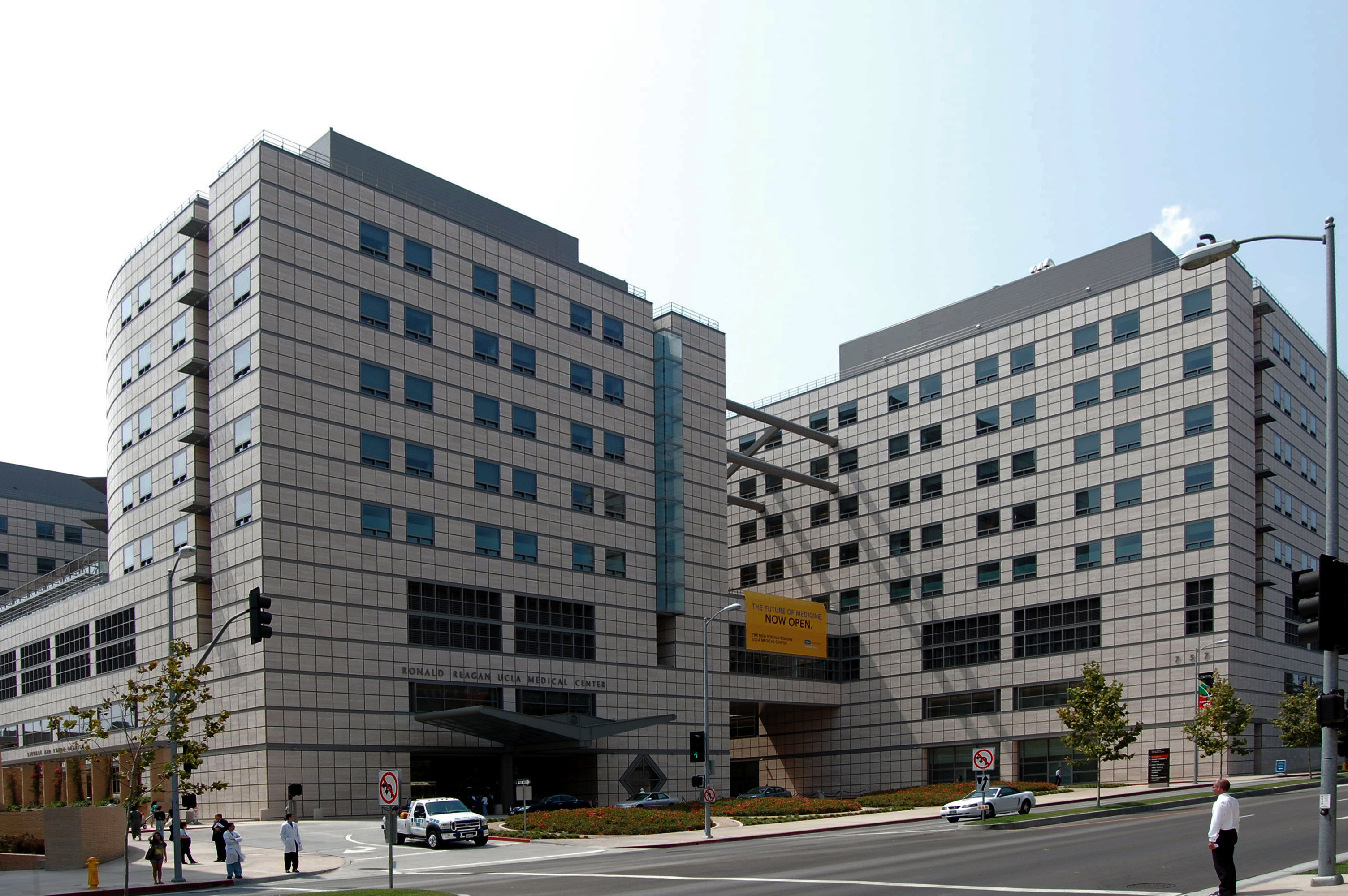
Jackson was taken by ambulance to Ronald Reagan UCLA Medical Center on June 25 where he arrived at 1:14 p.m. and was pronounced dead at 2:26 p.m.

At the time of his death, Jackson was preparing for a series of comeback concerts, This Is It, scheduled to begin in July 2009 at the O2 Arena in London. On June 24, Jackson arrived for rehearsal at the Staples Center in Los Angeles at around 6:30 p.m. According to the magician Ed Alonzo, Jackson jokingly complained of laryngitis and did not rehearse until 9 p.m. Alonzo said that "he looked great and had great energy." The rehearsal continued past midnight.

Jackson returned to his home at 100 North Carolwood Drive in the Holmby Hills neighborhood at around 1:00 a.m. the following morning and went to bed approximately half an hour later. He had long suffered from insomnia and had a history of using drugs in an attempt to sleep. His personal physician, Conrad Murray, was present to help him sleep and administered various drugs including diazepam, lorazepam, and midazolam while monitoring him by his bedside. After several hours and multiple drug injections, Jackson remained unable to fall asleep and, according to Murray, repeatedly asked for "milk", a nickname for the surgical anesthetic propofol, which he had previously used as a sleep aid. At 10:40 a.m., with Jackson still awake, Murray relented and injected 25 milligrams of propofol diluted with lidocaine. Once Jackson was asleep, Murray testified that he left the bedside to use the bathroom. He returned two minutes later to find Jackson not breathing and with a weak pulse.

Murray testified that he attempted to revive Jackson for about 10 minutes by performing cardiopulmonary resuscitation (CPR) and administering flumazenil, a drug used to counteract sedative overdose, before calling for help from staff in the house. Statements described Murray using a non-standard CPR technique. The recording of the emergency call, released on June 26, one day after Jackson's death, described Murray performing CPR on a bed, not on a hard surface such as a floor which would be both standard practice and more effective. Murray said he placed one hand underneath Jackson and used the other for chest compressions, whereas standard practice is to use both hands for compression. Murray did not call 911; he said he was hindered by the absence of a landline in the house and by not knowing the exact address. It was later discovered that during the hour after finding Jackson not breathing, Murray made several private calls on his cell phone that he did not disclose to law enforcement. A security guard eventually called 911 at 12:21 p.m., nearly an hour and a half after Jackson was first found unresponsive. Paramedics arrived at 12:26 p.m. and found that Jackson was not breathing and had no pulse.

Paramedics performed CPR for 42 minutes at the house. Murray's attorney stated that Jackson had a pulse when he was taken from the house and placed in the ambulance. A Los Angeles Fire Department (LAFD) official gave a different account, stating that paramedics found Jackson in "full cardiac arrest" and that they observed no change in his condition en route to the hospital. Jackson was transported to Ronald Reagan UCLA Medical Center. The ambulance arrived at approximately 1:14 p.m., and a team of medical personnel attempted to resuscitate him for more than an hour. Their efforts were unsuccessful, and Jackson was pronounced dead at 2:26 p.m. at the age of 50. (Note: Attributed to multiple references:)

== Investigation ==
=== Autopsies ===
Jackson's body was flown by helicopter to the Los Angeles County Coroner's offices in Lincoln Heights, where a three-hour autopsy was performed the next day (June 26) by the chief medical examiner, Lakshmanan Sathyavagiswaran. The Jackson family arranged for a private second autopsy, a practice that could yield expedited, though limited, results. After the preliminary autopsy was completed, Craig Harvey, chief investigator for the coroner's office, said that there was no evidence of trauma or foul play.

On August 28, 2009, the Los Angeles County coroner classified Jackson's death as a homicide, determining that he died from acute propofol intoxication, exacerbated by the anxiolytic lorazepam and, to a lesser extent, midazolam, diazepam, lidocaine, and ephedrine. The coroner kept the complete toxicology report private at the request of the police and district attorney.

The autopsy report stated that Jackson was otherwise healthy for his age and that his heart was strong; his most significant health issue was chronic inflammation of the lungs, though this did not contribute to his death. His other major organs were normal, and he had no atherosclerosis except for slight plaque accumulation in the arteries of his leg. The Associated Press reported that he weighed 136 pounds (62 kg) at the time of his death.

=== Law enforcement agencies ===
Jackson's death was investigated by the Los Angeles Police Department (LAPD) and the Drug Enforcement Administration (DEA); the latter agency had the authority to investigate matters otherwise protected by doctor–patient confidentiality, allowing it to trace the complex trail of prescription drugs supplied to Jackson.

On August 28, 2009, the LAPD announced that the case would be referred to prosecutors. Because the LAPD did not secure Jackson's home and allowed the Jackson family access to it before returning to remove certain items, some observers raised concerns that the chain of custody had been broken. The police maintained that they had followed protocol. California Attorney General Jerry Brown announced that his office was helping the LAPD and DEA in creating a statewide database of all medical doctors and prescriptions filled.

The LAPD subpoenaed medical records from doctors who had treated Jackson. Police considered, but did not bring, homicide charges against those who had supplied drugs to him.

=== Drug use allegations ===
Marc Schaffel, Jackson's former video producer, said that the singer had used propofol, alprazolam and sertraline. Other drugs included omeprazole, hydrocodone, paroxetine, carisoprodol, and hydromorphone. After his death, police found several drugs in his home, including propofol. Some of the drugs had labels made out to fraudulent names, and others were unlabeled. A 2004 police document prepared for the 2005 People v. Jackson trial stated that Jackson was taking up to 40 alprazolam pills a night. Alprazolam was not found in his bloodstream at the time of death. Jackson's friend A. J. Farshchian said that Jackson was scared of drugs.

Eugene Aksenoff, a Tokyo-based physician who had treated Jackson and his children on several occasions, expressed concern about Jackson's use of various drugs. He said that Jackson asked for stimulants to help him get through demanding performances, but Aksenoff refused to prescribe them. He recalled that Jackson had chronic fatigue, fever, insomnia, and other symptoms, and that he took a large number of drugs. He suspected that one of the major factors causing these symptoms was excessive use of steroids or other skin-whitening medications.

Jackson's sister Janet Jackson said that the family tried to stage an intervention in early 2007 when Michael was living in Las Vegas. She and some of their brothers allegedly traveled to his home but were turned away by security guards who had been instructed not to let them enter. He was also rumored to have refused phone calls from his mother. However, the family denied that they had attempted an intervention.

==== Propofol ====
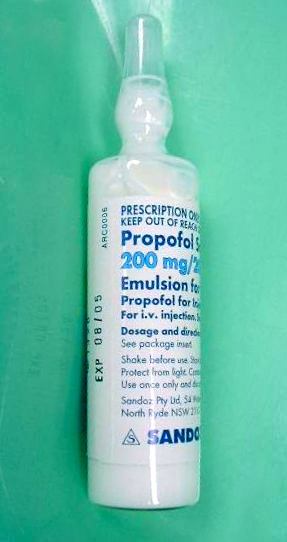
An ampoule of propofol

Of all the drugs found in Jackson's home, the one that most concerned investigators was propofol (Diprivan), a powerful anesthetic administered intravenously in hospitals to induce and maintain anesthesia during surgery. Nicknamed "milk of amnesia" because of its opaque, milk-like appearance (and a play on "milk of magnesia"), the drug has been associated with cardiac arrest, but it still may be increasingly used off-label for anxiolytic and other medically unsubstantiated purposes. Several propofol bottles—both opened and unopened—were found in his home.

On June 30, Cherilyn Lee, a nurse practitioner who had worked as Jackson's nutritionist, said that he had asked her in May to provide propofol to help him sleep, but she refused. He told her that he had been given the drug before for persistent insomnia and that a doctor had said it was safe as long as he was being monitored. Lee said she received a telephone call from an aide to Jackson on June 21 reporting that Jackson was ill, although she no longer worked for him. She overheard Jackson complain that one side of his body was hot and the other cold. Lee advised the aide to send Jackson to a hospital, and believed she recognized the symptoms, suspecting that Jackson was on propofol.

Arnold Klein said that Jackson used an anesthesiologist to administer propofol to help him sleep while he was on tour in Germany. The anesthesiologist would "take him down" at night and "bring him back up" in the morning during the HIStory World Tour of 1996 and 1997.

=== Medical professionals ===
The DEA focused on at least five doctors who prescribed drugs to Jackson, trying to determine whether they had had a "face to face" relationship with him and whether they had made legally required diagnoses. At least nine doctors were under investigation. Police sought to question 30 doctors, nurses, and pharmacists, including Arnold Klein. Klein said that he had occasionally given Jackson pethidine to sedate him, but had administered nothing stronger and had turned his records over to the medical examiner.

==== Personal physician ====
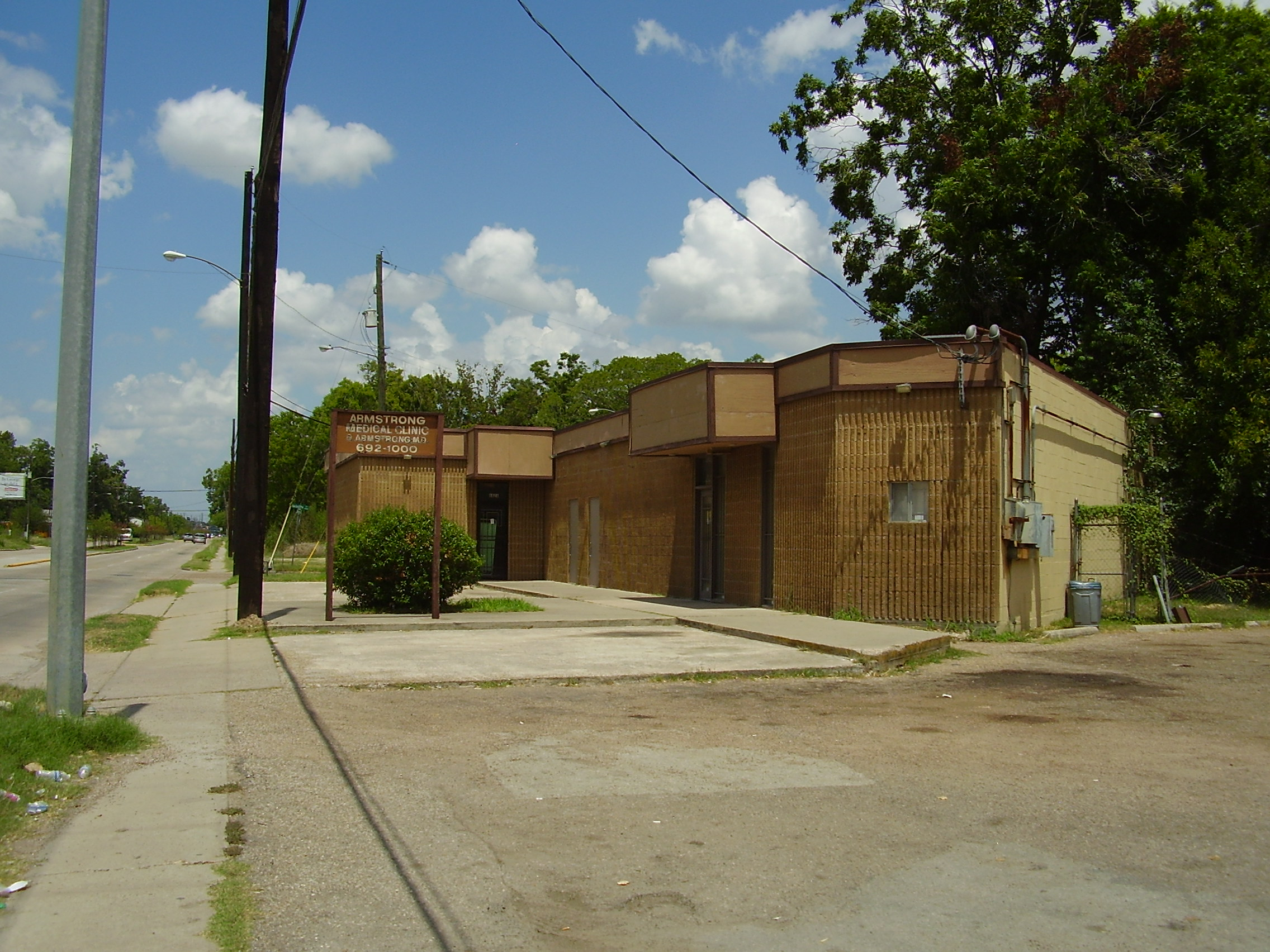
Murray practiced out of the Armstrong Clinic in Houston. The clinic was raided during an investigation of Murray in July 2009.

Cardiologist Conrad Murray joined Jackson's camp in May 2009 as part of Jackson's agreement with AEG Live, the promoter of his London concerts. Murray first met Jackson in 2006 in Las Vegas when he treated one of Jackson's children. AEG Live said that Jackson insisted the company hire Murray to accompany him to England. During Murray's trial, it emerged that AEG employed Murray and that Jackson did not sign the contract for that employment.

Murray said through his attorney that he did not prescribe or administer pethidine or oxycodone to Jackson, but did not say what, if anything, he did prescribe or administer. Los Angeles police said that Murray spoke to officers immediately after Jackson's death and during an extensive interview two days later. They stressed they found "no red flag" and did not suspect foul play. On June 26, police towed away a car used by Murray, stating that it might contain medication or other evidence. The police released the car five days later.

Jesse Jackson, a friend of the Jackson family, said that the family was concerned about Murray's role. "They have good reason to be ... he left the scene." Over the next few weeks, law enforcement grew increasingly concerned about Murray. On July 22, detectives searched Murray's medical office and storage unit in Houston, removing items such as a computer, two hard drives, contact lists, and a hospital suspension notice. On July 27, an anonymous source reported that Murray had administered propofol within 24 hours of Jackson's death. Investigators searched Murray's home and office in Las Vegas, as well as a Las Vegas pharmacy. Jackson paid Murray $150,000 (equivalent to about $225,000 in 2025) per month.

On February 8, 2010, Murray was charged with involuntary manslaughter by Los Angeles prosecutors. He pleaded not guilty and was released after posting $75,000 bail. Shortly thereafter, the California Medical Board issued an order preventing Murray from administering heavy sedatives.

On January 11, 2011, the judge at Murray's preliminary hearing determined that he should stand trial for involuntary manslaughter in the Jackson case. The judge also suspended Murray's license to practice medicine in California.

After several delays, the jury trial began on September 27, 2011. On November 7, 2011, Murray was found guilty of involuntary manslaughter and was held without bail to await sentencing. On November 29, 2011, he received the maximum sentence of four years in prison. Murray was released on October 28, 2013, due to California prison overcrowding and good behavior.

== Health ==
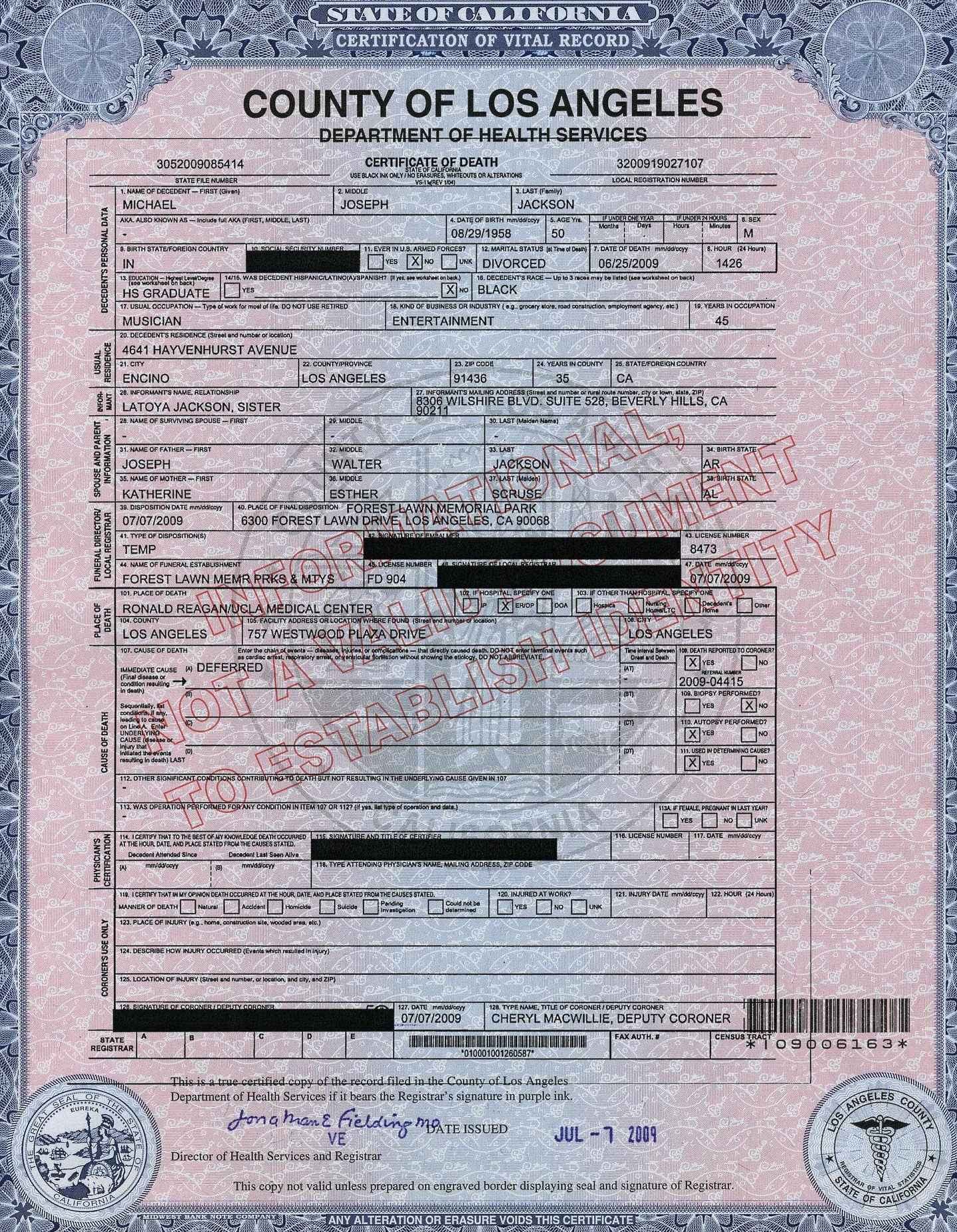
Michael Jackson's initial death certificate, issued pending toxicology reports

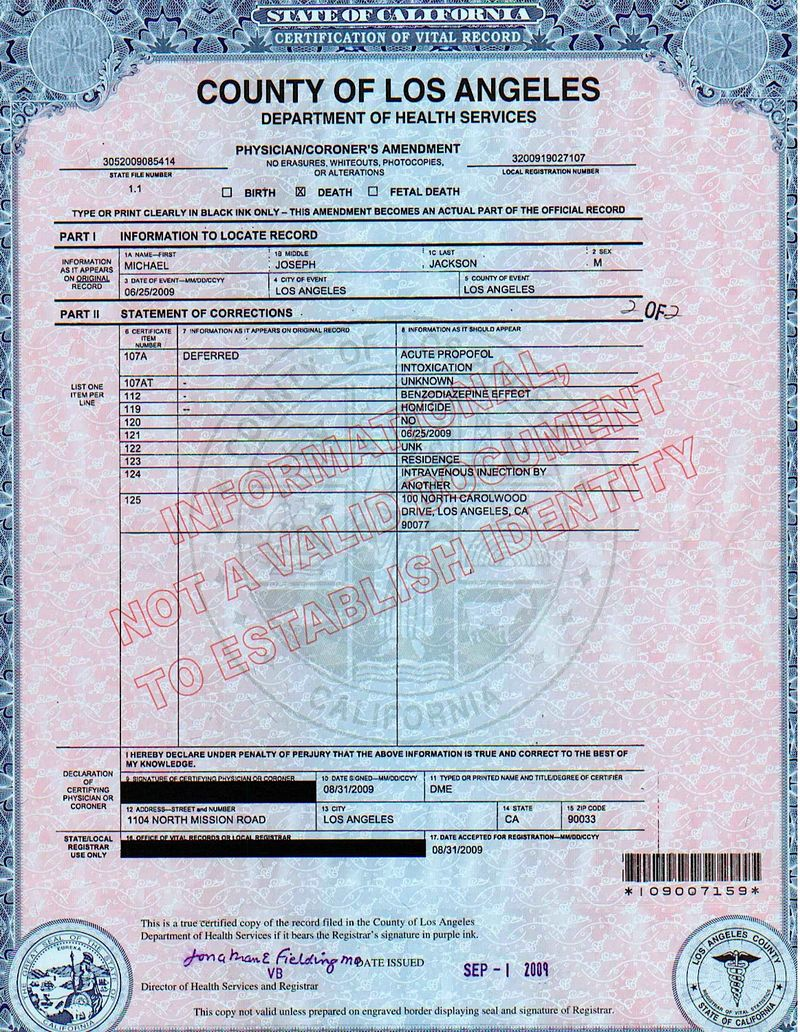
The amendment form issued by the coroner for his death certificate, after toxicology reports became available. The cause is changed from "deferred" to "acute propofol intoxication" and the ruling of "Homicide" is added.

Stacy Brown, a biographer, said that Jackson had become "very frail, totally, totally underweight", and that his family had been worried about him. Another biographer, J. Randy Taraborrelli, said that Jackson had been addicted to painkillers periodically for decades. Arnold Klein, Jackson's dermatologist, stated that Jackson misused prescription drugs and that he had diagnosed him with vitiligo and lupus. However, Klein said that when he saw Jackson at his office three days before his death, he "was in very good physical condition. He was dancing for my patients. He was very mentally aware when we saw him and he was in a very good mood."

== Reactions ==
=== Family ===
The Jackson family released a statement following his death:

Our beloved son, brother, uncle and father of three children has gone so unexpectedly, in such a tragic way and much too soon. It leaves us, his family, speechless and devastated to a point, where communication with the outside world seems almost impossible at times.

La Toya Jackson believed that her brother "was murdered for his music catalogue". Shortly after Jackson's death, his family raised questions about the role of AEG Live, the This Is It concert promoter, in the final weeks of his life. Joe Jackson, filed a complaint with the California Medical Board alleging that AEG Live was illegally practicing medicine by demanding that Murray get Jackson off various medications. The complaint also alleged that AEG Live failed to provide the resuscitation equipment and nurse that Murray had requested. AEG spokesman Michael Roth declined to comment.

After Murray pleaded not guilty to the manslaughter charge, several members of the Jackson family said that they felt he deserved a more severe charge. On June 25, 2010, Joe filed a wrongful death lawsuit against Murray. The lawsuit alleged that Murray repeatedly lied to cover up his use of propofol, failed to keep sufficient medical records, and was negligent in his use of medications on Jackson. Murray's civil attorney, Charles Peckham, denied that Murray gave Jackson anything life-threatening. On August 15, 2012, Joe dropped the wrongful death lawsuit.

The Jackson family praised the guilty verdict against Murray. In 2017, Michael's daughter Paris Jackson said that she was "absolutely" convinced that her father had been murdered. As of 2023, Murray has returned to Trinidad and Tobago to practice medicine.

In 2010, Jackson's three children and his mother, Katherine, sued Jackson's concert promoter Anschutz Entertainment Group, Inc. (AEG) and its subsidiaries and principals, alleging that AEG had negligently hired Murray. In 2013, following a 21-week trial in Los Angeles, the jury returned a verdict in AEG's favor, finding that AEG had no reason to know that Murray would be "unfit or incompetent to perform the work for which he was hired" and therefore was not negligent.

=== Estate ===
Jackson's last will was filed by attorney John Branca at the Los Angeles County courthouse on July 1, 2009. Signed July 7, 2002, it named Branca and accountant John McClain as executors; they were confirmed as such by a Los Angeles judge on July 6, 2009. All assets were given to the (pre-existing) Michael Jackson Family Trust (amended March 22, 2002), the details of which were not made public. The Associated Press reported that, in 2007, Jackson had a net worth of $236.6 million: $567.6 million in assets, including Neverland Ranch and his 50% share of the Sony/ATV Music Publishing' catalog, and debts of $331 million. The guardianship of his three children was given to his mother, Katherine, or, if she was unable or unwilling, to singer Diana Ross. Jackson's will allocated 20% of his fortune, as well as 20% of money earned after his death, to unspecified charities.

Media reports suggested that the settlement of Jackson's estate could take many years. The value of Sony/ATV Music Publishing was estimated by Ryan Schinman, chief of Platinum Rye, at $1.5 billion. Schinman's estimate placed Jackson's share at $750 million, from which Jackson would have had an annual income of $80 million. In September 2016, a deal was finalized for Sony's acquisition of Jackson's share of Sony/ATV from the Jackson estate for $750 million.

=== Media coverage and internet activity ===
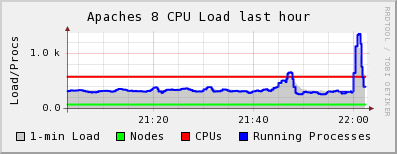
Wikipedia spikes at 15:00 hrs in Los Angeles, June 25.

Jackson's death was first reported by the Los Angeles-based celebrity news website TMZ. Doctors at Ronald Reagan UCLA Medical Center pronounced Jackson dead at 2:26 p.m., and TMZ announced the death 18 minutes later. The Los Angeles Times confirmed the report at 2:51 p.m. PDT (5:51 p.m. EDT). The news spread rapidly online, causing websites to slow down or crash from user overload. TMZ and the Los Angeles Times experienced outages. Google initially believed that the surge in search requests indicated a DDoS attack and blocked searches related to Jackson for 30 minutes. Twitter reported a crash, as did Wikipedia at 3:15 p.m. PDT (22:15 UTC). The Wikimedia Foundation reported nearly a million visitors to Jackson's biography within one hour, likely the highest number of visitors to any article in a one‑hour period in Wikipedia's history up to that point. AOL Instant Messenger collapsed for 40 minutes. Around 15 percent of Twitter posts (5,000 tweets per minute) mentioned Jackson after the news broke, compared with the 5 percent that had mentioned the Iranian elections or the flu pandemic earlier in the year. Overall, web traffic ranged from 11 percent to at least 20 percent above normal levels. MTV and BET aired marathons of Jackson's music videos.

Television stations around the world aired specials about Jackson. The British soap opera EastEnders added a last-minute scene to the June 26 episode in which the character Denise Johnson discussed the news with Patrick Trueman. Magazines including Time published commemorative editions. A scene featuring Jackson's sister La Toya was removed from the film Brüno out of respect for the family.

According to an analysis released by the Global Language Monitor (GLM), 72 hours after his death, Jackson became the ninth-most-covered news item in global print and electronic media. For the Internet and social media, he ranked second, behind the election of President Barack Obama. Commentators discussed Jackson's work and described his "profoundly tragic figure". Le Figaro columnist Yann Moix wrote that although Jackson, like his moonwalk dance move, lived life in reverse, the world at his death shed "identical and universal tears".

A Pew Research Center survey found that two-thirds of Americans believed the coverage of Jackson's death was excessive, while 3 percent felt it was insufficient. In the UK, the BBC received more than 700 complaints from viewers who felt the news had been dominated by coverage of his death. On June 29, American conservative commentator Rush Limbaugh said the coverage was a "horrible disgrace" and expressed support for activist-ministers Jesse Jackson and Al Sharpton, who were attempting to stem speculation about the cause of death. Other conservatives, including commentator Bill O'Reilly and Congressman Peter T. King, also criticized the level of media attention. Venezuelan President Hugo Chávez called Jackson's death "lamentable news", but criticized CNN for covering it more heavily than the Honduran coup d'état.

In 2009, Jackson's family hired the social media marketing company uSocial.net to increase the number of followers on Jackson's Twitter profile. According to the New York Daily News, uSocial was contracted to deliver 25,000 followers.

=== Grief ===
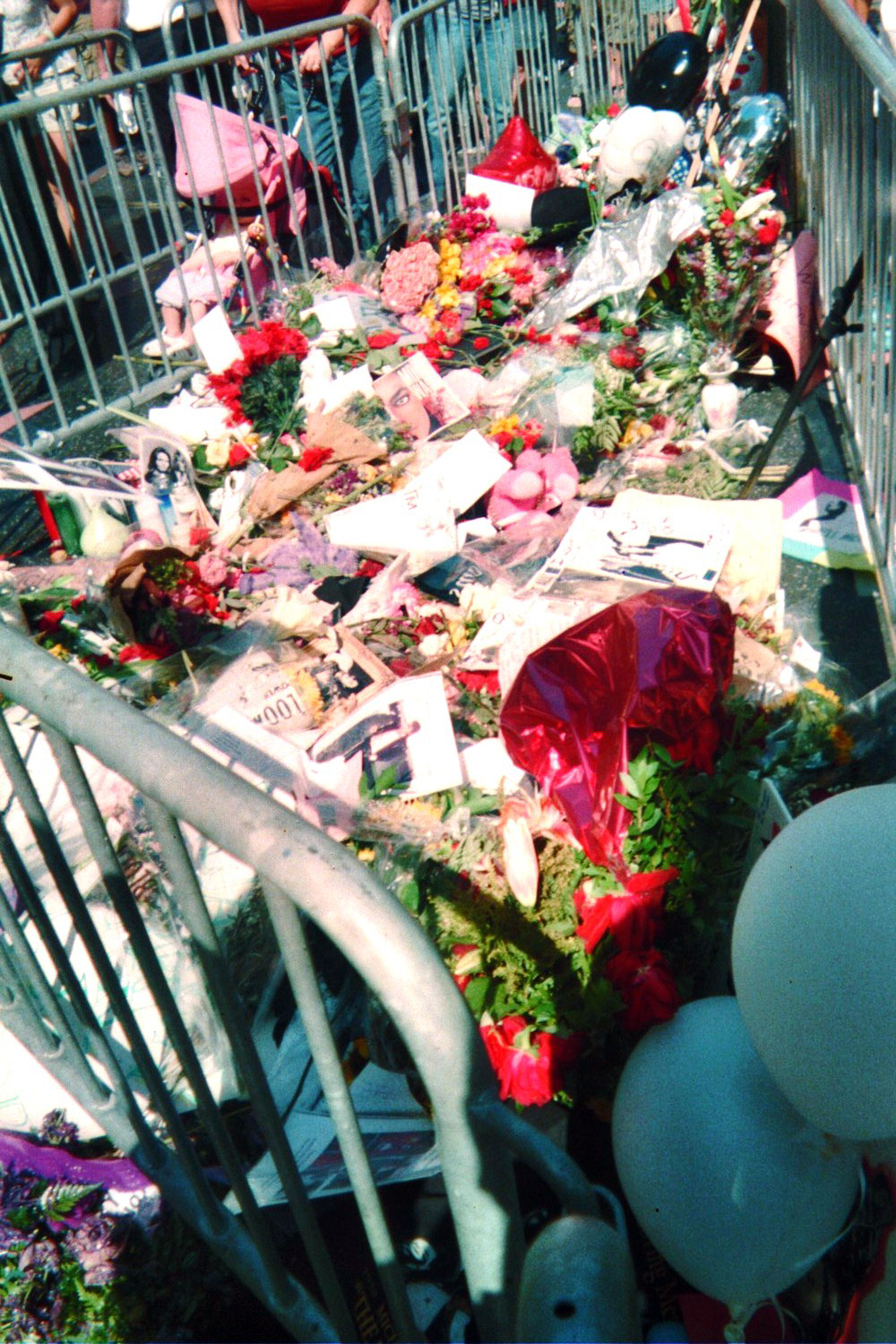
Jackson's star on the Hollywood Walk of Fame became a focal point for public grief.

News of Jackson's death triggered an outpouring of grief around the world. Fans gathered outside the UCLA Medical Center, Neverland Ranch, his Holmby Hills home, the Hayvenhurst family home in Encino, the Apollo Theater in New York, and at Hitsville U.S.A., the former Motown headquarters in Detroit where Jackson's career began, now the Motown Museum. Streets around the hospital were blocked off. A small crowd, including the city's mayor, gathered outside Jackson's childhood home in Gary, where the flag on city hall was flown at half-staff in his honor. Fans in Hollywood initially gathered around the Walk of Fame star belonging to radio host Michael Jackson, as the singer's star had been temporarily covered by equipment for the Brüno film premiere. Grieving fans and memorial tributes were relocated from the talk radio host's star the following day.

From Odessa to Brussels, and beyond, fans held their own memorial gatherings. US President Barack Obama sent a letter of condolence to the Jackson family, and the House of Representatives observed a moment of silence. Obama later said that Jackson "will go down in history as one of our greatest entertainers". Former South African President Nelson Mandela said that Jackson's loss would be felt worldwide.

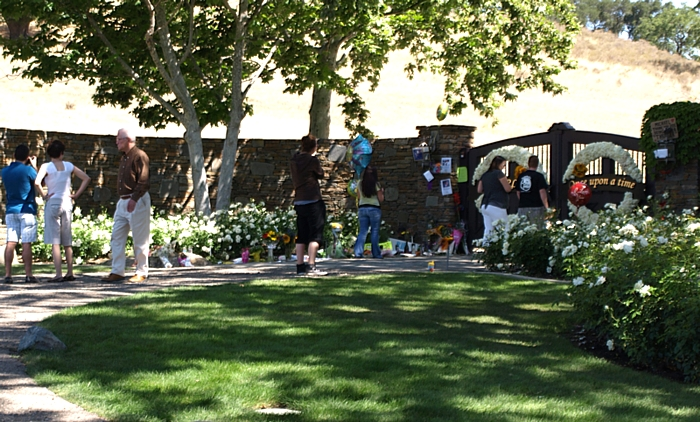
Fans visiting the makeshift memorial set up outside the Neverland Ranch entrance shortly after Jackson's death

In Japan, Internal Affairs and Communications Minister Tsutomu Sato told reporters, "I feel sad as I had watched him since he was a member of Jackson Five [sic]." Defense Minister Yasukazu Hamada credited Jackson with building a generation with his music. Health Minister Yōichi Masuzoe called the death an "extremely tragic loss".

In South Korea, former President Kim Dae-jung said, "We lost a hero of the world."

In the United Kingdom, a spokesperson for Prime Minister Gordon Brown said: "This is very sad news for the millions of Michael Jackson fans in Britain and around the world." Conservative opposition leader David Cameron said: "I know Michael Jackson's fans in Britain and around the world will be sad today. Despite the controversies, he was a legendary entertainer."

Russian fans gathered outside the US Embassy in Moscow to mourn. French Minister of Culture Frédéric Mitterrand said, "We all have a Michael Jackson within." Brazilian musician and former Culture Minister Gilberto Gil said, "It makes me very sad to see such a great and incredible talent leave us so soon."

Numerous celebrities reacted to Jackson's death. Elizabeth Taylor, a long-time friend, said that she could not imagine life without him. Liza Minnelli told CBS, "When the autopsy comes, all hell's going to break loose, so thank God we're celebrating him now." His sister La Toya said that Jackson's daughter told her he had been overworked. La Toya said: "She said, 'No, you don't understand. They kept working him and Daddy didn't want that, but they worked him constantly'. I felt so bad."

=== Tributes ===
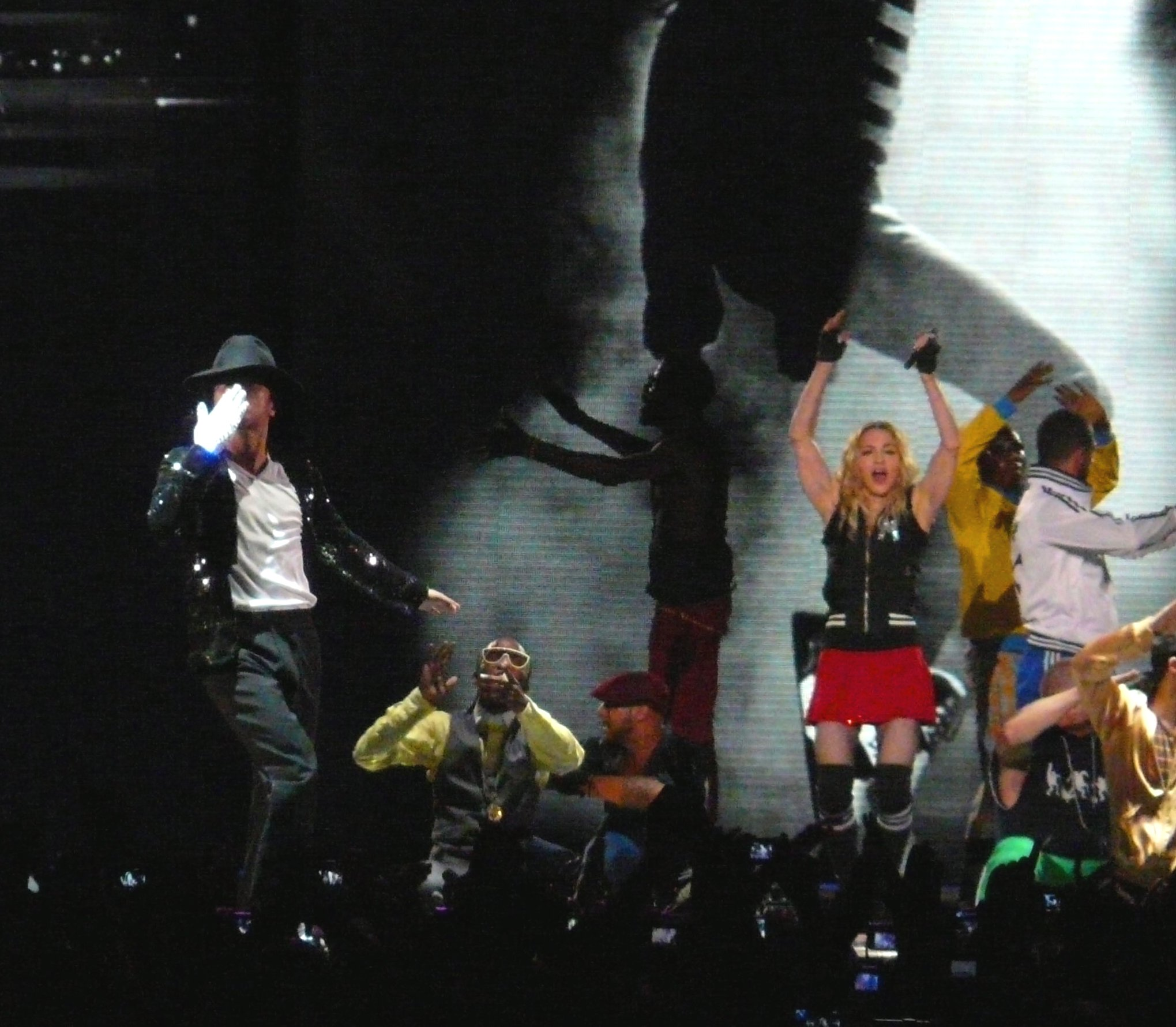
During the second leg of Madonna's Sticky & Sweet Tour in July 2009, she and a Jackson impersonator performed a medley of Jackson's songs while photos of Jackson's were shown on a screen behind them.

==== Local ====
On June 30, 2009, U2 while performing their first show of the U2 360 tour in Barcelona dedicated the song "Angel of Harlem" to Jackson. U2 vocalist Bono sang verses from "Man in the Mirror" and "Don't Stop 'Til You Get Enough" at the end of the song. On July 10, 2009, six thousand fans attended a musical tribute in Jackson's hometown of Gary, Indiana. Local performers staged a medley of his songs, and mayor Rudolph M. Clay unveiled a seven-foot memorial to him. Jesse Jackson addressed the crowd, stating, "This is where Michael learned to dance, where he learned to sing, where he learned to sacrifice." The day after Jackson's death, rapper The Game released a tribute song, "Better on the Other Side", produced by DJ Khalil and featuring vocals by Diddy, Chris Brown, Polow da Don, Mario Winans, Usher, and Boyz II Men. A variety of other artists recorded tributes, including 50 Cent, LL Cool J, Robbie Williams, Akon, Ariana Grande and guitarist Buckethead.

On June 26, artists including Pharrell Williams and Lily Allen paid tribute to Jackson at the UK Glastonbury Festival. Allen wore a single white glove (a signature look for Jackson), while the Streets performed a cover of "Billie Jean". Tributes to Jackson at the festival continued over the weekend. On July 5, 2009, Madonna performed a medley of Jackson's songs during her Sticky & Sweet Tour, while a Jackson impersonator performed Jackson's signature dances and photos of Jackson were displayed behind them.

Metal and hard rock acts who performed Jackson songs in tribute include Metallica, Chris Cornell, Steve Vai and Andy Timmons, Extreme, and CKY. Buckethead wrote a song entitled "The Homing Beacon", inspired by Jackson's film Captain EO. Statements of tribute came from rock musicians including Judas Priest bassist Ian Hill, Queen guitarist Brian May, members of Black Sabbath, former Skid Row frontman Sebastian Bach, Alice Cooper, Geoff Tate of Queensrÿche, Eddie Van Halen (who worked with Jackson during the recording of Thriller) and Slash (who played guitar on Jackson's single "Give In to Me"). In October 2013, a tribute album was released featuring current and former members of Iron Maiden, Kiss, Motörhead, Testament, Guns N' Roses, Fozzy, Quiet Riot, Dio, Whitesnake, and Mr. Big, among others.

Jackson's sister La Toya released her song "Home" on July 28 as a charity single in her brother's honor. All proceeds were donated to one of Michael's favorite charities. BET's annual awards show aired three days after Jackson's death, on June 28, 2009, and included a tribute to him. Host Jamie Foxx said, "We want to celebrate this black man. He belongs to us and we shared him with everybody else." The ceremony featured performances of several of Jackson's songs, including pieces from his time with The Jackson Five and those from his solo career. Joe Jackson and Al Sharpton were in the audience, and Janet Jackson spoke briefly on behalf of the family. The show was the most-watched in the awards shows history.

==== International ====
The day after Jackson's death, the mayor of Rio de Janeiro announced that the city would erect a statue of him in the favela of Dona Marta. Jackson had visited the community in 1996 and filmed a music video for "They Don't Care About Us" there. The mayor said that Jackson had helped make the community into "a model for social development". Memorials were held in Tokyo, Japan, Bucharest, Romania, and Baku, Azerbaijan. In Midyat, Turkey, a Salat al-Janazah (Islamic funeral prayer) was performed, and traditional funeral helva distributed. Fans gathered at the Eiffel Tower on June 28 to pay homage to Jackson.

The music video for "Do the Bartman", a Simpsons song co-written by Jackson, was broadcast ahead of an episode rerun of The Simpsons on June 28. It featured a title card paying tribute to Jackson. The 1991 Simpsons episode "Stark Raving Dad", which Jackson guest-starred in, was broadcast on Fox on July 5. The episode had been broadcast on the Dutch Comedy Central the day after his death and was dedicated to Jackson's memory. His 1978 film The Wiz (in which he co-starred alongside Diana Ross and Richard Pryor) was briefly re-released in a rare 35mm format and was shown at the Hollywood Theater in his honor. It was also re-released a week prior to the release of Michael Jackson's This Is It in select cities. Madonna opened the 2009 MTV Video Music Awards with a speech about Michael Jackson. Janet Jackson made an appearance at the VMAs to pay a musical tribute to her brother and honor his career. He was honored with a posthumous lifetime achievement award during the 52nd Annual Grammy Awards on January 31, 2010. Jackson was featured in the 82nd annual Academy Awards ceremony's "In Memoriam" tribute.

=== Record sales ===
Jackson's record sales increased eighty-fold by June 29, according to HMV. Bill Carr of Amazon said the website sold out of all Jackson and Jackson 5 CDs within minutes of the news breaking, and that demand surpassed that for Elvis Presley and John Lennon after their sudden deaths in 1977 and 1980 respectively. In Japan, six of his albums made SoundScan Japan's Top 200 Albums chart, and in Poland, Thriller 25 topped the national album chart and was replaced by King of Pop the following week.

In Australia, 15 of his albums occupied the ARIA top 100 as of July 5, four of them in the top ten, with three occupying the top three spots. He had 34 singles in the top 100 singles chart, including four in the top ten. Album sales were 62,015 for the previous week; singles tallied 107,821 units. In the second week, album sales rose from the previous week and tallied 88,650 copies. On July 12, four albums were in the top 10 with three occupying the top three spots. In New Zealand, Thriller 25 topped the chart. In Germany, King of Pop topped the album chart, and from June 28 to July 4, nine of his albums occupied the Top 20 of CAPIF in Argentina. In Billboard's European Top 100 Albums, he made history with eight of his albums in the top ten positions. As of August 3, King of Pop has spent four weeks atop Billboard's European Top 100 Albums chart. The Collection also spent two weeks atop the same chart.

In the UK, on the Sunday following his death, his albums occupied 14 of the top 20 places on the Amazon.co.uk sales chart, with Off the Wall at the top. Number Ones reached the top of the UK Album Chart, and his studio albums occupied number two to number eight on the iTunes Music Store top albums. Six of his songs charted in the top 40: "Man in the Mirror" (11), "Thriller" (23), "Billie Jean" (25), "Smooth Criminal" (28)", "Beat It" (30), and "Earth Song" (38). The following Sunday, 13 of Jackson's songs charted in the top 40, including "Man in the Mirror", which reached number two. He broke Ruby Murray's 1955 record of five songs in the top 30. The Essential Michael Jackson topped the album chart, giving Jackson a second number one album in as many weeks. He had five of the top ten albums in the album chart. In third week sales, The Essential Michael Jackson retained the number one position and Jackson held three other positions within the top five. By August 3, Jackson had sold 2 million records and spent six consecutive weeks atop the album chart. He retained the top spot on the album chart for a seventh consecutive week.

In the US, Jackson broke three chart records on the first Billboard issue date that followed his death. The entire top nine positions on Billboard's Top Pop Catalog Albums featured titles related to him. By the third week it would be the entire top 12 positions. Number Ones was the best-selling album of the week and topped the catalog chart with sales of 108,000, an increase of 2,340 percent. The Essential Michael Jackson (2) and Thriller (3) also sold over 100,000 units. The other titles on the chart are Off the Wall (4), Jackson Five's Ultimate Collection (5), Bad (6), Dangerous (7), HIStory: Past, Present and Future – Book I (8) and Jackson's Ultimate Collection (9). Collectively, his solo albums sold 422,000 copies in the week following his death, 800,000 copies in the first full week, and 1.1 million copies in the following week of his memorial service. He also broke a record on the Top Digital Albums chart, with six of the top 10 slots, including the entire top four. On the Hot Digital Songs chart he placed a record of 25 songs on the 75-position list. In the US, Jackson became the first artist to sell over one million downloads in a week, with 2.6 million sales.

By August 5, Jackson had sold nearly 3.8 million albums and 7.6 million tracks in the US Number Ones was the best-selling album for six out of seven weeks that followed his death. By year's end in 2009, Jackson had become the best-selling artist of the year selling 8.2 million albums in the US He also became the first artist in history to have four of the top 20 best-selling albums in a single year in the US, nearly doubling the sales of his nearest competitor. Jackson was also the third best-selling digital artist of 2009 in the US, selling approximately 12.35 million units. In the 12 months that followed his death Jackson sold nine million albums in the US, and 35 million albums worldwide. By the end of 2013, album sales alone totaled 50 million worldwide according to Billboard. Other reputable sources has since published other figures tallies. His estate also generated revenues of $1 billion. In 2010, Sony Music Entertainment signed a $250 million deal with Jackson's estate to retain distribution rights to his recordings until 2017 and to release seven posthumous albums of unreleased material over the decade following his death, only two of which ended up releasing.

== Services ==
=== Memorial ===
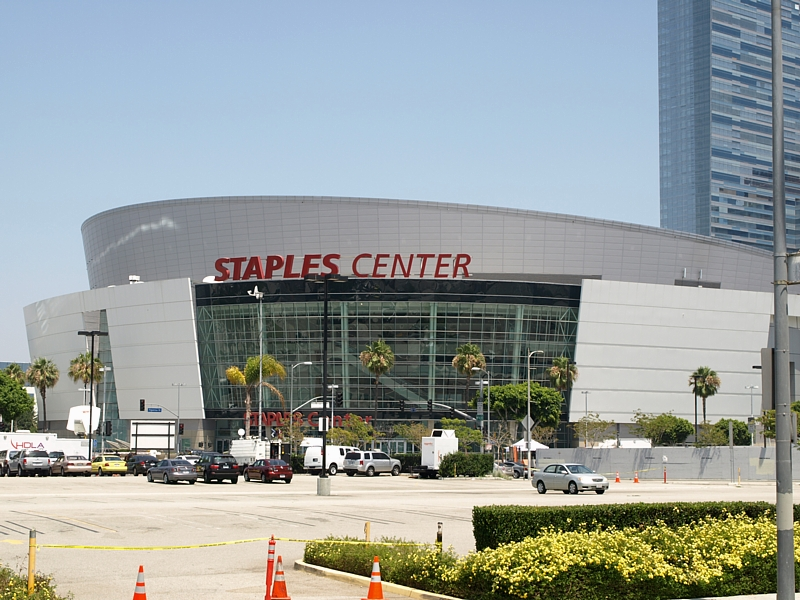
A worldwide audience of an estimated 2.5 to 3 billion people saw coverage of the memorial held in the Staples Center, pictured here during the memorial service.

A private family service was held at Forest Lawn Memorial Park in Los Angeles, after a public memorial at the Staples Center in Los Angeles, California on July 7, where Jackson had rehearsed on June 24, the day before he died. The memorial service was organized by Jackson's concert promoter, AEG Live (who also own and operate the Staples Center). AEG originally planned to charge for tickets, but following public pressure, AEG instead distributed the 17,500 tickets for free through an online lottery that attracted over 1.2 million applicants in 24 hours, and over a half-billion views of the webpage. The service was broadcast live around the world, and was believed to have been watched by more than 2.5 billion persons. (Note: Attributed to multiple references:)

Jackson's solid-bronze casket (which reportedly cost $25,000) was placed in front of the stage. Numerous celebrity guests attended the services. His brothers each wore a single, white, sparkling glove, while Stevie Wonder, Mariah Carey, Lionel Richie, Jermaine Jackson and others sang his songs. Jackson's then 11-year-old daughter, Paris, broke down as she told the crowd, "I just want to say, ever since I was born, Daddy has been the best father you could ever imagine ... and I just want to say I love him ... so much." Marlon Jackson said, "Maybe now, Michael, they will leave you alone."

=== Burial ===
According to reports, Jackson's burial was originally scheduled for August 29, 2009 (which would have been his 51st birthday). His service and burial were held at Glendale's Forest Lawn Memorial Park on September 3, 2009. The burial was attended by his family members, his first wife Lisa Marie Presley, and his friends Macaulay Culkin, Chris Tucker, Quincy Jones, Eddie Murphy, and Elizabeth Taylor, among others. The service began with Jackson's three children placing a golden crown on his casket.

Jackson's funeral cost $1 million, including $590,000 for Jackson's crypt; $11,716 for guest invitations; $30,000 for security and luxury cars; $16,000 for the florist; and $15,000 for the funeral planner. Jackson's family planned the funeral. Howard Weitzman, a lawyer for the estate executors, said that Jackson's "bigger than life" lifespan matched the lavishness of the funeral.

Jackson is interred in the Holly Terrace section in the Great Mausoleum of Forest Lawn Memorial Park, a cemetery in Glendale, California. The mausoleum is a secure facility and is not accessible to the general public or to the media, except on an extremely limited basis. His unmarked crypt, which is partially visible at the tinted entrance of the Holly Terrace mausoleum, is covered in flowers fans leave, which are placed by security guards outside the crypt. The family had considered burying Jackson at Neverland Ranch. However, some family members objected to the site, saying that the ranch had been tainted by the 2005 trial and police raids of the property. Also, the owners of the ranch would have had to go through a permitting process with county and state government before establishing a cemetery at the site. In July 2010, security was increased at the mausoleum due to vandalism by fans leaving messages such as "Keep the dream alive" and "Miss you sweet angel" in permanent ink.
