= Electric Sea =

Studio album by Buckethead
- Released: February 21, 2012
- Studio: Santa Barbara Sound Design
- Genre: Ambient, classical, folk
- Length: 48:05
- Label: Metastation; MT 0025
- Producer: Buckethead; Janet Rienstra-Friesen

Buckethead chronology
Look Up There (2011)	Electric Sea (2012)	Balloon Cement (2012)

Professional ratings
Review scores
Source	Rating
Allmusic	Not rated
Sputnikmusic	4.5/5 stars

Electric Sea is the thirtieth studio album by guitarist Buckethead. It is the sequel to his 2002 release Electric Tears.

== Track listing ==
All tracks are written by Buckethead, except where noted.

No.	Title	Length
1.	"Electric Sea"	6:26
2.	"Beyond the Knowing"	3:54
3.	"Swomee Swan"	4:43
4.	"Point Doom"	5:15
5.	"El Indio"	7:20
6.	"La Wally" (Alfredo Catalani)	3:46
7.	"La Gavotte" (Johann Sebastian Bach)	2:53
8.	"Bachethead" (Bach)	2:05
9.	"Yokohama"	2:52
10.	"Gateless Gate"	1:58
11.	"The Homing Beacon"	6:53
Total length:		48:05

== Credits ==
- Produced by Buckethead and Janet Rienstra-Friesen
- Written, Composed and Arranged by Buckethead
- Production assistance by Dom Camardella
- Engineered, edited and mixed by Dom Camardella at Santa Barbara Sound Design.
- Mastered by Robert Hadley at the Mastering Lab in Ojai, CA
- Art & Design by Russell Mills
- Design assistance: Michael Webster (storm)
- Cover photograph: Breaking Ocean Wave, Baja California Sur, Mexico, by Mark A. Johnson.
- Meta Support: Bella Rienstra
- Made by Meta: Janet Rienstra -Friesen
- Publishing: (Katella Music/BMI) all by Buckethead, except for La Gavotte and Bachethead composed by Johann Sebastian Bach and La Wally (act 1) composed by Alfredo Catalani
- Buckethead thanks: My parents, Michael Jackson, Theo, Uma, Janet, and Lakshmi chicken

== Notes ==
- "Beyond the Knowing" is an instrumental re-release of "What Kind Of Nation" from the album Intelligence Failure, a collaboration with Viggo Mortensen.
- "La Wally" is a composition by Alfredo Catalani.
- "La Gavotte" and "Bachethead" are movements (Gavotte I & II) from Suite No. 6 for solo Cello (BWV 1012) by Johann Sebastian Bach.
- "The Homing Beacon", was originally released exclusively on Buckethead's official website in 2009 without an album. It is a tribute by Buckethead to Michael Jackson after hearing the news of his death.
