= Steven Shafer =

Anesthesiologist and Professor at Standford University

Steven Shafer is a professor of anesthesiology at Stanford University. In 2011, the International Society of Anaesthetic Pharmacology gave him their lifetime achievement award.

== Education ==
Shafer graduated from Princeton University with an A.B. He received his M.D. from Stanford and completed his anesthesia residency at the University of Pennsylvania.

== Career ==
Shafer is the former (2006-2016) editor-in-chief of Anesthesia & Analgesia. He specializes in the clinical pharmacology of intravenous anesthetic drugs. Shafer left Stanford in 2007 to go to Columbia University College of Physicians and Surgeons as a professor of anesthesiology. In 2012, Shafer returned to Stanford as an anesthesia professor in the Stanford University Medical Center. In addition, he is adjunct associate professor of bioengineering and therapeutic sciences at the University of California, San Francisco.

Shafer was a co-founder of PharmacoFore, which subsequently changed its name to Signature Therapeutics. He has held executive positions at other companies, including Pharsight and two software development companies.

Shafer appeared as an expert witness in the Michael Jackson manslaughter trial.

== Bibliography ==
- Shafer, SL; Siegel LC; Cooke JE; Scott JC. (February 1988). "Testing computer-controlled infusion pumps by simulation". Anesthesiology. 68 (2): 261–6. doi:10.1097/00000542-198802000-00013. PMID 3341578.
- Shafer, A; Doze VA; Shafer SL; White PF. (1988). "Pharmacokinetics and pharmacodynamics of propofol infusions during general anesthesia". Anesthesiology. 69 (3): 348–356. doi:10.1097/00000542-198809000-00011. PMID 3261954. S2CID 23629847.
