= Paul Frederick White =

American anesthesiology researcher

Paul F. White
- Born: La Mesa, California
- Education: B.A. Biochemistry, UC Berkeley (1970); Ph.D. Pharmacology, UC San Francisco (1976); M.D., UC San Francisco (1977)
- Occupations: Director of Research, Department of Anesthesiology
- Employer(s): Cedars-Sinai Medical Center; Washington University in St. Louis

Paul Frederick White, FANZCA is a researcher in anesthesiology, research consultant at Cedars-Sinai Medical Center at Los Angeles, retired professor and former holder of the Margaret Milam McDermott Distinguished Chair of Anesthesiology at The University of Texas Southwestern Medical Center at Dallas, and the author and editor of several journals and textbooks on the subject. With over 450 peer-reviewed publications and authorship in 9 anesthesiology textbooks, White has helped shape and revolutionize the field of ambulatory anesthesia and intravenous anesthesia.

== Education and career ==
White graduated from an honors program in Biochemistry at the University of California, Berkeley with Distinction in 1970. He subsequently earned his PhD (Pharmacology) and MD degrees from the University of California, San Francisco. White obtained postgraduate training in both Internal Medicine and Anesthesiology at UC San Francisco, and has board certification in both medical specialties. In 1980, he joined the faculty at Stanford University and became a tenured associate professor and chief of the Outpatient Anesthesiology Service at the University Hospital. In 1988, he accepted the position of professor and vice-chair of clinical research in the Department of Anesthesiology at Washington University School of Medicine. He also served as the medical director of the Barnes Hospital Day Surgery Center. In 1992, he was appointed professor and chairman of the Department of Anesthesiology and Pain Management at the University of Texas Southwestern Medical Center. In June 2011, he retired from the Margaret Milam McDermott Distinguished Chair of Anesthesiology at UT Southwestern. He serves as a representative from the Department on the advisory board of the institution's new Center for Minimally Invasive Surgery. White has also served as a non-paid consultant to the Departments of Anesthesia at both Ohio State University (for ambulatory surgery) and Cedars Sinai Medical Center in Los Angeles (for clinical research and continuing education programs). He has an appointment as a director of research at Cedars Sinai Medical Center for the Department of Anesthesiology. He has also given seminars as a visiting professor at the Renaissance School of Medicine at Stony Brook University Department of Anesthesiology in November 2005 ("Role of Non-Opioid Analgesics," "Fast-Tracking Anesthetic Techniques") and September 2008 ("Ambulatory Anesthesia: Optimal Anesthetic Techniques").

White has edited nine books, including major textbooks on the subspecialties of ambulatory anesthesia and intravenous anesthesia. White has also contributed 88 chapters to textbooks edited by colleagues from around the world. In addition to publishing over 450 peer-reviewed articles, White has written 14 editorials and published over 500 scientific abstracts. Two of White's peer-reviewed publications were listed among the "Top 10" most cited articles in Anesthesiology (and he has the second most citations by any individual author in the specialty). White studies have appeared in USA Today, Washington Post, Wall Street Journal, and other media outlets. White has trained more than 65 postgraduate clinical research fellows during his academic career. He has given over 450 domestic and 390 international lectures. In addition, White has performed over 100 Visiting Professorships in the United States and abroad. White is acknowledged by his colleagues as an international leader in the fields of ambulatory anesthesia and pain management, and has been recognized in the "Best Doctors in America" and "Who's Who in North America." He was awarded the Distinguished Service Award by the Society for Ambulatory Anesthesia, and the Dannemiller Memorial Foundation's award for "Educational Excellence in Anesthesiology."

White has served on the board of directors of three major anesthesia organizations (namely, the Society for Ambulatory Anesthesia [SAMBA], the Society for Intravenous Anesthesia [SIVA], and the International Society for Anaesthetic Pharmacology [ISAP]). White served as the president of the SAMBA organization from 1994 to 1995 and as president of SIVA/ISAP from 1999 to 2000. In addition, White has served as chairman of the Anesthesiology Panel (1985–2000) and was a member of the executive committee of the United States Pharmacopoeia (1995–2000). White has been appointed to five international editorial boards and formerly served as the section editor for ambulatory anesthesia for Anesthesia & Analgesia and the Journal of Clinical Anesthesia. As of April 2019, he is no longer on the editorial board of Anesthesia & Analgesia. Nor is he currently on the board of the Journal of Clinical Anesthesia.

Finally, White has established a not-for-profit foundation (the White Mountain Institute ) to advance education in the creative arts and medicine throughout the world.

White's brother, Ed White, is a former UC Berkeley hall of fame and NFL all pro offensive lineman who played 17 years for the San Diego Chargers and Minnesota Vikings. Ed is an All-time Charger and All-time Viking.

One of his most recent publication in the Journal of Clinical Anesthesia ("Expanding role of multimodal analgesia in facilitating recovery after surgery: From fast-tracking to enhanced recovery") published online 7 January 2019, he is listed as the president of The White Mountain Institute, The Sea Ranch, California. The White Mountain Institute is a not-for-profit private foundation (Federal Tax ID #77-0094396) dedicated to supporting medical education, art and student-athletes.

== Defense expert in Conrad Murray trial ==
In late October 2011, White testified as a defense expert in the trial that found Dr. Conrad Murray guilty of the involuntary manslaughter of Michael Jackson. White testified that the models used by the prosecution's expert, Dr. Steven Shafer, did not show how Jackson would have responded to the drug propofol. White was one of the first to test propofol, and his clinical trial led to approval of the drug by the Food and Drug Administration. White also stated that Murray's treatment of Jackson with propofol was not inappropriate because off-label drug use by doctors is not uncommon or illegal.

In his second day on the stand, White testified that Jackson probably caused his death by injecting himself with propofol while Murray was not looking. White based his conclusion on the level of propofol in Jackson's urine during the autopsy. White also testified that Jackson had taken several tablets of lorazepam, a sedative, which, in conjunction with the propofol, would have killed Jackson instantly.

On cross-examination, White conceded that Murray had violated the standard of medical care by administering propofol in a home setting.

At a hearing on November 16, 2011, Judge Michael Pastor found White in contempt for referring to his discussions with Murray during White's testimony, even though had been warned not to do so. He was fined $250.

== Key research/publications ==
- Doze VA, Westphal LM, White PF, "Comparison of propofol with methohexital for outpatient anesthesia" Anesth Analg, 65:1189–95, 1986 PMID 3490195
- Wagner RL, White PF, Kan PB, Rosenthal MH, Feldman D, "Inhibition of adrenal steroidogenesis by the anesthetic etomidate" N Engl J Med, 310:1415–21, 1984 PMID 6325910
- White PF, Johnston RR, Eger EI, "Determination of anesthetic requirement in rats" Anesthesiology, 40:52-7, 1974 PMID 4810315
- White PF, "Use of patient controlled analgesia for management of acute pain" JAMA, 259:243-7, 1988 PMID 3275811
- White PF, Way WL, Trevor AJ, "Ketamine--its pharmacology and therapeutic uses" Anesthesiology, 56:119-36, 1982 PMID 6892475
- White PF. Expanding role of multimodal analgesia in facilitating recovery after surgery: From fast-tracking to enhanced recovery. J Clin Anesth. 2019;55:105-107, 2019 PMID 30622044
