= Arnold Klein =

American dermatologist (1945–2015)

- Born: February 27, 1945; Mount Clemens, Michigan
- Died: October 22, 2015 (aged 70); Rancho Mirage, California
- Education: University of Pennsylvania (BA, MD)
- Known for: Michael Jackson's dermatologist
- Medical career
- Profession: Physician
- Sub-specialties: Dermatology

Arnold William Klein (February 27, 1945 – October 22, 2015) was an American dermatologist. During the early years of the AIDS epidemic, Klein was among the first physicians in Southern California to diagnose Kaposi's sarcoma in a young patient. In the 1980s, he helped pioneer the cosmetic use of Botox to reduce facial wrinkles and was later described within the medical community as having "fathered the Botox generation." Klein also served on the boards of several charitable organizations and was closely associated with singer Michael Jackson, whom he treated for more than two decades.

== Early life and education ==
Arnold "Arnie" Klein was born on February 27, 1945, in Mt. Clemens, Michigan. He was raised in Michigan and North Miami, Florida, graduating with hall of fame pitcher Steve Carlton from North Miami High School in 1963.

In 1967, Klein earned his bachelor's degree in biology from the University of Pennsylvania. He attended the University of Pennsylvania School of Medicine, earning his Doctor of Medicine degree in 1971. He completed an internship at Cedars-Sinai Medical Center in Los Angeles and his residency in dermatology at the University of Pennsylvania and the University of California at Los Angeles (UCLA). In 1975, he served as Chief Resident in Dermatology at UCLA.

== Career ==
After completing his medical training, Klein established a dermatology practice in Beverly Hills and became known for treating high-profile entertainment and fashion clients. He served as an unpaid, volunteer professor of Medicine and Dermatology at the UCLA David Geffen School of Medicine.

In the infancy of the AIDS epidemic, Klein became one of the very first physicians in Southern California to diagnose Kaposi's sarcoma, a disfiguring cancer commonly associated with AIDS.

Klein gained prominence during the 1980s and 1990s for pioneering cosmetic dermatology techniques, particularly the use of collagen and Botox injections to reduce facial wrinkles. In the mid-1990s, he and other dermatologists began experimenting with Botox as a cosmetic anti-wrinkle treatment before it received FDA approval for that purpose in 2002. His patients included Elizabeth Taylor, Dolly Parton, Cher, Carrie Fisher, and other celebrities.

Often referred to as "Mr. Botox," Klein lectured internationally on cosmetic injectables and trained physicians in the use of Botox. He also served as a consultant and media spokesman for Allergan, the manufacturer of Botox, and published numerous medical articles on botulinum toxin treatments and complications. Klein was also named a consultant to the FDA. He was responsible for the FDA giving Allergan's Botox a black box warning.

In 2004, Klein became the subject of national attention during a malpractice lawsuit brought by Irena Medavoy, who alleged that Botox injections administered by Klein caused serious health complications. The case, which also named Allergan as a defendant, focused on Klein's promotion of Botox for migraines, an off-label use at the time. A Los Angeles jury ultimately ruled in favor of Klein and Allergan.

Klein was an outspoken critic of the misuse of prescription drugs, toxins, and certain synthetic dermal fillers, including ArteFill.

Klein authored more than 150 scientific articles and four medical textbooks, and served as both an editorial board member and reviewer for numerous medical journals in the United States and abroad.

=== Michael Jackson ===
Klein served as the dermatologist for singer Michael Jackson from 1983 to 2009. Klein diagnosed Jackson with discoid lupus erythematosus and vitiligo in the 1980s. In the 1990s, Klein became closely involved in Jackson's personal life after asking his nursing assistant, Debbie Rowe, to look after the singer. Rowe, a nurse at Klein's Beverly Hills office, later became the mother of Jackson's two eldest children, Prince Jackson and Paris Jackson.

Following Jackson's death in 2009, Klein publicly addressed speculation that he was the biological father of the children during an interview on Larry King Live. Klein stated, "Michael loved those children as a father. Those children loved him as a father." When Larry King asked whether he had donated sperm, Klein responded: "Once, to a sperm bank … I think to the best of my knowledge, I'm not the father." He further said that the matter was private and "not to be discussed who the father is over national television."

Klein told King he was working to mitigate the visible effects of Jackson's plastic surgery ahead of the singer's planned This Is It residency, stating: "He had scarring from having a lot of cosmetic surgery. … I was rebuilding his face so he looked much more normal." After Jackson's death, Klein was subpoenaed by the California Medical Board and investigated by the D.E.A. for allegedly overprescribing Demerol to Jackson. Although he was cleared of any criminal wrongdoing and Jackson's physician Conrad Murray was convicted of involuntary manslaughter, the resulting publicity damaged Klein's practice and contributed to his eventual bankruptcy. However, he maintained a clinic in Beverly Hills until his death in 2015.

== Board memberships ==
In August 1985, Klein joined the board of the National AIDS Research Foundation (NARF). A month later, the Foundation merged with the AIDS Medical Association and are now known as amfAR. Over the next two decades, they additionally established the Elizabeth Taylor AIDS Foundation and Art for AIDS in Orange County.

In 2007, Klein founded The Elizabeth Taylor Endowment for the UCLA CARE Center, a facility that focuses on advancing HIV/AIDS research and treatment. In the November 2008 issue of L'Uomo Vogue, in an article related to AIDS in Africa, it was reported that Klein and the organizations which he founded have raised in excess of $274 million for HIV research and care.

Klein served as a trustee to various boards of directors, some of which included the Jennifer Jones-Simon Foundation and The Hereditary Disease Foundation. Klein, alongside his friend Frank Gehry, helped the foundation to raise funds and awareness for inherited diseases. As of 2012, Klein was a member of the advisory board of the AIDS Services Foundation Orange County, now known as Radiant Health Centers.

Klein also co-founded the Rose Tarlow-Arnold W. Klein Breast Cancer Foundation at UCLA which provides breast cancer treatment for individuals who are unable to afford it.

== Death ==
Later in life, Klein had multiple health problems, including multiple sclerosis. He died on October 22, 2015, at the age of 70 at the Eisenhower Medical Center in Rancho Mirage, California.

== Honors and awards ==
He received numerous awards and honors including Who's Who in the World, Best Doctors in America, Men of Achievement, AIDS Services Foundation of Orange County, Award of Merit, Los Angeles Magazine, The Best of L.A., Los Angeles Business Journal, 10 Masters of Medicine in Los Angeles, Haney Scholar, University of Pennsylvania, Inaugural Visiting professor in Cosmetic Dermatology, Harvard School of Medicine, Inaugural Visiting professor in Cosmetic Dermatology, University of Vermont, Measey Scholar, University of Pennsylvania, Philadelphia Foundation Fellow, Public Health Service Post – Doctoral Fellow, and Top Doctors of America.

In 2004, Klein was given a chair in his name at the UCLA Division of Dermatology.
