= The Homing Beacon/The Landing Beacon =

Instrumental by Buckethead

from the album Electric Sea
- Released: July 6, 2009
- Genre: Ambient, acoustic
- Length: 6:56
- Songwriter: Buckethead

"The Homing Beacon" (also known as "The Landing Beacon") is an acoustic song by Buckethead and a memorial tribute to Michael Jackson, who was an early influence on Buckethead. The track has no lyrics, just music, described as "slow, almost peaceful" and has been called a "poignant guitar tribute to Michael Jackson".

== Release ==
The song was originally released on July 6, 2009 through Buckethead's website. Along with the track came a drawing. It seems that there is a draft of the drawing on one side of the paper depicting Jackson in the outfit he was wearing on the "Smooth Criminal" music video doing the famous anti-gravity lean; and on the other side of the paper he depicts Jackson while holding his arm raised above his head, with his finger pointing upwards, another of Jackson's signature stances.

The song was included as the last track on Buckethead's 2012 release Electric Sea.

== Naming ==
The song has two different names because on the 2009 version, the drawing reads "The Homing Beacon - A song for Michael Jackson" but the MP3 file is called "The Landing Beacon" with "A Song for Michael Jackson" as the album title.

On the album version, the song is called "The Homing Beacon".

== Other Buckethead songs referencing or sampling Michael Jackson ==
- "A1" on KFC Skin Piles samples Michael Jackson's "Thriller".
- "The Return of Captain EO" on A Real Diamond in the Rough references Captain EO.
- "Walk on the Moon" on Shadows Between the Sky is another tribute to Jackson.
- The title of the album Captain Eo's Voyage released in 2010 references Jackson. The cover shows his back and one of his jackets, and several tracks allude to Jackson.

== Notes ==
- The last 1:05 of the song may be taken from "What Kind of Nation", from Buckethead and Viggo Mortensen's album Intelligence Failure. It bears a close resemblance to a section of the song which begins at 1:05.
