= People v. Murray =

2011 manslaughter trial in California, US

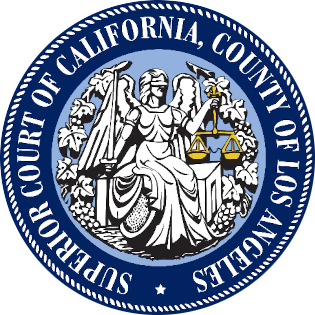
- Court: Los Angeles County Superior Court
- Full case name: People of the State of California v. Conrad Robert Murray
- Decided: November 7, 2011
- Verdict: Murray found guilty of involuntary manslaughter

Case history
- Subsequent actions: Murray was sentenced to four years in prison; he was released on October 28, 2013 after serving 1 year and 11 months.

Court membership
- Judge sitting: Michael E. Pastor

People v. Murray (The People of the State of California v. Conrad Robert Murray) is the American criminal trial of Michael Jackson's personal physician, Conrad Murray, who was charged with involuntary manslaughter for the pop singer's death on June 25, 2009, from a dose of the general anesthetic propofol. The trial, which started on September 27, 2011, was held in the Los Angeles County Superior Court in Los Angeles, California, before Judge Michael Pastor as a televised proceeding, reaching a guilty verdict on November 7, 2011.

The prosecutors in the case, David Walgren and Deborah Brazil, both Los Angeles deputy district attorneys, in their opening statement told jurors, "misplaced trust in the hands of Murray cost Jackson his life." Murray's defense counsel, Edward Chernoff, Michael Peña, J. Michael Flanagan and Nareg Gourjian, claimed Jackson, who was tired and under pressure from rehearsing, took eight tablets of lorazepam (Ativan), a sedative. "When Dr. Murray left the room, Jackson self-administered a dose of propofol that, with the lorazepam, created a perfect storm in his body that ultimately killed him. The whole thing is tragic, but the evidence is not that Dr. Murray did it", Chernoff said. Testimony during the trial showed Murray stayed with Jackson at least six nights a week and was regularly asked—and sometimes begged—by the singer to give him drugs powerful enough to put him to sleep.

Murray told authorities Jackson was especially eager to be administered propofol, a surgical anesthetic that put him to sleep when other powerful sedatives could not. Testimony indicated that propofol, in conjunction with other drugs in Jackson's system, had played the key role in his death. In 2011, the jury found Murray guilty after about eight hours of deliberation, and he was sentenced to four years in prison, but was released after one year and eleven months on October 28, 2013, owing to prison overcrowding and good behavior.

== Timeline of prosecution case ==
=== September 27, 2011: Day 1 ===
Both sides made opening statements. The jury viewed a photograph of Jackson lying on a gurney, taken minutes after he was declared dead. The jury also heard a tape of Jackson's slurred speech near the end of his life. Murray's attorney told the court that Murray is not to blame for Jackson's death, that Jackson gave himself a dose of drugs that killed him so quickly Jackson "didn't even have time to close his eyes." "What happened during that time frame is that the acts and omissions of Michael Jackson's personal doctor Conrad Murray directly led to his premature death at age 50," prosecutor Walgren said. "That misplaced trust in Conrad Murray's hand is the cause of Michael Jackson's death." The first witness, Kenny Ortega, was called to testify.

=== September 28, 2011: Day 2 ===
Michael Amir Williams, known as Jackson's personal assistant, testified.

=== September 29, 2011: Day 3 ===
Two former members of Jackson's staff, bodyguard Alberto Alvarez and Chef Kai Chase, took the stand. Alvarez was the first person into Jackson's bedroom after Murray raised the alarm. He indicated that Murray asked him to place vials from Jackson's bedside cabinet in a bag and remove an IV drip (containing saline solution) from its stand and what appeared to be a propofol bottle, (according to Alvarez), before Murray asked him to phone 911.

=== September 30, 2011: Day 4 ===
Bob Johnson, owner of a company that manufactures pulse oximeters, testified first. The next witness was a former patient of Murray's, Robert Russel from Las Vegas. The third witness was the first paramedic to enter Jackson's house and bedroom, Richard Senneff. The fourth witness was paramedic Martin Blount. Dr. Richelle Cooper, an emergency room physician at UCLA Medical Center, testified fifth. Although not pronounced dead until sometime after reaching the hospital (2:26 pm), the paramedics never saw any signs of life from the time they first entered Jackson's bedroom (12:26 pm).

=== October 3, 2011: Day 5 ===
Cooper continued testifying. According to Cooper, drugs including intravenous sodium bicarbonate, vasopressin, epinephrine, atropine, and dopamine were used during the attempted cardiopulmonary resuscitation of Jackson in the trauma bay of UCLA Medical Center. From the time Jackson was under the care of Cooper until Jackson's death was pronounced, continuous chest compressions and "bagging" were conducted via an endotracheal tube.

Cooper testified that Jackson was clinically dead upon arriving at the hospital, and that Murray had told her he had given Jackson 2 mg of lorazepam (a benzodiazepine) sometime earlier that day, then another 2 mg, which caused the cardiac arrest. During cross-examination, Cooper was asked about the effect of propofol as a sedative. She said about a "milligram per kilogram" would be the starting dose on a patient and would be administered into the patient's arm through an injection port. The administration would take place over a period of "a minute to a minute and a half," and personnel would constantly monitor the patient. She further testified that sedation would be expected to last 10 minutes. When asked what effect "25 mg over 3–5 minutes" would have on a patient, she responded that she would not expect that to have any effect. When asked about administering propofol through an IV drip, she said that only occurs if the patient is intubated and the desired effect is deep sedation.

Next to the stand were employees from phone companies AT&T and Sprint Nextel, who were asked to guide the jury through the meaning of various data on Murray's phone records from June 25, 2009.

Dr. Thao Nguyen, a cardiologist from UCLA Medical Center, testified that she was paged on that day to help with the care of "a V.I.P. patient, named Michael Jackson." She was under the impression the patient was "coding," meaning resuscitation was partially successful. She further testified that when Murray arrived at the hospital, he was "desperate and devastated," and he told the staff: "Do not give up easily, try to save his life."

Nguyen's testimony then turned to the effects of Ativan (brand name of lorazepam), the drug that Murray claimed started Jackson's cardiac arrest. According to Nguyen, Ativan acts on the brain to "make you sleep" and can cause respiratory apnea ("not breathing"). She testified that "you do not typically use narcotics (such as Ativan) to treat insomnia, they are used for sedation," but, when cross-examined, she admitted that it is one of its uses.

Testimony then turned to the use of flumazenil (a benzodiazepine antagonist) as an antidote to Ativan. Ativan would cause the patient to have slurred speech but propofol would not; it is "quick onset [and] quick offset." Propofol is only to be used in a hospital, "not just any hospital room, but only in an intensive care unit or procedure room, by specialist personnel" (an anesthesiologist present throughout its use). Constant monitoring is required because [we] "wouldn't be sure of the patient's tolerance threshold" to the drug and there should be a crash cart at hand. Nguyen also testified that Murray never mentioned propofol.

=== October 4, 2011: Day 6 ===
Stacey Ruggles, Michelle Bella, and Sade Anding, each of whom was in contact with Murray on June 25, 2009, testified about their relationships with him. Anding, who prosecutors believed to be the person Murray was speaking to when he noticed Jackson was not breathing, said she heard coughing and mumbling after Murray stopped speaking on the call, which lasted "three or four minutes."

Murray's girlfriend, Nicole Alvarez, was living with Murray in Santa Monica. She is the mother of Murray's son born in March 2009. They met in Las Vegas in 2005, where she was working in a strip club. She testified about visits to Jackson's home and her plans to travel to London with Murray for the concerts. She also told how she was accepting FedEx packages at her home in Murray's name. Prosecution provided FedEx receipts to the court and Alvarez testified that they were accurate and that her signature was on some of them. Alvarez was the person Murray called while he was in the ambulance with Jackson's body. He showed up at her apartment later that evening.

Tim Lopez, employed by Applied pharmacy services, liaised with Murray over purchases of propofol and Benoquin (brand named preparation of topical monobenzone). He testified about orders Murray placed for propofol and for Benoquin cream, to use in the treatment of the disease vitiligo, from April to June 2009 (225 vials in total). Murray's propofol orders were being routed through his Las Vegas office and then shipped to Alvarez's apartment in Los Angeles. He was also ordering increasing quantities of propofol as time went on.

=== October 5, 2011: Day 7 ===
Sally Hirschberg, a customer service and sales employee of Seacoast Medical, a pharmaceutical distributor in Omaha, Nebraska, was first called to the stand. Testimony included details of Murray's dealing with the firm: he opened an account December 2006; ordered various medical items during April 2009, including "safe site" IV set; and cancelled an order for condom catheters on June 26, 2009. On cross-examination, Hirschberg testified that the items Murray was ordering were not unusual for a medical practice specializing in cardiovascular treatment.

Stephen Marx, a computer forensics examiner working for the DEA in Virginia during June 2009, testified next. He performed an analysis of Murray's iPhone and extracted screenshots, emails, and recordings from it. The emails pertained to medical handwritten notes for patients named Omar Arnold and Paul Farance, in which both names were aliases that Jackson utilized under Murray's care. One email asked Murray: "Is that him too?"

Emails pertaining to Jackson's insurance while in London were also shown. The insurance company confirmed that Murray was Jackson's only doctor since 2006, and that they wanted very thorough medical reports and records and a review of Jackson during rehearsals before agreeing to cover him, but that Jackson had refused authorization to release his medical records.

During the testimony, a recording was played of a conversation between Murray and Jackson from May 10, 2009. The recording featured Jackson's talking about healing the world and helping children because he did not have a childhood, in slurred, almost incomprehensible speech. The recording ended with Murray's asking: "Are you OK?" and with Jackson's replying "I am asleep."

Next to testify was Elissa Fleak, a Los Angeles County coroner for the past eight years. Her duties include investigating deaths (natural/suicide/homicide) and working with medical examiners to determine causes of death. Fleak went to UCLA Medical Center at 5:20 pm on June 25, 2009, to examine Jackson's body and get information surrounding his death. She examined the body in a private room, as well as notes and photographs, and looked for external wounds/injuries; any sign to signal the cause of death. None were found. She took four vials of Jackson's blood for toxicology testing and went to Jackson's house to perform an onsite investigation. While in Jackson's bedroom, she found an empty 20 ml propofol bottle and an empty 5 ml flumazenil bottle on the floor next to the bedside table. She also recovered other prescription drugs, such as diazepam, lorazepam, and tamsulosin (Flomax), one bottle prescribed to Mick Jackson, and some medicines prescribed by Alan Metzger. Other drugs found were Benoquin, hydroquinone, lidocaine, and an oxygen tank beside the bed. Medical equipment recovered included alcohol prep pads, a 10cc syringe with the needle removed, an IV catheter on the floor under an Ambu bag (a brand of bag valve mask), an aspirin bottle, a syringe box, catheters, a jug of urine, and an IV pole with a saline bag and tubing draped over it.

Three bags were recovered: a black bag containing a Starline blood pressure cuff box and 3 bottles of lidocaine; a blue Costco bag (found in the closet) containing "medical debris" including a pulse oximeter, a lanyard, vials, an empty 20 ml propofol bottle, two bottles of midazolam, an opened IV administration set, a urinary leg bag, a wideband bag, two empty dressing bags, two empty catheter bags, opened alcohol prep pads, dressing backings, an empty syringe packet, four vial tops and a needle cap. Also the saline bag with a cut in it containing the "more or less empty" 100 ml propofol bottle that Alvarez recalls removing from the IV stand; and a light blue "baby essentials" bag, containing an array of bottles that included 100 ml propofol and 20 ml propofol bottles (filled to various levels, some opened, some closed), lorazepam, flumazenil, lidocaine, and Benoquin. Murray's business cards from his Houston practice were also found.

=== October 6, 2011: Day 8 ===
Fleak confirmed the presence of an IV stand, a saline infusion set, and a depressed syringe in a y-port connected to the tubing beside Jackson's bed. The court heard that she issued a subpoena to Murray for Jackson's medical records, and only the records pre-2009 were submitted to her. During cross-examination, Chernoff asked Fleak about a number of "mistakes" during her examination, such as picking up a bottle from the floor before photographing it, ignoring the presence of the IV stand, not taking a picture of the propofol bottle inside the cut saline bag (she said she took it out to see what it was then photographed it), and destroying her handwritten notes from June 25, 2009. It was heard that Fleak did not mention the propofol bottle was inside the saline bag in writing until March 2011. The defense suggested that she changed her story to fall into line with other witness' stories regarding the bottle in the bag.

Next called to testify was Dan Anderson, chief toxicologist at the coroner's office. He has 21 years' experience in this field. He tested blood and urine taken from Jackson in UCLA and at autopsy on June 26, 2009. Blood taken from a femoral vein showed propofol (2.6 μg/ml), lidocaine (0.84 μg/ml) and lorazepam (0.169 μg/ml). Blood taken from Jackson's heart showed propofol (3.2 μg/ml), lidocaine (0.68 μg/ml), diazepam (<0.1 μg/ml), lorazepam (0.162 μg/ml), midazolam (4.6 μg/ml) and a hemoglobin percentage of 5.1%. Vials of blood taken from Jackson at UCLA were found to contain propofol (4.1 μg/ml). Other results included liver (lidocaine (0.45 μg/ml), propofol (6.2 μg/ml)), stomach (lidocaine (1.6 μg/ml), propofol (0.13 μg/ml)), urine (jug found in bedroom and more than 500 ml collected at autopsy) (lorazepam, lidocaine, midazolam, propofol and ephedrine), vitreous humour (propofol (0.4 μg/ml)). Propofol was found in all eight specimen samples. Also tested were the 10cc syringe and plunger, the syringe barrel, the fluid in the syringe and the IV tubing (propofol and lidocaine found). No alcohol, barbiturates, cocaine, sedative hypnotics, marijuana, methamphetamine, opiates, codeine, morphine, hydrocodone, or pethidine were found in the samples.

During cross-examination it was heard that post-mortem redistribution occurs in the blood stream, and hence different concentrations of drugs were found in different parts of the body from which they initially entered. It was also heard that: the jug of urine from the bedroom could be from days before and might not even be Jackson's urine, that the low amount of propofol in the vitreous humour was negligible, and that there was no propofol found on the IV pole. The only place it was found was in the lower portion of the tubing and the syringe; the drug proportions couldn't be ascertained.

=== October 7, 2011: Day 9 ===
Dan Anderson continued to answer questions about the levels of drugs in Jackson's system and the substances found in the IV bag (no drugs), tubing, and syringes (in which propofol and lidocaine found) found in Jackson's bedroom. It was heard that the level of lorazepam in Jackson's system (0.162 μg/ml) was within the therapeutic range (0.1–0.2 μg/ml), the level at which it has its desired effect. It was shown that the total amount of lorazepam in Jackson's stomach was 0.046599 mg; about 1/43 of a 2 mg tablet. It was noted that if there were a lot of a certain substance in the blood but not much in the urine then it was recently taken; the same can be said for substances in the stomach.

Fleak was recalled to clarify some issues with photographs and the placement of items in the photographs that she testified to on October 6.

Next called to testify was Detective Scott Smith of the LAPD. With 24 years experience in the LAPD (20 years as a detective), he was working for the Robbery Homicide division during June 2009. On June 25, 2009, he entered the UCLA emergency room at 4:25 pm and stayed until 7 pm. In that time he did not see Murray, but collected CCTV footage of Murray's leaving the ER at 4:38 pm and appearing in the west lobby at 5:02 pm. Before Smith left, he had brief interviews with Mohammed and Alvarez. Smith then went to the Carolwood residence to assist and support the coroner's investigators. It was heard that everyone left the house at 9:30 pm, and Jackson's security was left in charge of the house. On June 26, Smith attended the autopsy, which was deferred pending toxicology, and then went back to the house to further investigate because the Jackson family had handed some items to the police (some rotten cannabis in a shaving kit, some lotion, paper, an envelope, and other "debris"). Inside the shaving kit was a bottle of temazepam prescribed by Murray to Omar Arnold dated September 26, 2008. While at the house, Smith found some empty pill bottles in the master bathroom.

While Smith was on the stand, a two-hour police interview with Murray, taken 48 hours after Jackson's death, was played to the court. It was held in the Ritz Carlton hotel, and Orlando Martinez asked the questions; Chernoff was present. It was heard that Murray first met Jackson in 2006, a security guard (a patient's son) asked Murray to meet him, and Murray first treated Jackson's children for the flu. Amir (Michael Amir Williams) told Murray that Michael Jackson would like Murray to be there for the concerts. Murray understood that he would be an employee of Jackson's, but then discovered his salary would be paid by AEG Live. Murray said Jackson was not a person who ate well, and he was probably seeing doctors for issues he did not disclose to Murray. It was heard that Murray spent six nights a week at Jackson's house, only having Sundays off, and it was usually just Murray, Jackson, and Jacksons' children in the house.

Among Murray's claims in his taped statement to police:

- Amir phoned to say Jackson was finished with rehearsals at 12:10 am and to meet them at the house. Murray got there at 12:50 am; Jackson arrived between 1:00 and 1:05 am.
- Jackson showered; Murray put cream on his body because of dermatological issues.
- At 1:30 am, Murray put an IV saline drip in his leg to treat for dehydration from dancing at rehearsals and gave the benzodiazepine diazepam (10 mg, 1 tablet, orally taken) to help him sleep. He did not sleep.
- At 2:00 am, Murray gave Jackson 2 mg of lorazepam diluted in saline and pushed slowly over 2–3 minutes into the IV line. He observed Jackson stay wide awake for an hour. Jackson complained he could not sleep.
- At 3:00 am, Murray gave Jackson 2 mg midazolam. Jackson was still awake. Murray tried to get Jackson to meditate and turned down the lights and music. His eyes closed and he fell asleep between 3:20 and 3:30 am; 10–12 minutes later he was awake again.
- At 4:30 am, Jackson was still awake and complaining, "need to sleep, must be ready for the concerts, would have to cancel the trip because I cannot function if I don't get sleep." "The medicine doesn't work."
- At 5:00 am, Murray gave Jackson 2 mg lorazepam. Jackson was still awake and complaining about canceling rehearsals, not satisfying fans and there being much pressure.
- At 6:00–6:30 am, Jackson was still awake and still talking.
- At 7:30 am, Murray gave Jackson 2 mg midazolam. It had no effect, and he wondered why Jackson was not responding.
- At 10:00 am, Jackson was still awake. He said he wanted "milk" (propofol) so he could sleep, saying "I know it works."
- At 10:40 am, Jackson said "Just make me sleep, no matter what," "I can't function without sleep," "I have to cancel concerts." Murray claimed that he was under a lot of pressure from Jackson, so he switched to propofol.
- At 10:50 am, Murray administered Jackson a dosage of 25 mg propofol diluted with Lidocaine slowly infused over 3–5 minutes. Lidocaine was used because the propofol could burn the vessels. It had a very quick effect.
- Because of the other drugs in his system, Murray gave 25 mg (the usual dose was 50 mg) before starting the drip to keep him asleep. Murray was asked how often had he given Jackson the "milk," and he answered: "2 months, every day." He was also asked: "before you became his doctor, did you know he was taking it?" Murray said he was surprised about how much Jackson knew about the drug. He knew it worked, he knew how much to put in, knew how to inject it, he said it was the only thing that worked, the lidocaine was needed with it to stop it burning (Jackson called it anti-burn, "anti-burn makes it comfortable"). Other doctors allowed Jackson to push it himself, and Murray "wouldn't allow it" because it made him sleep instantly. Murray kept telling Jackson that it was artificial sleep. Murray said that Jackson's veins were coarse, dried up and filled with clots caused by too much IV use over time. He could not get an IV in his hands.
- At 11:00 am, Jackson was asleep but not snoring. Usually he would be in a deep sleep and snoring, so Murray thought Jackson would wake up again. Murray watched Jackson. Oxygen saturation was 90, heart rate was 70.
- At 11:18 am, Murray felt comfortable, so he got up to go to the bathroom and took some of Jackson's urine with him. Murray said he was gone for two minutes. When Murray returned, Jackson was not breathing and his heart rate was 122. He felt a pulse in Jackson's femoral artery; his body was warm and had not changed color. Murray started CPR and mouth-to-mouth resuscitation. Jackson's chest was rising and falling upon ventilation. Murray looked at the telephone then remembered none of them worked. He could not move Jackson off the bed to do CPR, so he placed his left hand under Jackson's body to continue chest compression. Murray said he did not call 911 because he did not know Jackson's ZIP code. He called Amir to tell security to come up. There was no pulse now, so he lifted his legs to try to get the blood flowing to his heart. He then infused 0.2 mg flumazenil into the IV to try to counteract the lorazepam. He went to the landing to meet Alvarez. Alvarez came in, and Murray told him to call 911 and to help move Jackson onto the floor, which he did. Murray was still giving CPR and mouth-to-mouth when the paramedics arrived and intubated him. They saw PEA (i.e. pulseless electrical activity— they could see a heartbeat but there was no contraction of the heart muscle) and administered atropine, epinephrine and sodium bicarbonate. After 20 minutes, the paramedics (while in contact with UCLA) wanted to call time of death. However, Murray got them to transfer care to him. Murray said "I didn't want to give up, I love Michael, he was my friend, I wanted to help, he was a single parent, thinking about the children, thinking about my own children." CPR continued down to the ambulance; once in the trauma bay, medical personnel tried for at least an hour. "[The emergency medical staff] would have given up without me," said Murray. They pronounced him dead, but Murray would not sign the death certificate because he did not know the cause of death.
- Chernoff prompted Murray to tell the police about the last three days. Murray said Jackson wanted "milk" nightly, but Murray did not want to administer it, because it was not natural sleep and could be a hazard. "I tried to wean him off it with his knowledge to have more natural sleep. I had never seen any study where someone had been addicted to propofol." Murray gave him lesser amounts (lower doses and lower drip rate) and gave lorazepam and midazolam as well. Jackson told Murray he wanted to "go all the way, other doctors would do it." Murray said that the lorazepam and midazolam were not working. Jackson was suffering from withdrawal, and his mind was forcing him to stay awake. Murray stated he "tried all night, but nothing would work. Gave him propofol just so he would get a couple of hours of sleep." "I didn't want to hurt him, he was my friend, didn't want MJ to fail, I cared about his writing and his producing, I tried to wean him off, MJ was a bit restless, but it was working."

=== October 11, 2011: Day 10 ===
The proceedings began with the conclusion of the recording of Murray's interview with the police from 48 hours after Jackson's death. Afterwards, Smith continued his testimony. Smith never mentioned in any notes referencing a propofol bottle being inside a saline bag during searches of Jackson's home in June 2009. He saw the propofol bottle beside a cut saline bag after Fleak had removed them from the Costco bag and it was the only saline bag found. Search warrants were executed of Murray's house in Las Vegas, offices in Las Vegas and Houston, his girlfriend's apartment, his warehouse and his car, and no propofol was found. During brief statements taken from Mohammed and Amir at the hospital on June 25, 2009, neither of them mentioned Murray asking to be brought back to the residence. Alvarez did not mention propofol in an IV bag or Murray asking him to put things in bags until after the cause of death was released on August 27, 2009.

Dr. Christopher Rogers, chief of forensic pathology at the coroner's office, testified he had conducted the autopsy of Jackson on June 26, 2009. There was nothing obvious indicating the cause of death, and he was healthier than the average person of his age because there was no atherosclerosis on the walls of his coronary arteries. Jackson did not have heart disease, and there were no irregularities in his heart. There was no evidence of natural disease or trauma, his esophagus was intact with no milky fluid there or in the stomach. The stomach contained no pills or capsules. His mouth, upper airway and trachea were all intact with no foreign material present. Rogers took samples from each organ and sent them to the relevant experts for consults because he was not able to determine the cause of death and wanted a toxicological analysis. Rogers also requested Jackson's medical records from Murray but never received them.

After toxicological analysis, Rogers determined the cause of death to be acute propofol intoxication with contributing effects from benzodiazepines exacerbating respiratory and cardiovascular depression. When asked about the manner of death, he testified it was a homicide. Propofol was not necessary— it was outside of a hospital or clinic, and the proper equipment to be used with propofol was not there. Murray administered too much propofol. The "circumstances do not support self-administration" because Jackson would have had to have woken up, self-administer the drugs, circulate to the brain, and then be found not breathing – all in the space of 2 minutes. Rogers said that was a "less likely scenario." The "more likely scenario" was that "Murray was estimating the doses" to give Jackson and that "Murray accidentally gave too much." There was a cut in the rubber stopper in the propofol inconsistent with a needle but a medical device called a spike, which is used to get the liquid to flow out, to "set up constant flow" of the drug.

During cross-examination, Rogers testified that the only evidence of propofol in the medical equipment was in the syringe, in the Y-connector and the tubing thereafter. None was found in the upper tubing or the IV saline bag. Defense council Flanagan asked "Would 25 mg propofol pushed over 3-5 minutes make the patient sleep?" Rogers replied yes. Flanagan: "How long would they sleep for?" Rogers: "Approximately 5 minutes." Flanagan: "So a 25 mg dose of propofol at 10:50 am would have no effect after 11.05?" Rogers: "Correct." Flanagan: "After this you would assume the patient sleeping was caused by something else and not propofol, wouldn't you?" Rogers: "Yes." The therapeutic blood concentration range of propofol required for major surgery was 4 μg/ml, and for lesser operations it was 2 μg/ml. Jackson had 2.6 μg/ml in his femoral blood, which is used for post-mortem examination because as it is not located near any large organs and is less prone to redistribution after death. Rogers stated that a lethal level of propofol has been documented anywhere between 1 and 17 μg/ml. Jackson's stomach level of lorazepam was 0.64 μg/ml, and his femoral blood level was 0.169 μg/ml. It was hypothesized that Jackson must have ingested lorazepam fairly close to the time of death for it not to have been absorbed and distributed yet. Flanagan: "A 2 mg pill of lorazepam gets you to 0.018 μg/ml blood level?" Rogers: "Yes, in Shafer's literature." Flanagan: "If you pushed (all at once) a dose of lorazepam to get you to 0.169 μg/ml blood level, it would stop your heart, wouldn't it?" Rogers: "Yes."

On redirect, Walgren asked whether it would still be a homicide if Jackson had self-administered the propofol or lorazepam because of the negligence by Murray, and Rogers said, "Correct." Walgren asked whether the propofol found was the same as in major surgery, and Rogers replied, "Yes." Walgren: "Would 25 mg over 3–5 minutes get you to 2.6 μg/ml blood level?" Rogers: "No."

=== October 12, 2011: Day 11 ===
Dr. Alon Steinberg, a cardiologist for 13 years and board-certified in cardiovascular diseases, Cardiac CT and Nuclear Cardiology, testified that he was not an expert in anaesthesia or pharmacology and that Murray was not board-certified in June 2009. Of the three degrees of breaching the standard of care (no deviation, mild deviation, extreme deviation), this case was the first time Steinberg has seen extreme deviations from the standard of care. Steinberg testified that propofol is only used in cases of needing deep sedation when the patient will go through a significantly painful procedure and there are risks that the patient could stop breathing; that is why it is used with constant monitoring and emergency equipment on hand. He testified that he only uses propofol when performing cardioversions and that he is required to have an anaesthetist present. For instances of mild and moderate sedation, Steinberg stated that he would use benzodiazepines and would never prescribe propofol for insomnia. He received Murray's case and was asked to review his acts and omissions against the standard of care. The review was based on Murray's own words from his police interview previously heard by the court. His findings: "Six separate and distinct extreme deviations from the standard of care."

1. Propofol is not medically indicated for sleep. "I have never even heard of it being used for insomnia, it is a very powerful surgical sedation agent." There was also no informed consent signed by the patient. Risks, benefits, indications and alternatives should all be explained, understood and agreed before any treatment.
2. Propofol was being administered in the home, with no equipment, no medical personnel, no back-up and no physical observation by the attending physician. "Each of these individually would be an extreme deviation on [its] own." Equipment needed for propofol: alarm on the pulse oximeter, automated blood pressure cuff, EKG to monitor heart rhythm, ambu bag for ventilation assistance, a backboard for chest compressions, a back-up generator in case the power goes out, a way to summon help and a device for keeping the airway open such as an endotracheal tube. Murray had none of this equipment.
3. Inadequate preparation for emergency situation. Attending physician must have the drugs and personnel prepared. Personnel required: Intubation specialist to rescue the airway, nurses for the procedures, emergency personnel close by, and an anaesthesiologist. Personnel trained in basic life support and advanced life support should be in attendance to deal with the airway maintenance, IV maintenance and any arrests that may occur. Drugs required during sedation in the event of an emergency: flumazenil, naloxone, lidocaine, atropine, beta blockers, dopamine, epinephrine, methylprednisolone. All of these should be available in a crash cart very close by.
4. Improper care during arrest. Jackson had a respiratory arrest, and Murray did not follow the protocol for such an event. During respiratory arrest, the patient stops breathing, causing the oxygen levels in the blood to drop lower and lower, which causes the heart rate to increase. Lack of oxygen weakens the heart, and the heart will have electricity present but will not contract (pulseless electrical activity). Finally, the heart's electricity dies (asystole). Murray should have tried to arouse Jackson, placed an ambu bag over his mouth, cleared the airway, called 911 and administered flumazenil. Instead, Murray started chest compressions, which do not help respiratory arrest. "The heart was already working, he didn't need chest compressions." Even then, the CPR was of poor quality, since it should have involved having both hands on a hard surface rather than having one hand on a bed.
5. Failure to summon emergency help. Murray should have called 911 on his cell phone immediately. Instead he waited until 12:21 pm, which was approximately 20 minutes after Jackson stopped breathing. Help was four minutes away. "I would have allowed two minutes to check the situation before calling 911. He had a cell phone."
6. Failure to maintain proper medical records. No informed consent. No records of Jackson's vital signs, doses given, [or] responses to the medication. Murray was confused or dishonest about the records when they got to the emergency room.

Question: "Dr. Murray's deviations in the standard of care contributed to Jackson's untimely death?" Steinberg: "Yes." Question: "If Jackson administered the drugs to himself, was it still gross negligence?" Steinberg: "Yes." All medicines are kept in locked and passworded cabinets. There would have been no opportunity for self-administration in a proper setting.

During cross-examination, Steinberg testified that if the patient had a blood pressure (caused by there being a pulse) and a pulse of 122, he was savable. If a patient is not breathing but has a pulse, the course of action is to clear the airways and give breaths.

Next to the stand was Dr. Nader Kamanger, board-certified in internal medicine, pulmonary medicine, critical care, and sleep medicine. He employs propofol daily for sedation when placing an endotracheal tube. It is the classic induction agent for deep sedation during painful procedures. It is the most common drug for maintaining sedation on patients on mechanical breathing apparatus. Doctors have to call an anaesthesiologist to administer it, someone who can maintain the airway, and someone who can reverse the effects of the drugs. Kamanger also pointed out Murray's extreme deviation of the standard of care, consistent with Steinberg's testimony.

=== October 13, 2011: Day 12 ===
Next to the stand was Steven Shafer, a professor of anesthesiology at Columbia University since 2007 and adjunct professor of anesthesiology at Stanford University since 2000. He is an expert on pharmacokinetics (rate of onset of drug action, duration of action, and elimination of drug action, in sum) and pharmacometrics with 20 years of experience working with the Food and Drug Administration (FDA). His field of interest involves mathematically modeling how a dose of drug translates to concentrations in the body and its effects on a patient. He has published 19 papers about the pharmacokinetics of propofol. Pharmacokinetics involves the study of the dilution of drug in a patient's blood stream. Shafer is the current editor in chief for the Journal of Anesthesia and Analgesia and on the editing board of many other journals.

He testified about the history of the dosing guidelines of propofol.

=== October 19–20, 2011: Days 13 and 14 ===
Shafer showed a video of the use of propofol during a procedure. He testified about his review of the Murray case. He found seventeen "separate and distinct egregious violations" of the standard of care, of which four were unconscionable, based on Murray's police interview:

1. The lack of the basic emergency airway equipment.
2. The lack of the advanced emergency airway equipment.
3. The lack of suction apparatus.
4. The lack of an IV infusion pump.
5. The lack of alarmed pulse oximetry.
6. The failure to use a blood pressure cuff.
7. The lack of an electrocardiogram.
8. The lack of capnography.
9. The failure to maintain a doctor-patient relationship.
10. The failure to continuously monitor the mental status of the patient.
11. The failure to continuously monitor the breathing of the patient.
12. The failure to continuously monitor blood pressure and pulse oximetry, and to have heart monitors.
13. The failure to call 911 immediately.
14. The failure to chart at the outset of the procedure (egregious and unconscionable).
15. The failure to maintain written informed consent (egregious and unconscionable).
16. The failure to document throughout the course of sedation (egregious and unconscionable).
17. The failure to disclose to both the paramedics and UCLA the use of propofol and what Murray witnessed at the arrest.

Question: "Each one of these seventeen egregious violations is individually likely or expected to result in injury or death to Michael Jackson?" Response: "Yes."

Shafer showed simulations of propofol and lorazepam on his computer models. (i) If the drugs were bolus pushed: He stated that the drugs administered (as described in Murray's interview statement) could not have produced the femoral blood levels at autopsy. He also testified that Jackson repeatedly self-administrating the drugs would not have caused the femoral blood levels found at autopsy. (ii) If the drugs were IV administered: Administration by continued IV infusion would produce the femoral blood levels found at autopsy very shortly after initiation of the drip. After the patient stops breathing, the heart would still be beating so the IV would continue. This scenario would result in the blood levels at autopsy. According to Shafer: "That's what I think happened, based on all the evidence."

Shafer demonstrated the set-up of an IV infusion of propofol. The IV line for propofol would need an air vent to allow air into the bottle and an infusion pump to control the dose. Without a pump, it is very hard to control the dose. He testified that he had never seen anything like the cut bag set-up and had never seen anyone do it.

Walgren asked Shafer a number of questions regarding his testimony over the last few days:

- "You have noted seventeen egregious violation from the standard of care, four of which you found were unconscionable?" "Yes."
- "Showed us the video in which you demonstrated the safe and proper mean to administer sedation" "Yes." "And it is your opinion that those safeguards and that equipment is necessary even if the physician [intends] on administering just 25 mg of propofol?" "Yes."
- "You have explained to us why it is impossible that Michael Jackson died as a result of orally swallowing propofol?" "Yes."
- "You discussed lorazepam and you concluded that Michael Jackson received more than the 4 mg of lorazepam that Dr. Murray claimed to have given Michael Jackson?" "Yes."
- "You also rejected the notion that certainly at ten o' clock am that Michael Jackson swallowed eight 2 mg tablets of lorazepam?" "Yes." "And you would broaden that window to four hours meaning between eight and noon based on what was found in the stomach it was impossible that Michael Jackson swallowed that amount of lorazepam?" "Correct."
- "You demonstrated here the simulation of how one would infuse propofol with this type of set up and with some of the evidence recovered in this case?" "Yes." "And that the infusion line with the propofol in it could be compacted into the fist of my hand?" "Yes."
- "Taking all the evidence that you've reviewed and all the deviations from the standard of care, you've concluded that Conrad Murray was not only a substantial factor, but a direct cause of Michael Jackson's death?" "Yes."
- "Had all this transpired as relayed by Dr. Murray and subsequent to that Michael Jackson had either injected propofol and/or swallowed lorazepam tablets, is it still your opinion that Conrad Murray was a direct cause, not just a substantial factor, of Michael Jackson's death?" "Absolutely." "And why is that?" "That's because he is a physician who has brought propofol into the room, started an intravenous and provided access to propofol to a patient who may in fact be developing a dependency on sedatives, and he has been entrusted by Michael Jackson to look after his safety every night and he has failed that responsibility by enabling the administration of intravenous propofol. He is responsible for every drop of propofol in that room." "And lorazepam?" "Every drop of lorazepam in that room."
- "And that's because Conrad Murray set up the situation when he abandoned the patient in the room?" "Yes."

=== October 21, 2011: Day 15 ===
Chernoff cross-examined Shafer on his CV and about his relationship with the defense's expert Dr. Paul White.

=== October 24, 2011: Day 16 ===
The cross-examination of Shafer concluded, and the prosecution rested.

== Timeline of defense case ==
=== October 24, 2011: Day 16 ===
The first witness called was Donna Norris from the Beverly Hills Police Department (BHPD). She is the manager of the 911 system of the BHPD. It was heard that the 911 call on June 25 at 12:20:18 lasted 46 seconds and was made from a cell phone.

The next witness called was Alexander Supall, a police surveillance specialist working for LAPD. He has been in this role for eleven years. It was heard that Mr. Supall went to the Jackson residence on the day to check the surveillance tapes. He said he didn't locate where the cameras were or how many of them there were. The defense then played two surveillance videos involving Jackson and Murray's arrivals at the residence.

The next witness to testify was LAPD Detective Dan Myres. He works in the robbery homicide division and has been with the LAPD since March 1994. He joined the investigation of the Jackson death on the Monday after June 25, 2009. It was heard that Myres interviewed Alberto Alvarez on June 25 and August 31. In his initial statement he didn't mention putting away vials or a vial or bottle in an IV bag.

The next witness to the stand was LAPD Detective Orlando Martinez. Also in the robbery homicide division, Martinez has been with the LAPD for ten years. On hearing of Jackson's death, he went to UCLA and was present for half of Alvarez's interview. He stated that Alvarez didn't mention putting away vials for Dr. Murray or seeing a vial or bottle inside an IV bag. It was heard that Mr. Walgren had a meeting with Alvarez and Myres in his office in April 2011. Martinez brought (from the case's evidence) a saline bag, a propofol bottle and a pulse oximeter to the meeting. Alvarez didn't recognize the propofol bottle shown to him. Alvarez was asked to draw the saline bag he saw after he described something at the bottom of the bag which looked to be a port or some kind of apparatus.

The next witness was Dr. Allan Metzger, a physician, general internalist and rheumatologist since 1974, based in Los Angeles since 1981. Metzger began treating Michael Jackson in the 1990s for various things, but became closer to Jackson through the birth of his children and ultimately became a friend. Metzger was Jackson's primary physician in Los Angeles. He received a call from Jackson on June 12, 2008, concerning sleep issues, skin issues, and nutrition; he had not spoken to Jackson in the prior five years.

Jackson called for Metzger to come over in April 2009 to review his health issues. It was not unusual for him to visit the house. The three children, Jackson and some security guards were present on visit. The conversation was about medical issues and Jackson's rehearsal schedule. Jackson wanted to do 50 shows but was worried about nutrition. They also talked about hydration before and after performing. It was heard that Jackson had had sleep issues for 15–20 years, particularly after performing. Metzger had infrequently treated Jackson for his sleep issues over the years on tours. In April 2009, he asked Metzger about IV sleep medication, calling it 'juice', but Metzger was unsure what Jackson was referring to. Jackson believed no oral medication would help him; he had tried Tylenol PM (a combination product containing paracetamol/acetaminophen and the sedating antihistamine diphenhydramine), Xanax, clonazepam, trazodone, and others. Jackson was of the opinion that none of it worked. It was heard that Metzger told Jackson that IV sleep medication was dangerous and should not be administered outside of a hospital. It was then heard that Metzger did not speak to Jackson again between this April 2009 meeting and the singer's death. The prosecution asked Metzger if he ever did provide Jackson with propofol; Metzger replied "No". The prosecution asked Metzger if there were any amount of money that might persuade him to provide Jackson or any other patient with propofol; Metzger again replied "No."

Next to the stand was nurse practitioner Cherilyn Lee. Lee helps entertainers and athletes with nutritional issues. Lee is a board-certified nurse practitioner and is legally allowed to prescribe medications, but she chooses not to. Faheem Muhammad called Lee to treat Jackson's children who had a cold. She told him she wasn't a pediatrician but she was invited anyway. Lee went to the house in Jan 2009 after making an appointment. Jackson asked what she did and he mentioned that he was tired and he wanted nutrition therapy. Lee asked Jackson to fast that night and she went back the next day to do an assessment: Jackson completed a physical test and blood was drawn for testing. Lee wanted to determine the cause of Jackson's tiredness. She noticed he drank Red Bull a lot, which can cause fatigue. He said he would sweat a lot during rehearsals; he could lose 5-7 pounds because of it. Lee said Jackson's vital signs were normal and provided him with high-concentrated smoothies and low dose nutritional IV. Lee stated that after the first IV (amino acid) in early Feb, he felt a lot better and more energized. In March 2009, Jackson said he couldn't sleep and Lee recommended natural sleep products. He said they don't work for him. Jackson said, "when I need sleep I need it right away," when they met on Easter Sunday. Jackson wanted her to see that he did not sleep well. Jackson also wanted to show her that natural supplements were not working. It was heard that Lee wanted to conduct sleep studies, but Jackson said he did not have time for that. Jackson invited her to stay and watch how he didn't sleep. Lee gave him the energy IV and 'sleepy tea' but she observed that he woke up at 3 a.m.. He could only sleep for about 5 hours and he repeated to her that he cannot sleep the whole night. Lee stated that Jackson's veins were very small. Jackson started to talk about getting medication for sleep around Easter.

=== October 25, 2011: Day 17 ===
The judge ruled that Jacksons's contract with AEG Live for the O2 gigs would not be admitted into evidence.

Nurse Practitioner Cherilyn Lee was still on the stand. It was heard that Lee is a believer of holistic health and has a PhD in it. Chernoff began by clearing up some of the dates in her records:

- April 12, Easter Sunday: went to Jackson's house; he said he needed products for sleep.
- April 19, Sunday morning: went out to Jackson's house; he said he "just can't sleep" and was having a lot of difficulty. Jackson expressed his desire for Diprivan (propofol), which he said was the only medication that makes him fall asleep straight away. Lee was concerned at Jackson's familiarity with this drug. Jackson told Lee he had been administered Diprivan before but only for surgery, not for anything else. Lee told Jackson she didn't know what Diprivan was, so she called a doctor friend of hers who said it was an anesthetic used for surgery in hospitals. Jackson told Lee that other doctors had told him that Diprivan was safe to use if usage were concomitant with his being monitored throughout. Jackson then asked Lee to stay that night so that she may see how he was unable to sleep; she did so. Jackson slept for five hours, then woke up and was upset both that he had not slept longer, and that the nutritional medicine wasn't working. He then said "the only thing that helps is Diprivan; can you find someone to help me sleep?" and added "As soon as Diprivan gets in my veins it knocks me out and I go to sleep right away." Lee replied "I know you want to be knocked out, but what if you don't wake up?" Jackson replied "I just need to be monitored." Lee told Jackson that no one who cared or had his best interests at heart would supply him with propofol. Jackson complained to Lee that not sleeping would "mess up my performance." Lee informed Jackson that one of the anesthetic's side effects was memory loss, and asked him "What if you forget your lines?" Jackson replied that he never would, and hugged her. Lee left; she never saw Jackson again.
- June 21, 2009: Jackson's bodyguard called Lee and said Jackson wanted to see her. Lee could hear Jackson in the background instructing his bodyguard to tell Lee what was wrong, which was that one half of his body was hot, while the other half was cold. Lee replied that she was too far away (Florida) to examine Jackson, and that he should go to the hospital. Lee recognized the symptoms and suspected that Jackson was on propofol.

Next on the stand was Amir Dan Rubin, a hospital executive in Stanford, California. Chief Operating Officer for UCLA Medical Center in June 2009 and responsible for operation systems. Rubin worked in the administration area. He explained the layout of UCLA Medical Center where he worked in the administration area. Rubin was paged when "a patient of interest" was brought to the emergency room. He proceeded to secure the area for privacy and security purposes. He was present at the hospital for a discussion about releasing a press release with CEO of AEG Live (Randy Phillips) and Jermaine Jackson. The statement was released by Jermaine Jackson in the basement of the hospital; it was stated that Michael Jackson had died. Rubin said that Murray suggested that the reason for death, "unknown," should be in the press release.

Next on the stand was Brandon Keith Phillips, President and CEO of AEG Live, division of AEG, for nine and a half years. He has worked in the entertainment industry for thirty years. AEG are the owners and operators of the Staples Center in Los Angeles and The O2 Arena in London. Phillips was responsible for profit and loss, booking talent for tours, making sure regional offices function properly as well as festival division. Phillips represented Jackson as an agent/consultant as early as 1993.

It was heard that Phillips met Jackson in September 2008 with Jackson's manager (Dr. Tomei) at the Bel-Air hotel about concerts. Phillips laid out plans for a new tour; a residency show at the O2 arena in London, move the "mountain to Mohammed"; this can only happen with such a big star. This was the first phase of a "multi-year" tour. It was apparent that Jackson was motivated, energized and receptive to the idea. They had numerous meetings afterwards. One reason Jackson wanted to do the concerts was to settle down and make a good home for the children and not live like "vagabonds." The contract was drawn up and signed (in mid-Jan 2009) for thirty one shows; Jackson wanted to do ten more than Prince did. Chernoff asked questions about the finances of the contract. All questions were objected to and the judge sustained them. It was heard that ten shows went on sale first and the demand was "over the top." "We had never seen that kind of demand for tickets; it was obvious we would have blown through thirty-one shows in the pre-sale and not had any [left] for general sales." Within twenty minutes Jackson agreed to more shows. Jackson said he wanted to do maximum fifty shows because he didn't want a passport, didn't want to live in London. He asked for a country house estate (16+ acres with running streams) so he and the kids wouldn't be stuck in a hotel in London. He also wanted Guinness World Records to be there at the fiftieth show. It was heard that Jackson was very firm about having his own (24/7) physician (Murray). It was heard that Phillips met with Murray and Jackson in early June 2009 to discuss Jackson's health. Murray assured Phillips he was in great health and that Murray would look after Jackson's diet. It was heard that Kenny [Ortega] told Phillips that he was concerned about Jackson's focus in performances in a production of this magnitude. Phillips started seeing stress and pressure in Ortega towards the middle of June because of this. There was an issue of Jackson showing up for performances. Ortega said he needed to be there because he was the fulcrum; everything surrounded him in the production. Ortega scheduled a meeting for June 20 which would be about Michael Jackson's tardiness and focus at rehearsals. It was heard that, based on Kenny Ortega's email, it was clear he felt this was an emergency meeting. The meeting was with Murray, Jackson, Ortega and Phillips at Carolwood house. Ortega didn't understand why Jackson wasn't as engaged as he thought he would be. "Michael didn't respond immediately. Murray spoke for Michael on the situation, guaranteed us that Michael would get into it." Phillips attended rehearsals on June 23–24 to make sure everything was back on track. On June 25, Phillips went to hospital and stayed there the entire time Jackson was there. "I was there all day into the evening." Murray was in "severe distress."

The next defense witness was toxicologist Michael Henson, a tech operations officer at Pacific Toxicology. Defense attorney Michael Flanagan doing direct examination. Henson has known Flanagan since 2009. His company had worked with Flanagan for quite some time. Henson examined urine samples handed over from LA County Coroners Office. He also provided defense testing for stomach content of lorazepam. It was heard that Dr. Shafer emailed Henson about what his standard operating procedure (SOP) for lorazepam results was, but he did not email Shafer back and contacted Flanagan instead. During cross-examination, Walgren asked Henson why the People and the Defense have 2 different copies of lorazepam results. Henson said he did not know.

=== October 26, 2011: Day 18 ===
The first witness of the day was Gerry Causey, who lives in Cedar City, Utah. Causey had known Murray for 11 years. They met when he lived in Las Vegas, when Causey had a heart attack. "Murray made me sign some paperwork, some kind of release, then they took me to the operating room for an angiogram." "During my procedure I didn't want to be sedated. I saw everything on the screen. He always explained me everything he was doing." He has been in constant contact with Murray ever since he was in hospital. They have remained friends. It was heard that they have remained friends because of the love Dr. Murray has for his patients. Causey has stated Murray is his "best friend." Causey said that Murray was not greedy and that he never has been. He would treat patients regardless of whether they had insurance or not. Murray broke down in tears when Causey said Murray would spend all time necessary with him, he would call his wife to explain problems. It was heard that Causey had given two TV interviews regarding Murray. He gave them free of charge "to help my friend." During cross-examination, Causey said that Dr. Murray is known for "his compassion, his feelings—you can ask any of his patients; he's the best doctor in the world." "I don't think he did what he's accused of. From what I know, what I feel right now he didn't do it." Walgren asked Causey whether he would come and testify on the Murray's behalf, even if he knew Murray was grossly negligent. He said yes. Causey was excused and as he walked out, he kissed Dr. Murray on the forehead and shook his hand.

Next to the stand was Andrew Guest, also a previous patient of Murray's from Las Vegas. Guest described how he first met Murray during the procedures he went through for his heart. Guest said "that man sitting there is the best doctor I have ever seen" "I'm alive today because of that man." It was heard that Guest did an interview, free of charge, with CNN because he believed Murray needed support and wasn't getting a "fair shake." Walgren asked: "Nothing would change your opinion of that man, would it?" Guest replied: "Correct."

Next to the stand was Lunette Sampson. Another patient of Murray's. She now lives in San Diego, but lived in Las Vegas for long time. Sampson had 2 heart attacks while in Las Vegas, Dr. Murray treated her. "I have never had a doctor that was more caring and thorough." When asked if she thought Murray was greedy or was motivated by money she said: "I know Dr. Murray is not greedy or money-hungry. He is taking care of people pro-bono, people without money." Sampson said Murray never once mentioned he was going to work with Jackson. "He told me he was going to take sabbatical for a year."

Next called was Dennis Hix. He had heart problems and got stents (Coronary stent), the last one around 2004–2005. Murray's children's were his neighbors. It was heard that Hix is 66 years old, and he has gone to various other doctors and never had one who gave him the care he did. "I had insurance that didn't hardly pay for nothing (sic); he said he would help. When my brother saw I got the stents, my brother said he wanted some too. He had heart issues but didn't have money for the procedure. Dr. Murray told my brother not to worry about the payment, that he would treat him for free. And he did." Walgren asked Hix: "When did you learn Dr. Murray was going on tour with Jackson?" Hix replied, "I didn't even know it until I saw it on TV."

Next to the stand was Reuby Mosley. She lives in Houston. She's the secretary of Acres Home Citizen's Council, a low income seniors' community. Dr. Murray's father was a doctor in the Acres Home district. Dr. Murray opened the clinic in his father's memory. "He made a commitment to the community to open a clinic in memory of his dad" (Dr. M Snr was there from 1968 until 2003). Upon Chernoff asking if Murray was greedy, Mosley replied "if this man was greedy, he would've not come to work at Acres Home, where 75% of people are poor. He was making less than in Las Vegas." Murray treated Mosley for heart problems.

=== October 27, 2011: Day 19 ===
First to take the stand was Dr. Robert Waldman, a physician specializing in internal medicine, nephrology and addiction medicine with twenty-three years experience who has been treating patients who have addiction diseases, but is not board-certified in it. He described to the court what happens to a patient during addiction and withdrawal, including the tell-tale signs, symptoms, and drugs that can be involved. Dr. Waldman stated that the side effects of drug withdrawal include sweating, increased heart rate, nausea, cramps, insomnia, temperature deregulation, and tremendous anxiety. It was heard that the addict's biggest fear is that others will not respect the amount of discomfort they will be undergoing during the treatment and detoxing process. It was also heard that rapid detox is not a valid treatment; it employs high levels of sedation delivered intravenously in order to procure a state of general anesthesia in the patient to help him or her tolerate the discomfort associated with withdrawal. It was heard that Dr. Waldman's opinion is that there is evidence to suggest Jackson was dependent on (not addicted to) Demerol (pethidine) due to the frequent high doses he received in May 2009, as indicated by Dr. Klein's medical records of Omar Arnold (an alias of Jackson's). It was heard that Dr. Klein's medical records indicate that in April 2009, Jackson received 775 mg of Demerol over three days for Botox and Restylane procedures, and that in May 2009 Jackson again received another 900 mg of Demerol over three days for the same two procedures. Dr. Waldman opined that being injected with very high doses of Demerol over six days could create opioid dependency in anyone.

Next on the stand was Dr. Paul White, a physician with an interest in intravenous anesthesia who started working with propofol in 1983 (the FDA approved it for general anesthesia only in 1989). Dr. White's credentials include having published 435 papers on PubMed and having written approximately fifteen books, among which are two major textbooks and five books on propofol, plus various chapters in other textbooks, also on propofol. After initial study showed propofol allowed patients to wake up sooner, he went back to the company and asked to do a follow-up study. Dr. White said, "Some people call me the father of Monitored Anesthetic Care (MAC) (anesthesia awareness) sedation." "In January of this year, Mr. Flanagan contacted me and mentioned the name Conrad Murray. I wasn't sure if I wanted to get involved in a high-profile trial involving the death of a celebrity. I was perplexed how experts determined that Murray was infusing propofol. It was not obvious to me." Dr. White met the Shafers in 1981, shortly after arrival at Stanford. They approached him about doing research. It was heard that Dr. White performed a study with animals and found that propofol directly into the stomach has no clinical effect. Regarding the paper, Dr. Shafer testified about a sleep study in China, Dr. White said "My take on the paper was different than Dr. Shafer's. The study showed that propofol was safe and effective for normalizing disturbed sleep but it's certainly not a definitive study."

=== October 28, 2011: Day 20 ===
White was back on the stand being examined by J. Michael Flanagan. It was heard that, based on the diagram showing what Dr. Murray told the police he gave to Jackson on the night in question, it would not have presented any danger at all. White said that "the dose of propofol we are talking about here is 25 mg. This is a dose that produces little anxiety, little sleepiness." It was heard that anesthesiologists are obviously trained in sedation. For non-anesthesiologists, most hospitals require certification to use sedation. White was then given a certificate to read. It was Murray's certification from Sunrise Medical Hospital approving him to administer moderate sedation. It qualifies the doctor to administer drugs to achieve moderate sedation; but he must monitor patients carefully. The certification also says the doctor is approved to rescue patients from deep sedation, manage compromised airway, and provide adequate ventilation. Flanagan and White went through simulations that Shafer put together with the variables being dosage and time administered. It was heard that there was some free lorazepam in the stomach, showing that Jackson took lorazepam orally at some point before his death. Flanagan went through different scenarios with Dr. White about what could have caused Jackson's death. Dr. White then demonstrated how to mix propofol and lidocaine inside a syringe and administered it through a saline drip and Y tube. White injected 5 mg of propofol/saline mix into a cup to show that propofol doesn't go up the IV line and propofol sticks to the plastic tubing. He said that this is certainly a very safe way to inject propofol, and it was only 25 mg. "My demonstration was probably close to what happened at the scene. You'd need a mechanism to drip the drug and hold this heavy bottle." Flanagan asked if he could envision anyone using a slit IV bag to hang the propofol bottle when there's a handle on the bottle? "No." White added: "Why would anyone go through the hassle of cutting a saline bag to put the bottle inside when bottle has a handle?" Flanagan then asked how you would mix propofol solution with saline to make it 1–1 mg/ml? "You pull the tab off the bottle, spike the top, then inject all the bottle of propofol into the saline bag, shaking the bag to make it 1-1 μg/ml."

It was heard that propofol is extensively metabolized, but some is eliminated in the urine in unchanged form. The autopsy determined an extremely small amount. There was half a liter of urine in Jackson's bladder at the time of the autopsy. It contained very little unchanged propofol. White commented, "I cannot understand a 3-hour infusion theory where there was evidence of infusion set up and elimination of drug in urine." Flanagan then asked: "Do you think it was self injection of propofol nearly 11:30a/12p did it?" "In my opinion, yes." Flanagan then asked: "Shafer said his scenario reconciled with all facts in this case. Does it reconcile with Dr. Murray's statement?" "No." "Does Dr. Shafer's theory reconcile with physical evidence at the scene or urine concentration?" "No." Dr. White said. "My theory reconciles with the evidence found at the scene and the urine concentration at autopsy." Dr. White proposed that, consistent with Murray's claim of having administered a dose of 25 mg of propofol, Michael Jackson would have woken up "after 10-15 minutes max," following which he self-injected 25 mg of propofol while Murray was out of the room. The combination of lorazepam, another sedative, midazolam, and propofol could have been potentially lethal.

=== October 31, 2011: Day 21 ===
It was heard from White that administering propofol without careful bedside monitoring could be dangerous. "Do you agree there were instances where Dr. Murray deviated from the standard of care on June 25, 2009?" "Yes." Walgren asked, "have you ever administered propofol in someone's bedroom?" "No." "Have you heard anyone else doing it?" "No." Dr. White agrees Dr. Murray deviated from the 'standard of care' of Jackson but doesn't know to what degree. "Do you disagree with Dr. Shafer's opinion that failure to keep medical records constitutes an 'egregious and unconscionable' deviation?" White doesn't know what the words egregious and unconscionable mean in this case. "Would you administer propofol to a patient without proper airway-opening equipment?" "I would certainly have means for ventilation. Means of ventilation could be an ambu bag and a mask, not necessarily other respiratory equipment." It was heard that Dr. White has received $11,000 so far for his testimony in this case. He usually charges $3,500 per day and any expenses such as airfares. He doesn't think the defense have this much so will not bill them that much. Dr. Safer testified for many days, and performed numerous simulations for both the prosecution and defense for free. "Was Dr. Murray offered money to provide Jackson's propofol?" "It is my understanding that Dr. Murray was offered money to be Jackson's personal doctor." Walgren then asked "If you injected 25 mg propofol, is it ok to walk out of the room?" "25 mg only lasts 15-30 minutes, after that I see no problem in leaving the patient's bedside." "If the patient liked to 'push' propofol themselves, would you walk out of room?" "No." Upon being asked about Murray's actions after he found Jackson, Dr. White said "I would have done things differently. I would have called for help, called 911 and initiated CPR." When being asked about Murray's delay to call 911 he stated "I would have called 911 earlier but do not believe it would have made any difference in this case." "3-5 minutes after finding him I would call 911." It was heard, "forgetting to mention propofol was a detail overlooked. Could it also be a lie?" "Yes." After Dr. White mentioned he believed that Jackson had his own stash of propofol, Walgren asked the judge to insist the witness to respond to the question only. The judge asked the jurors to leave the courtroom. Walgren asked "Do you reject that Jackson drank propofol and that caused his death?" "Yes. I speculated that oral administration may have played a role. I don't reject completely the self-administration theory. The evidence suggests that Jackson did not drink propofol." Flanagan then asked Dr. White: "If the patient died [at] noon, would it matter if help came 5 minutes later?" "Unlikely." Dr. White continued and added, "Propofol does not have a reversal treatment. The only treatment for a propofol overdose is time."

During his testimony, Dr. White was fined for contempt of court after disobeying an order by the judge to not refer to personal discussions with Murray in his testimony, instead to only reference statements from Murray's official police report. Dr. White could have been fined up to $1,000, but the judge set the fine to $250. Dr. White told the judge, "I did my best as I was admonished by you to answer the question truthfully and as completely as I could." He also said, "I apologize profusely if I disrespected you. I learned a lot from this experience." A second charge for contempt of court against Dr. White was dropped, after an online report alleged he had muttered "scumbag" as his colleague, Dr. Shafer, approached to testify.

After court adjourned, the judge told attorneys he would give them one day off so they could prepare their closing arguments. If done by Tuesday, Wednesday could be dark. The judge said he has prepared to give a full day off, which takes it to Thursday for jury instructions. He says he would not defer that. The judge asked Murray if he's going to testify. Murray replied, "I need more time to talk to my lawyers. I have not made my final decision." Judge Pastor told Murray that he will have until tomorrow morning to decide. Murray said: "It will all depend on how the case progresses." After the defense concludes with Dr. White, they plan on calling Dr. Ornellas, the person who put together the models of which Dr. White spoke. After Dr. Ornellas, the defense is prepared to rest their case. Walgren said he will call Dr. Shafer briefly as a rebuttal witness. The judge then said he expects all the evidence in the case to be concluded tomorrow. The trial was set to resume at 9:30 am with the end of the re-direct of Dr. White.

=== November 1, 2011: Day 22 ===
The redirect examination of Dr. White continues with Mr. Flanagan asking the questions about various models that Dr. White had commissioned for the defence. They talked about the level of lorazepam in Jackson's body in the models created by Dr. Shafer and Dr. White's expert. It was heard that there are many possibilities as to how the blood and urine levels got to where they were at autopsy. The models present a few different ideas and scenarios. "We can make models and adjust the time/dose to achieve the concentration of lorazepam found in femoral blood at the time of autopsy." There are great differences between different patients so the models are subject to huge population variability. Flanagan to Dr. White: "we don't know how many lorazepam pills Jackson took, do we?" "No one can be sure." Dr. White said that Dr. Shafer's scenario of a three-hour infusion does not hold up because the urine levels of propofol at autopsy are too low. Dr. White said that, while standards of care are the ideals, standards of practice are different in different situations. Some office procedures, i.e. such as procedures from hospital to hospital, might have different conditions and standards of practice if it is not possible to have the highest standard of care. Dr. White stated that 25 mg over 3-5 minute of propofol would only produce light sleepiness, possibly no sleep at all.

Murray decided not to take the stand in his defense. The defense had no more witnesses and rested their case.

Prosecution recalled Dr. Steven Shafer. It was heard that there was no suggestion Jackson died at any specific time, only the fact he died with a high level infusion of propofol. It was heard that the propofol elimination in the urine is 0.004+-0.002% of the total dose given. The excreted unchanged propofol found in the urine at autopsy was 82.5 μg. This indicates that more than 2,000 mg propofol was administered to Jackson. This rules out the hypothesis by Dr. White and indicates more propofol than Dr. Shafer's models. Dr. Shafer said that if there were such a thing as bedroom-based anesthesia, the standard guidelines would be a minimum; many more precautions would be required.

=== November 3, 2011: Day 23 ===
The jury heard instructions from the judge, both prosecution and defense closing arguments and final post-trial instructions from the judge.

== Verdict and sentencing ==
On November 7, 2011, the 24th day of the trial, Murray was found guilty of involuntary manslaughter. Judge Pastor set sentencing for November 29, and ordered Murray taken into custody without bail. On November 29, Murray was sentenced to the maximum penalty of four years of incarceration. According to Los Angeles County sheriff officials, Murray was expected to serve less than two years in the Los Angeles County Jail due to Californian prison overcrowding.

== Release ==
Murray was released on October 28, 2013, two years ahead of schedule, due to California prison overcrowding and good behavior. Murray refused to testify in Katherine Jackson's (unsuccessful) wrongful death lawsuit against his former employer, AEG Live, which argued that the concert promoter should be held responsible for Michael Jackson's death. According to the Associated Press, "Murray's medical licenses remain suspended or revoked in three states where he previously practiced medicine."

== See also ==
- Death of Michael Jackson
