= Conrad Murray =

American physician and convicted felon (born 1953)

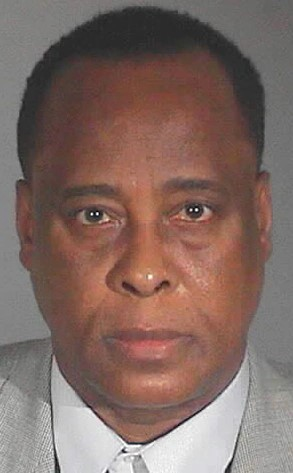
- Murray’s 2010 mugshot following his arrest
- Born: Conrad Robert Murray; February 19, 1953 (age 73); Saint Andrew Parish, Grenada, British Windward Islands
- Citizenship: Grenada (until 1960); Trinidad and Tobago (1960–1971); United States (since 1971)
- Education: Texas Southern University (BS); Meharry Medical College (MD)
- Occupation: Former personal physician of Michael Jackson
- Years active: 1990–2011
- Known for: Convicted for the death of Michael Jackson
- Spouse(s): Zufan Tesfai (m. 1984; div. 1988) Yvette Bolick Murray (formerly)
- Partner: Nicole Alvarez (2006–2011)
- Children: 7
- Status: Released on October 28, 2013
- Conviction: Involuntary manslaughter
- Penalty: 4 years imprisonment; paroled after two years

Details
- Date apprehended: February 8, 2010
- Imprisoned at: Men's Central Jail (formerly)

Conrad Robert Murray (born February 19, 1953) is a Grenadian-born American former physician who was convicted for his role in the death of American singer and dancer Michael Jackson. He was the personal doctor of Jackson on the day of the singer's death in 2009. In 2011, during People v. Murray, Murray was convicted of involuntary manslaughter in Jackson's death for having inadvertently overdosed him with the surgical anesthetic propofol, which was being improperly used as a bedtime sleep agent. Murray served just under two years out of his original four-year prison sentence. He released a memoir titled This Is It! in 2016.

== Early life ==
Conrad Robert Murray was born on February 19th, 1953, and was raised by his maternal grandparents, who were farmers in Grenada. He later joined his mother, Milta, in Trinidad and Tobago when he was seven years old. He grew up poor in Port of Spain, the capital of Trinidad and Tobago. He did not meet his father, Rawle Andrew Sr., also a physician, until he was 25. Andrew, who died in 2001, was devoted to providing medical services to the poor. Murray finished high school and worked as a volunteer elementary school teacher in Trinidad. After teaching, he worked as a customs clerk and insurance underwriter to save up for college tuition.

== Education ==
In 1973, Murray moved to Houston, Texas, where his father worked, to attend Texas Southern University, and graduated magna cum laude with a degree in pre-med and biological sciences. Murray continued his education at Meharry Medical College, in Nashville, Tennessee, the same school his father attended, and the first medical school in the Southern United States for African Americans. He began his internal medicine residency at the Mayo Clinic in Rochester, Minnesota. Murray completed residency at the Loma Linda University Medical Center in California. He then completed a cardiology fellowship at the University of Arizona.

== Career ==
Murray worked at the Sharp Memorial Hospital in San Diego as an associate director of its cardiology fellowship training program. In 1990, he opened a private practice in Las Vegas. In 2006, he founded the Acres Homes Heart and Vascular Institute in Houston.

Murray met Michael Jackson in 2006, in Las Vegas, and treated his daughter Paris when she fell ill. Jackson hired Murray to be his exclusive personal physician prior to his This Is It concert residency in July 2009. Jackson insisted that Murray be employed by his show promoter, AEG Live, for $150,000 monthly. However, AEG later claimed there was never a contract with Murray. Murray and AEG agree Murray was never paid.

His medical licenses in California and Nevada had been suspended following his arrest. Following his release from prison in 2013 for involuntary manslaughter, Murray's legal team filed petitions in Texas to have his medical license reinstated since it had been revoked earlier that year.

In 2016, Inside Edition reported Murray was "still visiting patients" in Florida, although Murray claimed he does not charge patients anything for his services and he is only "providing a consultation" without prescribing medication, and therefore he "is not breaking the law".

In 2016, Murray released a memoir, This Is It!, which detailed his experience as Michael Jackson's physician and tells of having treated Mother Teresa. Murray wrote,

However my most magnanimous and noble patient is also deceased. She was the world-renowned quintessential nun who is now a saint: Mother Theresa. I loved the way I dedicated my services to her, it was totally selfless because when I agreed to serve her, I literally had no idea then that she was widely known…

The A.V. Club called the book "literary poison with no antidote," and The Daily Telegraph said any revelations the memoir contains are "mired in several thousand words of self-aggrandising, poorly punctuated and repetitive text."

In 2022, it was reported Murray is allowed to retain his medical license after a recent review by the Nevada State Board of Medical Examiners.

In May 2023, Murray opened a medical center in San Juan, Trinidad and Tobago.

== Personal life ==
Murray is a naturalized American citizen.

By 2009, Murray had reportedly fathered seven children by six different women. He was in arrears on the mortgage for the Las Vegas home occupied by his first wife and children and owed child support to the mothers of children outside of his marriage, which he could not pay due to the amount of money he owed to Michael Jackson's family. He was married to Blanche, his second wife, whom he met at medical school, and helped pay rent for another woman, Nicole Alvarez. Murray met Alvarez at a gentlemen's club in Las Vegas when she worked as a stripper, and Alvarez gave birth to their son Che Giovanni Murray in March 2009. Another relationship, with a cocktail waitress from Houston, was also reported.

In 2016, Murray lived in a luxury condo building near Fort Lauderdale, Florida, with his dog, Sebastian, but later immigrated back to Trinidad and Tobago.

== Legal issues ==
Murray was at risk of losing his California medical license due to unpaid child support to one of his children and owed $13,000 to a California woman, Nenita Malibiran. Murray was a defendant in numerous civil lawsuits (though none for medical malpractice). By 2008, he had accumulated over $600,000 in court judgments against him for medical equipment and unpaid rent for his practices in Texas and Nevada. He also owed $71,000 for student loans at Meharry Medical College. Murray had filed for bankruptcy in 2002, in California.

=== Death of Michael Jackson ===
On June 25, 2009, Jackson died due to a lethal dose of propofol administered by Murray. Court documents released in August 2009 revealed the coroner's preliminary conclusion indicating Jackson overdosed on propofol. However, the coroner's office declined to comment on reports claiming the death was ruled a homicide.

Several offices of doctors who were believed to have treated Jackson were searched. Based on the autopsy and toxicology findings, the cause of Jackson's death was determined to be acute propofol intoxication with a contributory benzodiazepine effect. Upon review, coroners construed the manner of death as homicide, so that, eventually, the focus of the investigation shifted toward Murray. He admitted administering 25 mg of propofol intravenously, for insomnia, on the night of Jackson's death. He claimed he tried treating Jackson with other drugs and also asserted he administered propofol after Jackson insisted, according to a police affidavit.

Murray said he worried Jackson had become dependent on the drug to get to sleep and was trying to wean him from it. Though any FDA-approved drug can potentially be used off-label in a responsible manner which is medically appropriate for their patient but different from the intended use the indicated use for propofol is as anesthesia and not as a sleep aid. Therefore, appropriate use of propofol would require a hospital or clinical setting with close monitoring and under the orders of an anesthesiologist, Certified Registered Nurse Anesthetist (CRNA), critical care physician, or other medical professional who had received extensive training in the use and monitoring of anesthetics. Murray had no such specialty training.

In February 2010, Murray was formally charged with involuntary manslaughter. On September 27, 2011, Murray went on trial in Los Angeles and was convicted of involuntary manslaughter on November 7, 2011. His bail was revoked and he was remanded to custody pending his November 29 sentencing date. He received the maximum penalty of four years in prison. His Texas medical license was revoked, and his California and Nevada licenses were suspended. After serving two years, Murray was released on parole on October 28, 2013.

Jackson's father, Joe Jackson, filed a wrongful death lawsuit against Murray in 2010 but dropped it in 2012. Also in 2010, Jackson's mother, Katherine Jackson, and three children, filed a separate wrongful death suit against concert promoter AEG, claiming the company was negligent in hiring Murray; the jury decided in favor of AEG in 2013.
