= Michael Jackson =

American singer and songwriter (1958–2009)

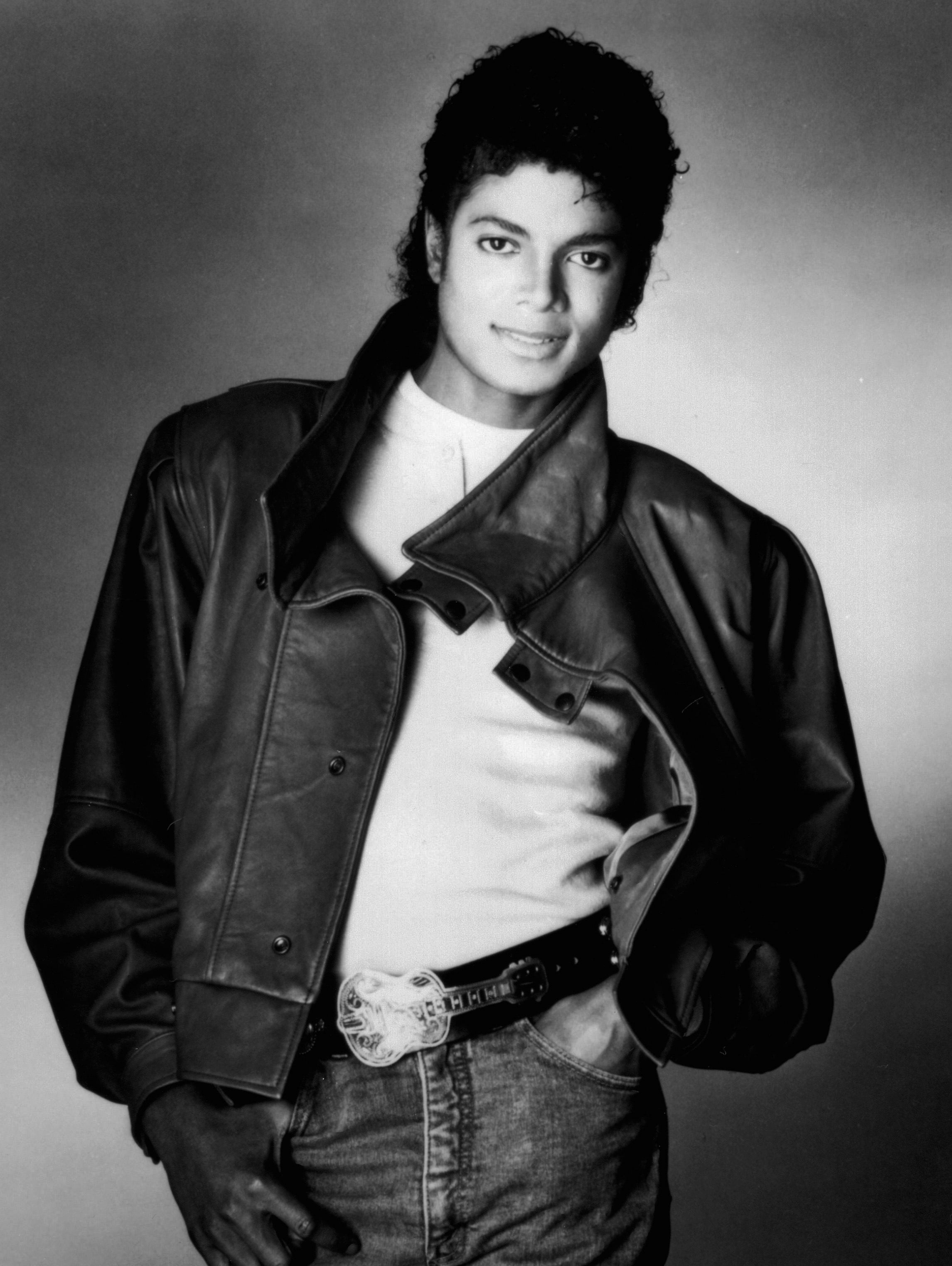
- Jackson in 1983
- Born: Michael Joseph Jackson; August 29, 1958; Gary, Indiana, US
- Died: June 25, 2009 (aged 50); Los Angeles, California, US
- Cause of death: Cardiac arrest caused by acute propofol intoxication
- Burial place: Forest Lawn Memorial Park, Glendale, California, US
- Other name: Michael Joe Jackson
- Occupations: Singer; songwriter; dancer; philanthropist
- Years active: 1964–2009
- Works: Albums; singles; songs (unreleased); videography; concerts
- Spouses: Lisa Marie Presley (m. 1994; div. 1996); Debbie Rowe (m. 1996; div. 2000)
- Children: 3, including Prince and Paris
- Parents: Joe Jackson; Katherine Jackson
- Family: Jackson
- Awards: Full list; records and achievements
- Musical career
- Genres: Pop; R&B; soul; funk; disco
- Instrument: Vocals
- Labels: Steeltown; Motown; Epic; Sony
- Publisher: Sony Music Publishing
- Formerly of: The Jackson 5
- Jackson's voice Jackson thanking President Ronald Reagan and First Lady Nancy Reagan at the White House; Recorded May 14, 1984
- Website: michaeljackson.com

Michael Joseph Jackson (August 29, 1958 – June 25, 2009) was an American singer, songwriter, dancer, and philanthropist. Dubbed the "King of Pop", he is widely regarded as one of the most significant cultural figures of the 20th century. His musical achievements broke American racial barriers and made him a dominant figure worldwide. Through his songs, music videos, concerts, and fashion, he transformed visual performance in popular music, popularizing street dance moves such as the moonwalk, the robot, and the anti-gravity lean. Jackson is often deemed the greatest entertainer of all time. (Note: Attributed to multiple sources:)

The eighth of ten children in the Jackson family, Jackson made his public debut at age six as the lead singer of the Jackson 5. He rose to solo stardom with Off the Wall (1979) and achieved unprecedented global success with Thriller (1982), which became the best-selling album in history. The music videos for "Thriller", "Beat It", and "Billie Jean" redefined the medium. Bad (1987) was the first album to produce five US Billboard Hot 100 number-one singles: "I Just Can't Stop Loving You", "Bad", "The Way You Make Me Feel", "Man in the Mirror", and "Dirty Diana". Jackson engaged with a multitude of genres on the commercial blockbuster Dangerous (1991). HIStory (1995) was also successful. Jackson's final album, Invincible (2001), is the most expensive ever made.

From the mid-1980s, Jackson came under public scrutiny for his relationships, lifestyle, and changing appearance. He was accused of sexually abusing a child in 1993 and settled out of court in 1994. In 2005, he was tried and acquitted on other child sexual abuse charges. While preparing for This Is It, a series of comeback concerts, he died in 2009 from an overdose of propofol administered by his personal physician, Conrad Murray. His death caused unprecedented surges in internet traffic and a spike in music sales. Posthumous Jackson releases include the documentary Michael Jackson's This Is It (2009) and the albums Michael (2010) and Xscape (2014). The 2019 documentary Leaving Neverland detailed further child sexual abuse allegations against Jackson.

Jackson is one of the best-selling music artists of all time, with estimated sales of more than 500 million records worldwide as a solo artist. (Note: The estimates of Jackson's sales often vary up to 1 billion records worldwide.) He is also one of three musicians, alongside Paul McCartney and Phil Collins, to have sold more than 100 million records both as a solo artist and as a principal member of a band. He scored 13 number-one singles on the Billboard Hot 100 and is the only artist to have a US top-ten single in six decades. His accolades include 13 Grammy Awards, the Grammy Legend Award, the Grammy Lifetime Achievement Award, 26 American Music Awards, 12 World Music Awards, 8 MTV Video Music Awards, 6 Brit Awards, and 3 US presidential honors. He was inducted into the Rock and Roll Hall of Fame twice, as well as the Songwriters Hall of Fame and the Dance Hall of Fame. Having donated an estimated $500 million, Jackson is credited with setting a standard for celebrity charity. The 2026 film Michael is the highest-grossing biographical film of all time, while Jackson's music catalog remains the highest-selling for any solo musician.

== Life and career ==
=== Early life and the Jackson 5 (1958–1975) ===
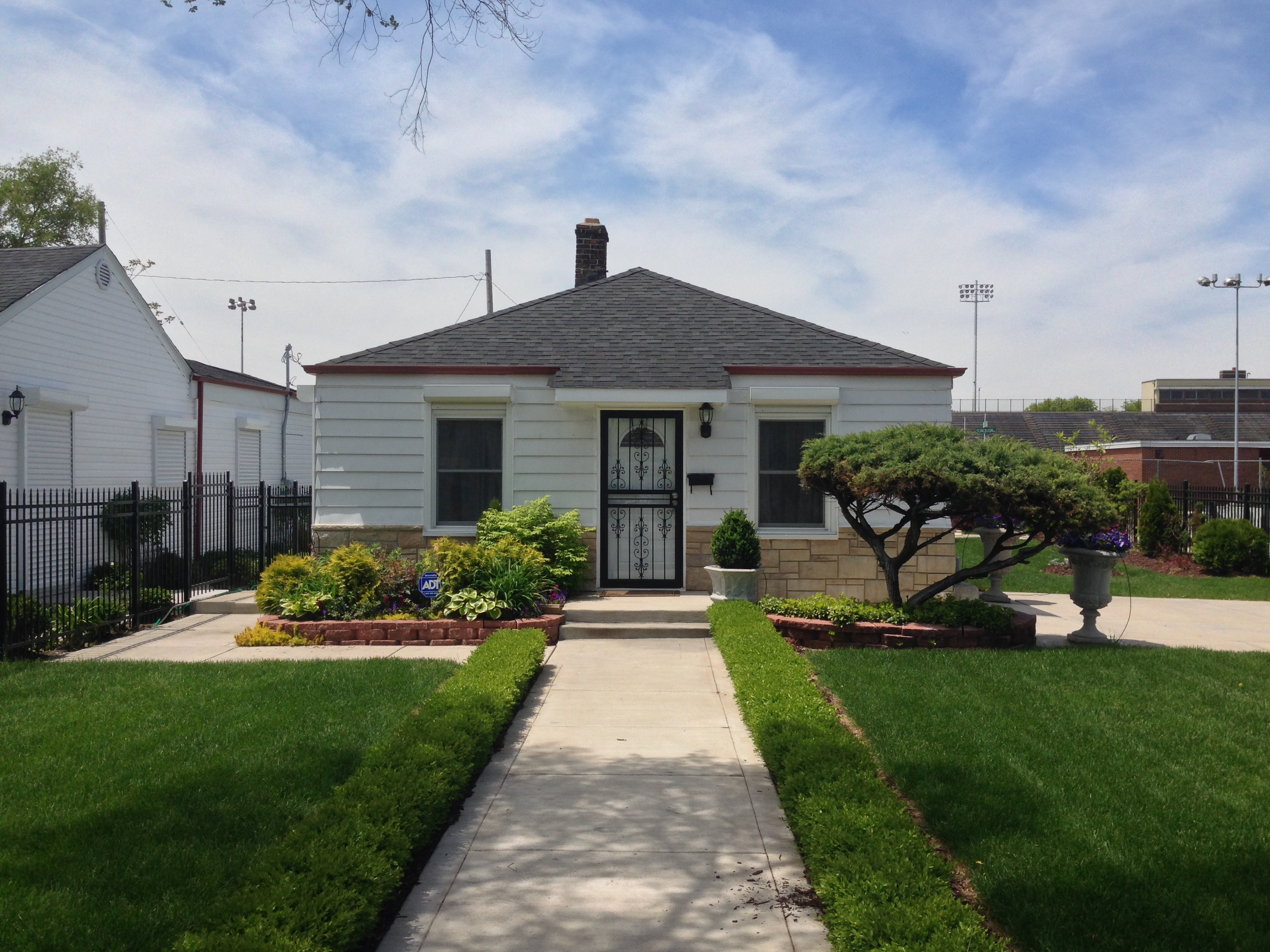
Jackson's childhood home in Gary, Indiana, as seen in 2014

Michael Joseph Jackson was born on August 29, 1958, at St Mary's Mercy Hospital, in Gary, Indiana. He was the eighth of ten children in the Jackson family, an African-American working-class household living in a two-bedroom home on Jackson Street. His mother, Katherine Jackson (née Scruse), a Jehovah's Witness, played clarinet, cello, and piano; she aspired to be a country-and-western performer, and worked part-time at Sears. His father, Joe Jackson, was a former boxer and a crane operator at US Steel, who also played guitar for the local rhythm and blues group the Falcons. Through his father, Michael had Native American (Choctaw) ancestry; his great-grandfather, Israel Nero Jackson, utilized and sold traditional Indigenous herbal medicine, a practice passed down from his father, July "Jack" Gale, an US Army scout who had married a Black slave named Gina before the Civil War. Michael had three sisters—Rebbie, La Toya, and Janet—and five brothers Jackie, Tito, Jermaine, Marlon, and Randy. A sixth brother, Brandon, Marlon's twin, died shortly after birth.

Michael and Marlon joined the Jackson Brothers in 1964, a band their father formed that already included Jackie, Tito, and Jermaine. They initially performed as backup musicians, playing congas and tambourine. Michael later said that his father physically and emotionally abused him, recalling that during rehearsals Joe often sat with a belt in hand, ready to punish mistakes. Joe acknowledged that he regularly whipped him. Jackie, Tito, Jermaine, and Marlon denied that their father was abusive, saying the whippings—felt more intensely by Michael because he was younger—kept the group disciplined. Michael described his youth as lonely.

By late 1965, Michael began sharing lead vocals with Jermaine, and the group's name was changed to the Jackson 5. They won a talent show that year in which Michael danced to Robert Parker's "Barefootin'" and sang the Temptations' "My Girl". From 1966 to 1968, the Jackson 5 toured throughout the Midwest, performing frequently on the Chitlin' Circuit as an opening act for artists such as Sam & Dave, the O'Jays, Gladys Knight, and Etta James. They also performed in clubs and cocktail lounges that featured striptease shows, as well as at local auditoriums and high school dances. In August 1967, while touring the East Coast, they won a weekly amateur night competition at the Apollo Theater in Harlem.

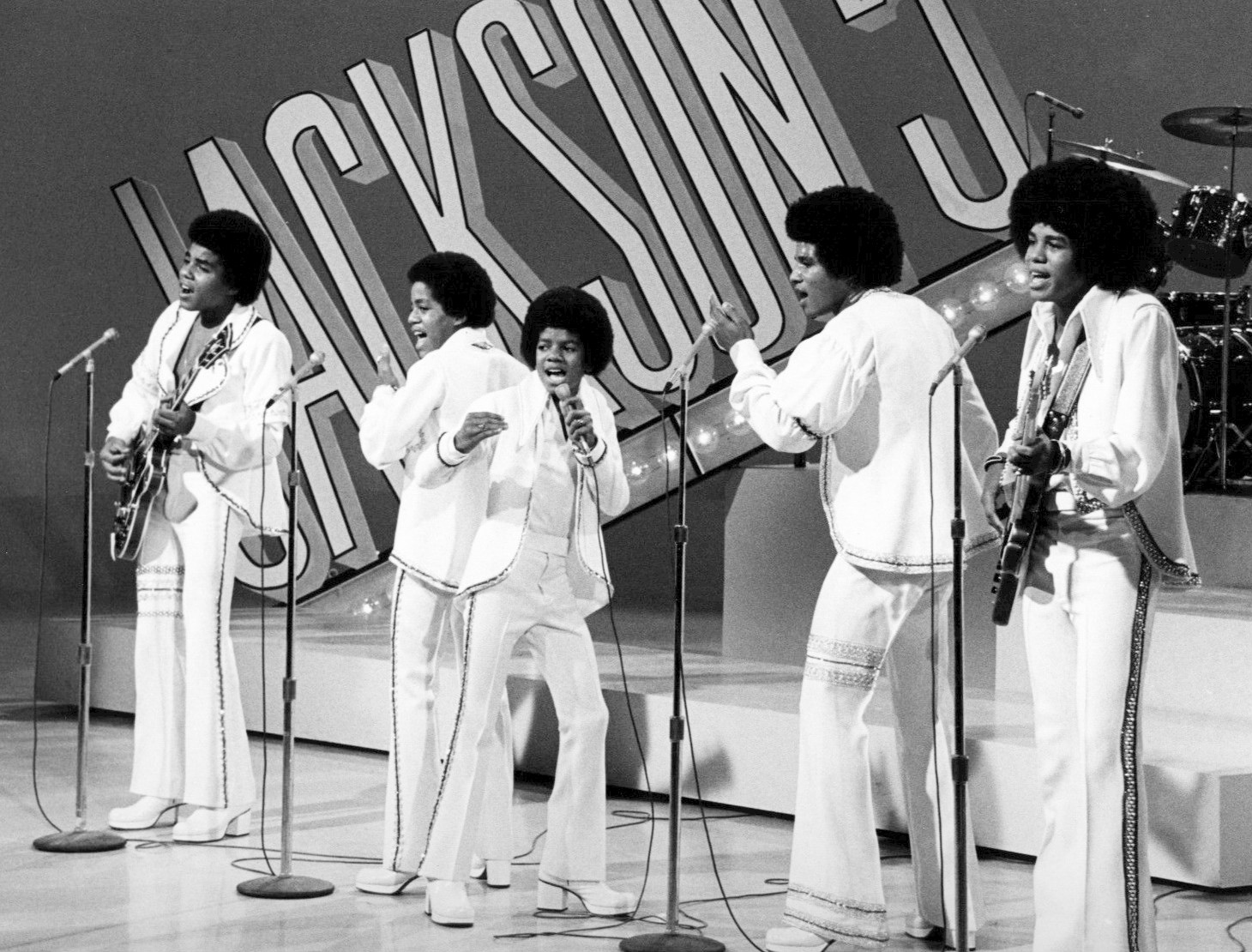
Jackson (center) as a member of the Jackson 5 in 1972. The group were among the first African American performers to attain a large following.

The Jackson 5 recorded several songs for the Gary-based label Steeltown Records, releasing their first single, "Big Boy", in 1968. Bobby Taylor of Bobby Taylor & the Vancouvers brought the group to Motown after they opened for him at Chicago's Regal Theater that year. Taylor produced some of their early Motown recordings, including a version of "Who's Lovin' You". After signing with Motown, the Jackson family relocated to Los Angeles. In 1969, Motown executives decided that Diana Ross would introduce the Jackson 5 to the public—partly to support her emerging television career—launching what was considered Motown's final product of its "production line". The group made its first television appearance that year at the Miss Black America pageant, performing a cover of "It's Your Thing". Rolling Stone later described the young Michael as "a prodigy" with "overwhelming musical gifts" who quickly became the group's main attraction and lead singer.

In January 1970, "I Want You Back" became the Jackson 5's first single to reach number one on the Billboard Hot 100, remaining at the top for four weeks. Three additional Motown singles—"ABC", "The Love You Save", and "I'll Be There"—also reached number one. In May 1971, the Jackson family moved into a large home on Hayvenhurst Avenue, a 2-acre (0.81 ha) estate in Encino, California. During this period, Michael developed from a child performer into a teen idol. Between 1972 and 1975, he released four solo studio albums with Motown: Got to Be There (1972), Ben (1972), Music & Me (1973), and Forever, Michael (1975). "Got to Be There" and "Ben", the title tracks from his first two solo albums, sold well as singles, as did his cover of Bobby Day's "Rockin' Robin".

Michael remained involved with the Jackson 5. The group was later described as "a cutting-edge example of black crossover artists". They grew frustrated with Motown's refusal to grant them creative input. Michael's performance of their top five single "Dancing Machine" on Soul Train helped popularize the robot dance.

=== Move to Epic and Off the Wall (1975–1981) ===
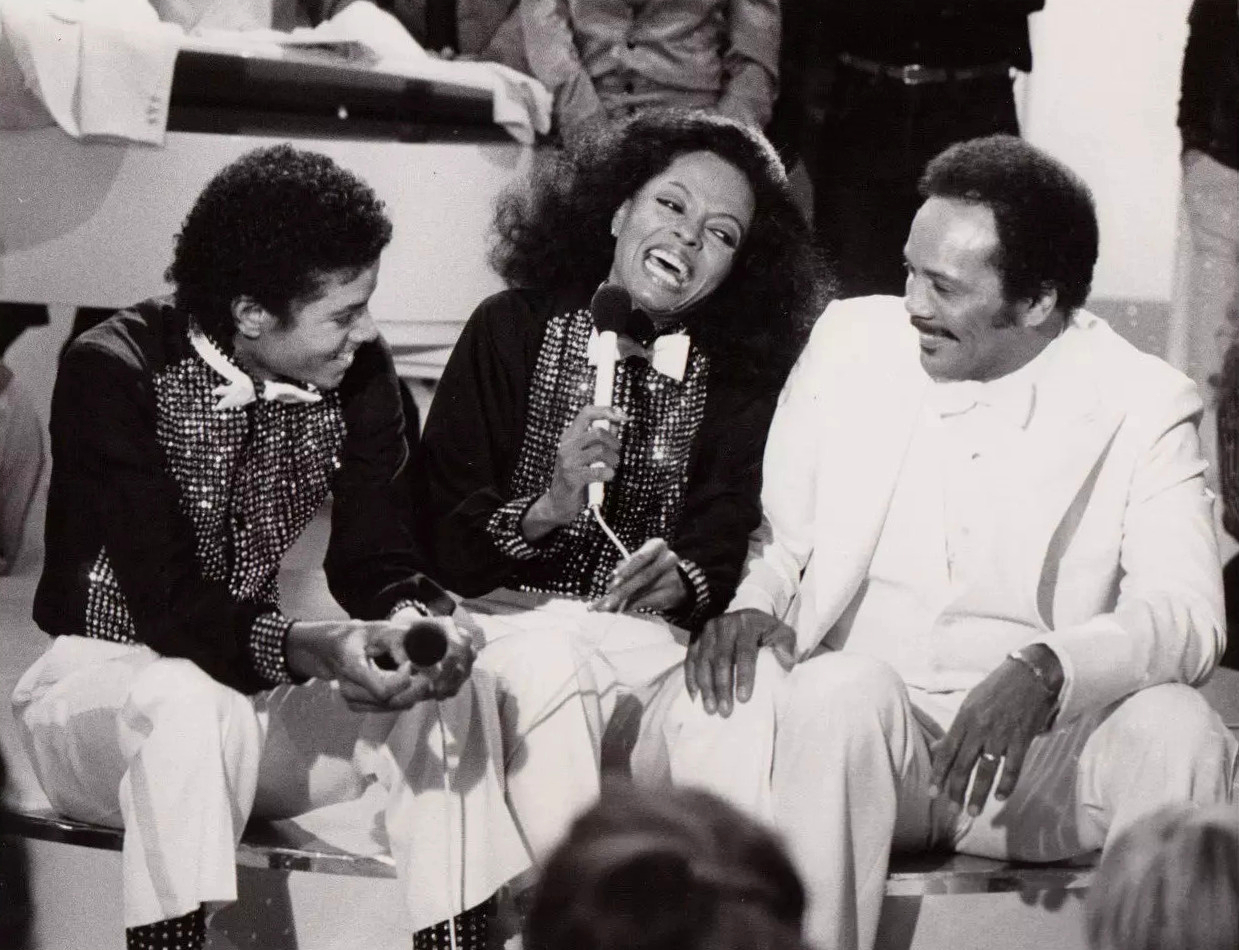
Jackson (left) and Quincy Jones (right) appear with Diana Ross on her upcoming special, Diana, in March 1981.

The Jackson 5 left Motown in 1975, signing with Epic Records and renaming themselves the Jacksons. Their younger brother Randy joined the band around this time, while Jermaine remained with Motown to pursue a solo career. The Jacksons continued to tour internationally and released six more albums between 1976 and 1984. Michael, the group's main songwriter during this period, wrote songs such as "Shake Your Body (Down to the Ground)" (1978), "This Place Hotel" (1980), and "Can You Feel It" (1980).

In 1977, Jackson moved to New York City to star as the Scarecrow in The Wiz, a musical film directed by Sidney Lumet and featuring Diana Ross, Nipsey Russell, and Ted Ross. The film was a box-office failure. Its score was arranged by Quincy Jones, who later produced three of Jackson's solo albums. During his time in New York, Jackson frequented the Studio 54 nightclub, where he heard early hip-hop; this influenced his beatboxing on later tracks such as "Working Day and Night".

Jackson's fifth solo album and first as an adult, Off the Wall (1979), established him as a solo performer and marked his transition from the bubblegum pop of his youth to more complex sounds. The album produced four top-10 entries in the US: "Off the Wall", "She's Out of My Life", and the chart-topping hits "Don't Stop 'Til You Get Enough" and "Rock with You". Off the Wall reached number three on the Billboard 200 and sold more than 20 million copies worldwide. Jackson won the Grammy Award for Best Male R&B Vocal Performance for 1979 with "Don't Stop 'Til You Get Enough". At the American Music Awards during the early 1980s, he won Favorite Soul/R&B Single for "Don't Stop 'Til You Get Enough", two consecutive awards for Favorite Soul/R&B Album, and Favorite Soul/R&B Male Artist. In 1981, he again won the American Music Awards for Favorite Soul/R&B Album and Favorite Soul/R&B Male Artist.

Jackson felt that Off the Wall should have had a greater influence and was determined to exceed expectations with his next release. In 1980, he secured the highest royalty rate in the music industry: 37 percent of wholesale album profit.

=== Thriller, Motown 25: Yesterday, Today, Forever and Pepsi incident (1981–1984) ===
Jackson demonstrating the moonwalk on the 1983 television special Motown 25: Yesterday, Today, Forever, which helped popularize the move

From 1981 to 1983, Jackson recorded demos of "State of Shock", "Victory" and "There Must Be More to Life Than This" with Queen's lead singer Freddie Mercury for a planned album duet. The project was never completed; "State of Shock" was later recorded with Mick Jagger for the Jacksons' album Victory (1984), and "There Must Be More to Life Than This" was released posthumously in 2014. In 1982, Jackson contributed "Someone in the Dark" to the audiobook for the film E.T. the Extra-Terrestrial.

Jackson's sixth studio album, Thriller, was released on November 29, 1982. It was the best-selling album worldwide in 1983 and eventually became the best-selling album of all time in the US and globally, with an estimated 70 million copies sold. It topped the Billboard 200 for 37 weeks and remained in the chart's top 10 for 80 consecutive weeks. Thriller became the first album to generate seven top-ten singles on the Billboard Hot 100, including the number-one hits "Billie Jean" and "Beat It".

On March 25, 1983, Jackson reunited with his brothers for Motown 25: Yesterday, Today, Forever, an NBC television special that aired on May 16 to an estimated audience of 47 million. Jackson's solo performance of "Billie Jean" earned him his first Emmy Award nomination. Wearing a rhinestone-studded glove, he debuted the moonwalk—taught to him three years earlier by Jeffrey Daniel—which became his signature dance move. Jackson had initially declined the invitation, believing he had been doing too much television, but agreed to perform at the request of Motown founder Berry Gordy in exchange for a solo spot. His performance received widespread acclaim: Rolling Stone's Mikal Gilmore called it "extraordinary", and The New York Times critic Anna Kisselgoff praised the timing and technique of his dancing, while Gordy said he was "mesmerized".

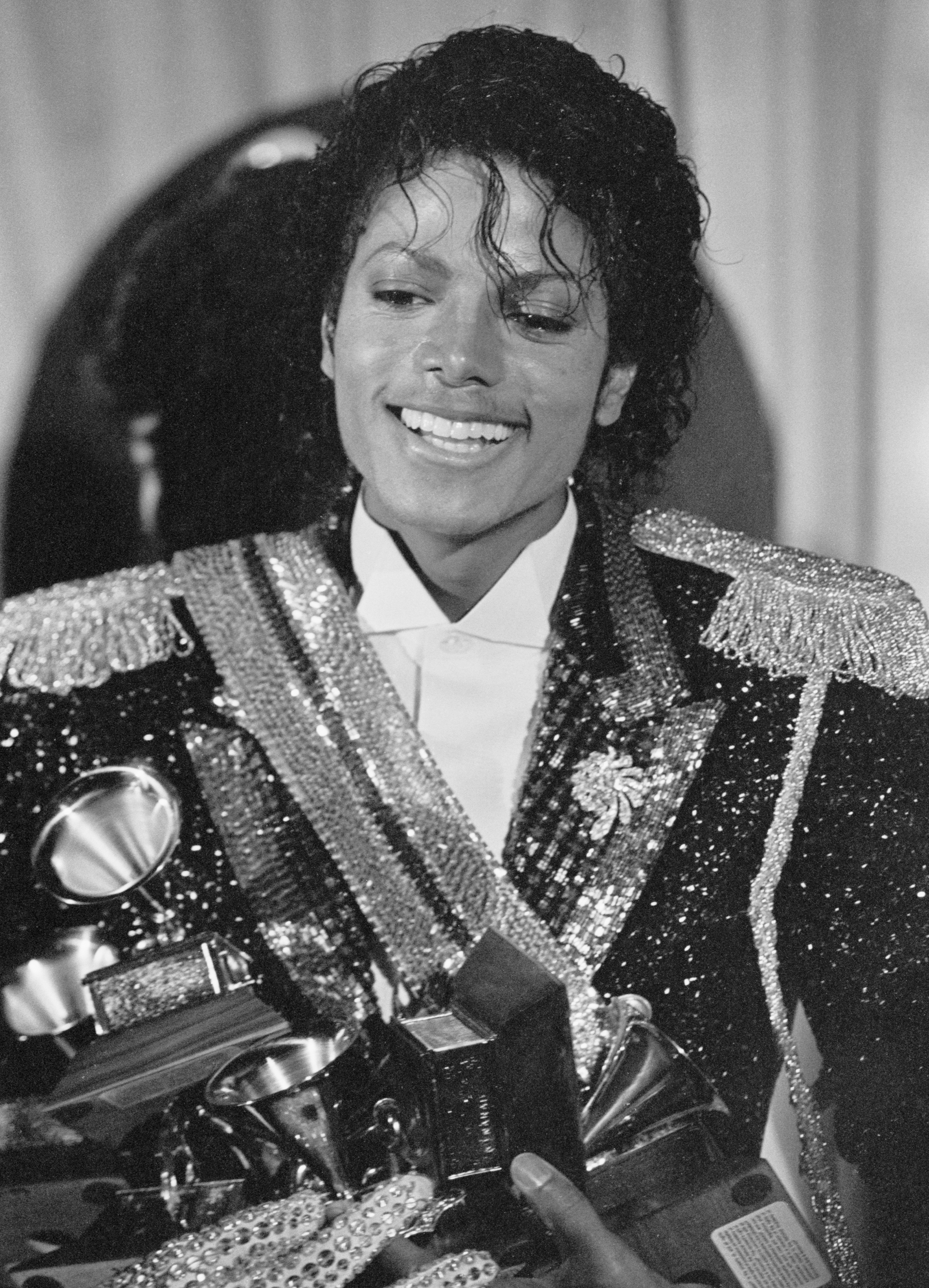
Jackson at the 26th Grammy Awards, where he won eight awards, breaking the record for the most wins in a single night

At the 26th Annual Grammy Awards, Jackson received 12 nominations—the most in a single night at the time (later tied with Babyface)—and won eight awards, breaking the record for the most wins in a single night (later tied by Santana). Thriller received 13 nominations, the most for any album, and won eight awards, including Best Engineered Recording (Non-Classical) for Bruce Swedien's work. Jackson won seven awards related to the album, including Album of the Year for Thriller and Record of the Year for "Beat It", and also won an award for the E.T. the Extra-Terrestrial storybook. At the 11th Annual American Music Awards, Jackson won another eight awards and became the youngest artist to receive the Award of Merit. He also won Favorite Male Artist, Favorite Soul/R&B Artist, and Favorite Pop/Rock Artist. "Beat It" won Favorite Soul/R&B Video, Favorite Pop/Rock Video, and Favorite Pop/Rock Single. The album won Favorite Soul/R&B Album and Favorite Pop/Rock Album. Thriller's sales doubled after the release of an extended music video for its title track, which features Jackson dancing with a group of zombies.

The success transformed Jackson into a dominant force in global pop culture, and the album "conquered racial divides". He had the highest royalty rate in the music industry at that point, earning about $2 for every album sold (equivalent to $6 in 2025), and was making record-breaking profits. In the same year, The Making of Michael Jackson's Thriller, a documentary about the music video, won a Grammy for Best Music Video (Longform). Time described Jackson's influence at the time as "star of records, radio, rock video. A one-man rescue team for the music business. A songwriter who sets the beat for a decade. A dancer with the fanciest feet on the street. A singer who cuts across all boundaries of taste and style and color too." The New York Times wrote, "in the world of pop music, there is Michael Jackson and there is everybody else".

Jackson and his brothers partnered with PepsiCo during November 1983 for a $5 million promotional deal, setting a new record for a celebrity endorsement (equivalent to $16.2 million in 2025). The first Pepsi campaign, which ran in the US from 1983 to 1984 and launched the company's "New Generation" theme, included tour sponsorship, public relations events, and in-store displays. Jackson helped create the advertisement and suggested using his song "Billie Jean", with revised lyrics, as its jingle.

On January 27, 1984, Michael and other members of the Jacksons filmed a Pepsi commercial at the Shrine Auditorium in Los Angeles, overseen by Phil Dusenberry, a BBDO ad agency executive, and Alan Pottasch, Pepsi's Worldwide Creative Director. During a simulated concert before a full audience, pyrotechnics accidentally set Jackson's hair on fire, causing second-degree burns to his scalp. He underwent treatment to conceal the scars and had his third rhinoplasty shortly afterward. Pepsi settled out of court, and Jackson donated the $1.5 million settlement (equivalent to $4.6 million in 2025) to the Brotman Medical Center in Culver City, California; its now-closed Michael Jackson Burn Center was named in his honor. Jackson signed a second agreement with Pepsi in the late 1980s for $10 million (equivalent to $28.3 million in 2025). The second campaign covered 20 countries and provided financial support for Jackson's Bad album and 1987–1988 world tour. Jackson also had endorsements and advertising deals with companies such as LA Gear, Suzuki, and Sony, but none were as significant as his deals with Pepsi.

The Victory Tour of 1984 headlined the Jacksons and showcased Jackson's new solo material to more than two million Americans. It was the last tour he performed with his brothers. Following controversy over the concert's ticket sales, Jackson donated his share of the proceeds—estimated at $3 to 5 million—to charity. During the final concert of the Victory Tour at the Dodger Stadium in Los Angeles, Jackson announced his split from the Jacksons during "Shake Your Body".

=== "We Are the World" and other commercial activities (1985) ===
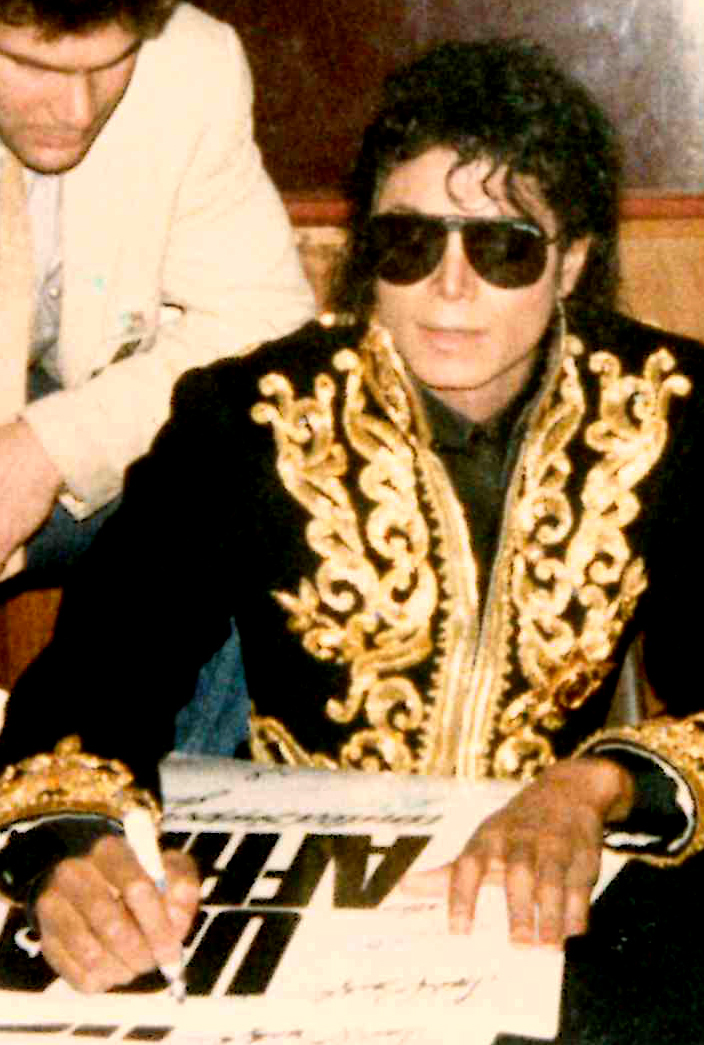
Jackson signing a "We Are the World" poster in 1985

With Lionel Richie, Jackson co-wrote the charity single "We Are the World" (1985), which raised money for the poor in the US and Africa. It earned $63 million (equivalent to $189 million in 2025), and became one of the best-selling singles of all time, with 20 million copies sold. It won four Grammy Awards in 1985, including Song of the Year for Jackson and Richie. Jackson, Jones, and promoter Ken Kragen received special awards for their roles in the song's creation.

Jackson collaborated with Paul McCartney in the early 1980s and learned that McCartney was making $40 million a year from owning the rights to other artists' songs. By 1983, Jackson had begun buying publishing rights to others' songs, but he was selective with his acquisitions, bidding on only a few of the many catalogs offered to him. Jackson's early purchases of music catalogs and song copyrights, such as the Sly Stone collection, included "Everyday People" (1968), Len Barry's "1-2-3" (1965), and Dion DiMucci's "The Wanderer" (1961) and "Runaround Sue" (1961). In 1984, Robert Holmes à Court announced he was selling the ATV Music Publishing catalog, which comprised the publishing rights to nearly 4,000 songs, including most of the Beatles's material. In 1981, McCartney had been offered the catalog for £20 million ($40 million) (equivalent to $142 million in 2025). Jackson submitted a bid of $46 million (equivalent to $143 million in 2025) on November 20, 1984. When Jackson and McCartney were unable to make a joint purchase, McCartney did not want to be the sole owner of the Beatles's songs and did not pursue an offer on his own. Jackson's agents were unable to reach a deal, and in May 1985 they left negotiations after spending more than $1 million and four months on due diligence.

In June 1985, Jackson and Branca learned that Charles Koppelman's and Martin Bandier's The Entertainment Company had made a tentative offer to buy ATV Music for $50 million. In early August, Holmes à Court contacted Jackson and talks resumed. Jackson's increased bid of $47.5 million (equivalent to $142 million in 2025) was accepted because he could close the deal more quickly, having already completed due diligence. Jackson agreed to visit Holmes à Court in Australia, where he would appear on the Channel Seven Perth Telethon. His purchase of ATV Music was finalized on August 10, 1985.

=== Increased tabloid speculation (1986–1987) ===
Jackson's skin had been medium-brown during his youth, but from the mid-1980s it gradually became paler. The change drew widespread media coverage, including speculation that he had been bleaching his skin. His dermatologist, Arnold Klein, said he observed in 1983 that Jackson had vitiligo, a condition characterized by patches of skin losing their pigment. He also identified discoid lupus erythematosus in Jackson. Klein diagnosed Jackson with lupus that year and with vitiligo in 1986. Vitiligo's drastic effects on the body can cause psychological distress. Jackson used fair-colored makeup and possibly skin-bleaching prescription creams to cover the uneven blotches caused by the illness. The creams would depigment the blotches, and with makeup he could appear very pale. Jackson said he had not purposely bleached his skin and could not control his vitiligo, adding, "When people make up stories that I don't want to be who I am, it hurts me." He became friends with Klein and Klein's assistant, Debbie Rowe. Rowe later became Jackson's second wife and the mother of his first two children.

Jackson discussed within his 1988 autobiography and a 1993 interview having only two rhinoplasty surgeries and a cleft chin surgery. He mentioned losing weight in the early 1980s because of his dietary change to achieve a dancer's body. Witnesses reported him often being dizzy and speculated he was suffering from anorexia nervosa. Periods of weight loss became a recurring problem later in his life. After Jackson died, his mother talked about him first turning to cosmetic procedures to address his vitiligo and avoid looking like a "spotted cow". She said there were more than the two cosmetic surgeries he claimed, and speculated that her son had become addicted to them.

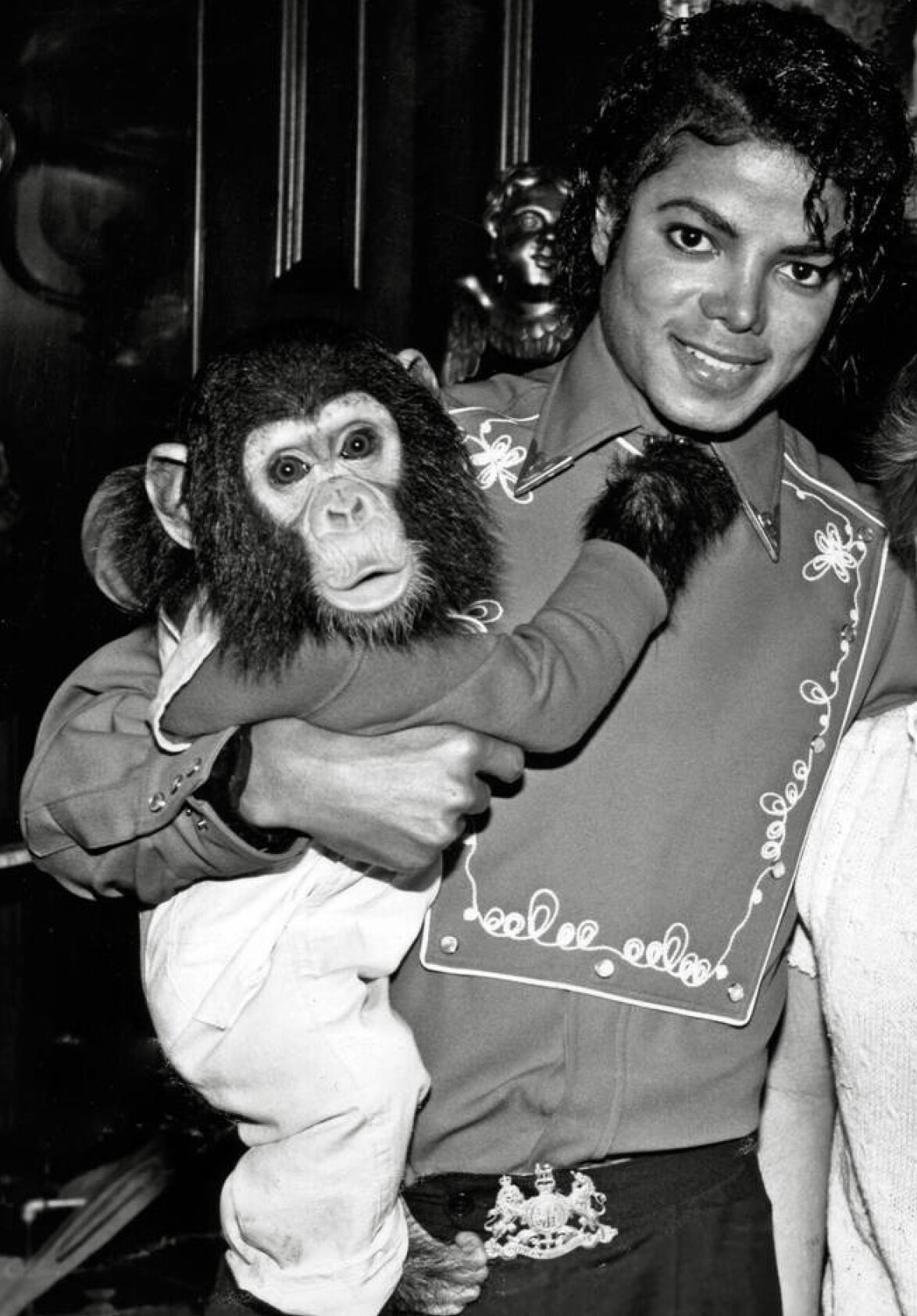
Jackson with his pet chimpanzee Bubbles in 1986

It was reported during 1986 that Jackson slept in a hyperbaric chamber to slow aging. He denied the story, though was alleged to have leaked an image of himself sleeping in a glass chamber. Jackson said it was a promotional shot from an upcoming space opera featuring him, Captain EO, to The National Enquirer. It was also reported that he took estrogen injections to keep his voice high and facial hair sparse, proposed to Elizabeth Taylor and possibly kept a shrine to her, and had cosmetic surgery on his eyes. Jackson's manager Frank DiLeo denied all of these claims except for having a chamber. DiLeo added, "I don't know if he sleeps in it. I'm not for it. But Michael thinks it's something that's probably healthy for him. He's a bit of a health fanatic."

When Jackson took his pet chimpanzee Bubbles on tour in Japan, the media portrayed him as an aspiring Disney cartoon character who befriended animals. It was also reported that Jackson had offered to buy the bones of Joseph Merrick (the "Elephant Man"). In June 1987, the Chicago Tribune reported Jackson's publicist bidding $1 million for the skeleton from the London Hospital Medical College on his behalf. The college maintained the skeleton was not for sale. DiLeo said Jackson had an "absorbing interest" in Merrick, "purely based on his awareness of the ethical, medical and historical significance".

Jackson worked with George Lucas and Francis Ford Coppola on a 17-minute, $30 million 3D film, Captain EO, which ran from 1986 at Disneyland and Epcot, and later at Tokyo Disneyland and Euro Disneyland. After being removed in the late 1990s, it returned to the theme park for several years after Jackson's death. As a Jehovah's Witness, Jackson would evangelize door-to-door while wearing a disguise. In 1987, Ebony reported that Jackson had disassociated himself from the Jehovah's Witnesses. Katherine Jackson said this might have been because some Witnesses strongly opposed the Thriller video, which Michael denounced in a Witness publication in 1984. While former members are usually shunned by their families, Jackson's mother remained in contact with him. In 2001, Jackson told an interviewer he was still a Jehovah's Witness.

=== Bad, autobiography and Neverland (1987–1990) ===
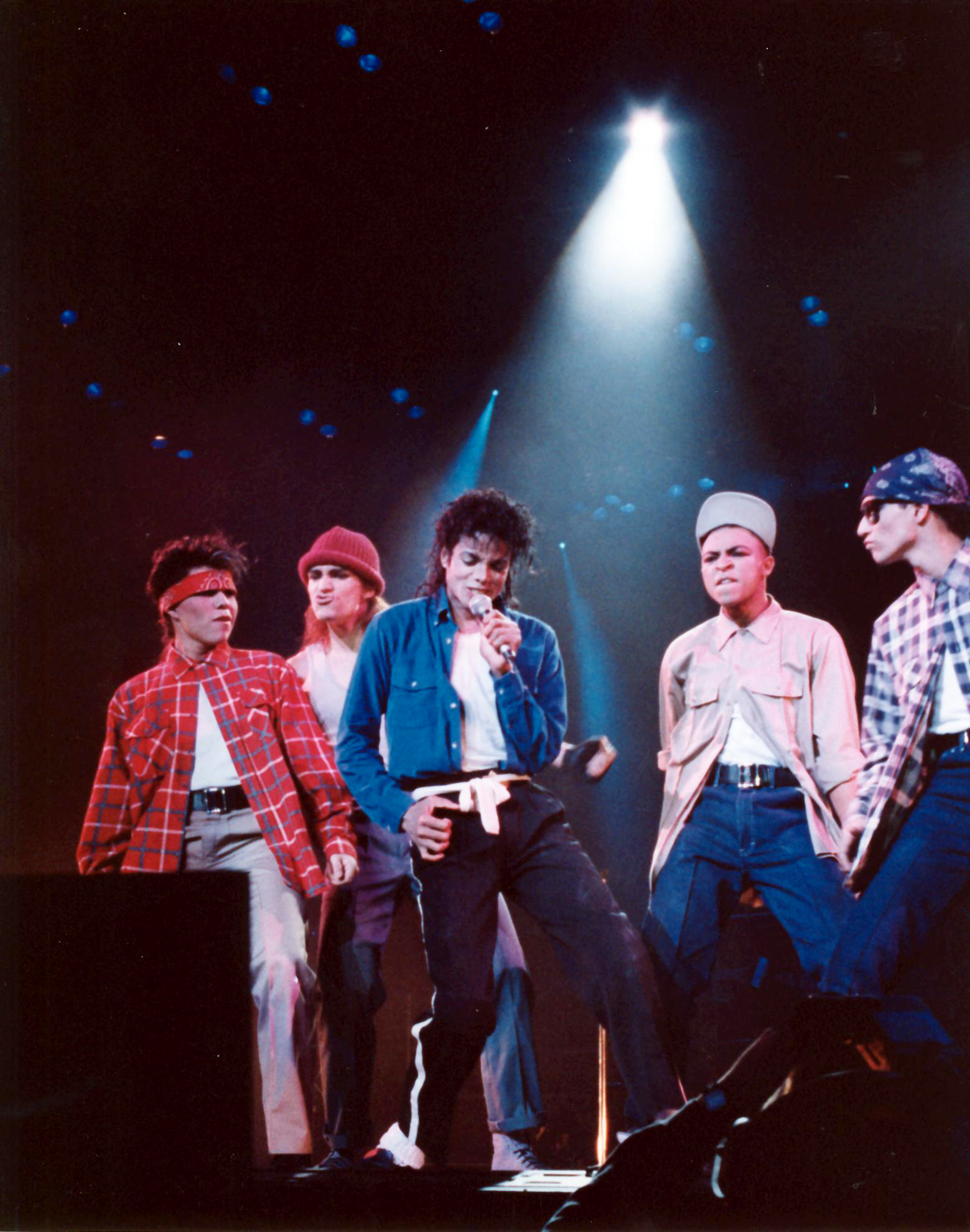
Jackson (center) performing a dance sequence to "The Way You Make Me Feel" at the Bad World Tour in 1988

Jackson released his highly anticipated seventh studio album, Bad, on August 31, 1987. Bad sold more than 2.25 million copies in its first week in the US, debuting at number one on the Billboard 200, where it remained for six weeks. It became the first album to produce five US number-one singles: "I Just Can't Stop Loving You", "Bad", "The Way You Make Me Feel", "Man in the Mirror", and "Dirty Diana". "Smooth Criminal" reached number seven.

Bad won the 1988 Grammy for Best Engineered Recording—Non Classical and the 1990 Grammy Award for Best Music Video, Short Form for "Leave Me Alone". Jackson received an Award of Achievement at the American Music Awards in 1989 after Bad generated five number-one singles, became the first album to top the charts in 25 countries, and was the best-selling album worldwide in 1987 and 1988. The Bad tour ran from September 12, 1987, to January 27, 1989. In Japan, it had 14 sellouts and drew 570,000 people, nearly tripling the previous record for a single tour. The 504,000 people who attended seven sold-out shows at Wembley Stadium set a new Guinness world record. Bad cemented Jackson's status as a dominant music force; the album has sold more than 35 million copies worldwide, placing it among the best-selling albums of all time.

In 1988, Jackson released his autobiography, Moonwalk, with input from Stephen Davis and Jacqueline Kennedy Onassis. It sold 200,000 copies, and reached the top of The New York Times Best Seller list. Jackson discussed his childhood, the Jackson 5, and the abuse he experienced from his father. He attributed his changing facial appearance to three plastic surgeries, puberty, weight loss, a strict vegetarian diet, a change in hairstyle, and stage lighting. On June 28, 1988, during the Bad World Tour, Jackson was presented with the Grand Vermeil Medal of the City of Paris by Mayor Jacques Chirac. On July 20, he became the first commoner in history to enter London's Guildhall through the building's Royal Entrance. In October, Jackson released the film Moonwalker, comprising live footage, music videos and narrative sequences Jackson and Joe Pesci. In the US, it was released direct-to-video and became the best-selling music videocassette in history. It was certified eight times platinum.

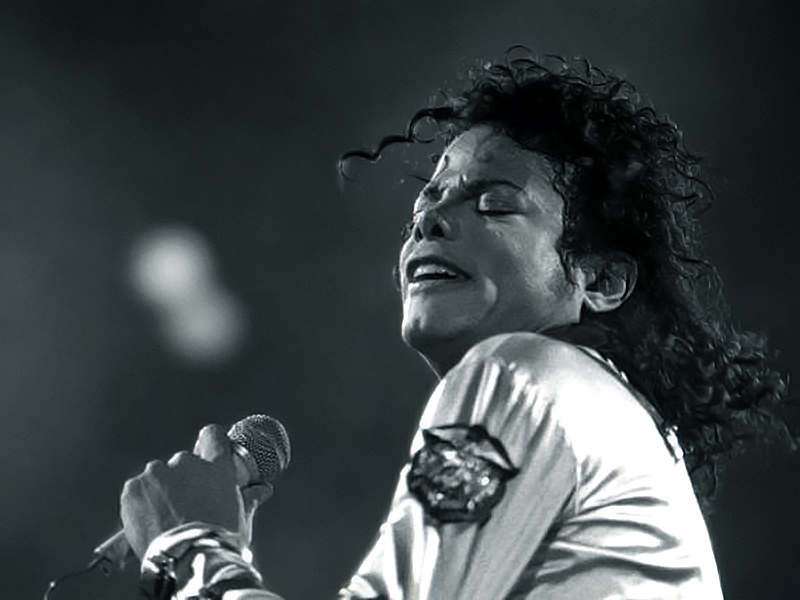
Jackson performing in Vienna in July 1988

In March 1988, Jackson purchased 2,700 acres (11 km^{2}) of land near Santa Ynez, California, to build a home, Neverland Ranch, at a cost of $17 million (equivalent to $46 million in 2025). He installed a Ferris wheel, a carousel, a movie theater, and a zoo. A security staff of 40 patrolled the grounds. Shortly afterward, Jackson appeared in the first Western television advertisement broadcast in the Soviet Union. Around this time, Jackson became known as the "King of Pop", a nickname embraced by his publicists. When Elizabeth Taylor presented him with the Soul Train Heritage Award in 1989, she called him "the true king of pop, rock and soul". President George H. W. Bush designated him the White House's "Artist of the Decade". At the 38th BMI Awards in 1990, Jackson became the first person to be honored with an award named after its recipient. From 1985 to 1990, Jackson donated $455,000 to the United Negro College Fund, and all profits from his single "Man in the Mirror" went to charity. His performance of "You Were There" at Sammy Davis Jr.'s 60th birthday celebration earned Jackson a second Emmy nomination. Jackson was the best-selling artist of the 1980s.

=== Dangerous and public social work (1991–1993) ===
In March 1991, Jackson renewed his contract with Sony for $65 million (equivalent to $154 million in 2025), a record-breaking deal at the time. He released his eighth studio album, Dangerous, on November 21, 1991, co-produced with Teddy Riley. It was certified eight times platinum in the US and had sold 32 million copies worldwide by 2018. In the US, the first single, "Black or White", was the album's highest-charting song; it was number one on the Billboard Hot 100 for seven weeks and achieved similar chart success worldwide. The second single, "Remember the Time" peaked at number three on the Billboard Hot 100. At the end of 1992, Dangerous was the best-selling album of the year worldwide, and "Black or White" the best-selling single of the year worldwide at the Billboard Music Awards. In 1993, he performed "Remember the Time" at the Soul Train Music Awards while seated, saying he had twisted his ankle during dance rehearsals. In the UK, "Heal the World" reached number two on the charts in 1992.

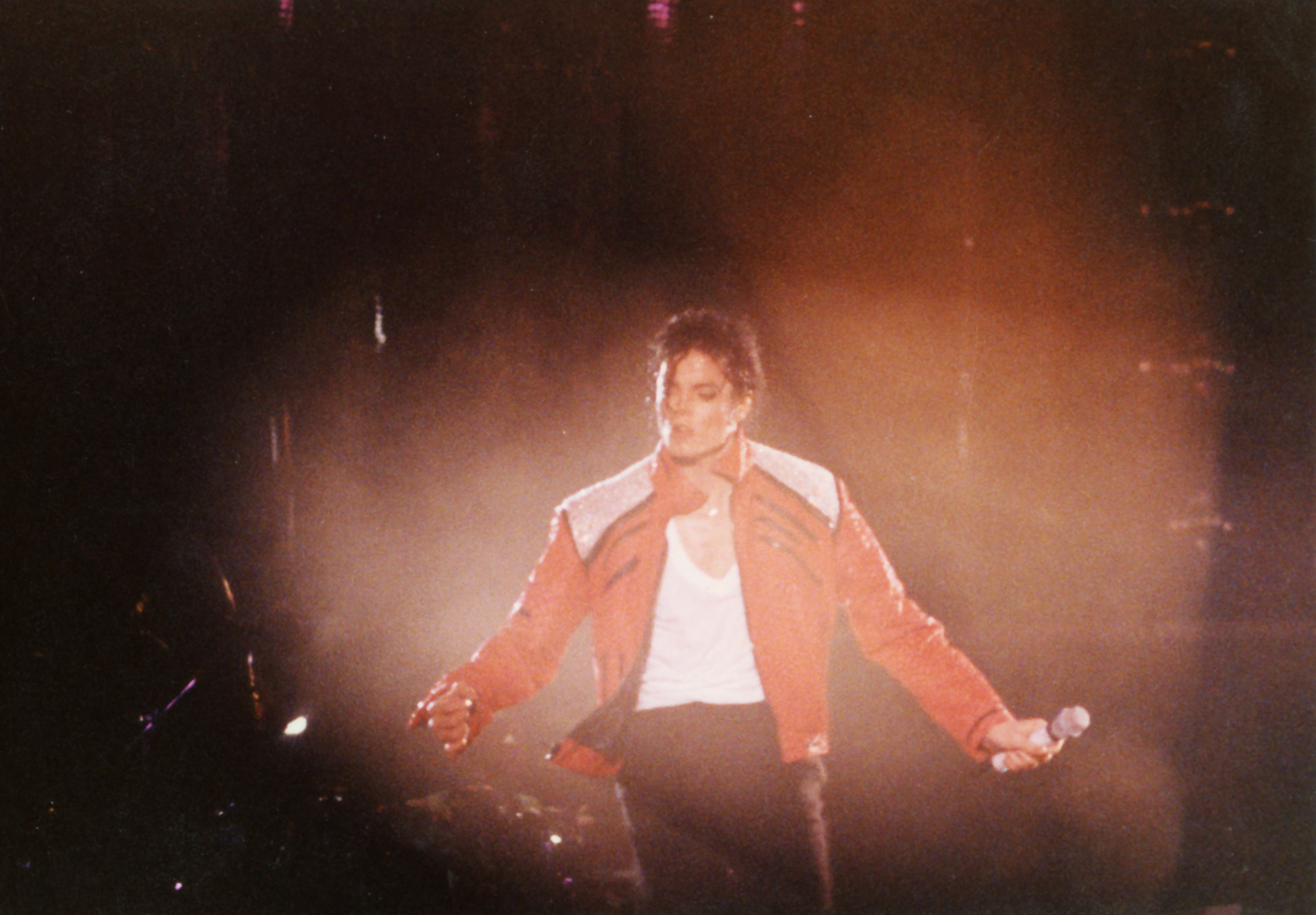
Jackson during the Dangerous World Tour in Monza, Italy, in 1992

Jackson founded the Heal the World Foundation in 1992. The charity brought underprivileged children to Jackson's ranch to use the theme park rides and sent millions of dollars around the world to help children threatened by war, poverty, and disease. That July, Jackson published his second book, Dancing the Dream, a collection of poetry. In support of Dangerous, Jackson embarked on his second world tour, the Dangerous World Tour, to raise money for his Heal the World Foundation. The tour ran from June 1992 to November 1993, grossing $100 million (equivalent to $220 million in 2025) from 69 concerts outside the US and attracting more than 3.5 million people. Jackson sold the broadcast rights for his October 1, 1992, concert in Bucharest to HBO for $20 million (equivalent to $46 million in 2025), then the highest fee ever paid for a concert performer to appear on television. He donated a portion of the fee to aid Romanian children.

Following the death of HIV/AIDS spokesperson and friend Ryan White, Jackson urged the Clinton administration at Bill Clinton's inaugural gala to increase funding for HIV/AIDS charities and research, and performed "Gone Too Soon", a song dedicated to White, and "Heal the World" at the gala. Jackson visited Africa in early 1992; on his first stop in Gabon, he was greeted by more than 100,000 people, some carrying signs that read "Welcome Home Michael", and was awarded the rank of Officer of the National Order of Merit from President Omar Bongo. During his trip to Ivory Coast, Jackson drew larger crowds than Pope John Paul II had on his previous visits. He was crowned "King Sani" by a tribal chief in the Ivorian village of Krindjabo, where he thanked dignitaries in French and English, signed documents formalizing his kingship, and sat on a golden throne while presiding over ceremonial dances.

In January 1993, Jackson performed at the Super Bowl XXVII halftime show in Pasadena, California. The National Football League (NFL) sought a major artist to maintain viewership during halftime following declining audience figures. With 133.4 million viewers, it was the first Super Bowl whose halftime show drew a larger audience than the game itself. Jackson performed "Jam", "Billie Jean", "Black or White", and "Heal the World". Dangerous rose 90 places on the US albums chart following the performance.

Jackson gave a 90-minute interview with Oprah Winfrey on February 10, 1993. He spoke about the abuse he experienced during his childhood at the hands of his father, said he believed he had missed out on much of his childhood, and stated that he often cried from loneliness. He denied tabloid rumors that he had bought the bones of the Elephant Man, slept in a hyperbaric oxygen chamber, or bleached his skin, and stated for the first time that he had vitiligo. After the interview, Dangerous re-entered the US albums chart in the top 10, more than a year after its release. The interview became the most-watched television interview in US history to date, with more than 90 million viewers.

In January 1993, Jackson won three American Music Awards: Favorite Pop/Rock Album (Dangerous), Favorite Soul/R&B Single ("Remember the Time"), and became the first recipient of the International Artist Award of Excellence. In February, he received the "Living Legend Award" at the 35th Annual Grammy Awards in Los Angeles. He attended the ceremony with Brooke Shields. Dangerous was nominated for Best Vocal Performance (for "Black or White"), Best R&B Vocal Performance ("Jam"), and Best R&B Song ("Jam"), and Bruce Swedien and Teddy Riley won the Grammy Award for Best Engineered—Non Classical. In the decades since, Dangerous has been lauded as arguably Jackson's greatest artistic achievement.

=== First child sexual abuse accusations and first marriage (1993–1995) ===
In the second half of 1993, Jackson faced controversy following allegations that he had sexually abused a 13‑year‑old boy, Jordan Chandler, whom he met that year. On July 8, Jordan's father, Evan Chandler, was recorded threatening to ruin Jackson's career with a "carefully planned plot". The following day, Jackson's investigator, Anthony Pellicano, met Jordan, who denied any abuse or inappropriate touching by Jackson. After a letter from psychiatrist Mathis Abrams stating that sexual abuse might have occurred, Chandler allegedly received a confession from his son and demanded $20 million from Jackson on August 4, 1993, which Jackson declined. From August 9–13, 1993, Evan Chandler and his legal team made various counteroffers to secure a settlement from Jackson, escalating their financial demands after his refusal to pay the initial $20 million. Evan later filed a lawsuit in September seeking $30 million for alleged damages. Jackson denied all of the claims and financial demands, prompting Chandler to go public with the allegations.

Prosecutors raided Neverland Ranch and other residences while Jackson was on tour in August, finding no child pornography or other incriminating evidence. In December 1993, Prosecutor Thomas W. Sneddon Jr. filed a court order to conduct a strip search of Jackson, based on a drawing provided by Jordan and submitted to authorities. According to Reuters and USA Today, the description of Jackson's genitalia did not match the photographs taken during the police investigation. The grand jury subsequently subpoenaed Jackson's mother, reportedly to assess whether there were any physical alterations compared to the description. In November 1993, Jackson requested that the civil trial be postponed until after the criminal hearing, arguing that proceeding would violate his civil rights under the circumstances of having to defend himself under double jeopardy. The motion was denied, and in January 1994, the civil lawsuit was settled for $15,331,250, with separate payments of $1.5 million for Evan and June Chandler, totaling $18.3 million allocated to the Chandler family—less than the initial $20–30 million demand.

The settlement documents show that the Chandlers dropped the child molestation allegations from their complaint, with Jackson's settlement filed over claims of negligence. It was later revealed that the settlement did not prevent the Chandlers from testifying in the criminal case. The police never filed criminal charges. The prosecution continued to investigate Jackson from January to June 1994, with Jordan continuing to cooperate with investigators. By July 1994, multiple grand juries had been convened; jurors reported that no damaging evidence was presented. On September 21, 1994, after 400 witnesses had been investigated and another 30 called before the grand juries, the investigation was closed. A few potential leads were found, but all proved false.

Jackson had been taking painkillers for reconstructive scalp surgeries administered after the 1984 Pepsi commercial accident, and became dependent on them to cope with the stress of the allegations. On November 12, 1993, Jackson canceled the remainder of the Dangerous World Tour due to health problems, stress from the allegations, and painkiller addiction. He thanked his friend Elizabeth Taylor for her support. The end of the tour concluded his sponsorship deal with Pepsi.

In late 1993, Jackson proposed to Lisa Marie Presley, the daughter of Elvis Presley, over the phone. They were married in La Vega, Dominican Republic, in May 1994 by civil judge Hugo Francisco Álvarez Pérez. The tabloid media speculated that the wedding was a publicity stunt intended to deflect attention from Jackson's sexual abuse allegations and to boost Presley's career as a singer. Their marriage ended little more than a year later, and they separated in December 1995. Presley cited "irreconcilable differences" when filing for divorce the following month and sought only to reclaim her maiden name. She later said they had attempted to reconcile intermittently for four years after their divorce, traveling internationally to be together.

Jackson composed music for the Sega Genesis video game Sonic the Hedgehog 3 (1994), but left the project around the time the allegations surfaced and went uncredited. His involvement was unconfirmed until 2022. Sega employees said his involvement was terminated following the allegations. However, members of Jackson's team said he was unhappy with how the Genesis hardware replicated his music. The Sonic 3 credits theme was reworked as Jackson's 1996 song "Stranger in Moscow".

=== HIStory, second marriage, fatherhood and Blood on the Dance Floor: HIStory in the Mix (1995–1997) ===
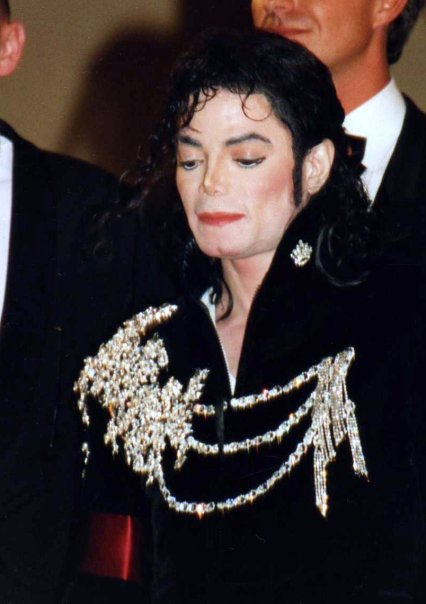
Jackson at the 1997 Cannes Film Festival for the premiere of Michael Jackson's Ghosts

In June 1995, Jackson released the double album HIStory: Past, Present and Future, Book I. The first disc, HIStory Begins, is a greatest hits compilation (reissued in 2001 as Greatest Hits: HIStory, Volume I). The second disc, HIStory Continues, contains 13 original songs and two cover versions. The album debuted at number one on the charts and has been certified for eight million shipments in the US. It is one of the best-selling albums of all time, with 20 million copies (40 million units) sold worldwide. HIStory received a Grammy nomination for Album of the Year. The New York Times described it as "the testimony of a musician whose self-pity now equals his talent".

The first single from HIStory was "Scream/Childhood". "Scream", a duet with Jackson's youngest sister Janet, protests the media's treatment of Jackson during the 1993 child abuse allegations. The single reached number five on the Billboard Hot 100 and received a Grammy nomination for Best Pop Collaboration with Vocals. The second single, "You Are Not Alone", holds the Guinness world record as the first song to debut at number one on the Billboard Hot 100. It received a Grammy nomination for Best Pop Vocal Performance in 1995.

In 1995, the Anti-Defamation League and other groups criticized the original lyrics of "They Don't Care About Us" ("Jew me, sue me, everybody do me / Kick me, kike me, don't you black or white me") as antisemitic. Jackson released a revised version of the song. In late 1995, he was hospitalized after collapsing during rehearsals for a televised performance, the result of a stress‑related panic attack. In November, Jackson merged his ATV Music catalog with Sony's music publishing division, creating Sony/ATV Music Publishing. He retained ownership of half the company, earning $95 million up front (equivalent to $201 million in 2025) as well as rights to additional songs.

"Earth Song" was the third single released from HIStory, and topped the UK Singles Chart for six weeks over Christmas 1995. It became the 87th-best-selling single in UK history. At the 1996 Brit Awards, Jackson's performance of "Earth Song" was interrupted by Pulp singer Jarvis Cocker, who said he was protesting what he viewed as Jackson's "Christ-like" persona. Jackson called the stage invasion "disgusting and cowardly".

In 1996, Jackson won a Grammy for Best Music Video, Short Form, for "Scream" and an American Music Award for Favorite Pop/Rock Male Artist. In July 1996, he performed for Sultan Hassanal Bolkiah's 50th birthday at Jerudong Park Amphitheater in Brunei, which had been built specifically for the event. Jackson was reportedly paid $17 million (equivalent to $35 million in 2025). He promoted HIStory with the HIStory World Tour, from September 7, 1996, to October 15, 1997. He performed 82 concerts across five continents, 35 countries, and 58 cities to more than 4.5 million fans, making it his most‑attended tour. It grossed $165 million (equivalent to $331 million in 2025). During the tour, in Sydney, Australia, Jackson married Debbie Rowe, a dermatology assistant who was six months pregnant with his first child.

Michael Joseph Jackson Jr. (commonly known as Prince) was born on February 13, 1997. His sister Paris-Michael Katherine Jackson was born on April 3, 1998. Jackson and Rowe divorced in 2000; Rowe conceded custody of the children and received an $8.5 million settlement (equivalent to $15.9 million in 2025). In 2004, after the second child abuse allegations against Jackson, she returned to court seeking to regain custody. The suit was settled in 2006.

In 1997, Jackson released Blood on the Dance Floor: HIStory in the Mix, which contained remixes of singles from HIStory and five new songs. Worldwide sales stand at 6 million copies, making it the best-selling remix album of all time. It reached number one in the UK, as did the single "Blood on the Dance Floor". In the US, the album reached number 24 and was certified platinum.

=== Label dispute and Invincible (1997–2002) ===
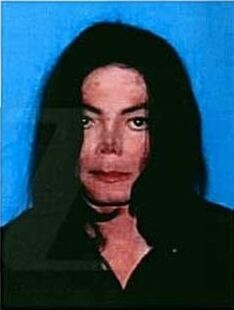
Jackson's 2005 drivers license, in which his vitiligo was clearly visible.

From October 1997 to September 2001, Jackson worked on his tenth solo album, Invincible, which cost $30 million (equivalent to $54.5 million in 2025) to record, making it the most expensive album of all time. In June 1999, Jackson joined Luciano Pavarotti for a War Child benefit concert in Modena, Italy. The show raised a million dollars for refugees of the Kosovo War, and additional funds for the children of Guatemala. Later that month, Jackson organized a series of "Michael Jackson & Friends" benefit concerts in Germany and South Korea. Other artists involved included Slash, The Scorpions, Boyz II Men, Luther Vandross, Mariah Carey, A. R. Rahman, Prabhu Deva Sundaram, Shobana, Andrea Bocelli and Luciano Pavarotti. The proceeds went to the Nelson Mandela Children's Fund, the Red Cross and UNESCO. Jackson was presented with the "Outstanding Humanitarian Award" at the 1999 Bollywood Movie Awards in New York City where he noted Mahatma Gandhi was an inspiration for him. At the turn of the century, Jackson was awarded with the Artist of the 1980s Decade Award at the 27th American Music Awards, and the Best Selling Pop Male Artist of the Millennium Award at the 12th World Music Awards. In 2000, Guinness World Records recognized him for supporting 39 charities, more than any other entertainer.

Two concerts were held in September 2001 at Madison Square Garden to mark Jackson's 30th year as a solo artist. Jackson performed with his brothers for the first time since 1984. The show also featured Mýa, Usher, Whitney Houston, Destiny's Child, Monica, Liza Minnelli and Slash. The first show was marred by technical lapses, and the crowd booed a speech by Marlon Brando. 45 million people watched the television broadcast of the shows in November according to Nielsen Media Research. After the September 11 attacks, which Jackson narrowly avoided death by oversleeping and missing a scheduled meeting at the World Trade Center, he helped organize the United We Stand: What More Can I Give benefit concert at Robert F. Kennedy Memorial Stadium in Washington, D.C., on October 21, 2001. Jackson performed "What More Can I Give" as the finale.

The release of Invincible was preceded by a dispute between Jackson and his record label, Sony Music Entertainment. He had expected the licenses to the masters of his albums to revert to him in the early 2000s, and enable him to keep the profits and promote his material as desired, but clauses in the contract set the revert date years into the future. Jackson sought an early exit from his contract. Invincible was released on October 30, 2001. It was Jackson's first full-length album in six years, and the last album of original material he released in his lifetime. It debuted at number one in 13 countries, and went on to sell eight million copies worldwide, receiving double-platinum certification in the US.

On January 9, 2002, Jackson won his 22nd American Music Award for Artist of the Century. Later that year, an anonymous surrogate mother gave birth to his third child, Prince Michael Jackson II (nicknamed "Blanket"), who had been conceived by artificial insemination. On November 20, Jackson briefly held Blanket over the railing of his Berlin hotel room, four stories above ground level, prompting widespread criticism in the media. Jackson apologized for the incident, calling it "a terrible mistake". On January 22, promoter Marcel Avram filed a breach of contract complaint against Jackson for failing to perform two planned 1999 concerts. In March, a Santa Maria jury ordered Jackson to pay Avram $5.3 million (equivalent to $9.5 million in 2025). On December 18, 2003, Jackson's attorneys dropped all appeals on the verdict and settled the lawsuit for an undisclosed amount.

On April 24, 2002, Jackson performed at Apollo Theater. The concert was a fundraiser for the Democratic National Committee and former President Bill Clinton. The money collected would be used to encourage citizens to vote. It raised $2.5 million (equivalent to $3.9 million in 2025). The concert was called Michael Jackson: Live at the Apollo and was one of Jackson's final on-stage performances.

In July 2002, at Al Sharpton's National Action Network in Harlem, Jackson called the Sony Music chairman Tommy Mottola "a racist, and very, very, very devilish", and accused him of exploiting black artists for his own gain. The accusation prompted Sharpton to form a coalition investigating whether Mottola exploited black artists. Jackson charged that Mottola had called his colleague Irv Gotti a "fat nigger". Sony issued a statement calling the accusations "ludicrous, spiteful, and hurtful" and said Mottola had championed Jackson's career for years. Sony refused to renew Jackson's contract and said that a $25 million (equivalent to $44.8 million in 2025) promotional campaign had failed because Jackson refused to tour in the US for Invincible.

=== Documentary, Number Ones, second child abuse allegations and acquittal (2002–2005) ===
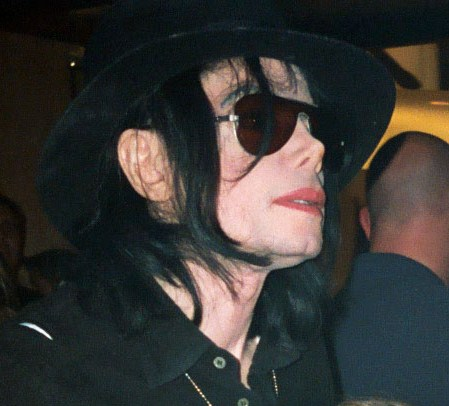
Jackson in Las Vegas, 2003

Beginning in May 2002, a documentary film crew led by Martin Bashir followed Jackson for several months. The documentary, broadcast in February 2003 as Living with Michael Jackson, showed Jackson holding hands and discussing sleeping arrangements with a twelve-year-old boy. He discussed seeing nothing wrong with having sleepovers with minors and sharing his bed and bedroom with various people, which aroused controversy. He insisted that the sleepovers were not sexual and that his words had been misunderstood.

In October 2003, Jackson received the Key to the City of Las Vegas from Mayor Oscar Goodman. On November 18, 2003, Sony released Number Ones, a greatest hits album. It was certified five times platinum in the US and ten times platinum in the UK, for shipments of at least 3 million units.

On December 18, 2003, Santa Barbara authorities charged Jackson with seven counts of child molestation and two counts of intoxicating a minor with alcoholic drinks. Jackson denied the allegations and pleaded not guilty. The People v. Jackson trial began on January 31, 2005, in Santa Maria, California, and lasted until the end of May. Jackson found the experience stressful and it affected his health. If convicted, he would have faced up to twenty years in prison. On June 13, 2005, Jackson was acquitted on all counts. FBI files on Jackson, released in 2009, showed that the FBI found no evidence of criminal conduct.

=== Final years, financial problems, Thriller 25 and This Is It (2005–2009) ===
Jackson and his son Blanket in Disneyland Paris, 2006

After the trial, Jackson became reclusive. He moved to Bahrain during June 2005 as a guest of Sheikh Abdullah. He never returned to Neverland. In early 2006, it was announced that Jackson had signed a contract with a Bahrain startup, Two Seas Records. Nothing came of the deal, and the Two Seas CEO, Guy Holmes, later said it was never finalized. Holmes also found that Jackson was on the verge of bankruptcy and was involved in 47 ongoing lawsuits. By September 2006, Jackson was no longer affiliated with Two Seas.

In April 2006, Jackson agreed to use a piece of his ATV catalog stake, then worth about $1 billion, as collateral against his $270 million worth of loans from Bank of America. Bank of America had sold the loans to Fortress Investments, an investment company that buys distressed loans, the year before. As part of the agreement, Fortress Investments provided Jackson a new loan of $300 million with reduced interest payments (equivalent to $480 million in 2025). Sony Music would have the option to buy half of his stake, or about 25% of the catalog, at a set price. Jackson's financial managers had urged him to shed part of his stake to avoid bankruptcy. The main house at Neverland Ranch was closed as a cost-cutting measure, while Jackson lived in Bahrain in 2005. At least thirty of Jackson's employees had not been paid on time and were owed $306,000 in back wages. Jackson was ordered to pay $100,000 in penalties.

In mid-2006, Jackson moved to Grouse Lodge, a residential recording studio near Rosemount, County Westmeath, Ireland. There, he began work on a new album with the American producers will.i.am and Rodney Jerkins. That November, Jackson invited an Access Hollywood camera crew into the studio in Westmeath. He briefly joined a performance of "We Are the World" at the World Music Awards in London, which served as his last public performance, and accepted the Diamond Award for sales of 100 million records. Jackson returned to the US in December, settling in Las Vegas. That month, he attended James Brown's funeral in Augusta, Georgia, where he gave a eulogy calling Brown his greatest inspiration.

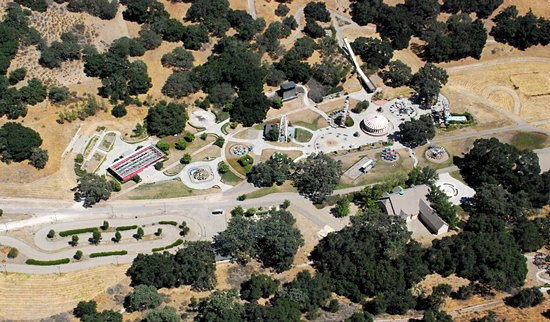
An aerial view of part of Jackson's 2,800-acre (11 km^{2}) Neverland Valley Ranch near Los Olivos, California, showing the rides

Jackson and Sony bought another music publishing company during 2007, Famous Music LLC, formerly owned by Viacom. The deal gave him the rights to songs by Eminem and Beck, among others. Jackson mentioned having no regrets about his career despite the "deliberate attempts to hurt me". That March, he visited a US Army post in Japan, Camp Zama, to greet more than 3,000 troops and their families. By September, Jackson was still working on his next album, with Kanye West joining as a producer.

In 2008, for the 25th anniversary of Thriller, Jackson and Sony released Thriller 25, a reissue which included five newly remixed tracks co-produced by him and guest producers, including the singles: "The Girl Is Mine 2008" and "Wanna Be Startin' Somethin' 2008". Thriller 25 was the last recorded work released during Jackson's lifetime that he was extensively involved in. For Jackson's 50th birthday, Sony BMG released a series of greatest hits albums, King of Pop, with different tracklists for different regions. That July, Fortress Investments threatened to foreclose on Neverland Ranch, which he had used as collateral for his loans. Fortress sold Jackson's debts to Colony Capital LLC. In November, Jackson transferred Neverland Ranch's title to Sycamore Valley Ranch Company LLC, a joint venture between Jackson and Colony Capital LLC. The deal earned him $35 million. In 2009, Jackson arranged to sell a collection of his memorabilia of more than 1,000 items through Julien's Auction House, but canceled the auction in April.

In March 2009, amid speculation about his finances and health, Jackson announced a series of comeback concerts, This Is It, at a press conference at the O2 Arena. The shows were to be his first major concerts since the HIStory World Tour in 1997. Jackson suggested he would retire after the shows. The initial plan was for ten concerts in London, followed by shows in Paris, New York City and Mumbai. Randy Phillips, the president and chief executive of AEG Live, predicted the first ten dates would earn Jackson £50 million.

The London residency was increased to fifty dates after record-breaking ticket sales; more than one million were sold in less than two hours. The concerts were to run from July 13, 2009, to March 6, 2010. Jackson moved to Los Angeles, where he rehearsed in the weeks leading up to the tour under the direction of the choreographer Kenny Ortega, whom he had worked with during his previous tours. Rehearsals took place at the Forum and the Staples Center owned by AEG. By this point, Jackson's debt had grown to almost $500 million. By the time of his death, he was three or four months behind payments on his home in San Fernando Valley. The Independent reported that Jackson planned a string of further ventures designed to recoup his debts, including a world tour, a new album, films, a museum and a casino.

== Death ==
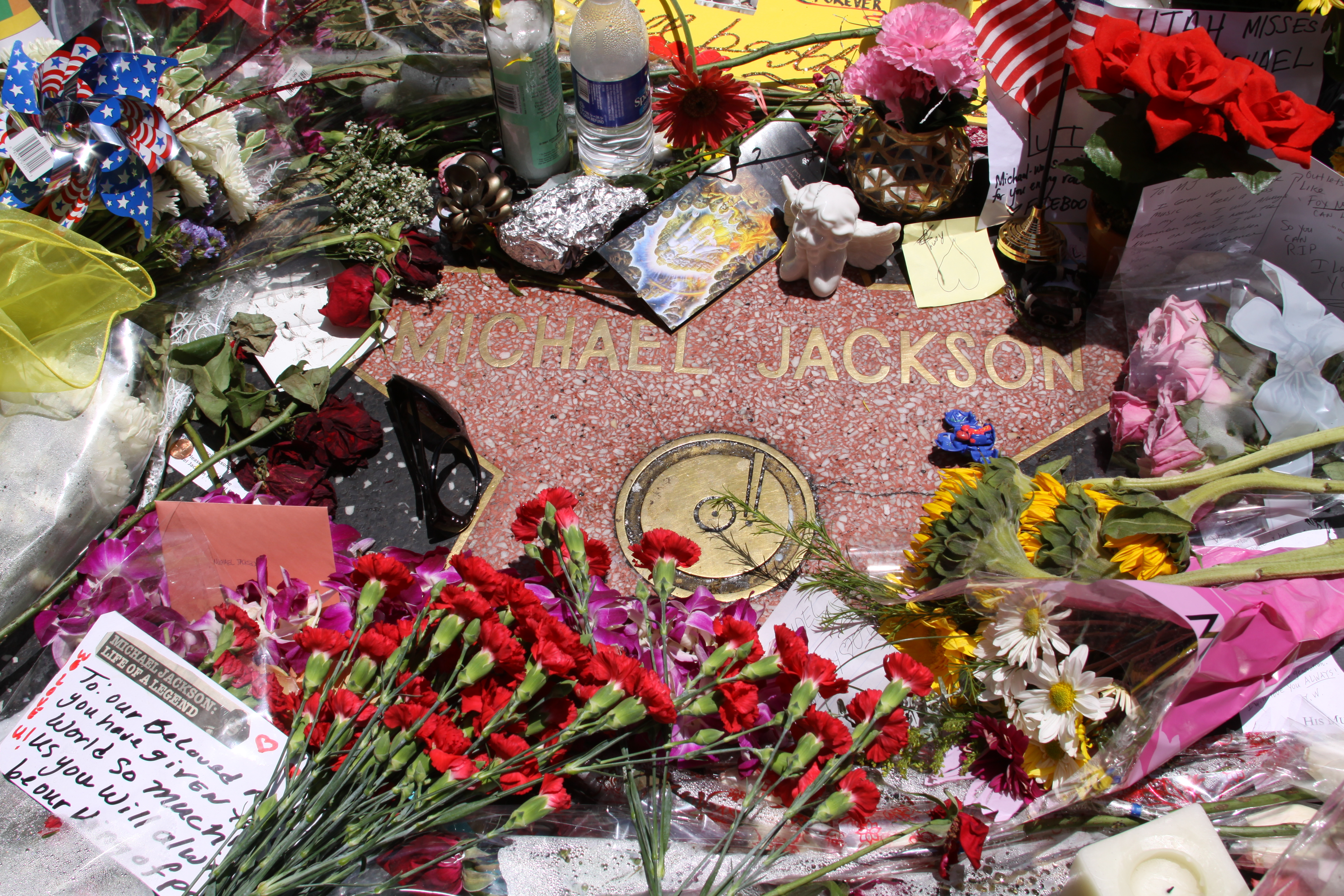
Fans placed flowers and notes on Jackson's star on the Hollywood Walk of Fame on the day of his death.

On June 25, 2009, less than three weeks before his concert residency was scheduled to begin in London, with all dates sold out, Jackson died at age 50 from cardiac arrest caused by a propofol and benzodiazepine overdose. His personal physician, Conrad Murray, had administered various medications to help him sleep at his home in Holmby Hills, Los Angeles. Paramedics received a 911 call at 12:21 pm Pacific time (19:21 UTC) and arrived four minutes later. Jackson was not breathing, and CPR was performed. Resuscitation efforts continued en route to Ronald Reagan UCLA Medical Center and for more than an hour after his arrival, but were unsuccessful, and he was pronounced dead at 2:26 pm Pacific time (21:26 UTC). Murray had administered propofol, lorazepam, and midazolam; Jackson's death resulted from a propofol overdose.

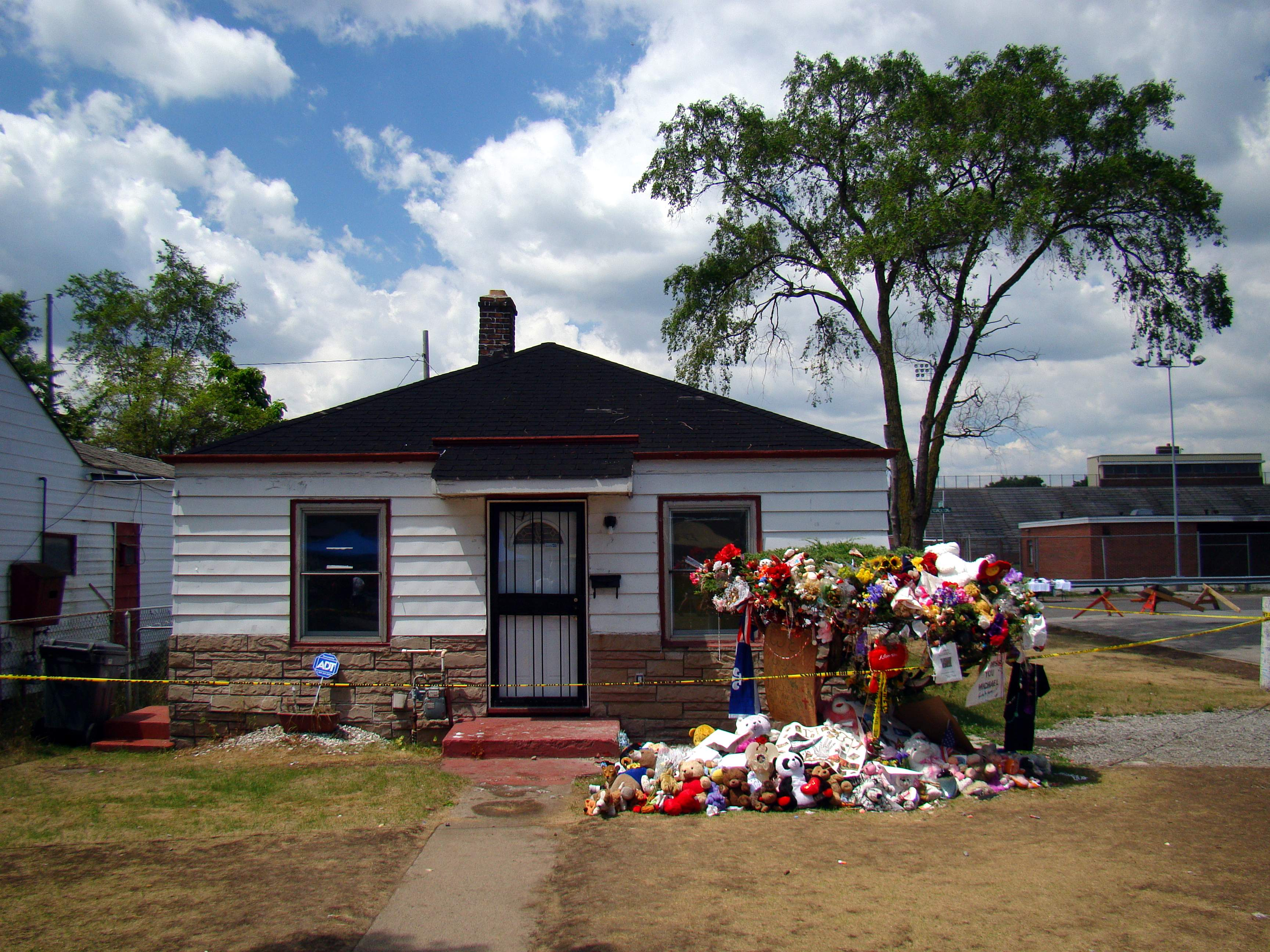
Jackson's childhood home in Gary, Indiana, one month after his death, showing floral tributes

News of his death spread rapidly online, causing websites to slow down or crash from heavy traffic, and placing unprecedented strain on services including Google, AOL Instant Messenger, Twitter, and Wikipedia. Overall web traffic increased by between 11% and 20%. MTV and BET aired marathons of Jackson's music videos. MTV briefly returned to its original music video format, broadcasting extended blocks of his videos alongside live news specials featuring reactions from MTV personalities and other celebrities. President Barack Obama sent a letter of condolence to the Jackson family, and the House of Representatives observed a moment of silence.

=== Memorial service ===
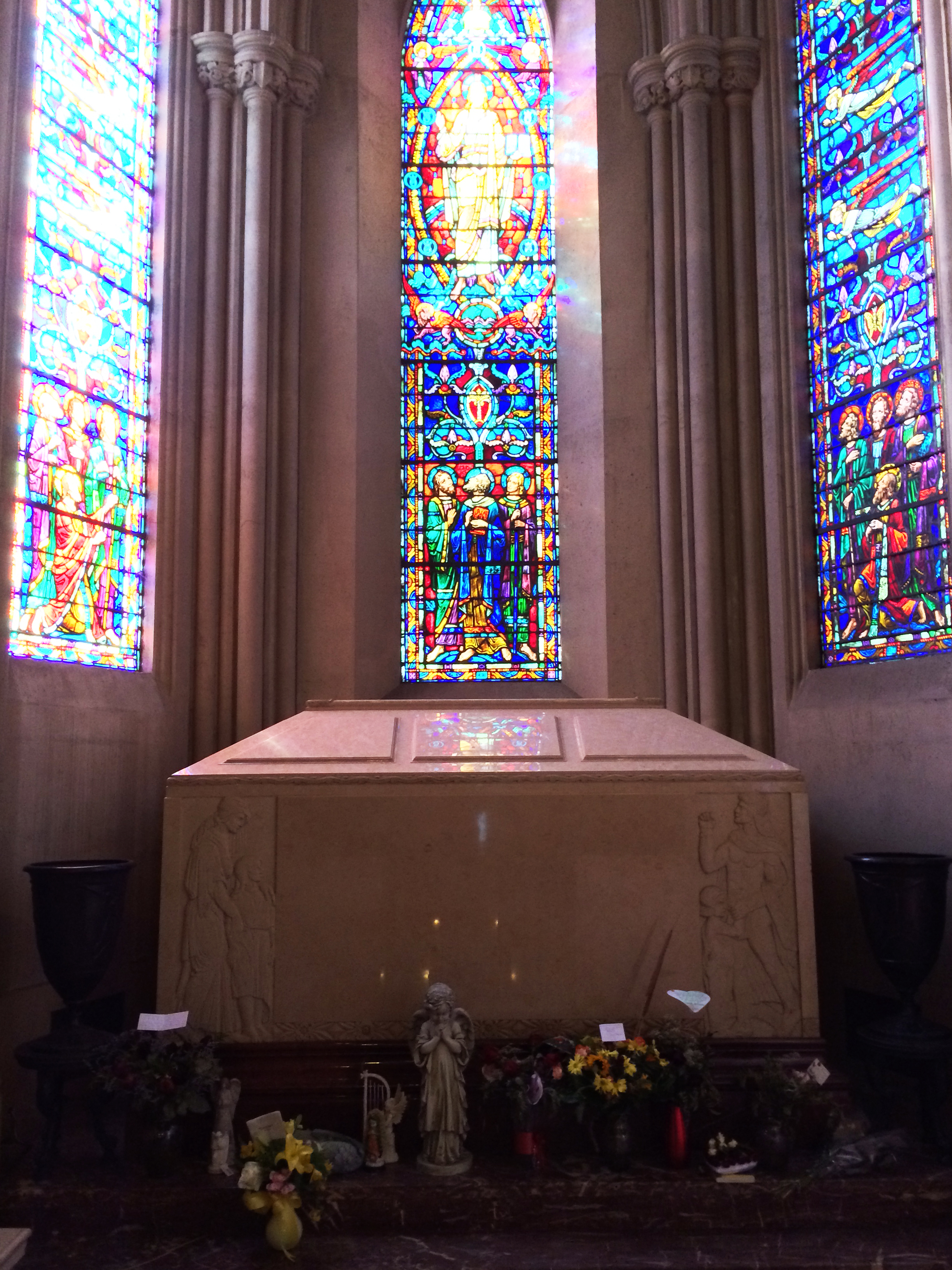
Jackson's unmarked crypt at the end of the Sanctuary of Ascension in the Holly Terrace of the Great Mausoleum, Forest Lawn Glendale

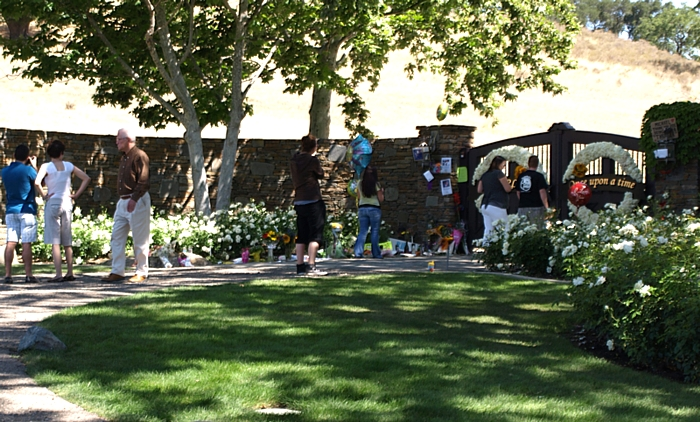
Fans visiting the makeshift memorial set up outside the Neverland Ranch entrance shortly after Jackson's death

Jackson's memorial was held on July 7, 2009, at the Staples Center in Los Angeles, preceded by a private family service at Forest Lawn Memorial Park's Hall of Liberty. Over 1.6 million fans applied for tickets to the memorial; the 8,750 recipients were drawn at random, and each received two tickets. The memorial service was one of the most watched events in streaming history, with an estimated US audience of 31.1 million and a worldwide audience of an estimated 2.5 to 3 billion.

Mariah Carey, Stevie Wonder, Lionel Richie, Jennifer Hudson, and Shaheen Jafargholi performed at the memorial, and Berry Gordy, Brooke Shields, Smokey Robinson and Queen Latifah gave eulogies. Al Sharpton received a standing ovation with cheers when he told Jackson's children: "Wasn't nothing strange about your daddy. It was strange what your daddy had to deal with. But he dealt with it anyway." Jackson's 11-year-old daughter Paris Katherine, speaking publicly for the first time, wept as she addressed the crowd. Lucious Smith provided a closing prayer. On September 3, 2009, Jackson was entombed at Forest Lawn Memorial Park in Glendale, California.

=== Criminal investigation and prosecution of Conrad Murray ===
In August 2009, the Los Angeles County Coroner ruled that Jackson's death was a homicide. Law enforcement officials charged Murray with involuntary manslaughter on February 8, 2010. In late 2011, he was found guilty of the charge and held without bail to await sentencing. Murray was sentenced to four years in prison, but was released after one year and eleven months.

=== Posthumous releases and productions ===
Jackson's posthumous releases and productions are administered by the estate of Michael Jackson, which owns Jackson's trademarks and rights to his name, image and likeness. The first posthumous Jackson song, "This Is It", co-written in the 1980s with Paul Anka, was released in October 2009. The surviving Jackson brothers reunited to record backing vocals. It was followed by a documentary film about the rehearsals for the canceled This Is It tour, Michael Jackson's This Is It, and a compilation album. Despite a limited two-week engagement, the film became the highest-grossing documentary or concert film ever, with earnings of more than $260 million worldwide. Jackson's estate received 90% of the profits.

In late 2010, Sony released the first posthumous album, Michael, and the lead single "Hold My Hand", a duet with Akon. The Jackson collaborator will.i.am expressed disgust, saying that Jackson would not have approved the release. Controversy ensued over the authenticity of Jackson's vocals on the tracks "Breaking News", "Keep Your Head Up", and "Monster" (featuring 50 Cent). Members of Jackson's family, will.i.am, and fans alleged they were performed by an impersonator. In 2022, Sony and the Jackson estate reissued Michael without the disputed tracks, stating it was "time to move beyond the distraction surrounding them".

The video game developer Ubisoft released a music game featuring Jackson for the 2010 holiday season, Michael Jackson: The Experience. It was among the first games to use Kinect and PlayStation Move, the motion-detecting camera systems for Xbox 360 and PlayStation 3. In October 2011, the theater company Cirque du Soleil launched Michael Jackson: The Immortal World Tour, a $57 million production in Montreal. A larger and more theatrical Cirque show, Michael Jackson: One, designed for residency at the Mandalay Bay resort in Las Vegas, opened on May 23, 2013, in a renovated theater.

In 2012, in an attempt to end a family dispute, Jackson's brother Jermaine retracted his signature on a public letter criticizing executors of Jackson's estate and his mother's advisors over the legitimacy of his brother's will. T.J. Jackson, the son of Tito Jackson, was given co-guardianship of Michael Jackson's children after false reports of Katherine Jackson going missing. Xscape, an album of unreleased material, was released on May 13, 2014. The lead single, a duet between Jackson and Justin Timberlake, "Love Never Felt So Good", reached number 9 on the US Billboard Hot 100, making Jackson the first artist to have a top-10 single on the chart in five different decades.

Later in 2014, Queen released a duet recorded with Jackson in the 1980s. A compilation album, Scream, was released on September 29, 2017. A jukebox musical, MJ the Musical, premiered on Broadway in 2022. Myles Frost won the 2022 Tony Award for Best Actor in a Musical for his portrayal of Jackson. On November 18, 2022, Epic released a 40th-anniversary edition reissue of Thriller. Since Jackson's death, his estate has grossed $2 billion in ticket revenue from MJ the Musical, Michael Jackson's This Is It and two Cirque du Soleil productions. A biographical film, Michael, directed by Antoine Fuqua and starring Jackson's nephew Jaafar Jackson, premiered in April 2026. It received generally negative reviews from critics. The film broke records for biopics on opening day and opening week, with an opening weekend gross estimated at $97 million domestically and $217 million worldwide, becoming the second highest-grossing film of 2026.

=== Posthumous sales ===
At the 2009 American Music Awards, Jackson won four posthumous awards, including two for his compilation album Number Ones, bringing his total American Music Awards to 26. In the year after his death, more than 16.1 million copies of Jackson's albums were sold in the US alone, and 35 million copies were sold worldwide, more than any other artist in 2009. He became the first artist to sell one million music downloads in a week, with 2.6 million song downloads. Thriller, Number Ones and The Essential Michael Jackson became the first catalog albums to outsell any new album. Jackson also became the first artist to have four of the top-20 best-selling albums in a single year in the US. Within the year following his death, Jackson sold over 75 million records worldwide. By the end of 2013, Jackson had sold over 50 million albums worldwide since his death.

Following the surge in sales, in March 2010, Sony Music signed a $250 million deal (equivalent to $370 million in 2025) with the Jackson estate to extend their distribution rights to Jackson's back catalog until at least 2017; it had been due to expire in 2015. It was the most expensive music contract for a single artist in history. They agreed to release ten albums of previously unreleased material and new collections of released work. The deal was extended in 2017. That July, a Los Angeles court awarded Quincy Jones $9.4 million of disputed royalty payments for Off the Wall, Thriller, and Bad. In July 2018, Sony/ATV bought the estate's stake in EMI for $287.5 million.

In 2015, Thriller became the first album to be certified for 30 million shipments in the US. A year later, it was certified 33-times platinum after Soundscan added streams and audio downloads to album certifications. (Note: In 2018, its US sales record was overtaken by the Eagles's album Greatest Hits 1971–75, with 38× platinum.) In February 2024, Sony Music acquired half of Jackson's publishing rights and recording masters for $600 million. The deal includes assets from his Mijac publishing catalog, but excludes royalties from several Jackson-related productions, such as the MJ Broadway musical and the 2026 Michael film. The transaction is possibly the largest for a single musician's work.

=== Posthumous child sexual abuse allegations ===
In 2013, the choreographer Wade Robson filed a lawsuit alleging that Jackson had sexually abused him for seven years, beginning when he was seven years old (1989–1996). In 2014, a case was filed by James Safechuck, alleging similar sexual abuse over a four-year period starting when Safechuck was ten (1988–1992). Both had previously testified in Jackson's defense during the 1993 allegations; Robson did so again in 2005. In 2015, Robson's case against Jackson's estate was dismissed as it exceeded California's statute of limitations. Safechuck's claim was also time-barred.

In 2017, the Los Angeles County Superior Court ruled that Jackson's corporations could not be held accountable for his alleged past actions. The rulings were appealed. On October 20, 2020, Safechuck's lawsuit against Jackson's corporations was again dismissed. The judge ruled that there was no evidence that Safechuck had a relationship with Jackson's corporation, nor was it proven that there was a special relationship between the two. On April 26, 2021, Robson's case was dismissed because of a lack of supporting evidence that the defendants exercised control over Jackson.

In 2020, California law was modified to allow plaintiffs in child sex abuse cases additional time to file lawsuits. In October 2020 and again in April 2021, the Los Angeles County Superior Court ruled in Safechuck v. MJJ Productions that MJJ Productions Inc. and MJJ Ventures Inc. employees were not legally obligated to protect the two men from Jackson. In August 2023, California's Second District Court of Appeal overturned the ruling, and the case was approved to move forward to trial court. The trial is set to begin in November 2026.

In 2019, four siblings, Edward, Dominic, Marie-Nicole and Aldo Cascio, alleged that Jackson had abused them when they were children. They had defended Jackson against previous allegations, but changed their position after the release of Leaving Neverland. The estate paid them a $3.5 million settlement without admitting wrongdoing. In 2026, the Cascio siblings filed a federal lawsuit against the Jackson estate, saying they had been coerced into the settlement. On August 12, a federal judge dismissed the lawsuit, as a clause in the settlement specified the dispute required arbitration and could not be handled in a public court.

==== Leaving Neverland ====
Robson and Safechuck's allegations were the subject of Dan Reed's documentary film Leaving Neverland, broadcast by HBO in March 2019. The documentary triggered a backlash against Jackson; radio stations in New Zealand, Canada, the UK and the Netherlands removed his music from their playlists, and a 50th anniversary documentary about the Jackson 5 was canceled. However, Jackson's album sales increased, and his honors were not rescinded. The Billboard senior editor Gail Mitchell said she and a colleague interviewed about thirty music executives who believed Jackson's legacy could withstand the controversy.

Jackson's family condemned Leaving Neverland as a "public lynching", and the Jackson estate called it a "tabloid character assassination [Jackson] endured in life, and now in death". Close associates of Jackson, such as Corey Feldman, Aaron Carter, Brett Barnes, and Macaulay Culkin, said that he had never molested them, and rebuttal documentaries, such as Square One: Michael Jackson, Neverland Firsthand: Investigating the Michael Jackson Documentary and Michael Jackson: Chase the Truth, sought to refute the allegations in Leaving Neverland. In late 2019, some New Zealand and Canadian radio stations re-added Jackson's music to their playlists due to "positive listener survey results". Leaving Neverland 2: Surviving Michael Jackson (2025), which covers Robson and Safechuck taking their allegations to trial, premiered on YouTube.

== Legacy ==
Jackson at the White House in 1984. President Ronald Reagan described him as "one of the most talented, most popular and most exciting superstars."

Jackson has been referred to as the "King of Pop" for having transformed the art of music videos and paving the way for modern pop music. For much of Jackson's career, he had an unparalleled worldwide influence over the younger generation. His influence extended beyond the music industry; he impacted dance, led fashion trends, and raised awareness for global affairs. Jackson's music and videos fostered racial diversity in MTV's roster and steered its focus from rock to pop music and R&B, leading to the discontinuation of the album-oriented rock format previously dominant on the channel. In songs such as "Black or White", "Heal the World", "Earth Song" and "They Don't Care About Us", Jackson's music emphasized racial integration and environmentalism and protested injustice. He is considered one of the most significant cultural figures of the 20th century, and his contributions to music, dance, and fashion, along with his publicized personal life, made him a global figure in popular culture for over four decades.

Jackson's meteoric rise in the 1980s catapulted him to global stardom, and his influence transcended borders. In Africa, his influence was compared to Nelson Mandela for his ability to inspire and unite diverse audiences through his music. Similarly, in India, Jackson was likened to Mahatma Gandhi, with his art championing themes of social justice and humanitarianism, and his influence extending to Bollywood where it was said that anyone who danced well was compared to Jackson. In Europe, Jackson's influence was compared to that of the Pope; huge crowds gathered to see him in public and even more attended his concerts, which spread messages of love and healing during rough economic and political times. His presence in the Middle East was considered as widespread as Coca-Cola, symbolizing a shared global culture through his music. Additionally, Jackson is considered the backbone of the K-pop industry in South Korea, influencing countless artists and shaping the genre's development.

So vast, far-reaching and was his impact—particularly in the wake of Thriller's colossal and heretofore unmatched commercial success—that there weren't a whole lot of artists who weren't trying to mimic some of the Jackson formula.

— J. Edward Keyes of Rolling Stone

Danyel Smith, chief content officer of Vibe Media Group and the editor-in-chief of Vibe, described Jackson as "the greatest star". Steve Huey of AllMusic called him "an unstoppable juggernaut, possessed of all the skills to dominate the charts seemingly at will: an instantly identifiable voice, eye-popping dance moves, stunning musical versatility and loads of sheer star power". BET said Jackson was "quite simply the greatest entertainer of all time" whose "sound, style, movement and legacy continues to inspire artists of all genres". In 1984, Time pop critic Jay Cocks wrote that Jackson was the biggest phenomenon since the Beatles and Elvis Presley, while possibly "the most popular black singer ever". Cocks declared him a "star of records, radio, rock video" and the "dancer with the fanciest feet". In 2003, The Daily Telegraph writer Tom Utley described Jackson as "extremely important" and a "genius". At Jackson's memorial service on July 7, 2009, Motown founder Berry Gordy called Jackson "the greatest entertainer that ever lived". Jackson is recognized as the "Most Successful Entertainer of All Time" by Guinness World Records. He has also appeared on Rolling Stone's lists of the "Greatest Singers of All Time".

Craig Glenday, the editor-in-chief of Guinness World Records, called Jackson the most famous person in the world in 2006. Following Jackson's death, Glenday wrote in an obituary that Jackson had maintained this status up until his death, later remarking that his fame had exceeded that of Confucius. The Guardian wrote that he was in a league of his own in terms of fame, noting that Jackson had become so famous that the number of people who might not know who he was had become statistically insignificant. Due to his unprecedented influence, Jackson is widely recognized as one of the most famous and globally renowned figures in history. Reports of his fame extend from the Middle East, Africa, India, and China to tribes in the Amazon. His influence even reached remote corners of the world such as São Tomé and Príncipe, or Tristan da Cunha, where tribute artists keep his legacy alive by celebrating his music.

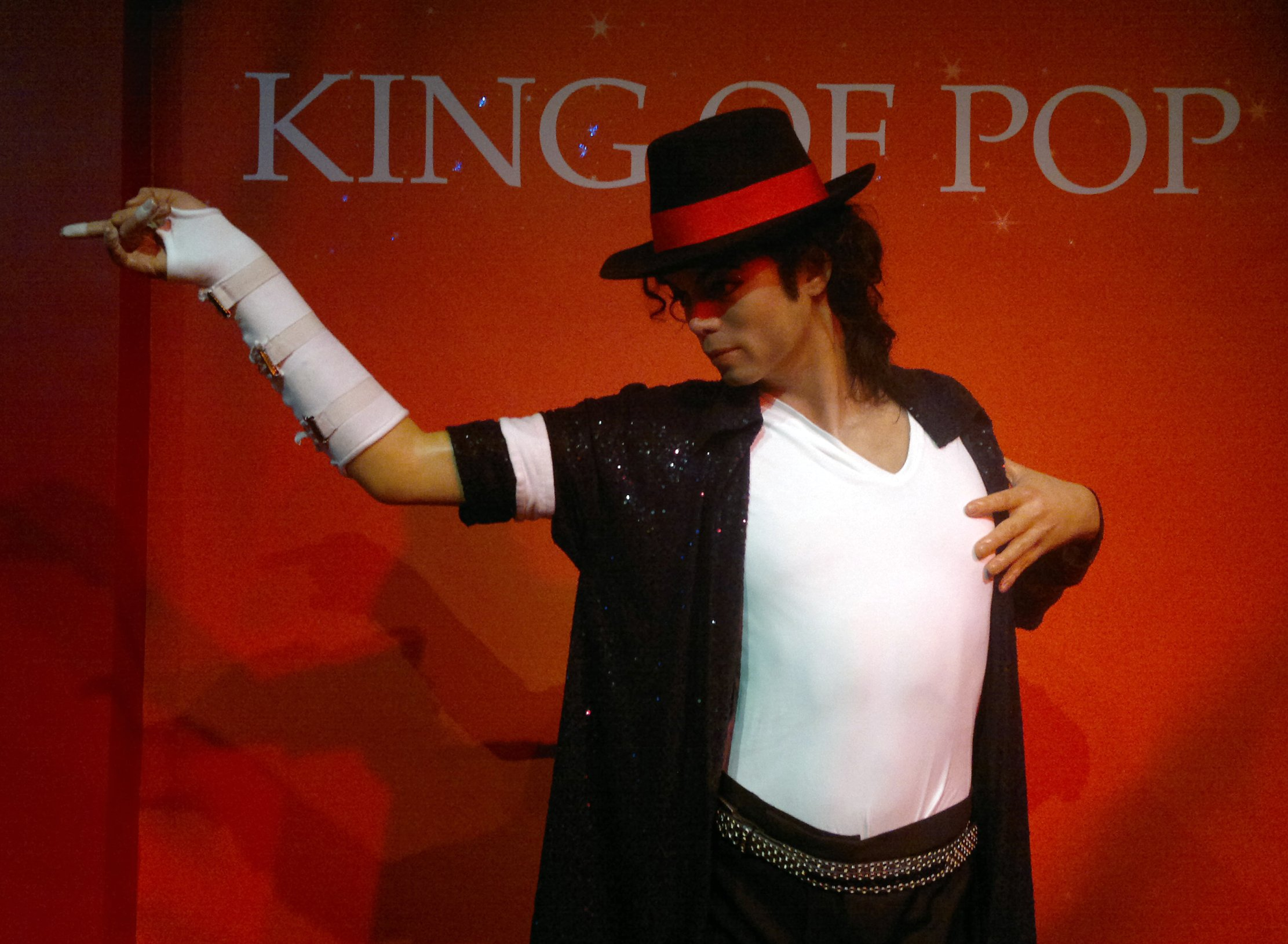
The Jackson wax figure at Madame Tussauds in London

In 2018, the National Portrait Gallery named Jackson the most depicted cultural figure of the century, later stating that Jackson's influence on art rivaled that of Jesus Christ. Nicholas Cullinan, director of the National Portrait Gallery and curator of the Michael Jackson: On the Wall exhibition, described Jackson's influence on art as unprecedented and claimed in 2018 that Jackson was the most depicted figure in the history of contemporary art. In 2014, a comprehensive study conducted by researcher Young-Ho Eom at the University of Toulouse identified Jackson as one of the most influential people of all time. The study utilized advanced ranking methods, including 2D Rank and PageRank algorithms, to analyze the influence of historical figures. Jackson was prominently placed on the list of top influencers, alongside Swedish botanist Carl Linnaeus, Adolf Hitler, and Jesus Christ. Another study conducted in 2013 also identified Jackson as one of the most influential people of all time. This study ranked Jackson at the top of the list, alongside Napoleon Bonaparte, highlighting the extraordinary influence and global recognition that Jackson achieved throughout his career. Numerous publications and academic studies have noted his influence beyond music in fields such as psychology, law, chemistry, and engineering.

== Philanthropy ==
President Ronald Reagan rewarding Jackson in 1984 for his support of alcohol and drug abuse charities

Jackson is well known for his prolific philanthropy and humanitarianism. Jackson's early charitable work has been described by The Chronicle of Philanthropy as having "paved the way for the current surge in celebrity philanthropy", and by the Los Angeles Times as having "set the standard for generosity for other entertainers". By some estimates, he donated over $500 million, not accounting for inflation, to various charities over the course of his life. In 1992, Jackson established his Heal the World Foundation, to which he donated several million dollars in revenue from his Dangerous World Tour.

Jackson's philanthropic activities went beyond just monetary donations. He also performed at benefit concerts, some of which he arranged. He gifted tickets for his regular concert performances to groups that assist underprivileged children. Jackson visited sick children in hospitals around the world. He donated valuable, personal and professional paraphernalia for numerous charity auctions. He received various awards and accolades for his philanthropic work, including two bestowed by American presidents. The vast breadth of Jackson's philanthropic work has earned recognition in the Guinness World Records.

On May 14, 1984, President Ronald Reagan gave Jackson an award recognizing his support of alcohol and drug abuse charities, and in recognition of his support for the Ad Council's and the National Highway Traffic Safety Administration's Drunk Driving Prevention campaign. Jackson allowed the campaign to use "Beat It" for its public service announcements.

== Artistry ==
=== Vocal style ===
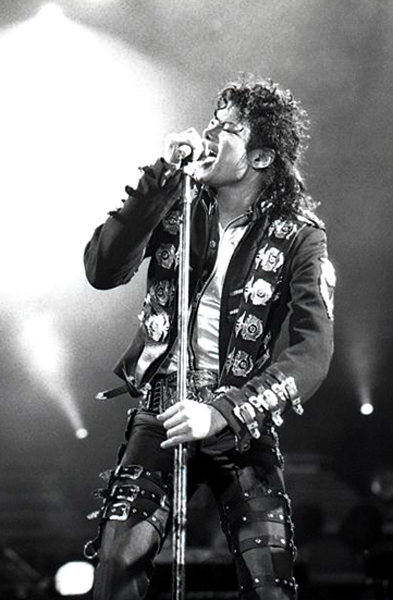
Jackson performing in Vienna, Austria, 1988

Jackson was known as an expressive vocalist with absolute pitch. Critics describe his vocal theatricality as having a range from clear and soft to harsh and aggressive, depending on the genre sung. Jackson is the only recipient to ever receive Grammy Awards for three different genres of vocal performance as a soloist, winning Pop Vocal for "Thriller", Rock Vocal for "Beat It", and Rhythm and Blues Vocal with both "Billie Jean" and "Don't Stop 'Til You Get Enough". Bruce Swedien, his long-time sound engineer, emphasized that a critical element of their vocal recordings are of him and Jackson trying numerous approaches to rhythmic, emotional and technical distinctions to consummate a "sonic character". His stylings, such as common use of staccato, legato, falsetto as well as vocal hiccups, ad-libs, wailings and growls, are all signature to his sound.

Jackson sang from childhood, and over time his voice and vocal style changed. Between 1971 and 1975, it descended from boy soprano to lyric tenor. He was known for his intonation and vocal range. Through each music release, his vocal development and changes were positively narrated by music journalists. With Off the Wall in the late 1970s, Jackson's abilities in his coming-of-age period had Rolling Stone comparing his vocals to the "breathless, dreamy stutter" of Stevie Wonder, and wrote that "Jackson's feathery-timbred tenor [was] extraordinarily beautiful. It slides smoothly into a startling falsetto that's used very daringly." When Thriller was released in the early 1980s, Rolling Stone wrote that Jackson was singing in a "fully adult voice" that was "tinged by sadness". With the release of the introspective album Dangerous, The New York Times wrote that on some tracks "he gulps for breath, his voice quivers with anxiety or drops to a desperate whisper, hissing through clenched teeth" and he had a "wretched tone". When singing of brotherhood or self-esteem he would return to "smooth" vocals. Of Invincible, Rolling Stone wrote that Jackson still performed "exquisitely voiced rhythm tracks and vibrating vocal harmonies". Joseph Vogel noted Jackson's ability to use non-verbal sounds to express emotion. Neil McCormick wrote that Jackson's unorthodox singing style "was original and utterly distinctive".

=== Influences ===
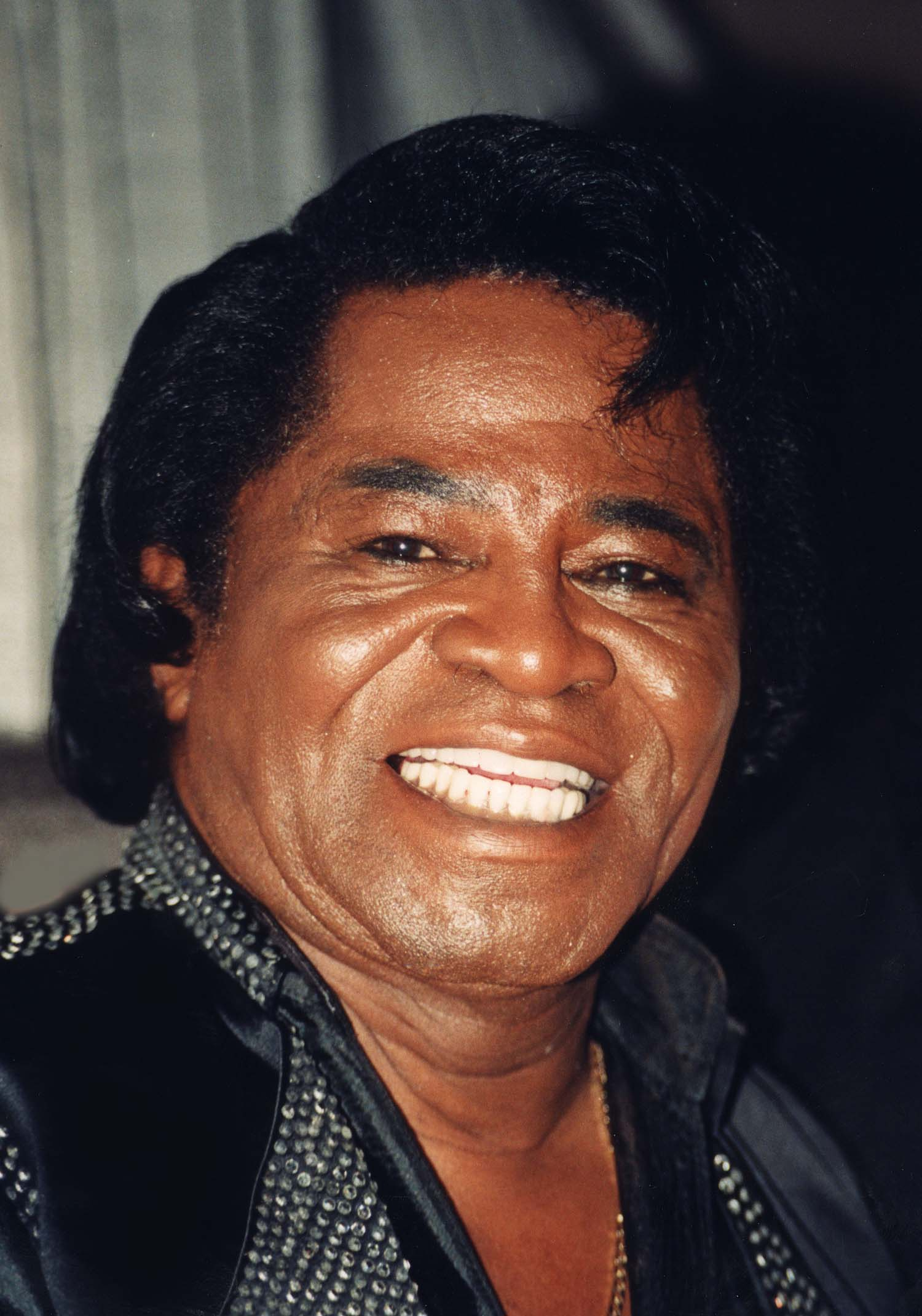
Jackson described James Brown as his "greatest inspiration", and watched him on television as a child.

Jackson was influenced by musicians including James Brown, Little Richard, Jackie Wilson, Diana Ross, Fred Astaire, Sammy Davis Jr., Gene Kelly, and David Ruffin. Little Richard had a substantial influence on Jackson, but Brown was his greatest inspiration. When Jackson was a small child, his mother would wake him whenever Brown appeared on television. Jackson described being "mesmerized".

Jackson's vocal technique was influenced by Diana Ross; his use of the oooh interjection from a young age was something Ross had used on many of her songs with the Supremes. She was a mother figure to him, and he often watched her rehearse. He said he had learned from watching how she moved and sang, and that she had encouraged him to have confidence in himself. The choreographer David Winters, who met Jackson while choreographing the 1971 Diana Ross TV special Diana!, said that Jackson watched the musical West Side Story almost every week and it was his favorite film. Jackson paid tribute to it in the "Beat It" and "Bad" videos.

=== Musicianship ===
Jackson had no formal music training and could not read or write music notation. He is credited for playing guitar, keyboard, and drums, but was not proficient in them. When composing, he recorded ideas by beatboxing and imitating instruments vocally. Describing the process, he said: "I'll just sing the bass part into the tape recorder. I'll take that bass lick and put the chords of the melody over the bass lick and that's what inspires the melody." The engineer Robert Hoffman recalled Jackson dictating guitar chords note by note and singing string arrangements part by part into a cassette recorder. Jackson's process is demonstrated in his demo for "Beat It".

=== Dance ===
Jackson danced from a young age as part of the Jackson 5, and incorporated dance extensively in his performances. According to Sanjoy Roy of The Guardian, Jackson would "flick and retract his limbs like switchblades, or snap out of a tornado spin into a perfectly poised toe-stand". The moonwalk, taught to him by Jeffrey Daniel, was Jackson's signature dance move and one of the most famous of the 20th century. Jackson is credited for coining the name "moonwalk" for this street dance move, previously known as the "backslide". His other moves included the robot, crotch grab, and the "anti-gravity" lean of the "Smooth Criminal" video.

=== Themes and genres ===
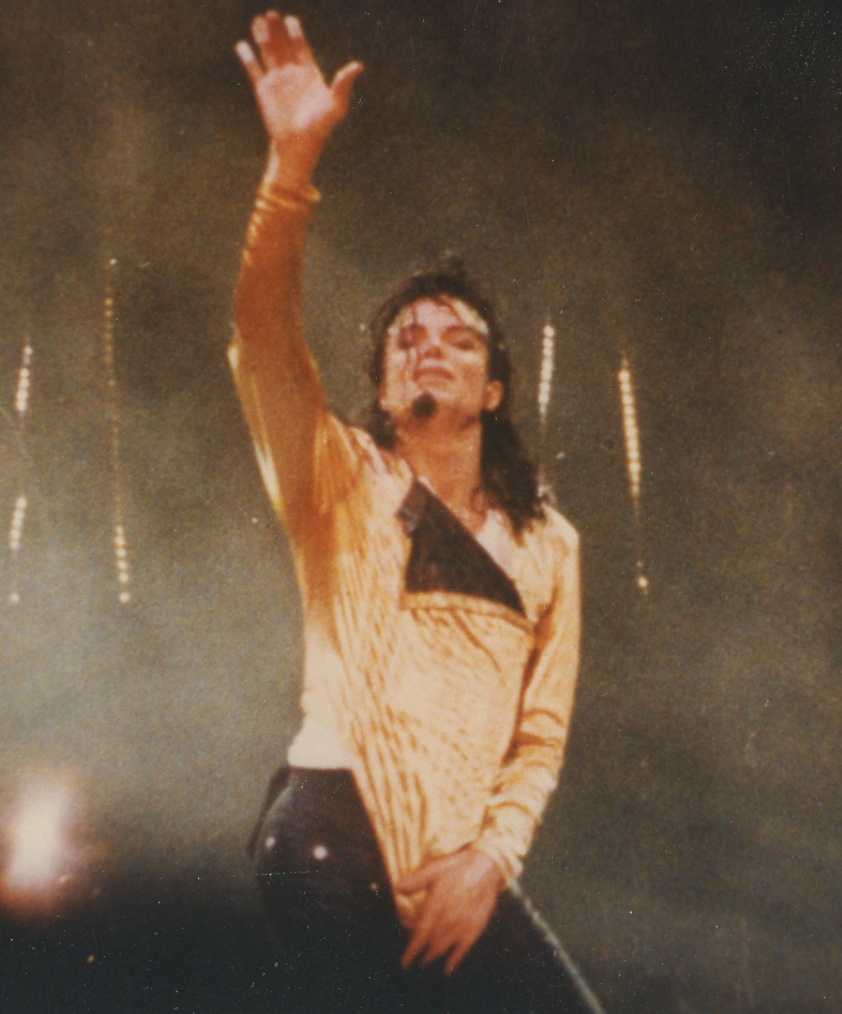
Jackson performing during the Dangerous World Tour in 1992

Jackson explored genres including pop, soul, rhythm and blues, funk, rock, disco, post-disco, dance-pop, and new jack swing. Steve Huey of AllMusic wrote that Thriller refined the strengths of Off the Wall; the dance and rock tracks were more aggressive, while the pop tunes and ballads were softer and more soulful. Its tracks included the ballads "The Lady in My Life", "Human Nature", and "The Girl Is Mine", the funk pieces "Billie Jean" and "Wanna Be Startin' Somethin'", and the disco set "Baby Be Mine" and "P.Y.T. (Pretty Young Thing)".

With Off the Wall, The Guardian's Tom Ewing wrote that Jackson's "vocal tics – the gasps and shudders that punctuate almost every song" evoke "a singer desperate to cut loose and express himself in movement". Christopher Connelly of Rolling Stone wrote that, with Thriller, Jackson developed his long association with the theme of paranoia and darker imagery. AllMusic's Stephen Thomas Erlewine noted this on the songs "Billie Jean" and "Wanna Be Startin' Somethin'". In "Billie Jean", Jackson depicts an obsessive fan who alleges he has fathered her child, and in "Wanna Be Startin' Somethin'" he argues against gossip and the media. "Beat It" decried gang violence in a homage to West Side Story, and was Jackson's first successful rock cross-over piece, according to Huey. He observed that "Thriller" began Jackson's interest with the theme of the supernatural, a topic he revisited in subsequent years. In 1985, Jackson co-wrote the charity anthem "We Are the World"; humanitarian themes later became a recurring theme in his lyrics and public persona.

In Bad, Jackson's concept of the predatory lover is seen on the rock song "Dirty Diana". The lead single "I Just Can't Stop Loving You" is a traditional love ballad, and "Man in the Mirror" is a ballad of confession and resolution. "Smooth Criminal" is an evocation of bloody assault, rape and likely murder. AllMusic's Stephen Thomas Erlewine states that Dangerous presents Jackson as a paradoxical person. The first half of the record is dedicated to new jack swing, including songs like "Jam" and "Remember the Time". It was the first Jackson album in which social ills became a primary theme; "Why You Wanna Trip on Me", for example, protests world hunger, AIDS, homelessness and drugs. Dangerous contains sexually charged songs such as "In the Closet". The title track continues the theme of the predatory lover and compulsive desire. The second half includes introspective, pop-gospel anthems such as "Will You Be There", "Heal the World", and "Keep the Faith". In the ballad "Gone Too Soon", Jackson gives tribute to Ryan White and the plight of those with AIDS.

HIStory creates an atmosphere of paranoia. In the new jack swing-funk rock tracks "Scream" and "Tabloid Junkie", and the R&B ballad "You Are Not Alone", Jackson retaliates against the injustice and isolation he feels, and directs his anger at the media. In the introspective ballad "Stranger in Moscow", Jackson laments his "fall from grace"; "Earth Song", "Childhood", "Little Susie", and "Smile" are operatic pop songs. In "D.S.", Jackson attacks lawyer Thomas W. Sneddon Jr., who had prosecuted him in both child sexual abuse cases; he describes Sneddon as a white supremacist who wanted to "get my ass, dead or alive". Invincible includes urban soul tracks such as "Cry" and "The Lost Children", ballads such as "Speechless", "Break of Dawn", and "Butterflies", and mixes hip-hop, pop, and R&B in "2000 Watts", "Heartbreaker", and "Invincible".

=== Music videos and choreography ===
Jackson released "Thriller", a 14-minute music video directed by John Landis, in 1983. The zombie-themed video "defined music videos and broke racial barriers" on MTV, which had launched two years earlier. Before Thriller, Jackson struggled to receive coverage on MTV, allegedly because he was African American. Pressure from CBS Records persuaded MTV to start showing "Billie Jean" and later "Beat It", which led to a lengthy partnership with Jackson, and helped other black music artists gain recognition. The popularity of his videos on MTV helped the relatively new channel's viewing figures, and MTV's focus shifted toward pop and R&B. His performance on Motown 25: Yesterday, Today, Forever changed the scope of live stage shows, making it acceptable for artists to lip-sync to music video on stage. The choreography in Thriller has been copied in Indian films and prisons in the Philippines. Thriller marked an increase in scale for music videos, and was named the most successful music video ever by the Guinness World Records.

In the 19-minute video for "Bad"—directed by Martin Scorsese—Jackson used sexual imagery and choreography, and touched his chest, torso and crotch. When asked by Winfrey in the 1993 interview about why he grabbed his crotch, he said it was spontaneously compelled by the music. Time magazine described the "Bad" video as "infamous". It featured Wesley Snipes; Jackson's later videos often featured famous cameos. For the "Smooth Criminal" video, Jackson experimented with leaning forward at a 45-degree angle, beyond the performer's center of gravity. To accomplish this live, Jackson and designers developed a special shoe to lock the performer's feet to the stage. They were granted U.S. patent 5,255,452 for the device. The video for "Leave Me Alone" was not officially released in the US, but in 1989 was nominated for three Billboard Music Video Awards and won a Golden Lion Award for its special effects. It won a Grammy for Best Music Video, Short Form.

He received the MTV Video Vanguard Award in 1988; in 2001 the award was renamed in his honor. The "Black or White" video simultaneously premiered on November 14, 1991, in 27 countries with an estimated audience of 500 million people, the largest audience ever for a music video at the time. Along with Jackson, it featured Macaulay Culkin, Peggy Lipton, and George Wendt. It helped introduce morphing to music videos. It was controversial for scenes in which Jackson rubs his crotch, vandalizes cars, and throws a garbage can through a storefront. He apologized and removed the final scene of the video.

"In the Closet" featured Naomi Campbell in a courtship dance with Jackson. "Remember the Time" was set in ancient Egypt, and featured Eddie Murphy, Iman, and Magic Johnson. The video for "Scream", directed by Mark Romanek and production designer Tom Foden, gained a record 11 MTV Video Music Award Nominations, and won "Best Dance Video", "Best Choreography", and "Best Art Direction". The song and its video are Jackson's response to being accused of child molestation in 1993. A year later, it won a Grammy for Best Music Video, Short Form. It has been reported as the most expensive music video ever made, at $7 million; Romanek has contradicted this. The "Earth Song" video was nominated for the 1997 Grammy for Best Music Video, Short Form.

Michael Jackson's Ghosts, a short film written by Jackson and Stephen King and directed by Stan Winston, premiered at the 1996 Cannes Film Festival. At over 38 minutes, it held the Guinness world record for the longest music video until 2013. The 2001 video for "You Rock My World" lasts over 13 minutes, was directed by Paul Hunter, and features Chris Tucker and Marlon Brando. It won an NAACP Image Award for Outstanding Music Video in 2002.

In December 2009, the Library of Congress selected "Thriller" as the only music video on the National Film Registry, as a work of "enduring importance to American culture". Huey wrote that Jackson transformed the music video into an artform and a promotional tool through complex story lines, dance routines, special effects and famous cameos, while breaking down racial barriers.

== Awards and honors ==
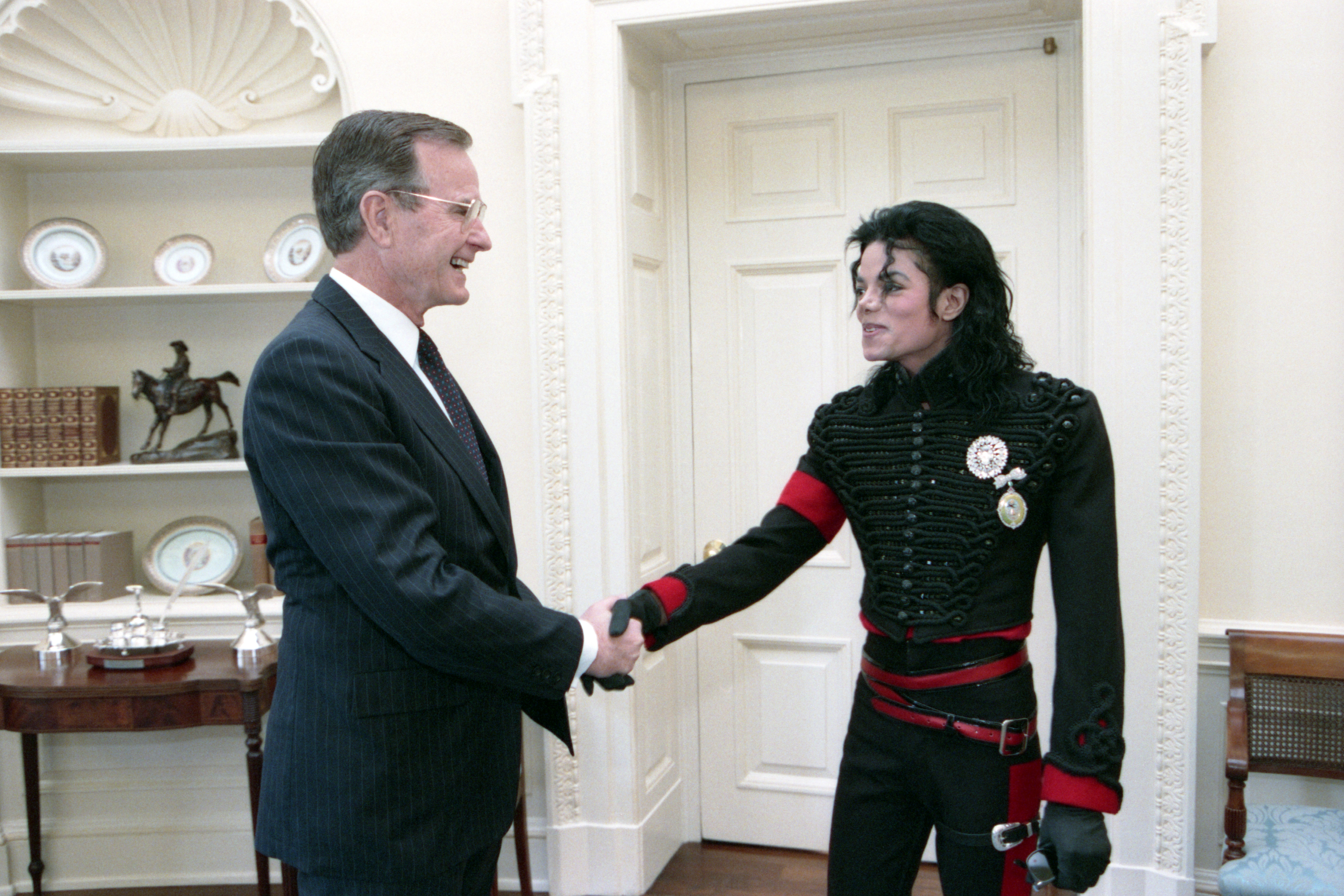
Jackson and President George H. W. Bush at the White House on April 5, 1990. It was the second time that Jackson had been honored by a US president.

Jackson is one of the best-selling music artists in history, with worldwide record sales estimated from 500 million to more than 1 billion.^{[Note 2]} He had 13 number-one singles in the US over his solo career—more than any other male artist in the Hot 100 era at the time of his death. Jackson is one of only three recording artists who have sold over 100 million records both as solo artists and separately as principal members of a band. He was invited to the White House three times. In 1984, he was honored with a "Presidential Public Safety Commendation" award by Ronald Reagan for his humanitarian endeavors. In 1990, he was honored as the "Artist of the Decade", which was awarded by the National Children's Museum, by George H. W. Bush. In 1992, he was honored as a "Point of Light Ambassador" by Bush for inviting disadvantaged children to his Neverland Ranch.

Jackson won hundreds of awards and is one of the most-awarded artists in popular music. His awards include 39 Guinness World Records, including the Most Successful Entertainer of All Time, 13 Grammy Awards, as well as the Grammy Legend Award and the Grammy Lifetime Achievement Award, and 26 American Music Awards, including the Artist of the Century and Artist of the 1980s. He received the World Music Awards's Best Selling Male Artist of the Millennium and the Bambi Pop Artist of the Millennium Award.

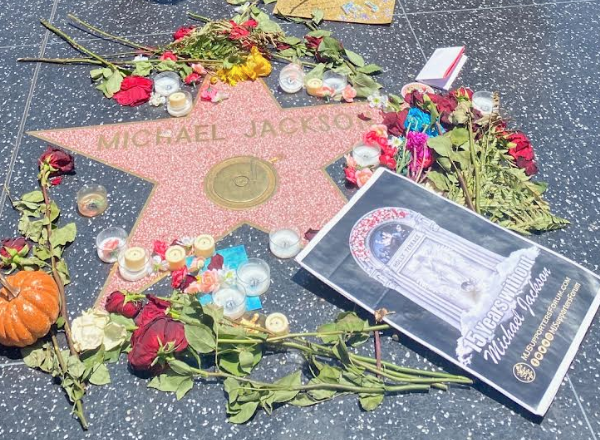
Jackson's star on the Hollywood Walk of Fame on the occasion of the 15th anniversary of his death

Jackson was inducted onto the Hollywood Walk of Fame in 1980 as a member of the Jacksons, and in 1984 as a solo artist. He was inducted to the Rock and Roll Hall of Fame and Vocal Group Hall of Fame as a member of the Jackson 5 in 1997 and 1999, respectively, and again as a solo artist in 2001. In 2002, he was added to the Songwriters Hall of Fame. In 2010, he became the first recording artist to be inducted into the Dance Hall of Fame, and in 2014, he was posthumously inducted into the Rhythm and Blues Music Hall of Fame. In 2021, he was among the inaugural inductees into the Black Music & Entertainment Walk of Fame.

In 1988, Fisk University honored him with an honorary doctorate. In 1992, he was invested as a titular king of Sanwi, a traditional African kingdom. In 2009, the Lunar Republic Society named a crater on the Moon after Jackson. In August, for what would have been Jackson's 51st birthday, Google dedicated their Google Doodle to him. In 2012, the extinct hermit crab Mesoparapylocheles michaeljacksoni was named in his honor. In 2014, the British Council of Cultural Relations deemed Jackson's life one of the 80 most important cultural moments of the 20th century. World Vitiligo Day is June 25, the anniversary of Jackson's death, to raise awareness of the auto-immune disorder that Jackson suffered from.

== Earnings ==
In 1989, Jackson's annual earnings from album sales, endorsements, and concerts were estimated at $125 million. Forbes placed Jackson's annual income at $35 million in 1996 and $20 million in 1997. Jackson has been one of the wealthiest celebrities and musical artists; estimates of Jackson's net worth during his life range from negative $285 million to positive $350 million for 2002, 2003 and 2007. Forbes reported in August 2018 that Jackson's total career pretax earnings in life and death were $4.2 billion. Sales of his recordings through Sony's music unit earned him an estimated $300 million in royalties. He may have earned another $400 million from concerts, music publishing (including his share of the Beatles catalog), endorsements, merchandising and music videos.

In 2013, the executors of Jackson's estate filed a petition in the United States Tax Court as a result of a dispute with the Internal Revenue Service (IRS) over estate taxes. The executors valued it at about $7 million, while the IRS valued it at more than $1.1 billion. In February 2014, the IRS reported that Jackson's estate owed $505 million in taxes, and $197 million in penalties. In 2021, the Tax Court issued a ruling in favor of the estate, ruling that the estate's total combined value was $111.5 million and that the value of Jackson's name and likeness was $4 million.

In 2016, Forbes estimated annual gross earnings by the Jackson estate at $825 million, the largest ever for a celebrity, mostly due to the sale of the Sony/ATV catalog. In 2018, the figure was $400 million, and by 2024, it rose to $600 million, bringing Jackson's postmortem total to $3.3 billion. Forbes has consistently recognized Jackson as one of the top-earning dead celebrities, placing him at the top spot from 2010 to 2024, except for 2012, 2021, and 2022.

== Discography ==
- Got to Be There (1972)
- Ben (1972)
- Music & Me (1973)
- Forever, Michael (1975)
- Off the Wall (1979)
- Thriller (1982)
- Bad (1987)
- Dangerous (1991)
- HIStory: Past, Present and Future, Book I (1995)
- Invincible (2001)

== Filmography ==
- The Wiz (1978)
- Michael Jackson's Thriller (1983)
- Captain EO (1986)
- Moonwalker (1988)
- Michael Jackson: The Legend Continues (1989)
- Michael Jackson's Ghosts (1997)
- Men in Black II (2002)
- Miss Cast Away and the Island Girls (2004)
- Michael Jackson's This Is It (2009)
- Bad 25 (2012)
- Michael Jackson's Journey from Motown to Off the Wall (2016)
- Thriller 40 (2023)

== Tours ==
- Bad World Tour (1987–1989)
- Dangerous World Tour (1992–1993)
- HIStory World Tour (1996–1997)

== See also ==
- Personal relationships of Michael Jackson
- List of artists influenced by Michael Jackson
- List of American Grammy Award winners and nominees
- List of dancers
