= Mijac Music =

Music catalogue

The Mijac Music catalogue is a music catalogue founded by American singer-songwriter Michael Jackson in 1980. It comprises songs written by Michael Jackson, as well as notable songs performed by Jackson and other artists, including Sly and the Family Stone, Kenneth Gamble, and Leon Huff. The catalogue also includes songs made famous by other artists such as Ray Charles, Elvis Presley, and Aretha Franklin.

== History ==
The publishing rights to the Michael Jackson Mijac catalog were managed by Warner-Chappell from its inception in 1980. In 2005, the catalogue's value was reported to be at least $75 million. Following Jackson's death in 2009, the catalogue's value was estimated to be between $50 million and $100 million, rising to $150 million within a year, according to Billboard.

In 2010, John Branca, the executor of Jackson's estate, moved the catalogue from Warner-Chappell to Sony Music Entertainment, granting Sony the rights to administration for 7 years in a deal worth $250 million. This agreement was renewed in 2018 for an additional 7 years, again for $250 million.

== Ownership ==
As of 2024, Michael Jackson's estate holds a 90% share of the catalogue, while Primary Wave Music holds the remaining 10%. In 2024, the estate sold half of Jackson's stake in Mijac Music to Sony Music Entertainment for $600 million, marking the largest deal for a single music artist's assets to date.
