= Ed Novitsky =

American music historian (1929–2020)

Edward Novitsky
- Born: December 24, 1929
- Died: January 8, 2020 (aged 90)
- Occupations: Music historian, discographer, recording archivist
- Spouse: Virginia Lee (Arends) Novitsky
- Parents: Thomas Novitsky; Edna Kaminsky

Edward (Ed) Novitsky (December 24, 1929 - January 8, 2020) was an American music historian, discographer and recording archivist. He is highly regarded in the music research community for his meticulous work documenting the extensive catalogs, matrix numbers, master recordings and session histories of major American record labels.

Novitsky's work has contributed to the preservation and documentation of recorded-music history, particularly material from the mid-20th century. His name appears on major reference works used by researchers, collectors, historians, record companies and discographers. His research has focused particularly on recording sessions, master numbers, release numbers, personnel, recording dates, labels, formats and the relationship between recordings and subsequent commercial releases. Sets of his work are held and used by the Smithsonian Institution's Libraries and Archives.

In 1994, Novitsky and collaborator Michael Ruppli earned the ARSC Awards for Excellence in the Record Labels or Manufacturers category for a discography of The Mercury Labels published by Greenwood Press in 1993.

== Collaborations ==
Novitsky collaborated with several writers throughout his career. Notoriously private, he gave no interviews.

In the early 1990s Novitsky and Michael Ruppli collaborated to produce The Mercury Label: A Discography published by Greenwood Press in 1993. This five-volume set covered the years 1945 to 1991, along with an index of the records and artists included.

In 1998 Novitsky and Ruppli published the MGM Labels: A discography through Greenwood Press. The three volume set covered the years 1946–1982.

In 2005, along with William Daniels, they published a CD-ROM titled The Capitol Label, Names and Numbers. The contents include recording sessions, personnel, locations, recording dates, master numbers, issue numbers and releases in multiple formats. The Capitol project represents a continuation of the methodology developed through Novitsky's earlier Mercury and MGM research: treating commercial recordings as historical documents whose creation and publication can be reconstructed through systematic examination of catalog and session information.

A large collection associated with Novitsky became the basis of an archival preservation and cataloguing project described as the Ed Novitsky Music & Art Archive.

== Legacy ==
The Mercury, MGM and Capitol projects collectively document an enormous amount of postwar recorded music. The Mercury series alone covers more than four decades and multiple subsidiary labels, while the MGM series reconstructs the company's recordings from 1946 through 1982. The Capitol discography extends the same type of documentation to another major American record company.

Novitsky's work occupies a space between archivists and collector. Traditional music histories often emphasize artists, genres, performances and cultural movements. Discography adds another level of documentation: the physical and commercial history of individual recordings.

== Personal life ==
Novitsky was born on December 24, 1929, to Thomas and Edna (Kaminsky) Novitsky in Mt. Carmel, Pennsylvania. He was one of six children.

Novitsky married Virginia Lee Arends on November 11, 1950. The couple had two daughters and two sons. They were married 68 years when she died in May 2019.

Novitsky served in the United States Air Force for 30 years, reaching the rank of Chief Master Sergeant. His service took him all over the world. After leaving the Air Force he worked for the United Postal Service.

Novitsky was a member of the Elks Lodge 1079 for 40 years.

Novitsky died on January 8, 2020, at his home in Orlando, Florida.

== Bibliography ==
- The Mercury Label: A Discography (1993) Greenwood Press
- The MGM Labels: A discography (1998) Greenwood Press
- The Capitol Label, Names and Numbers. (2005) CD-ROM
