= Music catalog =

Collection of musical compositions

In the music industry, a collection of musical compositions is cataloged into a music catalog. The owner owns the copyrights of the cataloged compositions. In libraries, a music catalog includes both printed and recorded music.

== See also ==
- Catalogues of classical compositions
- Commission (art)
- History of music publishing
- Music library
- Music publisher
- Patronage
- Thematic catalogue
- Repertoire
