= List of Michael Jackson concerts =

Concerts by American singer-songwriter Michael Jackson

Michael Jackson live performances
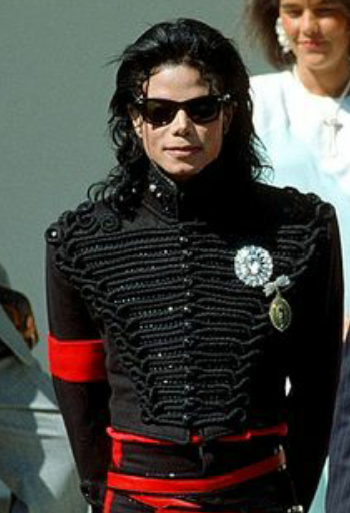
- Jackson at the White House in 1990
- Concert tours: 3
- Benefit concerts: 4
- Television specials: 2

American singer Michael Jackson (1958–2009) performed on three concert tours, and three benefit concerts.

Having toured with his brothers since the early 1970s, Jackson began his first solo world tour, the Bad World Tour, in support of his seventh studio album Bad (released on August 31, 1987) on September 12, 1987. Beginning in Tokyo, Japan, the tour lasted for 1 year, during which Jackson visited 15 countries and performed to 4.4 million people. Attendance figures for the first 14 dates in Japan totaled a record-breaking 450,000. The most successful of the European dates were those in London at Wembley Stadium, where demand for the five July dates exceeded 1.5 million, enough to fill the 72,000-capacity venue 20 times. Jackson went on to perform seven sold-out shows at Wembley for a total of 504,000 people which entered him into the Guinness World Records, setting a new world record for playing more dates at the stadium than any other artist. The third concert was attended by Diana, Princess of Wales and Prince Charles, where Michael debated performing Dirty Diana,subsequently released as Live at Wembley July 16, 1988. The final European show was held in Liverpool at Aintree Racecourse, where 1,550 fans were reported injured among the crowd of 125,000, the largest show of the tour. Jackson toured the United States for a second time between September 1988 and January 1989, with a return to Japan for nine sold-out shows in Tokyo Dome for a total of 450,000 people in December. The Bad World Tour grossed a total of US$125 million, earning two new entries in the Guinness World Records for the largest grossing tour in history and the tour with the largest attended audience. It was nominated for "Tour of the Year 1988" at the inaugural International Rock Awards. The Bad World Tour was the second highest-grossing tour of the 1980s after Pink Floyd's Momentary Lapse of Reason Tour. Jackson also performed at the 30th Annual Grammy awards in 1988 performing his then hit singles Man in the Mirror and The Way You Make Me Feel being nominated for Grammy Award for Album of the Year and Grammy Award for Best Engineered album, Non classical.

The follow-up concert series—the Dangerous World Tour—began in Munich, Germany, on June 27, 1992, and concluded in Mexico City, Mexico, on November 11, 1993, playing 69 concerts in Europe, Asia and Latin America. At the end, the tour grossed over $100 million and was attended by up to 4,000,000 people. All profits were donated to various charities including Jackson's own Heal the World Foundation. The October 1, 1992, concert in Bucharest, Romania was filmed for broadcast on the HBO network on October 10. Jackson sold the film rights for the concert for $20 million, the then highest amount for a concert performer to appear on television. The special, Live in Bucharest: The Dangerous Tour, earned Jackson the second of two CableACE Awards of his career, this one for Outstanding Performance Musical Special. On July 16, 1996, Jackson performed for Sultan Hassanal Bolkiah's fiftieth birthday at Jerudong Park Amphitheater in Brunei, which was specifically built for the birthday concert. Jackson was reportedly paid $17 million (equivalent to $35 million in 2025). In September 1996, Jackson returned with the HIStory World Tour, an 82 run of concerts that concluded the following year. The tour would promote the HIStory: Past, Present and Future, Book I album, which was released in June 1995. Starting on May 31, 1997, the tour would also promote Jackson's newly released single, "Blood on the Dance Floor", which was released in March 1997. The concert series attracted more than 4.5 million fans from 58 cities in 35 countries around the world. It was the most attended tour of all time by any artist, having grossed over $165 million. The average concert attendance was 54,878. In June 1999, Jackson joined Luciano Pavarotti for a War Child benefit concert in Modena, Italy. The show raised a million dollars for refugees of the Kosovo War, and additional funds for the children of Guatemala. Later that month, Jackson organized a series of MJ & Friends benefit concerts in Germany and Korea. Other artists involved included Slash, the Scorpions, Boyz II Men, Luther Vandross, Mariah Carey, A. R. Rahman, Prabhu Deva Sundaram, Shobana, Andrea Bocelli and Luciano Pavarotti. The proceeds went to the Nelson Mandela Children's Fund, the Red Cross and UNESCO.

In March 2009, Jackson announced a series of comeback concerts, This Is It, at a press conference at the O2 Arena. The initial plan was for ten concerts in London, followed by shows in Paris, New York City, and Mumbai. The London residency was increased to fifty dates after record-breaking ticket sales; more than 1.5 million fans caused two sites offering pre-sale tickets to crash within minutes of going online. In the space of four hours, 750,000 tickets were sold. Two million people tried to buy pre-sale tickets in the space of 18 hours. AEG Live estimated that the first 10 concerts would have earned Jackson approximately £50 million. Joe Cohen, chief executive of Seatwave, told BBC 6 Music that the shows would generate £1 billion for the economy. While preparing for the concerts, Jackson died from an overdose of propofol administered by his personal physician, Conrad Murray. Michael Jackson is the highest-grossing solo touring artist of the 20th century.

== Concert tours and residencies ==
Title	Date	MJ's associated albums	Region(s)	Shows	Attendance	Average attendance per concert	Gross	Gross adj. in 2025	Ref.
Bad World Tour	September 12, 1987 – January 27, 1989	Bad; Thriller; Off the Wall	Europe; Asia; North America; Australia	123	4,400,000	35,772	$125,000,000	$340,285,594	
Dangerous World Tour	June 27, 1992 – November 11, 1993	Dangerous; Bad; Thriller; Off the Wall	Europe; Asia; Latin America	69	3,757,000	54,449	$100,000,000	$222,874,914	
HIStory World Tour	September 7, 1996 – October 15, 1997	HIStory: Past, Present and Future, Book I Blood on the Dance Floor: HIStory in the Mix	Africa; Asia; Europe; North America; Oceania	82	4,500,000	54,878	$165,000,000	$330,923,507	
Michael Jackson & Friends	June 25–27, 1999	Summary of his career	Asia; Europe	2	137,000	68,500	$3,300,000	$6,420,000	
Michael Jackson: 30th Anniversary Celebration	September 7–10, 2001	Summary of his career	North America	2	44,000	22,000	$10,072,105	$19,466,164	
This Is It	July 13, 2009 – March 6, 2010 (planned)	Summary of his career	Europe	50 (planned)	1,000,000	20,000	$85,000,000	$127,559,330	

== Award shows ==
Title	Date	Location
American Music Awards of 1993	January 25, 1993	Los Angeles, California
The American Music Awards was the first live performance of Dangerous.
Title	Date	Location
1995 MTV Video Music Awards	September 7, 1995	New York City
This award show took place exactly 1 year before the beginning of the History Tour. It was one of his most iconic performances. This award show also marked the first performance Michael Jackson had ever done since the end of the Dangerous World Tour which concluded at the end of 1993.
Title	Date	Location
Soul Train Hall of Fame 25th Anniversary	November 22, 1995	Los Angeles, California
A performance that Jackson undertook to solidify his name in the Hall of Fame.
Title	Date	Location
2006 World Music Awards	November 15, 2006	London
This award show was Jacksons final live performance in which he sang We Are the World.

== Benefit concerts ==
Title	Date	Location	Number of performances
The Royal Concert	July 16, 1996	Brunei	1
The concert was held in celebration of the 50th birthday of Hassanal Bolkiah, the Sultan of Brunei, and was attended by the Brunei royal family. Jackson was reportedly paid a sum in the region of $17 million for the performance.
MJ & Friends	June 25–27, 1999	South Korea, Germany	2
A tour intended to help raise funds for children in Kosovo, Africa and elsewhere. Jackson gave two concerts during the tour. The first one took place in Seoul, South Korea on June 25, and the second one was in Munich, Germany. Jackson was joined by long-time collaborator Slash during the two concerts.
New Year's Eve 2000 concerts	December 31, 1999 – January 1, 2000 (cancelled)	Australia, United States	2
In 1999, it was announced that Jackson planned to headline two concerts on New Year's Eve 1999 to mark the new millennium, beginning with an event in Sydney, and then travelling to a second event at Aloha Stadium in Honolulu, United States later in the day, as part of the MJ & Friends concerts. As Hawaii is 20 hours behind Australia and on the other side of the International Date Line, the intent of the concerts were to have Jackson perform in one of the first countries to celebrate the new year, and then one of the last. However, in October, it was announced that the twin shows had been cancelled, with his promoter stating that Jackson did not want to disrupt ongoing work on his next album. Critics also doubted if Jackson would be able to make his flight in time due to Australia's flight curfews.
United We Stand: What More Can I Give	October 21, 2001	United States	1
After the September 11 attacks, Jackson helped organize the United We Stand: What More Can I Give benefit concert at RFK Stadium in Washington, D.C. on October 21, 2001. The special premiered on ABC on Thursday, November 1, 2001.
Michael Jackson: Live at the Apollo 2002	April 24, 2002	United States	1
The concert was performed at the Apollo Theater in New York City on April 24, 2002. The concert was a fundraiser for the Democratic National Committee and former President Bill Clinton. The money collected would be used to encourage citizens to vote. It raised almost $3 million.

== Television specials ==
Title	Date	Location	Number of performances
Motown 25: Yesterday, Today, Forever	March 25, 1983	Pasadena, California	1
Motown 25: Yesterday, Today, Forever was a 1983 television special to commemorate Motown's 25th anniversary. The program was taped before a live audience at the Pasadena Civic Auditorium in Pasadena, California on March 25, 1983, and broadcast on NBC on May 16 to an estimated audience of 47 million, and the solo performance of "Billie Jean" earned Jackson his first Emmy Award nomination. This was the first time Jackson performed what would become his most famous signature move, the moonwalk.
Wetten, dass..? special appearance	November 4, 1995	Duisburg	1
Michael Jackson: 30th Anniversary Celebration	September 7–10, 2001	New York City	2
The purpose of the performances was to mark Jackson's thirtieth anniversary as a solo performer. Both concerts took place at Madison Square Garden in New York City. This would be Jackson's final public performance with his brothers. The show was watched by 30 million viewers on CBS when it aired later the same year. The shows sold out in 2 hours. Ticket prices were among the most expensive ever for an event; the best seats cost $10,000 and included a dinner with Jackson and a signed poster. Jackson reportedly earned $7.5 million for each of the two concerts. The concert's official box-office taking was $10,072,105 for both concerts.

== See also ==
- List of concert tours by the Jackson 5
- List of most-attended concert tours
- List of highest-attended concerts
- List of highest-grossing concert tours
