= Heal Los Angeles Foundation =

American charitable organization

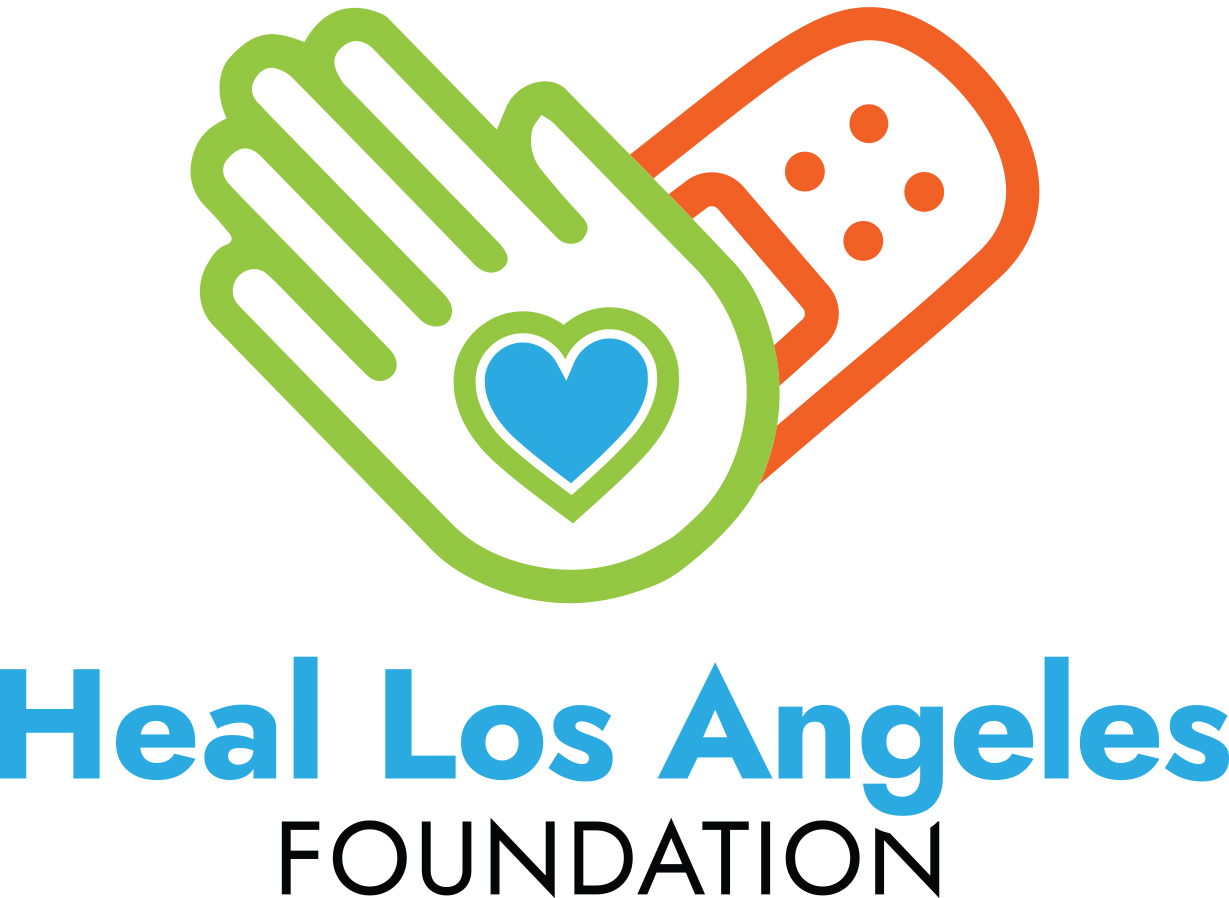
- Formation: 2016; 10 years ago
- Founder: Michael Joseph Jackson Jr. and John Muto
- Type: Charity
- Purpose: Helping inner-city youth in Los Angeles
- Location: Los Angeles, California, US
- Official language: English
- Website: heallafdn.com

Heal Los Angeles Foundation is a nonprofit organization and charitable organization in Los Angeles, California co-founded by philanthropist Prince Jackson and John Muto. The foundation collaborates with other charity foundations to bring inner-city youth toys, food, and educational tools. They host an annual charitable Halloween costume party they call "Thriller Night".

== Background ==
Heal Los Angeles Foundation started as a student service organization at Loyola Marymount University in Los Angeles, in 2016 when Prince Jackson met John Muto. Inspired by Jackson's father, Michael Jackson's philanthropic work, they looked for ways to help underserved communities. The creation of Heal LA was structured after the Heal the World Foundation. The foundation's slogan is "make that change."

== Fundraising ==
Prince Jackson received a Motif Lifetime Medal of Honor for his work with Heal Los Angeles in 2018.

Heal Los Angeles Foundation's ambassadors are founders Jackson and Muto, artist Paris Jackson, actor Chris Tucker, artist Omer Bhatti, Marie Claire's US creative director Wanyi Jiang, and interviewer Liam McEwan. Heal Los Angeles and its ambassadors donated meals to frontline hospital workers during the COVID-19 pandemic in Los Angeles. In May 2020, the foundation with LA based company Fresh N Lean and the Gospel Mission Baptist Church, handed out more than 5,000 free meals to 800 households during the pandemic. The foundation also help kids from vulnerable areas and organize free turkey giveaways for Thanksgiving.

In 2020, the charity organization and the Los Angeles Police Baseball Foundation brought toys, holiday shopping sprees, and educational initiative and tools to inner-city youth.

In June 2023, Alfred García won the tenth season of Tu cara me suena with his performance of Michael Jackson's "Billie Jean". He donated the proceeds to Heal Los Angeles Foundation.

The foundation has also launched a Career Day initiative, guiding families and their children to different career paths. In 2024, Heal Los Angeles joined forces with Charitybuzz auctioning off a role in the upcoming Michael Jackson biopic Michael.

=== Thriller Night events ===
"Thriller Night" events are annual Halloween parties that takes place at the Jackson family's Hayvenhurst compound in Encino, Los Angeles. These charitable events benefit the Heal Los Angeles Foundation, the Dee Dee Jackson Foundation and the LA Police Baseball Foundation.

On October 25, 2019, Prince hosted the 3rd annual event together with his brother, Prince Michael Jackson II, also known as Bigi. They transformed the property into a haunted house. Guests included their cousins and extended family members.

The 2020 event guests included Heal Los Angeles foundation's ambassadors Chris Tucker, Jackson family fans, other members of the Jackson family and Omarion, who provided a virtual performance.

On October 29, 2021, Prince's brother, Bigi, and their cousin Taj, son of Tito Jackson, designed the haunted house for the event. Chris Tucker delivered a stand-up comedy show, and Elijah Blake performed. A Legacy Room featuring Michael Jackson's costumes from the "Thriller" and Michael Jackson's Ghosts videos, along with some of his awards, was opened for the guests.

During the 2022 event, and the 40th anniversary of Michael's Thriller album, Chris Tucker and Steve Harvey were honored and received the inaugural "Man in The Mirror" Award. The award is given to influential individuals using their platforms for good. Tucker and Harvey accepted the award that was presented by Prince Jackson. Guests included Michael's other two children, Paris Jackson and Bigi. Norwegian illusionist Alexx Alexxander attended the event, he was invited by Prince to perform. Vanessa Hudgens also attended the event.

== See also ==
- Philanthropy of Michael Jackson
- Heal the World Foundation
