= Philanthropy of Michael Jackson =

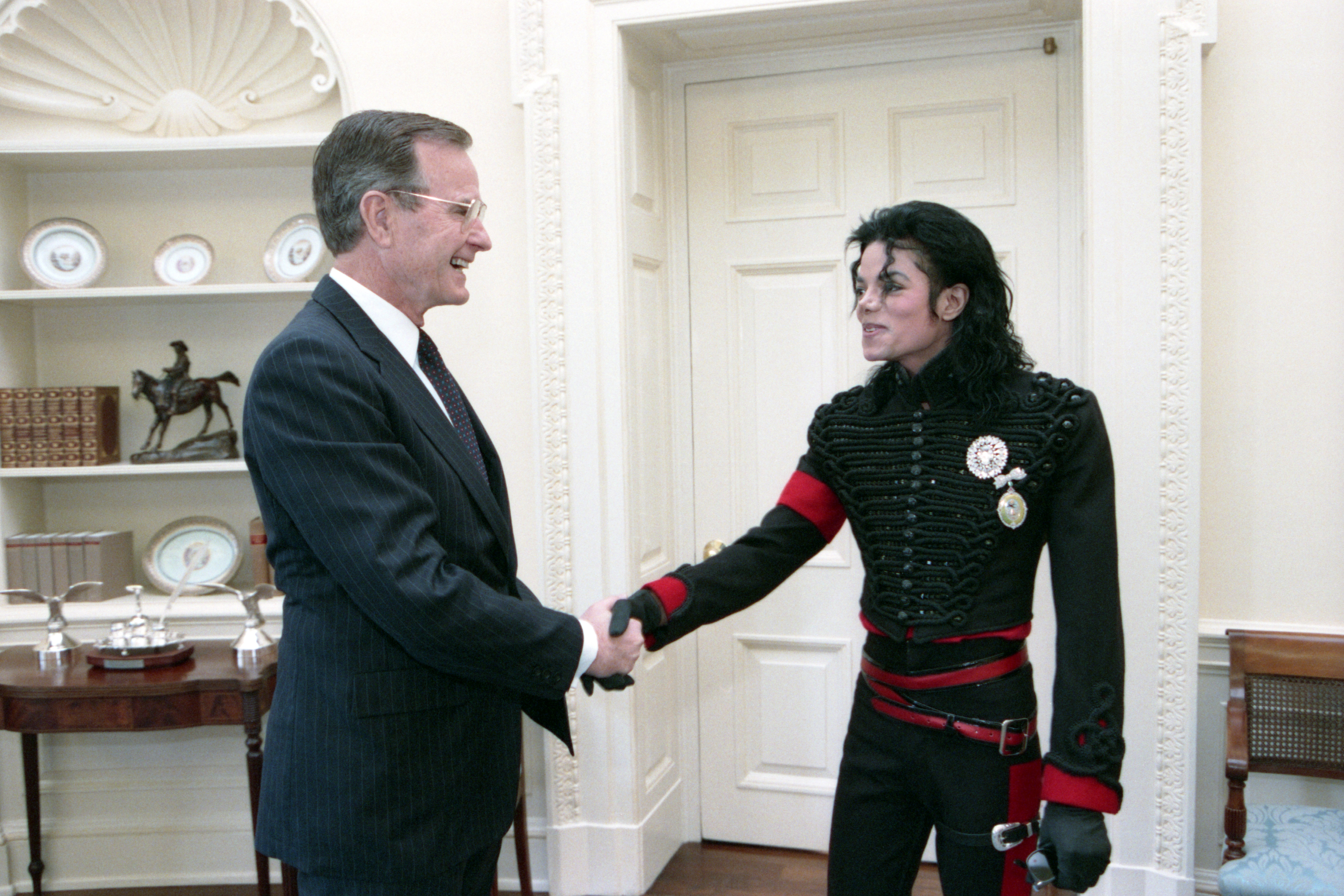
Jackson at the White House with President George H. W. Bush and First Lady Barbara Bush on 5 April 1990

American singer Michael Jackson left a lasting legacy as a prolific philanthropist and humanitarian. Throughout his public life, Jackson dedicated himself to various humanitarian causes, particularly in areas regarding poverty, disease, welfare, and disadvantaged youth. Jackson's early charitable work has been described by The Chronicle of Philanthropy as having "paved the way for the current surge in celebrity philanthropy", and by the Los Angeles Times as having "set the standard for generosity for other entertainers". By some estimates, he donated over $500 million to charity over the course of his life, at one time being recognized in Guinness World Records for the breadth of his philanthropic work.

The actual amount of donations made by Jackson may be even higher, but the exact amount is not known since Jackson often gave anonymously and without fanfare. In addition to supporting a substantial number of charities established by others, in 1992 Jackson established the Heal the World Foundation, to which he donated several million dollars in revenue from his Dangerous World Tour.

Aside from monetary donations, Jackson's philanthropic activities also included performing in benefit concerts and giving away tickets for regular concert performances to groups aiding underprivileged children, making hospital visits to sick children and opening his home for visits, with attention to providing special facilities and nurses if the children needed that level of care. He also donated valuable personal and professional paraphernalia for numerous charity auctions. Jackson received various awards and accolades for his philanthropic work, including two bestowed by presidents of the United States.

== History ==
=== 1970s and 1980s ===
==== Early activities ====
Born in 1958, Jackson began engaging in philanthropic and humanitarian efforts while still a member of The Jackson 5 and received early recognition by the time he was thirteen. His philanthropic efforts expanded and grew substantially as he stepped out as a solo artist. In December 1978, Jackson "spread Christmas joy among 200 youngsters at the Hollywood Children's Hospital", throwing them a party and giving away autographed posters. The Telegraph noted of Jackson that "[o]ne of his earliest charitable ventures was in 1979, when he donated books, including Peter Pan, to the Chicago Public Library and promoted reading through a programme he called Boogie to the Book Beat". In July 1981, Jackson led a benefit concert at the Omni Auditorium in Atlanta, Georgia, raised $100,000 for the Atlanta Children's Foundation, to aid the poor children of the city in the wake of a string of child kidnappings and murders there. The Jacksons had originally been scheduled to perform a tour date in Atlanta on that day, but reworked the date into a benefit concert in light of the ongoing crisis.

Later on in the 1980s, Jackson was noted for his support for alcohol and drug abuse charities, and the Ad Council's and the National Highway Traffic Safety Administration's Drunk Driving Prevention campaign. Jackson allowed the campaign to use "Beat It" for its public service announcements. For his efforts in this area, he garnered praise from President Ronald Reagan, and was welcomed at the White House for a ceremony on May 14, 1984 at which Michael was presented with the Presidential Humanitarian Award.

==== Mid-1980s ====
The Victory Tour of 1984 headlined the Jacksons as a group, and showcased Michael's new solo material to more than two million Americans. It was the last tour he did with his brothers. Following controversy over the concert's ticket sales, Jackson donated his entire share of the proceeds, an estimated $3 to 5 million, to charity. Following an incident in 1984 in which Jackson received second and third degree burns to his scalp while filming a commercial for the tour's sponsor, Pepsi, he donated his $1.5 million settlement from Pepsi to the hospital where he had been treated, Brotman Medical Center in Culver City, California; its Michael Jackson Burn Center was named in his honor. Notably, even before this incident, Jackson had made multiple visits to patients in the burn unit and elsewhere in the hospital, stating that "it makes me feel good to cheer up sick and injured patients in the hospital". Jackson also donated funds from the Victory Tour to several charities, equipping a 19 bed unit at the Mount Sinai New York Medical Center, which is part of the T.J. Martell Foundation for Leukemia and Cancer Research, and enabling Camp Ronald McDonald for Good Times to build a year-round camp facility for children living with cancer.

His charitable work reached new heights with the release of "We Are the World" (1985), co-written with Lionel Richie, which raised money for the poor in the US and Africa. It earned $63 million, and became one of the best-selling singles of all time, with 20 million copies sold. The project's creators received two special American Music Awards honors: one for the creation of the song and another for the USA for Africa idea. Jackson, producer Quincy Jones, and promoter Ken Kragen received special awards for their roles in the song's creation. In 1988, it was described as "the humanitarian effort Michael considers his greatest personal triumph". Humanitarian themes later became a recurring theme in his lyrics and public persona.

From 1985 to 1990, Jackson made substantial donations to the United Negro College Fund (UNCF), endowing $1.5 million to that organization in 1986 to set up the "Michael Jackson UNCF Endowed Scholarship Fund", aimed toward assisting students majoring in performance arts and communications, with money given each year to students attending a UNCF member college or university. Another benefit concert held by Jackson later in the decade brought an estimated $500,000 more for UNCF scholarships.

==== Bad tour ====
Yoshiaki Ogiwara, a five-year-old boy from Takasaki, Gunma, Japan, was kidnapped and murdered in September 1987; Jackson was undertaking his "Bad" tour in Japan at the time, and dedicated concerts in Osaka and Yokohama to Yoshiaki's memory, and the single sleeve for "Man in the Mirror", released in February 1988, contains a dedication to Yoshaiki. All profits from that single, the fourth consecutive number one single from Jackson's album, Bad, also went to the charity Camp Ronald McDonald for Good Times, of which Jackson had previously been one of the "Founding Fathers".

While on tour in November 1987, Jackson made a surprise visit to the Royal Children's Hospital in Melbourne, Australia, "armed with handfuls of autographed programs and T-shirts", a visit described by hospital staff as "an incredible tonic" for the many terminally ill young patients. Jackson's vocal coach Seth Riggs noted that Jackson would arrange to have sick children brought to his concerts, stating: "Every night the kids would come in on stretchers, so sick they could hardly hold their heads up. Michael would kneel down at the stretchers and put his face right down beside theirs so that he could have his picture taken with them, and then give them a copy to remember the moment". At a number of tour stops, Jackson would also visit with patients at a local children's hospital, and make a substantial donation to the facility. In May 1988, while touring in Rome, Jackson visited children suffering from cancer in the Bambino Gesù Hospital, also donating 100,000 pounds sterling to the hospital. Later that year, following another tour appearance at Wembley Stadium in England, Jackson presented Prince Charles and Princess Diana with a donation of $450,000 for The Prince's Trust, designated for the Great Ormond Street Children's Hospital, described as "a favorite charity of Jackson's". He also visited two wards of that hospital while on that trip.

In February 1989, a few weeks after a mass shooting at the Cleveland Elementary School in Stockton, California, resulted in the deaths of five children and the wounding of dozens more, Jackson visited the school and met with some of the children affected by the event.

=== 1990s and the Heal the World Foundation ===
In 1992, Jackson established the Heal the World Foundation as a charitable organization, inspired by his single of the same name. Jackson also continued to make charitable donations and participate in causes outside of the foundation. Following the 1992 Los Angeles riots, "Jackson donated $1.25 million to start a health counseling service for inner-city kids".

In 1993, following the death of HIV/AIDS spokesperson and friend Ryan White three years earlier in 1990, Jackson used his celebrity to bring global attention to the AIDS epidemic, notably through his friendship with Ryan and his charitable efforts with Elizabeth Taylor. Michael also pleaded with the Clinton administration at Bill Clinton's inaugural gala to give more money to HIV/AIDS charities and research, and performed "Gone Too Soon", a song dedicated to White, and "Heal the World" at the gala. In January 1994, Jackson "opened his Neverland Ranch in a Martin Luther King's Birthday celebration for 100 inner-city children who excelled in school". In 1995, after reading newspaper accounts of the death of a 22-month-old boy, Jackson was moved to donate an undisclosed amount to a fund for the family set up under the auspices of the St. Mary Medical Center in Long Beach, California. In February 1997, Jackson donated a HIStory Tour jacket and an autographed souvenir book "to raise funds for Hawaii's first Gay and Lesbian Cultural Festival".

In the 1990s, Jackson continued to visit children's hospitals and similar institutions, and sometimes individual sick or injured children. For example, in May 1992, Jackson visited a 7-year-old girl who had been mauled by Rottweilers two months before, having telephoned to promise this visit while she was still in the hospital. While touring in 1996, Jackson visited orphanages in Tokyo and Prague, the latter during his HIStory World Tour.

In 1995, Jackson composed a charity song, "Children's Holiday", recorded by the Japanese group J-Friends. Proceeds went to a charity to help victims of the Great Hanshin earthquake in Japan. The single was released in 1998. In 1999, J-Friends released another single for charity, "People Of The World", which Jackson executive-produced.

In June 1999, Jackson put together two charity concerts dubbed MJ & Friends. The first was held in Seoul, South Korea and the second in Munich, Germany. Several other performers took the stage in addition to Jackson and the concerts raised monies to benefit Nelson Mandela's Children Fund, and children's charities in Kosovo and elsewhere. Originally, two additional concerts were planned, but they had to be cancelled due to an injury Jackson sustained during the concert in Munich when, during his performance of "Earth Song", a section of the bridge he was standing on collapsed. He climbed out of the pit that the mechanism landed in and continued the performance, but had to be taken to the hospital when his performance ended and he left the stage.

==== Heal the World Foundation ====
The purpose of the Heal the World Foundation (HTWF) was to provide medicine to children and fight world hunger, homelessness, child exploitation and abuse. Jackson stated that he wanted "to improve the conditions for children throughout the world". The foundation also brought underprivileged children to Jackson's Neverland Ranch, located outside Santa Ynez, California, to go on theme park rides that Jackson had built on the property after he purchased it in 1988. It also sent millions of dollars around the globe to help children threatened by war, poverty, and disease. Through his foundation, Jackson airlifted 46 tons of supplies to Sarajevo, instituted drug and alcohol abuse education and donated millions of dollars to disadvantaged children, including the full payment of a Hungarian child's liver transplant.

Part of the proceeds of the Dangerous World Tour, which ran between June 1992 and November 1993 and grossed $100 million, went to Heal the World Foundation. The Dangerous World Tour began on June 27, 1992, and finished on November 11, 1993. Jackson performed to 3.5 million people in 69 concerts. All profits from the concerts went to the "Heal the World Foundation", raising millions of dollars in relief.

At the National Football League's Super Bowl XXVII, Jackson performed several songs, including his anthem "Heal the World", to help promote the organization with the assistance of a choir of 750 people and a flash card display involving 98,000 volunteers. Jackson donated his entire fees for the performance to the foundation, with the NFL also donating $100,000 and a 30-second TV spot to push for contributions. Following the Super Bowl, Jackson ran a full-page advertisement in the newspaper USA Today, providing a toll-free number. A coupon was provided that could be clipped and mailed in along with a contribution. Those donating $35 or more were given a "Heal the World" T-shirt. The environmental themed music video for the 1995 single "Earth Song" closed with a request for donations to Jackson's foundation.

==== Heal the Kids ====
In February 2001, Jackson launched Heal the Kids, an initiative of HTWF and part of the foundation's attempt to boost children's welfare. Jackson launched the charity initiative, stating, "Heal the Kids will help adults and parents realize it's in our power to change the world our children live in".

Jackson gave a speech at Oxford University about raising children, as part of the launch of his "Heal the Kids" initiative. In the speech, Jackson spoke rhetorically of his children, "What if they grow older and resent me, and how my choices impacted their youth?...Why weren't we given a normal childhood like all the other children? And at that moment I pray that my children will give me the benefit of the doubt. That they will say to themselves: Our daddy did the best he could, given the unique circumstances he faced. I hope that they will focus on the positive things, on the sacrifices I willingly made for them...". Journalist J. Randy Taraborrelli concluded that Jackson's performance during the speech was "absorbing" and well received.

== Charities and causes supported ==
Following is a non-exhaustive list of charities supported by Michael Jackson. Because Jackson's charitable donations were not always publicized, the full extent of his activity in the field cannot be known.

- AIDS Project Los Angeles
- American Cancer Society
- Atlanta Children's Foundation
- The Atlanta Project
- Bambino Gesù Hospital in Rome
- Big Brothers Big Sisters of America
- BMI Foundation
- Boys & Girls Clubs of America
- Chicago Public Library
- Childhelp USA
- Children's Defense Fund
- Cure4Lupus
- Elizabeth Taylor AIDS Foundation
- End Hunger Network
- Give For Life
- The Gorbachev Foundation
- Heal the World Foundation
- James Bulger centre for bullied children
- Juvenile Diabetes Research Foundation
- La Partita del Cuore (The Heart Match)
- Make-A-Wish Foundation
- Motown Museum Historical Foundation
- Mount Sinai New York Medical Center
- NAACP
- National Solidarity Fund
- Nelson Mandela Children's Fund
- Ronald McDonald House Charities and Camp Ronald McDonald for Good Times
- Sickle Cell Research Foundation
- St. Mary Medical Center in Long Beach
- Starlight Children's Foundation
- T. J. Martell Foundation for Leukemia and Cancer Research
- The Prince's Trust and the Great Ormond Street Children's Hospital
- United Negro College Fund
- UNESCO
- USA for Africa
- Volunteers of America
- YMCA – 28th Street/Crenshaw

== Recognition for philanthropic work ==
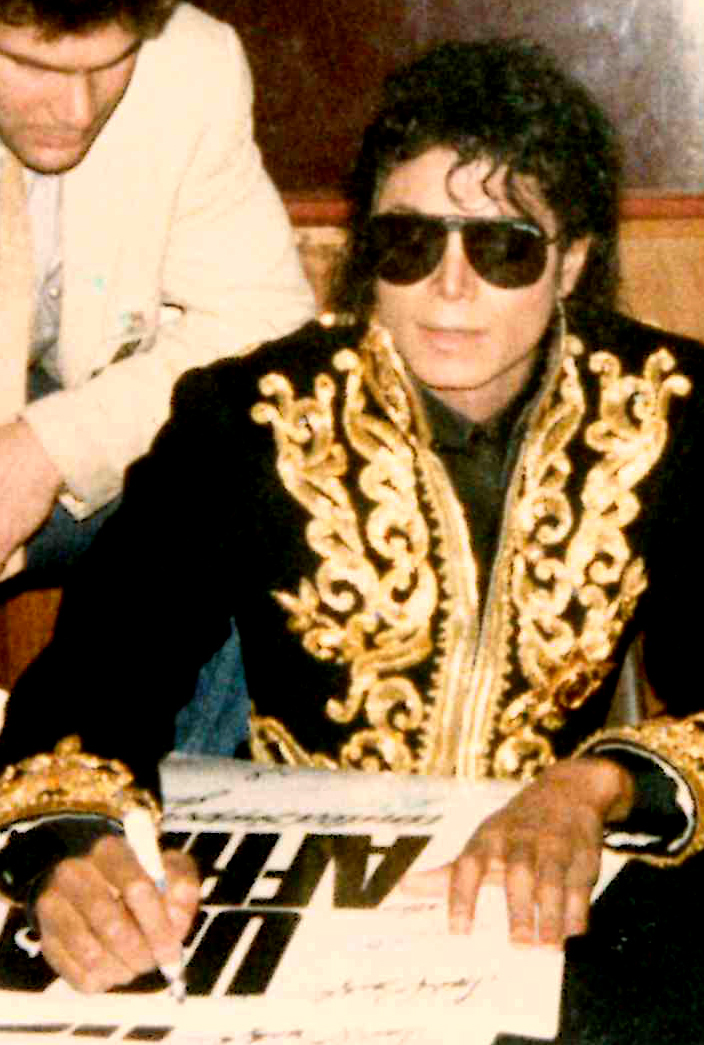
Michael Jackson signing 'We Are The World" posters in 1985

President Ronald Reagan and First Lady Nancy Reagan shortly before presenting Jackson with the Presidential Humanitarian Award at the White House on May 14, 1984

On May 14, 1984, President Ronald Reagan gave Jackson a Presidential Humanitarian Award recognizing his support of alcohol and drug abuse charities, and of anti-drunk driving efforts. Prior to collecting the award, President Reagan sent Jackson a telegram, which read:

Your deep faith in God and adherence to traditional values are an inspiration to all of us. You've gained quite a number of fans along the road since "I Want You Back" and Nancy and I are among them. Keep up the good work, Michael. We're very happy for you.

The presentation took place on May 14, 1984, at the White House. Upon reaching the podium, Reagan remarked, "I hope you'll forgive me, but we have quite a few young folks in the White House who all wanted me to give you the same message. They said to tell Michael, "Please give some TLC to the PYTs." A reference to Jackson's Grammy Award-nominated song, "P.Y.T. (Pretty Young Thing)". Reagan also stated that Jackson "is proof of what a person can accomplish through a lifestyle free of alcohol or drug abuse. People young and old respect that. And if Americans follow his example, then we can face up to the problem of drinking and driving, and we can, in Michael's words, beat it". On May 1, 1992, President George H. W. Bush also presented Jackson with an award acknowledging him as "a point of light ambassador".

In 2000, Guinness World Records recognized him for supporting 39 charities, more than any other entertainer. Jackson was twice nominated for the Nobel Peace Prize for his humanitarian work, first in 1998, and again in 2003. After Jackson's death in 2009, many charitable donations were made in honor of his philanthropic work. Several speakers at the Michael Jackson memorial service referenced Jackson's philanthropic work, with Kobe Bryant of the Los Angeles Lakers calling Jackson "a true humanitarian, who gave as much off stage as he did onstage." Over 15,000 people petitioned for another Nobel Peace Prize nomination for Jackson, but the timing of his death made Jackson ineligible for consideration, although Jackson's song, "Man in the Mirror", was performed as the finale of the 2009 Nobel Peace Prize Concert.

=== Sheila Jackson Lee Resolution ===
Shortly after Jackson's death in 2009, Representative Sheila Jackson Lee authored a congressional resolution commemorating Jackson, specifically identifying 35 examples of philanthropic work on his part, partially reproduced below.

Sheila Jackson Lee resolution text

Whereas, on January 10, 1984, Michael Jackson visited the unit for burn victims at Brotman-Memorial Hospital in Los Angeles, and demonstrated his concern with people suffering from grievous injuries;

Whereas, on April 9, 1984, David Smithee, a 14-year-old boy suffering from cystic fibroses was invited to Michael's home, in response to a dying request to meet Michael. David passed away 7 weeks later;

Whereas, on April 14, 1984, Michael Jackson was single handedly responsible for equipping a 19-bed-unit at Mount Sinai New York Medical Center. This center is now a critical part of the T.J. Martell Foundation for leukemia and cancer research;

Whereas, on July 5, 1984, during the Jackson's press conference at Tavern On The Green, Michael announced that his portion of the earnings from the Victory Tour would be donated to three charitable organizations: The United Negro College Fund, Camp Good Times, and the T.J. Martell Foundation;

Whereas, on July 14, 1984, after the first concert of the Victory Tour, Michael met 8 terminally ill children backstage;

Whereas, on December 13, 1984, Michael visited the Brotman Memorial Hospital, where he had been treated when he was burned during the producing of a Pepsi commercial. He subsequently donated all the money he received from Pepsi, $1.5 million, to the Michael Jackson Burn Center for Children;

Whereas, on January 28, 1985 Michael and 44 other artists met to record "We Are The World", written by Michael and Lionel Richie, a project devoted to fighting global hunger. The proceeds of this record were donated to the starving people in Africa;

Whereas in 1986, Michael set up the "Michael Jackson UNCF Endowed Scholarship Fund". This $1.5 million fund is aimed toward assisting students majoring in performance art and communications, with money given each year to students attending a UNCF member college or university;

Whereas, on February 28, 1986, after having had a heart-transplant, 14-year-old Donna Ashlock from California received a call from Michael Jackson. He had heard that she was a fan. Michael invited Donna to his home following her recovery;

Whereas, on September 13, 1987, Michael supported a campaign against racism. He made every effort to publicly support NAACP, in the fight against discrimination of African-American artists;

Whereas in October 1987, at the end of his "Bad Tour", Michael donated personal items to UNESCO for a charitable auction. The proceeds of his donation were allocated for the education of children in developing countries;

Whereas, on February 1, 1988 The Song "Man In the Mirror" entered the charts. The proceeds from the sales of this record went directly and exclusively to Camp Ronald McDonald for Good Times, a camp for children who suffer from Cancer;

Whereas, on March 1, 1988, at a press conference held by his sponsor Pepsi, Michael presented a $600,000 check to the United Negro College Fund;

Whereas on April 1988, Michael Jackson ensured that free tickets to three concerts in Atlanta, Georgia, were specifically set aside for the Make a Wish Foundation;

Whereas, on May 22, 1988, Michael visited cancer-stricken children in the Bambini-Gesu Children's Hospital in Rome. He signed autographs and gave away sweets and records to the young patients. He also announced his monetary donation of 100,000 pounds to the hospital;

Whereas, on July 16, 1988, Michael met the Prince of Wales and his wife Diana, where he donated 150,000 pounds for the Prince's Trust, and a check of 100,000 pounds for the children's hospital at Great Ormond Street;

Whereas, on July 20, 1988, Michael visited terminally ill children at Great Ormond Street Hospital. At a unit for less critical patients he stayed longer to engage in story telling time with the children;

Whereas, on August 29, 1988, at his 30th birthday Michael performed a concert in Leeds, England, for the English charity organization "Give For Life", an organization designed as an immunization charity for children. Michael presented a check for 65,000 pounds;

Whereas on January 1989, the proceeds of one of Michael's shows in Los Angeles were donated to Childhelp USA, the biggest charity organization against child abuse. In appreciation of the contributions of Michael, Childhelp of Southern California founded the "Michael Jackson International Institute for Research On Child Abuse";

Whereas, on January 10, 1989, upon the winding down of his "Bad Tour", Michael Jackson donated tickets for each concert to underprivileged children, and made contributions to hospitals, orphanages and charity organizations throughout each stop on his tour;

Whereas, on February 7, 1989, Michael visited the Cleveland Elementary School in Stockton, California, a site of playground violence where 5 children had been tragically killed and 39 had been wounded;

Whereas, on March 5, 1989, Michael invited 200 underprivileged children of the St. Vincent Institute for Handicapped Children and of the organization Big Brothers and Big Sisters to the Circus Vargas in Santa Barbara. Following the event, the children were invited to his ranch to visit his private Zoo at Neverland Ranch;

Whereas in December 1991, Michael's office MJJ Productions donated more than 200 turkey dinners to needy families in Los Angeles;

Whereas in February 1992, within 11 days Michael covered 30,000 miles in Africa, to visit hospitals, orphanages, schools, churches, and institutions for mentally handicapped children;

Whereas, on February 3, 1992, at a press conference at the New York Radio City Music Hall, Michael announced that he is planning a new world tour, to raise funds for his new "Heal The World" Foundation. This Foundation was designed to support the fight against AIDS, Juvenile Diabetes, the Ronald McDonald Camp, and the Make A Wish Foundation;

Whereas, on May 6, 1992, Michael defrayed the funeral expenses for Ramon Sanchez, who was killed during the Los Angeles riots;

Whereas, on June 26, 1992, Michael presented the Mayor of Munich, Mr. Kronawitter, with a 40,000 DM check for the needy people of the city;

Whereas on July 1992, Michael donated 821,477,296 Lire to La Partita del Cuore (The Heart Match) in Rome and donated 120,000 DM to children's charities in Estonia and Latvia;

Whereas, on July 25, 1992, at his concert in Dublin, Ireland, Michael announced that he will give 400,000 pounds of the tour earnings to various charities;

Whereas in June 1993, Michael announced a donation of $1.25 million for children suffering as a result of the riots in Los Angeles;

Whereas on October 1993, Michael Jackson donated $100,000 to the Children's Defense Fund, the Children's Diabetes Foundation, the Atlanta Project, and the Boys and Girl Clubs of Newark, New Jersey;

Whereas on December 1993, in conjunction with the Gorbachev Foundation, Michael Jackson airlifted 60,000 doses of children's vaccines to Tbilisi, Georgia;

Whereas in 1994, Michael donated $500,000 to Elizabeth Taylor's AIDS Foundation;

Whereas, on October 1, 1996, Michael donated the proceeds of his Tunisia concert to "The National Solidarity Fund", a charity dedicated to fighting poverty;

Whereas, on December 9, 1996, during the "History Tour" visit in Manila, Michael visited a Children's Hospital, where he announced that a portion of his concert earnings will be donated to the renovation of the Hospital;

Whereas the Millennium Issue of the "Guinness Book Of Records" named Michael as "the Pop Star who supports the most charity organizations"; [and]

Whereas in 2004, The African Ambassadors' Spouses Association, honored Michael Jackson for his worldwide humanitarian efforts, due to his fiscal contribution of more than $50 million to various charities, including many organizations that feed the hungry in Africa; ...

Resolved, That the House of Representatives—

(1) recognizes Michael Jackson as a global humanitarian and a noted leader in the fight against worldwide hunger and medical crises; and

(2) celebrates Michael Jackson as an accomplished contributor to the worlds of arts and entertainment, scientific advances in the treatment of HIV/AIDS, and global food security.

=== Awards and honors ===
Jackson has won numerous awards for his philanthropic and humanitarian endeavors, including honors from two Presidents of the United States. Following is a non-exhaustive list of the recognitions he has received:

Year	Organization	Award	Comments
1972	United States Congress	Special Commendation for Positive Role Models	Awarded to The Jackson 5, including Michael.
1974	Organization of African Unity	Plaque	Awarded to The Jackson Five, for strengthening Afro-Americans through their "contribution to the understanding of Africa".
1984	NAACP Image Awards	H. Claude Hodson Medal of Freedom	
1984	President Ronald Reagan	Presidential Humanitarian Award	For humanitarian endeavors
1988	City of Chicago	Key to the City	After performing three sold-out concerts at the Metropolitan Chicago's Rosemont Horizon in April 1988, Jackson received the Key to the City from Mayor Eugene Sawyer, who cited the entertainer for his onstage performance and humanitarian philanthropy. Jackson shared his honor backstage with internationally renowned singer/dancer/actress Lola Falana, who was also battling multiple sclerosis.
1988	NAACP Image Awards	Leonard Carter Humanitarian Award	For humanitarian endeavors.
1988	United Negro College Fund	Frederick Patterson Award	Presented to Jackson by Liza Minnelli, Yoko Ono, Quincy Jones, and Steven Spielberg.
1989	National Urban Coalition Awards	Humanitarian Award	For his humanitarian endeavors.
1990	Boy Scouts of America	Good Scout Humanitarian Award	Humanitarian award.
1990	Capital Children's Museum	Humanitarian Award	Humanitarian award.
1991	Ebony	One of the 100 most important black people of the 20th century	One of two awards to Jackson for "Black Achievement", noting his humanitarian efforts.
1992	Africa Awards	The West African Nations Medal of Honor	During a visit to Gabon, Jackson became the first entertainer to receive this honor.
1992	Association of Black Owned Broadcasters	Lifetime Achievement Award	Award given for Jackson's achievements in culture and philanthropy; presented by Rev. Jesse Jackson and NABOB Chairman Pierre Sutton at the organization's eighth annual Communications Awards Dinner, in Washington D.C.
1992	President George H. W. Bush	Point of Light Ambassador	Jackson received the award in recognition for his efforts in inviting disadvantaged children to his Neverland Ranch. Jackson was the only entertainer to receive the award.
1994	Crenshaw Community Youth & Arts Foundation	Humanitarian Award	Humanitarian award.
1995	National Association of Recording Merchandisers	The Harry Chapin Memorial Humanitarian Award	NARM is a United States not-for-profit trade association that serves music retailing businesses in lobbying and trade promotion.
1995	VH1 Awards	International Humanitarian Award	Jackson was the inaugural recipient of the VH1 International Honors Award, designed to recognize artists' efforts to help the world.
1999	Bollywood Movie Awards	Outstanding Humanitarian Award	One of two Bollywood Awards for Jackson's humanitarian endeavors.
2000	G&P Foundation Angel Ball	Angel of Hope Award	For outstanding contribution to the fight against Cancer
2002	Celebrate the Magic Foundation	Magic Life Award	Humanitarian award,.
2002	World Awards	World Arts Award 2002	
2003	Oneness Awards	Power of Oneness Award	For his contributions to racial harmony.
2004	African Ambassadors’ Spouses Association	Golden Elephant Award	For his continuing humanitarian efforts.
2009	Pocono Film Festival	Humanitarian Award	Awarded after his death, it was accepted by his father Joseph Jackson.
2009	World Awards	Save the World Award	Received posthumously for his many humanitarian contributions.
2010	Children Uniting Nations	Angel Award	Given at the Children Uniting Nations Oscar Celebration for Jackson's work to help disadvantaged youngsters around the world. Jackson's sister, Rebbie Jackson, accepting the award on Jackson's behalf, said "I was very pleased and happy to be a part of this -- Michael was very passionate about children and supporting their causes. Boy, he would have loved this".

== See also ==
- List of Michael Jackson records and achievements
- List of awards and nominations received by Michael Jackson
- Michael Forever – The Tribute Concert

== Print sources ==
- Campbell, Lisa (1993). Michael Jackson: The King of Pop. Branden. ISBN 0-8283-1957-X.
- George, Nelson (2004). Michael Jackson: The Ultimate Collection booklet. Sony BMG.
- Guinness World Records (2001). Guinness World Records 2002. Guinness. ISBN 0553583786.
- Guinness World Records (2005). Guinness World Records 2006. Guinness. ISBN 1-904994-02-4.
- Thriller 25: The Book (2008). Thriller 25: The Book. ML Publishing Group. ISBN 978-0-9768891-9-9.
- Taraborrelli, J. Randy (2004). The Magic and the Madness. Terra Alta, WV: Headline. ISBN 0-330-42005-4.
- Taraborrelli, J. Randy (2009). Michael Jackson: The Magic, The Madness, The Whole Story, 1958–2009. Grand Central Publishing, 2009. ISBN 978-0-446-56474-8.
- Image Awards (NAACP) (1979)
