= List of concert tours by the Jackson 5 =

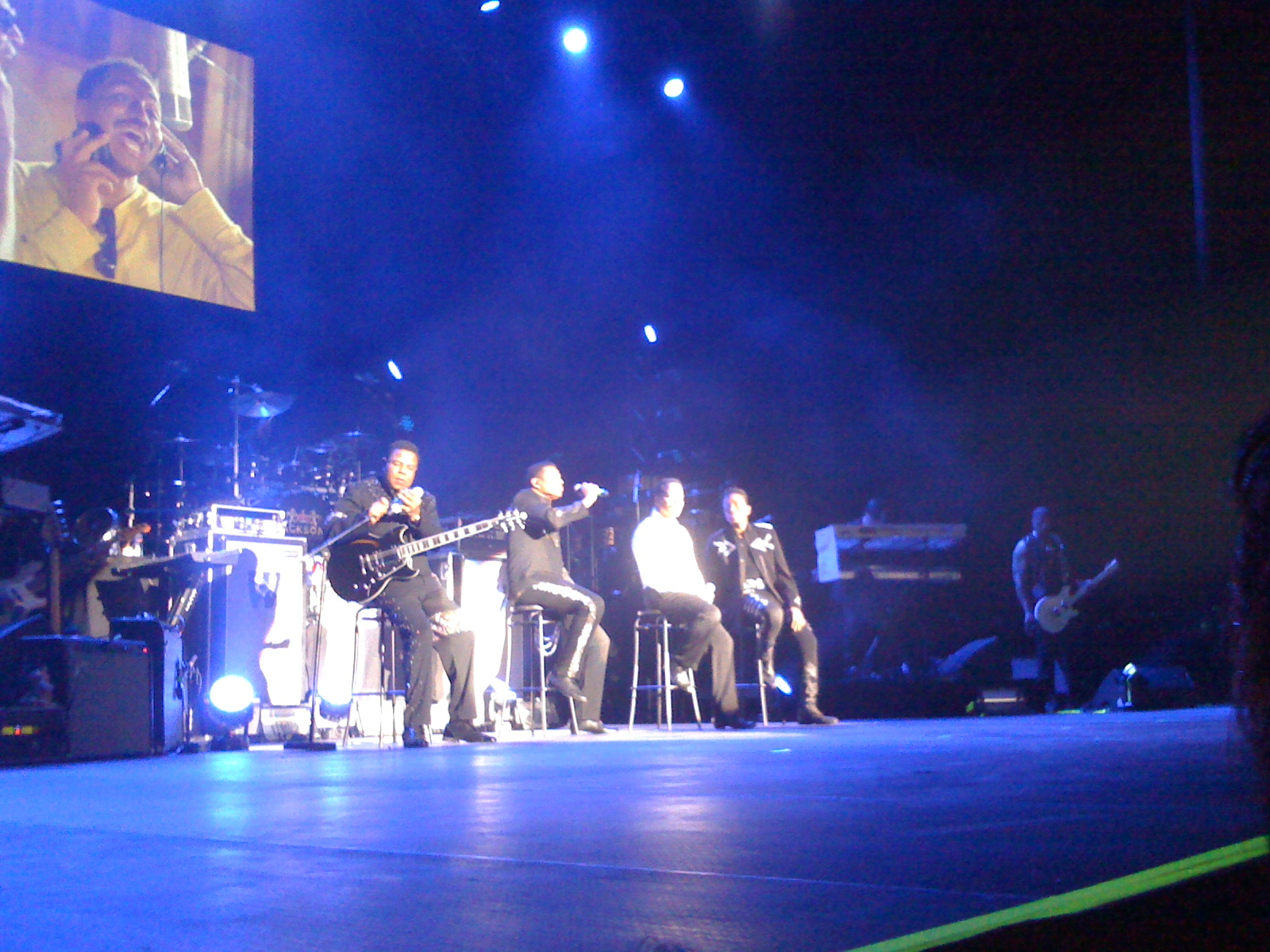
The Jacksons performing during the Unity Tour (2013)

The Jackson 5 are an American music group, formed in 1964 by the Jackson family brothers Jackie, Tito, Jermaine, Marlon, and Michael. The brothers' first invitation to perform was in Glen Park in 1965, with other early concerts at Theodore Roosevelt College and Career Academy, Gilroy Stadium, Gary's Memorial Auditorium, Regal Theater, Chicago and Apollo Theater, Harlem in 1967.

The quintet's first concert tour was in the United States, where they performed in cities such as Boston, Cincinnati and New York City throughout the final quarter of 1970. The brothers remained in their homeland for two more US tours, before successfully expanding to Europe in 1972 and the rest of world the following year.

With Motown owning the name 'Jackson 5' the move to Epic Records renames group to The Jacksons, while Jermaine who had married Hazel Gordy (Berry Gordy's daughter) remains and the Jacksons embarked on another tour of Europe, where they performed in front of Queen Elizabeth II. After their interim concert series in 1978, the siblings proceeded with the Destiny Tour, a promotional platform for their similarly named album. Their 1981 36-city circulation of the United States—the Triumph Tour—came next. The Jacksons' final tour together was in 1984, following the release of two albums: the band's Victory and Michael Jackson's Thriller. The Victory Tour spanned 55 performances in the United States and Canada and grossed over $75 million.

== Tours ==
=== The Jackson 5 ===
Year	Title	Duration	Number of performances
1970	The Jackson 5 First National Tour	May 2 – December 30, 1970 (United States)	14
The Jackson 5 embarked on their first ever tour on May 2, 1970. The brothers performed in US cities such as Daly City, Boston, Cincinnati and New York City, and broke venue attendance records along the way. One concert scheduled for Buffalo, New York had to be cancelled due to death threats being made on Michael Jackson's life. 9,000 fans were refunded as a result.
1971	The Jackson 5 Second National Tour	January 2 – October 15, 1971 (United States)	46
The five brothers' second US tour featured 40 performances in US cities such as Philadelphia, New York City, and Milwaukee. The Commodores opened for the quintet. It was attended by over 750,000 and grossed a total of 2.5 million dollars.
1971–1972	The Jackson 5 US Tour	December 27, 1971 – October 27, 1972 (United States)	51+
The brothers (now including Randy) visits venues in more than 51 cities during their third tour of the United States. Visiting Houston, Cleveland, Chicago, and New York City
1972	The Jackson 5 European Tour	November 2 – 12, 1972 (Europe)	8
The brothers' 10-day tour of Europe had them break attendance records previously held by the Beatles. During the tour, the band performed for Queen Elizabeth The Queen Mother.
1973–1975	The Jackson 5 World Tour	March 2, 1973 – December 1975 (Worldwide)	over 380 concerts over a 3-year period
The quintet's first world tour was undertaken in three years, during which the brothers toured North and South America, United Kingdom, Asia, Oceania Africa and the West Indies. Along with starting their Las Vegas Revue with the Jackson sisters.
1976	The Jackson 5 Final Tour	February 13 – 19, 1976 (Philippines)	6
The last group tour as the Jackson 5, was held in Manila, Philippines, in February 1976, less than a month after their contract expires and the Motown Jackson 5 officially call themselves the Jacksons. It included six concerts.

=== The Jacksons (with Michael) ===
Year	Title	Duration	Number of performances
1977	The Jacksons Tour	May 19 – 24, 1977 (Europe and Venezuela)	Exact number unknown
The Jacksons performed in France, Germany, the Netherlands and the United Kingdom during their tour of Europe. In the latter country, the brothers sang at a Royal Command Performance for Queen Elizabeth II. On February 25, they travel to Venezuela and appear on television, where they announce a unique concert in the country. The following day, Saturday, February 26, the concert is celebrated in the Poliedro de Caracas.
1978	Goin' Places Tour	January 22 – May 13, 1978 (United States and Europe)	5
The Jacksons' interim tour brought the siblings to fans in the United States and Europe.
1979–1980	Destiny World Tour	January 22, 1979 – January 13, 1980 (Worldwide)	146
The Destiny World Tour accompanied the Jacksons' 1978 Destiny album. The brothers toured 80 US cities and played several dates in France, the Netherlands, Switzerland, South Africa and the United Kingdom. Some of the concerts from the tour had to be cancelled because Michael Jackson became sick.
1981	Triumph Tour	July 8 – September 26, 1981 (United States and Canada)	45
Hailed as one of the greatest live shows of the 1980s by Rolling Stone magazine, the Triumph Tour grossed $5.5 million and became one of the Jacksons' most successful tours. The brothers performed in 37 US cities, including Los Angeles, California, where the band concluded their tour with four sold-out shows.
1984	Victory Tour	July 6 – December 9, 1984 (United States and Canada)	55
The Victory Tour began shortly after the release of the Jacksons' Victory and Michael Jackson's successful Thriller album. The five-month tour was of the United States and Canada, and served as Michael's last as lead singer of the Jacksons. The 55-performance concert series was attended by more than 2 million people, and grossed in excess of $75 million—a record at the time.

=== The Jacksons (after Michael's death) ===
Year	Title	Duration	Number of performances
2012–2013	Unity Tour	June 20, 2012 – July 27, 2013 (Worldwide)	70
The Unity Tour was the Jacksons' first concert tour of the United States in almost three decades. The tour also marked the first time the brothers have toured as the Jacksons without brother Michael, who died in June 2009. In addition, this was the first concert tour without Randy Jackson, as he retired a couple of years earlier. The tour began on June 20, 2012, and ended on July 27, 2013. The lineup consisted of the four eldest Jackson brothers: Jackie, Tito, Jermaine, and Marlon.
2017	A Celebration of 50 Years	11 June – 5 October 2017 (Mostly UK)	13
This was a small tour of the UK, with a date in the Netherlands and Canada, commemorating the group's 50th anniversary. The tour included events such as CarFest, Love Supreme Jazz Festival, and Glastonbury Festival 2017.
2018	The Jacksons (2018)	24 February – 29 December 2018 (Mostly US)	16
This was a small tour, mostly of the US.
2019	The Jacksons World Tour	10 January – 7 September 2019 (Worldwide)	33
This was a tour in a variety of countries. Included Hampton Court Palace Festival and Sint Maarten Heineken Regatta.

== Countries covered ==
Countries covered by the Jackson 5 concert tours

The HIStory World Tour covered 35 countries, with the Unity Tour covering 19 countries. Between all the group and solo tours, the brothers have played concerts in more than 50 countries on 6 continents.

Some of the countries include United States, United Kingdom, Canada, Brazil, Australia, India, and Russia.

== See more ==
- List of concert tours by Michael Jackson
