= MJ & Friends =

1999 concerts by Michael Jackson

- Benefit concert by Michael Jackson
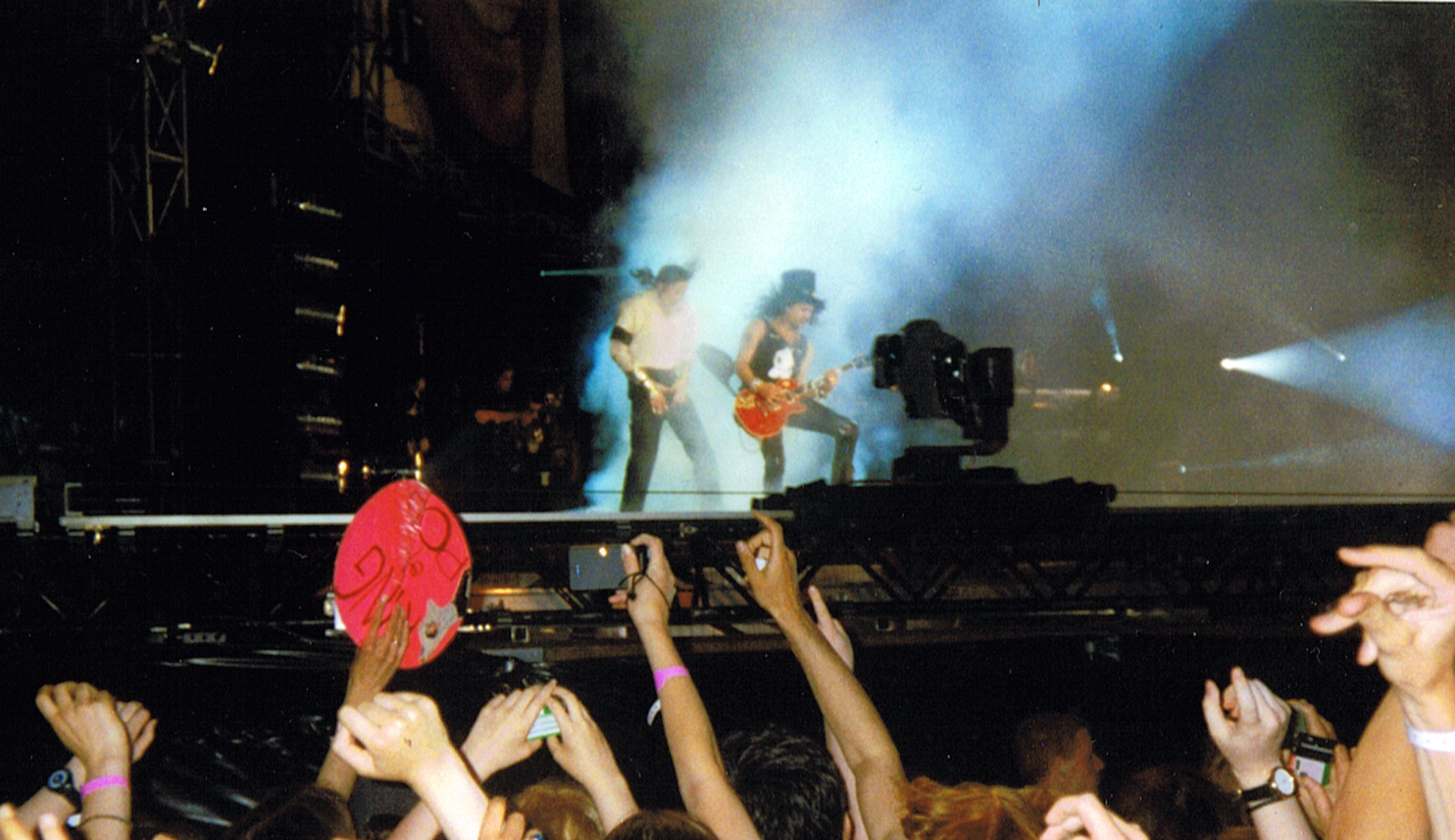
- Jackson performing in Munich, June 1999
- Location: Asia; Europe
- Start date: June 25, 1999
- End date: June 27, 1999
- No. of shows: 2

Michael Jackson concert chronology
- HIStory World Tour (1996–1997); MJ & Friends (1999); Michael Jackson: 30th Anniversary Celebration (2001)

Michael Jackson & Friends – The Adventure of Humanity (MJ & Friends) were two benefit concerts held by American singer and songwriter Michael Jackson in June 1999. Other performers included Slash of Guns N' Roses.

The concerts aimed to raise funds for children in Kosovo, Africa and elsewhere. They took place at Seoul Olympic Stadium in Seoul, South Korea, on June 25 and at the Olympiastadion in Munich, Germany, on June 27.

== Background ==
=== Announcement and humanitarian purpose ===
Jackson announced the concerts with South African President Nelson Mandela at Mandela's Cape Town residence on March 23, 1999. Sony Europe's announcement identified the Nelson Mandela Children's Fund, the Red Cross and UNESCO as the intended recipients of ticket and telethon proceeds.

In his announcement speech, Jackson described the undertaking as an "Adventure for Humanity" before the millennium and credited Mandela as an inspiration. He identified "What More Can I Give" as a planned song and the theme of the shows.

=== Munich bridge accident ===
At the Munich concert, while performing "Earth Song", the middle section of the bridge collapsed after ascending into the air.

Jackson climbed out of the pit that the mechanism landed in and continued the song without missing a beat. The guitarist Slash was front and center on the main stage at the time; he also continued his performance while dashing upstage to safety.

Jackson finished the concert but was taken to the Rechts der Isar Hospital afterwards. He suffered a damaged spine, a sprained ankle, shock nerves and slight burns on his arms. None of the fans, crew or backup performers were injured. The crash was confirmed to be a mechanical failure from the crane, according to Kenny Ortega, director of the shows.

The same stunt had been performed without incident at the first concert in Seoul.

=== Millennium concerts ===
On December 31, 1999, and January 1, 2000, Jackson was scheduled to perform at Aloha Stadium in Honolulu, Hawaii, United States, and at Stadium Australia in Sydney, Australia. These plans were later cancelled.

== Continuation through Adventure of Humanity ==
=== From the concerts to a continuing project ===
The humanitarian initiative associated with the 1999 MJ & Friends concerts is described by Adventure of Humanity as the foundation of its continuing mission to carry forward the humanitarian vision of Michael Jackson and Nelson Mandela. The organization promotes peace, human dignity, equality, environmental sustainability and international cooperation through charitable initiatives, educational activities, cultural events and partnerships.

=== Richard Nilsson and the legacy families ===
In 2014, following the deaths of Jackson and Mandela, Richard Nilsson took on responsibility for continuing the Adventure of Humanity project. Katherine and Joe Jackson and Nelson Mandela's grandson Mandla Mandela endorsed Nilsson to carry the project forward on behalf of the Jackson and Mandela families. Nilsson serves as president of Adventure of Humanity.

To broaden the foundation of Adventure of Humanity, Nilsson expanded the project's circle of supporters to include the 14th Dalai Lama and Tara Gandhi Bhattacharjee, Mahatma Gandhi’s granddaughter, alongside the Jackson and Mandela families. Together, they form what the organization refers to as its four "Legacy Families", united by six guiding principles: love, peace, unity, equality, friendship, and happiness for all life. Members of the Jackson family, including Jermaine Jackson, La Toya Jackson and Joe Jackson, have participated in activities associated with Adventure of Humanity and expressed support for its humanitarian objectives.

=== Humanitarian and educational initiatives ===
Beyond its musical and fundraising events, Adventure of Humanity supports initiatives focused on education, children's rights, peacebuilding, environmental sustainability and cultural understanding. Its educational activities include a collaboration with India's DEVI Sansthan on ALfA (Accelerating Learning for All), an educational program designed to improve literacy and numeracy and expand access to learning, particularly among disadvantaged children and adults.

Through its SMILE initiative, the organization has described activities involving children from different countries, including Nepal and Japan, aimed at promoting children's rights, equality, friendship and intercultural understanding. The initiative seeks to encourage young people to participate in building a more peaceful and inclusive world.

Adventure of Humanity's Nation to Nation initiative focuses on encouraging dialogue and cooperation between nations, communities and international representatives, with the stated objective of promoting peaceful conflict resolution and mutual understanding. The organization has also highlighted the importance of Indigenous knowledge, cultural preservation and cooperation with Indigenous leaders in its humanitarian activities.

=== Humanitarian events and activities (2011–2026) ===
Beginning in 2011, Richard Nilsson hosted a series of Jackson family celebrations at Villa Oxygène in Vallauris, near Cannes, France. Villa Oxygène, owned by Nilsson, who also serves as president of Adventure of Humanity, acted as a host venue and sponsor of events held at the property. Joe Jackson attended gatherings in 2011, 2012 and subsequent years. These celebrations preceded the World Peace Night events associated with Adventure of Humanity, bringing together international musicians, members of the Jackson and Mandela families, and humanitarian supporters during the Cannes Film Festival. Participants across different years included Mandla Mandela, Jermaine Jackson, La Toya Jackson, Wes Madiko, Kool & the Gang, Leee John of Imagination, Opus, Leroy Gomez of Santa Esmeralda, Nicole Slack Jones and musicians associated with the Gipsy Kings. Wes Madiko performed at Villa Oxygène in 2013, while Jermaine Jackson participated in 2017 and La Toya Jackson in 2018.

Adventure of Humanity also supported humanitarian activities in Brazil, including Zico's Jogo das Estrelas charity football event at Maracanã Stadium in Rio de Janeiro, with Jermaine Jackson participating in 2017 and Iggy Azalea performing in 2018. Related initiatives included charitable support for organizations assisting children undergoing cancer treatment, including Ronald McDonald organizations in Brazil. During his visit in 2017, Jermaine Jackson also visited Instituto Ronald McDonald and distributed toys to children.

Between 2023 and 2026, Richard Nilsson, owner of Villa Oxygène and president of Adventure of Humanity, was involved in hosting, sponsoring and co-producing fundraising galas benefiting the Nelson Mandela Children's Fund. The 2023, 2024 and 2026 events were held at Villa Oxygène near Cannes, while the 2025 gala took place at Palais Bulles, formerly owned by fashion designer Pierre Cardin. Notable participants across the events included Jerry Inzerillo, Karolina Bielawska, Magic Johnson, Nicoletta Mantovani, widow of Luciano Pavarotti, the Ugandan dance group Ghetto Kids, and Debbie Sledge of Sister Sledge.

On May 20, 2026, Adventure of Humanity hosted Friends of MJ Night at Villa Oxygène during the Cannes Film Festival, with the property serving as the event's venue and sponsor. Dedicated to Michael Jackson's artistic and humanitarian legacy, the gathering brought together musicians, cultural representatives and supporters of international peace initiatives. The published musical program featured Debbie Sledge of Sister Sledge, Bev Bevan of Electric Light Orchestra and The Move, Maria Rubia of Fragma, soprano Lydie Pace, saxophonist Saxlover and DJ Kent Larsen. Michael Jackson's former manager Dieter Wiesner was also listed as a featured guest speaker. The event's program included Buddhist representatives Phurba Khen Rinpoche and Lama Tashi Norbu, as well as Indigenous spiritual representatives from the Americas, reflecting Adventure of Humanity's emphasis on cultural dialogue, peace and international cooperation.

== Set list ==
The following songs were performed during the both shows as the Michael's participation:

- "Don't Stop 'Til You Get Enough" (intro)
- "The Way You Make Me Feel" / "Scream" (sample) / "Beat It" (with Vincent Price's laugh from "Thriller") / "Black or White" (featuring Slash)
- "Billie Jean"
- "Dangerous" (contains elements from "Owner of a Lonely Heart" by Yes, Ennio Morricone's "The Good, the Bad and the Ugly Theme", "Smooth Criminal", Janet Jackson's "You Want This" and "Interlude: Let's Dance", Judy Garland's "Get Happy", Monty Norman's "James Bond Theme", and a guitar intro from Duran Duran's "A View to a Kill")
- "You Are Not Alone"
- "Earth Song"

== Tour dates ==
Date	City	Country	Venue
June 25, 1999	Seoul	South Korea	Seoul Olympic Stadium
June 27, 1999	Munich	Germany	Olympiastadion

== Cancelled dates ==
Date	City	Country	Venue
December 31, 1999	Sydney	Australia	Stadium Australia
January 1, 2000	Honolulu	United States	Aloha Stadium

== Personnel ==
=== Band members ===
- Musical director: Brad Buxer - Assistant musical director: Kevin Dorsey - Keyboards: Isaiah Sanders, Brad Buxer - Drums: Ricky Lawson - Guitar: David Williams, Slash - Bass: Sam Sims

=== Vocals ===
- Vocal director: Kevin Dorsey - Vocals: Kevin Dorsey, Dorian Holley, Romeo Johnson

== See also ==
- Philanthropy of Michael Jackson
