= Camp Ronald McDonald for Good Times =

Children's charity in California, United States

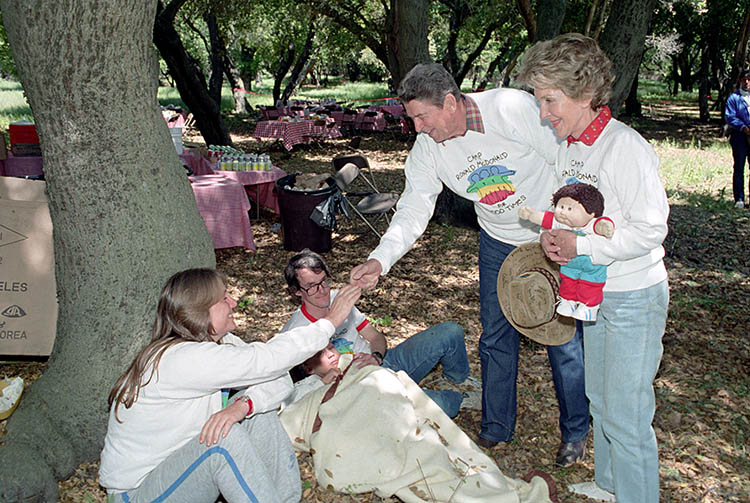
Ronald and Nancy Reagan visiting Camp Ronald McDonald for Good Times in 1987.

Camp Ronald McDonald for Good Times is a California-based charitable camp for children with cancer. The camp was established in 1982 by Pepper Edmiston, a Los Angeles woman whose oldest son, David, had leukemia. Edmiston couldn’t find a summer camp that would take a boy with cancer, so she started her own camp, one that would be free to young cancer patients from all over Southern California. The charity drew financial and organizational support from numerous celebrities, with Dustin Hoffman and Michael Jackson playing prominent roles in its early growth.

== History ==
The predecessor of the camp was a project announced in November 1977 to build a temporary home for up to 16 seriously ill children and their families to stay during treatment, sponsored by the Los Angeles Rams football team, the McDonald's Operators of Southern California, and Children's Hospital Los Angeles. The house was to be owned and operated by a nonprofit group formed for this purpose, Southern California Children's Cancer Services. Construction began in June 1979, and by March 1980, about two thirds of the necessary funds had been raised, with the Los Angeles Dodgers baseball team joining the effort. In 1983, Southern California Children's Cancer Services sponsored two five-night summer camp programs in Malibu for children with cancer, naming the program Camp Good Times.

In February 1984, a fundraising drive for Camp Good Times was supported by Michael Jackson, Richard Chamberlain, O. J. Simpson, David Soul, Neil Diamond, and Dustin Hoffman. Later in 1984, Camp Good Times was renamed Camp Ronald McDonald for Good Times. Dustin Hoffman had become interested in the charity due to the experience of his nephew, who visited the camp while fighting leukemia. Hoffman and Michael Jackson, another of the most significant contributors to the effort, were considered the "Founding Fathers" of the camp. Following the 1984 Victory Tour, headlined by The Jackson 5 and showcasing Jackson's solo material, Jackson donated his entire share of the proceeds, an estimated $3 to 5 million, to charity. Camp Ronald McDonald for Good Times was one of three major recipients of these donations, enabling the charity to build a year-round facility. All profits from Jackson's February 1988 single, "Man in the Mirror", the fourth consecutive number one single from Jackson's album, Bad, also went to this charity.

In 1985, Michael Landon filmed a two episodes of the NBC series Highway to Heaven at the camp, allowing some children at the camp to appear in the episodes. The episodes, "A Song for Jason: Episode 1" and "A Song for Jason: Episode 2", opened season 2 of the show, and aired on September 18 and 25, 1985. Between the two episodes, Brian Lane Green, Robin Riker, Giovanni Ribisi, Joshua John Miller, and Barry Williams guest starred either as children at the camp or their parents.

President Ronald Reagan visited the camp in 1987 to speak to children there, and made a personal donation to support it. He visited the camp again as a former president in 1989, welcoming four girls from the Soviet Union who were recovering from cancer. For the first camp session, executive director Pepper Edmiston, who had participating in founding the camp, sought out Calamigos Ranch in Malibu, which she had attended as a child. Her parents, Janet and Max Salter underwrote the week while Edmiston spent several months contacting parents of young patients, convincing them their children could thrive at camp.

Edmiston was removed from her position on the board of directors in 1993, claiming that her ousting resulted from her taking children to the inauguration of President Bill Clinton, which Edmiston asserted was opposed by McDonald's due to disagreement with Clinton's health care policies. Donors who supported Edmiston then sued the camp, alleging misuse of funds. The following year, Edminston started the competing Happy Trails Camp, also in California, to enable disabled children to work with and ride horses.

The camp later moved to a 60-acre site in the San Jacinto Mountains, and in 2006, Representative Mary Bono helped the camp to obtain $500,000 in federal funding to renovate camp buildings that had originally been constructed in the 1940s. In 2013, the camp had to be evacuated while a wildfire threatened the area.

== See also ==
- Ronald McDonald House Charities

== Sources ==
- Taraborrelli, J. Randy (2009). Michael Jackson: The Magic, The Madness, The Whole Story, 1958–2009. Grand Central Publishing, 2009. ISBN 978-0-446-56474-8.
