= Heal the World Foundation =

Charitable organization founded by entertainer Michael Jackson

- Formation: 1992; 34 years ago
- Founder: Michael Jackson
- Dissolved: 2002; 24 years ago
- Type: Charity
- Purpose: Ending poverty
- Location: United States
- Region served: 8 countries
- Official language: English
- Website: healtheworldforchildren.org

The original Heal the World Foundation was a charitable organization founded by singer Michael Jackson in 1992. The foundation's creation was inspired by his charitable eponymous single. Through his foundation, Jackson airlifted 46 tons of supplies to Sarajevo, instituted drug and alcohol abuse education and donated millions of dollars to disadvantaged children, including the full payment of a Hungarian child's liver transplant. Failure to file yearly accounting statements saw the charity lose its tax exempt status in 2002. A different organization, with no relationship to Michael Jackson's foundation, incorporated in the state of California under the same name and applied for new tax exempt status in 2008. The Jackson estate took legal action against this organisation for unfair competition and trademark infringement in 2009.

== Background ==
Prior to the creation of the Heal the World Foundation, Jackson had expressed great interest in humanitarianism, equality and world peace. Songs such as "Can You Feel It", "We Are the World" and "Man in the Mirror" convey this. Jackson also donated millions of dollars to charity, including his $5 million share from the Victory Tour.

In 1984, while filming a Pepsi Cola commercial, Jackson suffered second degree burns to his scalp after pyrotechnics accidentally set his hair on fire. PepsiCo settled a lawsuit out of court, and Jackson gave his $1.5 million settlement to the "Michael Jackson Burn Center" which was a piece of new technology to help people with severe burns.

Shortly afterward, Jackson was invited to the White House to receive an award presented by American President Ronald Reagan. The award was given for Jackson's support of charities that helped people overcome alcohol and drug abuse.

In 1985, Jackson co-wrote the charity single "We Are the World" with Lionel Richie, which was released worldwide to aid the poor in Africa and the US. He was one of 39 music celebrities who performed on the record. The single became one of the best-selling singles of all time, with nearly 20 million copies sold and millions of dollars donated to famine relief. It was also the first time Jackson was recognized for his humanitarian efforts.

== Mission ==
Jackson founded the charity in 1992, naming it after his hit song, "Heal the World". The purpose of the charity was to provide medicine to children and fight world hunger, homelessness, child exploitation and abuse. Jackson stated that he wanted "to improve the conditions for children throughout the world".

The foundation also brought underprivileged children to Jackson's Neverland Ranch, located outside Santa Ynez, California, to go on theme park rides that Jackson had built on the property after he purchased it in 1988.

== Fundraising ==
The Dangerous World Tour began on June 27, 1992, and finished on November 11, 1993. Jackson performed to 3.5 million people in 69 concerts. All profits from the concerts went to the "Heal the World Foundation", raising millions of dollars in relief. Through the foundation, Jackson airlifted 46 tons of supplies to Sarajevo and paid for a Hungarian child's liver transplant.

One of Jackson's most acclaimed performances came during the halftime show at the National Football League's Super Bowl XXVII. At the show, Jackson performed his anthem "Heal the World", to help promote the organization with the assistance of a choir of 750 people and a flash card display involving 98,000 volunteers. Jackson donated his entire fees to the foundation, with the NFL also donating $100,000 and a 30-second TV spot to push for contributions.

Following the Super Bowl, Jackson ran a full-page advertisement in the newspaper USA Today, providing a toll-free number. A coupon was provided that could be clipped and mailed in along with a contribution. Those donating $35 or more were given a "Heal the World" T-shirt.

The environmental themed music video for "Earth Song" closed with a request for donations to Jackson's foundation.

In 1997, Jackson earned money from photographs of his son, Prince Michael. The photographs were sold to OK! magazine and the National Enquirer, raising $3 million for the foundation.

== Heal the Kids ==
In February 2001, Jackson launched Heal the Kids, an initiative of HTWF and part of the foundation's attempt to boost children's welfare. Jackson launched the charity initiative, stating, "Heal the Kids will help adults and parents realize it's in our power to change the world our children live in".

Jackson gave a speech at Oxford University about raising children, as part of the launch of his "Heal the Kids" initiative. In the speech, Jackson spoke rhetorically of his children, "What if they grow older and resent me, and how my choices impacted their youth?...Why weren't we given a normal childhood like all the other children? And at that moment I pray that my children will give me the benefit of the doubt. That they will say to themselves: Our daddy did the best he could, given the unique circumstances he faced. I hope that they will focus on the positive things, on the sacrifices I willingly made for them...". Journalist J. Randy Taraborrelli concluded that Jackson's performance during the speech was "absorbing" and well received.

== Disbandment ==
In 2002, the Heal the World Foundation was suspended, after failing to file yearly accounting statements, required for tax-exempt organizations. Records showed that the foundation had net assets of $3,542 and reported $2,585 in expenses. The foundation did not have a director, president or other top manager besides Jackson, who was listed as chairman.

== Name confusion ==
A separate charity named Heal the World Foundation was set up in 2008. On August 11, 2009, CBS News reported that:

... representatives of the Jackson estate say the foundation is not linked, "The Michael Jackson estate has no connection whatsoever to the 'Heal the World Foundation' run by Melissa Johnson," said Terry Fahn, a spokesperson for John Branca, the special administrator of the Jackson estate.

On September 30, the Jackson Foundation started law action against the charity claiming that the "Defendants' acts of infringement and unfair competition have been committed with the intent to cause confusion, mistake and to deceive".

== See also ==
- Philanthropy of Michael Jackson
