= Nelson Mandela Children's Fund =

Charitable children's organisation founded by Nelson Mandela

- Founded: 1995; 31 years ago
- Founder: Nelson Mandela
- Purpose: Fundraising
- Headquarters: Saxonwold, Johannesburg
- Location: Johannesburg, South Africa
- Origins: South Africa
- CEO: Dr. Linda Ncube-Nkomo: CA(SA), PhD
- Key people: Management: Chief programmes officer: Stanley Maphosa; Chief financial officer: Sibusiso Zwane
- Employees: 34
- Website: https://www.nelsonmandelachildrensfund.com/
- Non-profit organisation registration number: 004-638-NPO

The Nelson Mandela Children's Fund (NMCF) is a charitable organisation founded by Nelson Mandela, based in South Africa. Its mission is to help individuals from birth to age 22.

== History ==
In 1995, Mandela stopped to talk to street children in Cape Town, and was inspired to found the organisation. He remarked:

"We were driving back to the Presidency in Cape Town one cold winter's evening, when I saw a group of street children and stopped to talk to them by the street "The children asked me why I love them. This astounded me, and I asked them why they asked this, and they said that because every time I get money from overseas, I share it with them."

Upon founding the organisation, he pledged to donate one-third of his salary to NMCF, and began fundraising.

The Nelson Mandela Children's Fund says it strives to change the way society treats its children and youth. This long-term vision captures the central role society plays in shaping children's lives and the mission is to give voice and dignity to the African child by building a rights-based movement.

== Programmes ==
=== Nelson Mandela Children's Hospital ===
The Nelson Mandela Children's Hospital is the Nelson Mandela Children's Fund flagship project. The Nelson Mandela Children's Hospital is a state-of-the-art, 200-bed specialist paediatric hospital that provides caring, child- and family-centred environment to treat and support critically ill children . The Nelson Mandela Children's Hospital Trust was established and tasked with raising R1 billion to bring the specialist paediatric hospital to life.

=== Child Safety and Protection ===
The Child Safety and Protection (CSP) intends to create a safer environment for children and youth in schools and communities. The main focus of the programme is reduction of corporal punishment in schools, decrease of sexual and gender based violence amongst women and girls and elimination of bullying within the schools. The programme currently is running in the following provinces Limpopo, Gauteng, Kwa-Zulu Natal, Eastern Cape and Western Cape.

=== Child Survival, Development & Thriving ===
With child mortality being labelled as a critical health issue as a result of malnutrition, lack of immunisation and access of mothers and children to medical services and health care, the first 1000 days of life became an important area for the Fund to focus on. The Fund's response is derived from an analysis of the scope of the problem, existing solutions and outstanding gaps.

The purpose of this intervention is to make certain that the care system respond to the needs of children under the age of 3 to better ensure their survival, development and thriving. The Fund's role is to act with extreme vigilance in closing the gaps through immunisation coverage, HIV-AIDS treatment or prevention, and tackling malnutrition.

The Fund's approach is about developing an activity based implementation plan considering the existing gaps at that level due to resource constraints. The plan is made up of three interrelated components to address the gaps in the top five worst affected districts of O.R. Tambo, Alfred Nzo and Joe Gqabi in the Eastern Cape, Zululand in Kwazulu Natal and John Taolo in the Northern Cape.

=== Youth Leadership Programme ===
The Youth Leadership Programme has been focused on advocacy and lobbying, with an emphasis on mobilising children and youth towards driving positive social change. Under the Youth Leadership Programme there are four projects that run. These projects are Efeng Bacha, Children's Parliament, Legacy Academy and YLP Alumni.

==== Efeng Bacha ====
The objectives of the NMCF Efeng Bacha Youth Programme are to provide opportunities, skills and mentoring to youths. The club encourages civic participation and upholds respect for diversity and a faith-based value system. Activities include seminars such as the Schools Safety Seminar, which formed part of 16 days of activism with a focus on violence against women in 2006. In March 2007, Efeng Bacha and the NMCF conducted a Teenage Pregnancy Seminar as the start of a research project with the ultimate aim of resolving the challenge of teenage pregnancy. The Efeng Bacha Youth Club is also involved with a Reading Initiative and with Youth Parliament.

Nelson Mandela Children's Parliament

The Nelson Mandela Children's Parliament (NMCP) programme was established to celebrate the values, principles and commitment of Mr Nelson Mandela to the children of South Africa, by giving children meaningful opportunities to participate, direct and influence decisions made on their behalf or in their best interest. Over the past 10 years, the hosting of the NMCP rotated across all provinces to create an opportunity for the children of South Africa to participate equally.

=== Sustainable Livelihoods ===
The Fund's Sustainable Livelihoods Project (SLP) was introduced in 2009 to address poverty experienced by families, especially in areas that have been identified by government as nodal points. These are areas that have a high rate of unemployment, low production because of various reasons and sometimes isolated in terms of securing basic services. The SLP aim to strengthen families and communities to cope with the situation of vulnerability while creating a better life and brighter future for the children.

SLP is designed to help communities to work out their way out of poverty by encouraging community members to form Self Help Groups (SHGs). The SHGs are engaged in savings mobilisation programmes and income generating activities, they also convene regular meetings to address challenges they face in their homes and communities.

=== Other fundraising initiatives ===
Other charitable events are arranged regularly, both locally and abroad. Gala dinners featuring auctions are used to raise funds in aid of the Nelson Mandela Children's Fund and the Nelson Mandela Foundation. One such event was the Mandela Day Gala Dinner and Auction. It was arranged by former US President Bill Clinton and held on 15 July 2009 at the Vanderbilt Hall in New York. Another successful gala dinner and auction was the Mandela Legacy Canvas Auction on 16 July 2011 in Cape Town. The canvas was successfully auctioned by South African auctioneer Rael Levitt for R2.5 million.

== Administration ==
Management

- Chief programmes officer: Stanley Maphosa
- Chief financial officer: Sibusiso Zwane
- Chief business engagement officer: Nomthi Mnisi
- Fundraising manager: Maeline Engelbrecht
- HR business partner: Mpumi Mabena

Board of trustees

- Chairperson: Judge Yvonne Mokgoro
- Judge Dion Basson
- Dr Warren Clewlow
- Shirley Mabusela
- Nana Magomola
- Mr Mpho Makwana
- Marumo Moerane
- Victor Nosi
- Charles Priebatsch
- Judge Kathleen Satchwel

== Project partners and associates ==
- The Goedgedacht Trust
- Witkoppen Health & Welfare Centre
- Far North Community Care Centre - Mutsindo Bakery
- FASFacts
- Ithuso Community Disability Project
- Khulisani Agriculture Academy
- Centre for Community Justice and Development (CCJD)
- Early Learning Resource Unit (ELRU)
- Ubuntu Pathways
- Kopano Ke Maatla
- The Valley Trust
- Afrika Tikkun Uthando Centre
- Far North Community Care and Development Centre 2
- Give A Child A Family
- Arise and Shine Centre
- Ebenezer Welfare Supporting and Caring Organisation
- KwaNgcolozi Child and Family Care
- Trigo Networks

== Fundraisers ==
Date	Name	Location	Funds raised
2010	Nelson Mandela Children's Fund UK Annual Gala Dinner	Thomas Lord Suite at Lord's, London	
2010	Stanley Sagov Benefit	Boston	

== Patrons ==
Contributors who have donated to the fund include:

- In 2008, Prime Minister Jens Stoltenberg of Norway pledged US$1 million.
- 2010, John Travolta, $10,000
- Cathy O'Dowd, mountaineer, helped raise R 250,000.
- Michael Flatley
- Michael Jackson via "Michael Jackson & Friends" benefit concerts
- South African Football Association, R6,000,000 (2016–2019)
- Europcar: R1 357 417 (2016–2021)

== Donations ==
- 2009: R91,870,000 (US$12,746,661)
- 2010: R64,346,000 (US$8,925,923)
- 2011: R64,184,000 (US$4,057,143)
- 2012: R30,720,000 (US$1,941,846)
- 2013: R23,405,000 (US$1,479,456)
- 2014: R29,580,000 (US$1,869,785)
- 2015: R37,534,000 (US$2,372,566)
- 2016: R26,613,000 (US$1,682,238)
- 2017: R34,715,000 (US$2,194,374)
- 2018: R15,369,000 (US$971,492)
- 2019: R22,150,000 (US$1,400,126)
- 2020: R24,985,000 (US$1,579,330)
- 2021: R13,868,000 (US$921,529)

== Offices ==
The Nelson Mandela Children's Fund currently has offices in Johannesburg, South Africa (Head Office) and in London, United Kingdom, which focuses on fundraising.

== See also ==
- Nonprofit organisation
- List of charitable foundations
