= List of artists influenced by Michael Jackson =

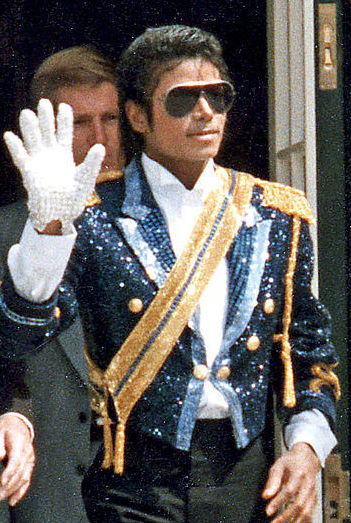
Michael Jackson in 1984

Michael Jackson (1958–2009), also known as the King of Pop, was an American pop, music, dance and fashion icon. His distinctive sound and style has influenced numerous artists of various music genres.

== Background and influences ==
Jackson's music took by storm in R&B, pop and soul. He had been influenced by the work of contemporary musicians such as James Brown, Jackie Wilson, Diana Ross, Fred Astaire, Sammy Davis Jr., Gene Kelly, David Ruffin, The Isley Brothers, the Bee Gees, and the West Side Story dancers. According to David Winters, who met and befriended Jackson while choreographing the 1971 Diana Ross TV special Diana!, (which was also Jackson's first solo debut outside of The Jackson 5), Jackson watched West Side Story almost every week and it was his favorite film. While Little Richard had a substantial influence on Jackson, James Brown was Jackson's greatest inspiration. In reference to Brown, Jackson declared: "Ever since I was a small child, no more than like six years old, my mother would wake me no matter what time it was, if I was sleeping, no matter what I was doing, to watch the television to see the master at work. And when I saw him move, I was mesmerized. I had never seen a performer perform like James Brown, and right then and there I knew that was exactly what I wanted to do for the rest of my life because of James Brown."

The young Michael Jackson owed his vocal technique in large part to Diana Ross. Not only a mother figure to him, she was often observed in rehearsal as an accomplished performer. He later expressed: "I got to know her well. She taught me so much. I used to just sit in the corner and watch the way she moved. She was art in motion. I studied the way she moved, the way she sang – just the way she was." He told her: "I want to be just like you, Diana." She said: "You just be yourself." But Jackson owed part of his enduring style—especially his use of the oooh interjection—to Ross. From a young age, Jackson often punctuated his verses with a sudden exclamation of oooh. Diana Ross had used this effect on many of the songs recorded with The Supremes.

== Influenced by Jackson ==
Over the years, hundreds of artists have specifically cited Michael Jackson as being their early inspiration, or reference him in their creative process, or as a specified influence:

Albania

- Alis
- Arilena Ara
- Bleona
- Claydee
- Elhaida Dani
- Jonida Maliqi
- Ronela Hajati
- Sin Boy
- Soni Malaj
- Young Zerka

Angola

- Anselmo Ralph
- Matias Damásio
- Yuri da Cunha

Argentina

- Dante Spinetta
- David Leiva
- Fátima Flórez
- Lali Espósito

Armenia

- André
- Asmik Shiroyan
- Parg
- Srbuk
- Stephanie Topalian

Australia

- Betty Who
- Bonnie Anderson
- Darren Hayes (Savage Garden)
- Deni Hines
- Dhee
- Elen Levon
- George Maple
- Grace Barbé
- Grentperez
- Hayley Warner
- Jessica Mauboy
- Johnny Ruffo
- Kevin Parker (Tame Impala)
- Luke Hemmings
- Mali-Koa Hood
- Miss Kaninna
- Monique Brumby
- Natalie Imbruglia
- Orianthi
- Paulini
- Ricki-Lee Coulter
- Sarah Blasko
- Selwyn
- Silia Kapsis
- The Veronicas
- Troye Sivan

Austria

- Cesár Sampson
- Dalal Bruchmann
- Nathan Trent
- Vincent Bueno

Azerbaijan

- Jiva
- Samir Javadzadeh

Bahamas

- Avvy
- Angelique Sabrina
- Iris Stryx

Belarus

- Ilya Volkov

Belgium

- Angèle
- Barbara Dex
- Belle Perez
- Brahim Attaeb
- Emma Bale
- Jérémie Makiese
- Laura Tesoro
- Loïc Nottet
- Mustii
- Natalia

Bolivia

- Javvi Elias

Bosnia and Herzegovina

- Anabela

Brazil

- Anitta
- Bebel Gilberto
- Claudia Leitte
- Cléo Pires
- Iara Rennó
- Iza
- Jullie
- Kiko Dinucci
- Lexa
- Luísa Maita
- Luiza Possi
- Maria Rita
- Marina Elali
- Natalia Damini
- Nívea Soares
- Patricia Marx
- Paula Lima
- Preta Gil
- Priscilla Alcantara
- Sandy
- Tássia Reis
- Thais Carla
- Tulipa Ruiz
- Wanessa Camargo
- Xênia França

Bulgaria

- El Ma
- Mira Aroyo
- Sofi Marinova

Cameroon

- Asaba
- Blick Bassy
- Coco Argentée
- Irma
- Lady Ponce
- Naomi Achu
- Reniss
- Salatiel

Canada

- Allan Rayman
- Ammoye
- Aphrose
- Ariane Moffatt
- Beatrice Deer
- Celine Dion
- Ceréna
- Deborah Cox
- Drake
- Emmanuelle Proulx (Men I Trust)
- Essosa
- Fefe Dobson
- Francesco Yates
- Gary Beals
- Glenn Lewis
- Grimes
- Iamtheliving
- Jully Black
- Justin Bieber
- Karl Wolf
- Kellylee Evans
- Keonte Beals
- Kiesza
- Kreesha Turner
- Laila Biali
- Lauren Babic
- Lindsay Ell
- Lyldoll
- Malika Tirolien
- Martha Wainwright
- Massari
- Maylee Todd
- Melanie Durrant
- Melanie Fiona
- Melissa Molinaro
- Michael Bublé
- Nasri (Magic!)
- Pierre Kwenders
- Raghav
- RealestK
- Roy Woods
- Serena Ryder
- Shane Shu
- Shawn Desman
- Tanika Charles
- Tanya Tagaq
- Tegan and Sara
- The Weeknd
- Victoria Duffield
- Zaki Ibrahim

Cape Verde

- Gil Semedo

Chile

- Claudia Acuña
- K-Réena

China

- Ablajan Awut Ayup
- Leah Dou
- Vivi Jiang

Colombia

- ChocQuibTown
- Esther Anaya
- Greeicy
- Maluma

Croatia

- Jure Brkljača
- Nina Badrić
- Petar Grašo

Cyprus

- Theo Evan
- Ziynet Sali

Czech Republic

- Heidi Janků
- Markéta Morávková (Alia Tempora)
- Petra Pudová

Democratic Republic of the Congo

- Félix Wazekwa
- Innoss'B
- Koffi Olomide
- Stino Mubi
- Werrason

Denmark

- Aura Dione
- Christopher
- Clara Sofie
- Ida Corr
- Julie Berthelsen
- Junior Senior
- Medina
- Mette Lindberg

Dominican Republic

- Yendry

Ecuador

- Daniel Betancourth

Egypt

- Nathalie Saba

England

- Adele
- Alex Cartañá
- Alexandra Burke
- AlunaGeorge
- Amelle Berrabah (Sugababes)
- Amy Winehouse
- Arctic Monkeys
- Arjun
- Ayanna Witter-Johnson
- Bat for Lashes
- Bipolar Sunshine
- Brian Molko (Placebo)
- Calum Scott
- Carla Marie Williams
- Cathy Dennis
- Célena Cherry (Honeyz)
- Chris Martin (Coldplay)
- Clean Bandit
- Cleo Higgins (Cleopatra)
- Craig David
- Debbie Kurup
- Dev Hynes (Blood Orange)
- Dornik
- Ed Sheeran
- Estelle
- Everything Everything
- Fleur East
- Gabrielle
- Hard Kaur
- Heartworms
- Honne
- Ian Brown (The Stone Roses)
- Imogen Heap
- J.P. Bimeni
- Jai Paul
- Jamelia
- James Arthur
- James Bay
- James Morrison
- Jamie Lidell
- Javine Hylton
- Jay Kay (Jamiroquai)
- Jay Sean
- Jessie J
- John Newman
- Kae Tempest
- Katongo
- Katy B
- Keisha Buchanan (Sugababes)
- La Roux
- Laura Bettinson
- Laura Mvula
- Leah McFall
- Lee Henry
- Lemar
- Leona Lewis
- Liam Payne
- Makayla Malaka
- Mark Ronson
- Marsha Ambrosius
- Matthew Murphy (The Wombats)
- Matty Healy (The 1975)
- M.I.A.
- Mira Aroyo (Ladytron)
- Misha B
- Muse
- Natasha Bedingfield
- Olly Alexander
- Olly Murs
- Paloma Faith
- Passenger
- Peter Andre
- PinkPantheress
- Rex Orange County
- Rita Ora
- Ryan De La Cruz
- Sam Tompkins
- Samm Henshaw
- Sampha
- Simon Webbe (Blue)
- Sinéad Harnett
- Supergrass
- Sway
- Tom Chaplin (Keane)
- Tom Meighan (Kasabian)
- Tom Misch
- Zayn Malik

Estonia

- Alika Milova
- Jana Kask
- Kadri Voorand
- Kerli
- Lauri Pihlap
- Liis Lemsalu
- Nele-Liis Vaiksoo
- Ott Lepland

Ethiopia

- Sancho Gebre
- Zeritu Kebede

Faroe Islands

- Reiley

Finland

- Alma
- Anssi Kela
- Chisu
- Jonna Tervomaa
- Kiki
- Kim Herold
- Laura Voutilainen
- Robin Packalen
- Sini Koskelainen (Tuuletar)
- Sofia Zida

France

- Aṣa
- Bilal Hassani
- Camille
- Cécile Cassel
- Chimène Badi
- Clarisse Albrecht
- Clémentine Delauney (Visions of Atlantis)
- Cyrille Aimée
- David Guetta
- Emma Daumas
- Hélène Ségara
- Indila
- Irma
- Jehnny Beth
- Juliette Armanet
- Justice
- Kany
- Melody Prochet
- Nâdiya
- Rahim Redcar
- Sonia Ben Ammar
- Sophie Delila
- Stomy Bugsy
- Tal
- Xavier de Rosnay (Justice)
- Zaz

Georgia

- Andria Putkaradze
- Bera Ivanishvili
- Mariam Shengelia
- Nutsa Buzaladze

Germany

- Alev Lenz
- Ayo
- Ellen Allien
- KeyLiza (Sistanova)
- Kim Petras
- Nana
- Natalie Horler (Cascada)
- Nico Santos
- Sarah Connor
- Stella von Schöneberg
- Vanessa Mai
- Zoe Wees

Ghana

- Blitz the Ambassador
- Camidoh
- GuiltyBeatz
- Gyakie
- Knii Lante
- Kobi Onyame
- KOJOBLAK
- Kuami Eugene
- Kweku Darlington
- Moliy
- Mr Drew
- Nxwrth
- Ofori Amponsah
- Okyeame Kwame
- Pappy Kojo
- Wiyaala

Greece

- Athena Manoukian
- Eleni Foureira
- Sakis Rouvas
- Yianna Terzi

Guam

- Pia Mia

Haiti

- Gazzman Couleur
- Wyclef Jean

Hong Kong

- Aaron Kwok
- Andy Lau
- Coco Lee
- Jackson Wang
- Khalil Fong

Hungary

- Gabi Tóth
- Viktor Király

Iceland

- Björk
- Svala

India

- A. R. Rahman
- Aditi Singh Sharma
- Akshara Haasan
- Akshat Singh
- Amrutha Suresh
- Ayushi Khurana
- Benny Dayal
- Diljit Dosanjh
- Falu
- Farah Khan
- Ganesh Acharya
- Ganesh Hegde
- Hiphop Tamizha
- Hrithik Roshan
- Kaushiki Chakraborty
- Ketaki Mategaonkar
- Mahalakshmi Iyer
- Malavika
- Manasi Scott
- Monali Thakur
- Neha Bhasin
- Pinky Maidasani
- Prabhu Deva
- Priya Darshini
- Priyanka Chopra
- Raageshwari Loomba
- Ranjini Jose
- Remo D'Souza
- Renuka Arun
- Runa Rizvi
- Samira Koppikar
- Sanam
- Sangeetha Rajeev
- Shalmali Kholgade
- Shibani Kashyap
- Shilpa Rao
- Smita
- Sonakshi Sinha
- Sonu Nigam
- Sridevi
- Sunidhi Chauhan
- Sunitha Sarathy
- SuVi
- Swati Sharma
- Tara Sutaria
- Tiger Shroff
- Varijashree Venugopal

Indonesia

- Afgan
- Agnez Mo
- Chelsea Olivia
- Dewi Sandra
- Indah Dewi Pertiwi
- Maia Estianty
- Naura Ayu
- Pinkan Mambo
- Sherina Munaf
- Vidi Aldiano
- Yura Yunita

Ireland

- Aoife Scott
- Brídín Brennan
- Frances Black
- Gemma Hayes
- Jazzy
- Karan Casey
- Lisa Hannigan
- Lynn Hilary
- Orla Gartland
- Roberta Howett
- Samantha Mumba
- Seán Hayden (December 10)
- Westlife

Israel

- Kathleen Reiter
- Mor Karbasi
- Nadav Guedj
- Noam Bettan
- Stéphane Legar

Italy

- Andrea Di Giovanni
- Arisa
- Baby K
- Cara
- Casadilego
- Chiara Iezzi (Paola & Chiara)
- Cristina Scabbia (Lacuna Coil)
- Elisa
- Elodie
- Gaia
- Ghali
- Giorgia
- Irene Grandi
- Madame
- Michele Perniola
- Mietta
- Renzo Rubino
- Paola Iezzi (Paola & Chiara)
- Sabina Sciubba
- Senhit
- Sofia Tornambene
- Tära

Ivory Coast

- Dobet Gnahoré

Jamaica

- Andru Donalds
- Barrington Levy
- Duane Stephenson
- Kashief Lindo
- Krishane
- Lila Iké
- Tommy Lee Sparta

Japan

- Ai
- Amy Harvey (XG)
- Beni
- Crystal Kay
- Daichi Miura
- Hitomi Yoshizawa
- Mai Kuraki
- Misako Uno
- Nana Tanimura
- Rina Sawayama
- Rino Nakasone
- Takahiro Moriuchi (One Ok Rock)
- Toshinobu Kubota
- Yuna Ito

Kazakhstan

- Dimash Qudaibergen

Kenya

- Avril
- Blinky Bill
- Wyre

Kosovo

- Butrint Imeri
- Dafina Zeqiri
- Genta Ismajli
- Lindita
- Malda Susuri

Latvia

- Aminata Savadogo
- Justs Sirmais
- Katrīna Gupalo

Lebanon

- Hiba Tawaji

Lithuania

- Donny Montell

Malaysia

- Najwa Mahiaddin
- Yuka Kharisma
- Yuna

Malawi

- Theo Thomson
- Zani Challe

Mali

- Inna Modja

Malta

- Rachel Fabri
- Stefan Galea

Mexico

- Anahí
- Ari Borovoy
- Cristian Castro
- Gloria Trevi
- Lucero
- Luis Miguel
- Paty Cantú
- Paulina Rubio
- Yuri

Moldova

- Anton Ragoza (SunStroke Project)
- Lena Scissorhands (Infected Rain)

Mozambique

- MoYah
- Neyma

Myanmar

- Ah Moon

Netherlands

- Adje
- Anita Doth (2 Unlimited)
- Boris Titulaer
- Cho
- Cilvaringz
- Desray
- Esmée Denters
- Glennis Grace
- Hind Laroussi
- Jennie Lena
- Lange Frans
- Leonie Meijer
- Naomi Sharon
- Natalie La Rose
- Nelson Freitas
- Phreako Rico (Opgezwolle)
- Ray Slijngaard (2 Unlimited)
- Ronnie Flex
- Sabrina Starke
- Sevn Alias
- Trijntje Oosterhuis
- Typhoon
- Waylon

New Zealand

- Aaradhna
- Anna Coddington
- Beau Monga
- Chelsea Jade
- Dudley Benson
- Georgia Lines
- Ginny Blackmore
- Jan Hellriegel
- Kimbra
- Lynette Diaz
- NOURI
- Paige
- Stevie Tonks
- Unknown Mortal Orchestra
- Zowie

Nigeria

- Ayo Jay
- Bad Boy Timz
- Chidinma
- Davido
- Davina Oriakhi
- Frank Edwards
- Goldie Harvey
- Harrysong
- Jeff Akoh
- Joeboy
- Lojay
- May D
- May7ven
- Moelogo
- Mr. P
- Nikki Laoye
- Ninety
- Ossy Brown
- Oxlade
- P-Square
- Praiz
- Reekado Banks
- Sean Tizzle
- Seyi Vibez
- Tolu Adesina
- Wande Coal
- Wurld

Northern Ireland

- Gary Lightbody (Snow Patrol)
- Ryan Dolan

Norway

- Annie
- Astrid S
- Ida Maria
- Ingrid Olava
- Julie Bergan
- Kygo
- Nico & Vinz
- Tora Dahle Aagård

Oman

- Sham Maskari

Pakistan

- Arooj Aftab
- Fariha Pervez
- Hasan Jahangir
- Natasha Baig
- Zohaib Kazi

Panama

- Ingrid de Ycaza

Peru

- Renata Flores

Philippines

- 4th Impact
- Aga Muhlach
- Aicelle Santos
- Billy Crawford
- Darren Espanto
- Gary Valenciano
- Geneva Cruz
- Isabelle de Leon
- Jake Zyrus
- Jason Dy
- Jay R
- Jona Viray
- Kiana Valenciano
- Kris Lawrence
- Kyla
- Mica Javier
- Nadine Lustre
- Regine Velasquez
- Remi Wolf
- Sarah Geronimo
- Yeng Constantino
- Ylona Garcia

Poland

- Agnieszka Chylińska
- Ania
- Blanka
- Edyta Herbuś
- Ewa Farna
- Ifi Ude
- Justyna Steczkowska
- Kasia Dereń
- Michał Szpak
- Monika Brodka
- Natalia Kukulska
- Natalia Szroeder
- Patricia Kazadi
- Schafter
- Smolasty

Portugal

- Sara Tavares

Puerto Rico

- Daddy Yankee
- Ricky Martin
- Zion & Lennox

Romania

- Alexandra Stan
- Anda Adam
- Dana Nălbaru
- Ester Peony
- Ilinca Băcilă
- Smiley
- Theodor Andrei

Saint Vincent and the Grenadines

- Kevin Lyttle

São Tomé and Príncipe

- Calema

Scotland

- Amy Macdonald
- Chvrches
- Donnie Burns
- Emeli Sandé
- Helen Marnie (Ladytron)
- Kerri Watt

Senegal

- Alioune Mbaye Nder

Serbia

- Gru
- Tijana Bogićević

Singapore

- ALYPH
- Daphne Khoo
- JJ Lin
- Maia Lee
- Taufik Batisah

Slovakia

- Adéla
- Barbara Haščáková
- Hanka G
- Mária Čírová
- Marián Čekovský (No Name)
- Nela Pocisková
- Petra Humeňanská
- Tina
- Tomáš Bezdeda
- Zdenka Predná

Slovenia

- Alya
- Ben Dolic
- Omar Naber
- Sanja Grohar
- Senidah
- Trkaj

Somalia

- Nimco Happy

South Africa

- Armand Joubert
- Candice Pillay
- Danny K
- DJ Zinhle
- Gigi Lamayne
- Musa Keys
- Ntobeko Sishi
- PJ Powers
- RJ Benjamin
- Sasha-Lee Davids
- Thandiswa Mazwai
- Tyla
- Zain Bhikha
- Zoë Modiga
- Zolani Mahola (Freshlyground)

South Korea

- Babylon
- Bae Jin-young
- Baekhyun (Exo)
- Bang Ye-dam (Treasure)
- BoA
- Cha Eun-woo
- Chung Ha
- CL (2NE1)
- Dayoung (WJSN)
- Dino (Seventeen)
- Eunhyuk
- Evan
- Fatou Samba (Blackswan)
- Haechan
- Hongjoong (Ateez)
- Hwang So-yoon (Se So Neon)
- Hyun Jin-young
- Hyuna
- IU
- J.Y. Park
- J-Hope (BTS)
- James (Cortis)
- Jang Wooyoung
- Jay Park
- Jimin (BTS)
- Jonghyun (Shinee)
- Joohoney (Monsta X)
- Jung Kook (BTS)
- Kai (Exo)
- Kim Junsu
- Kim Sung-soo (Cool)
- Lee Hi
- Lia Kim
- Lim Jeong-hee
- Lee Jin-hyuk
- Lee Soo-man
- Leo (VIXX)
- Luna (f(x))
- Lua (Weki Meki)
- Minzy (2NE1)
- Miryo (Brown Eyed Girls)
- Newbeat
- Nicole Jung (Kara)
- Park Cho-a (AOA)
- Park Jin-young
- Rain
- Rosé (Blackpink)
- Saay
- Sana (Twice)
- Seo Taiji (Seo Taiji and Boys)
- Seven
- Solar (Mamamoo)
- Son Seung-yeon
- Soobin
- Sumin
- Sunwoo Jung-a
- Taemin (Shinee)
- Taeyang (BigBang)
- Wheein (Mamamoo)
- Wonbin (Riize)
- Yoo Taeyang (SF9)
- Yang Hyun-suk (Seo Taiji and Boys)
- YooA
- Yoon Mi-rae
- Yuna (Itzy)
- Yunho
- Yuki (Purple Kiss)

Spain

- Abraham Mateo
- Alfred García
- Barei
- Chenoa
- Concha Buika
- Enrique Iglesias
- Julia Martín
- Marilia Andrés Casares
- Nathy Peluso
- Niña Pastori
- Pablo Alborán
- Ruslana Panchyshyna

Sri Lanka

- Dushyanth Weeraman

Suriname

- Damaru

Sweden

- Alesso
- Alina Devecerski
- Andreas Moe
- Avicii
- Benjamin Ingrosso
- Darin
- Dea Norberg
- Dead by April
- Edda Magnason
- Elin Lanto
- Emelie Irewald
- Eric Saade
- Frida Hyvönen
- Gathania Holmgren
- Icona Pop
- Jessica Folcker
- John Lundvik
- Katerina Kazelis
- Linn Berggren (Ace of Base)
- Loreen
- Lykke Li
- Måns Zelmerlöw
- Mohombi
- Neneh Cherry
- Paulinda Crescentini (Daybehavior)
- Pauline Kamusewu
- Robin Stjernberg
- Robyn
- Saga Ludvigsson
- Sanna Nielsen
- Snoh Aalegra
- Zara Larsson

Switzerland

- Paolo Meneguzzi
- Seven
- Stefanie Heinzmann
- Veronica Fusaro

Taiwan

- 9m88
- A-Mei
- Elva Hsiao
- Eve Ai

Tanzania

- Abigail Chams
- Diamond Platnumz
- Issa Michuzi
- Mbosso
- Mr. Ebbo
- Rayvanny
- Rose Mhando

Thailand

- Tata Young

Trinidad and Tobago

- GBM Nutron
- Machel Montano
- Sherwin Gardner

Turkey

- Edis
- Gripin
- Hayko Cepkin
- İrem Derici
- Kaan Akalın
- Tarkan

Uganda

- A Pass
- Jackie Chandiru
- Jose Chameleone
- Joshua Baraka
- Michael Ross Kakooza
- Pallaso
- Sandra Nankoma

Ukraine

- Alekseev
- Gaitana
- Mika Newton
- Oleksandr Balabanov

United Arab Emirates

- Balqees
- Hamdan Al Abri
- Layla Kaylif

United States

- 070 Shake
- 2 Chainz
- 6lack
- Aaliyah
- Aaron Bruno
- Ab-Soul
- Adam Duritz (Counting Crows)
- Adam Levine (Maroon 5)
- Addison Rae
- Adina Howard
- Affion Crockett
- Aimee Allen
- Akon
- Alaina Castillo
- Alex Isley
- Alexis Jordan
- Alicia Keys
- Alina Smith
- Allie Gonino
- Aloe Blacc
- Amaarae
- Amel Larrieux
- Amerie
- Amir Obè
- Amira Unplugged
- Amy Lee (Evanescence)
- Amythyst Kiah
- Anderson .Paak
- Andrea Martin
- Angel Deradoorian
- Annet Artani
- Anthony Hamilton
- Anthony Kiedis (Red Hot Chili Peppers)
- Antoine Fuqua
- Antonique Smith
- Ariana Grande
- Ariel Pink
- Ashanti
- Ashley Tisdale
- Aubrey Anderson-Emmons
- Aubrey Logan
- Autumn Rowe
- AverySunshine
- Babyface
- Bazzi
- Beanie Sigel
- Beck
- Becca Stevens
- Bette Smith
- Beyoncé
- Billy Martin (Good Charlotte)
- BJ the Chicago Kid
- Bonnie McKee
- Bobby V
- Brandy
- Britney Spears
- Brittany Bosco
- Brittany Howard
- Brooke Candy
- Bruno Mars
- Buckethead
- Camila Cabello
- Caroline Rose
- Carrie Brownstein
- Case
- Cat Power
- Chance Perez (In Real Life)
- Chance the Rapper
- Charlie Puth
- Cheryl Pepsii Riley
- Chester Bennington (Linkin Park)
- Chilli (TLC)
- China Anne McClain
- Chingy
- Chris Bender
- Chris Brown
- Chris Cornell (Soundgarden, Audioslave)
- Chris Willis
- Christina Aguilera
- Christina Milian
- Ciara
- Cindy Herron (En Vogue)
- Colby O'Donis
- Common
- Consequence
- Cook Classics
- Cookiee Kawaii
- Corbin Bleu
- Corey Clark
- Crystal Waters
- d4vd
- Da Brat
- Daphne Willis
- Dara Tucker
- Dave Keuning (The Killers)
- David Cook
- Day26
- Debbie Gibson
- Denyce Graves
- Deva Mahal
- DMX
- Don Toliver
- Donell Jones
- Donnie Klang
- Donnie Wahlberg (New Kids on the Block)
- Dorothy Martin
- Dray Skky
- Dryden Mitchell (Alien Ant Farm)
- Duckwrth
- Durand Bernarr
- Elisabeth Withers
- Elle Varner
- Elley Duhé
- Elise Testone
- Emily Estefan
- Emily King
- Emily Kokal (Warpaint)
- Emma Nyra
- Eric Bellinger
- Eric Hutchinson
- Eric Roberson
- Erika Jayne
- Evan Nicole Bell
- Far East Movement
- Fergie
- Force MDs
- Frankie J
- Freddie Gibbs
- Gabby Barrett
- Garth Brooks
- Gary Clark Jr.
- Gashi
- Gayatri Patel Bahl
- Grace Potter
- Greg Gonzalez (Cigarettes After Sex)
- Ginuwine
- Gucci Mane
- Gus Dapperton
- Hailie Sahar
- Haley Reinhart
- Hanson
- Heart (Ann Wilson, Nancy Wilson)
- Heather Baker
- How to Dress Well
- IDK
- Imagine Dragons
- Iniko
- Iron & Wine
- Isaiah Falls
- J. Cole
- J'Nai Bridges
- Jacob Latimore
- Jack White (The White Stripes)
- Jacquees
- Jacquie Lee
- Jadagrace
- Jade Novah
- Jamie Sparks
- Janelle Monáe
- Janet Jackson
- Janice McClain
- Jasmine V
- Jason Aalon Butler (Letlive)
- Jason Derulo
- Jason Mraz
- Jay-Z
- JD McCrary
- Jean Dawson
- Jeannie Ortega
- Jeff Timmons (98 Degrees)
- Jenevieve
- Jeremiah Green (Modest Mouse)
- Jeremih
- Jesse Boykins III
- Jesse McCartney
- Jessica Sutta (The Pussycat Dolls)
- Jessie James Decker
- Jidenna
- Jillian Hervey (Lion Babe)
- Jimmy Wayne
- John Mayer
- JoJo
- Jon B.
- Jordan Knight (New Kids on the Block)
- Jordin Sparks
- Josh Gracin
- Judith Hill
- Justin Timberlake
- Kam Franklin
- Kandi Burruss (Xscape)
- Kanye West
- Karen O (Yeah Yeah Yeahs)
- Karima Kibble (Virtue)
- Karyn White
- Kat Dahlia
- Kate Nauta
- Keke Palmer
- Kelela
- Kelis
- Kendrick Lamar
- Kenny Iko (4EY The Future)
- Kenna
- Kenyon Dixon
- Keri Hilson
- Kesha
- Kevin Ross
- Kilo Kish
- Kimberly Perry (The Band Perry)
- Kimberly Wyatt (The Pussycat Dolls)
- Kobe Bryant
- Koryn Hawthorne
- Krayzie Bone (Bone Thugs-n-Harmony)
- Krystal Harris
- La'Porsha Renae
- Lady Gaga
- Lajon Witherspoon (Sevendust)
- Lauren Mayhew
- Lawrence Lamont
- Lay Bankz
- Leah Turner
- Ledisi
- Leela James
- Lenny Kravitz
- Leon Bridges
- Leslie Grace
- LeToya Luckett
- LL Cool J
- Lil Kim
- Lil Nas X
- Lil Wayne
- Lin-Manuel Miranda
- Lindsey Stirling
- Lisa Kekaula
- Little Louie Vega
- Lizz Wright
- Lloyd
- Lola Blanc
- Loren Lott
- Louis Cole (Knower)
- Lucky Daye
- Luke Bryan
- Lyfe Jennings
- Machine Gun Kelly
- Maggie Rose
- Malina Moye
- Mapei
- Margaret Glaspy
- Maria Brink (In This Moment)
- Mariah Carey
- Mariah the Scientist
- Mark Hoppus (Blink-182)
- Mark Romanek
- Marques Houston
- Mary J. Blige
- Masego
- Matt Sallee (Pentatonix)
- Maxine Jones (En Vogue)
- Maxwell
- MC Hammer
- MC Jin
- Megan Lee
- Meghan Trainor
- Meklit Hadero
- Melinda Doolittle
- Melody Thornton (The Pussycat Dolls)
- Michael Angelakos (Passion Pit)
- Michael J. Woodard
- Michael McGough (Being as an Ocean)
- Michaela Jaé Rodriguez
- Michelle Chamuel
- Michelle Williams
- Mighty Mystic
- Mila Jam
- Miley Cyrus
- Misha Gabriel
- Missy Elliott
- Molly Grace
- Molly Kate Kestner
- Monica
- Montana Tucker
- Mooski
- Mya
- Myles Frost
- Myracle Holloway
- N'Dambi
- Naima Adedapo
- Nas
- Naya Rivera
- Nef the Pharaoh
- Nic Newsham (Gatsbys American Dream)
- Nick Jonas
- Nick Martin (Sleeping with Sirens)
- Nicole Scherzinger (The Pussycat Dolls)
- Nicole Wray
- Nicole Zuraitis
- Ne-Yo
- Normani
- Offset
- Omar Apollo
- Omarion
- Paloma Ford
- Paris Jackson
- Pat Monahan (Train)
- Patrick Stump (Fall Out Boy)
- Paul Banks (Interpol)
- Pearl Jam
- Pete Wentz (Fall Out Boy)
- Pharrell Williams
- PJ Morton
- Playboi Carti
- Queen Latifah
- Rachel Platten
- Raheem DeVaughn
- Rahsaan Patterson
- Raja Kumari
- Ralph Tresvant (New Edition)
- Raphael Saadiq
- Rascal Flatts
- Raury
- Raven-Symoné
- Redfoo (LMFAO)
- Redman
- Renée Elise Goldsberry
- Rick Ross
- Ricky Bell (New Edition)
- Rikki Rockett (Poison)
- Riovaz
- Rissi Palmer
- Robby Blackwell
- Robin Thicke
- Roddy Ricch
- Rotimi
- Roshon Fegan
- Ryan Destiny
- Ryan Merchant (Capital Cities)
- Ryan Rabin (Grouplove)
- Ryan Leslie
- Ryan Toby (City High)
- Sameer Gadhia (Young the Giant)
- Samantha Urbani
- Samara Joy
- Scissor Sisters
- Sean Garrett
- Sean Kingston
- Sean Momberger
- Selena
- Sevyn Streeter
- Shanice
- Shawn Stockman (Boyz II Men)
- Shelby J.
- Siedah Garrett
- Sierra Hull
- Sisqó
- Sky Blu (LMFAO)
- Sky Ferreira
- Sleigh Bells
- Snoop Dogg
- Sofia Carson
- Solange Knowles
- Soul for Real
- St. Vincent
- Stephanie McKay
- Stephanie Topalian
- Sufjan Stevens
- Sy Smith
- Syleena Johnson
- T-Boz (TLC)
- Taboo (Black Eyed Peas)
- Tammy Ealom (Dressy Bessy)
- Tanerélle
- TaQuita Thorns
- Tauren Wells
- Tay Walker
- Teairra Mari
- Terry Lane
- Teyana Taylor
- Theophilus London
- The Civil Wars
- The Claypool Lennon Delirium
- The Game
- The Newton Brothers
- Thomas Rhett
- Tiara Thomas
- Tiffany Evans
- Tina Harris
- Tinashe
- Toby Lightman
- Tommy Richman
- Tone Stith
- Tori Kelly
- Trace Repeat
- Travis Scott
- Trevor Jackson
- Trey Songz
- Tweet
- Tyler, the Creator
- Tyler Glenn (Neon Trees)
- Tyra Bolling
- Usher
- Vanessa Hudgens
- Vanessa Williams
- VanJess
- Victor Wooten
- Victoria Justice
- Victoria Monét
- Vivian Green
- Vivica A. Fox
- Wale
- Will.i.am
- William DuVall (Alice in Chains)
- Xavion
- Yahzarah
- YK Osiris
- Young Thug
- Zach Myers (Shinedown)
- Zella Day
- Zendaya

Uruguay

- Julieta Rada
- Luana Persíncula

Venezuela

- Kiara
- Rawayana

Vietnam

- Dương Triệu Vũ
- Hiền Thục
- Hồ Quỳnh Hương
- Khổng Tú Quỳnh
- Mai Khôi
- Mai Phương Thúy
- Mỹ Tâm
- Thanh Lam

Wales

- Jamie Miller
- Rachel K Collier

Zambia

- Dambisa

Zimbabwe

- Chiwoniso Maraire
- Leonard Zhakata
- Tamy Moyo
- Taps Mugadza

== Influence on other performers ==
=== Earliest inspiration ===
Major soloists have spoken of Michael Jackson's pivotal effect on their dream of becoming a singer or as an early inspiration:

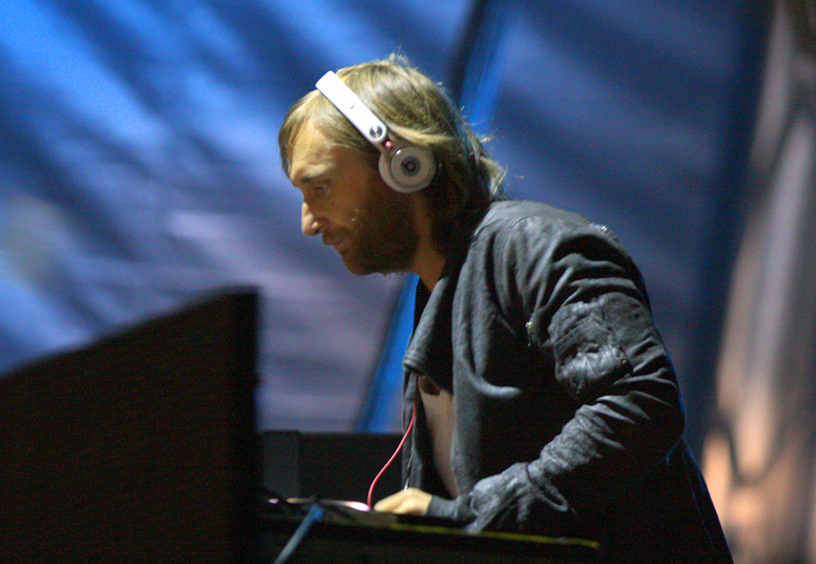
David Guetta

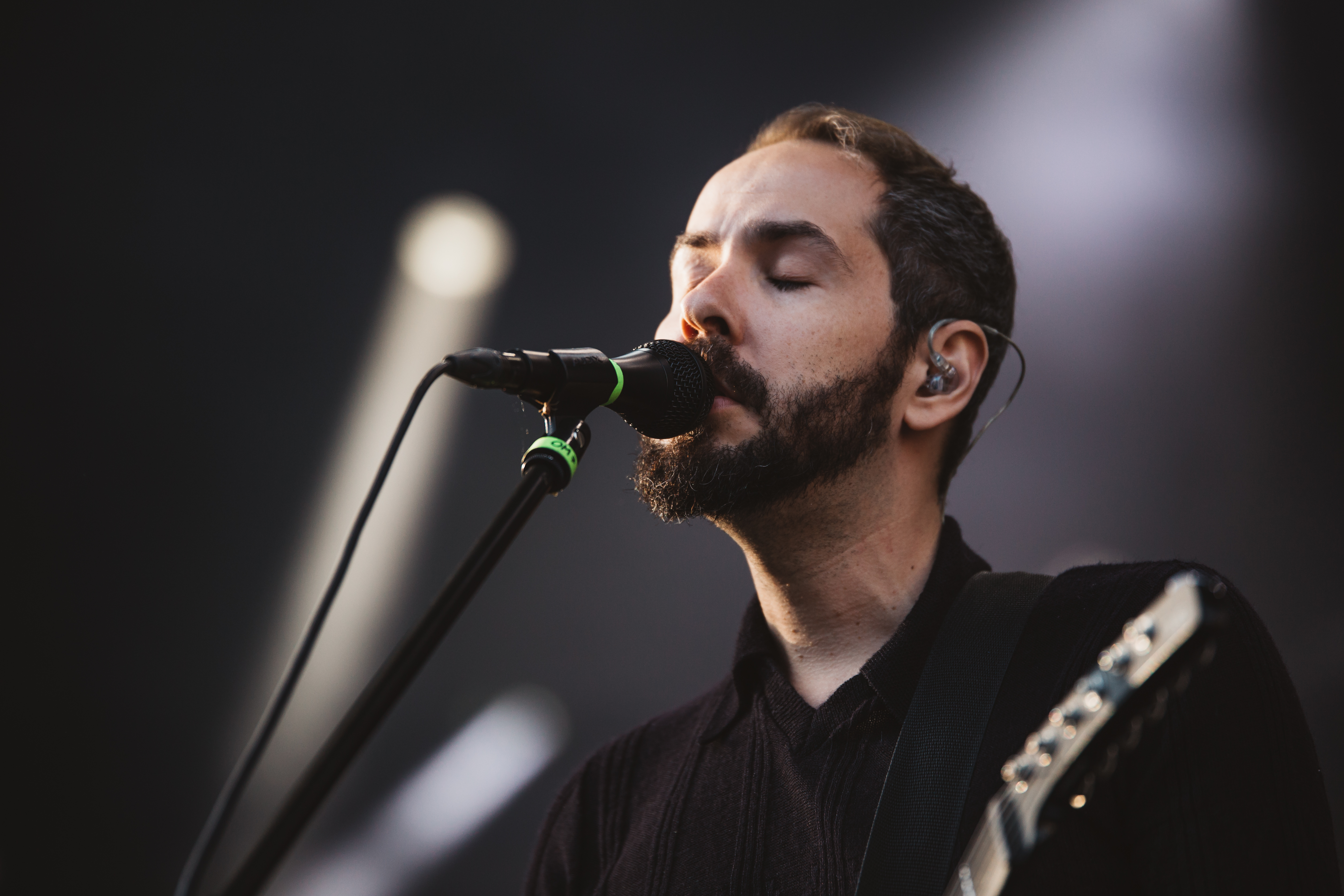
Cigarettes After Sex

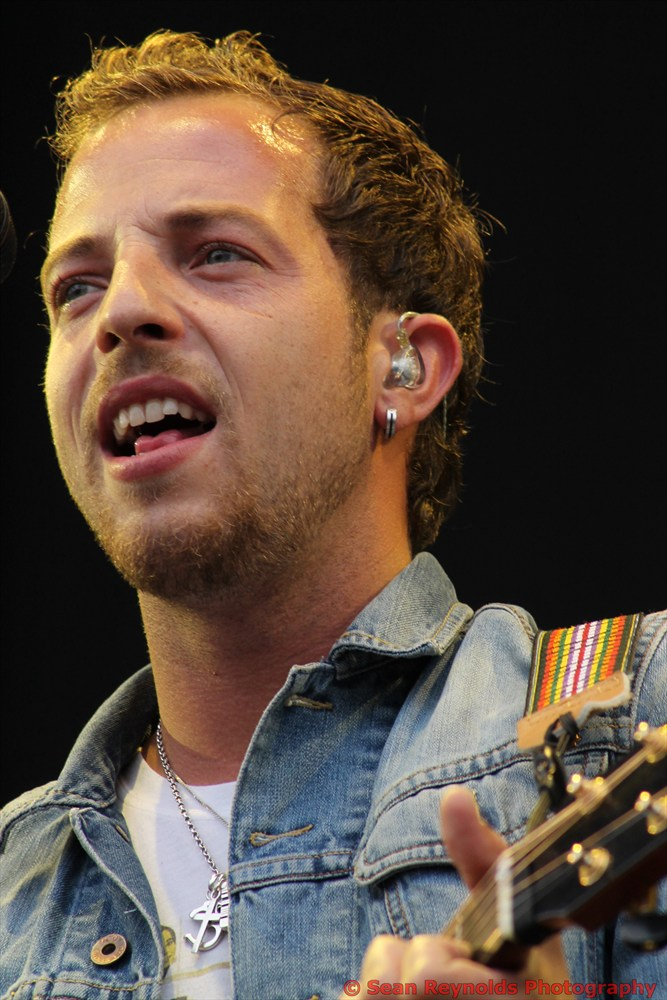
James Morrison

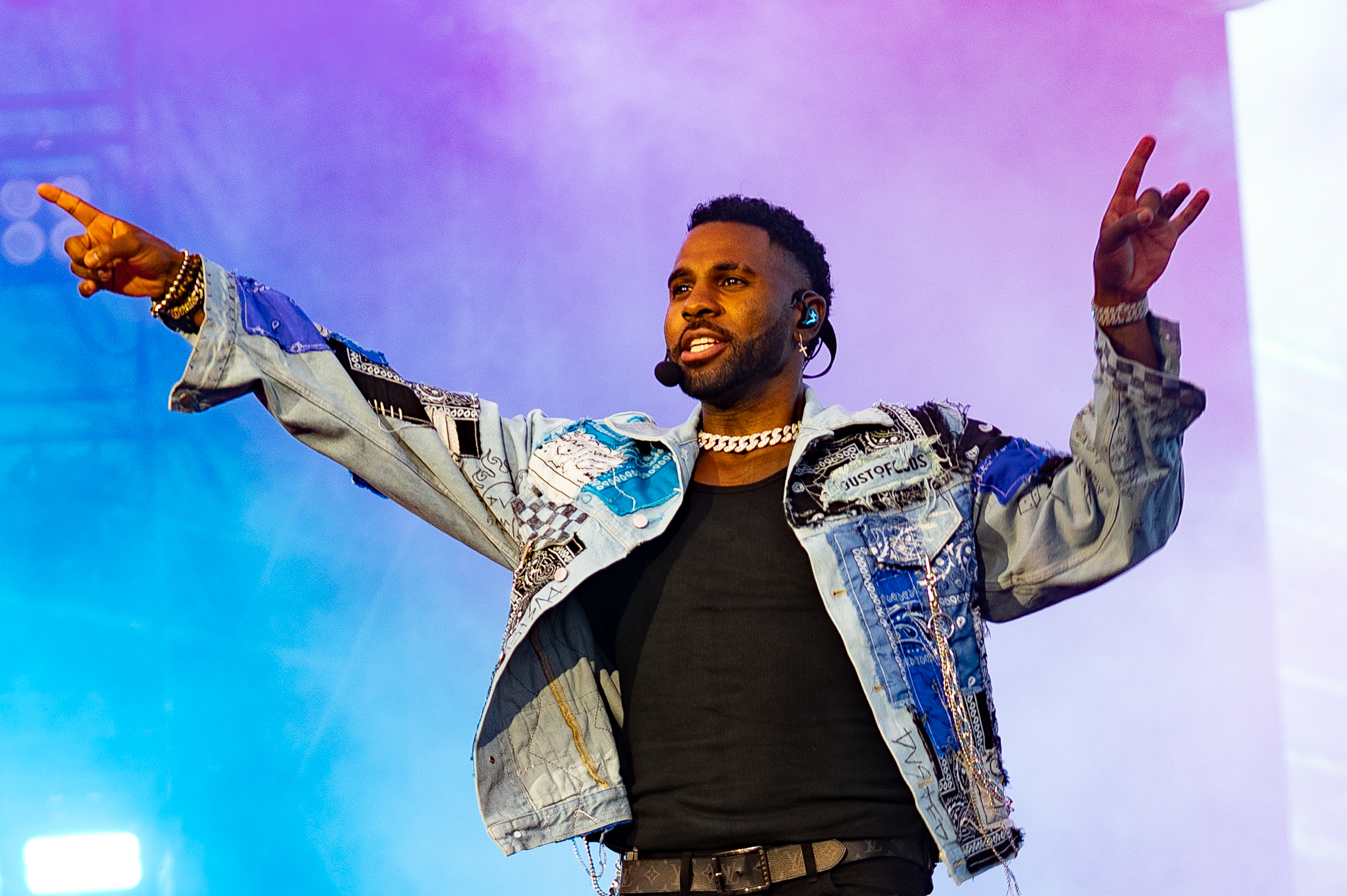
Jason Derulo

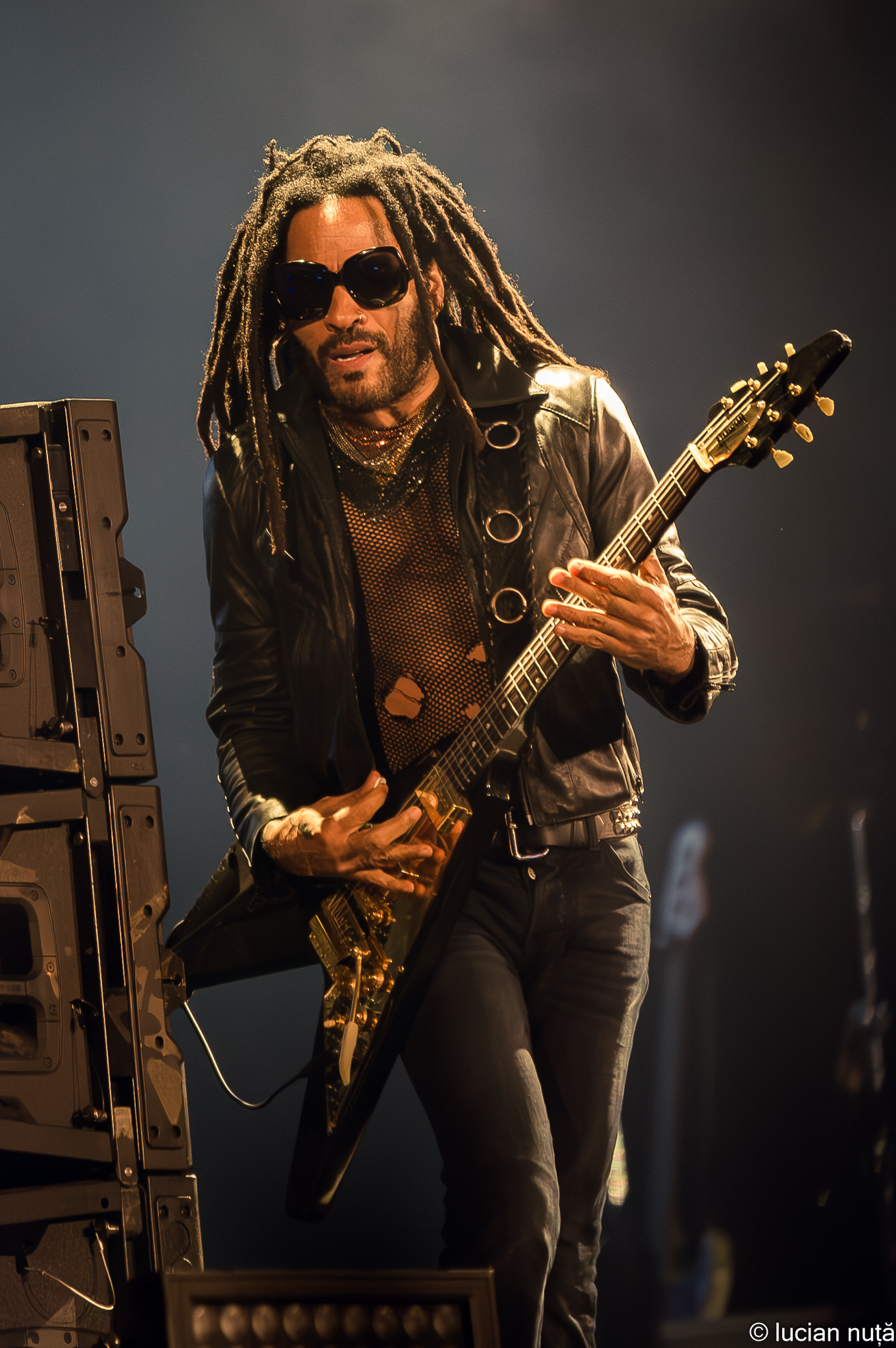
Lenny Kravitz

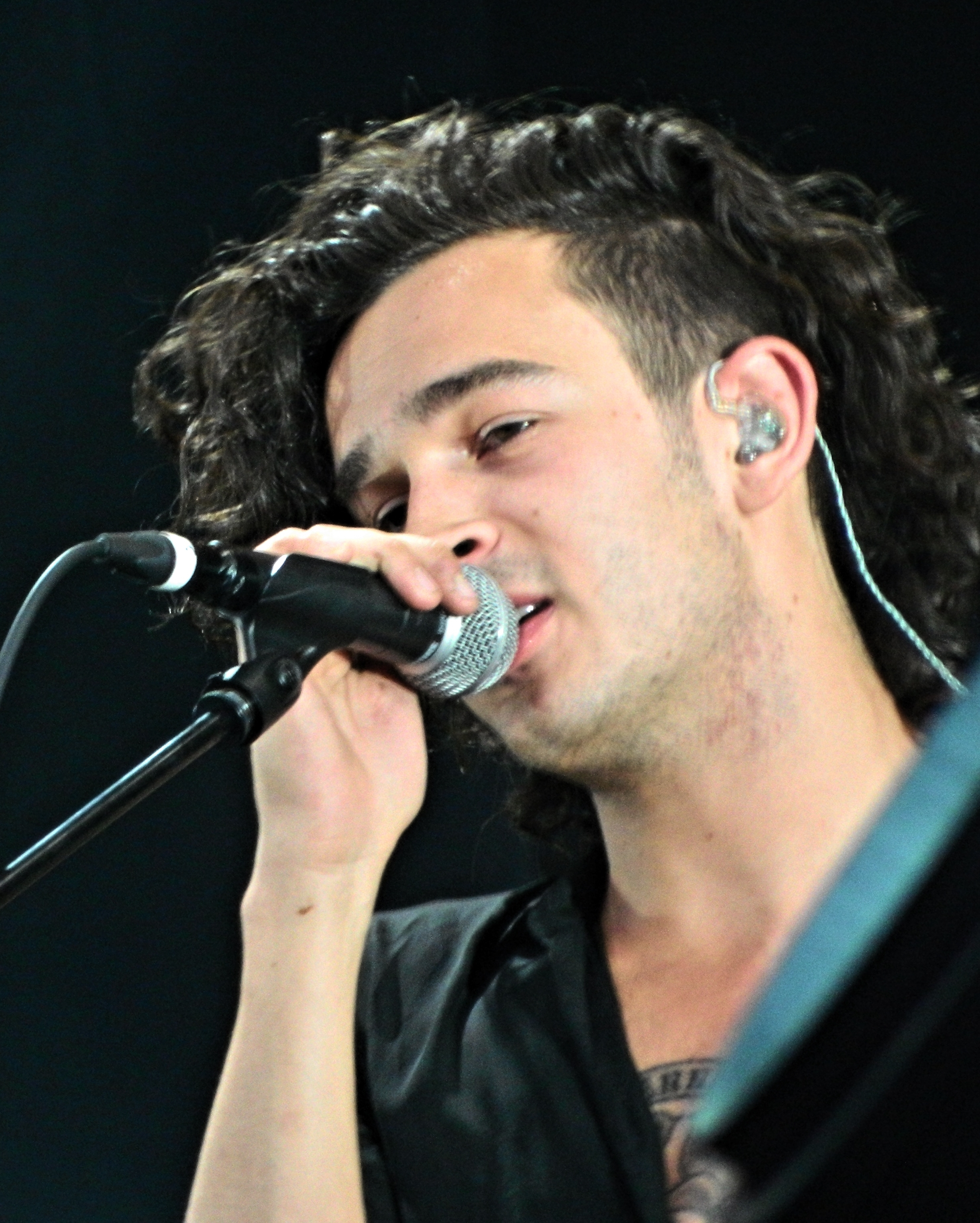
Matty Healy

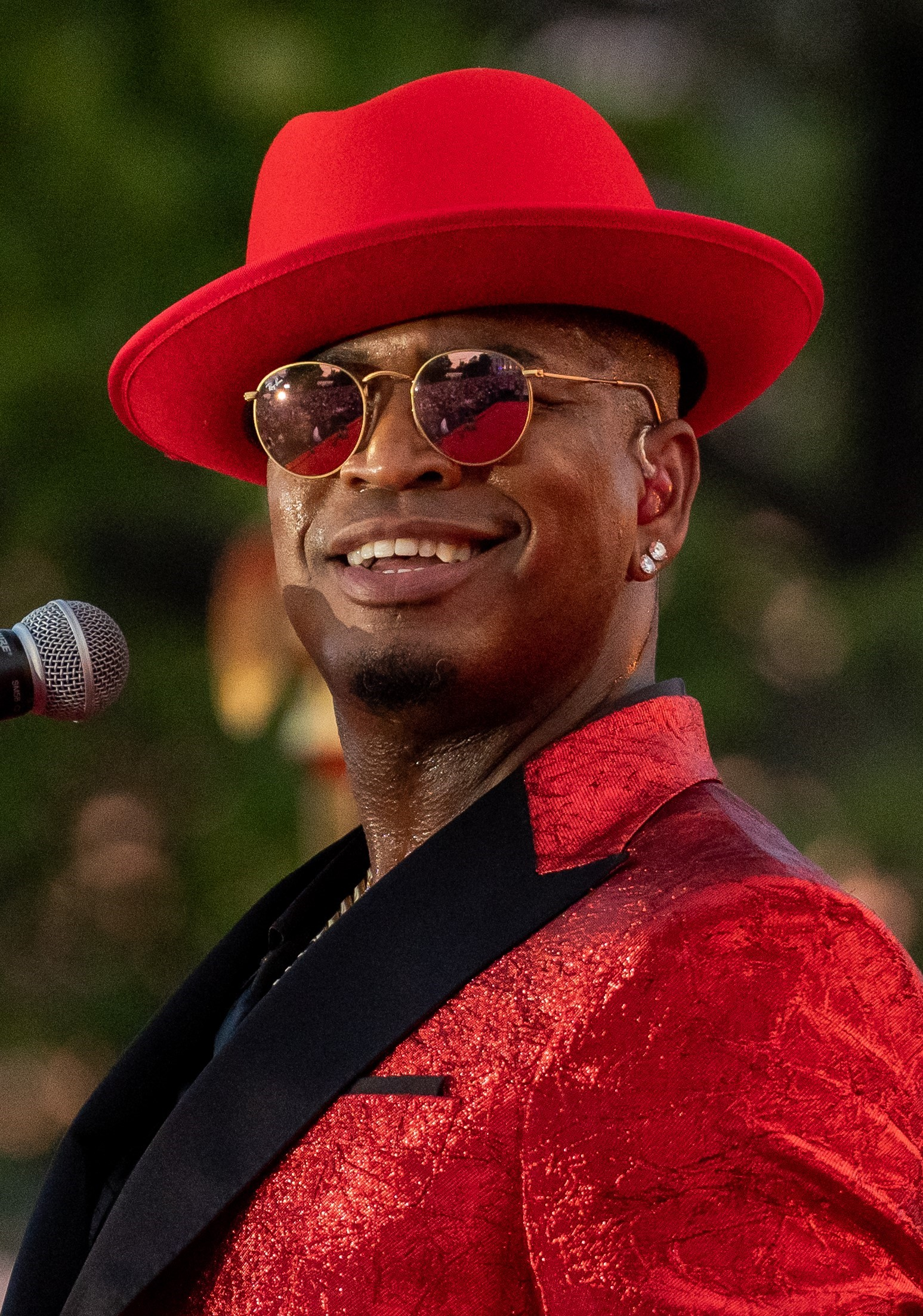
Ne-Yo

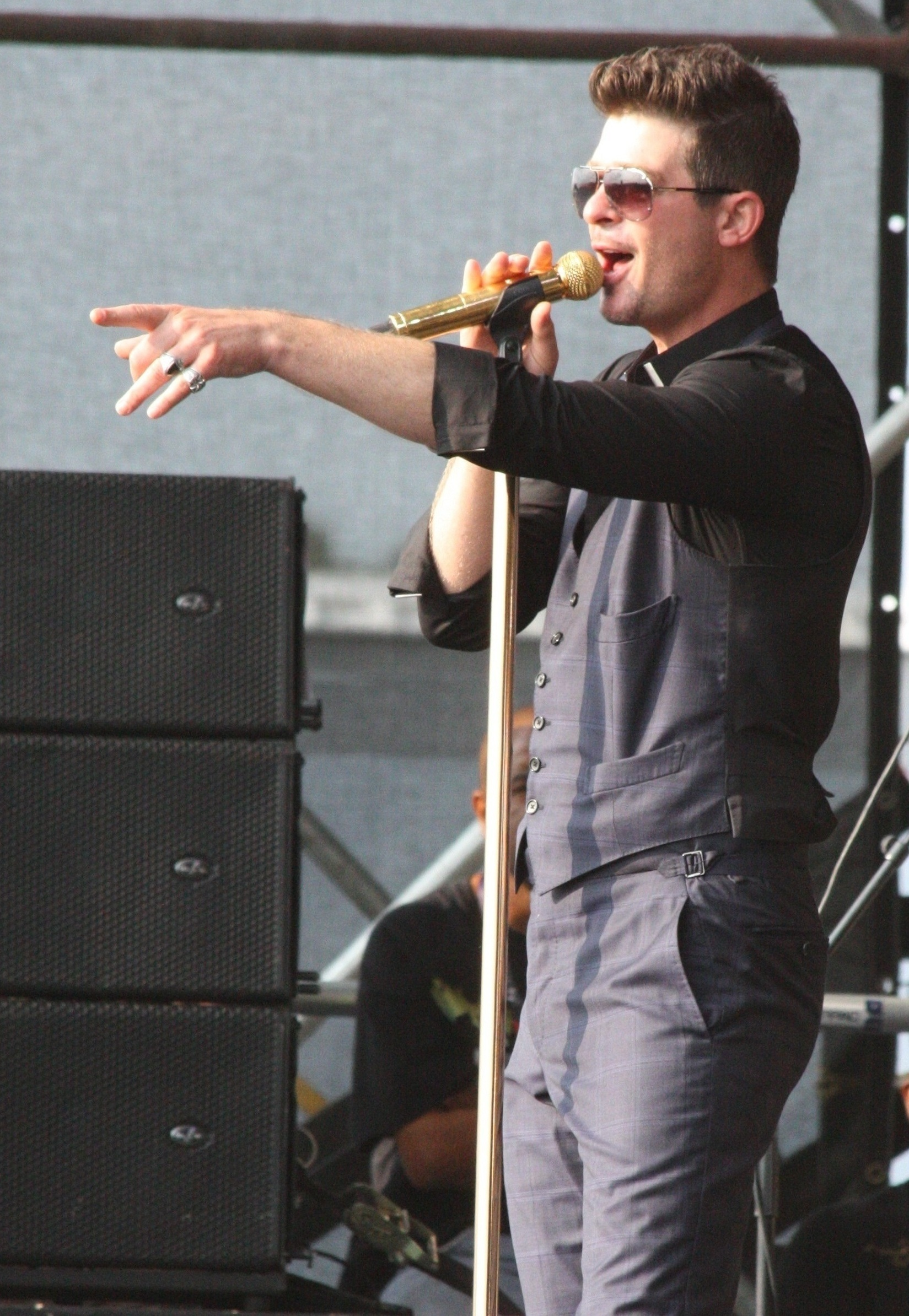
Robin Thicke

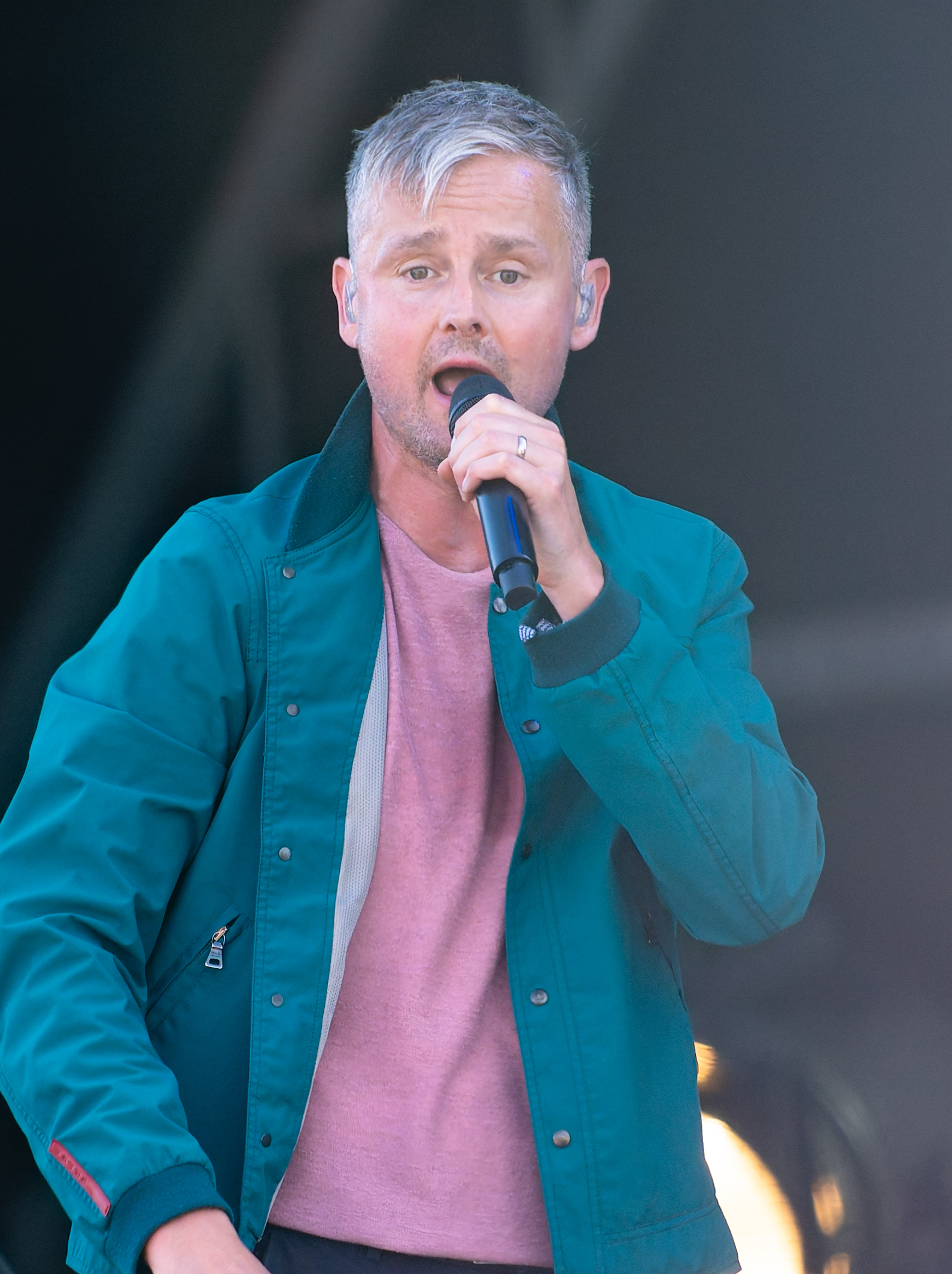
Tom Chaplin

- Beyoncé went to see Jackson in concert for the first time at age 5 and claims to have realized her sole purpose, saying "If it wasn't for Michael Jackson, I would never ever have performed."
- Celine Dion, who had posters of Jackson in her bedroom growing up, cited Jackson as a major motivation for her to learn English and fueled her desire to want to be a megastar.
- Chris Brown has claimed Michael Jackson as his biggest inspiration of all time, stating "Michael Jackson is the reason why I do music and the reason I am an entertainer [...] Being able to see Michael Jackson's success, to be able to inspire the world as well as his talent and musical ability, his eye for detail – automatically inspires me to try to be better and try to be great."
- Chris Martin of Coldplay has said Jackson was his early introduction to music through Bad and Off the Wall album, and dedicated a letter in Martins' handwriting on Coldplay's official website, "Michael Jackson was the best of the best. His music and performances made the world a brighter place. His light will shine on forever."
- Ciara explained, "Whenever someone asks me who inspires me to do what I do, I always say Michael. That's it for me. He's everything to me [...] I feel it's important for me to continue to let my generation know how important he was to music."
- Dave Keuning, lead guitarist of The Killers, says listening to "Thriller" made him love music and inspired him to become a musician. David Guetta's beginning in audio mixing was a "beat mash paying homage to Michael Jackson's "Billie Jean". Guetta names him as a primary influence. He voiced regret they had not collaborated before his passing, after his Jackson-inspired 2014 single "Bad" went number one in several countries.
- Eddie Vedder from Pearl Jam has said that listening to Jackson's music got him into singing "And my parents became the new foster parents for seven kids in this group home. They were mostly African-American kids and some Irish kids. [...] I started singing to Michael Jackson records." Eddie also notes that his first album was "Got To Be There".
- Greg Gonzalez of Cigarettes After Sex credits Jackson as his primary influence to become a musician, "Yeah for me I started young, I think I was born the year that Thriller came out and pretty much Michael Jackson became like this immediate idol, and I wanted to be a performer; just sing and perform and just seeing everything that he was doing."
- Icona Pop's initial track that made them want to make music was Black or White by Michael Jackson. "I think it was because it's such a powerful pop song. Even though I was really young when I first heard it, I really felt what it was all about. I guess at even such an early age I knew that I wanted to be making music and I can thank Michael Jackson for that."
- Iron & Wine's earliest impression of music was with his friend to "Beat It", saying "I still remember, to this day sitting on his couch" narrating their amazed reaction listening on a cassette tape.
- James Morrison explained "I was four or five and I used to watch Moonwalker every day, there was a clip of him singing "Man in the Mirror" at a concert where everyone's lighters are out and that was a massive moment in my life. Something clicked in my head, which was 'I want to do that, I want to sing.' [...] Michael Jackson was my first love singing wise."
- Janet Jackson, his sister, says he inspired her in many ways and helped her perform, recalling
  Michael and I would tape every old musical, and we made a collage. All the dance numbers, we put them all on one tape and we used to just watch them and watch them. He was Fred Astaire, i was Ginger Rogers, and we'd learn every routine. Our mirror was the reflection off the window [...] Seeing all the things that he's accomplished, and saying okay I've got to keep growing, I've got to keep pushing forward, move on, on and upward. [...] And I think he's the greatest there is.
- Jason Derulo states, "He is the reason I am who I am today. When I was four years old, I saw him for the first time. I saw how he moved the crowd and how people were just so touched."
- Jeremiah Green of Modest Mouse, said that he was a big fan of Jackson musically. When he was asked what he wanted to be as a grown up, he responded, "Well, duh, dude, I might be Michael Jackson".
- Kevin Parker of psychedelic super project Tame Impala has said of one of his earliest introductions to music,
  My brother Steve, who was a few years older than me, had Bad on tape and I remember listening to Smooth Criminal and just thinking it was the coolest thing ever. I must have been five or six at the time and I remember walking around school by myself thinking I was Michael Jackson. I wasn't dancing, exactly – more like walking musically. It seemed like a good idea at the time.
  Additionally, he says, "Michael Jackson's one of my favorite artists of my whole life [...] In fact, I think he is my favorite."
- Lenny Kravitz, "Michael Jackson, just because he was the first thing that made me want to play music. The Jackson 5 was monumental to me — in my development, in my music, in my childhood, in my adult life." He mentions seeing him in concert, "It was magical. He was six or seven years old. It was crazy. I had a picture in my bedroom that my father took of them that night on stage. It was my earliest memory of what changed my life."
- Matty Healy, frontman of The 1975, cites Jackson as his earliest musical influence, "Michael Jackson [...] The first gig I went to was Michael Jackson at Wembley when I was six. It was the HIStory tour. Watching him catalysed a real drive in me. He was such a phenomenal performer."
- Ne-Yo said in 2008, "Michael Jackson is one of the reasons why I sing." Additionally, on 2019 Larry King Live and 2024, "Without Michael Jackson, there would be no Ne-Yo." Particularly for his Libra Scale album, he referenced Jackson's need for quality was a motivation to make his music better.
- Pat Monahan from Train described that he left his basketball career behind after listening to Jackson's music in a carpool ride back home. He claims the whole car including himself was singing to a song by Jackson, until the others in the car turned to him in shock from his vocal quality. He also named Off the Wall as one of five albums he couldn't live without.
- Robin Thicke, "Michael's music was one of the first things that made me want to become an artist. When I was on the school bus at seven or eight years old I would sing Michael songs to get attention. It was one of the first times I knew that I wanted to be an artist."
- Tom Chaplin of Keane says, "[Bad] was the first album that had a huge impact, and kick-started feelings of making music myself."
- Troye Sivan credits Jackson for making performing his dream career, after seeing footage of the Bad tour on VHS tape.
- Usher has on many occasions named Jackson as his biggest influence, "I wouldn't be who I am today without Michael Jackson. [...] You can't say you are an artist in this century and wasn't inspired by Michael ... and I'm always gonna remember. I'll be a fan for life." They performed together at the Michael Jackson: 30th Anniversary Special for "You Rock My World".
- Victoria Monét was asked what made her want to be a musician, said,
  It was after watching a Michael Jackson concert on tape when I was around six or seven. He had a certain magic about him, seeing how many people were having a great time in the crowd, it was like they had no worries, they were just so overjoyed to be celebrating together in the one space. To child-me, it looked like there were millions of people in the audience, and they were so emotional – people bursting into tears, or passing out – the passion he exuded in every move. [...] So I was like, 'I wanna do that!'.
- The Weeknd referenced Michael Jackson in a Complex magazine article, he says "He's everything to me, so you're going to hear it in my music. Off the Wall was the album that inspired me to sing." Tesfaye covered "Dirty Diana" re-titled "D.D." on his third mixtape Echoes of Silence. The Weeknd also cites Jackson's falsetto on Don't Stop 'til You Get Enough helped him train his own falsetto.

=== Specific creative methods ===
Various musicians have referenced Michael Jackson for specific creative methods.

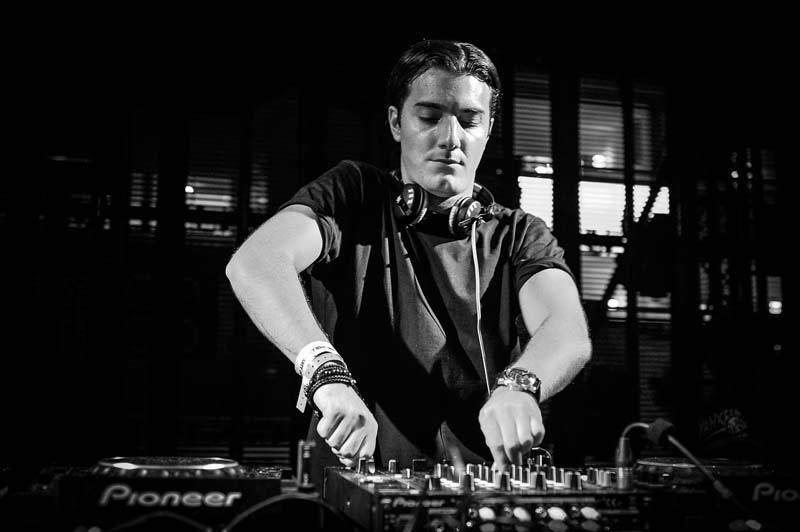
Alesso

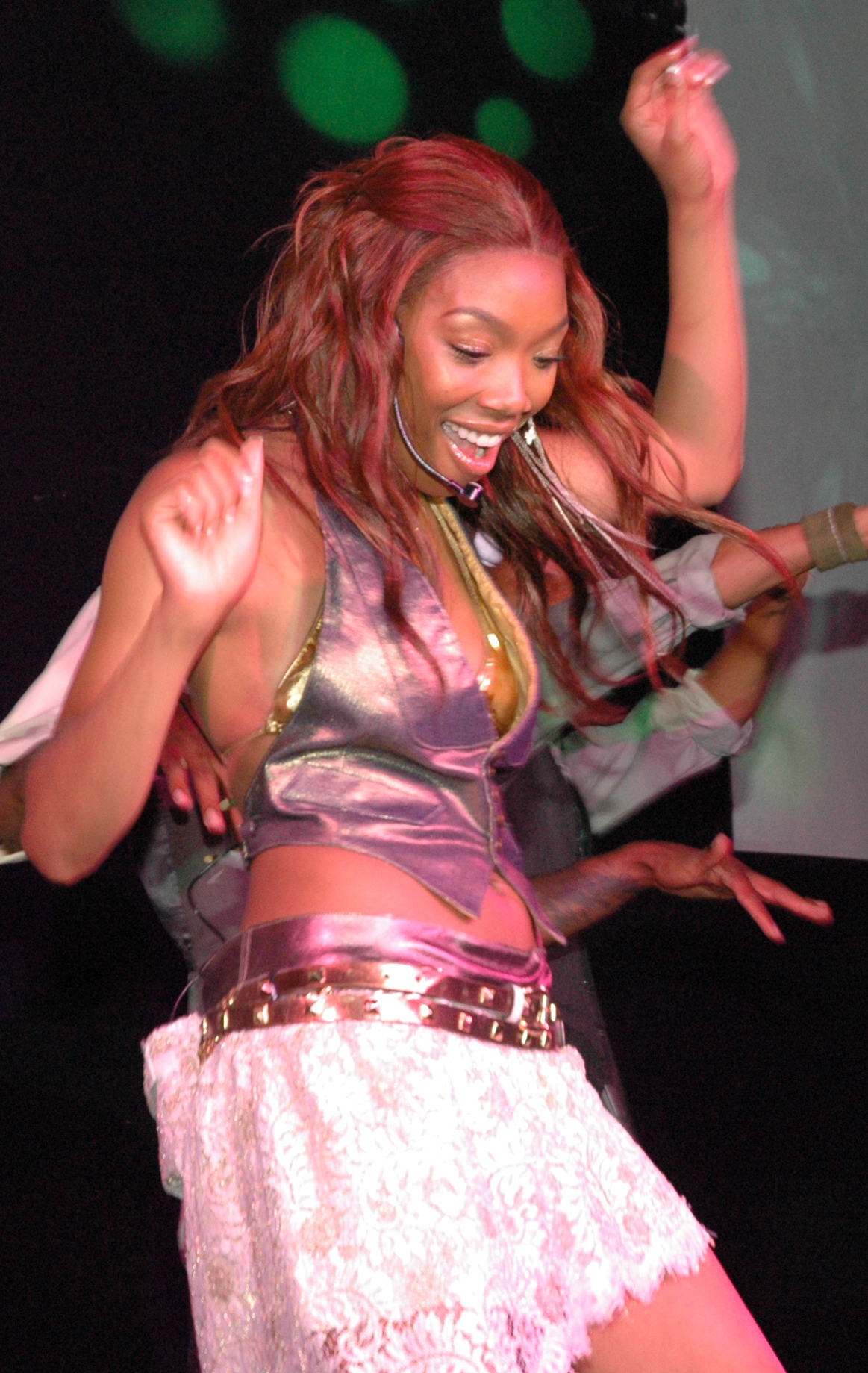
Brandy Norwood

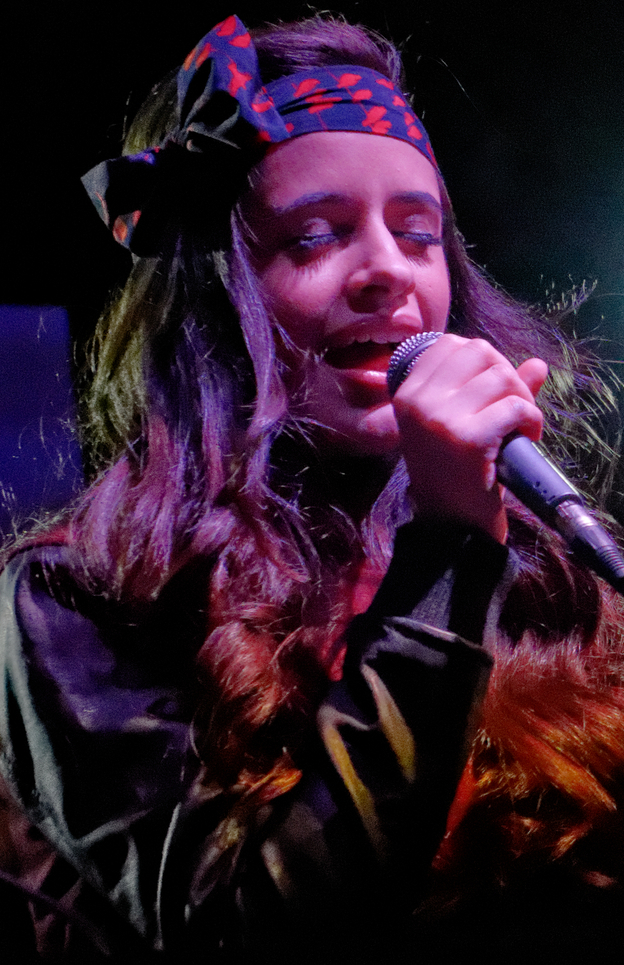
Camila Cabello

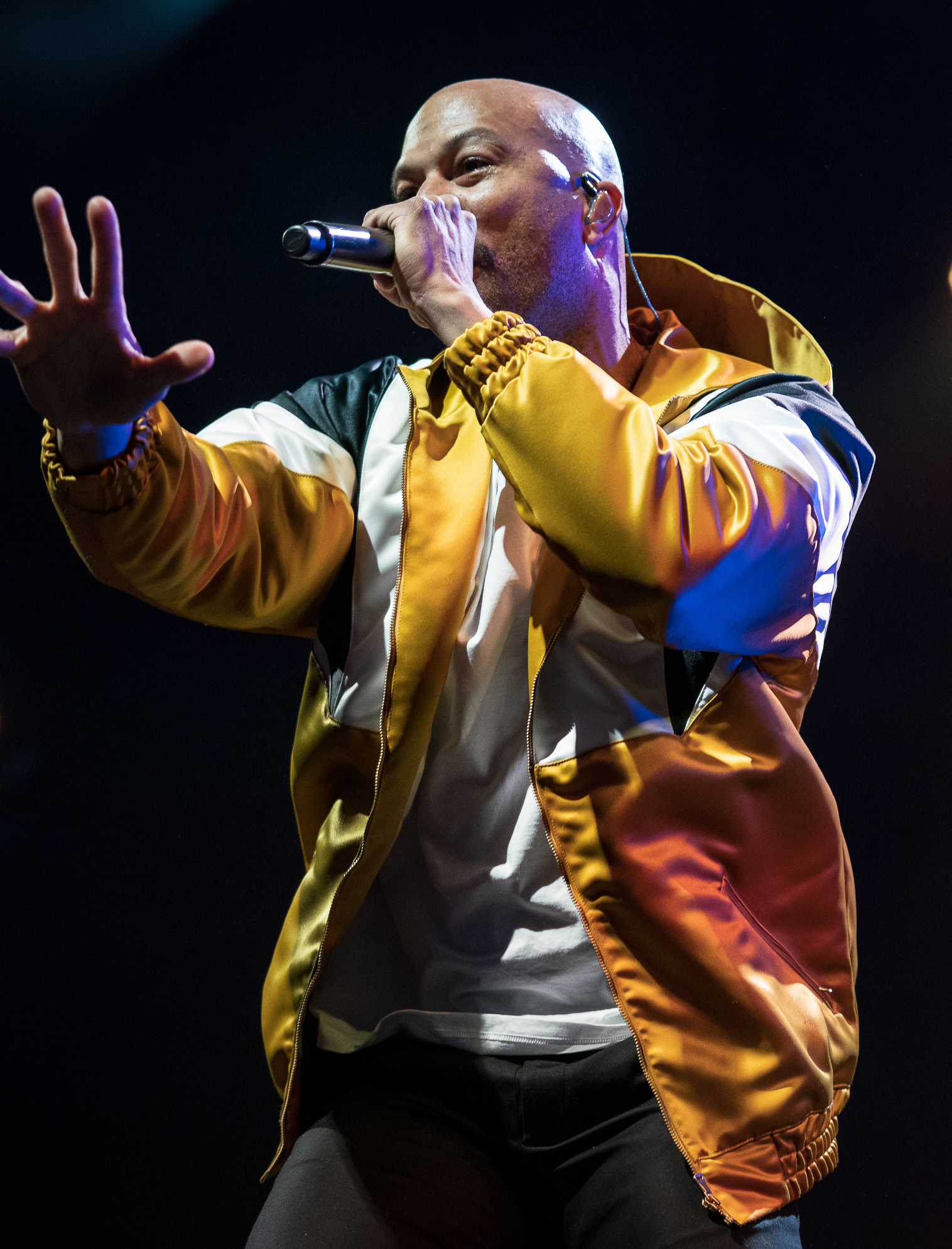
Common

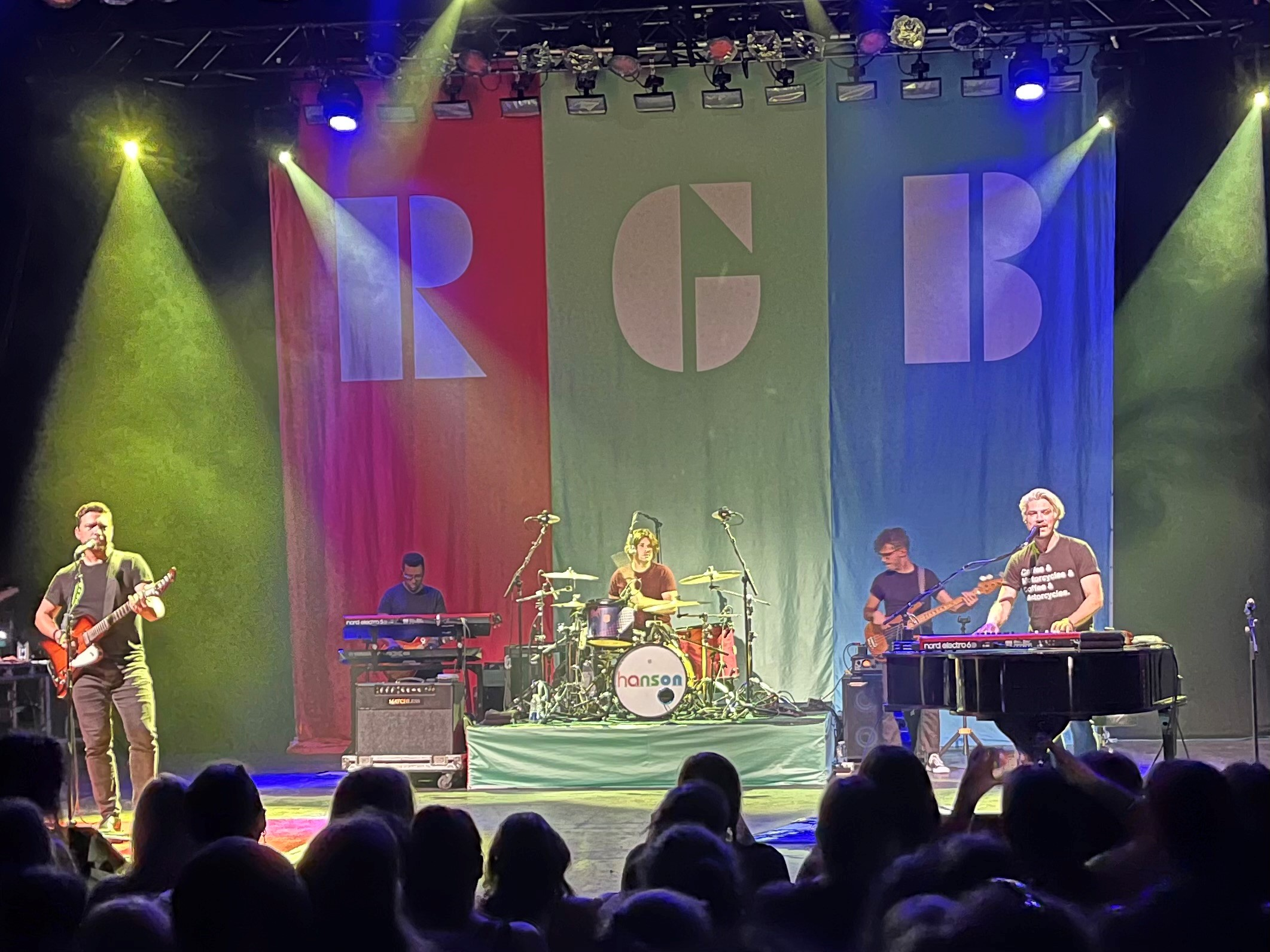
Hanson

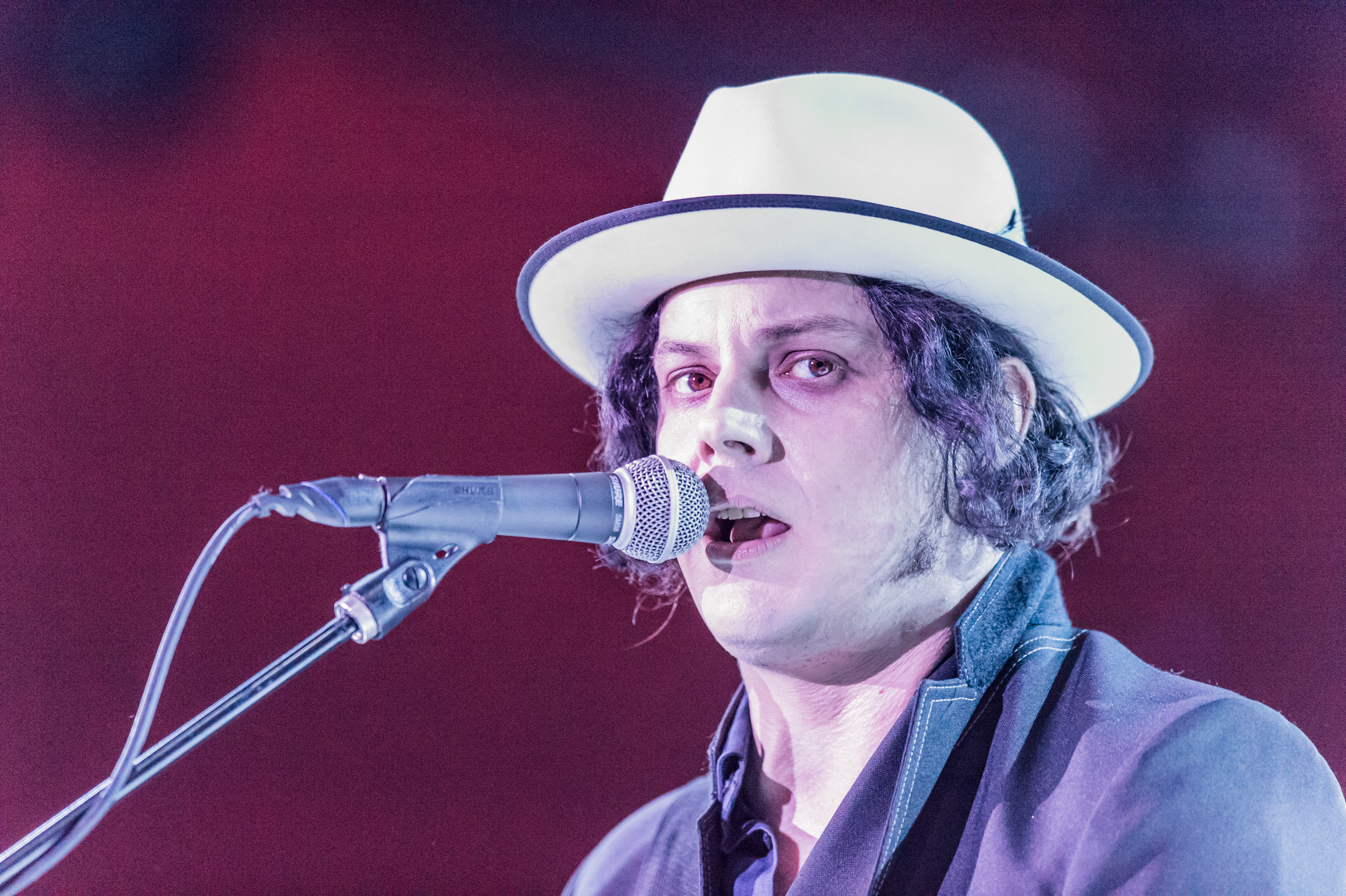
Jack White

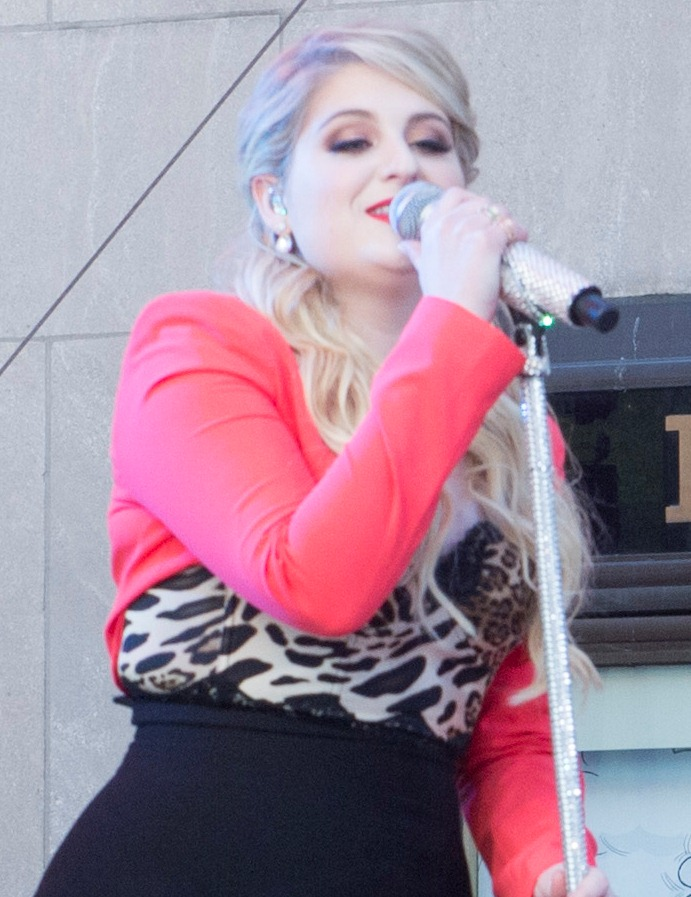
Meghan Trainor

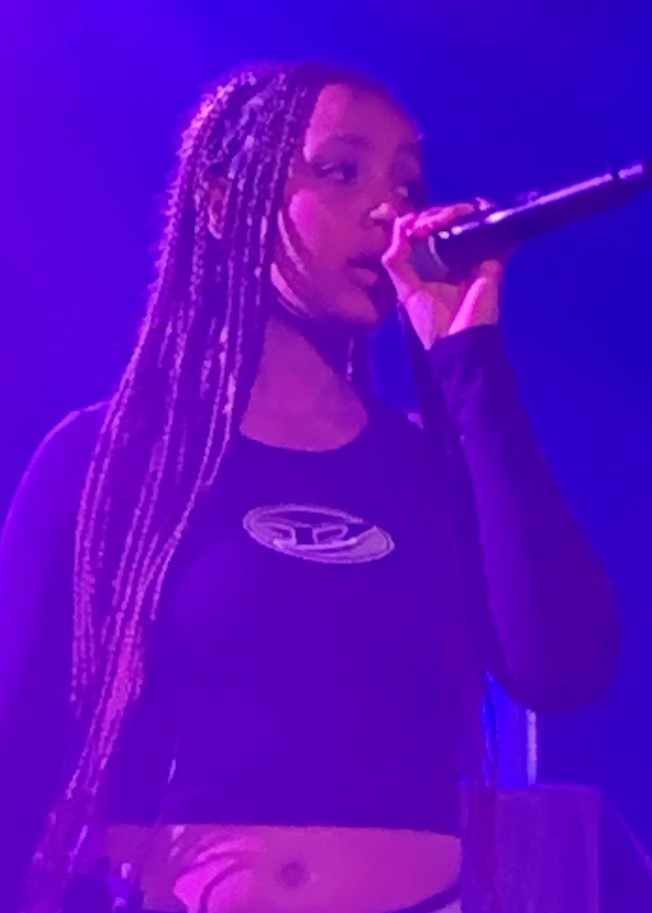
PinkPantheress

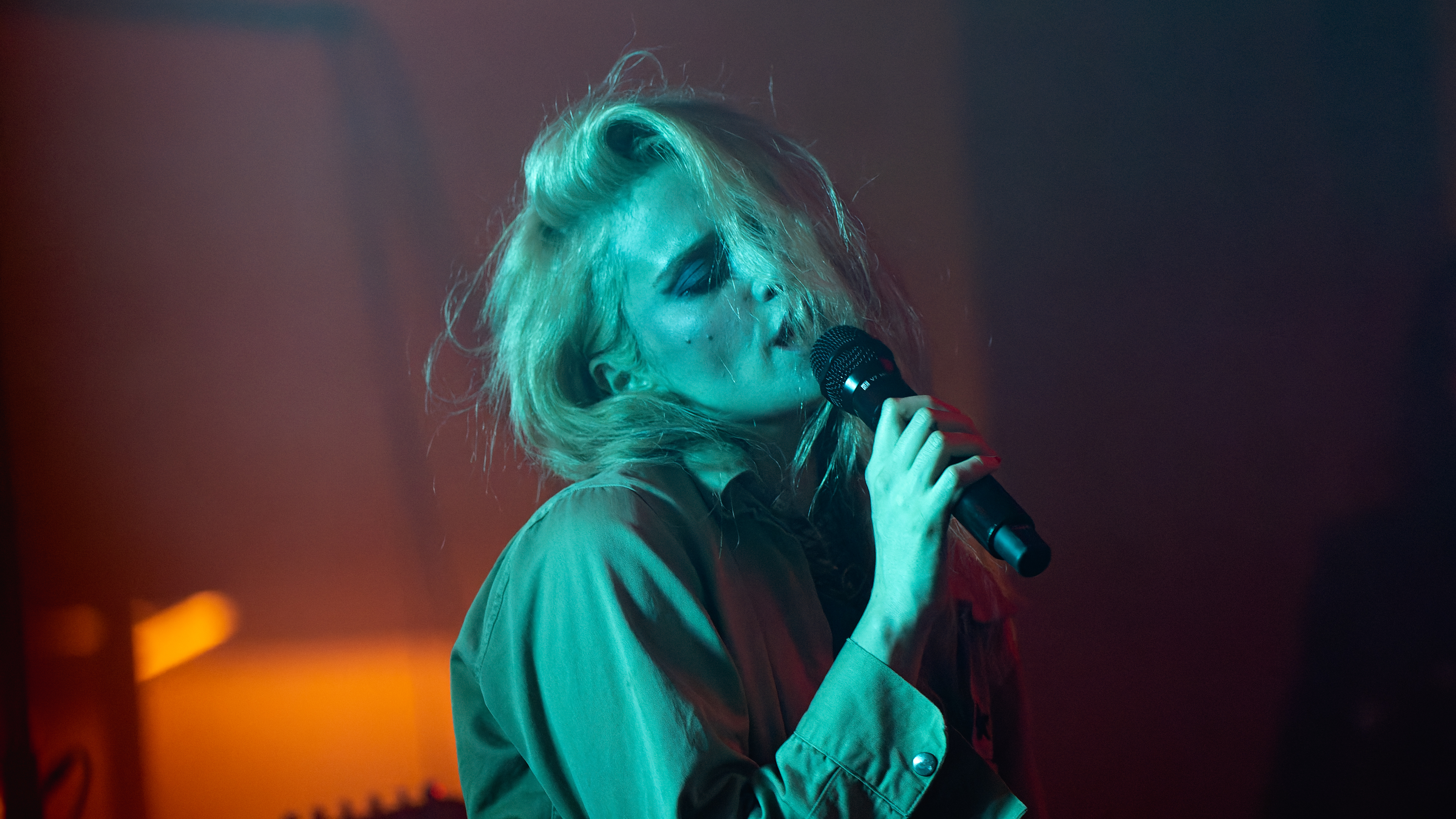
Sky Ferreira

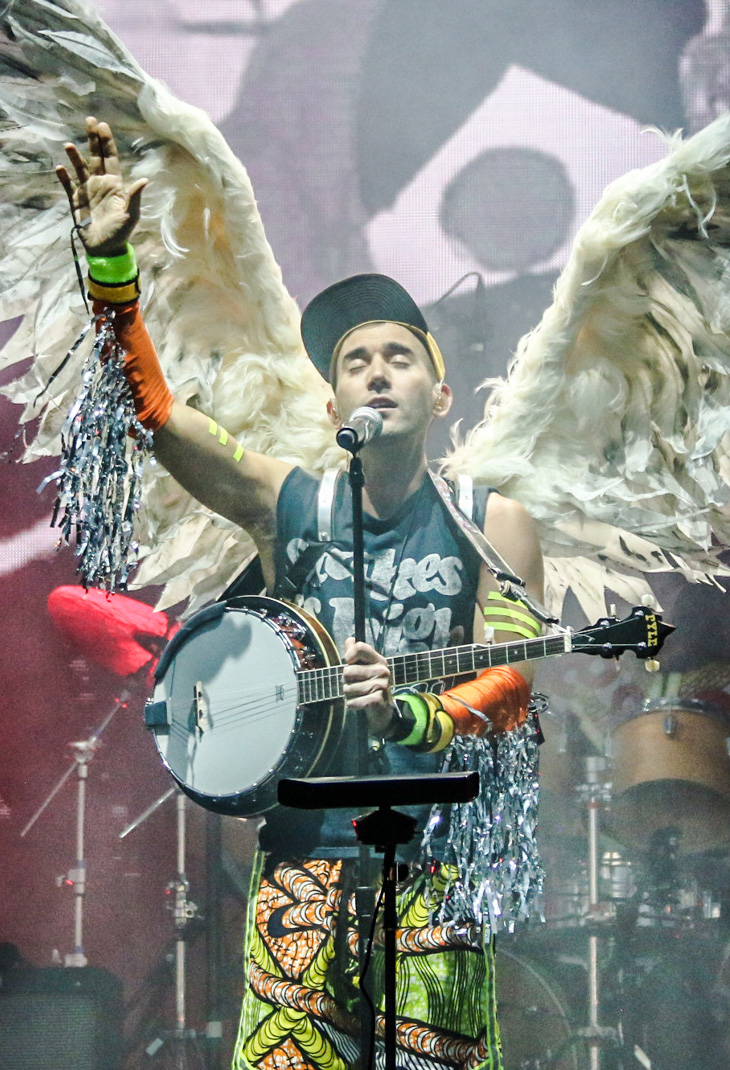
Sufjan Stevens

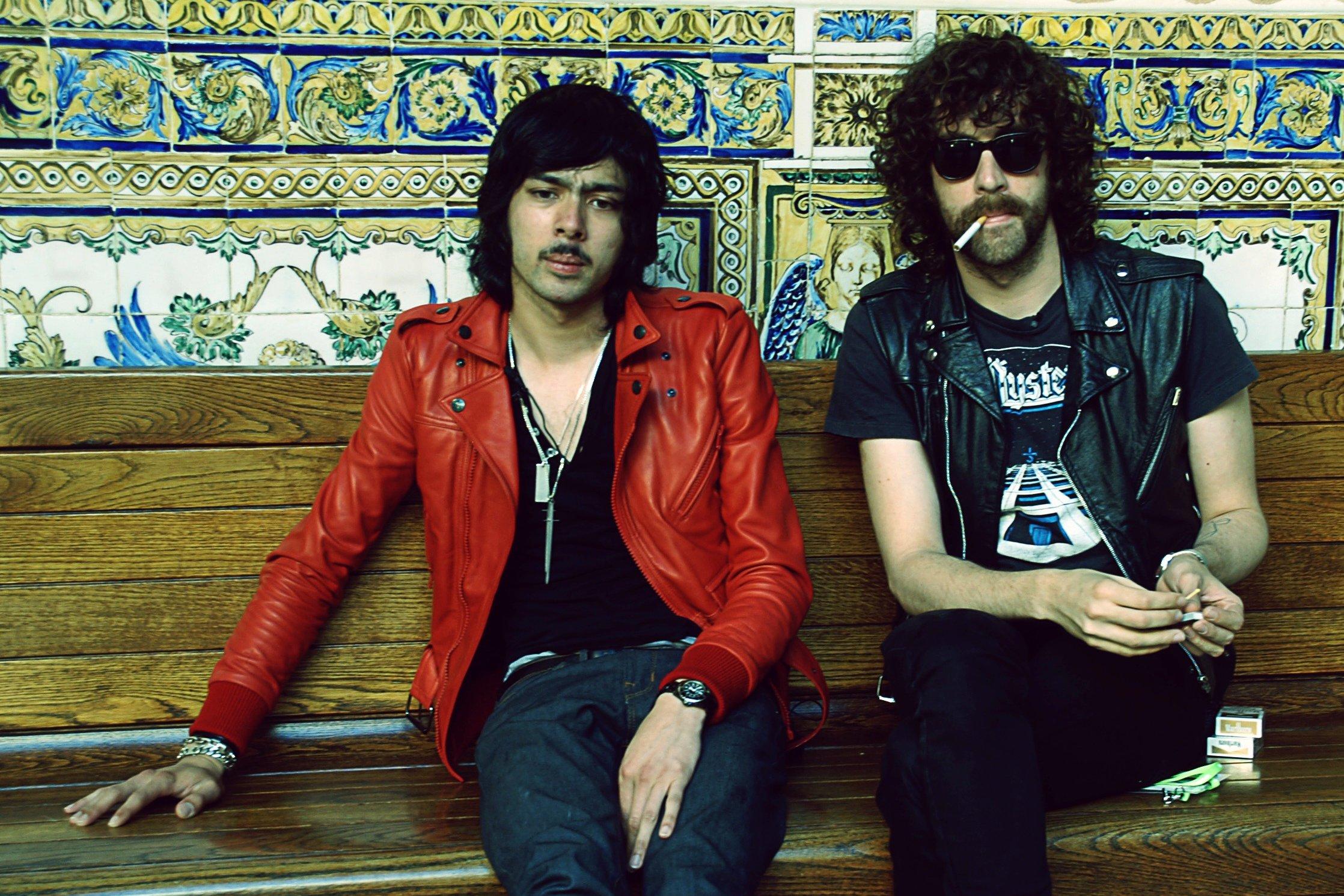
Xavier de Rosnay (left)

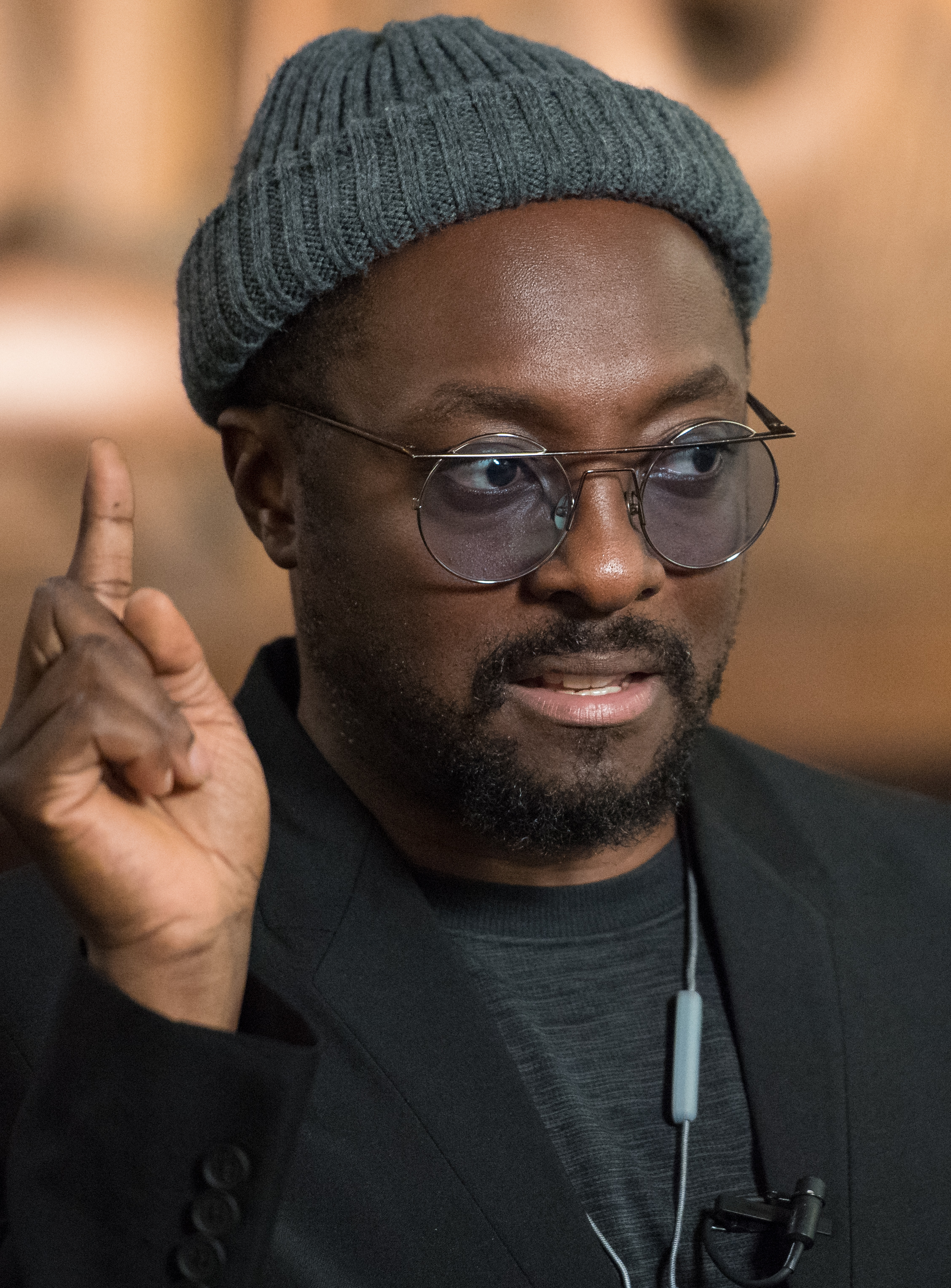
will.i.am

- Alesso described to DJ Mag that disc jockeys must constantly reinvent their music but it should still sound like them. So, he harnessed Jackson who is creatively his biggest influence, "Always evolving, always coming up with new ideas but still managed to stay himself the whole time".
- Brandy, who admires Jackson, has influenced her to stack vocals in an unconventional way for Full Moon.
- Camila Cabello credits Michael with inspiring the content of her debut album, Camila. She also explains the music video for "Thriller" inspired her to make an extended version of "Havana".
- Charlie Puth's virtual music class on sound reproduction uses Quincy Jones and Michael Jackson's vocal recording trick as a focused case study on 2-note phrasing (also tie notes) using Pro Tools.
- Clean Bandit's Jack says of him and Grace's emphasis to focus on their music videos was from Jackson, "I used to watch so much MTV 2 and VH1 Classics when I was like 15 or 14. I guess the first music video I had was the Michael Jackson Greatest Hits on VHS [...] I completely wore out that tape. Since I started working with Grace [...] we realised that she had worn out the same tape. I think Michael Jackson music videos are the pinnacle of that medium."
- Common has said watching Jackson on Motown 25 stuck with him as a performer for his energy, "I can see it now. I remember where I was; a friend videotaped it and I rewound it and watched it so many times. It was one of those moments where it was out of body in a way, because his energy was so incredible. [...] It became part of the breakdance culture at some point, too." He highlights this move motivated him to use energetic movements when he's on stage.
- Hanson, the group popular for "MMMBop", implement the term "apply the "Michael Jackson theory" during their production process to emphasize their songs must have the standard of "lots of groove and melody".
- Both members of Honne, describes that Michael Jackson is a main influence to their music, "For me, growing up I loved Michael Jackson." They borrowed 80s style drum and snare elements, like the Simmons snare that Michael Jackson used.
- Imogen Heap appeared on Thrillercast podcast in 2008, to talk in depth about Jackson's methodology,
  As a singer, the way that you would breathe, people kind of dip down their breaths, when it comes down to their vocal take, I love the way he incorporates it. The breaths are just as important as the vocal melody. [...] Michael Jackson's collection of words that don't exist in the English language or perhaps any language apart from Michael Jackson's own special dictionary. Words like shamone, I have no idea what shamone means but what's great about that is it leaves a door wide open for people like myself to also make up entirely nonsensical words and create even whole songs about them!
- Jack White of The White Stripes has praised him numerous times, "["Let God in the room"] [...] I saw Michael Jackson say that once. I thought, Wow, I've been saying that to myself for a long time, and I was glad to hear him say that. The ultimate thing to do is to relinquish all control." "And I want to write like Michael Jackson would write—instead of writing parts on the instruments or humming melodies, you think of them. To do everything in my head and to do it in silence and use only one room." He copied Jackson's melody-before-lyrics approach specifically for Boarding House Reach.
- James Bay mentioned as a child he was obsessed with Michael Jackson, attributing his trademark wide-brimmed hat was inspired by the image of Jackson's single silvery glove.
- Junior Senior's "Move Your Feet" was a song often mistaken for Jackson's voice. Junior Senior said in a 2005 The Reykjavík Grapevine interview that this wasn't the listener's imagination, it was intentional.
- Meghan Trainor listed Jackson amongst four other entertainers who inspired her,
  Just how much he was involved with every music video, every photo shoot, every production. I didn't know any of that. I've been watching recently because I'm like, 'Am I doing too much stuff?' I'm involved in every little thing you see (in my career). I looked it up because I was like, 'Am I alone?' and I was like, 'No, that's what Michael did. You're doing the right thing.
- Muse's song "Time Is Running Out" was specifically created during a studio session where the band wanted to have a sound similar to "Billie Jean".
- The Newton Brothers infused retro music of Radiohead and Michael Jackson for their composition work in the X-Men '97 soundtrack.
- Maxwell covered "The Lady in My Life" at the 2022 Billboard Music Awards. He said ever since, he wanted to make such songs like Jackson that were used at his friends weddings to walk down the aisle to, just like Lady in My Life.
- Pharrell Williams has expressed admiration for Jackson, having once said "I met Michael at his video shoot in California. I told him from the age of 6 I would burn holes in my socks moonwalking in the bathroom." Williams stated he was motivated to write songs for Jackson, though it would eventually end up on Justin Timberlake's album Justified.
- PinkPantheress created songs on GarageBand in her college dormitory. Influenced by Jackson's music style, she became a viral sensation from her Michael Jackson-remix track "Just A Waste" on TikTok in 2020. It both sampled Off the Wall and lyrically copied Wanna Be Startin' Somethin'. It never officially released due to his estate rejecting authorization but helped her land a record deal with Parlophone four months later.
- Roddy Ricch credits Michael Jackson as inspiration behind his Grammy-nominated song, "The Box," explaining on HBO's The Shop that he saw Jackson do the iconic "EE RR" adlib, "I seen Michael Jackson do it...That's what made me want to do it. Cause he was in the studio one time and he was talking about some song that he made but he started beatboxing and he said he put that in the beat."
- Sky Ferreira's grandmother was Jackson's hair stylist, and she mentions he suggested at age 9 that she join a gospel choir. She was saddened by his passing, and recalls his advice, "He was like, 'Don't focus on things that are just around you – you need to look back to the history of music.' And that's what I did."
- Sufjan Stevens expressed admiration for Michael Jackson in a 2011 interview by stating "I watched the Michael Jackson documentary This Is It [...] just the work that goes into that kind of production and how invested the dancers were and also how hands-on Michael Jackson was. [...] I realized for the first time that all of his music is based on physical ideas. They'd be working through something, and he would explain a musical gesture with his body." Jackson's techniques influenced his tour, The Age of Adz.
- Xavier de Rosnay from Justice says electro hit single D.A.N.C.E was a creative homage to Michael Jackson, "The music of Michael Jackson is something we believe in. So, we built the lyrics mainly around the titles of his songs." P.Y.T., A.B.C., Black or White, Working Day and Night and Whatever Happens are lyrics in the song.
- Composer and rapper Will.i.am for Thriller 40 documentary did a recording session breakdown of the track layering on "Beat It", "It shows the freedom and how comfortable he felt in the studio without worrying about people's judgement or like 'What's that' cause you know he was bringing freaking skill. You knew he was bringing ultra talent, and imagination for him for him to be like 'You know what I feel like yawning right here.'" In another interview, he predicts the future of "perfecting" music, "It's a peek of what's coming [...] In the future, I would bet that tomorrow's Michael Jackson is not a person. It's a machine that will be able to talk to millions of people at the same time. Tomorrow's big superstar will be able to make custom songs Michael Jackson wasn't able to record. Tomorrow's superstar is going to be perfect." He has founded the AI-powered company RAiDiO.FYI that intends to be used for radio consumption.

=== Other major influence ===
Various named him a main or major influence or have known to heavily reference him.

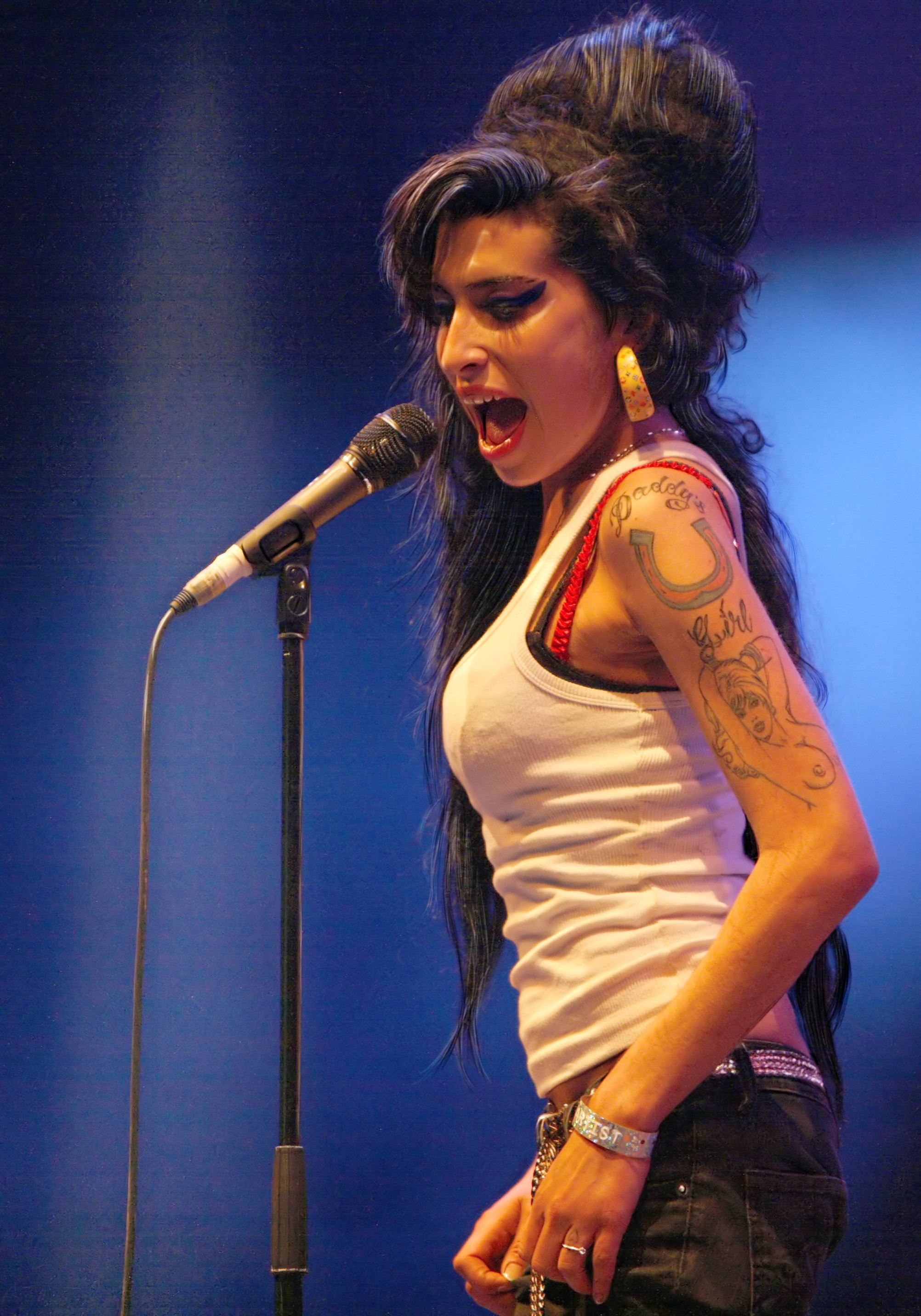
Amy Winehouse

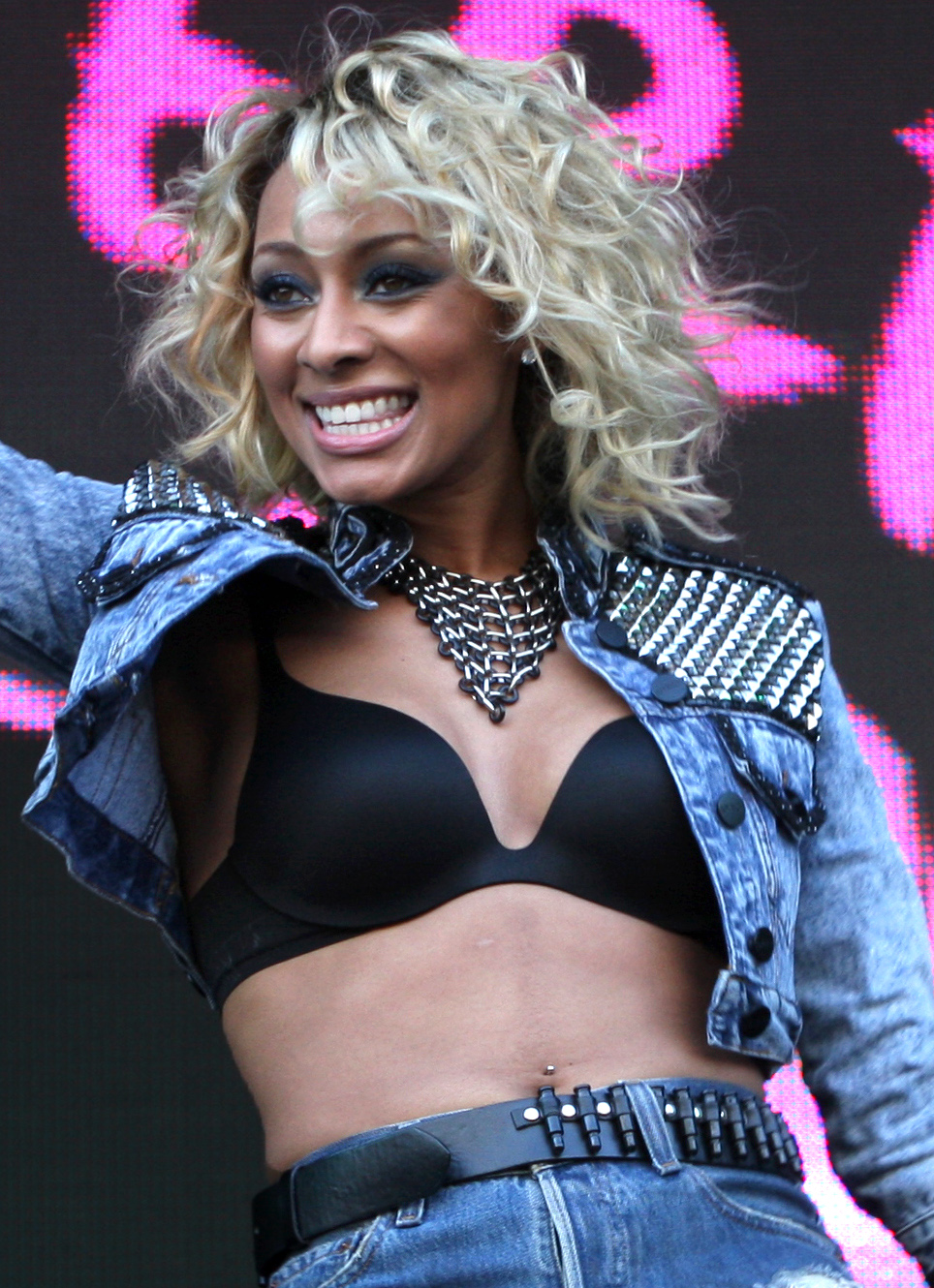
Keri Hilson

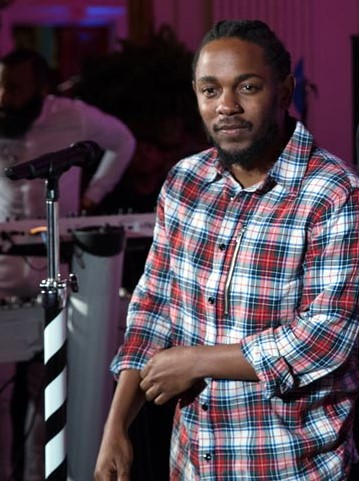
Kendrick Lamar

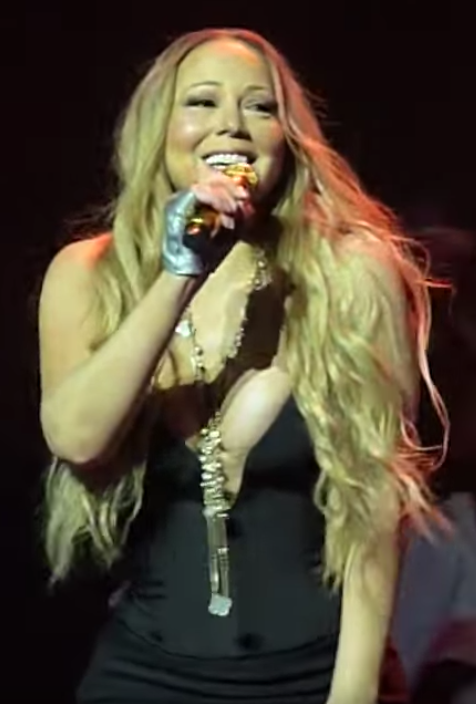
Mariah Carey

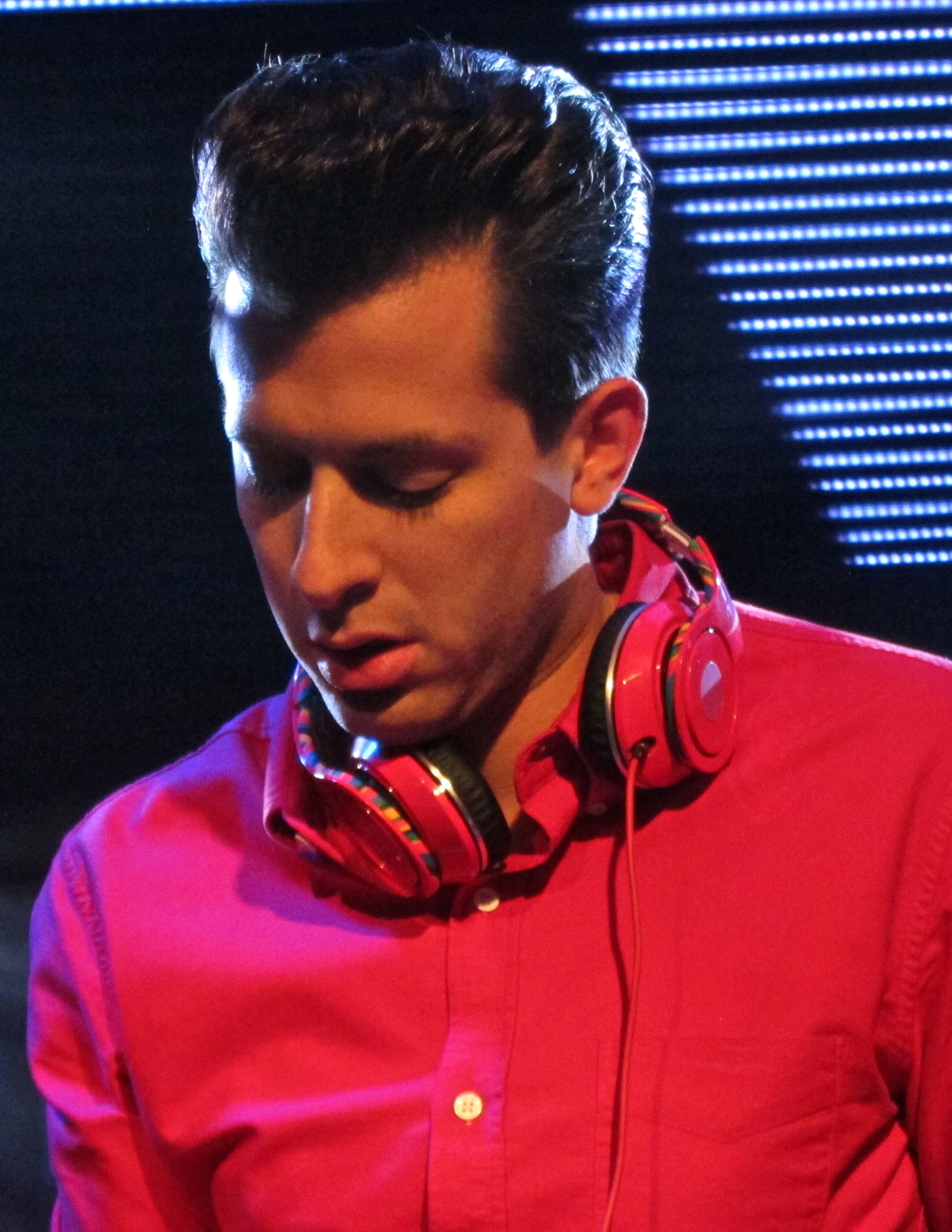
Mark Ronson

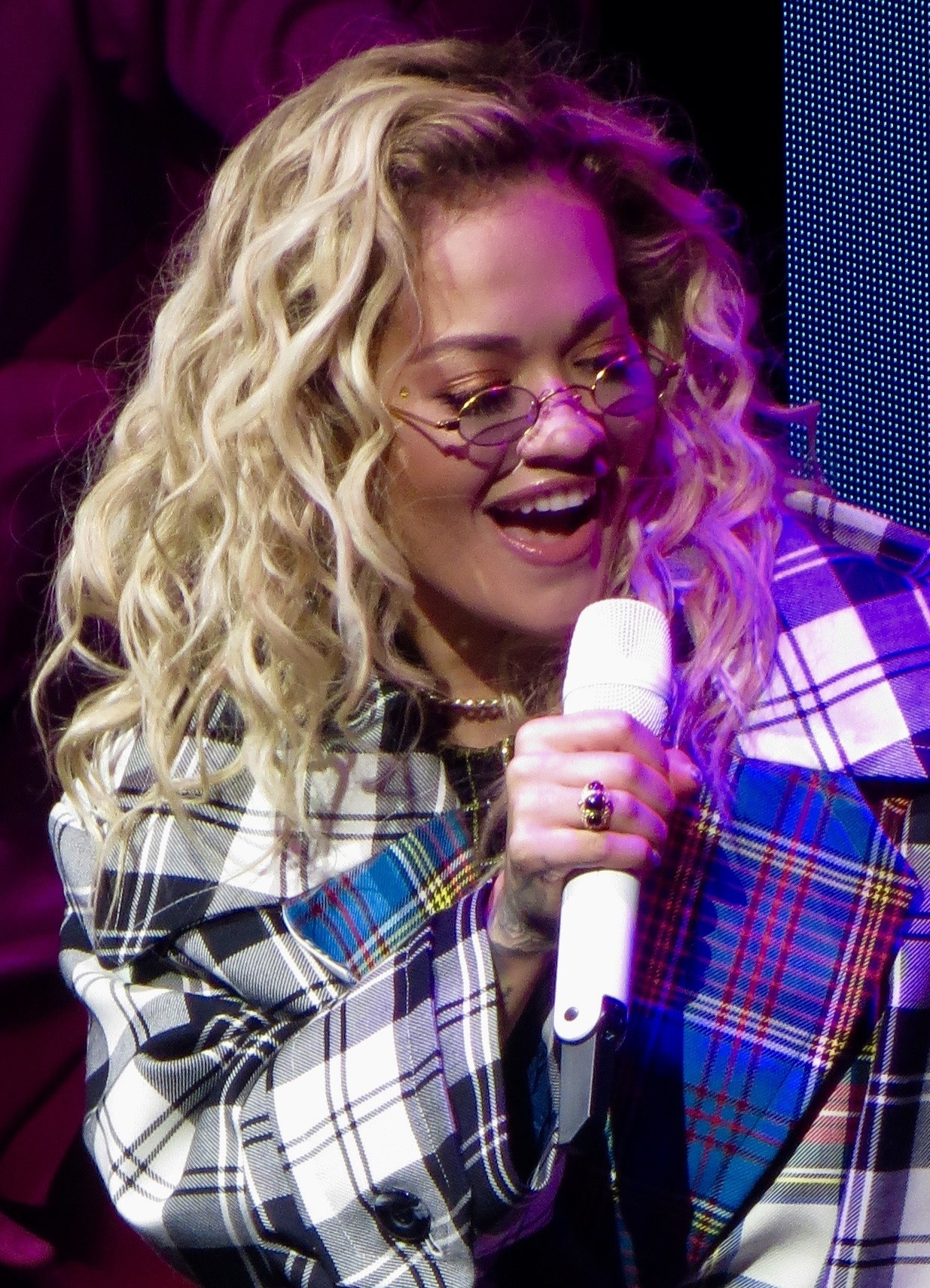
Rita Ora

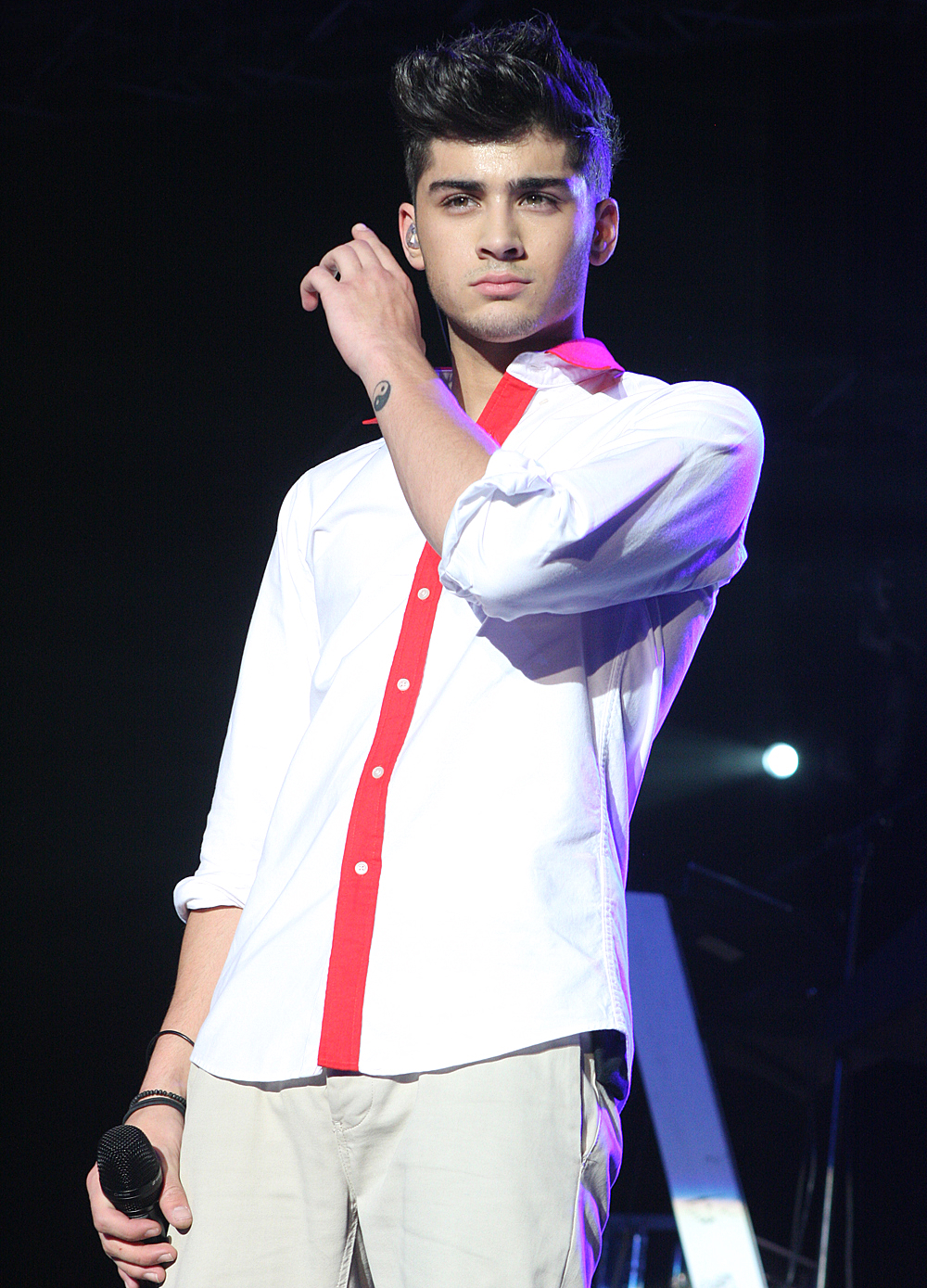
Zayn Malik

- Adam Levine of Maroon 5 contributed to a Rolling Stones column declaring that "I never met him, but he was probably the single most important musical influence for me."
- Amy Winehouse, who said in a 2004 interview, "I could never decide whether I wanted to be Michael Jackson or marry him. I don't care what people say about him now because he's a fucking genius."
- Ariana Grande's early UK screen test for Nickelodeon contained a question on who would she trade places with for one day to which she chose Michael Jackson. Her tribute to him, "ABC" she put in the description, "I have his music to inspire me."
- Billy Martin of Good Charlotte, "I've got every Michael Jackson album [...] He is one of my major musical influences."
- Bruno Mars, a long-time fan, explains Jackson set the bar for music artists for his "attention to detail [...] Any artist, I don't care what genre you do, you should always aspire to be like Michael Jackson." Mars wrote a dedication across on his social media platforms that Michael Jackson "will forever be the man that turned music into magic."
- South Korean band BTS has cited Jackson as a major influence, and the members also own various memorabilia of Jackson. Their dance cover of "Black or White" and "Love Never Felt So Good" were aired on television. Their first English single "Dynamite" is an indirect homage to Jackson's dance moves while their second English single "Butter" begins with a Smooth Criminal reference.
- Jay Kay of acid jazz band Jamiroquai mentioned Jackson in a statement, "I was hugely influenced by Off the Wall particularly. He will always be remembered for that level of brilliance which will doubtless never be replicated again."
- Kendrick Lamar is influenced by Jackson and in a CBS Morning interview says he is his dream collaboration. In an interview on The Tonight Show Starring Jimmy Fallon, he called Michael Jackson "the legend". Lamar's award-winning album To Pimp a Butterfly references Jackson twice, in "King Kunta" and "Mortal Man".
- Keri Hilson, "Michael Jackson has been an influence so much to why I love the stage. I remember particularly a performance of his song, "Dirty Diana". I was in the nosebleeds section, but I felt so much a part of his whole show. That has never happened since, never happened before that, and don't think it will ever happen again."
- Lady Gaga has named Jackson as a source of her influence, both musically and fashionably. She owns around 400 pieces from his personal collection, buying them through auction. In 2016, she wore Jackson's jacket from his 1990 visit to the White House at Hillary Clinton's final campaign rally, during the 2016 U.S. presidential election.
- Mariah Carey has mentioned Michael Jackson as one of the major influences who helped shape her artistry. When asked in an interview who her inspirations were, she said "Looking at the time I was little, Michael Jackson when he was a kid, and then when he did Motown 25 when he was there making history."
- Mark Ronson, producer of Uptown Funk, is a fan of Jackson's music, and dedicated a tribute mixtape for him called "Mark Ronson Presents Rhymefest - Man In The Mirror". In Thriller 40 documentary he says, "Michael saw that he could touch greatness with Off The Wall. Knew he was still going against racist radio and people that wanted to put him in a box. But you'd have to be in the rare .0001% to be able to project yourself to that."
- Miley Cyrus has a "Bad" font tattoo on her fingers in honor of her favorite album of Jackson, and expressed great admiration. "I wish I would have had some kind of determination to be like 'How can I get in touch with Michael Jackson and let him know how much he means to me?"
- Pete Wentz of Fall Out Boy stated, "Michael Jackson has been a part of my life for as long I have heard music. He in my mind is the ultimate entertainer of our generation. I can remember exact moments of my life based on Michael Jackson songs and videos." Fall Out Boy officially covered Jackson's music, releasing a studio version of "Beat It" on Live in Phoenix.
- Rita Ora references Jackson as her "king" and greatest inspiration: "I've always been a big fan but I didn't really understand how amazing he was until I got older. When you start to understand his music, it's like, "Whoa. What was he drinking? What was he breathing?" P.Y.T. (Pretty Young Thing) is my favourite song. He's an inspiration to me, and the whole world, because he was himself throughout his whole career. He wrote whatever he wanted to write and wore whatever he wanted to wear. I really admire anyone with that sort of confidence. You don't have to be famous; it's really admirable in anyone." On some concerts, she notes she wears Michael Jackson socks to keep up a high energy.
- Nigerian duo P-Square has named Jackson as their major music inspiration. In the late 1990s, the dancing group they belonged to majorly mimed Jackson's dance routines in Africa. The costumes for Invasion, which won Album of the Year in Africa was inspired by Jackson as well.
- Tyla in an interview for Vogue Japan on the artist who has the greatest influence on her is Michael Jackson, "He is loved by people of all ages all over the world and is an eternal presence." Zayn Malik says Michael Jackson is his greatest inspiration. Actress and singer Zendaya says Michael Jackson's lack of profanity in every song was admirable, "I've loved Michael Jackson since the minute I was born. He always had a positive way of doing what he did. He had such a love for the art of music and tried to make people feel better through that."

=== Widening the craft ===
Michael Jackson is given mention by artists to have widened particular aspects of the music industry or expanded their view on their own ability.

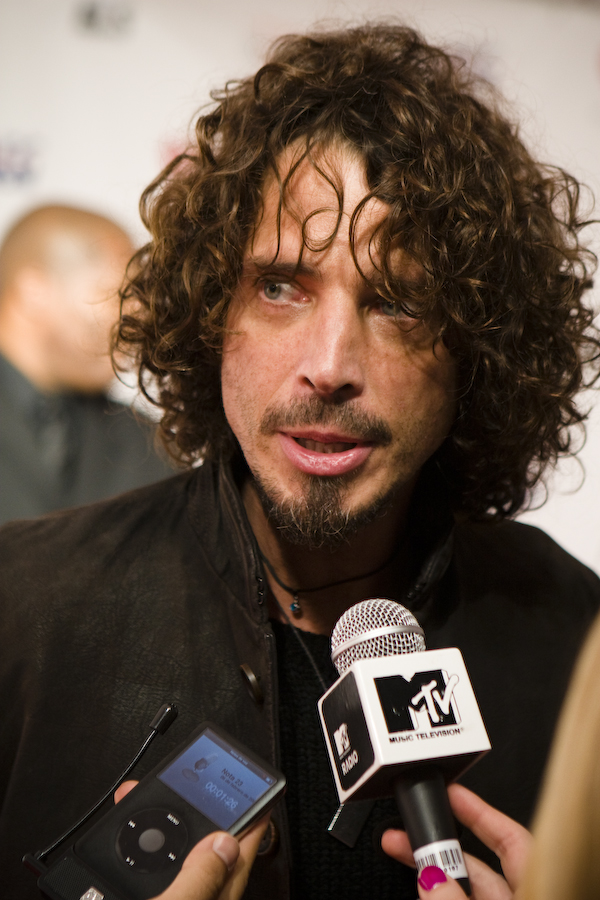
Chris Cornell

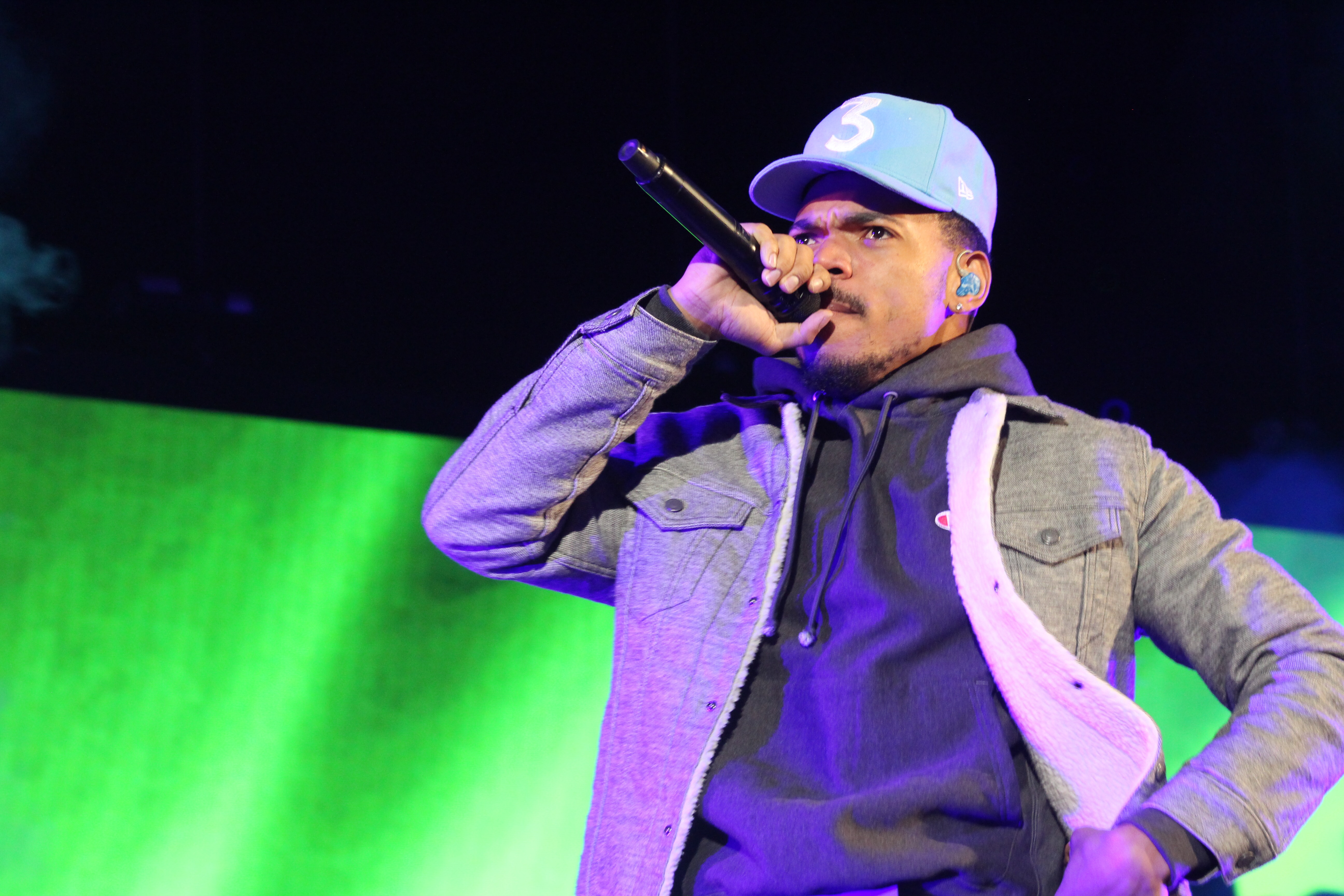
Chance the Rapper

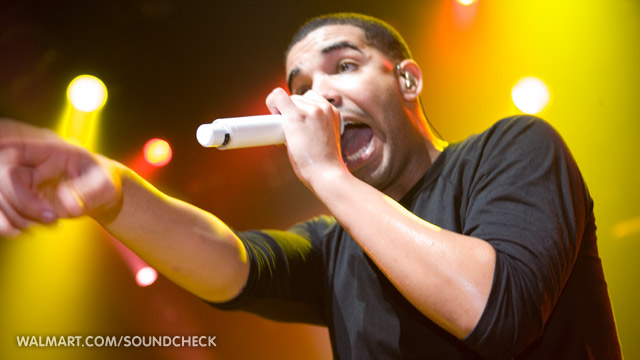
Drake

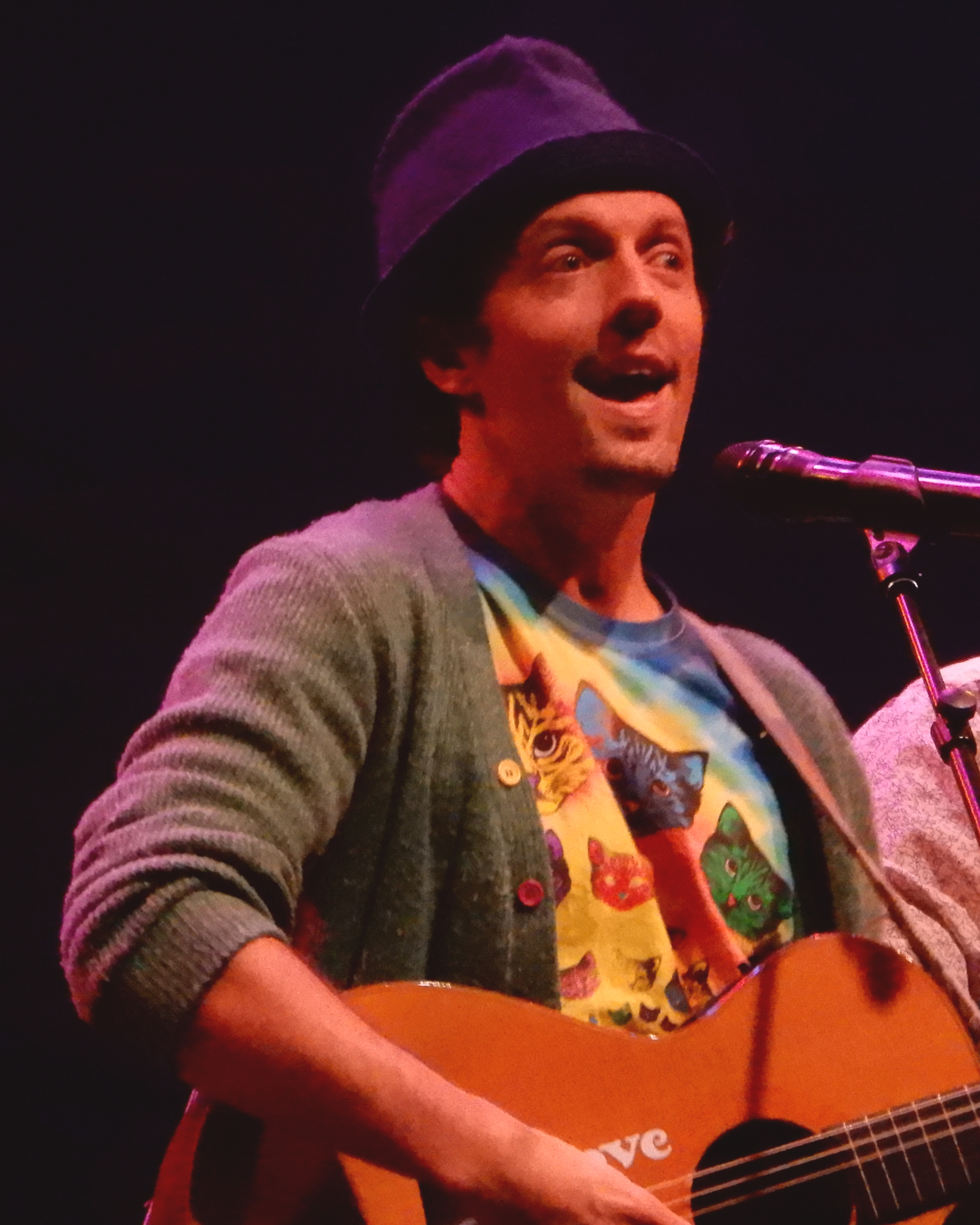
Jason Mraz

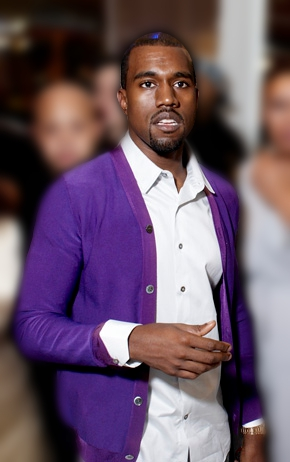
Kanye West

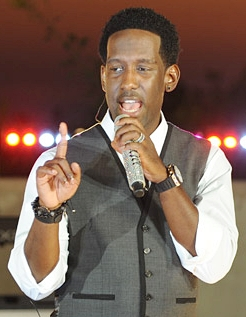
Shawn Stockman

- Chris Cornell, the singer of Soundgarden and Audioslave, "The next thing that had a clear impact was when I was already a musician, probably about 18 years old, and was working in restaurants but was also starting different bands at the time, and was obviously watching MTV all the time, just to see what was on it. I wasn't a fan of most of it. Then, "Thriller" happened, and to see that shift from pretty much an entirely white audience watching an entirely white music channel change because of this one guy [Michael Jackson]."
- Chance the Rapper did Michael Jackson impersonations at his school talent shows and exclusively only listened to him up until the fifth grade. Once becoming a musician, Michael Jackson's philanthropic side and social commentary greatly inspired him and helped shape his desire to make activism part of his artistry.
- Drake challenged the snub of "One Dance" in other categories following his 2017 Grammys Award for Best Rap Song win for Hotline Bling, "There's pop obligations that [the Recording Academy] have," he said. "And I fluked out and got one of the biggest songs of the year, that is a pop song, and I'm proud of that. I love the rap world, and I love the rap community, but I write pop songs for a reason. I want to be like Michael Jackson." Scorpion and Certified Lover Boy have featured or were inspired by Jackson posthumously.
- Jason Mraz who is known primarily for acoustic songs, says he wanted to make a dance album, "[Michael Jackson] That brilliant falsetto, the groovy songs, the harmony with his brothers. It dominated music through the 1970s and 1980s. It was how I learned to dance through his records."
- Kanye West interviewed with BBC Radio 1's Zane Lowe, "There would be no Kanye West without Michael Jackson [...] I would not be Kanye West were it not for Michael Jackson. He had to fight to get his video played because he was black." West has name dropped him in multiple songs, most controversially the line "[I am] The only rapper compared to Michael" for "I Am a God". West also credits Jackson for his inspiration to make his 2008 album 808s & Heartbreak as he mentioned that when the pair met in New York City a year prior, West had played him "Good Life" and said Jackson loved his singing voice.
- Shawn Stockman of Boyz II Men said witnessing the achievements of Jackson was a massive inspiration to the black community. On June 27, 2009 in Atlantic City, they sang a tribute to him and following a playback of Billie Jean he ranted, "I have to say something about this song. This song right here revolutionized music as we know it. Here's the bug out. MTV did not want to play (broadcast) this song. I remember that. For those that don't remember, there was a big controversy around this song. They didn't want to play it because it was R&B music." He also declared, "If there wasn't Michael Jackson, there would be no little dudes from South Philly like myself trying to emulate his moves [...] There would be no Boyz II Men."

=== Overall impact ===
Michael Jackson has also been referenced by artists as a major influence on the music industry.

- Alicia Keys gave her thoughts, "I think Michael Jackson has influenced every performer on the face of the earth. What he really inspired me to do and influenced me to do is my best, and I feel like what he represented is quality and craftsmanship with his performance."
- David Cook, winner of American Idol season 7 highlighted Jackson, "I think the impact that Michael Jackson has on me as an artists is the same impact he's really had on everyone as an artist," says Cook. "He blew pop music wide open, you know, and made it bigger than just music."
- Ed Sheeran hailed Michael Jackson as the most influential artist of the past 25 years in an interview with Q Magazine. John Mayer wrote a Time article on Jackson's influence on himself and music as a whole, "I mean, what are the '80s? A Rubik's Cube, 3-D glasses and Michael Jackson. [...] As a musician, the man was one of the purest substances ever in music. [...] They don't want to remember that that kind of greatness is achievable because it skews the bell curve completely." Katy B described, "You can have the youngest boy who wanted to be Michael Jackson learning his dance routines, and the girliest girl [also]. I just think his music can just connect with different kinds of people. [...] I just think that's amazing."
