= Nathalie Saba =

21st-century Egyptian singer

- Born: Nathalie Saba; 1998 (age 27–28); Cairo, Egypt
- Occupation: Singer
- Years active: 2011–present
- Label: Sony Music Middle East

Nathalie Saba (Arabic: ناتالي سابا; born 1998 is an Egyptian singer. Her debut song, "Snow", was written and recorded on Europa. Saba describes the song as "about not taking things at face value, when you reach a certain place in your life where you realize that not everything that's beautiful on the outside is beautiful on the inside."

== Discography ==
- 2015: Snow
- 2016: Black Birds
