= 2011 Birthday Honours =

British government recognitions

The Birthday Honours 2011 for the Commonwealth realms were announced on 11 June 2011 in the United Kingdom, New Zealand, Barbados, Grenada, Papua New Guinea, Solomon Islands, Tuvalu, Saint Lucia, Antigua and Barbuda, and on 13 June 2011 in Australia to celebrate the occasion of the Queen's Official Birthday for 2011.

The recipients of honours are displayed or referred to as they were styled before their new honour and arranged first by country, honour and where appropriate by rank (Knight Grand Cross, Knight Commander etc.) then division (Military, Civil, Overseas or Police list).

== United Kingdom ==
=== Privy Counsellors ===
- Thomas Anthony Brake, MP, Liberal Democrat Member of Parliament for Carshalton and Wallington.
- The Hon. Nicholas Soames, MP, Conservative Member of Parliament for Mid Sussex.
- Desmond Angus Swayne, TD, MP, Conservative Member of Parliament for New Forest West, and Parliamentary Private Secretary to the Prime Minister.
- Sir Peter Hannay Bailey Tapsell, MP, Conservative Member of Parliament for Louth and Horncastle, and Father of the House of Commons.

=== Member of the Order of the Companions of Honour (CH) ===
- The Rt Hon. The Lord Howard of Lympne, former Leader of the Conservative Party and Cabinet minister

=== Knights Bachelor ===
- Professor Roger Michael Boyle, CBE, National Clinical Director for Heart Disease and Stroke. For services to Medicine.
- Dr Henry Burns, Chief Medical Officer for Scotland, Scottish Government.
- Henry Cecil, Trainer. For services to Horse Racing.
- Frank Chapman, Chief executive, BG Group. For services to the Oil and Gas Industries.
- Professor Robert Geoffrey Edwards, CBE, Scientist, Reproductive Biology. For services to Human Reproductive Biology.
- Bruce Joseph Forsyth-Johnson, CBE, For services to Entertainment and to Charity.
- Professor Peter John Gregson, President and Vice-Chancellor, Queen's University Belfast. For services to Higher Education.
- Anthony Gerard Hawkhead, CBE Chief Executive, Groundwork. For services to Environmental Regeneration.
- David Hartmann Higgins, lately Chief Executive, Olympic Delivery Authority. For services to Regeneration.
- Councillor Edward Julian Lister, Leader, Wandsworth Council. For services to Local Government.
- (Joseph) Alan Meale, MP. For public and political services.
- John Wilfred Peace Chairman, Standard Chartered Bank. For services to Business and to the Voluntary Sector.
- Dr Hugh Reginald Brentnall Pelham, Director, Laboratory of Molecular Biology, Medical Research Council. For services to Science.
- Peter Austin Simpson, OBE, Executive Principal, Brooke Weston Partnership Northamptonshire. For services to Education.
- Professor Steven Murray Smith, Vice-Chancellor, University of Exeter and President, Universities UK. For services to local and national Higher Education.
- Brian Souter, Chief Executive, Stagecoach Group plc. For services to Transport and to the Voluntary Sector.
- Graham Robert Watson, MEP. For public and political services.
- Professor Mark Edward Welland, Chief Scientific Adviser, Ministry of Defence.
- Paul Michael Williams, OBE, OStJ, DL, Lately Director-General, Health and Social Services, Welsh Assembly Government and chief executive, NHS Wales.
- Christopher Anthony Woodhead, Chairman, Cognita Schools and Professor of Education, University of Buckingham. For services to Education.
- Professor Kent Linton Woods, Chief Executive, Medicines and Healthcare products Regulatory Agency. For services to Healthcare.

Diplomatic Service and Overseas List

- Dr. George William Buckley, Chairman, President and Chief Executive Officer, 3M Company. For services to industry.

=== The Most Honourable Order of the Bath ===
==== Knight Grand Cross of The Order of the Bath (GCB) ====
Civil Division

Sir Augustine Thomas O'Donnell, KCB, Cabinet Secretary and head of the Home Civil Service

==== Knight Commander of The Order of the Bath (KCB) ====
Civil Division

- David Robert Bell, Permanent Under-Secretary, Department of Education
- Malcolm Roy Jack, Clerk of the House of Commons
- Michael Graham Pownall, Clerk of the Parliaments 2007–11

Military Division
Army

- Lieutenant General Barnabas William Benjamin White-Spunner, C.B.E., late The Blues and Royals (Royal Horse Guards and 1st Dragoons), 501534.

==== Companion of The Order of the Bath (CB) ====
Civil Division

- David John Mark Green, QC
- Richard Nicholas Heaton
- Peter Houten
- Dr Hugh Fenton Rawlings
- Dr Gill Rider
- Dr Frances Carolyn Saunders

Military Division
Royal Navy

- Rear Admiral Mark Anderson, C023620N.
- Vice Admiral Robert George Cooling, C027243B.

Army

- Lieutenant General Andrew John Noble Graham CBE, late The Argyll and Sutherland Highlanders, 500820.
- Major General Robert Adam Mungo Simpson Melvin, OBE, late Corps of Royal Engineers, 499747.
- Major General Martin John Rutledge, OBE, late 9th/12th Royal Lancers, 495453.

Royal Air Force

- Air Vice-Marshal Simon John Bollom, Royal Air Force.
- Air Vice-Marshal Graham Edward Stacey, M.B.E., Royal Air Force.

=== The Most Distinguished Order of Saint Michael and Saint George ===
==== Knight Grand Cross of The Order of Saint Michael and Saint George (GCMG) ====
Diplomatic Service and Overseas List

- Sir Nigel Elton Sheinwald, K.C.M.G., H.M. Ambassador, United States of America.

==== Dame Commander of The Order of Saint Michael and Saint George (DCMG) ====
Diplomatic Service and Overseas List

- Dr Nicola Mary Brewer, C.M.G., H.M. Ambassador, South Africa.

==== Knight Commander of The Order of Saint Michael and Saint George (KCMG) ====
Diplomatic Service and Overseas List

- Dr John Jenkins, CMG LVO, lately H.M. Ambassador, Iraq.
- Professor Jeffrey Lionel Jowell, Q.C., lately member, Venice Commission, Council of Europe. For services to human rights, democracy and the rule of law in Europe.

==== Companion of The Order of Saint Michael and Saint George (CMG) ====
Diplomatic Service and Overseas List

- David Charles Mount-Stephen Harley, lately deputy secretary general, European Parliament. For services to international diplomacy and UK/European Parliament relations.
- Professor Newell Walter Johnson, Professor of Dental Research, Griffith University, Queensland, Australia, and emeritus professor of Oral Health, King’s College, London. For services to oral medicine and to public health internationally.
- Richard Edward Makepeace, lately H.M. Consul-General, Jerusalem.
- Stephan Roman, regional director, British Council.
- David Norman Teague, counsellor, Foreign and Commonwealth Office.
- Gordon Geoffrey Wetherell, Governor, Turks and Caicos Islands.
- Ms Barbara Janet Woodward, O.B.E., director, UK Border Agency.
- Stephen John Wordsworth, L.V.O., lately H.M. Ambassador, Serbia.
- Alex Younger, Counsellor, Foreign and Commonwealth Office.

=== Royal Victorian Order ===
==== Knight Commander of The Royal Victorian Order (KCVO) ====
- The Right Honourable Christopher Geidt, C.V.O., O.B.E., Private Secretary to The Queen.
- Sir Paul Douglas Nicholson, Lord-Lieutenant of County Durham.
- John Hamilton Scott, Lord-Lieutenant of Shetland.
- Air Vice-Marshal David Walker, O.B.E., M.V.O., Master of the Household.

==== Commander of The Royal Victorian Order (CVO) ====
- Stephen Marius Gray. For personal financial services.
- Trevor James Hemmings, vice-president, The Princess Royal Trust for Carers.
- Jonathan Spencer, LVO, deputy comptroller, Lord Chamberlain’s Office.
- Nigel Victor Turnbull, chairman, Royal Household Audit Committee.
- Allan Robert Willett, CMG, Lord-Lieutenant of Kent.
- Thomas Woodcock, LVO DL FSA, Garter Principal King of Arms and Genealogist of the Most Honourable Order of the Bath.

==== Lieutenant of The Royal Victorian Order (LVO) ====
- Mrs Robin Jo Boles, chief executive, In Kind Direct
- Jonathan Roger Jones, head master, St George's School, Windsor Castle
- Desmond Philip Shawe-Taylor, Surveyor of The Queen's Pictures, Royal Collection
- Inspector Andrew Wallace Thomlinson, MVO, Metropolitan Police. For services to Royalty Protection
- Richard David Thompson, MVO, palace foreman, Buckingham Palace

==== Member of The Royal Victorian Order (MVO) ====
- Pauline Elizabeth, Mrs. Adams, formerly Clerk to the Lieutenancy, West Lothian.
- Caroline Mary, Mrs. Breckell, assistant to the Clerk to the Lieutenancy, Surrey.
- Dominic George Andrew Brown, photographer, Royal Collection.
- David James Clark, head gamekeeper, Sandringham Estate.
- Alexander Rowland Norton George, deputy land agent, Sandringham Estate.
- Miss Rachel Ann Jane Gordon, R.V.M., assistant housekeeper, Windsor Castle.
- William Allan Henderson, R.V.M., page to The Duke of Edinburgh.
- John Keohane, B.E.M., Chief Yeoman Warder, H.M. Tower of London.
- Miss Susan Jane Lewis, senior personnel manager, Royal Household.
- Roger Harold Lynn, landing site officer, The Queen's Helicopter Flight.
- Major William George LeathamMacKinlay, Equerry to The Prince of Wales.
- Ellen Elizabeth, Mrs. MacLennan, woodlands accounts clerk, Liskeard Office, Duchy of Cornwall.
- Rosemary Ann Teresa, Mrs. Doyle-Morier, formerly adviser, Royal and Vice-regal Protocol, Government House, Ottawa.
- Lorraine, Mrs. Riley, Clerk to the Lieutenancy, Hampshire.
- Robin Derek de Palatiano Howard (Willie) Hartley
- Russell, chairman, Donnington Hospital Trust.
- David Alexander Scrimgeour, R.V.M., head keeper, Delnadamph, Balmoral Estate.
- Chief Superintendent Desmond Christopher Stout, Metropolitan Police. For services to Royalty Protection.
- Christine Anne, Mrs. Taylor, visitor manager, Windsor Castle.
- Miss Susan Elizabeth Theobald, personal assistant to the Principal Private Secretary to The Prince of Wales and The Duchess of Cornwall.
- Miss Marion Sarah Cubitt Seely White, assistant to the Crown Equerry, Royal Mews.

Honorary Member

- Monty Roberts. For services to Her Majesty’s Racing Establishment (To be dated 8 June 2011.).

=== The Most Excellent Order of the British Empire ===
==== Knight Grand Cross of the Order of the British Empire (GBE) ====
- Professor Mervyn King, Governor of the Bank of England

==== Dame Commander of The Order of the British Empire (DBE) ====
- Helen Anne Alexander, CBE. President, Confederation of British Industry. For services to Business.
- The Rt Hon. Elish Angiolini, QC, lately Lord Advocate. For services to the Administration of Justice in Scotland.
- Ruth Carnall, CBE, Chief Executive, London Strategic Health Authority. For services to the NHS.
- Professor Rosemary Jean Cramp, CBE, Emeritus Research Professor of Archaeology, Durham University. For services to Scholarship.
- Dr Reena Keeble, Headteacher, Cannon Lane First School, London Borough of Harrow. For services to local and national Education.
- Professor Sarah Jane Macintyre, CBE, Professor, Social and Public Health Science, University of Glasgow. For services to Science.
- Jennifer Susan Murray, OBE, Presenter, Woman’s Hour, BBC. For services to Radio Broadcasting.
- Janet Suzman, Actor. For services to Drama.

==== Commander of The Order of the British Empire (CBE) ====
- Edward Atkin. For services to Industry and to charity through the Atkin Foundation.
- Ms Rosie Auld, Head Orthoptist, Birmingham and Midland Eye Centre and Honorary Chair, British and Irish Orthoptic Society. For services to Healthcare.
- Ms Gillian Ayres, OBE. For services to art.
- Alan James Baxter. For services to Engineering and to Conservation.
- Miss Catherine Billingham, Project Director, Health Led Parenting and First Years of Life, Department of Health.
- Ms Celia Birtwell, for services to the Fashion Industry.
- William James Brawn, Consultant Cardiothoracic Surgeon, Birmingham Children’s Hospital. For services to Medicine.
- Dr. John Robert Brown, Chairman, Roslin Foundation. For services to Science.
- Professor John Brownlie, Emeritus Professor of Veterinary Pathology, Royal Veterinary College. For services to Science.
- Ms Catherine Felicity Byrne, Deputy Director, Office for Security and Counter-Terrorism, Home Office.
- Dr. Margaret Jennifer Murray Carpenter, Consultant in Public Health Medicine, Department of Health.
- Christopher Richard Nigel Clark, Non-Executive chairman, Urenco. For services to Industry.
- Alan Clarke, Chief Executive, One North East. For services to Regeneration.
- Elizabeth Anne, Mrs. Cockram. For services to the Voluntary Sector.
- Mark Davies, Director, Health Inequalities and Partnership, Department of Health.
- Professor William Davies, Director, Centre for Sustainable Agriculture, Lancaster University. For services to Science.
- Dr. Melvyn Stuart Draper, lately Head, Non-Proliferation, Department of Energy and Climate Change.
- Ms Jenny Edwards, Chief Executive, Homeless Link. For services to Disadvantaged People.
- Professor Peter Elias, Professor of Employment Research, University of Warwick. For services to Social Science.
- Professor Peter Anthony Farndon, Director, National Genetics Education and Development Centre and Consultant Clinical Geneticist, Birmingham. For service to Medicine.
- Bryan Ferry, Singer and Songwriter. For services to music.
- Colin Firth, Actor. For services to drama.
- Professor Brian George Gazzard, Professor of HIV Medicine and Clinical Research Director for HIV/ GUM, Chelsea and Westminster Hospital NHS Foundation Trust, London. For services to Medicine.
- Dr. Christopher Shaw Gibson-Smith, Chairman, London Stock Exchange. For services to Business.
- Michael Grandage, Artistic Director, Donmar Warehouse. For services to drama
- Dr. Paul Golby, Chief Executive Officer, E.ON UK. For services to the Energy Industry.
- Stanley James Goudie, lately Chief Inspector, Education and Training Inspectorate, Department of Education, Northern Ireland Executive.
- Joseph Greenwell, Chairman, Ford of Britain. For services to the Automotive Industry.
- Professor Gisli Hannes Gudjonsson. For services to clinical psychology.
- Miss Serena Mary Sara Hardy, Director, Personal Tax Benefits and Credits and Corporate Services, Solicitor’s Office, London, H.M. Revenue and Customs.
- Terence Malcolm Hill, Chairman, Arup Group Trusts. For services to Civil Engineering.
- Professor Christopher Cropper Hood, Gladstone Professor of Government, University of Oxford and Fellow, All Souls College. For services to Social Science.
- Dr. Michael Gilbert James William Howse, O.B.E., Senior Consultant, Rolls-Royce plc. For services to Engineering.
- Trevor William Huddleston, Director, Strategy Directorate, Department for Work and Pensions.
- Mark Huffam, Producer. For services to the Film and Television Industries.
- Penny, Mrs. Hughes, President, Advertising Association. For services to the Media Industry.
- Robert Humm, Director, Litigation, Solicitor’s Office, H.M. Revenue and Customs, London.
- David Isaac, Chairman, Stonewall. For services to Equality and Diversity.
- Charles William Jacob, M.B.E. For charitable services.
- Peter John James, lately Principal, London Academy of Music and Dramatic Art. For services to the Arts.
- Professor Wendy Rosalind James, Emeritus Professor of Social Anthropology, University of Oxford. For services to Scholarship.
- Dianne Michele, Mrs. Jeffrey, D.L. For public service.
- Professor Merfyn Jones, lately Vice-Chancellor, Bangor University. For services to Higher Education in Wales.
- Professor Paul William Jowitt, Professor of Civil Engineering Systems, Heriot Watt University and President, Institution of Civil Engineers. For services to Technology.
- Richard Charles Kemp, vice chairman, Local Government Association. For public service.
- Ms Judith Ann Killick, Executive Director, Judicial Studies College, Ministry of Justice.
- Justin Matthew King, Chief Executive, J. Sainsbury plc. For services to the Retail Industry.
- Her Honour Frances Margaret Kirkham. For services to the Legal Profession and to the Administration of Justice.
- John Knight, J.P. For services to People with Disabilities.
- Dr. Judith Mary Knott, Director, CT International, and Anti-Avoidance, H.M. Revenue and Customs.
- Deborah, Mrs. Lavin, Principal, Isle of Wight College. For services to Further Education.
- Dr. Gillian Catherine Leng, Chief Operating Officer, NHS Evidence and Deputy Chief Executive, National Institute for Health and Clinical Excellence. For services to the NHS.
- Dr. Julian Lob-Levyt. For services to Global Health.
- David Lionel Mayhew, Chairman, J. P. Morgan Cazenove. For services to the Financial Services Industry.
- John McDonough, Chief Executive, Carillion plc. For services to the Construction Industry.
- Ms Kathryn McDowell, D.L., Managing Director, London Symphony Orchestra. For services to Music.
- Anthony James McGuirk, Q.F.S.M., Chief Fire Officer, Merseyside Fire and Rescue Service. For services to Local Government.
- Isobel, Mrs. Mills, lately Deputy Director, People and Communities, Government Office for Yorkshire and the Humber, Department for Communities and Local Government.
- Christopher Thomas Morahan, Director. For services to drama.
- Alexander (Sandy) Robert Nairne, Director, National Portrait Gallery. For services to the arts.
- Peter William Neyroud, Q.P.M., Chief Constable and Chief Executive Officer, National Policing Improvement Agency. For services to the Police.
- Professor Jan Pahl. For services to Social Science.
- Christopher William Parfitt, Chairman and Chief Executive Officer, General Motors UK Ltd. For services to the Automotive Industry.
- Mayur Parsuram Patel, Team Leader, Litigation, Treasury Solicitor’s Department.
- Jack Petchey, O.B.E., Founder, Jack Petchey Foundation for Young People. For charitable services.
- Margaret Louise (Maggy), Mrs. Pigott, lately Executive Director, Judicial Studies Board, Ministry of Justice.
- Ian Michael Pryce, Principal, Bedford College. For services to Further Education.
- James Hiljamar Rene Quinault, Head, Defence, Diplomacy and Intelligence Team, H.M. Treasury.
- Mary, Mrs. Quinn, Head of the Child Maintenance and Enforcement Division, Department for Social Development, Northern Ireland Executive.
- Dr. Martin Peter Read. For services to the Public Sector and to Business.
- Dr. James Stark Rennie, lately Dean of Postgraduate Dental Education. For services to Dentistry.
- Richard Noel Roberts, O.B.E. For services to Optometry.
- Barbara, Mrs. Rogers, Headteacher, St. Patrick’s Roman Catholic High School and Arts College, Salford. For services to local and national Education.
- Peter Lloyd Rogers, Group Chief Executive, Babcock International Group plc. For services to the Defence Industry.
- Ms Joanna Lesley Simons, Chief Executive, Oxfordshire County Council. For services to Local Government.
- Dr. Judith Simpson, Head of Parliament and Constitution Division, Cabinet Office.
- Dr. Justin Davis-Smith. For services to the Voluntary Sector.
- Patricia Beatrice, Mrs. Sowter, Principal, Cuckoo Hall Academy, London Borough of Enfield. For services to local and national Education.
- Mark Howard Stephens. For services to the Legal Profession and to the Arts.
- Andrew Charles Stott, lately Director, Transparency and Digital Engagement, Cabinet Office.
- Professor Yasir Suleiman, Professor of Modern Arabic Studies, King’s College, University of Cambridge. For services to scholarship.
- Professor Elaine Thomas, Vice-Chancellor, University for the Creative Arts. For services to Higher Education.
- Professor Jennifer Anne Thomas, Professor of Particle Physics, University College London. For services to Science.
- Dr Simon John Thurley, Chief Executive, English Heritage. For services to conservation.
- Antony Ronald Wadsworth. For services to the Music Industry.
- Victor Noel Stanley Wakeling. For services to Sports Broadcasting.
- Philip Anthony Waller, Senior District Judge, Family Division. For services to the Administration of Justice.
- Edward Maurice Watkins, Chairman, Charitable Fundraising Board, Central Manchester University Hospitals NHS Foundation Trust. For charitable services.
- David Way, Deputy Chief Executive, National Apprenticeship Service, Department for Business, Innovation and Skills.
- Gavin Whitefield, Chief Executive, North Lanarkshire Council. For services to Local Government.
- Professor Geoffrey James Whitty, lately Director, Institute of Education, University of London. For services to Teacher Education.
- Professor Brian Owen Williams, lately President, Royal College of Physicians and Surgeons of Glasgow. For services to Medicine.
- Alan Thorpe Richard Wood, Director of Children’s Services, London Borough of Hackney. For services to Education and to Local Government.
- William Thompson Wright, O.B.E. For services to the Bus industry in Northern Ireland.

==== Officers (OBE) – partial list ====
- Peter James Ainscough. For public service.
- Dr. Nathaniel Warren Alcock. For voluntary service to Vernacular Architecture.
- John Uzoma Ekwugha Amaechi. For services to Sport and to the Voluntary Sector.
- Dr. Jennifer Amery, Chief Professional Officer, Human Development (Health and Education), Department for International Development.
- Paul Anderson. For services to Special Olympics Great Britain.
- Ms Modupe Debbie Ariyo, Founder and Executive Director, Africans Unite Against Child Abuse. For services to Children and Families.
- Jean, Mrs. Ashton, Area Business Manager, London, Crown Prosecution Service.
- Ms Jane Ashworth, Chief Executive, StreetGames. For services to Community Sport.
- Ms Linda Austin, lately Headteacher, Swanlea School, London Borough of Tower Hamlets. For services to Education.
- Professor Jonathan Geoffrey Ayres, Professor of Respiratory and Environmental Medicine, University of Birmingham. For services to Science.
- Professor Gillian Wright Macbeth Baird, Consultant Paediatrician, Guy’s and St.Thomas’ NHS Foundation Trust, London. For services to Medicine.
- Caroline, Mrs. Bannerman, lately Principal and Chief Executive, Bolton College. For services to Further Education.
- Michael Baptist, Managing Director, Communication and Integrated Systems, Ultra Electronics. For services to the Defence Industry.
- Rosemary Susan, Mrs. Barnes, lately Chief Executive Officer, Cystic Fibrosis Trust. For services to Healthcare.
- Gerard Francis Claude Basset, Sommelier. For services to the Hospitality Industry.
- Dr. Peter Batchelor, Head of Electronics and Photonics, Department for Business, Innovation and Skills.
- David Bateson, Headteacher, Ash Field School and Assistive Technology Assessment Centre, Leicester. For services to Special Educational Needs.
- Geoffrey Anthony Baxter, Founder, Reflex Charity. For services to Youth Justice.
- Geraldine Marion (Jodi), Mrs. Berg. For public service.
- Dr. Kim Bevan. For services to Disabled Children and their Families.
- John David Bewick, Director of Strategic Development, South West Strategic Health Authority. For services to the NHS.
- Lewis Biggs, Chief Executive and Artistic Director, Liverpool Biennial. For services to the Arts in the North West.
- Margaret Fraser, Mrs. Biondi, Area Implementation Manager, Child Support Agency, Department for Work and Pensions.
- Alison Margaret, Mrs. Blackburn, Chair, Board of Governors, Harper Adams University College. For voluntary service to Land-Based Higher Education.
- Simon Anthony Blake. For services to the Voluntary Sector and to Young People.
- Dr. John William Bond, Scientific Support Manager, Northamptonshire Police. For services to Forensic Science and to the Police.
- Robert Booth, Executive Director, Land and Environmental Services, Glasgow City Council. For services to Local Government.
- Richard Henry Boyd, D.L. For services to the community in Essex.
- Dr. Stephen Brain, Grade B2, Ministry of Defence.
- Helen, Mrs. Braithwaite, Resilience Manager, Government Office for the West Midlands, Department for Communities and Local Government.
- Ms Helen Brand, Chief Executive, Association of Chartered Certified Accountants. For services to the Accountancy Profession.
- Tim Brooke-Taylor, Actor and Writer. For services to Light Entertainment.
- Keith Brooker. For services to Vocational and Technical Education and Training.
- Rosalind Jane, Mrs. Brown, Chief Executive Officer, South Yorkshire Probation Trust. For public service.
- Sheelagh, Mrs. Brown, lately Headteacher, Warminster Kingdown School, Wiltshire and National Challenge Adviser. For services to Education.
- Angela, Mrs. Burridge, Headteacher, Brentry Primary School, Bristol. For services to Education.
- Professor Noreen Burrows, Jean Monnet Professor of European Law, University of Glasgow. For services to Scholarship and to Human Rights.
- Professor Anthony Kim Burton. For services to Occupational Healthcare.
- Professor Alexander Messent Cairncross. For services to Environmental Health Overseas.
- Janette Elizabeth (Jan), Mrs. Campbell, Founder and Chair of Trustees, Personal, Social and Health Education (PSHE) Association. For services to Education.
- Elizabeth, Mrs. Cavan, lately Chair, UK Chartered Society of Physiotherapy. For services to Healthcare in Northern Ireland.
- Rodney Chambers, Leader, Medway Council. For services to Local Government.
- Ms Allison Chin, Headteacher, Swinnow Primary School, Leeds. For services to Education.
- Dr. Sophie Churchill, Chief Executive, National Forest Company. For services to the Environment.
- Lee Vincent Coates. For services to Ethical Business and Finance.
- Dr. Jane Mary Cocking, Humanitarian Director, Oxfam. For services to the Voluntary Sector.
- The Honourable Anna Gwenllian Somers Cocks. For services to the Arts.
- Guy Collyer. For public service.
- Jess Conrad. For charitable services.
- Kasmin, Mrs. Cooney, Managing Director, Righttrack Consultancy Ltd. For services to Training and to Exports.
- Dr. Barbara Elizabeth Crawford, President, Society of Antiquaries of Scotland. For services to History and Archaeology.
- Bernard Cribbins, Actor. For services to Drama.
- Ms Joanna Gabrielle da Silva. For services to Engineering and to Humanitarian Relief.
- Professor Richard Charles Darton, Professor of Engineering Science, University of Oxford and President, European Federation of Chemical Engineering. For services to Engineering.
- Maldwyn William Davies, lately Chairman, General Teaching Council for Wales and Headteacher, Willows High School, Cardiff. For services to Education.
- Gerald Vincent Irwin Davis, Chair of Corporation, College of North West London. For voluntary service to Further Education.
- Professor Richard John Davis, Professor of Astrophysics, Jodrell Bank Centre for Astrophysics, University of Manchester. For services to Science.
- Ian Dawson, Liaison Magistrate Pakistan, Crown Prosecution Service.
- Ms Beverley De-Gale, Co-Founder, African Caribbean Leukaemia Trust. For services to Healthcare.
- Edmund De Waal, Ceramic Artist. For services to Art.
- Brigadier William Ian Cotter Dobbie, General-Secretary, Council of Voluntary Welfare Workers. For services to the Armed Forces.
- Paul Colin Docker, Head of Electoral Administration, Cabinet Office.
- Christopher Dodson, Chairman, Mortimer Group. For services to Industry.
- Susan, Mrs. Donnelly, J.P., Service Security Manager, Corporate IT, Department for Work and Pensions.
- Timothy James Down, lately Deputy Director, Sector Skills, Department for Business, Innovation and Skills.
- Professor Susan Mary Downe, Director of Research in Childbirth and Health Unit and Professor of Midwifery Studies, University of Central Lancashire. For services to Midwifery.
- Frank Duffield, Q.F.S.M., Chief Fire Officer, Humberside Fire and Rescue Service. For services to Local Government.
- Ms Lee Eggleston. For services to Issues Affecting Women.
- Ms Lyn Evelyn Ewing. For services to Community Housing in Glasgow.
- Andrew Nicholas Farrar, Head of Exchequer Losses, Benefits and Credits, Preston, H.M. Revenue and Customs.
- Gary Farrow. For services to the Music Industry and to Charity.
- Richard Favier, Head of Insolvency and Restructuring, Pension Protection Fund. For services to Business.
- William Stephen Ferris, Chief Executive, Chatham Historic Dockyard Trust. For services to Heritage.
- Dr. Deborah Jane Fish, Grade B1, Ministry of Defence.
- Roy Robert David Fleming. For public service.
- Andrew Flower, Director, England National Cricket Team. For services to Sport.
- Richard Shaun Flynn, lately Detective Sergeant, Metropolitan Police Service. For services to the Police.
- Ms Emma Freud. For charitable services through Comic Relief.
- Paul Gantley, lately National Implementation Manager, Mental Capacity Act. For services to Social Care.
- David Graeme Garden, Actor and Writer. For services to Light Entertainment.
- Dr. Sunirmal (Biku) Ghosh, Founder, Gwent-Southern Ethiopia Health Link. For services to Medicine.
- Neil Gillespie, Director of Design, Reiach and Hall Architects. For services to Architecture.
- Edward James Godfrey. For services to Mental Healthcare in the South West.
- Michael Godfrey, Chief Engineer, Honda, Swindon. For services to the Automotive Industry.
- David Roderick Goodman, Justices’ Clerk and Director of Legal Services for Staffordshire, H.M. Courts Service, Ministry of Justice.
- Lieutenant Colonel Conrad St. John Graham, T.D., D.L. For voluntary service to SSAFA Forces Help in London.
- Ms Deborah Griffin. For services to Women’s Rugby.
- Jane, Mrs. Guy, lately Training Manager, Citizens’ Advice Bureau. For services to the community in Plymouth.
- Feizal Hajat, Head of Community Safety Legal Services, Birmingham City Council. For services to Local Government.
- Dr. Paul Hann, lately Grade 6, New Academies Division, Department for Education.
- Dr. Berenice Margaret (Beri) Hare, Principal, Stroud College, Gloucestershire. For services to Further Education.
- Ms Judy Hargadon, Chief Executive, School Food Trust. For services to Children’s Well-being.
- Charles William Victor Harris, Director of Youth Projects, Rank Foundation. For services to Young People.
- Robert Brinley Joseph Harris, Radio Presenter. For services to Music Broadcasting.
- James Patrick Howard Harrison, Grade B1, Ministry of Defence.
- Andy Hawthorne, Founder and Chief Executive, Message Trust. For services to Young People in Greater Manchester.
- Kevin Henry, lately Chair of Governors, Croydon College. For voluntary service to Further Education.
- Ms Pamela Hibbert, Assistant Director, Policy and Research Unit, Barnardo’s. For services to Children and Families.
- Miss Sheila Christine Hindes, Sheriffdom Business Manager, Scottish Court Service, Scottish Government.
- The Honourable Frances Evelyn, Mrs. Hoare. For services to the Administration of Justice.
- Susan Mary Woodford-Hollick (Lady Hollick). For services to the Arts.
- Adrian Holmes. For services to Skills and Training.
- Ms Johanna Holmes, Chair, East Homes Housing Association. For services to the Housing Sector.
- Robert Holt, lately Chief Executive, Ryder Cup 2010 Ltd. For services to Golf.
- Sir Alexander Archibald Douglas Hope, Bt., Managing Director, Double Negative. For services to the Visual Effects Industry.
- Dr. Keith Howard, Philanthropist. For services to Business, Sport and to the Arts in West Yorkshire.
- Professor Michael Hughes, Chairman, EA Technology. For services to the Electricity Industry.
- Peter Hulme, lately Clinical Psychologist and Head of Profession for Psychology, Herefordshire Primary Care Trust. For services to Mental Healthcare.
- Professor John Rotherham Hunter, Emeritus Professor of Ancient History and Archaeology, University of Birmingham. For services to Scholarship.
- Professor Judith May Hutchings, Director, Centre for Evidence-Based Early Intervention, Bangor University. For services to Children and Families.
- Stephen Inch, lately Executive Director of Development and Regeneration, Glasgow City Council. For services to Local Government.
- Ms Tamara Ingram, Chair, Visit London. For services to the Tourist Industry.
- Dr. Margaret Jennings, Head, Research Animals Department RSPCA. For services to Animal Welfare.
- Gordon Jeyes, lately Director of Children’s Services and Deputy Chief Executive, Cambridgeshire County Council. For services to Local Government.
- Dr. Robert John, lately Chief Executive Officer, Welding Institute. For services to Industry.
- Professor Ronald John Johnston, Professor of Geography, University of Bristol. For services to Scholarship.
- Ms Helen Jones, Professional Adviser, Children in Care Division, Department for Education.
- Pauline Ann, Mrs. Jones, Assistant Director, Children’s Workforce Development Council. For services to Early Years Education.
- Dr. Richard Alec Jones, Conflict Adviser, Afghanistan, Department for International Development.
- Judith, Mrs. Kelly, Tobacco Policy Branch Manager, Excise Policy, Manchester, H.M. Revenue and Customs.
- Professor Ian Kimber. Professor and Chairman of Toxicology, University of Manchester. For services to Science.
- Ms Diane Kingaby, Sure Start Children’s Centres Service Manager, Nottinghamshire County Council. For services to Families.
- Louise Anne, Mrs. Kingham, Chief Executive, Energy Institute. For services to the Energy Industry.
- Douglas Kirkpatrick, Grade B1, Ministry of Defence.
- Hawa Bibi, Mrs. Laher, Headteacher, Spring Grove Junior, Infants and Nursery, Kirklees, West Yorkshire. For services to Education.
- Professor Richard Lane, lately Director of Science, Natural History Museum. For services to Museums.
- Captain Victor Richard Law. For voluntary service to St. John Ambulance.
- Michael Kenneth Lees, lately Governor, H.M. Prison Acklington, Northumberland, Ministry of Justice.
- The Honourable John Barnabas Leith. For services to the Baha ́’ ́ı Faith and to Inter-Faith Relations.
- Clive Oscar Lewis, Chairman, REACH Project and Director, Globis Ltd. For public service.
- Rhisiart Tomos Lewis, lately Chairman, Board of Directors, South Caernarfon Creameries. For services to the Dairy Industry.
- Dr. Ann Geraldine Limb, D.L. For public service and for services to Education.
- Ms Beverly Isadore Lindsay. For services to Business and to the community in Birmingham.
- Jean Elizabeth, Mrs. Llewellyn, Chief Executive, National Skills Academy for Nuclear. For services to the Energy Industry.
- David Charles Lockwood, Managing Director, Thales. For services to Industry in Scotland.
- Councillor Charles Edward Lord, J.P., Lead for Equalities and Social Inclusion, Local Government Association. For public service.
- John Neil Loughhead, Executive Director, UK Energy Research Centre. For services to Technology.
- Ian Moncrieff Lowrie, Chief Executive, Adur District Council and Worthing Borough Council. For services to Local Government in West Sussex.
- David Lyle, Chief Executive, Lyle Bailie International. For services to Road Safety in Northern Ireland.
- Douglas Thomas Mahoney, International Trade Director, West Midlands Region, Department for Business, Innovation and Skills.
- Ms Rajinder Kaur Mann. For services to Black and Minority Ethnic People.
- Graham Leslie Marchant. For services to the Arts.
- Dr. Stephen Marsh-Smith. For services to the Environment and to Conservation on the Rivers Wye and Usk.
- Ms Claire Martin, Jazz Singer. For services to Music.
- Paul Darren Martin, Chief Executive, Lesbian and Gay Foundation. For services to Equal Opportunities.
- Thomas McAlpine, Chairman, Mood Swings Network Charity. For services to Mental Healthcare.
- Miss Christine Byrne McCann, lately Headteacher, Notre Dame Catholic College for Arts, Liverpool. For services to Education.
- David Alexander McClurg, M.B.E., Chairman, Northern Ireland Police Fund. For services to the Police in Northern Ireland.
- Philip McDonagh. For public service in Northern Ireland.
- Roy James McEwan, Chief Executive, Scottish Chamber Orchestra. For services to Music.
- Professor William Alexander Campbell McKelvey, Chief Executive and Principal, Scottish Agricultural College. For services to the Agricultural Industry. *David McKenna, Chief Executive, Victim Support Scotland. For services to Disadvantaged People.
- Dr. Alan Lorimer McKenzie, Director of Medical Physics and Bioengineering, University Hospitals Bristol NHS Foundation Trust. For services to Medicine.
- John McMullan, M.B.E., Chief Executive, Bryson Charitable Group. For services to Social Enterprise in Northern Ireland.
- Miss Bernadette McNally, Director, Social and Primary Care Services and Executive Director, Social Work, Belfast Health and Social Care Trust. For public service.
- Ms Heather Jean Mellows, lately Consultant Obstetrician and Gynaecologist, Doncaster and Bassetlaw Hospitals NHS Foundation Trust, South Yorkshire. For services to Medicine.
- Emran Mian, lately Secretary, Independent Review of Higher Education Funding and Student Finance, Department for Business, Innovation and Skills.
- Iain Henry Miller, Vice-Chairman, Doosan Power Systems Ltd. For services to the Engineering Industry.
- Jane White Bridgid, Mrs. Miller, Headteacher, West Earlham Infant School, Norfolk. For services to Education.
- Dr. William Hugh Milroy, Chief Executive, Veterans’ Aid. For services to ex-Servicemen and Women.
- Meena, Mrs. Modi, Headteacher, Chater Infant School, Hertfordshire. For services to Education.
- Dr. John Michael Mohin. For services to Industry and to Charity in the North West.
- Peter Kevin Moore. For services to the Life Sciences and Chemicals Industry in Scotland.
- Graham John Morris. For services to the Motor Industry and to Charity.
- Ms Mia Judith Morris. For services to Black Heritage and to the community in South London.
- Keith Mowbray, Group Business Development Director, Dytecna Ltd. For services to the Defence Industry.
- Ms Angela Mary Murphy, Deputy Vice-Chancellor (International), University of Central Lancashire. For services to Higher Education.
- Wendy, Mrs. Murphy, Grade B2, Ministry of Defence. James Murray. For services to People with Autism.
- Dr. Roger Harvey Neighbour, Primary Care Educator, London. For services to Medical Education.
- Stephen Christopher Neville. For charitable services.
- Professor Donald Nicolson, Director, University of Strathclyde Law Clinic. For services to the Legal Profession.
- Bronwen Eileen, Mrs. Northmore, lately Director, Cleaner Fossil Fuels Directorate, Department of Energy and Climate Change.
- Frank Goodwin Norville, Chairman, Norville Optical. For services to Manufacturing.
- Professor Elisabeth Willemien Paice, Visiting Professor, Professorial Department of Surgery, Imperial College. For services to Medicine.
- John David Parkinson, Assistant Chief Constable, West Yorkshire Police. For services to the Police.
- Mark Nigel Parkinson, Head, Devolution Branch, Devolved Countries Unit, H.M. Treasury.
- Mayank Bachubhai Patel, Group Chairman and Chief Executive Officer, Azibo Group. For services to the Financial Services Industry and to Entrepreneurship. *Professor Audrey Margarete Paterson, Director of Professional Policy, Society of Radiographers. For services to Healthcare.
- Dr. Kay Pattison, National Research Programme Manager, Research and Development Directorate, Department of Health.
- Ms Beverley Penney. For services to Ramblers in Cymru.
- Dr. Geoffrey Norman James Port. For services to Higher Education.
- Catherine, Mrs. Purdy, Chief Executive, Vela Homes. For services to Local Government.
- Mark Pyper, lately Principal, Gordonstoun School, Elgin. For services to Education.
- Professor Nirmala Rao, Pro-Director (Learning and Teaching) and Professor of Politics, School of Oriental and African Studies. For services to Scholarship.
- Samuel Glenn Reilly, lately Principal, Limavady High School. For services to Education in Northern Ireland.
- Jeremy Whichcote Phillips Richardson, lately Chief Executive, Injured Jockey’s Fund. For services to Horseracing.
- Charles Mark Ridgway, Managing Director, Group Rhodes. For services to Industry.
- Philip Roberts, Assistant Director, Airspace Policy, Civil Aviation Authority. For services to the Airline Industry.
- Simon Roberts, Chief Executive Officer, Centre for Sustainable Energy. For services to the Renewables Industry.
- Nicholas Robertson, Chief Executive, ASOS.com. For services to the Fashion Industry.
- Rebecca, Mrs. Rumpler, Founding Director, Side-by- Side. For services to Special Educational Needs.
- Stephen Rumsey. For services to Nature Conservation.
- Kuldip Rupra. For services to Black and Minority Ethnic Communities in the East of England.
- Mark Henry Sanders, Chief Executive, Bury Council. For services to Local Government.
- Christopher Schultheiss, Chief Executive, Superletter.com. For services to the Armed Forces.
- Diana Catherine Brett, Mrs. Schumacher. For services to the Environment, Sustainable Development and to Humanitarian Issues.
- Paul Edwin Sewell. For services to Business and to the community in Kingston-upon-Hull.
- Jill, Mrs. Shortland. For services to Local Government in Somerset.
- Dr. Nasser Siabi, Chief Executive, Microlink PC (UK) Ltd. For services to Disabled People.
- Professor Mona Siddiqui, Director, Centre for the Study of Islam, University of Glasgow. For services to Inter-Faith Relations.
- Dr. Kanwaljit Kaur-Singh, Chair, British Sikh Educational Council. For services to Education and to Inter-Faith Understanding.
- Alan Smith, Head, Data Visualisation Unit, Methodology Directorate, Office for National Statistics.
- David Sparkes. For services to Swimming.
- Ms Marcelle Speller, Philanthropist. For services to the Voluntary Sector.
- John Hall Spencer. For services to Business, Charity and to Young People in London.
- Gavin Stewart, lately Deputy Pension Centre Manager, Motherwell Pension Centre, Pension, Disability and Carers’ Service, Department for Work and Pensions.
- Professor Peter Gregory Stone, Professor of Heritage Studies, International Centre for Cultural and Heritage Studies, Newcastle University. For services to Heritage Education.
- Andrew John Strauss, M.B.E., England Captain. For services to Cricket.
- Paul Victor Sutton, Principal, Greig City Academy, London Borough of Haringey. For services to Education.
- Jenny, Mrs. Talbot, Programme Manager, No One Knows, Prison Reform Trust. For services to People with Special Needs.
- Dr. David William Roger Thackray, Head of Archaeology, National Trust. For services to Heritage.
- Professor Jeremy Ambler Thomas, Professor of Ecology. For services to Science.
- Richard Gear Thomas, Chief Executive Officer, Gatehouse Bank. For services to Islamic Financial Services.
- George Jolyon Hay Thomson, Government Lawyer, Department for Environment, Food and Rural Affairs.
- Stephen Tilley, Senior Manager A, H.M. Prison Full Sutton, York, Ministry of Justice.
- James Timpson, Chief Executive, Timpson Ltd. For services to Training and Employment for Disadvantaged People.
- Glyn Vaughan, Area and Coastal Flood Risk Manager, (Cumbria and Lancashire), Environment Agency. For services to Flood Defence.
- Ramesh Kumari, Mrs. Verma, Chief Executive, EKTA Charity. For services to Older People in East London.
- Adrian Voce, Director, Play England. For services to Children.
- Harold Edward Wardle, J.P. For services to the community in Shropshire.
- Ms Gillian Wearing, Conceptual Artist. For services to Art.
- William Webb, lately Chief Executive, Progressive Building Society. For services to the Financial Services Industry in Northern Ireland.
- Ms Gillian Margaret Weeks, Regulatory Affairs Director, Veolia Environmental Services plc. For services to the Waste Industry.
- Professor William James Wells, lately Chief Executive, Tayside NHS Board. For services to Healthcare.
- Lee John Westwood. For services to Golf.
- Haydn White, Chairman, Infrastructure Committee, British Standards Institution. For services to the Water Industry.
- Dr. Elizabeth Ann Williams, Principal, West Suffolk College. For services to Further Education.
- Professor Geraint Trefor Williams, Professor of Pathology, Cardiff University School of Medicine. For services to Medicine.
- Philip John Willoughby, J.P. For services to the City of London Corporation and to Charity.
- Jean Ellen, Mrs. Willson. For services to People with Learning Disabilities and their Family Carers.
- Ms Samantha Taylor-Wood, Artist and Photographer. For services to the Arts.
- Charles Basil Woodd, Team Leader, Community Development Team, Community Action Division, Department for Communities and Local Government.
- Susan Mary Woodford-Hollick (Lady Hollick). For services to the Arts.
- Robert Sidney Woodward, J.P. For services to the Health and Safety Executive.
- Miss Jenny Shalina Wynne. For services to the Papal Visit.

==== Members (MBE) – partial list ====
- Fiona Margaret, Mrs. Adams. For services to the community in Moseley, Birmingham.
- Thomas Arthur Adams. For services to the Voluntary Sector.
- James Morrison Alexander. For services to Scottish Traditional Music.
- Liaquat Ali. For services to Local Government in the London Borough of Waltham Forest.
- Raymond George Allsop. For services to the community in Stafford.
- Joyce, Mrs. Amato, European Co-ordinator, Newham College of Further Education, London. For services to Education.
- Alison, Mrs. Anderson. For services to Anatomical Pathology.
- Dr. Don Anthony. For services to Sport.
- Dr. Graham Eric Archard, general medical practitioner, Christchurch, Dorset. For services to Healthcare.
- Peter Armitage. For services to Amateur Theatre in West Yorkshire.
- Jonathan Arnold. For services to English Furniture Makers.
- Miss Coral Rosa Ashby, administrative officer, Debt Management and Banking, Swansea, H.M. Revenue and Customs.
- Paul Ashley, chairman, Clark Door Ltd. For services to Industry in Cumbria.
- Peter David Atkins. For services to Journalism and to the community in Staffordshire.
- Ms Kate Atkinson, Author. For services to Literature.
- Professor Stephanie Atkinson, Professor of Design and Technology Education, University of Sunderland. For services to Higher Education.
- Ian August. For voluntary service to Alnwick Gardens, Northumberland.
- Ms Lynne Anita Babbington. For services to Educational Psychology in the London Borough of Harrow.
- Brenda May, Mrs. Bailey. For services to the community in Chacewater, Cornwall.
- Joseph William Baldwin. For services to Health and Safety in the Construction Industry.
- Dr. David Melville Balfour, Professional Executive Committee chairman and clinical director, NHS Hampshire. For services to Healthcare.
- Katherine, Mrs. Bance. For services to the community in Penge, London Borough of Bromley.
- Frances Barbara Molyneux, Lady Banham. For services to the community in Cornwall.
- Lilian, Mrs. Barker. For services to the community in Chesterton, Newcastle-under-Lyme, Staffordshire.
- Lavinia Blanche, Mrs. Barlow. For voluntary service to Macmillan Cancer Support.
- Diana Francesca Caroline Clare, Mrs. Barran. For services to the Victims of Domestic Violence.
- Ms Maureen Bateson. For services to Blackburn with Darwen Borough Council.
- Anne, Mrs. Baxter. For voluntary service to Girlguiding in the Forth Valley, Scotland.
- Patricia Ann, Mrs. Bazeley. For services to the Samaritans Central London Branch.
- Mark Beautement, Grade C1, Ministry of Defence.
- John William Beavis, Grade C2, Ministry of Defence.
- David Llewellyn Bebb, lately chairman of Governors, Chelmsford County High School for Girls. For voluntary service to Education.
- Noel Brian Bedder. For services to the community in Leicester.
- Linda, Mrs. Beddows. For services to the community in Lytham St. Annes, Lancashire.
- Philip Benyon, Cross Government Solutions Group IT programme manager, Corporate IT, Department for Work and Pensions.
- Keith Berry, secretary and Founder Trustee, Birch Thompson Memorial Fund. For services to Young People in Wolverhampton, West Midlands.
- Edna Ida May, Mrs. Bessell. For services to Lawn Bowls.
- Patricia Lesley, Mrs. Best, area manager, Probation Service for Northern Ireland. For public service.
- Shirley, Mrs. Best, executive officer, Sure Start and Early Intervention Division, Department for Education.
- Jonathan Leonard Bielby, organist and director of music, Wakefield Cathedral. For services to Choral Music.
- Lorna, Mrs. Bilke, J.P., lately executive officer, Jobcentre Plus, Department for Work and Pensions.
- Miss Ena Bingham, epilepsy nurse specialist. For services to People with Epilepsy in Northern Ireland.
- The Reverend Michael Alan Binstock. For services to H.M. Prison Service and to Jewish Prisoners.
- Barry Sidney Birch. For services to the community on the Fylde Coast, Lancashire.
- Jack Birkenshaw. For services to Cricket.
- Janet, Mrs. Birkin, J.P., D.L., lately chair, Derbyshire Police Authority. For services to the Police and to the community in Derbyshire.
- The Reverend Prebendary Philippa Jane Boardman. For services to Heritage in East London.
- John Bolster, head of Estate Policy and Strategy, Cabinet Office.
- Keith Wallace Boot, chairman, Amber Valley Access Group. For voluntary service to Disabled People in Derbyshire.
- Frederick Arthur Booth. For services to Wildlife Conservation in Kent.
- Catherine, Mrs. Borsumato. For services to Cleveland Police.
- Elizabeth Ann, Mrs. Boswell. For services to Adoption and Fostering in the North West.
- Peter Griffith Boursnell. For services to Fair Access to Higher Education.
- Colonel Michael Cameron Bowden, trustee, Rowdeford Charity Trust, Wiltshire. For services to Special Educational Needs.
- Diana, Mrs. Bown, D.L. For voluntary service to Equestrian Sport.
- Philip Boyle, lately physics teacher, Hummersknott School and Language College, Darlington. For services to Education.
- Stephen Brailey, chief executive, Sheffield International Venues. For services to the Leisure Industry.
- Ms Michaela Alica Breeze. For services to Weightlifting.
- Ms Tricia Brennan, head, Criminal Justice Department, Essex Police. For services to the Police.
- Romy, Mrs. Briant. For services to the Prevention of Domestic Violence in Oxfordshire.
- James Ronald Brooks. For services to Libraries in Little Chalfont, Buckinghamshire.
- Ms Deborah Browett, lately chair, Spectrum Support Network, Home Office.
- James Brown. For services to the community in EastBelfast, Northern Ireland.
- Margaret, Mrs. Bruhin. For voluntary service to the British Red Cross Society in North Wales.
- Patricia Doris, Mrs. Budd, breast services manager, Essex County Hospital, Colchester Hospital University NHS Foundation Trust. For services to Healthcare.
- Peter Bunting, programme manager, KBR. For services to the Defence Industry.
- Gary Burchmore. For services to the community in Goldington, Bedford.
- Christine Marjorie, Mrs. Burden. For services to Older People in Oxford.
- Carolyn Mary, Mrs. Burgess. For services to Business in Yorkshire and the Humber.
- Michael Richard Butler, D.L., county commissioner, Norfolk Scouts. For services to Young People.
- Nazir Ahmed Butt. For services to Community Cohesion in the London Borough of Waltham Forest.
- Councillor Joan Butterfield, chair, Rhuddlan Borough Council. For services to Local Government in Rhyl, Denbighshire.
- Shaun Joseph Byatt, manager, Dorset Mental Health Forum. For services to Healthcare.
- Pauline, Mrs. Byers, nurse and company director, Practice Development Unit, Derby. For services to Healthcare.
- Diana Vivienne, Mrs. Caldicott. For voluntary service to the WRVS Laundry Service in Malvern, Worcestershire.
- Princess, Mrs. Campbell. For services to the community in Bristol.
- Lesley Catherine, Mrs. Caple. For services to the Medical Research Council.
- Gilo Cardozo, director, Gilo Industries Research Ltd and Parajet UK Ltd. For services to Business.
- Phyllis Elizabeth Margaret, Mrs. Carrothers, chair, Royal Ulster Constabulary George Cross Widows' Association. For services to the community in Northern Ireland.
- Irene, Mrs. Carson. For services to the community in Greenisland, Northern Ireland.
- Miss Jacqueline Anne Cass. For voluntary service to Thames Valley Kings Wheelchair Basketball Club.
- Mark Cavendish, for services to British Cycling.
- Charles Cecil, director, Revolution Software Ltd. For services to the Computer Games Industry.
- Dr. Betty Maureen Chambers, chair of Admissions Appeals Panel, Peterborough and Cambridgeshire. For services to Education.
- Professor Jose Elizabeth Chambers, director, Winchester Comino Foundation and lately assistant vice-chancellor, University of Winchester. For services to Higher Education.
- Jane, Mrs. Chapman, manager and director, Living Springs Family Centre. For services to Families in the West Midlands.
- Major Ronald Charles William Chisholm, lately Grade C1, Ministry of Defence.
- Alan Christie, senior professional and technology officer, Department of Energy and Climate Change.
- Charles Clapham, chairman, Palace Chemicals Ltd. For services to Manufacture and to Football in Merseyside.
- Ms Claire Clark, patissier. For services to the Food Industry.
- James Clark, chairman, Croft Community. For services to Special Needs in Northern Ireland.
- Helen Mary, Mrs. Clarke. For services to Mental Healthcare in Surrey.
- Miss Mary Ruth Clarke, head of Midwifery Services, Belfast Trust and chair, Managers' Forum, Royal College of Midwives Northern Ireland. For services to Healthcare.
- Linda, Mrs. Clarkson. For services to the community in Chorleywood, Hertfordshire.
- Miss Doreen Cheryl Class. For services to Young People in the London Borough of Hackney.
- Ms Catherine Mary Clear. For services to the community in Tordmorden, West Yorkshire.
- Dr. Robin Edward Stevenson Clegg, head of Science in Society, Science and Technology Facilities Council. For services to Science.
- Shirley Grace, Mrs. Clemo. For services to Gardening in St. Austell, Cornwall.
- Ms Jacqueline Ann Clifton. For services to Music and to Visually Impaired People.
- Michael Carey Clinch. For services to Victims and Witnesses in Somerset.
- Douglas Cobb. For services to the community in Ipswich, Suffolk.
- Miss Christine Cole, epilepsy nurse specialist. For services to People with Special Needs.
- Bryan Arthur Collier. For services to the community in the London Borough of Newham.
- Clive Hugh Austin Collins, cartoonist and illustrator. For services to Art.
- David Robert Compton. For services to Young People through The Duke of Edinburgh Award Scheme and in The Gambia.
- Peter Connolly, constable, Police Service of Northern Ireland. For services to the Police.
- Alastair Nathan Cook, for services to Cricket.
- Dr. Shirley Cooke. For voluntary service to Swimming in the North West.
- Stanley Cooke. For voluntary service to Carers and to People with Special Needs in Northumberland.
- Beverley, Mrs. Coombs, manager, Sure Start Children’s Centre, Gateshead. For services to Families.
- John Corcoran, chief executive, Dunbartonshire Chamber of Commerce. For services to Business.
- Ms Winsome Grace Cornish. For services to Black and Minority Ethnic People in London.
- Helen Mabel, Mrs. Cowell. For services to the community in Bovey Tracey, South Devon.
- Ms Mary Coyle, D.L. For services to Leadership in the community in the North East.
- Ms Phyllis Craig. For services to Sufferers of Asbestos-related Diseases.
- Jennifer Anne, Mrs. Cripps. For services to Heritage in Kirton-in-Lindsey, Lincolnshire.
- Dr. Pamela June Crook, Painter. For services to Art.
- Roderick Anthony Crook. For services to Education and to Fostering in Devon.
- Margaret, Mrs. Crooks. For services to the community in Cookstown, Northern Ireland.
- Amanda Catherine, Mrs. Crust, administration officer, Lost Stolen and Recovered Passport Team Examiner, Identity and Passport Service Belfast, Home Office.
- Jean, Mrs. Cullen. For services to the community in Eastham, Wirral, Merseyside.
- Dr. Peter Gerard Cunningham, principal, Ceara Special School. For services to Education in Northern Ireland.
- Scott Cunningham, administration officer, customer operations, Edinburgh, H.M. Revenue and Customs.
- Rosemary Theresa, Mrs. Cusack, chair, Debdale and Woodlands Community Association. For services to the community in Gorton, Manchester.
- Mark Bernard Cutler. For services to Maxillofacial Prosthetics.
- Sheila Maeve, Mrs. Daley, clerk to the corporation, Westminster Kingsway College. For services to Further Education.
- Donald Dargavel. For services to the community in Hyde, Cheshire.
- Margaret Rose, Mrs. Dargavel. For services to the community in Hyde, Cheshire.
- Ms Susan Dauncey, legal adviser, Avon and Somerset Constabulary. For services to the Police.
- Ann Peregrine, Mrs. Davies, lately chair, Neighbourhood Watch Association. For services to the community in Swansea.
- Colonel David Llewellin Davies, T.D., D.L. For services to Farming in Wales.
- Dr. Jeremy Robin Davies, honorary research associate, British Geological Survey. For services to Science.
- John Davies, lately director for Wales, Planning Inspectorate, Department for Communities and Local Government.
- Michael Davies. For services to Livestock Farming in West Wales.
- Michael Roger Davies. For services to the Co-operative Movement and to the community in South Wales.
- Richard James Davies, director, Marches Energy Agency. For services to Sustainable Energy.
- Ann, Mrs. Davis, executive officer, Corporate IT, Department for Work and Pensions.
- Dr. Jane Davis, founder, Reader Organisation. For services to Reader Development.
- Mark Anthony Davis, Grade C2, Ministry of Defence.
- Teresa, Mrs. Dawes, lately teacher, Park House School and Sports College, Berkshire. For services to Education.
- William Thompson Dawson. For voluntary service to Leukaemia Research in Northern Ireland.
- James Julian Dean. For services to Social Housing in South West London.
- John William Deeble. For services to the community in Alnwick, Northumberland.
- Jane Elizabeth, Mrs. Delfino, director of enterprise and internationalism, United Learning Trust, Manchester Academy. For services to Education.
- Christopher Peter Denard, head of Trading Standards, Surrey County Council. For services to Local Government and to Consumers.
- Gurcharan Singh Dhesi, sergeant, Metropolitan Police Special Constabulary. For services to the Police.
- Geoffrey Ronald Dicks. For services to Macroeconomics.
- Ms Jan Dinsdale. For services to the Sport of Blind Golf in Northern Ireland.
- Elsie, Mrs. Dixon. For services to the community in Benwell, Newcastle upon Tyne.
- Robert Hugh David Dixon. For services to Heritage in the North East.
- Councillor William Gene Dixon. For services to Local Government in Darlington, County Durham.
- Ms Joy Doal. For services to Vulnerable Women in Birmingham.
- Geoffrey Dodds. For services to the community in Sunderland, Tyne and Wear.
- Julia Catherine, Mrs. Donaldson, Author and Playwright. For services to Literature.
- Ms Kirstie Donnelly, director of products and marketing, Ufi/learndirect. For services to Further Education.
- David Patrick Dossett. For services to the Electrical Manufacturing Industry.
- Edward Colin Dowdeswell. For services to Education and to Music in Norwich.
- Robert Henry Dowler. For services to the Voluntary Sector.
- Michael William Doyle, craft team line manager, Parliamentary Estates Directorate, House of Parliament.
- Hashim Ismail Duale. For services to Community Cohesion in Leicester.
- David Andrew Duckett, watch manager, Southam Fire Station. For services to the community in Warwickshire.
- Denise Ann, Mrs. Duffy, lately senior executive officer, Jobcentre Plus, Department for Work and Pensions.
- Margaret, Mrs. Duncan. For services to People with Special Needs in Fife.
- Peter Dunning. For services to Rural Communities in Devon.
- Timothy John Dymond, Grade C1, Ministry of Defence.
- Thomas John Ebdon, D.L. For services to the community in Sussex.
- John Lewis Ecclestone, sound archivist, National Trust. For services to Heritage.
- Barry Edwards, architect, Commonwealth War Graves Commission. For services to Heritage.
- Charles Roy Elms. For voluntary service to SSAFA Forces Help in South Yorkshire.
- Miss Jessica Ennis. For services to Athletics.
- Angela Helen, Mrs. Evans, respiratory physiologist, NHS Stoke Primary Care Trust. For services to Healthcare.
- Ms Non Evans. For services to Sport.
- Mark Stephen Faint, chairman, Cheshire Police Federation. For services to the Police.
- Eric James Farrell. For services to Canoeing.
- Isobel Anne, Mrs. Fenton, director, Institute of Professional Legal Studies. For services to Legal Education in Northern Ireland.
- Janet, Mrs. Fernau, founder and chair, Haemochromatosis Society. For voluntary service to Healthcare.
- John Noel Fieldus. For charitable services to the Spinal Injuries Association.
- Ainsley Forbes. For services to Social Housing in London.
- Ian Forbes. For services to Heritage in the North Pennines.
- Lesley, Mrs. Forrest. For voluntary service to Transplant Sports.
- John Forsyth. For services to Music in Teesside.
- John Bryan Foulkes. For services to the community in Powys.
- Augustine Leith Francis. For services to Steel Pan Music.
- Kaye, Mrs. Franklin. For services to the Voluntary Sector in Swindon, Wiltshire.
- Paul Frost. For voluntary service to the Royal National Lifeboat Institution, Rhyl, Denbighshire.
- Councillor Dora Dixon-Fyle. For services to Local Government in the London Borough of Southwark.
- Neil Gadsby. For voluntary service to Katharine House Hospice, Oxfordshire.
- Pauline Mary, Mrs. Gallacher. For services to Architecture and to Regeneration in Central Scotland.
- Barry Stanley George. For services to Public Library Services in Luton, Bedfordshire.
- Ms Pauline Geraghty, programme manager, The Children’s Society, Lancashire Children’s Rights Project, Preston. For services to Young People.
- Joan Mary, Mrs. Gibbins, deputy council officer, Institution of Mechanical Engineers. For services to Technology.
- Percy Gilbert. For services to the community in Swansea.
- Patricia Lilian, Mrs. Gilman, lunchtime supervisor, Kenmore Park First School, London Borough of Harrow. For services to Education.
- Richard Gleadhill. For services to the Multiple Sclerosis Society.
- John Glendinning, higher officer, Capital Gains Tax Team, Local Compliance, Washington, H.M. Revenue and Customs.
- Colin Godfrey, activities development nurse, Oxford Health NHS Foundation Trust. For services to Healthcare.
- Ivan Michael Godfrey, lately chairman of Governors, Two Moors Primary School, Devon. For services to Education.
- Catherine Wendy, Mrs. Goldstraw. For services to Local Government in Scotland.
- Ms Alison Good, lately information services manager, Scottish Poisons Information Bureau. For services to Healthcare.
- Valerie, Mrs. Good. For services to Gardening, particularly to the Sweetpea Flower in Wem, Shropshire.
- Althea Lavinia, Mrs. Gordon. For services to Classical Music in Perthshire.
- Geoffrey Arthur Gorham. For voluntary service to St. John Ambulance in Hertfordshire.
- Dr. Leslie George Goulding. For services to Clinical Science.
- Air Commodore Peter Gover, A.F.C., D.L. For services to the Voluntary Sector in Rutland.
- Alan Philip Graham. For voluntary service, particularly to the Motor Neurone Disease Association.
- Dr. James Alexander Grant, general medical practitioner. For services to Community Healthcare in Scotland.
- Jean Frances, Mrs. Grant. For services to Mental Healthcare in Somerset.
- Adam William Gray, deputy station officer, Dunbar Coastguard Rescue Service. For services to Maritime Safety in East Lothian.
- Ms Maxine Greaves. For services to Sure Start Children’s Centre, Sheffield.
- Thea, Mrs. Green, founder, Nails Inc. For services to the Beauty Industry.
- Denis Ross Grey, senior executive officer, Special Cases Directorate, UK Border Agency, Home Office.
- Paul Yorke Griffith, chairman, Worcester Municipal Charities. For services to the Voluntary Sector.
- Miss Elizabeth Jane (Beti) Griffiths. For services to the community in Llanilar, Ceredigion.
- May Rose, Mrs. Griffiths. For services to the community in Wombourne, South Staffordshire.
- Melita, Mrs. Gripton, lately administrative officer, Jobcentre Plus, Department for Work and Pensions.
- Barbara Patricia, Mrs. Gronnow, administrative officer, Fraud Investigation Service, Jobcentre Plus, Department for Work and Pensions.
- Sue, Mrs. Groves, interventions caseworker, Small Medium Enterprise Team, London, H.M. Revenue and Customs.
- Josephine, Mrs. Guerin, Co-ordinator, Specialist Paediatric HIV Service, St. Mary’s Hospital, Paddington. For services to Healthcare.
- Alan Osborne Guy. For services to the British Korean Veterans' Association.
- Dr. John Ruff Gwilt. For services to the community in Roade, Northamptonshire.
- Roland Frederick Haggerwood. For voluntary service to the Royal British Legion in Bedfordshire.
- Christine, Mrs. Haines. For services to the community in Frensham, Surrey.
- Captain Graham Hall. For voluntary service to the Royal National Lifeboat Institution, Bembridge, Isle of Wight.
- Ian Robert Hall, operations director, NATS. For services to the Airline Industry.
- Robert Hall. For services to Cramlington Voluntary Youth Project, Blyth Valley, Northumberland.
- Joanne, Mrs. Hamer, Grade C1, Ministry of Defence.
- Paula Christine, Mrs. Hammond, J.P. For services to the community in Nottinghamshire.
- Hamish Graeme Hardie, deputy chairman, Clyde Maritime Trust. For voluntary service to Maritime Heritage in Scotland.
- Jean, Mrs. Hardy, chair of governors, West Nottinghamshire College. For voluntary service to Further Education.
- Christine Anne, Mrs. Harlow. For services to the Scope Charity in Greater Manchester.
- Miss Joyce Millicent Harper. For services to Dance in Bristol.
- Denzil Hart. For voluntary service to Grassroots Football in the North West.
- Peter John Harvey, national chairman, Motor Schools Association of Great Britain. For services to Road Safety and Training.
- Ms Annamarie Hassall (Mrs. Hiscox), director of delivery support, Together for Children. For services to Families.
- Hilary, Mrs. Hastings, programme manager, Birchills and North Walsall Sure Start Children’s Centre. For services to Families.
- Clifford John Hathaway, press officer, Communications and Marketing, Stoke-on-Trent, H.M. Revenue and Customs.
- Patricia Ann, Mrs. Hatton. For services to the community in Wollaton, Nottinghamshire.
- Mary Ruth, Mrs. Hawgood. For services to the community in Durham.
- Dr. Dorothy Heathcote. For services to Drama as Education.
- Heather, Councillor Mrs. Henshaw. For services to the National Society for the Prevention of Cruelty to Children and to the community in Mansfield, Nottinghamshire.
- Joseph Leslie Henson, founder, Rare Breeds Survival Trust and Cotswold Farm Park. For services to Conservation.
- Ms Joan Henthorn, lately senior laboratory scientist, National Screening Programme for Sickle Cell and Thalassaemia Programme, Central Middlesex Hospital, London. For services to Healthcare.
- Ronald Hamby Hepworth. For services to the community in Woodbridge, Suffolk.
- Peter Hewitt. For services to the community in Tilbury, Essex.
- Nigel Hildreth, head of music and performing arts, Colchester Sixth Form College. For services to Education.
- Edward John Hill. For services to the Voluntary Sector in Hertfordshire, Bedfordshire and London.
- Elliott Hill. For services to Young People in Berwick- upon-Tweed, Northumberland.
- Michael James Hill, chairman, Charing Cross Kidney Patients' Association. For services to Healthcare.
- Rodney Augustus Sidney Hodgman. For services to the community in Bath, Somerset.
- Penelope Christine, Mrs. Hoey. For services to Heritage in Kirton-in-Lindsey, Lincolnshire.
- Joyce, Mrs. Holgate. For services to Local Government in Ribble Valley, Lancashire.
- David Andrew Holmes, director, How Hill Trust. For services to Environmental Education in Norfolk.
- Jenifer Ann (Jane), Mrs. Holmes. For services to Save the Children in Wells, Somerset.
- Frank Horwill, Athletics Coach. For voluntary service to Sport.
- Laurie, Mrs. Hough, senior executive officer, Child Support Agency, Department for Work and Pensions.
- Kathleen Patricia, Mrs. Hovey. For services to the community in Kendal, Cumbria.
- Ms Carolyn Howell. For services to the Mortgage Rescue Scheme.
- Amanda, Mrs. Hudson. For services to the community in Fleetwood, Lancashire.
- Ms Bronach Hughes. For services to the community in Thames Ditton, Surrey.
- David Brinley Hughes. For services to HMS Trincomalee and to the Tourist Industry in Hartlepool, County Durham.
- Michael John Hughes. For services to Legal Education.
- Rowenna Margaret, Mrs. Hughes, lately physiotherapist, King’s College Hospital, London. For services to Healthcare and to Disabled People.
- Robert Hull, Grade C1, Ministry of Defence.
- Delyth, Mrs. Humfryes, chair, Dyfed Powys Police Authority. For services to the community in West Wales.
- Raymond John Humphries. For services to the community in Shaftesbury, Dorset.
- Barbara Doris, Mrs. Hobbs-Hurrell, foster carer, Southend-on-Sea Council. For services to Families.
- Maurice Hobbs-Hurrell, foster carer, Southend-on-Sea Council. For services to Families.
- Azhar Hussain. For services to Motorsport.
- Louis Charles Hylton, constable, West Mercia Police. For services the Police.
- Phillips Idowu. For services to Athletics.
- Alison Jane, Mrs. Ings, chair of Governors, North West Specialist Inclusive Learning Centre. For services to Special Educational Needs.
- John Angus Mackenzie Innes. For services to the Prevention of Environmental Crime.
- Asif Iqbal, project manager, Deaf Parenting UK and Public Appointments Ambassador. For services to Deaf and Disabled People.
- Miss Ann Leslie Irvin. For services to Women’s Golf.
- John Jackson. For services to the community in Weston-Super-Mare, Somerset and Overseas.
- Professor Thomas Beaumont James, professor emeritus of Regional Studies, University of Winchester. For services to Higher Education.
- Miss Uriel Jamieson, lately head of policy and business support, Chief Nursing Officer Directorate, Scottish Government.
- David Ian Jarvie. For services to the community in the Scottish Borders.
- Major Daniel Owen Woolgar Jarvis, M.P., The Parachute Regiment, 547149.
- Susan Elizabeth, Mrs. Jenkinson. For charitable services.
- Ms Jennifer Angela Johnson. For services to Homeless Young People in the West Midlands.
- James Johnsone, director, Tees Valley Living. For services to the Housing Sector in the North East.
- Robert John Johnston, councillor, Fermanagh District Council. For services to Local Government in Northern Ireland.
- Rosemary Christine, Mrs. Jolly. For services to the community in Lancashire.
- Christopher Rufus Jones, national president, Farm Crisis Network. For services to Agriculture.
- Cyril Jones. For services to the community in Rhondda Cynon Taff.
- Elizabeth, Mrs. Martin-Jones, J.P., chair of Governors, Penydre High School. For services to Education and to the community in Merthyr Tydfil.
- Richard Jones, lately deputy director and head of the Employment Relations Team, Royal College of Nursing. For services to Healthcare in Wales.
- The Reverend Winifred Jones. For services to the community in Leighton Buzzard, Bedfordshire.
- Dilys, Mrs. Joyce. For voluntary service to the National Blood Service.
- Walter Anselm Henry Kahn. For services to Gliding.
- Devinder Kalhan, group manager, Adults and Communities Directorate, Birmingham City Council. For services to Local Government and to Inter-Faith Relations.
- Ms Kamaljit Kaur. For services to Equal Opportunities for Asian Women.
- Ian Keith Kemp, head of Operational Command, Traffic, Metropolitan Police Service. For services to the Police.
- Gillian, Mrs. Kennett. For services to Healthcare and to the community in the Isle of Wight.
- Margaret, Mrs. Kerr. For services to Healthcare and to the community in Oswestry, Shropshire.
- Dr. Edward Kessler, founding director, Woolf Institute. For services to Inter-Faith Relations.
- Dr. Christopher John Rossiter Kettler. For services to Orthodontics.
- Ashley Michael Kidd, Grade C1, Ministry of Defence. Robert King. For services to the Tourist Industry and to Disadvantaged People in Norfolk.
- Miss Brooke Kinsella. For services to the Prevention of Knife Crime.
- Julie Hilda, Mrs. Kirby, foster carer, Children’s Family Trust, Worcestershire. For services to Families.
- John Robson Kirkup, curator, Hunterian Museum. For services to Medical Heritage.
- Malcolm Kitson. For voluntary service to Southampton General Hospital.
- Steven Knapik. For services to Young People in Merthyr Tydfil and in Poland.
- David Knight, for services to the Sport of Motorcycling.
- Jyotsna Arun, Mrs. Kotnis. For services to Community Relations in Northamptonshire.
- Parvinder Singh Lalli, executive officer, Jobcentre Plus, Department for Work and Pensions.
- Dr. Donald Ramsay Lamont, H.M. Principal Specialist Inspector of Health and Safety (Civil Engineering), Department for Work and Pensions.
- Sharon, Mrs. Lamont, head of Foundation Stage, Millburn Primary School. For services to Early Years Education in Northern Ireland.
- Margaret Christine, Mrs. Langton. For services to the community in Chattisham, Suffolk.
- John Stephen Scott Langtree, vice-president, Chester Civic Trust. For services to the community in Cheshire.
- Kenneth Lawrence. For charitable services in Neath Port Talbot.
- Joan Elizabeth, Mrs. Lean, deputy head, Cathays Park Facilities Management, Welsh Assembly Government.
- Iris Doreen, Mrs. Leary. For services to the community in Newport Pagnall, Buckinghamshire.
- Joanne, Mrs. Lewis, higher officer, Finance and Performance Team, Benefit and Credits, Preston, H.M. Revenue and Customs.
- Martin John Lightfoot. For services to Heritage in Bury St. Edmunds, Suffolk.
- Christopher Charles Linacre, lately executive director of service development, Sheffield Teaching Hospitals NHS Foundation Trust. For services to Healthcare.
- John Rodney Lingard, T.D., lately higher executive officer, Estates and Facilities Management Division, Department for Education.
- Jason Coeur-de-Lion, IT officer, customer operations, Northampton, H.M. Revenue and Customs.
- Ms Sarah Lloyd. For services to the community in Winchester, Hampshire.
- Kathleen, Mrs. Lovatt, health visitor, NHS Sheffield. For services to Healthcare.
- Derrick Lovell. For voluntary service to Archery.
- Dr. Tim Lucas. For services to Lesbian, Gay, Bisexual and Transgender People.
- Mary, Mrs. Lythgoe. For charitable services in South West Wales.
- Dr. Kenneth James MacDonald. For voluntary service to the Royal British Legion Scotland.
- Michael William Macey. For services to Music and to the community in Welling, Kent.
- Ms Margaret MacKenzie. For services to the community in the Isle of Arran.
- Eric James Walter MacKie. For services to the community in East Grinstead, West Sussex.
- Ms Helen MacKinnon, director of nursing, NHS Education for Scotland. For services to Healthcare.
- Dr. Frederick James MacSorley, general medical practitioner, Lurgan. For services to Healthcare in Northern Ireland.
- Andrea, Mrs. Maddocks, founder and chief executive, Mentor Link Charity. For services to Young People.
- Stephen Magorrian, managing director, Botanic Inns Ltd. For services to the Hospitality Industry and to the community in Northern Ireland.
- Patricia, Mrs. Mann, superintendent registrar, East Riding of Yorkshire. For services to Local Government.
- Judith, Mrs. Manners. For services to the Independent Monitoring Board, H.M. Prison Featherstone, Wolverhampton.
- Winifred Valerie, Mrs. Marrison, lately research postgraduate administrator and student disability officer, School of Geography, University of Leeds. For services to Higher Education.
- John James Shepherd Marston, chairman, Estates and Capital Projects Committee, Ealing Hammersmith and West London College. For services to Further Education.
- David Martin. For services to the community in Leeds.
- Evelyn, Mrs. Martin. For services to Islington Home Care Service, London.
- Kathie, Mrs. Martin, manager, Orbit Care and Repair. For services to Older People in Coventry, West Midlands.
- Dr. Raymond William Matthews, chairman, Friends of Paxton Pits Nature Reserve. For services to Conservation in Cambridgeshire.
- Dolores, Mrs. McAlinden, Home Help. For services to Older People in Kilkeel, County Down.
- Muriel Violet, Mrs. McCabe, client officer, Invest Northern Ireland, Newry Office, Northern Ireland Executive.
- Jill, Mrs. McCleery, J.P., chair of governors, St. Ebbe’s Primary School, Oxford. For voluntary service to Education.
- Edward McCluskey. For services to Disability Swimming in Scotland.
- Samuel David McConkey, principal, Whitehouse Primary School. For services to Education in Northern Ireland.
- Martin McDonald, chief executive, Rural Development Council for Northern Ireland. For services to Regeneration.
- Councillor James McElroy. For services to Local Government and to the community in Banbridge, County Down.
- Paul McGovern. For voluntary service to Young People in Manchester.
- Gerard Anthony McGrath, general manager, Workforce Training Services, West Belfast. For services to Work Based Learning.
- Patricia, Mrs. McGregor, co-founder and managing director, Central Surrey Health. For services to Social Enterprise.
- Duke McKenzie. For services to Boxing in the London Borough of Croydon.
- James McKenzie, director of golf and head greenkeeper, Celtic Manor Resort, Newport, South Wales. For services to Sport.
- Lynne, Mrs. McKenzie, residential manager, H.M. Prison Glenochil, Scottish Prison Service, Scottish Government.
- William Hugh McKeown, chief executive, Yardmaster International. For services to Industry in Northern Ireland.
- Edward McLaughlin. For services to People with Dementia in Scotland.
- Brendan McMurrough, criminal investigator, H.M. Revenue and Customs, London.
- Christopher McPhee, manager E, H.M. Prison Hull, East Riding of Yorkshire, Ministry of Justice.
- Ms Mae McQuillan, chair, Women’s Support Network. For services to the community in Northern Ireland.
- Terence William Mead. For services to the Film Scanning Industry.
- Brian Meharg. For voluntary service to the Royal National Lifeboat Institution, Bangor, County Down.
- Squadron Leader Kevin Mehmet. For voluntary service to the City of London Corporation and to Young People in South East London.
- Peter Robert Metcalf. For services to the community in Preston, Lancashire.
- Ms Christina Miles. For services to Education and Young People in Fife.
- Professor Lesley Millar, Professor of Textiles, University for the Creative Arts. For services to Higher Education.
- Florence Myrtle Ann, Mrs. Mitchell. For voluntary service to Cancer Research in Northern Ireland.
- Robert Henry McClure Mitchell, lately chairman, board of trustees, Concordia, East Sussex. For services to Young People.
- David William Monks. For services to Blind and Partially Sighted People in Coventry, West Midlands.
- Susan Margaret, Mrs. Moore. For services to Girlguiding and to Young People in Northern Ireland.
- Alison Jane, Mrs. Morby. For services to Older People and to Public Health in West Yorkshire.
- Sarah, Mrs. Moreland, senior advanced skills practitioner, Oaklands College, Hertfordshire. For services to Further Education.
- Roger John Morey. For voluntary service to St. Rocco’s Hospice, Warrington, Cheshire.
- Betty Doris, Mrs. Morley, Keep Fit Teacher. For voluntary service to Physical Activity in Nottingham.
- Christopher Charles John Morrell, teacher and rowing coach, The Windsor Boys' School. For services to School Sport.
- Andrew Morris. For public service.
- Kathryn Margaret, Mrs. Morrison. For services to Inter-Faith Relations in Leicester.
- Isobel Mary, Mrs. Morrow. For services to the community in the Thames Valley.
- Ms Sarah Mower. For services to the Fashion Industry.
- Peter Gerald Muir, senior public financial management adviser, Iraq, Department for International Development.
- Patricia, Mrs. Mullan, access to work adviser, Employment Division, Department for Employment and Learning, Northern Ireland Executive.
- Hilary, Mrs. Mullis, executive officer, Pension, Disability and Carers' Service, Department for Work and Pensions.
- Dr. Isabella Sinclair Munro. For services to the community in Amersham, Buckinghamshire.
- Christopher Munt, chairman, Service User Council, Hertfordshire Partnership NHS Foundation Trust. For services to Mental Healthcare.
- Joseph Murphy, welding instructor, BAE Systems Submarine Solutions. For services to the Defence Industry.
- Robert George Musgrave, Youth and Community Worker, Providence House Christian Centre, London Borough of Wandsworth. For services to Young People.
- Sohail Nawaz, director of Shahbash, Preston. For services to Community Cohesion.
- Teresa, Mrs. Neate, practice educator/adviser, District Nursing, Lansdowne Hospital, Cardiff. For services to Healthcare.
- Edward Neeson. For voluntary service to Young People in Northern Ireland.
- David Newell, schools safety adviser, Chiltern Railways. For services to the Rail Industry.
- David James Newton, engineering specialist, AWE plc. For services to the Defence Industry.
- Peter Charles Smith-Nicholls. For services to Macmillan Cancer Support in Dorset.
- William Charles Nicholls. For services to the community in Heath Town, Wolverhampton, West Midlands.
- Ian Lawrence Northam, project worker, GMB Southern Region. For services to Lifelong Learning.
- David Nunn, community psychiatric nurse, Derbyshire Mental Health Services NHS Trust. For services to Healthcare.
- Malachy John O’Sullivan. For services to the community in Southend-on-Sea, Essex.
- Robin Edgar Norman Oake, Q.P.M. For voluntary service to the Order of St. John in England.
- Sonja Maria, Mrs. Oatley. For services to the community in Staffordshire.
- Pauline Ellen, Mrs. Obee. For charitable services to St. Francis Hospice and Rainbow Trust Children’s Charity in Essex.
- Ms Ann Katherine Oakes-Odger. For services to the Prevention of Knife Crime.
- Margaret, Mrs. Oldham. For services to Disabled People in Lowestoft, Suffolk and Great Yarmouth, Norfolk.
- Joanna Louise Meritta Walters, Mrs. Oliver, director, Global Programmes, Construction Equipment Association. For services to Industry.
- Roger Olley, project manager, Fathers Plus. For services to Families.
- Stephen Neville Osbaldeston, sergeant, Derbyshire Police. For services to the Police.
- Miss Sarah Dilys Outen. For services to Rowing, Conservation and to Charity.
- John Mervyn Owen. For services to Rugby Union.
- Kim, Mrs. Owen, principal construction project manager, Welsh Assembly Government.
- Patricia, Mrs. Oxley. For services to Poetry.
- Ms Namita Panjabi, co-founder, Masala World. For services to the Hospitality Industry.
- Malcolm Brian Paris, chairman, Abbeyfield Brighton and Hove and Abbeyfield Sussex Weald Societies. For services to Older People.
- Michael Park. For voluntary service to the Cockermouth Mountain Rescue Team, Cumbria.
- Colin Parkin, director of facilities, York St. John University. For services to Higher Education.
- Julian Parnall, higher executive officer, Child Support Agency, Department for Work and Pensions.
- Dr. Adrian Parton. For services to Microbiology.
- Bipinchandra Dharamshi Patel, vice-chair of Governors, Working Men’s College, London. For services to Adult and Further Education.
- Charles Brian Patterson. For voluntary service to H.M. Coastguard, Holy Island, Northumberland.
- Geoffrey Denys Paver. For services to the community in Budleigh Salterton, Devon.
- Arthur Brian Payne, administrative officer, Enquiry Unit, Department for Business, Innovation and Skills.
- Matthew Peacock, founder and chief executive, Streetwise Opera. For services to Music and to Homeless People.
- Evelyn Sara, Mrs. Pegley. For voluntary service to the British Red Cross Society in Buckinghamshire.
- Allan Stephen Richard Phillips. For voluntary service to the Sea Cadet Corps in London.
- Shirley Jean, Mrs. Phillips, Co-owner, Cosyhome Insulation Ltd. For services to Sustainable Energy.
- Brian Pike. For services to the Construction Industry.
- Jill Glegge, Mrs. Pilkington, field assistant, Soay Sheep Project, St. Kilda. For services to Science.
- Victor Hector Pinkney. For services to the community in Handsworth, Birmingham.
- Maxine, Mrs. Pittaway, Headteacher, St. Christopher’s School, Wrexham. For services to Special Educational Needs.
- Miss Amanda Poulson, Director’s Support, IMS Live Services, Telford, H.M. Revenue and Customs.
- Catherine Anne, Mrs. Powell. For services to the community in Lytham, Lancashire.
- Mark Powell, Grade C1, Ministry of Defence.
- Trevor Power. For services to Physical Education in Oxfordshire.
- Joanna Margaret, Mrs. Pritchard, co-founder and managing director, Central Surrey Health. For services to Social Enterprise.
- Norma Catherine, Mrs. Procter. For services to the Environment and to the community in Gwaelod Y Garth, Cardiff.
- Peter John Pullan, lately chairman, STAGETEXT. For services to Deaf, Deafened and Hard of Hearing People.
- Caroline, Mrs. Pym. For services to the community in Malmesbury, Wiltshire.
- Ms Gill Raikes, fundraising director, National Trust. For services to Heritage.
- Robert Guy Ramsay. For services to the community in Ponteland, Northumberland.
- Pamela, Mrs. Rew. For services to the Children’s Country Holiday Fund.
- Dr. Frances Jane Rhodes. For services to the Wallich Centre, Cardiff and to Homeless People in Wales.
- Ms Clare Richards, chief executive officer, The Clement James Centre. For services to the community in North Kensington, London.
- Maha, Mrs. Ridha. For services to Muslim Women.
- Caroline Elizabeth, Mrs. Riley, administrative officer, Jobcentre Plus, Department for Work and Pensions.
- Sandra Kaye, Mrs. Riley. speech and language therapist. For services to Richard Cloudesley School, London Borough of Islington.
- Helen, Mrs. Rimmer. For services to the community in Ashton Hayes, Cheshire.
- Rhoda, Mrs. Robb, Lecturer, Horticulture with Science, South Eastern Regional College, Bangor. For services to Further Education in Northern Ireland.
- Andrew Roberts, lately sector manager, East Kent, Maritime and Coastguard Agency, Department for Transport.
- Charmian, Mrs. Roberts, head of Business Development, National Education Partnership. For services to Education.
- Dr. Dewi Wyn Roberts, chairman, Community Justice Interventions Wales. For services to the community in North Wales.
- Michael Guist Roberts, chairman, English Wine Producers. For services to the Drinks Industry.
- Bernard Robinson, lately operational development manager, health and safety executive, Department for Work and Pensions.
- Nicola Helen, Mrs. Robinson, Grade C2, Ministry of Defence.
- Miss Sandra Jane Robinson, Lord Mayor’s principal officer, Belfast City Council. For services to Local Government in Northern Ireland.
- Sheila, Mrs. Robinson. For services to Agriculture in the North West.
- James Robson. For services to Business in the North East.
- Joseph Thomas Roper. For services to the community in Blaby, Leicestershire.
- Professor Sheila Rowan, director, Institute for Gravitational Research. For services to Science.
- Graham John Russell, chief executive, Local Better Regulation Office. For services to Business and to Consumers.
- Thomas Sale. For voluntary service to Rugby League in Leigh, Lancashire.
- Morris Oliver Samuels, founder, Unity Project. For services to Young People in Nottingham through Sport.
- Glenis, Mrs. Sanderson. For services to the Victim Support Service in Teesside.
- Ann, Mrs. Sankey. For voluntary service to the Church Lads' and Church Girls' Brigade in Leicestershire.
- Raymond Michael Satur. For services to Local Government in Sheffield.
- William John Saunders, chairman, Good Companions of Holywell Hospital. For services to Healthcare in North Wales.
- Beryl Daphne, Mrs. Scott. For services to Padnell Infant School and to the community in Hampshire.
- Diana Mackay, Mrs. Scott. For services to the community in Stone, Staffordshire.
- Lily Gillespie, Mrs. Scott. For services to Counselling in Fife.
- Nigel Christopher Alford Searle, train service development manager, Southern Railway. For services to the Rail Industry.
- Miss Linda Selby, co-founder, Work Experience Programme for Teenagers with Learning Disabilities. For services to Special Educational Needs.
- Paul Anthony Selfe, production engineering team manager, Ultra Electronics. For services to the Defence Industry.
- Ms Katherine Gillespie-Sells. For services to Disabled Lesbian, Gay, Bisexual and Transgender People.
- Saroj Bala, Mrs. Seth. For services to Community Cohesion in Leicester.
- John Frederick Shave. For services to Neighbourhood Watch in Dorset.
- Thomas William Shearer, head of Community Wellbeing, East Lothian Council. For services to Local Government.
- Jennifer Ann, Mrs. Shelton. For services to the community in West Yorkshire.
- Ms Hilary Short. For voluntary service to West Yorkshire Police.
- Audrey Elizabeth, Mrs. Simmons, foster carer, Lincolnshire County Council. For services to Families.
- John Noel Simmons, foster carer, Lincolnshire County Council. For services to Families.
- Ian Graham Simpson. For services to the College of Pharmacy Practice and to the Guild of Healthcare Pharmacists.
- Miss Amrit Kumati Dhigpal Kaur Singh, artist. For services to the Indian Miniature Tradition of Painting.
- Miss Rabindra Kumati Dhigpal Kaur Singh, artist. For services to the Indian Miniature Tradition of Painting.
- Daniel Henry Sinton, deputy principal of Energy Division, Department of Enterprise, Trade and Investment, Northern Ireland Executive.
- Miss Sarah Skedd. For voluntary service to H.M. Prison Coldingley, Surrey.
- David Skingsley. For services to the Royal Mail and to the community in Chester.
- Margaret Edith, Mrs. Skinner. For voluntary service to St. John Ambulance in Sussex.
- Jean Yvonne, Mrs. Slade. For services to Breast Cancer Patients in West Wales.
- Vivienne Maud, Mrs. Slater. For voluntary service to the Bevin Boys' Association.
- Dr. Richard Ernest George Sloan, lately general medical practitioner, West Yorkshire. For services to Healthcare.
- June, Mrs. Small. For services to Food Producing Businesses in the South West.
- Cheryl Christina Kelton, Mrs. Smart, chief executive, Luton and Bedfordshire Chamber of Commerce. For services to Business.
- Emily, Mrs. Millington Smith. For services to Older People and to Carers in East Anglia.
- Dr. Geoffrey Charles Smith, chairman, Bath and Bristol Royal Institution Mathematics Masterclasses. For services to Education.
- Howard Smith, placement manager, North Yorkshire County Council. For services to Local Government.
- Irene, Mrs. Smith. For services to Washington Citizens' Advice Bureau in Tyne and Wear.
- Mary Ann, Mrs. Smith. For services to the community in Troqueer, Dumfries and Galloway.
- Peterina Moffat, Mrs. Smith. For services to Community Housing in Dundee.
- Veronica Ann, Mrs. Snowling, J.P. For services to the community in St. Helens, Merseyside.
- Dr. Marcus Jayant Solanki. For services to the community in Leicester.
- Michael Sommers. For public service.
- John Arthur Speak, retained watch manager, Humberside Fire and Rescue Service. For services to Local Government.
- Allan Kincade Spencer, lately immigration liaison manager, International Group, UK Border Agency, Home Office.
- Karen, Mrs. Spencer. For services to the agricultural community in Monmouthshire.
- Ms Leigh Spiers, lately director of volunteering, Art Fund. For services to the Arts.
- Alan Leslie Victor Squirrell. For voluntary service to Norfolk Credit Union.
- Terry Stacy. For services to the Housing Sector in London.
- Michael John Staff. For services to the Abbeyfield Society and to the community in East Sussex.
- Judith Mary, Lady Steel of Aikwood. For services to the Theatre in the Scottish Borders.
- Edwin John Stevens. For services to the City of London Corporation and to the Voluntary Sector.
- Christine, Mrs. Hamilton Stewart. For voluntary service to Marie Curie Cancer Care in Bradford, West Yorkshire.
- Dr. Robert Christopher Stockdale. For charitable services in the West Midlands.
- Eric Stockdale, laboratory assistant, Roads Service, Department for Regional Development, Northern Ireland Executive.
- Barbara, Mrs. Stone, Family Justice Council administrator and family business manager, H.M. Courts and Tribunals Service, Ministry of Justice.
- Edward Charles Stretton, usher, Supreme Court of the United Kingdom.
- Dorothy, Mrs. Struthers. For voluntary service to the Royal Star and Garter Home, Richmond, Surrey.
- Miss June Ann Stubbs, chair, The Thorney Island Society. For services to Conservation in the City of Westminster.
- David Stuttard. For charitable services to St. Dunstan’s and in Ghana.
- James Montgomery Summers, lead tutor, Institution of Railway Operators. For services to the Railway Industry.
- Adrienne, Mrs. Sussman. For voluntary service to Young People in Israel and through the Scouts.
- Terence Suthers. For services to Heritage and Museums in Yorkshire and Humberside.
- George Henry Taggart, J.P. For services to the Boys' Brigade in Northern Ireland.
- Karen, Mrs. Tait, company secretary, Orkney Livestock Association. For services to Farming.
- Pamela Helen, Mrs. Talbot. For services to the National Oceanography Centre, Southampton.
- Cherron, Mrs. Inko-Tariah, senior policy adviser, Big Society Programme Team, Department for Communities and Local Government.
- Debra Pauline, Mrs. Taylor, executive officer, Jobcentre Plus, Department for Work and Pensions.
- Dennis Taylor. For services to Local Government and to the community in Lancashire.
- Lily, Mrs. Taylor. For services to the community in Sunderland, Tyne and Wear.
- Mary Gladys, Mrs. Taylor, lately chairman, Brecon Beacons National Park Authority. For services to the Environment in Mid-Wales.
- Peter Richard Taylor, mobile police station officer, Derbyshire Constabulary. For services to the Police.
- Veronica, Mrs. Taylor, payment strategy/business change manager, Shipley, H.M. Revenue and Customs.
- Sheila Ann, Mrs. Taylor, chief executive, Safe and Sound Charity, Derby. For services to Children.
- Stephen Taylor, teacher, Greenwood Academy, North Ayrshire. For services to Schools Chess.
- Ms Pauline Teddy. For services to Young People in Southmead, Bristol.
- David Gwyn Thomas, Grade D, Ministry of Defence.
- Susan Dawn, Mrs. Thomas. For charitable services in Wakefield, West Yorkshire.
- Chief Charles Coblah Cheata Thompson. For services to the Black Film Industry.
- Judith Elizabeth, Mrs. Thompson, lately chair, board of trustees, Pre-school Learning Alliance. For services to Families.
- Joan Constance, Mrs. Thomson. For services to the community in Cheltenham, Gloucestershire.
- Dorothy, Mrs. Thornhill. For services to Local Government in Watford, Hertfordshire.
- Margaret Elizabeth, Mrs. Titmuss. For public service.
- Karen Lorraine, Mrs. Todd. For public service.
- Rabbi Dr. Chanan Tomlin. For services to Education and to the Jewish community in Manchester and London.
- John Leslie Townend, communication support worker, Rampton Hospital, Nottinghamshire Healthcare NHS Trust. For services to Deaf People.
- Megan Dorothy Ivy, Mrs. Traice. For services to the community in Bexhill-on-Sea, East Sussex.
- Patricia, Mrs. Trembath. For services to the community in Sydenham, London Borough of Lewisham.
- Gary Trew. For services to People with Special Needs in Northern Ireland.
- Dr. Christopher Upton, co-founder, Poole Branch of Diabetes UK. For services to Healthcare.
- Miss Christella Vasili, ministerial support officer, Ministerial and Communications Group, H.M. Treasury.
- Susan, Mrs. Vincent, head of Disability Employment Solutions, Birmingham City Council. For services to Local Government.
- Ms Jill Voller, higher officer, Business Change, Excise and Customs, Southend-on-Sea, H.M. Revenue and Customs.
- Anne Elizabeth, Mrs. Wade. For services to the community in Rochester, Kent.
- Richard John Wagstaff, lately managing ranger, Afan Forest Park, Neath Port Talbot. For services to the Tourist Industry in Neath Port Talbot.
- Regina, Mrs. Waldman. For charitable services in Leeds, West Yorkshire.
- Cecil Walker. For services to Cricket in Northern Ireland.
- Jean, Mrs. Walker. For services to Older People in Bradford, West Yorkshire.
- Michael Wallace. For voluntary service to the National Railway Museum.
- Miriam, Mrs. Wallington. For services to Rural Affairs and to Agriculture.
- Christopher Henry Walton. For services to the community in Oxford.
- Dr. Allen Warren, senior lecturer, Department of History and founder, York Students in Schools, University of York. For services to Higher Education.
- Dr. Susan Mary Waterworth, forensic medical examiner, Durham Constabulary. For services to the Police.
- Alan Watson, B.E.M. For services to Young People in Durham.
- Dr. Andrew William Watson. For public service.
- Valerie, Mrs. Watson, Crown Court manager, H.M. Courts and Tribunals Service, Ministry of Justice.
- Ms Judith Webb. For services to Conservation in England and Wales.
- Timothy Gerald Webb, founder, Oily Cart Theatre. For services to Drama for Children with Special Needs.
- Jonathan Philip Millward Webber, director of international trade and development, Birmingham Chamber of Commerce and Industry. For services to Business.
- Miss Nichola Jane Webber. For services to Road Safety.
- Margaret, Mrs. Wellock, lately president, Morecambe Division, Girlguiding Association. For services to Young People.
- Oonagh, Mrs. Werngren, head of Development, GDF Suez-Exploration and Production. For services to the Oil and Gas Industries.
- Alan Paul West, chief executive, Exscitec. For services to Science, Technology, Engineering and Mathematics Education.
- Graham Richard Westcott. For services to the Road Transport Industry.
- Leo Joseph Westhead, engineering development manager, RAF Fylingdales, Serco Group plc. For services to the Defence Industry.
- Diana Emmerson, Mrs. Wharton, practice nurse, Ministry of Defence.
- Elizabeth Ann, Mrs. White. For voluntary service to the Cloud 9 Charity in Gloucestershire.
- Kenneth James White. For services to Lifesaving through the Royal Life Saving Society.
- Maria, Mrs. Whitehead, director, Hawkshead Relish Company Ltd. For services to the Food Industry in Cumbria.
- Mark Richard Whitehead, director, Hawkshead Relish Company Ltd. For services to the Food Industry in Cumbria.
- Suzanne Cecilia, Mrs. Whitewood. For services to the community in the Isle of Wight.
- Carole, Mrs. Whittingham. For services to Support and Care after Road Death and the Campaign against Drinking and Driving.
- William John Wilding, head forester, Clinton Devon Estates. For services to the Environment.
- Roger John Willey, lately station manager, Cornwall Fire and Rescue Service. For services to the community in Mullion.
- Cuthbert Hugh Williams. For voluntary service to Black and Minority Ethnic People in Brighton and Hove.
- Eifion Williams, director of finance, Abertawe Bro Morgannwg University Health Board. For services to the NHS in Wales.
- Janet Mary, Mrs. Williams. For charitable services to Breast Cancer Patients in Powys.
- Linda Mary, Mrs. Williams, executive officer, Pension, Disability and Carers' Service, Department for Work and Pensions.
- Brian Conn Wilson, drum major. For voluntary service to Music in Northern Ireland.
- Gerald Bernard Wilson, airport duty manager, Belfast International Airport. For services to the Aviation Industry.
- Terry Denise, Mrs. Wilson, head of Keppel Unit, H.M. Young Offenders' Institution, Wetherby, West Yorkshire, Ministry of Justice.
- William Macpherson Wilson. For services to the Arts in Caithness.
- Alison, Mrs. Winks. For voluntary service to the British Malignant Hyperthermia Association.
- Karen Jean, Mrs. Heppleston Winn. For services to Special Needs and Elderly People in Greater Manchester.
- John Frank Winnard, director, William Santus & Co Ltd. (Uncle Joe’s Mint Balls). For services to the Confectionery Trade in the North West.
- William Wisden, photographer. For services to Art.
- Janet, Mrs. Wood. For services to the community in the Uley area of Stroud, Gloucestershire.
- Sandra Ann, Mrs. Wooledge, director, East Berkshire Business Partnership. For services to Education.
- Anne, Mrs. Wright. For services to the community in Oldham, Greater Manchester.
- Kenneth Wright. For services to the community in Oldham, Greater Manchester.
- Audrey Caroline Ann, Mrs. Wynne. For voluntary service to Paulton Memorial Hospital, Somerset.
- Terence George Wynne. For voluntary service to Paulton Memorial Hospital, Somerset.
- Doreen Marie, Mrs. Yate For voluntary service to the Samaritans in Pendle, Burnley and Rossendale, Lancashire.
- Elizabeth Jean, Mrs. Young. For services to Young People in Perth and Kinross.

== Australia ==
The Queen's Birthday Honours 2011 for Australia were announced on 13 June 2011.

== Barbados ==
The Queen's Birthday Honours List for 2011 was announced in the London Gazette on 10 June 2011

=== Knight Bachelor ===
- Professor Emeritus Woodville Kemble Marshall. For services to Education.

=== The Most Excellent Order of The British Empire ===
Civil Division

==== Commander of The Order of The British Empire (CBE) ====
- The Most Reverend Dr the Honourable John Walder
- Dunlop Holder. For services to Religion.
- Ms Teresa Ann Marshall. For services to the Foreign Service.
- Everton Gay Walters. For services to the Maritime industry.

==== Member of The Order of The British Empire (MBE) ====
- Lieutenant Colonel Atheline Deighncourte Cynthia Branch. For services to the Military.
- Norman St. Tomburn Howard. For services to business.

== Grenada ==
The Queen's Birthday Honours List for 2011 was announced in the London Gazette on 10 June 2011

=== The Most Excellent Order of The British Empire ===
==== Commander of The Order of The British Empire (CBE) ====
Civil Division

- Hugh DOLLAND. For services to business.

==== Member of The Order of The British Empire (MBE) ====
- Beryl Lucina, Mrs. ISAAC. For public service.

=== Queen's Police Medal (QPM) ===
- Superintendent Anthony JOSEPH. For services to the State (Police).

== Papua New Guinea ==
The Queen's Birthday Honours List for 2011 was announced in the London Gazette on 10 June 2011

=== Knights Bachelor ===
- Wasangula Noel Levi, C.B.E., M.P. For services to public administration in his former roles of Minister of State, senior public servant and diplomat and secretary general of the Pacific Forum.
- John Ralston Wild, C.B.E. For services to commerce, particularly in air transport and tourism, and to the community and for humanitarian endeavours.

=== The Most Distinguished Order of Saint Michael and Saint George ===
==== Companion of The Order of Saint Michael and Saint George (CMG) ====
- The Honourable Andrew Kumbakor, M.P. For service to the community as a member of National Parliament and Minister of State.
- Erna Kathleen, Mrs. Pita. For services to the community and to the advancement of women’s status and welfare.

=== The Most Excellent Order of The British Empire ===
==== Commander of The Order of The British Empire (CBE) ====
(Civil Division)

- Gari Liborius Baki, O.B.E. For services to the community and to the Royal Papua New Guinea Constabulary.
- The Honourable Peter Humphrey, M.P. For services to the community, as a member of National Parliament and as Governor of West New Britain.
- Charles Watson Lepani, O.B.E. For services to public administration and to the diplomatic service, including his appointment as High Commissioner in Australia.
- Matthew Tjoeng. For services to agricultural development and sustainable forestry.

Military Division

- Brigadier General Francis Wanji Agwi, O.B.E., Papua New Guinea Defence Force.

==== Officer of The Order of The British Empire (OBE) ====
- Doctor Umadevi Ambihaipahar. For services to the community, to mental health and to traditional medicine.
- Ni, Mrs. Cragnolini. For services to commerce, sports administration and to the community.
- Neville Henry Howcroft. For services to eco-forestry and to the conservation of commercial tree species.
- Richard Nelson Maru. For services to development banking and to rural development.
- The Reverend Father Patrick McIndoe. For services to the Catholic Church and to the community of Sandaun Province.
- Ricky Moke Mitio. For services to the community and to the coffee industry.
- Stephen Mokis. For services to public administration and to New Ireland Provincial Government.
- Frederick Sheekiot, Q.P.M. For services to the community and to the Royal Papua New Guinea Constabulary.
- Doctor. Robin Sios. For services to the community, to healthcare and to hospital administration.
- Akuila Tubal. For public service in the East New Britain Provincial Administration.
- John Wauwia. For services to education, to radio broadcasting and to the community of East Sepik.

Military Division

- Colonel Joseph Fabila, M.B.E., Papua New Guinea Defence Force.

==== Member of The Order of The British Empire (MBE) ====
- Ian Andrew Chow. For services to commerce and to the community.
- Igo Daure. For services to the community and to the United Church.
- Chief Inspector Cathy Dobb, Papua New Guinea Constabulary.
- Robert IanHowden. For services to commerce and to the Scouts Movement.
- Guwi Kambi. For services to the community and to rural healthcare.
- Alphonse Krau. For services to the community.
- Anthony Kundila. For services to the community.
- Ms Kay Wakerley Liddle. For services to the community, to the Bible Society and to religion.
- Aravapo Lohia. For services to air transport and to Air Niugini.
- Moses Makis. For public service in the New Ireland Provincial Administration.
- David Kym Mitchell. For services to agriculture and the environment among rural communities.
- Kandaso Napi. For services to the community and to business development.
- Simon Passingan. For services to the rural community.
- Gerard Phillip. For services to the community, to Air Transport and to Sport.
- Graham Pople. For services to rural development and communities.
- Wayne Leslie Satchell. For services to the community and to Cricket.
- Awan Sete. For services to the Royal Papua New Guinea Constabulary.
- Lahui Tau. For services to the community.
- Sebulon Tovaira. For public service in the Department of Defence.
- Alois Chris Valuka. For services to the community and to local government.
- Russell Waibauru. For services to the community and rural development.
- John Warbat. For services to Music as Composer, Singer and Instrumentalist.
- The Reverend Dondoli Wawe. For services to the community and to Religion.
- Julius Yeoh. For services to the Rubber and Agricultural industries.

Military Division

- Commander (N) Michael David, Papua New Guinea Defence Force.
- Lieutenant Colonel Michael Augustine Daniel, Papua New Guinea Defence Force.
- Lieutenant Colonel Michael Kumun, Papua New Guinea Defence Force.

=== Imperial Service Order ===
- Tommy Nahuet. For public service.
- David Naon. For public service.

=== British Empire Medal ===
Civil Division

- Dominic Bre. For services to the community.
- Michael Sigoho Buka. For services to Oil Palm development.
- Nancy, Mrs. Dabada. For public service.
- Peter Du. For services to the community.
- John Hinalu. For services to the community.
- Mavis, Mrs. Holland. For services to the Police Force.
- Clare, Mrs. Ivia. For services to the Police Force.
- Juliana, Mrs. Jiki. For services to rural healthcare.
- Alois Rokoa Kanakana. For public service.
- Avosa Kave. For services to Education.
- Helen, Mrs. Kavo. For public service.
- Peter Nere Kupo. For services to Education.
- Timothy Laemeta. For public service.
- Timothy Meria Lapeya. For services to the community.
- Ding Mathew. For services to Government House.
- The Reverend Mondopa Mini. For services to the PNG Bible Church.
- Joseph Muna. For public service.
- Giyame Mashleen Nagwi. For public service.
- Yaku Nolepo. For services to the community.
- Joseph Panu. For services to the community.
- Arimax Magabe Peyape. For services to the community.
- Bothen Pusembo. For public service.
- Paias Puwa. For services to the Catholic Church.
- Michael Sau. For public service.
- Yori, Mrs. Sauna. For services to the Police Force.
- Araga Dikana, Mrs. Sere. For services to Education.
- Gitene Somole. For services to the community.
- Elijah Taksir. For services to the community.
- Joyce, Mrs. Talibe. For service to rural healthcare.
- Imbi Tanda. For services to Education.
- Janet Diribu, Mrs. Telabe. For services to the community.
- Kee Tine. For services to the community.
- Walter Unam. For services to the community.
- Richard Warea. For public service.
- Edward Yaliui. For services to rural healthcare.

Military Division

- Warrant Officer Steven Narimonda, Papua New Guinea Defence Force.
- Warrant Officer Jonah Pomeleu, Papua New Guinea Defence Force.
- Chief Warrant Officer Dick Roy, Papua New Guinea Defence Force.
- Warrant Officer Francis Tule, Papua New Guinea Defence Force.
- Warrant Officer Michael Taram Valuka, Papua New Guinea Defence Force.

=== Queen's Police Medal (QPM) ===
- Chief Superintendent Wini Henao, Royal Papua New Guinea Constabulary.
- Chief Superintendent Fred Yeis Yakasa, Royal Papua New Guinea Constabulary.
- Superintendent Donald Yamasombi, Royal Papua New Guinea Constabulary.

== Solomon Islands ==
The Queen's Birthday Honours List for 2011 was announced in the London Gazette on 10 June 2011

=== The Most Excellent Order of The British Empire ===
Civil Division

==== Officer of The Order of The British Empire (OBE) ====
- Senda Fifi’i. For services to Community Development, Public Service and to Government.

==== Member of The Order of The British Empire (MBE) ====
- Assistant Commissioner PeterAoraunisaka. For services to the Royal Solomon Islands Police Force and to the Community.

=== British Empire Media ===
Civil Division

- Sergeant Jonathan Ben, Royal Solomon Islands Police Force.
- Sergeant Mary Wale Bennett, Royal Solomon Islands Police Force.
- Superintendent Daniel Gideon Hunikera. For services to the Community and to the Royal Solomon Islands Police Force.
- Inspector Cedar Bea Nevol, Royal Solomon Islands Police Force.
- Superintendent Lence Rina, Royal Solomon Islands Police Force.

== Tuvalu ==
The Queen's Birthday Honours List for 2011 was announced in the London Gazette on 10 June 2011

=== The Most Excellent Order of The British Empire ===
==== Member of The Order of The British Empire (MBE) ====
- Ms Eleni Tapumanaia. For Public and Community Service.

== Saint Lucia ==
The Queen's Birthday Honours List for 2011 was announced in the London Gazette on 10 June 2011

=== The Most Excellent Order of The British Empire ===
Civil Division

==== Commander of The Order of The British Empire (CBE) ====
- Michael Bruce GarnetGordon. For services to the Legal Profession and to National Development.

==== Officer of The Order of The British Empire (OBE) ====
- Dr. Jonathan Romel Daniel. For services to Medicine.
- Professor Hazel Christine Myrtle Simmons-McDonald. For services to Education and Educational Leadership.

==== Member of The Order of The British Empire (MBE) ====
- Doctor Ethlyn Marie Angella Gradison-Didier. For services to Medicine and to Health Education.
- Girard Glace. For services to business.

=== British Empire Medal ===
Civil Division

- Henry Flemonce Annelle. For services to Education and the community.
- Nahum J. N. Baptiste. For services to the Health Sector and to Culture.
- Arnold Clouden. For services to the community and to Sport.
- Priscillus Simeon. For services to Community Development.

== Antigua and Barbuda ==
The Queen's Birthday Honours List for 2011 was announced in the London Gazette on 10 June 2011

=== The Most Excellent Order of The British Empire ===
==== Member of The Order of The British Empire (MBE) ====
- Eustace Wilfred Hill. For services to Education.
