= Katongo =

Katongo Temba, known mononymously as Katongo or "KT", is a Zambian-born British singer, songwriter and model. Her genre of music is Afropop.

== Early life ==
Katongo Tembo was born in Mufulira, Zambia, to Bemba parents, Fredah and Nelson Temba. Aged 11 Katongo and her family moved to Hertfordshire, England. In England she attended Primary School and then went on to attend John Henry Newman Catholic Secondary School in Stevenage. She was a Catholic in Mufulira, Zambia following her parents. She liked participating in dancing at church at small age.

Katongo later obtained a Bachelor of Science degree in International Politics at Brunel University.

== Music ==
In 2012, Katongo released her debut EP 'My Way' in 2012. The EP was released on iTunes and from it she released her first single 'Tonight'. This was accompanied by a music video which was played on Channel O, ZNBC TV, Muvi TV and Vox Africa TV. The single peaked at number 17 on German music chart Oljo. The single also received considerable radio play on radio stations in the UK, Africa and North America.

In 2013, Katongo took part in Simon Cowell's, You Generation online Talent search. Katongo's audition, titled Kat's audition on YouTube, was broadcast across the world and went viral within a few days. Katongo is signed as a songwriter to Music Publishing company SPEEGRA UK. In 2014, Katongo released her first Zambian vernacular single "Joy". This features J.K. The single peaked at number 7 on Beat99FM Nigeria and has received airplay across the African continent in nightclubs and on radio and television.

In December 2014, Katongo was announced as a winner of the Songwriting Contest UK. Her song "Make A Change" was described by judges as "an infectious and catchy reggae song with a positive message".

Katongo has also been featured in several magazines and newspapers. In 2015 she featured on the cover of the Bulletin and Record Magazine May Issue.

Katongo has performed across the UK and has collaborated with various artists including popular artists from Zambia including J.K, Cactus Agony, Slapdee, BM Cleo Ice Queen and producer Shom-C.

Katongo released her new single "Baba" on June 15, 2015.

Katongo wrote "I am Back Again" in 2015. Katongo released her new single "All Over Me". This song enjoyed radio airplay in the UK (Kiss FM, Rinse FM, Reprezent Radio), Australia, US and across over 140 radio stations worldwide. In addition to her solo project, Katongo collaborated with the reggae artist, Cactus Agony, on a song called "Kiss of Life". "Kiss Of Life" peaked at Number 7 on the MTV Base music video charts.

Alongside her music, Katongo enjoys doing charity work and has been aligned with the charity ‘Africans Unite Against Child Abuse’ (AFRUCA). Recognised as a supporter of the charity, Katongo alongside other speakers, has spoken at the House of Commons on two occasions.

Furthermore, Katongo is also an international model and has appeared in music videos and adverts, as well as beauty and entertainment magazines (Cocogal UK, Poize Magazine Nigeria, Promota Magazine and EZM).

In 2018, Katongo released a new single called "Tinofara" featuring Slap Dee. This is the first release from her upcoming debut album. "Tinofara" was playlisted on different radio stations in Zambia, Nigeria, Ghana and the United Kingdom. "Tinofara" was selected by the BBC for the BBC Introducing platform and Katongo was invited for an interview and to showcase the song on BBC Radio. In 2019. Katongo released a new single called "Once in a Life Time".

== Modelling ==
Katongo started modelling in 2010 when she participated in and won a title at the 'Miss African Spirit' Beauty pageant UK. She went on to feature in music videos and magazines and TV adverts. In 2014, Katongo signed a modelling contract with Black Afro Queens Agency in the UK.
