= MT Carney =

- Born: Dunoon, Scotland
- Occupation: Marketing executive
- Website: http://mtcarney.com

Marie Therese Carney or MT Carney is a Scottish-born American marketing executive. She is the founder and CEO of the marketing firm Untitled Worldwide. She is the former President of Marketing for Walt Disney Studios, and also co-founder of Naked Communications and of the British nail salon chain Nails Inc.

== Early life ==
Born in Dunoon, Scotland, Carney studied French literature at the Sorbonne in Paris.

== Career ==
Carney began her career in the media department of Ogilvy and Mather in London. After working at London's Leo Burnett she spent six years as an account planner for the former Ammirati Puris Lintas.

=== Nails Inc. ===
In 1999, Carney co-founded British nail salon chain Nails Inc. with Thea Green. On trips to Manhattan, Green and Carney had noticed that soon after landing in the U.S., UK women tended to visit nail salons for quick, inexpensive manicures. After conducting consumer research to confirm consumer demand in Britain, the pair raised £250,000 in private funding and in November 1999 opened their first store on South Molton Street in the West End of London. Soon after they opened four additional stores. The chain has since expanded to 60 locations and is the U.K.'s largest nail salon chain. In 2012 the company recorded sales at £21.7m, and expanded into Brazil, Australia, Mexico and South Africa.

In 2001, Carney left Nails Inc. to move to the United States. She began her U.S. career in New York as Worldwide Planning Director for Ogilvy and Mather.

=== Naked Communications ===
In 2006, Carney co-founded Naked Communications in America.

=== Disney ===
In 2010, Carney took a role as the President of Marketing for Walt Disney Studios, responsible for marketing and distribution for Walt Disney Pictures, Walt Disney Animation Studios, Pixar Animation Studios and Touchstone Pictures. While Carney was able to change Disney's marketing approach, she had difficulty as an outsider in Hollywood's creative and marketing communities, and was dogged by rumors that her future with Disney was not secure. In 2012, Carney left Disney in order to spend more time with her children in New York, whom she had regularly flown to see on weekends.

=== Untitled Worldwide ===
Carney then founded Untitled Worldwide, a marketing firm based in New York City. She serves as its CEO.
