= Bill Parfitt =

British businessman

Christopher William Parfitt, a Commander of the Order of the British Empire (CBE), is the former chairman and managing director of General Motors UK Ltd.

== Biography ==
Christopher William Parfitt is an engineer by training. He ended his career with Goodyear in 1972, where he oversaw the initiation and operation of their Fast Fit operations. He then went on to work for several companies, including Dorada, Sears, Lex, and Henlys.

In 1998, Parfitt joined General Motors, becoming the automobile manufacturer's fleet sales director. He went onto hold various positions at General Motors, including sales and marketing director, managing director, and regional director overseeing the GM brands Saab, Chevrolet, Cadillac, Corvette, Hummer, and Opel Ireland, and fleet and LCV sales in Europe.

Following his tenure as chairman & managing director for GM UK, Parfitt retired from the position. However, he continued to contribute his expertise to GM UK through temporary senior roles and acting as a consultant.

In recognition of his contributions, Parfitt was honored as Commander of the Order of the British Empire (CBE) during the 2011 Birthday Honours.
