= Beverly Lindsay =

Dame Beverly Isadore Lindsay DBE OBE OD DL
- Born: St. Thomas, Jamaica

Dame Beverly Isadore Lindsay runs a travel agency in Birmingham and is a community worker. She was appointed a D.B.E. and an O.B.E. by the British Government and an O.D. by the Government of Jamaica. She was the first Afro-Caribbean woman to be a D.L. of West Midlands and the first woman V.L.L. of West Midlands. She is the chair of the Association of Jamaican Nationals UK.

== Early life ==
Lindsay was born in St. Thomas, Jamaica. She migrated to Handsworth in Birmingham as a teenager in 1964 to complete her secondary education.

== Career ==
She worked as a nurse and midwife, then worked as a senior community officer in Handsworth and in financial services.

In 1987, she founded Diamond Travel, an independent travel agency, on Dudley Road in Winson Green and Ladywood, which helps families return to the Caribbean. It has been a member of the Elite Travel consortium since 1999. She remains as CEO.

== Civic work ==
She founded and is chair of the Association of Jamaican Nationals in Birmingham.

She joined the Rotary Club of Birmingham in 1997, was named "Paul Harris Fellow" in 2009 and served as president in 2012–2013. She was the first Black woman to serve as president.

She is a member of the Greater Birmingham Chamber of Commerce's Chamber Council and Global Chamber committee. She was presented the President's Medal in 2022.

She has been a governor of King Edward VI Handsworth Wood Girls' Academy for over 30 years, and is chair of the trust. She is a former trustee of King Solomon International Business School. She is a patron of three charities: Bethel Health and Healing Network, SHAPE Hostel, and The Feast, which she became a patron of in 2019.

== Honours and awards ==
She was appointed an Officer of the Order of the British Empire in the 2011 Birthday Honours for "services to Business and to the community of Birmingham". She was appointed a Dame of the British Empire in the 2026 Birthday Honours for "services to the West Midlands and to Charity".

She was appointed an Order of Distinction by the Government of Jamaica in 2008 for service to Jamaica and the diaspora.

She was appointed a Deputy Lieutenant of the West Midlands on 4 November 2013, and was the first Afro-Caribbean woman appointed to the role, which she served in for 10 years. She was also appointed the Vice Lord-Lieutenant of the West Midlands in July 2017, and was the first woman appointed to the role.

She was awarded an honorary Doctorate of Letters from Aston University on 20 July 2017. She was awarded an honorary doctorate from Birmingham City University on 27 July 2017 for her nursing, midwifery and travel work, as well as her community involvement. She was awarded an honorary degree of Doctor of Humane Letters from the University of the Commonwealth Caribbean on 19 July 2026.

In 1998, she received an Excellence Award from the Federation of Black Women Business Owners. In 2002, she was named best businesswoman at 3b's (Black Business in Birmingham) annual enterprise excellence gala. She is also a 3b board director. She was an honouree of the Reach Society in 2020.

== Personal life ==
She lives in Birmingham. She is a Christian, and a member of the New Testament Church of God, Handsworth. She likes reading crime novels, as well as cooking and baking. She became a single mother in her teens, and, by age 20, she was a single mum of two sons.
