= Nails Inc. =

English nail polish company

Nails.INC
- Type: Nail polish brand
- Industry: Retail
- Founded: 1999
- Founder: Thea Green, MT Carney
- Headquarters: London, England
- Area served: United Kingdom, United States, Australia, Japan
- Key people: Thea Green
- Revenue: £14M
- Number of employees: 98
- Website: www.nailsinc.com

Nails Inc. is a London, England-based nail polish company founded by Thea Green MBE.

== Thea Green ==
Thea Green was born and brought up in Hoylake on the Wirral Peninsula, near Liverpool. Her father was a company director of Littlewoods, and her mother a housewife. She completed a degree in public relations and journalism at the London College of Fashion. While studying, she assisted on the fashion desk at the Daily Mail newspaper, and then Tatler magazine. Joining Tatler as fashion co-ordinator on graduation, she became fashion editor aged 24.

Green was appointed Member of the Order of the British Empire (MBE) in the 2011 Birthday Honours for services to the beauty industry.

== History ==
Green noticed on travelling to New York City, the number of nail bars that were easily available. Working on a business plan with business partner MT Carney, they raised £200,000 through investors, and launched their first store in 1999 in South Molton Street in the West End of London.

After opening the first three stores in London, as the business expanded Carney left the business with her family for the United States.

In 2000, Nails Inc. opened department store concessions.

In 2003, the company launched their training academy for beauty therapists in London. In 2005 they launched the luxury "champagne nail bar."

== Present ==
Nails Inc. is a homegrown, British nail brand. The company has concessions within key retailers, including Selfridges, John Lewis, Waitrose, QVC, Amazon and Look Fantastic, as well as Sephora, Target and Sallys in the USA.

The company now has stores in the UK, US, Australia, and Japan.

In November 2012, Nails.INC opened a nail bar in the Harvey Nichols Beauty Bazaar - a concept store located in the Liverpool One shopping centre, in the centre of Liverpool.

In December 2014, Victoria Beckham collaborated with the brand to launch two limited edition nail polishes. In 2015, Nails.Inc launched what they claimed to be the world's first spray on nail polish.

In June 2020, Nails Inc. posted a message with its 240,000 followers on Instagram: Nails.INC will contribute proceeds for the whole month of June to Black Lives Matter. "We stand with the fight against systematic racism," the beauty brand shared on the 1 June post.

In May 2022, Nails Inc. collaborated with Magnum to launch chocolate-scented nail polishes inspired by the new ice cream Duet Bars. The line featured three sets of two polishes to match the three flavours, Almond, Chocolate and Cookie. In December 2022, they collaborated with Marks & Spencer to launch a Percy Pig collection.

In March 2025, Nails Inc. launched It's Topless, the first ever 4-in-1 nail polish. Combining base coat, colour, top coat and treatment all in one, the range launched with 22 shades. In December 2025, they collaborated with Jo Loves to launch a limited edition set containing a fragrance pen and a red nail polish.

== Awards ==
- 2002 CEW Achiever Award
- 2011 Awarded MBE (Member of the Order of the British Empire)
- 2011 Ernst and Young Entrepreneur of the Year
- 2011 First Women Awards Retail & Consumer Winner
- 2019 Allure Best of Beauty Award
- 2025 Allure Best of Beauty Award for It's Topless
