= Joe Greenwell =

British business executive (b.1951)

Joseph Greenwell
- Born: 8 May 1951 (age 75)
- Education: University of East Anglia (B.A.)
- Occupation: Business executive

Joseph Greenwell CBE, DL (born 8 May 1951) is a British business executive.

Greenwell was educated at Purbrook Grammar School and at the University of East Anglia (BA, English and American Literature). He was chairman and CEO of Jaguar Land Rover from 2003 to 2005 and chairman of Ford UK from 2009 to 2013. He was appointed a CBE in the Queen's birthday honours 2011.

In June 2013 he was appointed head of the UK's Automotive Investment Organisation, a position he held until 2015.

In July 2013 he took up the position of chair of the RAC Foundation - a transport research organisation and registered charity.

He became chair of the University of East Anglia Council in 2016.

In January 2018 it was revealed that Greenwell would become chairman of Xtrac Limited which describes itself as being recognised "as the worldwide leader in the design and manufacture of transmission systems supporting a wide client base covering top level Motorsport and high performance Automotive". Greenwell began the role in July 2018.

He is a Deputy Lieutenant of Warwickshire.
