= Paul Williams (health service manager) =

Sir Paul Michael Williams, OBE KStJ, DL (born 25 June 1948), is a British former National Health Service manager, who was Chief Executive of NHS Wales between 2009 and 2011.

== Career ==
He was born in Wales, and joined the NHS as a clerk at the Welsh Hospital Board in 1966. Later in his career he became, successively, Assistant District General Manager of Mid Glamorgan Health Authority, Chief Executive of Bridgend NHS Trust (1993–99), Chief Executive of Bro Morgannwg NHS Trust, and Chief Executive of Abertawe Bro Morgannwg University Health Board. He was Chair of NHS Staff College Wales, 1995-2001. He was seconded as Chief Executive of NHS Wales for a two-year period starting in January 2009.

In April 2013, it was announced by Wales' First Minister Carwyn Jones that Williams would chair a new Commission on Public Service Governance and Delivery, to make recommendations for fundamental reforms of local government organisation in Wales. The Commission reported in January 2014.

== Honours ==
He was appointed Officer of the Order of the British Empire (OBE) in 2000 for services to the NHS in Wales, was UK president of the Institute of Healthcare Management (IHM) from 2002–05, and was High Sheriff for the County of South Glamorgan in 2007/08. He was appointed as Chancellor of the Order of St John, Priory for Wales, in April 2011. He was knighted in the 2011 Birthday Honours. He is active within Freemasonry.
