= Kathryn McDowell =

British classical musician and businessperson

Dame Kathryn Alexandra McDowell, DBE, DL (born 19 December 1959) is a British classical musician and businessperson. Since 2005, she has been the managing director of the London Symphony Orchestra.

== Honours ==
In 2009, McDowell was appointed a Deputy Lieutenant (DL) to the Lord Lieutenant of Greater London. She was appointed Commander of the Order of the British Empire (CBE) in the 2011 Birthday Honours for services to music and Dame Commander of the Order of the British Empire (DBE) in the 2023 Birthday Honours, also for services to music.
