= Charlie Clapham =

British football executive

Charles Clapham MBE (born 7 August 1946), more commonly known as Charlie Clapham, is a former chairman of Southport Football Club, an English football club that play in the National League North.

Clapham was born in Accrington and lived there until he was seven years old. His family then relocated to Coventry. He grew up supporting Coventry City and, having been converted by his brother, Manchester United.

== Business interests ==
In 1978, while working in the West Midlands as a regional sales director, he co-founded Palace Chemicals with three business associates. This saw Clapham following his new venture to Liverpool, eventually moving to nearby Southport in 1981.

In October 1995, the company acquired competitor Langlow Products Limited, incorporating the product line into their portfolio. This was followed up by the acquisition of Houseplan, known for their sealants and adhesives, in September 2000.

He is Managing Director of Palace Chemicals Ltd based in Speke, Merseyside, having completed a management buy-out in 1990.

== Chairman of Southport Football Club ==
A little over a year after moving to Southport he made his first visit to Haig Avenue where Southport were at the lowest point in the club's history. Having been voted out of The Football League in 1978, they were languishing in the Northern Premier League with attendances falling and debts spiralling out of control. At this game Clapham was handed a piece of paper as he entered the ground that read:

You might have read we are in trouble but not as much trouble as they are saying we are. If you think you might be able to help come and see the directors after the game

After getting in touch with then chairman Gary Culshaw and vice chairman Barry Hedley, Clapham used his background in business as an attempt to trade the club out of their financial difficulties. After 18 months however Culshaw walked out. In an impromptu board meeting in Hedley's front room Clapham stepped forward as the new chairman of Southport Football Club.

Under Clapham Southport saw a turnaround in fortunes both on and off the pitch. The ground was revamped with new stands, the club was now running at a profit and in the 1992/93 season Brian Kettle managed the side to Northern Premier League title and promotion back to the highest level of non-league football the Football Conference. The next ten years saw Southport compete primarily in the top half of the table, regularly being the top semi-professional side in the country. A trip to Wembley Stadium in 1998 as the losing finalists in the FA Trophy under the guidance of Paul Futcher is one of the highest points in Clapham's tenure as chairman. In 2000, Clapham gave former Liverpool and England defender Mark Wright his first managerial job, investing heavily but ultimately failing to win promotion back to the football league.

Since 2005, Clapham has been vice chairman of the Football Conference

Clapham oversaw Southport transitioning from a semi professional to professional club in 2006 as an attempt to consolidate their position in the Conference Premier. This was the first time Southport had been a professional club and employed a solely full-time group of players and back room staff. However Southport reverted to part-time status (though some players are full-time in order to train the youth teams).

In 2007, Clapham was elected to the FA Council following Lord Burns' structural review of the national governing body. He serves as a member of numerous committees, representing the views of non-league football.

During Clapham's time as chairman, the club has sold several players for sizeable sums of money and to teams higher up the footballing pyramid. Steve Whitehall was sold to Rochdale A.F.C. in 1991 for a club record £25,000. Carl Baker was the next player to be sold for a large sum of money and in the process smashed the previous club record, moving to Morecambe in July 2007 for a reputed £50,000. Craig Noone moved to Plymouth Argyle for an undisclosed fee that could eventually rise to a new club record in excess of £100,000 despite never playing a competitive game for the club. In May 2009 Morecambe raided Southport again, signing Mark Duffy for £20,000 after a short loan spell. Zac Aley moved to Blackburn Rovers for an undisclosed fee in February 2010, however it is believed the club would reap the benefits financially if he establishes himself as a first team player.

In the 2011 Birthday Honours, Clapham was appointed Member of the Order of the British Empire (MBE) "for services to Manufacture and to Football in Merseyside."
