= Clive Lewis (business psychologist) =

British psychologist

Clive Oscar Lewis OBE DL was a business psychologist and author. He was a workplace mediator in the UK and a frequent commentator on employment and industrial relations issues. He died in 2023.

== Public affairs ==
Lewis was interviewed by the BBC to talk about the role mediation could play in the 2009 Royal Mail dispute. In the same year, the Algerian government invited him to give a speech titled "Mediation – The British Perspective", at a conference attended by about 400 members of the Algerian judiciary. He gave similar talks in Jordan and the European Parliament. He was an adviser on the Gibbons Review into UK workplace practices.

He attended a meeting of the All-Party Parliamentary Group for Alternative Dispute Resolution and was honorary secretary for the Civil Mediation Council until 2015. His research on mediation and organisation diagnosis in the National Health Service was shortlisted for an award by the Association for Business Psychology in 2017.

== Local roles ==
In 2011, he was awarded the OBE for his work in mediation and for chairing the government commissioned REACH report. He was appointed Deputy Lieutenant of Gloucestershire in 2012. He was a member of the board of governors for the University of the West of England, Bristol.

Lewis founded the Bridge Builders Mentoring Scheme in 2014. The scheme focuses on social mobility for boys and girls from disadvantaged backgrounds. He was also founder of the Senior Women’s Lunch held annually at the House of Lords.

== Publications ==
He authored 14 books, including How to Master Workplace and Employment Mediation, published by Bloomsbury in 2015. His book on tackling difficult conversations was featured in the Sunday Times.
