= Terence Suthers =

British museum curator and conservator (1944–2024)

Terence Suthers MBE DL FRSA
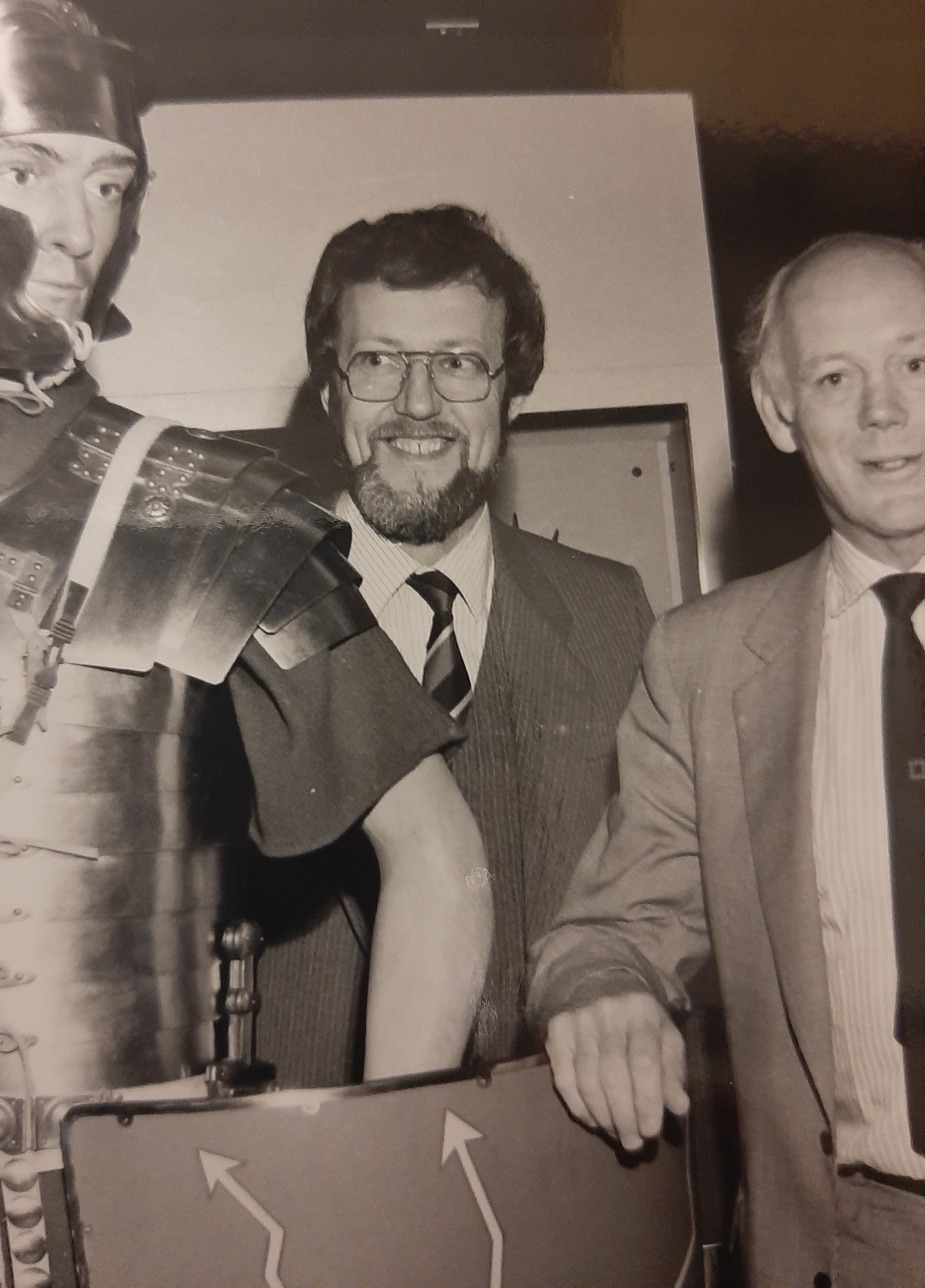
- Suthers at the opening of the Yorkshire Museum's new Roman gallery in 1985
- Born: 1 June 1944; Rossendale
- Died: March 24, 2024 (aged 79)
- Occupations: Archaeologist; Museum curator

Academic work
- Institutions: Yorkshire Museum; Harewood House; York Archaeological Trust

Terence "Terry" Suthers MBE DL FRSA (1 June 1944 – 24 March 2024) was a British conservator, museum curator and director. He was a Deputy lieutenant for the County of West Yorkshire.

== Career ==
Trained initially as a conservator and archaeology curator with Hull and East Riding Museum. In 1972 he was appointed deputy director of the Yorkshire Area Museums Council where he provided regional advisory visits to museums. He then benefitted from a Churchill Fellowship to study heritage restoration projects in Italy and North Africa throughout 1980.

Suthers was appointed curator of the Yorkshire Museum on 6 April 1983, succeeding Michael Clegg in the post. He was subsequently the assistant director and head of public services at the Science Museum, London, from 1987 to 1992, then executive director of Harewood House from 1992 to 2007. Under Suther's direction, Harewood House became the first UK country house to become a fully Registered and Accredited Museum with collections designated of national importance.

He served for ten years as chairman of York Archaeological Trust (2007–2017),. He was a Trustee of York Civic Trust between 2003 and 2008 and again from 2018 to 2019. He was a Trustee of York Museums Trust between 2002 and 2008, and was a vice chairman of Yorkshire Film Archive (2002–2024).

In 2005 he was made a deputy lieutenant for the County of West Yorkshire and in 2012 was appointed a Member of the Order of the British Empire (MBE) for Services to the Heritage and Museums in Yorkshire.

== Death ==
He died following a lengthy illness on 24 March 2024. His funeral was held on 25 April 2024 at York Minster with a tribute given by The Earl of Harewood.

== Publications ==
- Suthers, T. 1975. Hull old and new. Wakefield : EP Publishing.
- Buddle, A. and Suthers, T. 1979. Cutting betel in style. Yorkshire and Humberside Museum and Art Gallery Service.
- Suthers, T. 1984. "Conservation of Mosaics in Europe and North Africa", Annual Report of the Yorkshire Philosophical Society for the year 1983, York, Yorkshire Philosophical Society, 48–58.
