= John Scott (Lord Lieutenant) =

Scottish farmer and public servant

Sir John Hamilton Scott, KCVO (born 1936) is a retired Scottish farmer and public servant.

Born in 1936, Scott farms on Bressay and the Isle of Noss – two of the Shetland Islands. In the early 1960s, he had been a shepherd in Caithness in mainland Scotland and since 1981 he has been chairman of Woolgrowers of Shetland Ltd. He has been described as a "leading figure in the wool industry" on the islands.

He has held a number of public offices and served on a range of local advisory boards, including a spell as president of the Shetland branch of the National Farmers' Union in 1976, and five years as Chairman of the Shetland Arts Trust. Between 1994 and 2011, he was Lord Lieutenant of Shetland and a trustee of the Shetland Charitable Trust, noted for his reformist work on that body; as Lord Lieutenant he welcomed Prince Charles on visits to the island in 2000 and 2007 and chaired the organising committee of the Tall Ships' Races in 1999 and the Island Games in 2005. He also headed a trust to renovate Belmont House, which raised more than £1 million for the project.

In 2011, Scott was appointed a Knight Commander of the Royal Victorian Order, shortly before he retired as Lord Lieutenant (on his 75th birthday).
