= Lord Lieutenant of Shetland =

Ceremonial officer in Shetland, Scotland

This is a list of people who have served as Lord-Lieutenant of Shetland. The office was created when that of Lord Lieutenant of Orkney and Shetland was divided in 1948

- Sir Arthur Nicolson, 11th Baronet of Lasswade 8 April 1948 – 25 April 1952
- Sir Basil Neven-Spence 21 July 1952 – 1963
- Robert Bruce 5 July 1963 – 1982
- Magnus Shearer 6 October 1982 – 1994
- John Hamilton Scott 21 April 1994 – 2011
- Bobby Hunter 30 November 2011 – 2024
- Lindsay Tulloch 5 February 2024 - present
