= Africans Unite Against Child Abuse =

UK charity

Africans Unite Against Child Abuse, AFRUCA - a UK charity, established in 2001 by Modupe Debbie Ariyo, as a group that claims to advocate for the rights and welfare of African children. AFRUCA was set up in response to the deaths of African children in the UK such as Damilola Taylor, Jude Akapa, and Victoria Climbié who suffered long term abuse. AFRUCA works both across the UK from two bases in London and Manchester, and internationally in partnership with agencies across Europe and in Africa. AFRUCA also heavily relies on the 1989 United Nation Convention on the Rights of the Child to form the basis of their work. The organization openly opposes child abuse.

== Mission ==
AFRUCA's stated mission is to promote the rights and welfare of African children.

== Aims and objectives ==
- Raise the profile of African children in the UK, and create awareness of their needs in ways that promote a positive climate for change.
- Ensure that children are aware of the risks of abuse, know their rights, and have skills to protect themselves.
- Promote positive parenting among African parents and others who care for children.
- Increase the understanding of service providers and those with leadership roles in relation to African communities about the risks of abuse to African children, and promote the development of appropriate services, practices, and support to African families.
- Influence the development of policy and regulatory action in ways that will safeguard African children.
- Develop the leadership potential of young Africans.

== Work areas ==
AFRUCA has five areas they state as their main areas of work:

1. Awareness raising and sensitization
2. Information, education, and advisory services
3. Advocacy and policy development
4. Community and international development
5. Support for children and families in crisis

== Ongoing work in the UK ==
- Community volunteering project – London and South of England
- Safeguarding children from witchcraft branding policy project
- Safeguarding child victims of trafficking across London and the South of England
- Working with faith organisations to safeguard African children
- Expert assessments and reports in immigration cases
- Family support programme
- Dove Project – supporting families affected by witchcraft branding in Newham

== Work in Nigeria ==
AFRUCA Foundation for the Protection of the Rights of Vulnerable Children in Nigeria Project focuses on improving the environment for children in Nigerian through the following areas:

- Trafficking of children within and across borders
- Child slavery as plantation workers, camel minders, and mine workers
- Child domestic servitude
- Use of children as soldiers
- Sexual abuse
- Sexual exploitation
- Street children/AIDS orphans
- Socio-cultural traditional practices that impact negatively on children
