= Sacha Jenkins =

American music journalist (1971–2025)

- Born: August 22, 1971; Philadelphia, Pennsylvania, U.S.
- Died: May 23, 2025 (aged 53); New York City, U.S.
- Education: Columbia University
- Occupation: Journalist; graffiti historian; hip‑hop analyst; filmmaker
- Known for: Co-founding Ego Trip magazine
- Spouse: Raquel Cepeda
- Children: 2
- Father: Horace B. Jenkins

Sacha Sebastian Jenkins (August 22, 1971 – May 23, 2025) was an American television producer, filmmaker, writer, musician, artist, curator and chronicler of hip-hop, graffiti, punk, and metal cultures. While still in his teens, Jenkins published Graphic Scenes & X-Plicit Language, one of the earliest 'zines solely dedicated to "graffiti" art. In 1994, Jenkins co-founded Ego Trip magazine. In 2007, he created the competition reality program Ego Trip's The (White) Rapper Show, which was carried by VH1. Jenkins was the creative director of Mass Appeal magazine.

== Early life ==
Sacha Jenkins was born in Philadelphia, on August 22, 1971. The Jenkins family lived in Silver Spring, Maryland which is adjacent to Washington, D.C., until Sacha Jenkins was seven years old. After his parents separated, Jenkins' father, Horace Byrd Jenkins III, moved to Harlem. (Horace was a professor of communications at Howard University.) Jenkins, along with his mother, Monart, and his sister, Dominique, moved to Queens, New York in 1977.

Horace Jenkins won Emmy Awards for his contributions to the TV programs The Advocates, Sesame Street, and 30 Minutes (CBS TV series), and was a pioneer in the TV magazine format with the program Black Journal. Under the name Horace Jenkins, he wrote and directed the feature film Cane River (1982). In the same year, Horace died of a heart attack.

Sacha Jenkins' mother, Monart, who is of Haitian origin, is a painter who has exhibited her work in galleries in Washington, D.C., and New York City.

== Education ==
Jenkins graduated from William Cullen Bryant High School in Astoria in Queens, New York in 1990. He went to Brooklyn College and City College of New York. In 2000, Jenkins was awarded a fellowship to the Graduate School of Journalism via National Arts Journalism Program at Columbia University.

== Career ==
In 1988, Jenkins published his first 'zine—Graphic Scenes & Xplicit Language—one of the earliest magazines dedicated to graffiti art. In 1992, Jenkins and childhood friend Haji Akhigbade established Beat-Down Newspaper, a very early hip-hop newspaper. Beat Down's music editor was future blogger Elliott Wilson.

In June 1994, after a falling out between Akhigbade and Jenkins, Jenkins and Wilson co-founded ego trip magazine. The magazine published 13 issues during the next four years—with content spanning everything from rap to skateboarding to punk rock to interviews bearing Count Chocula's byline. Eventually, there were Ego Trip books (ego trip's Book of Rap Lists and ego trip's Big Book of Racism) and Ego Trip television series ["Race-O-Rama" (2005), ego trip's The White Rapper Show (2007) and Miss Rap Supreme (2008)]—all carried by VH1. Jenkins himself wrote and produced a number of film and television projects. In 2005, he began working as a writer on season one of Aaron McGruder's hit series The Boondocks. In 2011, Jenkins was executive producer of "50 Cent: The Origin of Me"—a documentary that traces the genealogy of rapper Curtis "50 Cent" Jackson.

Between 1997 and 2000, Jenkins was the music editor of Vibe magazine. He wrote articles and features for Spin magazine and Rolling Stone about a wide array of recording artists—from Nas to Queens of the Stone Age to The Mars Volta and Kid Rock. Jenkins co-authored Eminem's biography,The Way I Am, with Eminem. With co-author David "Chino" Villorente, Jenkins created the influential Piecebook series of books. (Piecebooks are the sketchbooks that graffiti artists used to map out their works or "pieces" before committing them to a larger surface. The Piecebook series highlights drawings that span the globe and go as far back as 1973.) In 2007, Jenkins wrote the foreword to Jon Naar's The Birth of Graffiti, a book devoted to graffiti in New York in the 1970s.

Jenkins was the creative director of Mass Appeal, an urban culture magazine and website founded in 1996. He was also writing a biography with the Beastie Boys, and was finishing up his directorial debut, Fresh Dressed—a documentary film about the history of hip-hop fashion—for CNN Films. Jenkins was a member of The Wilding Incident and The White Mandingos, a rock band that also features rapper Murs and Bad Brains bassist Darryl Jenifer. Their debut single and full-length LP—both titled "The Ghetto Is Tryna Kill Me"—were issued by Fat Beats records in June 2013.

Jenkins collaborated with other notable musicians to present their works in the theater space. In 2009, he wrote and produced an off-Broadway play entitled Deez Nuts: A Musical Massacre, about a journalist who interviews rap group The Beatnuts. Two years later he directed "Negroes On Ice," a traveling production featuring Grammy Award-winning producer Prince Paul. In 2022, Jenkins wrote, directed and executive-produced the documentary series Everything's Gonna Be All White. He was a member of the National Arts Journalism Program.

== Personal life and death ==
Jenkins was married to author/filmmaker Raquel Cepeda. The couple have two children, Djali Brown-Cepeda (Jenkins' stepdaughter) and a son, Marceau.

Jenkins died at his home in Manhattan on May 23, 2025, as a result of complications from multiple system atrophy. He was 53.

== Exhibits ==
- Writers Convention: A Collaborative Study of Pigments, at Bill Adler's Eyejammie Fine Arts Gallery, New York, November 4 – December 17, 2005; Jenkins described the show as a series of painted "duets" with artists including Chino BYI, Claw Money, Cycle, Daze, Eric Haze, Kaves, Mint & Serf, Jose Parlá, and SP One
- Write On Bros.: Paintings and Words by Sacha Jenkins SHR and the Legendary Livingroom Johnston, at the Eyejammie Fine Arts Gallery, New York, May 9, 2007 – June 2, 2007
- Write of Passage, Red Bull Studios, October–November 2013

== Books ==
- With Elliott Wilson, Jeff Mao and Gabe Alvarez, ego trip's Book of Rap Lists, St. Martin's Griffin (1999)
- With Elliott Wilson, Chairman Jefferson Mao, Gabriel Alvarez, and Brent Rollins, ego trip's Big Book of Racism, Harper Perennial (2002)
- "The Writing on the Wall: Graffiti Culture Crumbles into the Violence It Once Escaped," a chapter in And It Don't Stop: The Best American Hip-Hop Journalism of the Last 25 Years, Raquel Cepeda, editor, Faber & Faber (2004)
- With Eminem, The Way I Am, Dutton Adult (2008)
- With David Villorente, Piecebook: The Secret Drawings of Graffiti Writers, Prestel (2008)
- With David Villorente, Piecebook Reloaded: Rare Graffiti Drawings 1985–2005, Prestel (2009)
- With David Villorente, World Piecebook: Global Graffiti Drawings, Prestel (2011)
- With Carlo McCormick, Sean Corcoran, Lee Quiñones, City As Canvas: New York City Graffiti from the Martin Wong Collection, Skira Rizzoli (2013)
- With Howie Abrams, The Merciless Book of Metal Lists, Harry N. Abrams (2013)
- With Henry Chalfant, Training Days: The Subway Artists Then and Now, Thames & Hudson (October 2014)

== See also ==
- List of writers on popular music
- Music journalism
