= Terry Lane (musician) =

American singer

- Terry Lane on the cover of his debut album Addiction, 2015

Background information
- Born: Terry Turnage Jr. Sikeston, Missouri, U.S.
- Occupations: Singer; songwriter
- Website: terrylanemusic.com

Terry Turnage Jr., known professionally as Terry Lane, is an American R&B singer active since 2009. Terry Lane was performing under the stage name "Cazual" until November 2014.

== Early life ==
Terry Lane was born in Sikeston, Missouri and raised in Columbus Georgia, where he developed his interest in music. Terry Lane started singing at the age of seven, but announced himself officially at the age of 20. Terry Lane has served in the United States Army.

== Music career ==
Terry Lane has worked with Tom Davis Productions and artists like Charlie Boy, Rich Boy, Soulja Boy, Trey Songz and Plies. His VEVO album 'Addiction' was released in February 2015.

Terry Lane's music is mainly influenced by music genres like jazz, pop, and R&B. His debut single "Let Me Get It" was released in 2011. Terry Lane is a VEVO artist since 2014.

On October 29, 2019, Terry Lane interviewed with Respect Magazine on the release of his latest album "Addiction".
