= Danyel Smith =

American journalist (born 1965)

Danyel Smith Wilson
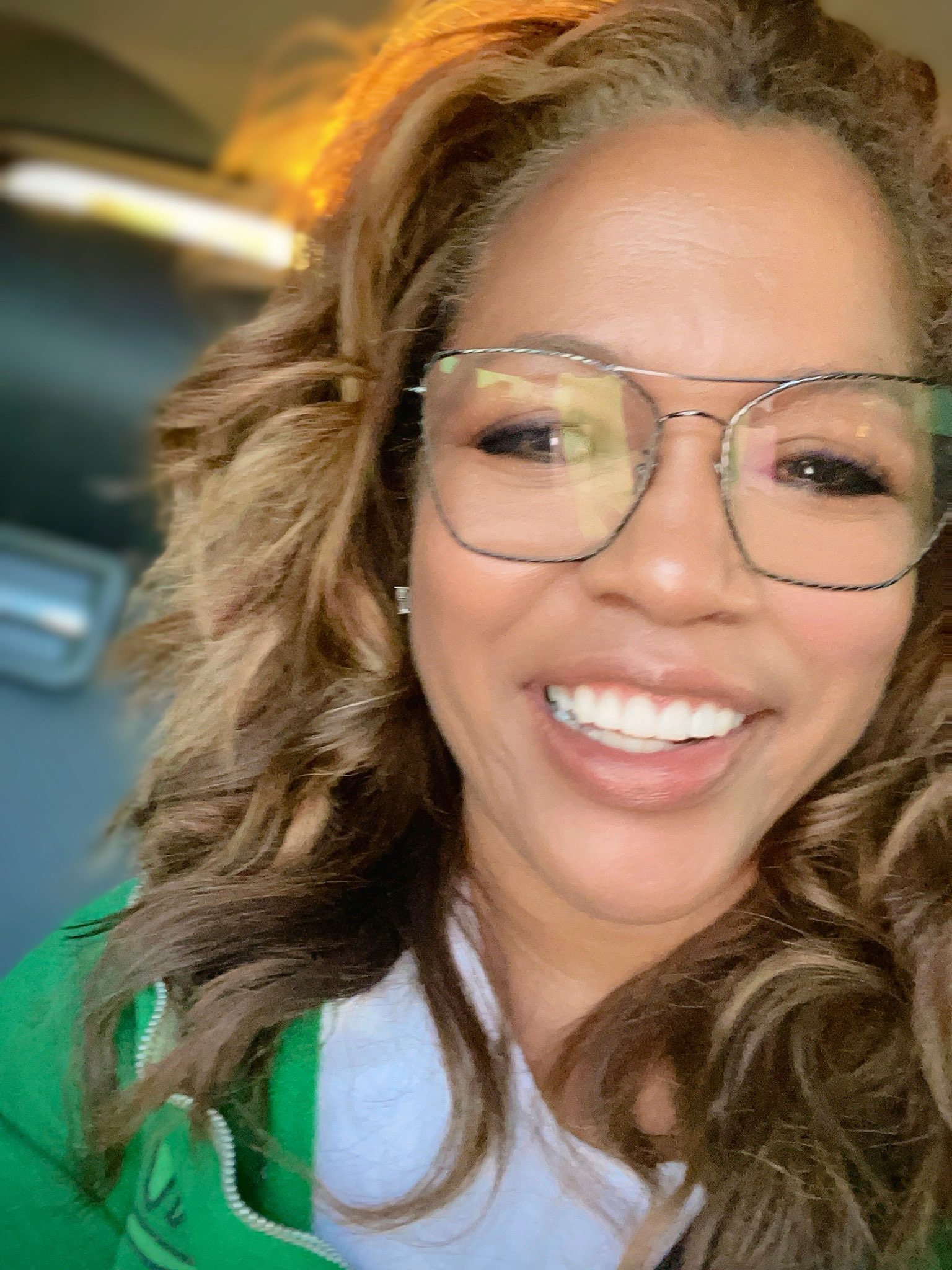
- Born: Danyel Smith; 1965 (age 60–61); Oakland, California, U.S.
- Education: Journalism
- Alma mater: University of California, Berkeley
- Occupations: Journalist, magazine editor, Writer
- Years active: 1989-present
- Known for: Celebrity interviews
- Notable work: Shine Bright, More Like Wrestling, Bliss
- Spouse: Elliott Wilson
- Website: www.danyelsmithwriter.com

Danyel Smith Wilson (born Danyel Smith; 1965) is an American magazine editor, journalist, and novelist . Smith is the former and first African-American editor of Billboard and Vibe magazine, respectively. She is author of two novels and a history of African-American women in pop music.

== Early life ==
Smith was born in Oakland, California, and began writing at a young age through keeping journals and creating a newspaper called the Weekly Arrow in the fourth grade. Following a relocation to Los Angeles at the age of 10, Smith graduated high school in 1983 at St. Mary's Academy in Inglewood, California. Upon graduation, Smith returned to the Bay area to attend the University of California, Berkeley.

== Career ==
Smith started her career in 1989 as a freelance writer, columnist and critic in the San Francisco Bay Area at the San Francisco Bay Guardian and the East Bay Express. From 1990 to 1991, she served as the music editor of SF Weekly. By 1992, Smith was freelancing as a reporter for Spin magazine, where she wrote a pop culture/music column called "Dreaming America". In 1993, Smith moved to New York to become rhythm and blues editor for Billboard magazine. At that time, she was also reviewing live shows and recorded music for The New York Times.

In 1994, she became music editor of what was then Quincy Jones' new Vibe magazine. Two years later, Smith was awarded the National Arts Journalism Program fellowship at Northwestern University Medill School of Journalism. After her year in Evanston, Illinois, she was named editor-in-chief of Vibe in 1997 where she was the first African-American, and first female editor. While at Vibe, she also served as editorial director of its sister publication, Blaze, a monthly hip-hop magazine launched in 1998. In 1999, she resigned and joined Time Inc. as an editor-at-large. There she consulted and wrote for magazines including Time, Entertainment Weekly and InStyle' Throughout her career, Smith has served on a number of nominating committees, including the Rock and Roll Hall of Fame and National Magazine Awards.

Smith left Time Inc. in 2001 to pursue a Master of Fine Arts in fiction at the New School University, then published two novels and taught at the university level. During this period, Smith worked as a workshop leader at the Radcliffe Publishing Course in Cambridge, Massachusetts, and served on the adjunct faculty of the Writing Program at the New School University. While working on her second novel, Bliss, Smith was on the guest faculty at Saint Mary's College of California. Smith was also a writer-in-residence at Skidmore College.

In 2006, Smith returned to Vibe as chief content officer of Vibe Media Group, responsible for the digital as well as the paper platforms. Smith's cover profile of Keyshia Cole was featured in Da Capo Press's Best Music Writing 2008. After three years, Smith had a short stint at The Washington Post's African-American political site, The Root, before returning to the music industry publication Billboard as editor. Smith remained at Billboard until 2012 when she resigned. Smith was a 2014 John S. Knight Journalism Fellow at Stanford University. In addition to creating the "book-shaped magazine" HRDCVR, Smith and her husband hosted a podcast on iTunes called Relationship Goals, in which they talk about pop culture, hip-hop music and how they make their relationship work. From 2016 to 2019, Smith was culture editor at ESPN's The Undefeated. Smith regularly appears on network and cable television outlets to provide commentary on entertainment and pop culture topics. and hosts the podcast Black Girl Songbook on Spotify. In August 2026, Smith joined The Atlantic as a staff writer following three years as contributing writer at The New York Times Magazine.

=== Books ===
Smith began writing fiction in 1996 and authored her first novel, More Like Wrestling (Crown), in 2003. More Like Wrestling, a coming-of-age story of two sisters growing up in Oakland, drew critical praise and was a San Francisco Chronicle bestseller. The New York Times Book Review called it "lyrical and original", while The Washington Post said that Smith's "prose sings with precision". The title comes from a quote from philosopher Marcus Aurelius: "the art of living is more like wrestling than dancing." In 2005, Smith published her second novel, Bliss, about a female record executive navigating personal and professional challenges in the late 90s. Smith's third book, Shine Bright: A Very Personal History of Black Women in Pop (Roc Lit 101/Random House), previously titled She's Every Woman: The Power of Black Women in Pop Music, is a combination of memoir and criticism that tells the "intimate history of Black women's music as the foundational story of American pop."

=== HRDCVR ===
In 2014, while at Stanford University for a Knight Journalism Fellowship, Smith launched HRDCVR with her husband, Elliott Wilson. HRDCVR is a bound, hardcover culture magazine "created by diverse teams for a diverse world." Smith and Wilson crowdfunded the project, raising over $67,000 with support from over 500 "backers." The bound magazine was printed, distributed to funders, and made available for purchase on the project website in October 2015. A one-time publication with a print edition of 2,000, HRDCVR includes articles on Drake, Jamal Crawford, and Sasha and Malia Obama, and features contributions from Janet Mock, Big Boi, Michael Arceneaux, Jeff Chang, Kid Fury, and Tinashe, among others. In addition to the magazine, Smith and Wilson produced a weekly newsletter, HRDlist, that featured similar content.

=== Miscellany ===
A quote from Smith's writings is used as an example in the definition of the word "wack" in the eleventh edition of Merriam-Webster's Collegiate Dictionary ("where there are skilled moments, there are wack ones as well").

== Works ==
=== Novels ===
- More Like Wrestling (2003)
- Bliss (2005)

=== Non-Fiction ===
- "Introduction" in Tupac Amaru Shakur: 1971–1996 (1998)
- HRDCVR (2015) with Elliott Wilson OCLC 933899052
- Shine Bright: A Very Personal History of Black Women in Pop (2022)

=== Podcasts ===
- Take it Personal with Elliott Wilson (2009–2010)
- Relationship Goals with Elliott Wilson (2015–2016)
- Black Girl Songbook (part of The Ringer network) (2021–)

=== Selected anthologized works ===
- Interview with Don Cornelius in liner notes for Soul Train Hall of Fame: 20th Anniversary compilation album (1994)
- "Ain't a Damn Thing Changed: Why Women Rappers Don't Sell" in Rap on Rap: Straight-up Talk on Hip-Hop Culture edited by Adam Sexton (1995)
- "Dreaming America: Hip-hop Culture" in Rock She Wrote edited by Evelyn McDonnell and Ann Powers (1995)
- "Janet Jackson" in Trouble Girls: the Rolling Stone Book of Women in Rock edited by Barbara O'Dair (1997)
- "Hit 'em up: on the life and death of Tupac Shakur" in Step into a World: a Global Anthology of the New Black Literature edited by Kevin Powell (2000)
- "Foxy Brown: She Got Game" in Hip Hop Divas by Vibe Books (2001)
- "Foxy Brown is the Illest" in And it Don't Stop: the Best American Hip-hop Journalism of the Last 25 Years edited by Raquel Cepeda (2004)
- "Foxy" (audio recording) on The Moth: Audience Favorites Vol. 1 (Disc 2) compilation album (2004)
- "Black Talk and Hot Sex: Why Street Lit Is Literature" in Total Chaos: the Art and Aesthetics of Hip-hop edited by Jeff Chang (2006)
- "Janet Jackson: Janet's Back," "Sean 'Puffy' Combs:...and Still Champion," and "Wesley Snipes: The Trouble with Wesley" in The Vibe Q: Raw and Uncut edited by Rob Kenner and Rakia Clark (2007)
- "Keyshia Cole: Hell's Angel" in Best Music Writing 2008 edited by Daphne Carr and Nelson George (2008)
- "After 30 Years, I Finally Went to a Barry Manilow Concert" in Shake it Up: Great American Writing on Rock and Pop from Elvis to Jay Z edited by Kevin Dettmar and Jonathan Lethem (2017)

== Honors, awards, and fellowships ==
- 1996 National Arts Journalism Program Fellowship (Medill School of Journalism, Northwestern University)
- 2003 Millay Colony for the Arts Residency
- 2011 African American Literary Award
- 2014 John S. Knight Journalism Fellowship at Stanford University
- 2017 Shorty Award for Best Journalist (Nominee)
- 2019 NABJ Award for Sports for feature on Simone Biles with The Undefeated
- 2021 Yaddo Fellowship
- 2023 NAACP Image Award Nomination for Black Girl Songbook podcast

== Personal life ==
Smith's mother is of Filipino and African-American descent. She has one younger sister, Raquel. In addition, she has a younger stepsister, Nicole, and stepbrother Keith. Smith currently lives in Southern California with her husband, Elliott Wilson. They were married in Los Angeles in June 2005.

== See also ==
- Vibe (magazine)
- List of writers on popular music
- Music journalism
