= Yellow Fog =

1986 novel by Les Daniels

- Dust-jacket from the first edition
- Author: Les Daniels
- Illustrator: Frank Villano
- Cover artist: Frank Villano
- Language: English
- Series: Don Sebastian
- Genre: Horror
- Published: 1986 (Donald M. Grant, Publisher, Inc.)
- Publication place: United States
- Media type: Print (hardback)
- Pages: 191 pp
- ISBN: 0-937986-82-8
- OCLC: 15078633
- Dewey Decimal: 813/.54 19
- LC Class: PS3554.A5637 Y45 1986
- Preceded by: Citizen Vampire
- Followed by: No Blood Spilled

Yellow Fog is a horror novel by Les Daniels. It was first published in 1986 by Donald M. Grant, Publisher, Inc. in an edition of 800 copies which were signed by the author and slipcased. The novel is part of the author's Don Sebastian series. An expanded edition was published by Tor Books in 1988 (ISBN 0-812-51675-3).

== Plot introduction ==
The novel concerns the vampire Don Sebastian in Victorian England.
