= Creem =

American music magazine

CREEM
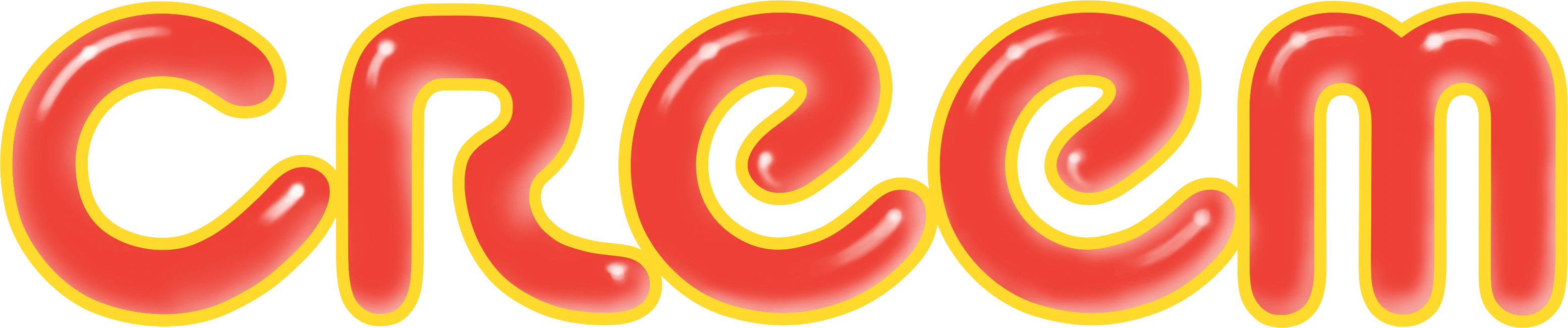

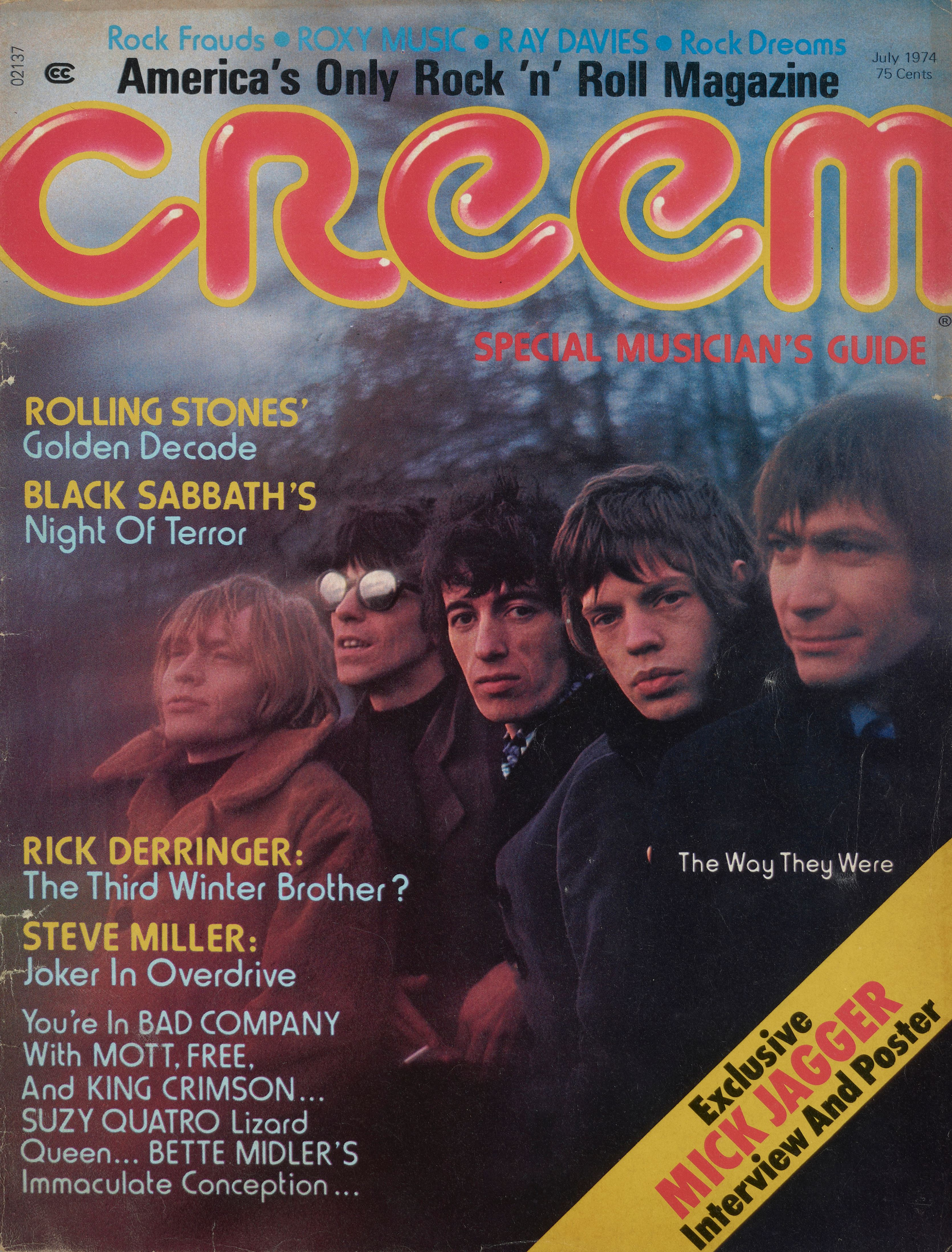
- Issue cover dated July 1974, featuring the Rolling Stones
- Categories: Music magazine
- Publisher: CREEM Magazine, LLC
- First issue: March 1969
- Country: United States
- Based in: Detroit, Michigan
- Language: English
- Website: creem.com
- ISSN: 0011-1147

Creem (often stylized in all caps) is an American rock music magazine and entertainment company, founded in Detroit, whose initial print run lasted from 1969 to 1989. It was first published in March 1969 by Barry Kramer and founding editor Tony Reay. Influential critic Lester Bangs served as the magazine's editor from 1971 to 1976. It suspended production in 1989 but attained a short-lived renaissance in the early 1990s as a tabloid. In June 2022, Creem was relaunched as a digital archive, website, weekly newsletter, and quarterly print edition.

The magazine is noted for having been an early champion of various heavy metal, punk rock, new wave and alternative bands, especially bands based in Detroit. The magazine popularized the terms "punk rock" and "heavy metal".

== History ==
In the winter of 1969, Barry Kramer owned the Detroit record store Full Circle, as well as Mixed Media, a head shop/bookstore, and was an unsuccessful concert promoter and band manager. After the local alternative paper rejected a concert review he had written, he decided to start publishing his own paper. Tony Reay, a clerk at Kramer's record store, became its first editor, and came up with its name, a tribute to his favorite band, Cream. Charlie Auringer became the photo editor and designer, and Dave Marsh joined soon after at age 19. The first issue was distributed only in Detroit, as a tabloid-sized newspaper, but then a deal was struck with a distributor. Many copies were ordered by porn shops who were confused by the faintly suggestive title, and who displayed it next to the similarly sized Screw magazine. Richard "Ric" Siegel became circulation director, Creem become a glossy color magazine sized for newsstand distribution, and within two years had secured a national distribution deal.

For the magazine's first two years, its offices were at 3729 Cass Avenue in Detroit. An armed robbery of the offices prompted Kramer to move the operation to a 120-acre farm in Walled Lake, Michigan, at 13 Mile and Haggerty Roads. Just before the move, Lester Bangs was hired, originally to write a feature on Alice Cooper. He had been fired from the rival music magazine Rolling Stone by publisher Jann Wenner for "disrespecting musicians" after a particularly harsh review of the group Canned Heat. Bangs fell in love with Detroit, calling it "rock's only hope", and remained there for five years.

Many of the staff members lived in the Walled Lake farmhouse, where there were occasional physical altercations between writers. One day, Marsh, who objected to Bangs' poorly housebroken dog, placed the dog's dung on Bangs' typewriter. This resulted in a fistfight that gave Marsh a gash on his head. Eventually, the magazine was successful enough to move to editorial offices in downtown Birmingham, Michigan. In 1971, Bangs became editor, and in 1976 he left the magazine; he never wrote for it again. On January 29, 1981, Kramer died of an accidental overdose of nitrous oxide. A year later, on April 30, 1982, Bangs died in New York City of an accidental Darvon overdose.

The magazine's offices were geographically separated from most of the entertainment industry in the United States, which was then primarily based in Hollywood and New York City. It was known for its irreverent, deprecatory and humorous tone, and became famous for its comical photo captions, which poked fun at rock stars, the industry, and even the magazine itself. The magazine dubbed the tall Plexiglas pyramid that was presented to the winner of the annual American Music Award "the Object From Space", and said it was endowed with the power to force celebrities to look ridiculous while holding it. Because of the magazine's location, it was among the first national publications to provide in-depth coverage of many popular Detroit-area artists, such as Bob Seger, Mitch Ryder, Alice Cooper, The MC5, The Stooges, Iggy Pop, and Parliament-Funkadelic, as well as other Midwestern acts such as Raspberries and Cheap Trick.

== Influence ==
By the mid-1970's Creem had a circulation of over 200,000, making it the second largest rock magazine after Rolling Stone. Creem picked up on punk rock and new wave movements early on. Creem gave exposure to artists like Lou Reed, David Bowie, Roxy Music, Blondie, and The New York Dolls before the mainstream press. In the 1980s, it provided early coverage of upcoming rock bands such as R.E.M., The Replacements, The Smiths, The Go-Go's and The Cure. It was also among the first to praise metal acts like Motörhead, Judas Priest, and Van Halen. It also focused on Detroit acts.

Melvins guitarist Roger "Buzz" Osborne taught Kurt Cobain about punk by loaning him records and old copies of Creem.

Alice Cooper referenced the magazine in his song "Detroit City" – "But the Riff kept a Rockin', the Creem kept a-talkin', and the streets still smokin' today". Thurston Moore of Sonic Youth said: "Having a certain sense of humor in the rock'n'roll culture – CREEM nailed it in a way that nobody else was. It informed a lot of people's sensibilities."

== Staff ==
Publishers, editors and writers for Creem included Barry Kramer, his partner (later his wife) Connie Warren Kramer, Lester Bangs, Dave Marsh, Billy Altman, Bob Fleck, John Morthland, Ben Edmonds, Ed Ward, Richard Riegel, Ric Siegel, Robert Christgau, Richard Meltzer, Nick Tosches, Greil Marcus, Jeffrey Morgan, Lisa Robinson, Richard C. Walls, Rob Tyner, Patti Smith, Peter Laughner, Cameron Crowe, Trixie A. Balm (a.k.a. Lauren Agnelli), Laura Levine, Judy Adams, Jaan Uhelszki, Penny Valentine, Susan Whitall, John "The Mad" Peck, John Mendelsohn, Mike Gormley, Sylvie Simmons, Gregg Turner, Chuck Eddy, Mark J. Norton, Alan Niester, Robert Duncan, Alan Madlane (as Alan Madeleine), Judy Wieder, Colman Andrews, Jim Esposito, Dave DiMartino, Bill Holdship and John Kordosh. These last three edited the final versions of Creem in the 1980s.

The magazine moved its office to Los Angeles in January 1987. Holdship and Kordosh were both involved in Creem's move to Los Angeles after it was purchased by Arnold Levitt, but both had already left the magazine before its move to New York City after Levitt licensed the name to a publisher there, and its ultimate demise. Before licensing Creem to the New Yorkers, Levitt made Judy Wieder editor-in-chief of a heavy metal version of Creem, called Creem Metal, which was originally edited by DiMartino, Holdship and Kordosh.

A young female audience-targeted spinoff, Creem Rock-Shots, was also published, as were countless special editions throughout the 1980s. Former William Morris agent, musician and journalist Mark J. Petracca (aka Dusty Wright) became the editor during its New York residence over 1992–93. Chris Nadler was the last editor before the magazine was shut down. Steve Peters and David Sprague were the final members remaining in the original editorial chain that reached back to 1969.

== Graphic design ==
The Creem logo was designed by Bob Wilson, who also wrote a regular comic strip, "Barney & Mike". The "Mr. Dream Whip" and "Boy Howdy" icons were designed by underground cartoonist Robert Crumb. Both appeared on the cover of the second issue as a black and white drawing titled Detroit 1969. For the December 1971 issue, Wilson colored the drawing, which appeared in every following issue in a Creem's Profiles, a parody of the then-popular Dewar's Profiles, featuring musicians and bands holding cans of "Boy Howdy" beer.

== Change of ownership and disputes ==
Ownership of the magazine, trademark and intellectual property has changed hands numerous times since the death of publisher Barry Kramer in 1981, and the magazine's subsequent bankruptcy.

Arnold Levitt bought the rights to the magazine in 1986 from Connie Kramer, and added titles including one devoted exclusively to metal along with numerous monthly special editions, before shutting down in 1989. In 1990, he licensed it to a group of Florida investors who published a bimonthly glossy tabloid version, but it was not successful either.

The release of writer and director Cameron Crowe's semi-autobiographical film Almost Famous in 2000, and Philip Seymour Hoffman's portrayal of editor Lester Bangs, rekindled interest in Creem and rock journalism of the era. Former Creem photographer Robert Matheu formed Creem Media in 2001 with his cousin Jason Turner and Michigan businessman Ken Kulpa. They negotiated a five-year licensing deal with Levitt, with the option to purchase the magazine's intellectual property rights for $100,000. There was talk about a quarterly print publication in 2011. They launched a website and generated new content, primarily to maintain the brand.

As the five-year deadline of the licensing deal approached, Matheu sought investors, and got a $52,500 investment from Los Angeles disk jockey Chris Carter and Barry Kramer's son J.J. Kramer. Matheu provided the balance of the $100,000.

- Carter and Kramer claim that they were verbally promised one-third of Creem Media for their investment by Matheu.
- Turner and Kulpa claim they were never consulted about the deal, and never approved it.
- Matheu claims he never promised Carter and Kramer such a large share for their investment.

In 2007, Kramer sued in New York County and won, as the Court ruled that Creem Media could take no action without the approval of Carter and Kramer.

Creem Media was sued by T.A. Riggs Licensing LLC in 2010 for breach of contract. Creem Media lost that suit, and Riggs was awarded $575,000. Creem Media was either unable or unwilling to pay. In November 2011, Creem Media attempted to have the judgment set aside, but in January 2012, the Court upheld the Judgment. In February 2012, the Court appointed a Receiver to seize all of Creem Media's assets to help satisfy the outstanding judgment. The Receiver then transferred all of the Intellectual Property from Creem Media, Inc to Riggs. CREEM International, Inc purchased the assets from Riggs to become the new successor company with all rights of ownership.

Matheu tired of the legal battle and resigned from the board of Creem Media in 2009. Creem Media, Inc. became defunct shortly thereafter.

In 2017, a group headed by Kramer acquired the Creem brand and its archives.

== Creem documentary ==
In 2019, the Kramer-led Boy Howdy Productions, in partnership with Muse Production House and New Rose Films, wrapped production on a Creem documentary entitled CREEM: America's Only Rock 'n' Roll Magazine, which world premiered at SXSW 2019 to rave reviews. In February 2020, the film was acquired by Greenwich Entertainment and subsequently released online through paid virtual cinema streaming rental in August 2020.

== 2022 relaunch ==
Following years of litigation, the relaunch of Creem was announced on June 1, 2022, by JJ Kramer, an IP attorney and son of founder Barry Kramer. Management includes former Vice publisher John Martin as CEO, VP of content Fred Pessaro (Vice, Revolver, BrooklynVegan), former Entertainment Weekly copy chief Dan Morrissey as executive editor and original staffer Jaan Uhelszki as editor-at-large.

The relaunched Creem includes digital archives of all 224 issues of the original magazine, a website and weekly newsletter called Fresh Creem, and a quarterly oversized glossy print edition, which commenced publication in the fall of 2022, on a subscription-only basis, with no newsstand sales.

=== Summer Sunburn concerts ===
The relaunched Creem hosts annual live concert events in New York City called "Summer Sunburn." The 2023 version, held at Roberta's in Bushwick, Brooklyn, included a performance by Philadelphia-based shoegaze band Nothing. The 2024 Summer Sunburn concert, also held at Roberta's, featured a performance by hardcore band Pissed Jeans.
