= DC Comics: Sixty Years of the World's Favorite Comic Book Heroes =

- Author: Les Daniels
- Publisher: Bulfinch Press, Little, Brown and Company
- Publication date: October 1995
- Publication place: United States
- Pages: 256
- ISBN: 978-0821220764

DC Comics: Sixty Years of the World's Favorite Comic Book Heroes is a 1995 book written by Les Daniels and published by Bulfinch Press, an imprint of Little, Brown and Company.

== Concept ==
DC Comics: Sixty Years of the World's Favorite Comic Book Heroes is a 256 page large-format book that contains information and re-printed comic book panels from the first 60 years of publication for DC Comics.

== Reception ==
Steve Faragher reviewed DC Comics: Sixty Years of the World's Favorite Comic Book Heroes for Arcane magazine, rating it a 9 out of 10 overall. Faragher comments that "So if you wanted to know that Bob Kane based Batman on a combination of Leonardo da Vinci's sketches, Zorro and Bela Lugosi, or that the quote 'Who watches the watchmen?' is from the ancient Roman poet Juvenal, or even that Jack Nicholson was Bob Kane's suggestion to play the joker several years before the film was made, then this is definitely the book for you."
