= Chino BYI =

American old-school graffiti artist

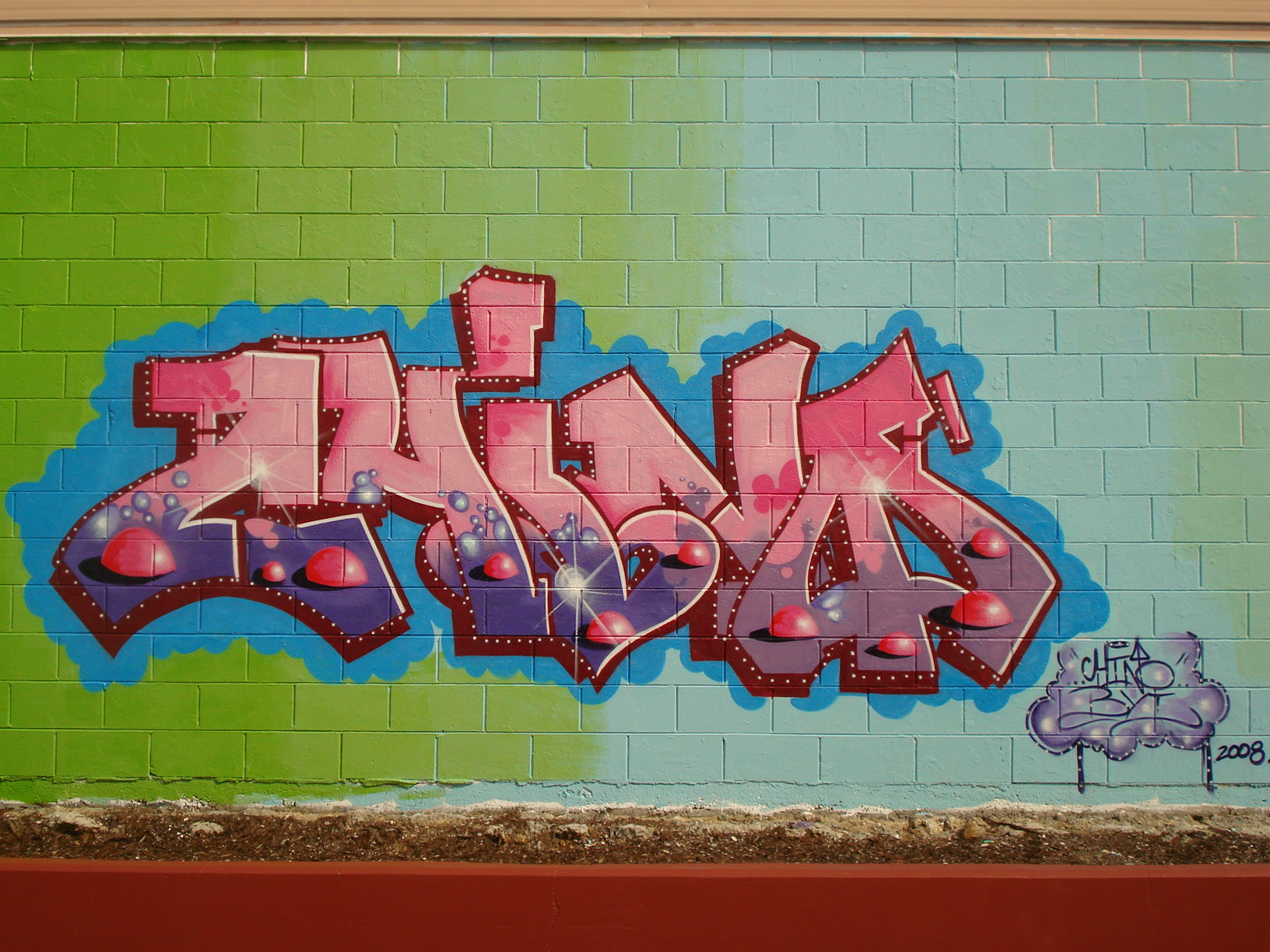
- Chino graffiti in Oakland, California (taken in 2008)
- Born: David Villorente
- Movement: Graffiti
- Website: David CHINO Villorente on Instagram

David Villorente, better known as Chino BYI, is an American old-school graffiti artist and historian of classic graffiti who is based in Brooklyn, New York. He is well-known for his letter designs and is referred to as a legend in the Brooklyn graffiti scene. He was part of the Brooklyn based graffiti crew Beyond Your Imagination (BYI), which was active from the mid-1980s to the late 1980s and included membership by TRIM, ATCO, TRECH, CHINO, TRACK aka TE KAY, SCOTCH 79 aka KEO, SAST and others. He has released four books on graffiti, including a book with Sacha Jenkins entitled World PieceBook: Global Graffiti Drawings (2011). He participated in painting murals for the Nike NYC Garage in 2018 among other events. For over a decade Chino was the editor of The Source magazine's graffiti section.
