= Horace B. Jenkins =

American filmmaker (1941–1982)

Horace B. Jenkins (February 9, 1941 – December 3, 1982) was an American filmmaker who was best known for his film Cane River, which was rediscovered after his death from a heart attack on December 3, 1982. He was the father of music journalist Sacha Jenkins.
