= Elliott Wilson (journalist) =

American journalist, television producer and magazine editor

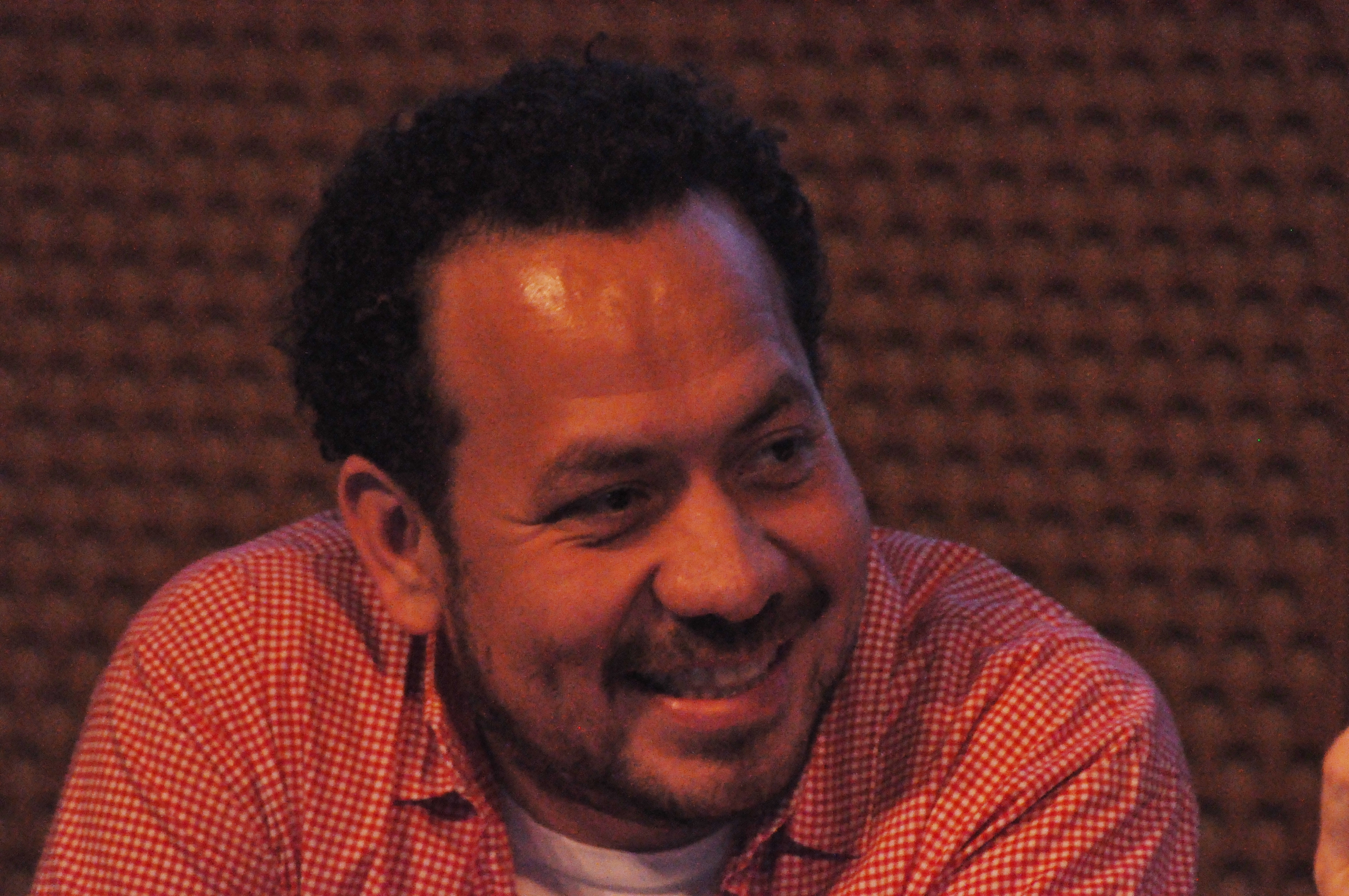
- Wilson at the Museum of Pop Culture in 2010
- Born: January 14, 1971 (age 55); Queens, New York, U.S.
- Education: LaGuardia Community College
- Occupations: Journalist, television producer
- Years active: 1992–present
- Known for: Rap Radar, XXL, Respect.
- Spouse: Danyel Smith (m. 2005)
- Website: rapradar.com

Elliott Wilson (born January 14, 1971) is an American journalist, television producer, and magazine editor. He is the founder and CEO of Rap Radar. In the past, he has worked as editor-in-chief of XXL Magazine. While there, he became known for his editorials under the nickname "YN".

Over the course of his career, Elliott has interviewed and profiled a number of artists, including Jay-Z, Drake, and Mary J. Blige.

As of 2024, he is the editorial director at Uproxx, HipHopDX and Dime Magazine.

== Early life ==
Elliott Wilson was born January 14, 1971, in the Woodside Houses development of Queens, New York. His father is African American and his mother is of Ecuadorian and Greek descent. He attended William Cullen Bryant High School, went on to attend LaGuardia Community College, and received an associate degree in Liberal Arts in 1992. He has two younger brothers, Kenneth and Steven.

== Writing career ==
Wilson has been writing and talking about hip hop and rap music since 1992, when he became music editor for Beat-Down newspaper. He is the co-author of two critically acclaimed books, Book of Rap Lists and Big Book of Racism!. Both books were created in the spirit of the short-lived magazine Ego Trip. In 2004 Entertainment Weekly named the ego trip collective one of the "25 Funniest People in America". Wilson has written for a number of publications, including GQ, Vibe, and Rolling Stone.

In spring of 1996 Wilson went to College Music Journal as a beat-box editor. At the end of that year he was promoted as music editor of The Source magazine. In September, 1999, Wilson went to work at Harris Publications as editor-in-chief of XXL magazine, and in 2005 he launched their website, XXLmag.com. He also co-created XXL Hip-Hop Soul. In 2004, Wilson co-executive produced VH1's TV's Illest Minority Moments: Presented by ego trip. In 2005 Wilson co-executive produced three specials for VH1's Ego Trip's Race-O-Rama: "Blackaphobia", "In Race We Lust", and "Dude Where’s My Ghetto Pass?". In January 2007, VH1 debuted the eight-episode series Ego Trip's The (White) Rapper Show, where Wilson served as co-executive producer. In April 2008, VH1 debuted Ego Trip's Miss Rap Supreme, where Wilson also served as co-executive producer. In 2010 Wilson became Respect's editor-in-chief.

=== Breakup with XXL ===
Wilson's tenure at XXL ended in January 2008 under controversial circumstances. On March 9, 2009, in partnership with Paul Rosenberg, he launched RapRadar.com, a webpage that documents mainstream hip-hop and rap culture in real time. Rap Radar has been nominated for best hip-hop web site for the BET Hip Hop Awards in 2010, 2011, and 2012. In 2010, Wilson became editor of Respect magazine. In 2012, Wilson launched Keep It Thoro, a two-hour weekly show on East Village Radio. The show, hosted by Wilson, features new music, and interviews with today's most popular and relevant artists. Since the summer of 2012, Keep It Thoro has been EVR's No. 1 overall show.

In 2011, The Hollywood Reporter named Wilson to its list of "Top 20 Music Industry Innovators". Billboard named Elliott to its "Twitter 140" in 2011 and 2012, a list of the most influential people in the music business. In 2011, MTV listed Wilson as one of six "Hip-hop Culture MVPs". He has appeared as an expert on ABC, CNN, MTV, MTV2, VH1, BET, among others.

In 2024, he became the editorial director of Uproxx, HipHopDX and Dime Magazine.

== Personal life ==
Wilson lives in Brooklyn, New York, with his wife, Danyel Smith. They were married in Los Angeles in June 2005.

== Cultural work ==
- HRDCVR a hardcover cultural magazine in partnership with wife Danyel Smith.
- Founder of RapRadar.com: Premiere Rap Blog for the latest news, music and video in Hip Hop Culture
- Host of Rap Radar Podcast "Hip hop's premier website connects with our culture's most important voices" in collaboration with Brian "BDot" Miller
- WatchLOUD.com presents CRWN with Elliott Wilson where the world's greatest hip-hop journalist interviews today's hottest rap stars
- Editorial Director, Culture & Content, TIDAL

== See also ==
- List of writers on popular music
- Music journalism
