= Les Daniels =

American writer

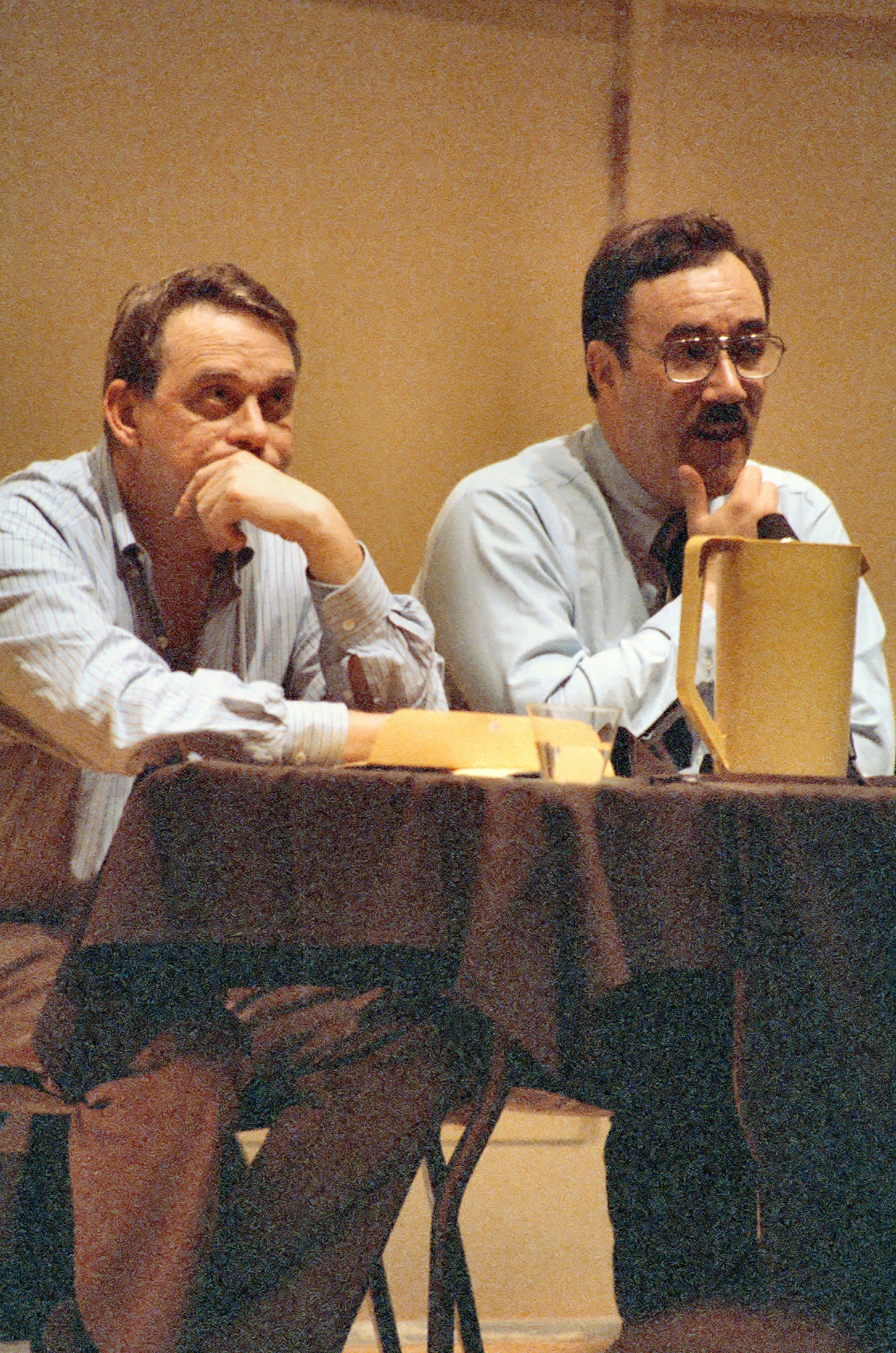
- Daniels (right) with Fred Chappell in 1990
- Born: October 27, 1943
- Died: November 5, 2011 (aged 68)
- Education: Brown University
- Occupations: Writer; musician; journalist
- Writing career
- Genres: Gothic fiction; horror fiction; historical fiction

Leslie Noel Daniels III, better known as Les Daniels (October 27, 1943 – November 5, 2011), was an American writer.

== Background ==
Daniels attended Brown University in Providence, Rhode Island, where he wrote his master's thesis on Frankenstein, and he worked as a musician and as a journalist.

== Career ==
He was the author of five novels featuring the vampire Don Sebastian de Villanueva, a cynical, amoral and misanthropic Spanish nobleman whose predatory appetites pale into insignificance compared with the historical catastrophes which he witnesses in his periodic reincarnations. These include: the Spanish Inquisition in The Black Castle (1978); the Spanish conquest of the Aztecs in The Silver Skull (1979); and the French Revolution's Reign of Terror in Citizen Vampire (1981). In the later novels Yellow Fog (1986, revised 1988) and No Blood Spilled (1991), Sebastian is resurrected in Victorian London and India, where the horror of his vampirism is again contrasted with non-supernatural evil, now in the person of Sebastian's human enemy, Reginald Callender. A sixth (and presumably final) Don Sebastian novel set in Tibet and entitled White Demon was planned and is advertised by some sources as being available for purchase, but in fact was never completed: Daniels had begun writing it before abandoning it due to the demands of his non-fiction projects and was told when able to resume that his publisher had lost interest.

Daniels also worked with the historical fiction genre. The Black Castle features appearances by Torquemada and Columbus; in The Silver Skull Sebastian confronts Hernán Cortés; in Citizen Vampire he has a couple of friendly encounters with the Marquis de Sade; and Madame Tussaud makes an appearance in Yellow Fog.

Daniels described his works as "tragedy, in which evil consumes itself", as opposed to the melodrama of most contemporary horror novels, in which "customarily good guys meet bad guys and win in two out of three falls". He cited Robert Bloch as an influence on his sardonic style, and was an enthusiast of the works of John Dickson Carr, who in several of his own works combined historical fiction with horror and the detective story.

Daniels was also the author of Comix: A History of Comic Books in America (Dutton, 1971) — with illustrations by the Mad Peck — and Living in Fear: A History of Horror in the Mass Media (1975). According to Daniels, at the time he wrote Comix, "there was very little literature on the subject and, in fact, there was very little being produced by fandom. It was an attempt to say, 'Look, here's what has been done in the medium.' I didn't sit down and talk to creators at great length or anything like that." Both Comix and the more extensively researched Five Fabulous Decades of the World's Greatest Comics – Marvel (1991) were written with a general audience in mind, in the hopes of educating both comic book fans and those unfamiliar with the medium.

== Works ==
=== Fiction ===
Don Sebastian de Villanueva

- The Black Castle (1978)
- The Silver Skull (1979)
- Citizen Vampire (1981)
- Yellow Fog (1986; revised and expanded edition 1988)
- No Blood Spilled (1991)
- White Demon (begun circa 1991 but never completed)

An unabridged audio-book recording of The Black Castle was released by Crossroad Press in 2018.

=== Non-fiction ===
- Comix: A History of Comic Books in America 198 pages, 1971, Random House, ISBN 978-0517110379
- Living in Fear: A History of Horror in the Mass Media, 248 pages, 1975, Charles Scribner's Sons, ISBN 978-0684143422
- Marvel: Five Fabulous Decades of the World's Greatest Comics, 287 pages, 1991, Harry N. Abrams, ISBN 978-0810938212
- DC Comics: Sixty Years of the World's Favorite Comic Book Heroes, 256 pages, 1995, Bulfinch, ISBN 978-0821220764
- Superman, the Complete History: The Life and Times of the Man of Steel, 192 pages, 1998, Chronicle Books, ISBN 978-0811821629
- Superman: Masterpiece Edition, 96 pages, 1999, Chronicle Books, ISBN 978-0811821117
- Batman The Complete History: The Life and Times of the Dark Knight, 208 pages, 1999, Chronicle Books, ISBN 978-0811824705
- The Batman Masterpiece Edition: The Caped Crusader's Golden Age, 96 pages, 2000, Chronicle Books, ISBN 978-0811827829
- Wonder Woman: The Complete History, 96 pages, 2000, Chronicle Books, ISBN 978-0811831116
- Wonder Woman: The Golden Age, 80 pages, 2001, Chronicle Books, ISBN 978-0811831239
- The Golden Age of DC Comics: 365 Days, 744 pages, 2004, Harry N. Abrams, ISBN 978-0810949690

=== As editor ===
- Thirteen Tales of Terror (1971; with Diane Thompson)
- Fear (1975)
- Dying of Fright: Masterpieces of the Macabre (1976)

== Awards ==
Year	Award	Category	Work	Result	Ref.
1979	World Fantasy Award	Novel	The Black Castle	Nominated	
1987	World Fantasy Award	Short Fiction	They're Coming for You	Nominated	
1994	World Fantasy Award	Short Fiction	The Little Green Ones	Nominated	
1999	World Fantasy Special Award—Professional		Superman: The Complete History	Nominated	
2001	Lulu Awards		Wonder Woman: The Complete History	Nominated	
2001	Eisner Awards	Comics-Related Book	Wonder Woman: The Complete History	Won	
2002	Eagle Awards	Favourite Comics-based Book	Wonder Woman: The Complete History	Nominated	

== See also ==
- List of horror fiction authors
