= List of popular music journalists =

This is a list of writers on popular music

- Theodor W. Adorno
- Lorraine Ali
- Gino Alache
- Harry Allen
- Hilton Als
- Gina Arnold
- E. Ruth Anderson
- Michael Azerrad
- Lester Bangs
- J. Bennett
- Vladimir Bogdanov
- Jennifer Lopez
- Wayne Baker Brooks
- Bart Bull
- Garry Bushell
- Jeff Chang
- John Chilton
- Ian Christe
- Robert Christgau
- Donald Clarke
- Ta-Nehisi Coates
- Ray Coleman
- J.D. Considine
- Richard Cook
- Karl Coryat
- Charles R. Cross
- Cameron Crowe
- Tony Cummings
- Stanley Dance
- Lynnée Denise
- Anthony DeCurtis
- Charles Delaunay
- Jim DeRogatis
- Jaquira Díaz
- Peter Doggett
- Robert Duncan
- Paul Du Noyer
- Alice Echols
- Chuck Eddy
- Jenny Eliscu
- Michael Erlewine
- Stephen Thomas Erlewine
- Kodwo Eshun
- John Fahey
- Anthony Fantano
- Mick Farren
- Leonard Feather
- Wendy Fonarow
- Ben Fong-Torres
- Mark Fisher
- Sasha Frere-Jones
- David Fricke
- Simon Frith
- Donna Gaines
- Paul Gambaccini
- Peter Gammond
- Nelson George
- Charlie Gillett
- Ira Gitler
- Daniel Glass
- Joe Glazer
- Leslie Gourse
- Gary Graff
- Bill Graham
- Edward Greenfield
- George Grove
- Peter Guralnick
- dream hampton
- John Harris
- Will Hermes
- Stephen Holden
- Amelia Ishmael
- Maura Johnston
- Allan Jones
- Mark Kemp
- Nick Kent
- Chuck Klosterman
- Cub Koda
- Greg Kot
- Jon Landau
- Peter Lang
- Peter Laughner
- Minna Lederman
- Sarah Lewitinn
- Alan Light
- Greil Marcus
- Dave Marsh
- Tris McCall
- Joel McIver
- Legs McNeil
- Molly Meldrum
- Richard Meltzer
- John Mendelsohn
- Sia Michel
- Brett Milano
- Scott Miller
- Jeffrey Morgan
- Paul Morley
- Charles Shaar Murray
- Noel Murray
- Ed Naha
- Paul Nelson
- Lucy O'Brien
- Rob O'Connor
- Robert Palmer
- John Peck (as "The Mad Peck")
- Mark J. Petracca
- Amanda Petrusich
- Ann Powers
- David Quantick
- Nathan Rabin
- Simon Reynolds
- Tim Riley
- Lisa Robinson
- John Rockwell
- Jody Rosen
- Alex Ross
- Kelefa Sanneh
- Jon Savage
- Ryan Schreiber
- Jane Scott
- Joel Selvin
- Rob Sheffield
- Sylvie Simmons
- Patti Smith
- Mat Snow
- Bill Spooner
- Marc Spitz
- Neil Strauss
- Touré
- Greg Tate
- Jon Tiven
- Nick Toczek
- Nick Tosches
- Touré
- Everett True
- Rob Tyner
- Richie Unterberger
- Penny Valentine
- Clinton Walker
- Ed Ward
- Jeff Weiss
- Chris Welch
- Cliff White
- Richard Williams
- Ellen Willis
- Carl Wilson
- Bob Woffinden
- Douglas Wolk
- Frank Worrall
- Veljko Despot
- Hrvoje Horvat
- Aleksandar Dragaš
- Petar Janjatović
- Igor Vidmar
