= IndieCollect =

Independent film preservation organization

IndieCollect is a film preservation organization founded by Sandra Schulberg in 2010. Its goal is to preserve U.S. independent films.

== Background ==
Schulberg worked for five years to restore the 1948 film Nuremberg: Its Lesson for Today and realized the need to preserve independent films. When the studio DuArt Film and Video shut down its film photochemical processing division, it had 60,000 cans of film left behind in its vaults. IndieCollect requested permission from DuArt to access its vaults. IndieCollect engaged in outreach and enlisted institutions including the UCLA Film and Television Archive, Museum of Modern Art, George Eastman House, Anthology Film Archives, Library of Congress, and Academy of Motion Picture Arts and Sciences to rescue film negatives from the vaults. Film titles were identified and either added to archives or returned to filmmakers. While negatives could be returned to filmmakers, they could not be projected, requiring making a print from the negative to do so. For Solomon Northup's Odyssey, IndieCollect used crowdfunding to develop a print of the film created.

== Films restored by IndieCollect ==
- Jazz on a Summer's Day (1959)
- The Atomic Cafe (1982)
- In the Soup (1992)
- Early films by Christine Vachon
- Superstar: The Karen Carpenter Story (1988)
- Home movies of Frank Lloyd Wright
- The War at Home (1979)
- F.T.A. (1972)
- Horace B. Jenkins's Cane River (1982)
- James Ivory's 1957 student film Venice: Themes and Variations
- Gordon Parks's Solomon Northup's Odyssey (1984)

== Status ==
IndieCollect is working to assess 2,000 videotapes from Downtown Community Television Center (DCTV) that were stored in poor conditions. The organization received a $200,000 challenge grant from the Ford Foundation in August 2014 to archive 6,000 films in three years. With the grant, IndieCollect intends to create an index, an encyclopedia, and engage in identification-and-collection outreach.
