= No Blood Spilled =

1991 novel by Les Daniels

- 1996 Raven edition cover
- Author: Les Daniels
- Language: English
- Published: 1991
- Publisher: Tor Books (1991); Raven (1996)
- Publication place: United States
- Pages: 218
- ISBN: 9780812509328
- OCLC: 22996339

No Blood Spilled is a novel by Les Daniels published by TOR in 1991, and by Raven in 1996.

== Plot summary ==
No Blood Spilled is a novel which continues the story of vampire Sebastian Newcastle, in which his enemy Reginald Callender follows him from England to colonial India to destroy him.

== Reception ==
Gideon Kibblewhite reviewed No Blood Spilled for Arcane magazine, rating it a 4 out of 10 overall. Kibblewhite comments that "Enjoyable this may be, but it certainly isn't very creepy, and if Daniels intended it to be light-hearted it doesn't make up for the rather cheesy ending. It spirals into a Holmes-versus-Moriarty affair that makes occasionally [sic] pleasant, but on the whole, unremarkable entertainment."

== Reviews ==
- Review by Algis Budrys (1991) in The Magazine of Fantasy & Science Fiction, July 1991
- Review by Michael A. Morrison (1991) in Necrofile, Summer 1991
- Review by S. T. Joshi (1991) in Studies in Weird Fiction, #9 Spring 1991
