= Cane River (film) =

1982 American film by Horace B. Jenkins

- 2020 re-release poster
- Directed by: Horace B. Jenkins
- Written by: Horace B. Jenkins
- Produced by: Horace B. Jenkins
- Starring: Richard Romain; Tommye Myrick
- Cinematography: Gideon Manasseh
- Edited by: Debi Moore
- Music by: Leroy Glover; Phillip Manuel
- Production companies: HBJ Productions; HBJ Legacy Foundation
- Distributed by: Oscilloscope (2020 re-release)
- Release dates: 1982 (New Orleans); October 22, 2018 (remastered)
- Running time: 104 minutes
- Country: United States
- Language: English

Cane River is a 1982 American romantic drama film that was lost until its rediscovery in 2013 and its subsequent re-release in 2018 and beyond. It was written, produced, and directed by Horace B. Jenkins. The film features the lives of African Americans in the US state of Louisiana. While the film premiered in New Orleans, Louisiana, in 1982, Horace Jenkins died before the film could be released in New York City and beyond. The film was considered lost until a negative was recovered in 2013.

The film was subsequently restored, and a digitally remastered version of the film screened at the 2018 New Orleans Film Festival on October 22, 2018, after having been unseen for 36 years. Distributor Oscilloscope released it in select theaters in the United States in February 2020. During the COVID-19 pandemic, it was available via virtual cinema before premiering on The Criterion Collection's The Criterion Channel in May 2020. In the following August, Cane River was released on home video.

Following its re-release, Cane River received critical acclaim, being highly rated on Rotten Tomatoes and Metacritic.

== Synopsis ==
The New Orleans Film Society described the film, "Cane River is set near Natchitoches, in one of the first 'free communities of color.' Richard Romain plays Peter Metoyer, home to fight for his land, and Tommye Myrick plays the headstrong Maria Mathis, reluctant to succumb to his charms just because he's the scion of a famous family. Together they confront schisms of class and color that threaten to keep them apart and that still roil America today."

== Production ==
Horace B. Jenkins filmed Cane River in New Orleans and Natchitoches Parish in the US state of Louisiana; St Augustine Church in Isle Brevelle was used in some scenes. Plantation scenes were filmed on the Melrose Plantation. The production involved an all-black crew and featured an all-black cast. The film was financed by the prominent Rhodes family in New Orleans.

Sidney Poitier's daughter Pamela was originally cast as the female lead Martha Mathis, but she dropped out of the production and was replaced by Tommye Myrick. Richard Romain played the male lead. For swimming scenes, Romain taught Myrick how to swim.

The film's soundtrack includes music by New Orleans vocalist Phillip Manuel.

== Release ==
=== Premiere in 1982 ===
Cane River premiered in New Orleans, Louisiana in 1982. The New York Times said at the time, it was "already a rarity: a drama by an independent black filmmaker, financed by wealthy black patrons and dealing with race issues untouched by mainstream cinema". Jenkins sought to have a national distribution of the film and its soundtrack, but he died on December 3, 1982, at age 42. Cane River was scheduled to screen in New York City in February 1983, but with his death, the film went unreleased. Richard Pryor, who saw a screening of Cane River before Jenkins's death, had offered to place the film with the studio Warner Bros., with whom he had an agreement to distribute films made by African-Americans, but its producers declined the offer.

=== Rediscovery in 2013 ===
The film was not publicly available until 2013, when the film preservation organization IndieCollect uncovered a negative copy from the vaults of DuArt Film and Video. The Academy Film Archive accepted Cane River sight unseen. IndieCollect's president and the Academy Archive's documentary curator investigated the recovered film and identified the filmmaker and uncovered the background behind the making of the film.

Two years after a negative resurfaced, The New York Times's John Anderson wrote, "It has attained a certain mythic quality, connecting a disparate group of people across the country: New York preservationists dedicated to restoring it; a cultural historian in Louisiana devoting an academic paper to it; an archivist in Los Angeles fascinated with it." The cultural historian, Keilah Spann, watched a bootleg DVD and said the film dealt with colorism in a way no other film had before. Spann found some scenes to be too long, a detail confirmed by the still-living editor Debra I. Moore, who said it was her first film editing along with a "first" for other crew members. Horace Jenkins's son, Sacha Jenkins, who was 11 years old when Cane River was released, is researching the film to create a documentary.

=== Re-release in 2018 and beyond ===
A new 35 mm archival print was created by the Academy Film Archive and was mastered in 4K resolution by IndieCollect with support from the Roger & Chaz Ebert Foundation. The digitally remastered version of the film screened at the 2018 New Orleans Film Festival on October 22, 2018, after having been unseen for 36 years. It screened at the Museum of Modern Art in New York in January 2019. It also screened at Ebertfest in April 2019.

Film distributor Oscilloscope acquired in October 2019 the distribution rights to Cane River. Oscilloscope screened the film at the Brooklyn Academy of Music in New York, NY on February 7, 2020, through February 20, 2020. It also released the film in New Orleans on February 7 and expanded to select theaters throughout the United States in ensuing weeks. The Academy of Motion Picture Arts and Sciences screened Cane River in Los Angeles on November 1, 2020, with a panel discussion featuring lead actors Tommye Myrick and Richard Romain.

In its commercial release in two theaters on the weekend of February 7–9, Cane River grossed an estimated $10,240, which Deadline Hollywood said was "an OK debut for an indie re-release opening in two theaters". Following the COVID-19 pandemic that impacted US movie theaters in March 2020, Cane River was made available via virtual cinema, a film distribution strategy using video-on-demand streaming services to benefit art-house theaters, around the United States, including the BAM.

Cane River premiered on The Criterion Collection's The Criterion Channel on May 4, 2020. A month later, in support of the Black Lives Matter movement with the ongoing George Floyd protests, the service lifted its paywall for black-themed films, including Cane River, to be streamed for free.

In August 2020, Cane River was released on DVD and Blu-ray disc.

== Critical reception ==
Following the film's re-release in the 21st century, review aggregator Rotten Tomatoes assessed a sample of 16 reviews as positive or negative and said 100% of the critics gave positive reviews with an average rating of 7.7 out of 10. The similar website Metacritic said the film had "generally favorable" reviews, assessing seven reviews as positive, mixed, or negative and classifying all seven as positive with an overall weighted score of 80 out of 100. In June 2020, The Hollywood Reporter's film critics listed Cane River among "the 10 best movies of 2020 so far".

A. O. Scott wrote in The New York Times that the film is "relaxed, reflective and sweet", and that it places Peter and Maria's courtship within "a lyrical contemplation of landscape" and a "historical argument". Scott described Gary B. Mills's local history The Forgotten People as more than a prop in the film, and wrote that it is treated as a reference point for the characters' discussions of who they are. Scott also wrote that Jenkins avoids flattening characters into representatives of a single viewpoint and that the film's "dominant feeling" is "affection", expressed both among the characters and through the director's treatment of the landscape. Richard Brody, writing in The New Yorker, described the drama as centered on independence and on confronting and overcoming "the burdens of personal and collective history".

In Slant Magazine, Chuck Bowen wrote that the film is structured as a series of conversations about how history, specifically "racist atrocities", continues to shape the present, and he described Jenkins as contrasting "searing dialogue" with lyrical images of the Louisiana countryside. Bowen also wrote that the film alternates between "speechifying and flirting", describing this as an "awkward" structure. He argued that the awkwardness is itself expressive of "the pain and confusion of wrestling with truths that shake one's conception of identity". In a review for RogerEbert.com, Nick Allen described the film as moving at an unhurried pace and returning repeatedly to scenery and romance, while also presenting conflict tied to Peter's family history and to Black land ownership. Allen quoted dialogue including Peter's line, "The closest I'll get to the pros is the prose I put down with pencil on paper," and a lawyer's statement, "We are now losing land in this country at the rate of a thousand acres a week."

Reviewers also commented on performances, music, and craft. Allen wrote that some domestic scenes are shot in wide compositions "as if we're watching a theatrical production", and he suggested that such "bumpier parts" reflect limited resources. Bowen referred to song-backed montages as "cheesy", and called the sequence following Maria's brother "among [the film's] most powerful sequences". Writing for The Times-Picayune, Mike Scott noted framing and lighting problems, awkward dialogue, some amateurish supporting performances, and dated music, while also describing the film for Louisiana audiences as a "visual time capsule" of early-1980s locations in Natchitoches and New Orleans. Roger Moore (Movie Nation) criticized the dialogue as banal, described much of the acting as flat and some supporting work as amateurish, and called the rhythm-and-blues soundtrack "quaint", while also writing that the film's themes and "big ideas" give it "promise, ambition and social currency", and noting its time-capsule images of New Orleans.
