= Raquel Cepeda =

American journalist, critic, film-maker and autobiographer

- Born: June 9, 1973 (age 53); Harlem, New York, United States
- Occupations: Author; journalist; film-maker
- Spouse: Sacha Jenkins (died 2025)
- Children: 2
- Writing career
- Genres: Hip-hop; world music; social justice; popular culture; race and identity
- Website: djalirancher.com

Raquel Cepeda (born June 9, 1973) is an American journalist, critic, film-maker, and autobiographer of Dominican descent. The editor of Russell Simmons' OneWorld magazine between 2001 and 2004, Cepeda was also the editor of the award-winning anthology "And It Don't Stop: The Best American Hip-Hop Journalism of the Last 25 Years", the co-producer, writer, and director of the documentary film Bling: A Planet Rock, and the author of "Bird of Paradise: How I Became Latina."

== Early life and education ==
Cepeda describes her early life in detail in "Bird of Paradise: How I Became Latina." She was born in Harlem to Dominican immigrants on June 9, 1973. As a young child, Cepeda herself lived in the Dominican Republic before returning to New York in 1981. There, in the Inwood/Washington Heights section of Upper Manhattan, she resided with her father, who was abusive, and her Scandinavian stepmother. Cepeda's relationship with her mother was essentially nonexistent after 1981.

As a student, Cepeda frequently found herself at odds with the authority figures at the schools she attended. This contentiousness stemmed from Cepeda's belief that the system mis-educated students about American history and their own respective ethnic histories as well. Like many other young and disenfranchised people, Cepeda found community in 1980s hip-hop culture. It was hip-hop, she says, that fueled her passion for exploring the issues of race, identity, and social justice through journalism, writing, and filmmaking.

== Career ==
During the past 20 years, Cepeda has written about music, culture, fitness, politics, race and identity for such publications as People, Time Out New York, The Village Voice, CNN.com, The New York Times, and many other outlets.

In 2001, Cepeda was named editor-in-chief of Russell Simmons' OneWorld magazine. She was then 28 years old. The San Francisco Chronicle praised Cepeda's stewardship as follows: "Finally, there's another option for the intelligent urban mind, and much like the woman at its helm, OneWorld magazine is bold and refreshing."

Cepeda left OneWorld in 2004, a few months before the publication of "And It Don't Stop: The Best American Hip-Hop Journalism." In a review for Salon.com, Peter L'Official wrote, "At its best, 'And It Don't Stop' is a collection of hip-hop's most vital moments — a historical documentation of the music's evolution and the journalism that evolved along with that music." The anthology went on to win a PEN/Open Book Award and a Latino Book Award.

In 2007, Cepeda co-produced, wrote and directed the feature documentary Bling: A Planet Rock. Featuring the American rappers Raekwon and Paul Wall and the Puerto Rican rapper and reggaeton star Tego Calderon, the film was described by Catherine Clyne in Satya magazine as "a unique documentary that draws together American hip-hop, its trappings of glittery bling-worship and the recent civil war in Sierra Leone, which was fueled by diamonds mined under brutal conditions." A shorter version of the film, edited for content and time, aired on VH1 in February 2007 under the title Bling'd: Blood, Diamonds and Hip-Hop.

Cepeda's autobiography, "Bird of Paradise: How I Became Latina," was published by Atria Books in March 2013. In a review for NBC Latino, Claudio Remeseira suggested that readers should see the book as "the non-fiction, female-gender companion to Junot Díaz's 'The Brief Wondrous Life of Oscar Wao'. Both are tales of self-discovery through the many racial, ethnic, and linguistic conflicting forces that lie at the heart of U.S. Latino identity, as well as the story of a personal struggle against a supposed fukú or ancestral curse that has haunted the author's families for generations." The Huffington Post's Dr. David J. Leonard wrote that "'Bird of Paradise' is a book where hip-hop meets the human genome project."

Since March 2015, Cepeda has been the co-host of a podcast called "Our National Conversation About Conversations About Race." Known more briefly as "About Race," the show has been described as "a lively multiracial, interracial conversation about the ways we can't talk, don't talk, would rather not talk, but intermittently, fitfully, embarrassingly do talk about culture, identity, politics, power, and privilege in our pre-post-yet-still-very-racial America." Co-founded by Cepeda with authors Baratunde Thurston and Tanner Colby, "About Race" was produced by Panoply Media, a part of Slate's podcast network.

== Personal life ==
Raquel Cepeda was married to Sacha Jenkins, who was an American television producer, writer, musician and curator. She lives in New York City with her daughter, Djali, and their son, Marceau. Jenkins died in 2025.
