= Dusty Wright =

American musician

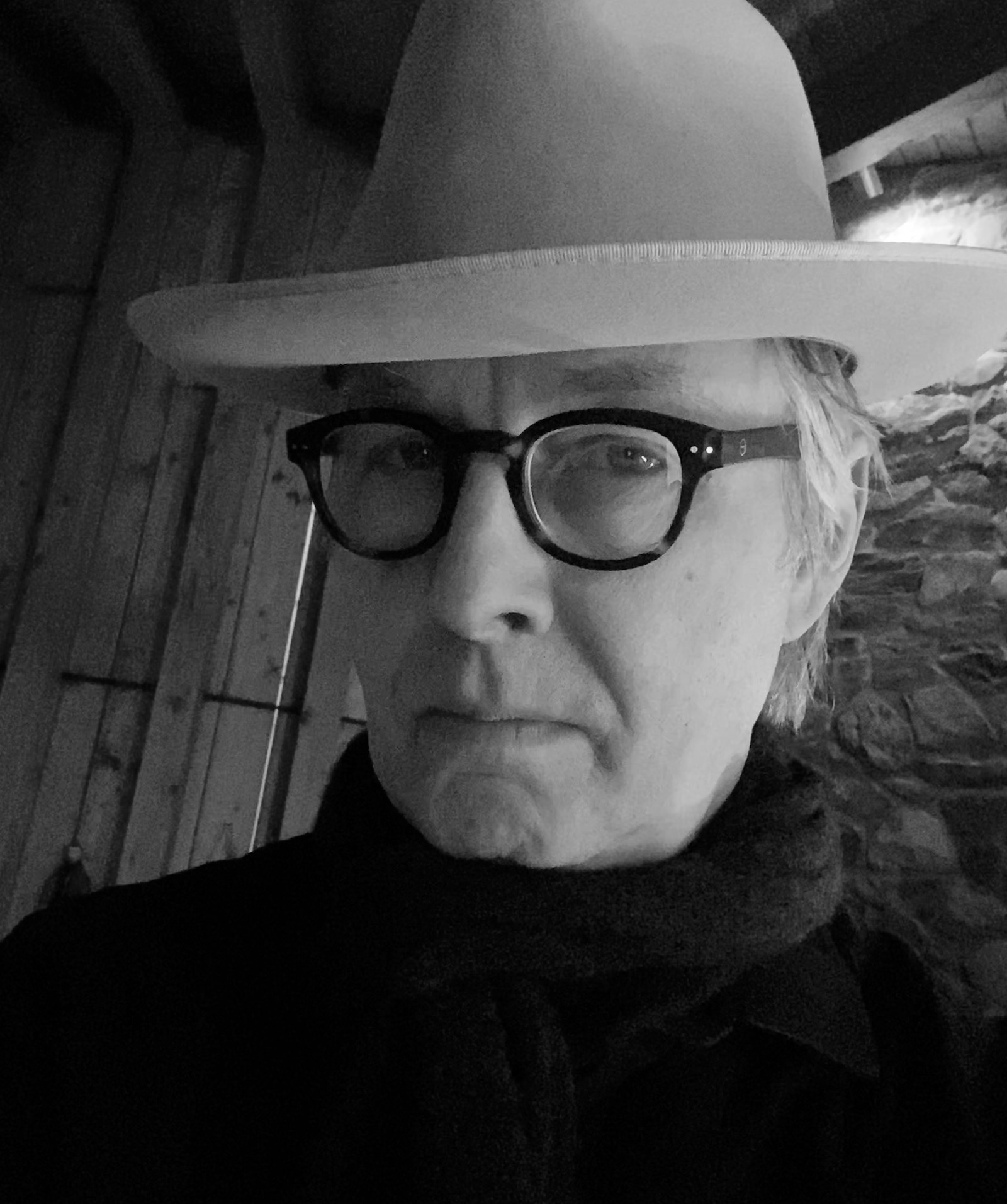
- Wright at his home in upstate New York
- Born: Mark J. Petracca; July 2, 1957 (age 68)
- Occupations: Musician; producer; writer; editor

Dusty Wright (born Mark J. Petracca) is an American musician, producer, and writer, and a former editor-in-chief of the music magazine Creem. In August 2005, he co-founded the audio podcasting and video webcasting online pop-culture magazine CultureCatch.com, which features his interview series The Dusty Wright Show. Interviews from the show were among the first video and audio podcasts featured at iTunes with such guests as Ron Howard, Gore Vidal, Jim Marshall, Budd Hopkins, and CultureCatch.com board advisor David Lynch.

== Early life ==
Dusty Wright was born Mark J. Petracca. He grew up in Akron, Ohio. He attended St. Vincent-St. Mary High School and received his BA from the University of Akron.

== Career ==
Wright is a former editor-in-chief of Creem and Prince's New Power Generation. The Dusty Wright screenplay The Gentleman Bandit was screened at the AFM and Malibu Film Festivals in 2000 and Wright served as music consultant for the 2004 Johnny Depp movie Secret Window.

Wright was producer on the 2005 documentary Wildwood Days and on the 2008 documentary Airplay: The Rise and Fall of Rock Radio. Wright was co-head writer on Cee Lo Green's show Talking To Strangers on Fuse.tv.

As a singer/songwriter Wright contributed the song "Speed of Life" for contemporary American artist Ron English on his compilation English 101, and recorded "Ramble On" for the Led Zeppelin tribute "The Song Retains The Name, Volume 2 (Safehouse Records) as well as a track for "Baseball (America's Game)" on Nolan Ryan: A Musical Tribute. Wright's song "I'm Still In Love (w/You)" is featured in David Koepp’s 2008 film Ghost Town and the video for "Secret Window" from If We Never... was awarded "Best Music Video" at the 2011 Los Angeles Film & Script Festival. Wright's song "Swirl" was featured on BBC Radio 6 Music by music critic Rob Hughes and former member of rock group The Fall, and British DJ Marc Riley. If We Never... received three stars from Hughes in his Americana Roundup column in the September 2011 issue of Uncut magazine.

Wright hosts the twice-weekly online radio show Dusty Wright's Dusty Roads on the website of Transcendental Music, a charity music label founded by filmmaker David Lynch.

He is a contributor to The Huffington Post.

As of 2014 Wright was working on a documentary film about Jesse A. Marcel Jr., the son of Roswell Incident witness Jesse A. Marcel, entitled Growing Up With Roswell. The film, which is written by Leonard J. Marcel, the cousin of Marcel Jr., focuses on how the Roswell Incident has affected the entire Marcel family. Filming began in late July/early August 2014, and its locations include Helena, Montana, where Marcel Jr. lived, as well as New Orleans, Seattle, Toronto and Roswell. Production is estimated to last 18 months, in the hopes of having the film completed in time for the UFO Festival in Roswell in July 2015.

== Personal life ==
In 1995, friends introduced Wright to culinary businesswoman Bobbie Lloyd, who would later become Chief Baking Officer for Magnolia Bakery in 2006, and a judge on the TLC reality television series The Next Great Baker. Wright proposed to her in September 1996. On May 4, 1997 they married in a Unitarian Universalist wedding ceremony at the Kim Foster Gallery in SoHo. They live in New York City, on Manhattan's Upper West Side. They have two children.

Wright studies tai chi.

== Discography ==
- Dusty Wright (1997)
- dust! (2000)
- GIANTfingers (2002)
- Elevened (2004)
- Ghost Town EP (2008)
- If We Never... (2011)
- Caterwauling Towards The Light (2017)
- Gliding Towards Oblivion (2018)
- Can Anyone Hear Me? (2020)
- Lonelyville (2022)
- Songs, Vol. 1 (2023)
- Dusted Off (2024)
