= The Mad Peck =

American cartoonist (1942–2025)

- Born: John Frederick Peck; November 16, 1942 New York City, U.S.
- Died: March 15, 2025 (aged 82) Providence, Rhode Island, U.S.
- Pseudonyms: Dr. Oldie; The Masked Marvel
- Notable works: Burn of the Week
- Spouse: Vicky (née Oliver) Peck

John Frederick Peck (November 16, 1942 – March 15, 2025), known as The Mad Peck, was an American underground cartoonist, rock poster artist and disc jockey. His most famous poster is a 1978 comic book-style poster that starts with the line, "Providence, Rhode Island, where it rains two days out of three except during the rainy season when it snows like a bitch." The poster has been reprinted many times and is widely available for purchase throughout Rhode Island.

== Background ==
Born in Brooklyn, New York, on November 16, 1942, John Frederick Peck grew up in Connecticut and attended Brown University, where he studied engineering. Graduating from Brown in 1967, in the intervening years he also attended New York University and the Rhode Island School of Design.

== Career ==
Peck created silkscreen concert posters for Rhode Island concerts from 1966 to 1971, for acts including Jimi Hendrix, Janis Joplin, The Band, and Cream. His "Final Appearance" Cream poster has been widely bootlegged.

His comix work first appeared in 1969 in underground newspapers like the East Village Other and the Chicago Seed. Consisting mostly of manipulated clip art from old advertisements, his strips advertised items like "GIANT INHALER" and "FREE CIGARETTE PAPERS". Hippies and yippies would send five cents for one of his minicomic catalogs. This led to the weekly comic Burn of the Week, which was distributed by the Underground Press Syndicate and offered phoney endorsements of Wayne Newton albums next to bong-building tips.

In the late 1960s/early 1970s Peck fell in with other Providence countercultural types, including writer Les Daniels and comedian Martin Mull. 1971, Peck illustrated Daniel's Comix: A History of Comic Books in America, one of the first academic histories of the medium.

By the mid 1970s, The Mad Peck was creating a regular comic which ran monthly in Creem, and also plugged products in a bizarre pop culture mish-mash similar to some of Bill Griffith's Zippy the Pinhead work.

Averse to publicity or being photographed, the Peck co-hosted an oldies show in the 1970s on Brown's WBRU-FM radio station under the name "Dr. Oldie." The show was titled, "The Giant Jukebox" and often featured discs from his massive collection of over 30,000 vinyl records.

== Personal life and death ==
Peck was married to Vicky (née Oliver) Peck. The marriage ended in the late 1970s.

He lived in Providence, Rhode Island and died at a hospital there on March 15, 2025, at the age of 82, from complications of a ruptured aortic aneurysm.

== Books ==
- Mad Peck Studios: A 20 Year Retrospective (Doubleday, 1987).
