= Charlie Boy =

American-bred Thoroughbred racehorse (1955–1968)

Charley Boy
- Sire: Graphic
- Grandsire: Alibhai (horse)
- Dam: Pair Play
- Damsire: Blue Pair
- Sex: Gelding
- Foaled: March 4, 1955
- Country: United States
- Colour: Brown
- Breeder: Penn Bros
- Owner: William W. Carroll
- Trainer: William W. Carroll
- Record: 241: 58-45-35
- Earnings: $207,642
- Last updated on August 29, 2012

Charley Boy (March 4, 1955 – 1968) was a Thoroughbred race horse who achieved great popularity in New England during the 1960s.

== Background ==
Charlie Boy was a brown gelding bred in Kentucky by Penn Bros. During his racing career he was (primarily) owned and trained by William W. Carroll.

== Racing career ==
While racing in the winter of 1959–60, Charlie Boy won the Black Gold Handicap, Christmas Handicap and Pelleteri Handicap at the Fair Grounds in New Orleans to be deemed the best sprinter on the grounds. His four year old season saw him win 13 times in 29 starts for earnings of $46,600.

His biggest win in New England was the 1961 John Alden Handicap at Suffolk Downs which he won by a length in 1:10 1/5 with jockey Phil Grimm up.

Charlie Boy won 58 times on the race track, one of the highest totals in racing history, many of them coming at Narragansett Park. On July 24, 1958, Charlie Boy won at "Gansett" and paid $34.80 on a $2 win ticket.

== Death and honors ==
On February 6, 1968, after suffering a catastrophic injury in training, the fan favorite was put down. The next day, Charlie Boy was buried in the Narragansett Park infield. There was a ceremony which included the playing of "Taps".
