= Respect (magazine) =

American hip hop and photojournalism magazine

- Categories: Hip hop
- Frequency: Annually (print)
- First issue: 2009
- Country: United States
- Language: English
- Website: www.respect-mag.com
- ISSN: 2150-8674

Respect (stylized as Respect.) is a New York–based hip hop and photojournalism magazine founded in 2009 by Jonathan Rheingold. The publication covers hip hop culture, focusing on music, photography, and style. Its circulation is approximately 250,000 per issue.

Rheingold was previously the executive publisher of Harris Publications. After leaving Harris in 2009, he launched Respect with the help of Kris Ex, Paul Scirecalabrisotto, and Sally Berman.

Each issue of Respect features interviews with popular hip hop artists. Past covers – including digital covers – have featured rappers Drake, A$AP Ferg, Waka Flocka, Big K.R.I.T., Tyler, the Creator, Nipsey Hussle, and Eminem. The magazine also focuses on photographers with a special interest in hip hop, such as Jonathan Mannion, Albert Watson, and Mike Miller.

In 2010, Rap Radar founder Elliott Wilson became editor-in-chief of the magazine. He previously worked with Rheingold at XXL. Datwon Thomas, editor-in-chief of VIBE Magazine, was also a past EIC of Respect.

Notable journalist and editorial director, Tony Gervino, also had a stint with RESPECT. as Editorial Director of issue #4 featuring T.I. on the cover
