= Robert Duncan (writer) =

American music critic

- Born: November 5, 1952 (age 73); Sheboygan, Wisconsin, U.S.
- Occupations: Music critic, author, journalist, entrepreneur
- Writing career
- Period: 1970s – present
- Subjects: Rock music, jazz

Robert Duncan (born November 5, 1952) is an American music critic, author and entrepreneur.

== Career ==
Robert Duncan was managing editor of Creem from 1975 to 1976 and a contributor to the magazine from 1974 to 1981.

His characterization of heavy metal as "dismal, abysmal, terrible, horrible, and stupid music, barely music at all" has been cited multiple times by academics as evidence of the contempt most critics held for the genre.

Duncan also writes poetry and novels. His poems have been published in Maintenant, The Journal of Contemporary Dada Writing and Art. His first novel, Loudmouth, based in part on his experiences in music, was published on October 6, 2020, by Three Rooms Press (distributed by PGW/Ingram).

== Personal life ==
Duncan is married to the artist and photographer Roni Hoffman. They have two adult children.
